= Nagarjuna filmography =

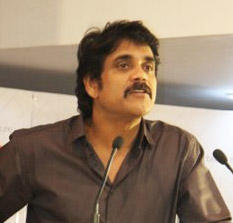
Nagarjuna in 2010

Nagarjuna (Born 29 August 1959) is an Indian actor and producer who works in the Telugu cinema. He has acted in over 90 films as a lead actor as well as playing supporting and cameo roles, including Hindi and Tamil cinema. He has received nine state Nandi Awards, three Filmfare Awards South, and one Special Mention at the National Film Awards. The 1996 film Ninne Pelladata which he produced, was declared the Best Telugu film of the year at the National Film Awards.

Nagarjuna enacted the role of 15th century composer Annamacharya in the 1997 film Annamayya; as Yavakri (the son of the ascetic Bharadwaja) in the 2002 film Agni Varsha; as Major Padmapani Acharya in the 2003 war film, LOC Kargil; as 17th-century composer Kancherla Gopanna in the 2006 film Sri Ramadasu; as Sai Baba of Shirdi in the 2012 film Shirdi Sai; and as Chandaludu (Lord Siva in disguise) in the 2013 film Jagadguru Adi Sankara.

In 1989, Nagarjuna acted in the Mani Ratnam directed romantic drama film, Geetanjali, which won the National Film Award for Best Popular Film Providing Wholesome Entertainment. In the same year, he acted in Siva, an action blockbuster directed by Ram Gopal Varma, premiered at the 13th International Film Festival of India. In 1990, he subsequently made his Bollywood debut with the Hindi remake of the same film titled Shiva, and tasted success. In 1997, he received the National Film Award for producing Ninne Pelladata. In 1998, he received the National Film Award-Special Mention for his performance in the historical film Annamayya.

In 2013, Nagarjuna represented Cinema of South India at the Delhi Film Festival's 100 Years of Indian Cinema's celebration, alongside Ramesh Sippy and Vishal Bharadwaj from Bollywood. In 1995, he ventured into film production, with a production unit operating in Seychelles, and was a co-director of an Emmy Award-winning film animation company in Michigan, U.S. Along with his brother, Venkat Akkineni, Nagarjuna is the co-owner of the production company, Annapurna Studios and is the president of the non-profit film school Annapurna International School of Film and Media based in Hyderabad.

== Film ==
=== As actor ===
Key
†	Denotes films that have not yet been released

Year	Title	Role	Language	Notes	Ref.
1961	Velugu Needalu		Telugu	Bilingual film; Baby artist	
1961	Thooya Ullam		Tamil	Bilingual film; Baby artist	
1968	Sudigundalu		Telugu	Child artist	
1986	Vikram	Vikram	Telugu		
1986	Captain Nagarjun	Nagarjuna	Telugu		
1986	Aranyakanda	Chaitanya	Telugu		
1987	Majnu	Rajesh	Telugu		
1987	Sankeertana	Kaasi	Telugu		
1987	Trimurtulu	Himself	Telugu	Cameo Appearance	
1987	Collector Gari Abbai	Ravi	Telugu		
1987	Agni Putrudu	Kalidaasu	Telugu		
1987	Kirai Dada	Vijay	Telugu		
1988	Aakhari Poratam	Vihari	Telugu		
1988	Chinababu	Venu Gopal	Telugu		
1988	Murali Krishnudu	Murali Krishna	Telugu		
1988	Rao Gari Illu	Himself	Telugu	Cameo appearance	
1988	Janaki Ramudu	Ranga (Ramu) (Note: Akkineni Nagarjuna played a single character with two or more names.)	Telugu		
1989	Vijay	Vijay	Telugu		
1989	Vicky Daada	Vikram	Telugu		
1989	Geetanjali	Prakash	Telugu		
1989	Agni	Pavan Kumar	Telugu		
1989	Siva	Siva	Telugu		
1990	Prema Yuddham	Kalyan	Telugu		
1990	Neti Siddhartha	Siddhartha	Telugu		
1990	Iddaru Iddare	Ravi	Telugu		
1990	Shiva	Shiva	Hindi		
1991	Nirnayam	Vamsi Krishna	Telugu		
1991	Chaitanya	Chaitanya	Telugu		
1991	Shanti Kranti	Inspector Subash	Telugu	Multilingual film; Telugu version only	
1991	Jaitra Yatra	Teja	Telugu		
1992	Killer	Eeswar Prasad (Prem Krishna)	Telugu		
1992	Khuda Gawah	Inspector Raja Mirza	Hindi		
1992	Antham	Raghav (Shekar)	Telugu	Bilingual film	
1992	Drohi	Raghav (Shekar)	Hindi	Bilingual film	
1992	President Gari Pellam	Raja	Telugu		
1993	Rakshana	Bose	Telugu		
1993	Varasudu	Vinay	Telugu		
1993	Allari Alludu	Kalyan (Rajesh)	Telugu		
1994	Govinda Govinda	Seenu	Telugu		
1994	Hello Brother	Deva, Ravi Varma (Note: Akkineni Nagarjuna played two characters.)	Telugu		
1994	Criminal	Dr. Ajay Kumar	Telugu		
1995	Ghatothkachudu	Chitha	Telugu	Cameo appearance	
1995	Gharana Bullodu	Raju	Telugu		
1995	Sisindri	Raja	Telugu		
1995	Criminal	Dr. Ajay Kumar	Hindi		
1995	Vajram	Chakri	Telugu		
1996	Ramudochadu	Ram	Telugu		
1996	Mr. Bechara	Ajay	Hindi	Special appearance	
1996	Ninne Pelladata	Seenu	Telugu	Also producer; National Film Award for Best Feature Film in Telugu; Filmfare Award for Best Film – Telugu	
1997	Annamayya	Annamacharya	Telugu	National Film Award-Special Mention; Nandi Award for Best Actor; Filmfare Award for Best Actor – Telugu	
1997	Ratchagan	Ajay Padmanabhan	Tamil		
1998	Aavida Maa Aavide	Vikranth	Telugu		
1998	Auto Driver	Jagan	Telugu		
1998	Angaarey	Raja Lokhande	Hindi		
1998	Chandralekha	Raj Kapoor (Seeta Rama Rao)	Telugu		
1998	Zakhm	Raman Desai	Hindi		
1999	Seetharama Raju	Ramaraju	Telugu		
1999	Ravoyi Chandamama	Sashi	Telugu		
2000	Nuvvu Vasthavani	Chinni Krishna	Telugu		
2000	Ninne Premistha	Srinivas	Telugu		
2000	Azad	Chandra Shekar Azad	Telugu	Nandi Award for Best Feature Film - Silver	
2001	Eduruleni Manishi	Surya Murthy, Satya	Telugu		
2001	Bava Nachadu	Ajay	Telugu		
2001	Adhipathi	Jagan	Telugu		
2001	Akasa Veedhilo	Chandra Sekhar (Chandu)	Telugu		
2001	Snehamante Idera	Aravind	Telugu		
2002	Santosham	Karthikeya	Telugu	Nandi Award for Best Actor	
2002	Agni Varsha	Yavakri	Hindi		
2002	Manmadhudu	Abhiram	Telugu		
2003	Sivamani	CI Sivamani	Telugu		
2003	LOC Kargil	Major Padmapani Acharya	Hindi		
2004	Nenunnanu	Venu Madhav	Telugu		
2004	Mass	Ganesh (Mass)	Telugu		
2005	Super	Akhil	Telugu		
2006	Style	Mass	Telugu	Cameo appearance	
2006	Sri Ramadasu	Kancherla Gopanna	Telugu	Nandi Award for Best Actor	
2006	Boss	Gopal Krishna	Telugu		
2007	Don	Suri	Telugu		
2008	King	Raja Chandra Pratap Varma aka King (Bottu Seenu, Sarath)	Telugu		
2008	Krishnarjuna	Lord Krishna / Bangaram	Telugu		
2010	Kedi	Ramesh "Rummy"	Telugu		
2010	Thakita Thakita	Nag	Telugu	Cameo appearance	
2010	Ragada	Satya Reddy	Telugu		
2011	Gaganam	Major N. Raveendra	Telugu	Bilingual film	
2011	Payanam	Major N. Raveendra	Tamil	Bilingual film	
2011	Rajanna	Rajanna	Telugu		
2012	Shirdi Sai	Shirdi Sai Baba	Telugu	Also playback singer for the song "Okkade Devudu"	
2012	Damarukam	Mallikarjuna	Telugu		
2013	Greeku Veerudu	Chandu	Telugu		
2013	Jagadguru Adi Shankara	Chandaludu	Telugu		
2013	Bhai	Vijay	Telugu		
2014	Manam	Seetharamudu, Nageswara Rao "Bittu"	Telugu		
2015	Dongaata	Himself	Telugu	Special appearance in the song "Break up Antu"	
2015	Akhil	Himself	Telugu	Special appearance in the song "Akkineni Akkineni"	
2016	Soggade Chinni Nayana	Bangarraju, Dr. Ram Mohan	Telugu	Also playback singer for the song "Dikka Dikka Dum Dum"	
2016	Oopiri	Vikramaditya "Vikram"	Telugu	Bilingual film IIFA Utsavam for Best Performance in a Supporting Role – Male	
2016	Thozha	Vikramaditya "Vikram"	Tamil	Bilingual film IIFA Utsavam for Best Performance in a Supporting Role – Male	
2016	Nirmala Convent	Himself	Telugu	Extended cameo appearance; Also producer and singer for the song "Kotha Kotha Bhasha"	
2016	Premam	Vikram's father	Telugu	Cameo appearance	
2017	Om Namo Venkatesaya	Hathiram Bhavaji	Telugu		
2017	Raju Gari Gadhi 2	Rudra	Telugu		
2018	Officer	Sivaji Rao IPS	Telugu		
2018	Devadas	Deva	Telugu		
2019	Manmadhudu 2	Sambasiva Rao / Sam	Telugu		
2021	Wild Dog	Vijay Varma	Telugu		
2022	Bangarraju	Bangarraju, Dr. Ram Mohan	Telugu	Also playback singer for the song "Laddunda"	
2022	Brahmāstra: Part One – Shiva	Anish Shetty	Hindi		
2022	The Ghost	Vikram Naidu	Telugu		
2024	Naa Saami Ranga	Kishtayya	Telugu		
2025	Kuberaa	Deepak Tej	Telugu; Tamil	Bilingual Film	
2025	Coolie	Simon Xavier	Tamil		
2026	King 100		Telugu		

=== As producer ===
Year	Title
1979	Kalyani
1980	Pilla Zamindar
1980	Buchi Babu
1981	Premabhishekam
1981	Prema Kanuka
1982	Yuvaraju
1983	Sri Ranga Neethulu
1995	Sisindri
1996	Ninne Pelladata
1998	Aahaa..!
1998	Sri Sita Ramula Kalyanam Chootamu Raarandi
1998	Chandralekha
1999	Prema Katha
1999	Seetharama Raju
2000	Yuvakudu
2002	Manmadhudu
2003	Satyam
2004	Mass
2005	Super
2011	Rajanna
2013	Bhai
2013	Uyyala Jampala
2014	Manam
2014	Oka Laila Kosam
2016	Soggade Chinni Nayana
2016	Nirmala Convent
2017	Rarandoi Veduka Chudham
2017	Hello
2018	Rangula Ratnam
2019	Manmadhudu 2
2022	Bangarraju
2026	Lenin
2026	King 100

== Television ==
Year	Title	Role	Network	Language	Notes
2014–2016	Meelo Evaru Koteeswarudu	Host	MAA TV	Telugu	
2019–present	Bigg Boss	Host	Star Maa	Telugu	
2020	Loser	Producer	ZEE5	Telugu	
2022	Bigg Boss Non-Stop	Host	Disney+ Hotstar	Telugu	
2024	Nayanthara: Beyond the Fairytale	Himself	Netflix	English	Documentary film

== Music videos ==
Year	Title	Performer(s)	Language	Ref.
1997	"Apna Desh to Apna Ho" (Meri Jann Hindustan)	Hariharan	Hindi	
2013	"Betiyaan" (Save the Girl Child)	Shankar Mahadevan, Sunidhi Chauhan, Sonu Nigam	Hindi	

== See also ==
- List of Indian film actors
- Telugu cinema
