= List of awards and nominations received by Nagarjuna =

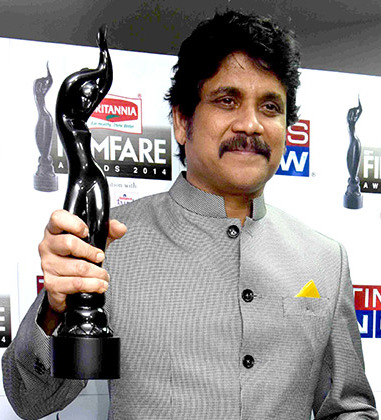
Nagarjuna holding the Best film trophy at 62nd Filmfare Awards South for Manam

Nagarjuna is an Indian actor, producer and television presenter who works primarily in Telugu cinema and television. He has received ten state Nandi Awards, three Filmfare Awards South and a National Film Award-Special Mention. He received his first National Film Awards during 1996 as he produced, Ninne Pelladata, which has garnered the National Film Award for Best Feature Film in Telugu for that year. His performance in Annamayya received a National Film Award – Special Mention (Actor) in the 45th National Film Awards in 1998.

== CineMAA Awards ==
The CineMAA Awards are presented annually by Movie Artists Association Group, a television network based in Hyderabad.

Year	Film	Category	Result	Ref.
2006	Mass	Best Actor - Male	Won	
2012	Rajanna	Special Jury Award – Best Actor	Won	
2013	Shirdi Sai	Special Jury Award – Best Actor	Won	
2015	Manam	Special Jury Award – Best Film	Won	
2015	Manam	Exceptional Performance Award	Won	

== Filmfare Awards South ==
The Filmfare Awards South is the South Indian segment of the annual Filmfare Awards, presented by The Times Group to honour both artistic and technical excellence of professionals in the South Indian film industry. The awards are separately given for Kannada, Tamil, Telugu and Malayalam films.

Year	Film	Category	Result	Ref.
1987	Majnu	Best Actor – Telugu	Nominated	
1988	Aakhari Poratam	Best Actor – Telugu	Nominated	
1988	Murali Krishnudu	Best Actor – Telugu	Nominated	
1989	Geetanjali	Best Actor – Telugu	Nominated	
1989	Siva	Best Actor – Telugu	Nominated	
1992	Antham	Best Actor – Telugu	Nominated	
1994	Hello Brother	Best Actor – Telugu	Nominated	
1995	Gharana Bullodu	Best Actor – Telugu	Nominated	
1996	Ninne Pelladatha	Best Actor – Telugu	Nominated	
1996	Ninne Pelladatha	Best Film – Telugu (as producer)	Won	
1997	Annamayya	Best Actor – Telugu	Won	
1998	Chandralekha	Best Actor – Telugu	Nominated	
1998	Chandralekha	Best Film – Telugu (as producer)	Nominated	
1999	Prema Katha	Best Film – Telugu (as producer)	Nominated	
2000	Azad	Best Actor – Telugu	Nominated	
2002	Manmadhudu	Best Film – Telugu (as producer)	Nominated	
2002	Santosham	Best Actor – Telugu	Nominated	
2004	Mass	Best Actor – Telugu	Nominated	
2005	Super	Best Film – Telugu (as producer)	Nominated	
2005	Super	Best Actor – Telugu	Nominated	
2006	Sri Ramadasu	Best Actor – Telugu	Nominated	
2011	Rajanna	Best Film – Telugu (as producer)	Nominated	
2011	Rajanna	Best Actor – Telugu	Nominated	
2012	Damarukam	Best Actor – Telugu	Nominated	
2013	Uyyala Jampala	Best Film – Telugu (as producer)	Nominated	
2014	Manam	Best Film – Telugu (as producer)	Won	
2014	Manam	Best Actor - Telugu	Nominated	
2016	Oopiri	Best Actor - Telugu	Nominated	

== Nandi Awards ==
The Nandi Awards are the awards that recognize the excellence in Telugu cinema, Telugu theatre and Telugu television, and Lifetime achievements in Indian cinema. Presented annually by the Government of Andhra Pradesh.

Year (Note: Refers to the year in which the ceremony was held.)	Film	Category	Result	Ref.
1996	Ninne Pelladatha	Akkineni Award for Best Home-viewing Feature Film (as producer)	Won	
1997	Annamayya	Best Actor	Won	
2000	Prema Katha	Best Feature Film – Kansya (Bronze) (as producer)	Won	
2000	Yuvakudu	Special Jury Award (as producer)	Won	
2002	Santosham	Best Actor	Won	
2002	Manmadhudu	Best Feature Film – Swarna (Gold) (as producer)	Won	
2006	Sri Ramadasu	Best Actor	Won	
2011	Rajanna	Special Jury Award (Actor)	Won	
2011	Rajanna	Best Feature Film – Rajata (Silver) (as producer)	Won	
2014	Manam	Best Feature Film – Rajata (Silver) (Producer)	Won	

== National Film Awards ==
The National Film Awards are awarded by the Government of India's Directorate of Film Festivals division for achievements in the Indian film industry. Nagarjuna has received two awards.

Year	Film	Category	Result	Ref.
1997	Ninne Pelladata	Best Feature Film in Telugu (as producer)	Won	
1998	Annamayya	Special Mention	Won	

== South Indian International Movie Awards ==
The South Indian International Movie Awards are rewards the artistic and technical achievements of the South Indian film industry.

Year	Film	Category	Result	Ref.
2012	Rajanna	Best Actor – Telugu	Nominated	
2012	Rajanna	Special Appreciation – Best Actor	Won	
2015	Manam	Best Film – Telugu	Won	
2017	Oopiri	Best Actor – Telugu	Nominated	

== IIFA Utsavam ==
Year	Film	Category	Result	Ref.
2017	Oopiri	Best Performance in a Supporting Role – Male	Won	

== Other awards ==
Year	Film	Awards	Category	Result	Ref.
1986	Vikram	Vamsee Berkeley Awards	Best Actor	Won	
1989	Geetanjali	Andhra Pradesh Cinegoers Awards	Best Actor	Won	
1989	Geetanjali	Bharatamuni Awards	Best Actor	Won	
1989	Siva	Vamsee Berkley Awards	Best Actor	Won	
1989	Siva	Cinema Express Awards	Best Actor	Won	
1996	Ninne Pelladata	Akruthi Film Awards	Best Actor	Won	
1997	Annamayya	Screen Videocon Awards	Best Actor	Won	
1997	Annamayya	Bharatamuni Awards	Best Actor	Won	
2000	Azad	Andhra Pradesh Film Journalists Association Awards	Best Actor	Won	
2005	Mass	CineMAA Awards	Best Actor	Won	
2012	Rajanna	1st South Indian International Movie Awards	Special Appreciation (Actor)	Won	
2012	Rajanna	CineMAA Awards	Best Actor (Jury)	Won	
2013	Shirdi Sai	CineMAA Awards	Best Actor (Jury)	Won	

== See also ==
- Nagarjuna
- Akkineni Nagarjuna filmography
