= Kamakshi Movies =

Indian film production company

- Company type: Private
- Industry: Entertainment
- Founded: Hyderabad, Telangana in 1987
- Headquarters: Hyderabad, India
- Products: Films
- Owner: D. Siva Prasad Reddy

Kamakshi Movies is an Indian film production and distribution company established by D. Siva Prasad Reddy, an Indian film producer, in 1987. Ever since its inception, the production house has committed itself to making quality cinema, believing in sensible entertainment, and its cinema is imbued in pure Telugu nativity. Siva Prasad Reddy produced and distributed several Telugu films under the production house. Since 2008, after the retirement of Siva Prasad Reddy, his son, Chandan Reddy D. V., took over the production house. The company has collaborated mostly with Nagarjuna.

== Filmography ==
=== Production ===
Year	Title	Cast	Director	Notes	ref
1986	Sravana Sandhya	Sobhan Babu, Vijayashanti, Suhasini	A. Kodandarami Reddy		
1987	Karthika Pournami	Sobhan Babu, Radhika, Bhanupriya	A. Kodandarami Reddy		
1989	Vicky Daada	Nagarjuna, Radha, Juhi Chawla	A. Kodandarami Reddy		
1993	Mutha Mestri	Chiranjeevi, Meena, Roja, Sharat Saxena	A. Kodandarami Reddy		
1993	Allari Alludu	Akkineni Nagarjuna, Meena, Nagma, Vanisri	A. Kodandarami Reddy		
1998	Auto Driver	Akkineni Nagarjuna, Deepti Bhatnagar, Simran	Suresh Krishna		
1999	Seetharama Raju	Akkineni Nagarjuna, Nandamuri Harikrishna, Sakshi Shivanand, Sanghavi	Y. V. S. Chowdary		
1999	Hote Hote Pyar Ho Gaya	Jackie Shroff, Kajol, Atul Agnihotri	Firoz Irani	Hindi Movie	
2001	Eduruleni Manishi	Akkineni Nagarjuna, Soundarya, Shenaz Treasurywala	Jonnalagadda Srinivasa Rao		
2004	Nenunnanu	Akkineni Nagarjuna, Shriya Saran, Arti Agarwal	V. N. Aditya		
2006	Boss	Akkineni Nagarjuna, Nayantara, Poonam Bajwa	V. N. Aditya		
2008	King	Akkineni Nagarjuna, Trisha, Mamta Mohandas, Srihari	Sreenu Vaitla		
2010	Kedi	Akkineni Nagarjuna, Mamta Mohandas	Kiran Kumar		
2010	Ragada	Akkineni Nagarjuna, Anushka Shetty, Priyamani	Veeru Potla		
2011	Dhada	Naga Chaitanya Akkineni, Kajal Aggarwal	Ajay Bhuyan		
2013	Greeku Veerudu	Akkineni Nagarjuna, Nayantara	K. Dasarath		

=== Distribution ===
Year	Title	Cast	Director	Notes	ref
2008	Pourudu	Sumanth, Kajal Aggarwal	Raj Aditya		
2010	Panchakshari	Anushka Shetty, Samrat Reddy	V. Samudra		
2018	Officer	Nagarjuna, Myra Sareen	Ram Gopal Varma		
