= Surya Putrulu =

- Audio Cassette Cover
- Directed by: C. Umamaheswara Rao
- Produced by: D. Mohana Ramchandra Reddy
- Starring: Mammootty; Suman; Shobana; Nagma; Malashri
- Music by: M. M. Keeravani
- Release date: 14 March 1997
- Country: India
- Language: Telugu

Surya Putrulu (transl. Sons of the Sun) is a 1997 Indian Telugu-language drama film directed by C. Umamaheswara Rao. The film stars Mammootty, Suman, Shobana, Nagma and Malashri. This marked Shobana's last Telugu film as a leading actress. This movie is famous for the erotic first night song picturised on Nagma. Later dubbed into Tamil as Prathinidhi.

== Cast ==
- Mammooty
- Suman
- Shobana
- Nagma
- Malashri
- Rajeev Kanakala
- Raghunatha Reddy

== Soundtrack ==
All music is composed by M. M. Keeravani

Track list
No.	Title	Lyrics	Singer(s)	Length
1.	"Ee Chalilo Gililo"	Sirivennela Seetharama Sastry	S. P. Balasubrahmanyam, K. S. Chithra	4:39
2.	"Chakkani Vennela"	Bhuvanachandra	K. S. Chithra, Chorus	6:09
3.	"Vedi Vedi"	Sirivennela Seetharama Sastry	S. P. Balasubrahmanyam, K. S. Chithra, Chorus	4:47
4.	"Peesu Peesu Polisu"	Jaladi Raja Rao	S. P. Balasubrahmanyam, Mano, Lalitha Sagari	4:41
5.	"Epadu"	Vennelakanti	S. P. Balasubrahmanyam, K. S. Chithra, Chorus	4:53
Total length:				25:11
