= Nagma =

Indian actress

- Nagma in 2012
- Born: Nandita Arvind Morarji; 25 December 1974 (age 51); Bombay (now Mumbai), Maharashtra, India
- Education: Mumbai University (B. Com.)
- Occupations: Actor; politician
- Years active: 1990–2008 (actress); 2004–present (politician)
- Political party: Indian National Congress
- Relatives: Roshini (half-sister); Jyothika (half-sister); Suriya (brother-in-law)

Nagma Arvind Morarji (born Nandita Arvind Morarji; 25 December 1974), known mononymously as Nagma. is an Indian politician and former actress. She gained prominence as a leading actress in the 1990s and appeared in films across various Indian languages, primarily in Telugu, Hindi, Tamil and Bhojpuri.

Nagma made her film debut in Baaghi (1990) opposite Salman Khan, which was the seventh highest-grossing Hindi film of the year. She went on to star in several notable films, including Gharana Mogudu (1992), King Uncle (1993), Varasudu (1993), Suhaag (1994), Kaadhalan (1994), Baashha (1995), and Lal Baadshah (1999).

== Early and personal life ==
Nagma was born in Bombay (now Mumbai), Maharashtra, as Nandita Arvind Morarji on 25 December 1974. Her father is Arvind Morarji, whose forefathers hailed from Jaisalmer, Rajasthan, later migrating to Porbandar, Gujarat, and finally Mumbai. Her grandfather Gokuldas Morarji was a reputed businessman in the shipping, textile, agricultural, and pharmaceutical industries.

Nagma's mother, Seema, originally named Shama Kazi, is a Muslim belonging to the Kazi freedom fighter family. She married Morarji in 1969 at the CCI Club in Mumbai but separated from him in 1974. After divorcing Morarji in August 1974, Nagma's mother married Chander Sadanah, a film producer, in March 1975, with whom she had three children, including two daughters, actresses Jyothika and Roshini (born Radhika).

Nagma was educated at Mount Mary Convent High School in Mumbai. She then did her graduation in Commerce from R. D. National College of Mumbai University.

Nagma remained close to her biological father until his death on 31 December 2005. She explained to a Mumbai reporter, "I am proud of the fact that I belong to a respectable family. My mother was legally married to my father, the late Shri Arvind Morarji, at a public function at the CCI Club, Mumbai." It was Nagma's mother who encouraged her to become an actress and is said to have been her "constant companion on the film sets" for several years.

Nagma is a practising Christian. She was baptised in the year 2007.

== Acting career ==
Nagma's debut film Baghi: A Rebel for Love, opposite Salman Khan was Hindi cinema's seventh highest-grossing film in 1990. With Karisma Kapoor, she was also one of the female leads in 1994's Suhaag with Ajay Devgan and Akshay Kumar. Following these films, she acted in Telugu and Tamil films at the behest of her friend Divya Bharti. Explaining her shift, she cited what she was more conscious of the quality of work, in terms of meaty roles and her flair to travel throughout India understanding different cultures and her drive and passion to get acclamation from all over India. She stated "Language was never a barrier. I love adventure, culture and have great respect for the Indian tradition".

Her Telugu films include Gharana Mogudu with Chiranjeevi, Allari Alludu with Nagarjuna Akkineni and Major Chandrakanth with N. T. Rama Rao and Mohan Babu. Her Tamil films include Kaadhalan with Prabhu Deva, Baashha with Rajinikanth and Villadhi Villain with Sathyaraj in which she played her most glamour part and begin to tempt the Tamil audience and her performance gained her a unanimous praises for her glamour role time.

After moving back to Mumbai, she focused on supporting roles in Hindi films like the 2000s Chal Mere Bhai, which reunited her with former co-stars Karisma Kapoor, Salman Khan and Sanjay Dutt. While based in Mumbai, she continued to work in some Telugu and Tamil films, such as Allari Ramudu and Citizen, as well as taking leading roles in some Malayalam films including Chathurangam.

Nagma has acted in Bhojpuri films, including films with the Big Boss participant Ravi Kishan. She won a Best Actress award at the 2005 Bhojpuri Film Awards for her performance in Dulha Milal Dildar. In 2006's Ganga, she starred in the title role opposite Amitabh Bachchan and Hema Malini. When asked why she shifted to Bhojpuri films, she said "I wanted to do films in different languages. I have already done films in 10 languages. My first Bhojpuri film Panditji Bataayina Biyaah Kab Hoii was a huge hit. After that, the offers poured in and they were too good to be ignored." When interviewed by The Hindu in Delhi in April 2007, she indicated that another important reason for her decision to focus on Bhojpuri films was to help with her political campaigning.

In 2006, she made her Punjabi film debut, starring alongside Raj Babbar in Ek Jind Ek Jaan.

Discussing her career in a Mid-Day interview in September 2006, Nagma said "I have learned nine languages, so I want to do films in all languages. On the Hindi film front, I am in the process of signing a very big period thriller. I am getting to do a variety of roles with content, so I am satisfied." While noting her commitment to complete several Bhojpuri films she was involved with, in March 2007, she expressed her intention to next focus on returning to Hindi films after wrapping up her projects. In her 2007 Hindustan Times interview, in which she discusses her future plans for cinema and politics, Nagma responded to a question about her reputation for controversy by saying "You need guts to deal with controversies. Of course, whether it's for negative or positive reasons, I’ve always been in the news."

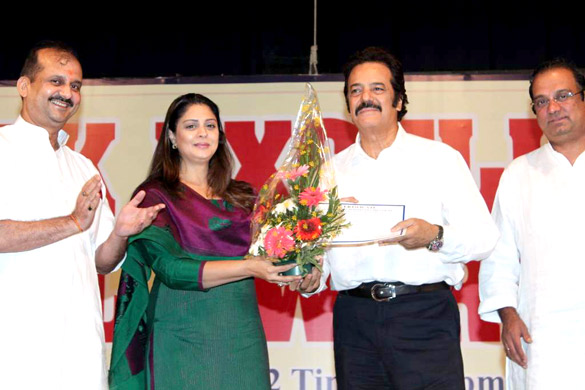
Nagma at RK Excellence Awards

== Politics ==
It was reported that Bharatiya Janata Party (BJP) wanted to field Nagma as a candidate from Hyderabad for the 2004 General Lok Sabha Elections. But she decided to join Congress in 2004 and campaigned in Andhra Pradesh. She cited Congress party's "commitment towards secularism and welfare of the poor and weaker sections" as her reason for joining it. After joining the Congress, Nagma has reportedly said that she first supported the Congress party because of her admiration for Rajiv Gandhi.

She contested 2014 Lok Sabha elections from Meerut as Congress candidate, securing fourth position with 42,911 votes. She lost her deposit.

In a 2006 interview, she made a direct link between her family history and her political activism: "My mom is Muslim and my dad is Hindu. We were brought up to respect all religions. She said "I personally experienced the Love of Jesus Christ from early on and His uniqueness and identifies herself as a Christian. Communal riots pained me. I wanted to do something. So I joined politics." She had to turn down an offer to run for India's Lok Sabha in 2003 due to her many film commitments. "If I wanted to become a member of Parliament I would need to give 100 per cent to my constituency — which I could not at that point of time." In an interview with the Hindustan Times in 2007, she said "politics will continue".

Nagma was appointed the general secretary of All India Mahila Congress in 2015.

== Filmography ==
Year	Film	Role	Language	Notes
1990	Baaghi: A Rebel for Love	Kaajal aka Paro	Hindi	Debut film
1991	Peddinti Alludu	Geeta	Telugu	Debut in Telugu
1991	Killer	Priya	Telugu	
1992	Gharana Mogudu	Uma Devi	Telugu	Nominated-Filmfare Award for Best Actress – Telugu
1992	Bewaffa Se Waffa	Nagma	Hindi	
1992	Dilwale Kabhi Na Hare	Anjali Oberoi	Hindi	
1992	Police Aur Mujrim	Meena Khanna	Hindi	
1992	Yalgaar	Anu Singhal	Hindi	
1992	Aswamedham	Sowjanya	Telugu	
1993	King Uncle	Kavita	Hindi	
1993	Major Chandrakanth	Seetha	Telugu	
1993	Varasudu	Keerthi	Telugu	
1993	Hasti	Neena Narang	Hindi	
1993	Kondapalli Raja	Subbalakshmi	Telugu	
1993	Dhartiputra	Lisa	Hindi	
1993	Allari Alludu	Sravani	Telugu	
1993	Rendilla Poojari		Telugu	
1993	Green Snake	Bharatanatyam dancer	Cantonese; Mandarin Chinese	credited as Najma
1994	Mugguru Monagallu	Rani	Telugu	
1994	Super Police	Roja	Telugu	
1994	Gang Master	Sandhya	Telugu	
1994	Aavesam		Telugu	
1994	Kaadhalan	Sruthi	Tamil	Nominated — Filmfare Award for Best Actress — Tamil
1994	Suhaag	Madhu	Hindi	
1995	Baashha	Priya	Tamil	
1995	Mounam	Manjari	Telugu	
1995	Ragasiya Police	Raji	Tamil	
1995	Villadhi Villain	Janaki	Tamil	
1995	Anna		Malayalam	Unreleased
1995	Rikshavodu	Rani	Telugu	
1995	Adavi Dora	Priya	Telugu	
1995	Bharatha Simham		Telugu	
1996	Love Birds	Mridula	Tamil	
1996	Saradha Bullodu	Nirmala Devi	Telugu	
1996	Mettukudi	Indhu	Tamil	
1997	Kaun Rokega Mujhe	Nisha	Hindi	
1997	Periya Thambi	Selvi	Tamil	
1997	Aravindhan	Anu	Tamil	
1997	Surya Putrulu		Telugu	
1997	Janakiraman	Indhu	Tamil	
1997	Pistha	Venilla	Tamil	
1998	Sreekrishnapurathe Nakshathrathilakkam	Yamuna Rani	Malayalam	
1998	Kurubana Rani	Rani	Kannada	
1998	Vaettiya Madichu Kattu	Pooja Jaiprakash	Tamil	
1999	Maya	Lakshmi	Tamil	Dubbed in Hindi as Sai Teri Maya
1999	Jayasoorya	Lakshmi	Kannada	
1999	Lal Baadshah		Hindi	Special appearance
1999	Ravimama		Kannada	
2000	Kunwara	Sharmila Singh	Hindi	
2000	Chal Mere Bhai	Sonia	Hindi	Guest appearance
2000	Papa The Great	Pooja Jai Prakash	Hindi	
2001	Dheena		Tamil	Special appearance in the song "Vathikuchi Pathikadhuda"
2001	Ek Rishtaa: The Bond of Love		Hindi	Special appearance
2001	Citizen	CBI Sarojini Harichandran	Tamil	
2001	Yeh Teraa Ghar Yeh Meraa Ghar	Anupama Verma	Hindi	Special appearance
2002	Chathurangam	Nayana Pillai	Malayalam	
2002	Allari Ramudu	Chamundeswari	Telugu	
2002	Ninu Choodaka Nenundalenu		Telugu	Special appearance
2003	Hrudayavantha		Kannada	
2004	Ab Tumhare Hawale Watan Saathiyo	Aarti V. Singh	Hindi	
2005	Dulha Milal Dildar		Bhojpuri	Won - Bhojpuri Film Award for Best Actress
2005	Panditji Batai Na Byah Kab Hoi		Bhojpuri	
2005	Parinam	Nisha	Bengali	
2006	Ek Jind Ek Jaan	Nimmi	Punjabi	
2006	Ganga	Ganga	Bhojpuri	Won - Bhojpuri Film Award for Best Actress
2006	Ab Ta Banja Sajnwa Hamaar		Bhojpuri	
2006	Mai Baap		Bhojpuri	
2006	Dil Diwana Tohar Ho Gayil		Bhojpuri	
2006	Raja Thakur		Bhojpuri	
2007	Back To Honeymoon		Hindi	
2007	Thamb Lakshmi Thamb	Lakshmi	Marathi	
2007	Tu Hamaar Hou		Bhojpuri	
2007	Janam Janam Ke Saath		Bhojpuri	
2008	Hanuman Bhakt Hawaldaar		Bhojpuri	
2008	Thela No 501		Bhojpuri	

== Awards and nominations ==
She is a recipient of Bhojpuri Film Awards two times. She won Best Actress at the first Bhojpuri Film Awards for her performance in Dulha Milal Dildar. Later in 2007, she was honoured again for the same for the 2006 film Ganga, in which she played the titular role.

She was nominated at Filmfare Awards South for her work in Telugu and Tamil film industry. She was seen as the female lead in Gharana Mogudu, Telugu-language film directed by K. Raghavendra Rao, opposite Chiranjeevi, for which she was nominated her first Filmfare Award for Best Actress – Telugu. She lost the award to Revathy for Ankuram . Second time, she was nominated for the Filmfare Award for Best Actress – Tamil at 42nd Filmfare Awards South, for her role in Kaadhalan, but lost to Revathi again for Priyanka (1994 film), but the team won Best Director – Tamil for S. Shankar & Music Director – Tamil for A. R. Rahman.

In 2013, the Jaipur International Film Festival (JIFF) decided to honour Nagma with a lifetime achievement award, but issued the award to Sharmila Tagore instead. Nagma, who was 39 years old at the time, said, "I thought I was too young for the award, but they convinced me. They said I had been selected because of my contribution to Indian cinema". JIFF's director, Hanuman Chaudhary, said that the change was due to Nagma not responding to their invitation, but Nagma recounted to Times of India that she accepted their invitation officially.

Year	Award	Category	Film	Result
1992	Filmfare Awards South	Best Actress – Telugu	Gharana Mogudu	Nominated
1994	Filmfare Awards South	Best Actress – Tamil	Kaadhalan	Nominated
2006	Bhojpuri Film Awards	Best Actress	Dulha Milal Dildar	Won
2007	Bhojpuri Film Awards	Best Actress	Ganga	Won

== See also ==
- List of Bhojpuri actresses
