= Janakiraman =

1997 film by Sundar C.

- Poster
- Directed by: Sundar C
- Screenplay by: Sundar C
- Story by: K. Selva Bharathy
- Produced by: Malar K. Balu; K. Dhandapani
- Starring: Sarathkumar; Nagma; Rambha
- Cinematography: U. K. Senthil Kumar
- Edited by: P. Sai Suresh
- Music by: Sirpy
- Production company: Malar Films
- Release date: 31 October 1997
- Country: India
- Language: Tamil

Janakiraman (/dʒɑːnəkirɑːmən/) is a 1997 Indian Tamil-language comedy drama film directed and co-written by Sundar C. The film stars Sarathkumar and Nagma whilst Rambha, Goundamani and Manivannan play supporting roles. It was released on 31 October 1997, during Diwali, and became a commercial success.

== Plot ==
Janakiraman lives with his brother. Their uncle (Sundarrajan) is a devotee of Hanuman and trains the two brothers to live as bachelors and not to interact with girls.

Meanwhile, Kumarasaamy, another one of Janakiraman's uncles, wants to get his two daughters married to the two brothers. So when Sundarrajan goes out of town, Kumarasaamy dresses up as Hanuman and comes to Janakiraman's bedroom and advices him to get married. He even tells him that the girl will arrive at Hanuman temple wearing the outfits of a colour he had suggested.

Kumarasaamy then gets his daughters to dress up according to the colour combination however Janakiraman gets confused switches the colour combination of the blouse and meets Indhu instead.

Indhu is not happy living with her sisters because her two brothers-in-law want to marry her as their second wife to grab her property. So Janakiraman and Indhu plans to get married; and on the wedding day Anandaraj sets up a duplicate bride (to be switched with Indhu) Meanwhile, Kumarasaamy arranges the marriage of one of his daughter with Janakiraman (with the same idea as Anandaraj) to be held on the same day and in the same wedding hall as Janakiraman and Indhu's wedding. So all the four girls (Indhu, Kumarasaamy's two daughters, and the duplicate bride) wear exactly similar sarees, their faces covered with hanging flowers, get switched. The confusion somehow brings Janakiraman and Indhu together and they get married; which disappoints Kumarasaamy and Anandaraj.

Janakiraman and Indhu's life is short-lived after a woman named Gayathri arrives and claims to be Janakiraman's first wife. Indhu believes it to be true and assumes Janaki for betraying her. After much confusion when confronted by Janaki, Gayathri narrates her real reason for her act.

During her childhood, her mother was forced to indulged in prostitution for money but she falls ill in her old age. To cure her mother, she had to accept Anandraj's order to wreak havoc in Janaki's life by pretending as his wife. In the climax, Indhu and Gayatri gets abducted by the villains and will be saved by Janaki.

Gayathri whose mother's health is cured leaves the place. Sundarrajan who had been a bachelor till then marries a Malayalam-speaking woman.

== Cast ==
- Sarathkumar as Janakiraman
- Nagma as Indhu
- Rambha as Gayathri
- Ponnambalam
- R. Sundarrajan as Janakiraman's uncle
- Anandaraj as Ponnusaamy
- Manivannan as Kumarasaamy
- Goundamani
- Senthil
- Roopa Sree as Lalitha
- K. R. Vatsala

== Production ==
Portions of the film were shot in Gobichettipalayam. During the making of the film, it was alleged that Sarathkumar and Nagma were seeing each other. Furthermore, it was alleged that Nagma and Rambha were uncomfortable with each other's presence in the film.

== Music ==
The music was composed by Sirpy, with lyrics by Palani Bharathi.

Song	Singers
"Hawaliya Hawaliya"	Sanjeev Adwani, Sowmya Raoh
"Hey Cha Cha Kadalicha"	Hariharan, Nirmala
"Kadal Solla Varthai"	Hariharan, K. S. Chitra
"Pottu Mela Pottu"	S. P. Balasubrahmanyam, Anuradha Sriram
"Yenadi Kanne"	Mano, Sujatha, Sirpy, Joseph

== Critical reception ==
K. N. Vijiyan of New Straits Times gave the film a positive review, appreciating the story and music but criticising the final fight sequence for lack of originality. Ji of Kalki felt forced stunt scenes for Sarathkumar and sad flashback of Rambha were boring, panned Manivannan's characterisation but praised Goundamani whose humour works out than other actors.
