= Mounam =

- Directed by: C. Umamaheswara Rao
- Written by: C. Umamaheswara Rao
- Produced by: Arvind Swamy
- Starring: Arvind Swamy; Nagma; Charu Hassan; Raghuvaran
- Music by: M. M. Keeravani
- Release date: 10 September 1995
- Running time: 137 mins
- Language: Telugu

Mounam (transl. Silence) is a 1995 Telugu-language thriller film directed by C. Umamaheswara Rao. The film revolves around a political-criminal nexus, a married couple and a nuclear scientist. It was released in Tamil as Mouna Yudham.

== Plot ==
Kiran is a police inspector in Hyderabad. His beautiful and alluring wife Manjari is a reputed actress. Misunderstanding creep into their relationship and they do not live together. Their only son Raju lives with his mother Manjari. Raju's only friend is Narayan and they go to school together. Some politicians plan to kill Dr. Hameed Ali, a well known nuclear scientist. But a thief learns of their plan.

In this closed-door meeting is also the involvement of the Police Commissioner. The thief makes a video recording of the meeting, but he is caught. He is shot and wounded, trips and falls down and the gang of four manage to follow him, but the thief escapes. He meets Raju and Narayan, who are on a visit to an isolated temple near the hillside. Raju and Narayan are bewildered and do not know what to do. But the clever and shrewd Raju tells Narayan that they will remain quiet and will not reveal anything to anybody about the incriminating tape. But the killers see Raju and chase him to death because Raju saw the murders. The task of nabbing the killer is given to Kiran, Raju's father, who takes precautions for his son. Dr. Hameed has now called the delegation of All World Scientists and Mr. X, who is the master planner of the murder of Dr. Hameed Ali, enters the meeting. A bomb is planted near the dais by Mr. X, where Dr. Hameed Ali is about to preside.

== Cast ==
- Arvind Swamy as Kiran
- Nagma as Manjari Kiran
- Charu Hassan as a scientist
- Raghuvaran as a hitman
- Master Anil Raj as Raju
- Vijayachander
- Haribabu
- Sivaji Raja as a thief
- Jeeva
- Dilip Kumar Salvadi as Kiran's son
- Raju Sundaram in the song "Dhammaro Abbaya Raro"
- Nirosha in the song "Dhammaro Abbaya Raro"

== Soundtrack ==
All music is composed by M. M. Keeravani

Track list
No.	Title	Lyrics	Singer(s)	Length
1.	"Happy New Year"	Sirivennela Seetharama Sastry	Malgudi Subha	4:20
2.	"Bag Lingampally Porinra Baga"	Sahithi	Swarnalatha, Chorus	5:11
3.	"Abba Yem Chaatugundo"	Sirivennela Seetharama Sastry	S. P. Balasubrahmanyam, K. S. Chithra	4:19
4.	"Budungu Budungu Budungu Budungu"	Sirivennela Seetharama Sastry	Mano, K. S. Chithra, Sindhu	6:39
5.	"Ontaraina Gundelo"	Sirivennela Seetharama Sastry	S. P. Balasubrahmanyam, K. S. Chithra	5:08
6.	"Dhammaro Abbaya Raro"	Sirivennela Seetharama Sastry	Malgudi Subha, Chorus	4:42
Total length:				31:07

== Reception ==
A critic from New Straits Times opined that the film "rises above the normal movies through the polished efforts of director Uma Maheswara Rao".
