= Major Chandrakanth (1993 film) =

1993 Telugu film by K. Raghavendra Rao

- Theatrical release poster
- Directed by: K. Raghavendra Rao
- Written by: Paruchuri Brothers (Story & dialogues)
- Produced by: Mohan Babu; Master Manchu Manoj(Presenter)
- Starring: N. T. Rama Rao; Mohan Babu; Nagma; Ramya Krishna; Sarada
- Cinematography: A. Vincent; Ajayan Vincent
- Edited by: Gautham Raju
- Music by: M. M. Keeravani
- Production company: Sree Lakshmi Prasanna Pictures
- Release date: 23 April 1993
- Country: India
- Language: Telugu

Major Chandrakanth is a 1993 Indian Telugu-language action drama film directed by K. Raghavendra Rao and written by the Paruchuri brothers. Produced by Mohan Babu under the Sree Lakshmi Prasanna Pictures banner, the film stars N. T. Rama Rao in the title role, alongside Mohan Babu, Nagma, Ramya Krishna, Sarada, and Amrish Puri. The music for the film was composed by M. M. Keeravani.

The film released on 23 April 1993 and was a major box office success. The film's success was boosted by a popular soundtrack, especially the song "Punyabhumi Na Desam." The film marked N. T. Rama Rao's final acting performance, even though Srinatha Kavi Sarvabhoumudu (1993) released later. While Major Chandrakanth was completed after Srinatha Kavi Sarvabhoumudu, it was released earlier.

== Plot ==
Major Chandrakanth is a patriotic hero awarded the Param Vir Chakra for saving foreign delegates from the terrorist GK. During the mission, his close friend Major Rajasekhar is fatally injured. Before his death, Rajasekhar asks Chandrakanth to ensure that his daughter Sita marries his son, Sivaji. However, due to unforeseen circumstances, Sivaji becomes involved in crime, joining forces with a girl named Hema. Unbeknownst to him, Sivaji works for the corrupt politician and MP Gnaneswara Rao, who causes chaos in society with his five sons.

Sivaji unknowingly encounters Sita, and while evading the police, accidentally ties the sacred thread to her during a mass wedding ceremony. Meanwhile, Chandrakanth returns home to his family, which includes his wife Savitri and daughters Bharati and Jhansi, and begins confronting Gnaneswara Rao's criminal activities. During protests against political injustices, Chandrakanth suffers baton blows. Sivaji, puzzled by his father’s actions, questions why he involves himself in such struggles. In response, Chandrakanth passionately explains his patriotism, inspiring his family. This deeply impacts Sivaji, who undergoes a transformation, resolves to abandon his deceitful ways, and decides to leave his criminal past behind. However, Gnaneswara Rao retaliates by having Sivaji arrested, and Chandrakanth collapses from his injuries.

When Chandrakanth confronts Sivaji in anger about his past actions, Sivaji explains the circumstances that led to his transformation. While Chandrakanth was stationed at the border, Sivaji was forced to commit fraud to save his brother-in-law. What started as a one-time action soon became a habit, leading him into a life of deception. Despite understanding this, Chandrakanth disapproves of Sivaji’s actions, causing Sivaji to leave home. With Hema’s help, he sets out to expose the real culprits. Seeing Sivaji’s reformation, Chandrakanth is moved and learns of his marriage to Sita, eventually accepting their union with pride.

Chandrakanth arranges a marriage for Jhansi with Inspector Raju, the son of a pacifist named Swarajya Rao. However, Jhansi is in love with Gnaneswara Rao's son Lokesh, and Gnaneswara Rao attempts to sabotage the marriage. Despite this, Chandrakanth successfully ensures the marriage takes place. Tragedy strikes when Savitri is diagnosed with terminal cancer and Gnaneswara Rao teams up with GK to create further havoc. Hema and Sivaji follow them, but Hema dies in the process.

Chandrakanth exposes Gnaneswara Rao’s crimes in court, but Gnaneswara Rao escapes using false alibis. Soon after, Savitri passes away, and Chandrakanth vows to destroy the corrupt forces. Gnaneswara Rao captures Chandrakanth, attempting to force him to reveal border secrets. Meanwhile, Sivaji collects evidence against Gnaneswara Rao. After Gnaneswara Rao kidnaps Chandrakanth’s family, both Sivaji and Chandrakanth fight to rescue them. Chandrakanth presents the evidence in the assembly, declaring that criminals like Gnaneswara Rao endanger the nation, and hands him over to the people's representatives. The story ends with Chandrakanth succumbing to his injuries.

== Cast ==
- N. T. Rama Rao as Major Chandrakanth
- Mohan Babu as Sivaji
- Nagma as Sita (Voice dubbed by Roja Ramani)
- Ramya Krishna as Hema (Voice dubbed by Roja Ramani)
- Sarada as Savitri
- Amrish Puri as MP Gnaneswara Rao
- Brahmanandam as Rangaraju Rickshawala
- Babu Mohan as Pulla Rao
- Srihari as Gnaneswara Rao's elder son
- Saikumar as Lokesh
- Rakhee as G.K.
- Kinnera as Jhansi
- Sudha as Dr. Bharati
- Gummadi as Swarajya Rao
- Achyuth as Inspector Raju
- M. Balayya as Major Rajasekhar
- Paruchuri Gopala Krishna as Minister Subbarayadu
- Rallapalli
- Narra Venkateswara Rao as Lawyer
- Chalapathi Rao as Doctor
- Vinod as Inspector
- Prasad Babu as Major Chandrakanth's son-in-law
- Navabharat Balaji as Gnaneswara Rao's younger son
- Ananth as Bridegroom
- Ironleg Sastri as Dr. Parvathalu
- Annapurna as Parvathi
- Siva Parvathi
- Shilpa
- Master Manchu Manoj Kumar as Major Chandrakanth's grandson
- Baby Sreshta as Major Chandrakanth's granddaughter

== Production ==
=== Development ===
N. T. Rama Rao intended to make a film to raise funds for the construction of the Basavatarakam Medical Trust Building and publicly shared this plan with the media. Responding to this, Mohan Babu proposed the project Major Chandrakanth and secured his approval. The film marked the 12th production under Mohan Babu’s Sree Lakshmi Prasanna Pictures banner and the 12th collaboration between N. T. Rama Rao and director K. Raghavendra Rao. The script, developed by the Paruchuri Brothers, was designed to highlight Rama Rao’s role, ensuring his character remained central to the narrative.

Major Chandrakanth marked N. T. Rama Rao's final acting performance, even though Srinatha Kavi Sarvabhoumudu (1993) was released later. The film was completed after Srinatha Kavi Sarvabhoumudu but released earlier.

=== Casting ===
Rama Rao portrayed the titular role of Major Chandrakanth, marking his return to social drama after nearly a decade. Sarada played a key role as his wife. Mohan Babu, who often appeared as an antagonist in Rama Rao's earlier films, played the second lead, paired with Nagma and Ramya Krishna. Many renowned actors expressed a desire to work alongside Rama Rao in the film. Manchu Manoj, Mohan Babu’s son, appeared as a child actor in the film, portraying one of Rama Rao’s grandchildren, and was also credited as the presenter of the film.

=== Filming ===
The film was officially launched on 20 November 1992, at Ramakrishna Cine Studios in Nacharam, Hyderabad. The event included Chandrababu Naidu switching on the camera and Lakshmi Prasanna giving the first clap.

Filming took place in various locations, including Rajahmundry, Araku Valley, Delhi, Kulu Manali, and Kashmir. Scenes were also shot among army personnel in Chandigarh. On the final day of shooting, after completing the film, the entire crew became emotional as N. T. Rama Rao left the set.

One of the standout songs, "Punyabhumi Na Desam," written by Jaladi, featured Rama Rao portraying several iconic figures, including Chhatrapati Shivaji, Alluri Sitaramaraju, Veerapandya Kattabrahmana, and Subhash Chandra Bose.

== Music ==
Major Chandrakanth

Film score by M. M. Keeravani
- Released: 1993
- Genre: Soundtrack
- Length: 34:39
- Producer: M. M. Keeravani

M. M. Keeravani chronology
Pratap (1993)	Major Chandrakanth (1993)	Varasudu (1993)

The music for Major Chandrakanth was composed by M. M. Keeravani, with lyrics written by Jaladi, Keeravani, Rasaraju, and Gurucharan.

"Punyabhumi Na Desam," written by Jaladi, gained significant acclaim and continues to inspire audiences. It is frequently played during national holidays. Other songs from the film, including "Muddulatho Onamaalu," "Uliki Padaku Allari Moguda," and "Neekkavalsindi," also became popular and contributed to the film's appeal.

No.	Title	Lyrics	Singer(s)	Length
1.	"Punyabhoomi Naadesam"	Jaladi	S. P. Balasubrahmanyam	6:25
2.	"Muddulatho Onamalu"	M. M. Keeravani	K. J. Yesudas, K. S. Chithra	4:46
3.	"Uliki Padaku Allari Moguda"	Rasaraju	S. P. Balasubrahmanyam, K. S. Chithra	4:17
4.	"Bunga Moothi"	Gurucharan	S. P. Balasubrahmanyam, K. S. Chithra	4:47
5.	"Lappam Tappam Gallaki"	Gurucharan	S. P. Balasubrahmanyam, K. S. Chithra	5:29
6.	"Neekkavalsindi"	Gurucharan	Mano, K. S. Chithra	4:40
7.	"Sukhibhava Sumangali"	Jaladi	S. P. Balasubrahmanyam, K. S. Chithra, Ramana	4:15
Total length:				34:39

== Reception ==
=== Critical response ===
Sita of Sivaranjani magazine appreciated Rama Rao's performance, in addition of praising story and technical aspects of the film. On the other hand, Zamin Ryot critic Alluru Rahim gave a more mixed review about the story and screenplay but appreciated Rama Rao's zeal for acting in the film.

As Rama Rao's final film, Major Chandrakanth remains a key film in his cinematic career.

=== Box office ===
The film achieved significant success and celebrated its centenary in multiple centers, with a prominent 100-day celebration event held in Tirupati.

During the event, N. T. Rama Rao announced his plans to marry Lakshmi Parvathi, which attracted widespread media attention. This led analysts to predict shifts in the state’s political landscape. However, despite these predictions, Rama Rao's Telugu Desam Party triumphed in the 1994 Assembly elections, reducing the Congress Party to just 26 seats.
