= Auto Driver =

- Theatrical release poster
- Directed by: Suresh Krishna
- Written by: Posani Krishna Murali (dialogues)
- Screenplay by: Suresh Krishna; Bhupathi Raja
- Story by: Bhupathi Raja
- Produced by: D. Siva Prasad Reddy
- Starring: Nagarjuna; Deepti Bhatnagar; Simran
- Cinematography: S. Saravanan
- Edited by: Shankar
- Music by: Deva
- Production company: Kamakshi Movies
- Release date: 24 April 1998
- Country: India
- Language: Telugu

Auto Driver is a 1998 Indian Telugu film, produced by D. Siva Prasad Reddy under the Kamakshi Movies banner, directed by Suresh Krishna. It stars Nagarjuna, Deepti Bhatnagar and Simran, with music composed by Deva. It was dubbed into Tamil as Autokaran. The film was a box office failure.

== Plot ==
It tells the story of an importable auto driver who falls in love with a college student. They live happily until the girl's father rejects their love and a villain is also into the girl. Who is the villain and how the auto driver convinces the heroine's love to her father forms the rest of the story.

== Cast ==
- Nagarjuna as Jagan, Auto Driver
- Deepti Bhatnagar as Sravani
- Simran as Sandhya
- Vijayakumar as Sravani's father
- Dara Singh as Guru
- Mahesh Anand as Surya
- Ajay Rathnam as Nagaraj
- Kolla Ashok Kumar as Sravani's father's PA
- Kota Srinivasa Rao as Auto Driver Saidul
- Brahmanandam as Auto Driver
- Sudhakar
- Babu Mohan as Mental patient / BPL Johnny, Bus driver
- M.S. Narayana
- AVS as Astrologer
- Rallapalli as Sravani's driver
- Rajiv Kanakala as Jagan's brother-in-law
- Ananth Babu as Ananth
- Gundu Hanumantha Rao as Auto Driver
- Kallu Chidambaram as Auto Driver
- Gautam Raju as Auto Driver
- Jenny as Doctor
- Sujatha as Jagan's mother
- Siva Pavathi
- Krishnasri

== Soundtrack ==
Auto Driver

Film score by Deva
- Released: 1998
- Genre: Soundtrack
- Length: 31:44
- Label: Aditya Music
- Producer: Deva

Deva chronology
Master (1998)	Auto Driver (1998)	Tholi Prema (1998)

Music was composed by Deva. Music was released on ADITYA Music Company. The Tamil versions were penned by Piraisoodan.

No.	Title	Lyrics	Singer(s)	Length
1.	"Autowala"	Veturi	S. P. Balasubrahmanyam	5:26
2.	"Chandamama"	Veturi	Hariharan, Sujatha	6:21
3.	"Akkineni Akkineni"	Sirivennela Sitarama Sastry	Rajesh, Sujatha	5:47
4.	"Emo Emo"	Veturi	S. P. Balasubrahmanyam, Sujatha	4:25
5.	"Abbayi Abbayi Naku"	Sirivennela Sitarama Sastry	S. P. Balasubrahmanyam, Sujatha	4:57
6.	"Mama Mazare"	Veturi	S. P. Balasubrahmanyam, Sujatha, Swarnalatha	5:24
Total length:				31:44
