= C. Umamaheswara Rao =

Indian filmmaker

C. Uma Maheswara Rao
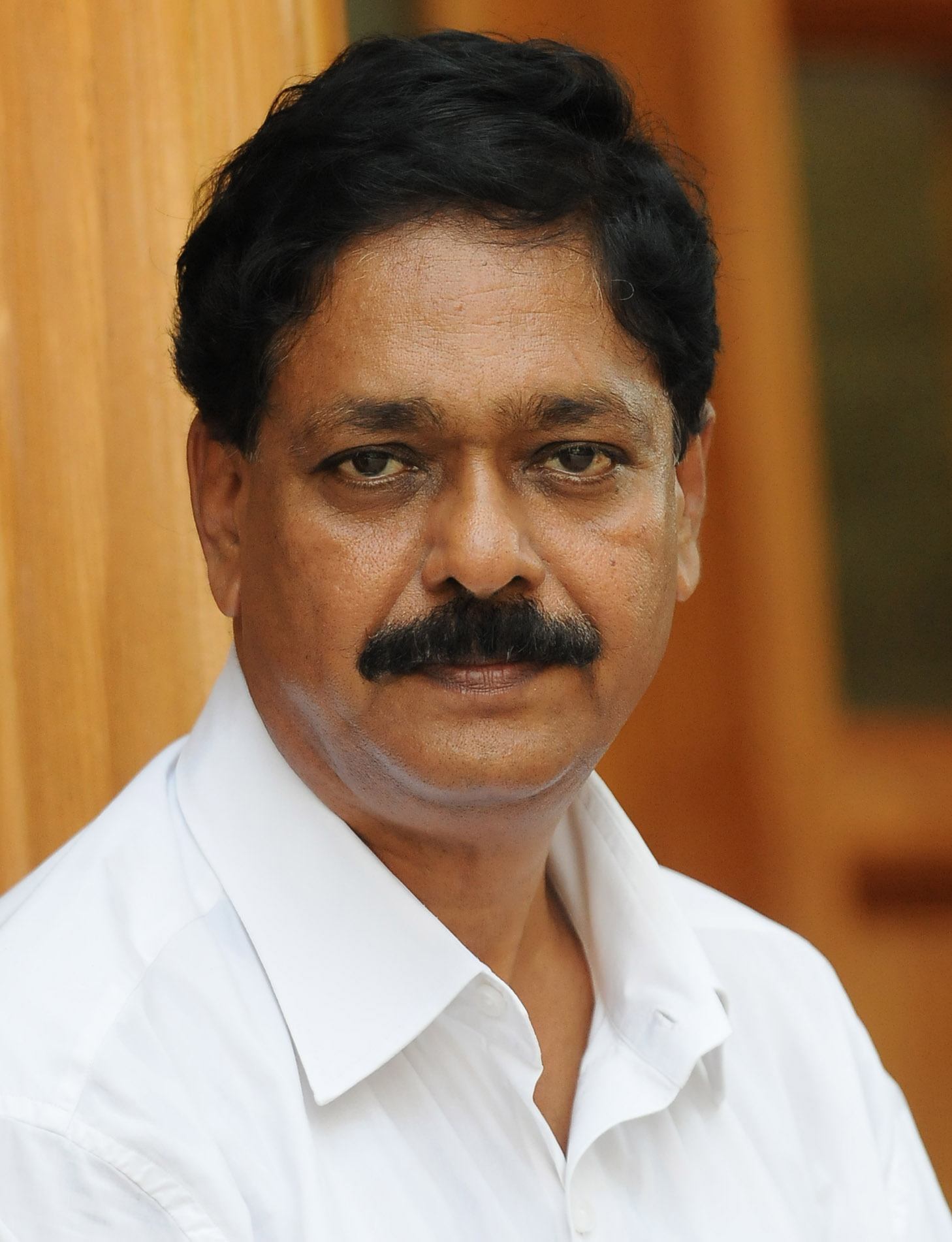
- Born: Vijayawada, Andhra Pradesh, India
- Occupations: Director; Screenwriter
- Spouse: Durga Bhavani
- Children: Nandan Babu, Anand Babu, Pramod Babu, Vinod Babu .

C. Umamaheswara Rao is an Indian film director, screenwriter, aesthetician and producer known for his works predominantly in Telugu cinema. He has also scripted and directed a few television serials for Doordarshan. He has garnered two Nandi Awards, and the National Film Award. He is also Social and Cultural activist. He is born in Vijayawada now the new capital of Andhrapradesh.

== Career ==
His Telugu film Ankuram, first film of its kind on human rights and civil liberties bagged him National Award and AP State's Best Director Award and many Civilian. His Sreekaram, a Telugu film on hazardous trail on in-camera court against woman rape victim by defence lawyers, gained him AP state's Feature film Award. Actually, this film dealt with Kiranjit Ahluwalia's case prior to Aishwarya Ray's film 'Provoked'. To mention some more are much accoladed 'Stree', a documentary on the exploitation faced by Indian woman, very popular TV serials like 'Himabindu', 'Mr. Brahmanandam 'and Telefilms like Hamsafar (Hindi), Manchu Bomma and many more. He had many short and ad films to his credit.

Recently he directed 15 Telefilms on film aesthetics for Ur films that have been successfully telecast in 10 TV. They are being shown in short film festivals for educating the participants.

He is the Chairman of Jury in 4 Short Film festivals and had been the jury member in AP State Awards Committee 2010 and twice Juror in UNESCO Ladli Awards Committee.

The Chairman of the West panel of National Film Awards 2019 and had been in the Central Committee.

Member of the Jury for Oscars in Indian Entry Selections 2020.

Formed Center for New Perspectives in Film and Media, Hyderabad.

He is the Founder / Chairman for Dadasaheb Phalke School of Film and Media, which has an advisory board chaired by Mr. Allu Aravind and members being M/s Vijayendra Prasad, Resool Pookutty, Madhu Ambat, Neelakanta, Sreekar Prasad, Indraganti Mohan Krishna, Paruchuri Bros., etc. as advisors.

Conducted Master Class 0n Screenplay at Indian Panorama Film Festival, Manipur (50 years of Manipur Cinema) on 13–12–2021.

Lectured on "Expressionism and Realism in Films" at Acharya Nagarjuna University's UGC sponsored National Workshop for 3 days 1–3 April 2023 on Cinema and Social Relevance.

Member in Board of Studies for two academic years 2023 and 2024 for Acharya Nagarjuna University at the introduction of courses of M.A.(Cinema), M.A.(T.V) and M.A.(Theatre).

Member of the Script Evaluation Board of National Film Development Corporation for Film Financing for South Indian languages, Hindi and English for the years 2022, 2023 and 2024.

Have been in the jury of Telangana (Government's) Gaddar Film Awards, 2025 for the year 2024.

An Initiator and Patron of a Global event in Telangana 'Hyderabad International Short Film Festival (HISFF) for 3 days 19th, 20th and 21 st December 2025 at Prasad Multiplex 2 screens with a record break entries of 706 from round the world.

== Awards ==
National Film Awards

- Best Feature Film in Telugu (director) - Ankuram (1992)

Nandi Awards

- Best Director - Ankuram (1992)
- Best Feature Film - Sreekaram (1996)

Revathi won her First Film Fare Award in Telugu

K.V.Reddy Award - Best Director - Ankuram (1992)

‘Itlu Amma’ garnered numerous National and International Film Festivals for Direction, Script, Actor

(Revathi) and Production in 2021 and 2022.

== Filmography ==
=== Director ===
Year	Movie Name	Language	Notes
1986	Pula Pallaki	Telugu	
1987	Padandi Munduku	Telugu	
1992	Ankuram	Telugu	
1992	Sindhoora	Malayalam	
1995	Mounam	Telugu	
1996	Maun	Hindi	
1996	Srikaram	Telugu	
1996	Surya Putrulu	Telugu	
2003	Avuna	Telugu	
2021	Itlu Amma	Telugu	released on Sony LIV

=== Documentary ===
Many documentaries to his credit, one of which is

- Sthree (APFDC Award for Best Documentary)

=== Telefilm ===
- Hamsafar (Hindi)
- Manchu Bomma (2011) (Telugu): ETV telefilm.
