= Shiva (1989 Telugu film) =

1989 film directed by Ram Gopal Varma

- Theatrical release poster
- Directed by: Ram Gopal Varma
- Written by: Story & Screenplay: Ram Gopal Varma; Dialogues: Tanikella Bharani
- Produced by: Akkineni Venkat; Yarlagadda Surendra
- Starring: Nagarjuna; Amala; Raghuvaran
- Cinematography: S. Gopala Reddy
- Edited by: Sattibabu
- Music by: Ilaiyaraaja
- Production companies: Annapurna Studios; SS Creations
- Release date: 5 October 1989
- Running time: 145 minutes
- Country: India
- Language: Telugu

Shiva (also spelt Siva) is a 1989 Indian Telugu-language crime action film directed by Ram Gopal Varma in his directoral debut and the film is produced by Akkineni Venkat and Yarlagadda Surendra under Annapurna Studios and SS Creations. The film, which marks the directorial debut of Ram Gopal Varma, explores the concepts of student exploitation by anti-social elements and the impact of crowd psychology.

Varma's script was based on his experiences as a student at Siddhartha Engineering College in Vijayawada. Tanikella Bharani wrote the dialogues. Ilaiyaraaja composed the soundtrack and score, while S. Gopala Reddy was its cinematographer. Thota Tharani and Sattibabu were the art director and editor respectively. The principal photography began on 16 February 1989, and was completed in 55 working days. Except for three days of shooting in Madras (now Chennai), Shiva was filmed in Telangana and Andhra Pradesh.

Shiva was released on 5 October 1989 to critical acclaim, primarily for its technology and sound design. Producers Venkat and Surendra had average expectations before the release due to the film's unconventional approach. Upon release, Shiva exceeded everyone's expectations in the production team and became the highest-grossing film of Telugu cinema and was declared an Industry Hit. It also became the highest-grossing South Indian film during its theatrical run. It was featured in the Indian Panorama mainstream section of the 13th IFFI, held on 19 January 1990.

Shiva attained cult status and is considered Nagarjuna's breakthrough film. It was credited with the introduction of steadicam and new sound recording techniques in Telugu cinema, encouraging filmmakers to explore a variety of themes and make experimental films. For the April 2013 centennial of Indian cinema, News18 included Shiva on its list of 100 greatest Indian films of all time. The Tamil-dubbed version Udhayam was also a major commercial success in Tamil Nadu. Varma remade the film in Hindi with the same name with Nagarjuna and Amala reprising their roles, and it performed well at the box office. A documentary titled Exploring Shiva after 25 Years was released on the film's silver anniversary and it was the first documentary about a Telugu film. In addition to the Filmfare Award for Best Film – Telugu, Shiva won three Nandi Awards: Best Director (Varma), Best First Film of a Director, and Best Dialogue Writer (Bharani).

== Plot ==
Shiva, a quiet college student, moves to Hyderabad to live with his brother Sarath's family and enrolls at the VAS College of Arts and Sciences. While he shares a warm bond with Sarath and his young niece Keerthi, his sister-in-law resents his presence, viewing him as a financial liability. At college, Shiva integrates into a close-knit group of friends and falls in love with a fellow student, Asha, who is the sister of an upright police officer, Inspector Venkat. The campus is politically dominated by J. Durga Rao (alias J.D.), an unopposed, tyrannical student union president who operates with complete impunity. J.D. functions as the lowest enforcer in a sprawling criminal syndicate overseen by the mid-level gangster Ganesh and the ruthless, overarching mafia don Bhavani.

Bhavani leverages his extensive criminal network to provide muscle and financial backing to his political mentor, Machiraju. Although J.D. faces frequent arrests for campus disruptions, Bhavani consistently secures his release, rendering the local police and college administration helpless. The status quo shatters when J.D. harasses Asha on campus, provoking a retaliatory response from Shiva. In a defining confrontation, Shiva physically overpowers J.D. and his associates using a bicycle chain, instantly breaking the regime of terror on campus and earning the enmity of Ganesh. Emboldened by Shiva's defiance, his peers urge him to run for the student union presidency. Desiring a peaceful academic life, Shiva declines and nominates his friend Naresh instead. Recognizing J.D.'s waning influence and Shiva's formidable nature, Bhavani briefly considers recruiting Shiva to replace J.D., but his overtures are ignored.

The conflict escalates when Ganesh and his henchmen brutally assault Naresh to intimidate the student faction. Shiva's aggressive retaliation infuriates Bhavani, destroying any possibility of a truce. While Shiva's friends are traveling out of town to attend a wedding, they are ambushed by Bhavani’s syndicate, resulting in the murder of Malli, one of Shiva's closest companions. Swearing vengeance, Shiva recognizes the immediate danger to his relatives after an assassination attempt targets his niece, Keerthi. He relocates to his friend Chinna's hostel and officially agrees to contest the student union presidential election to systematically dismantle Bhavani's campus pipeline.

Shiva's growing influence expands beyond the college when he exposes how Bhavani exploited a prominent labor union leader, Krishna Reddy. Reddy shifts his allegiance to Shiva, dealing a massive blow to Bhavani’s extortion rackets. In response, Bhavani orchestrates a targeted campaign of violence, murdering several of Shiva's political aides. To safeguard his brother, Shiva arranges for Sarath's employment to be transferred, relocating the family to Warangal. Shiva then launches a counter-offensive against the syndicate's safehouses, culminating in a joint operation with Inspector Venkat that successfully apprehends Ganesh. Realizing Bhavani's operations are collapsing, Machiraju abruptly withdraws his political patronage, viewing Shiva as a more viable and powerful alternative.

Desperate to regain leverage, a humiliated Bhavani discovers Sarath's new location and kidnaps Keerthi. Concurrently, Ganesh turns state witness in court, prompting the judiciary to issue an absolute arrest warrant for Bhavani. Cornered and enraged, Bhavani murders Keerthi. Driven by grief and vengeance, Shiva tracks Bhavani to Machiraju's residence, arriving just after Bhavani has assassinated the politician for his betrayal. A relentless high-speed pursuit ensues, culminating in a brutal, visceral duel on the rooftop of a commercial shopping complex. After sustaining severe injuries from Shiva, Bhavani loses his footing and falls to his death from the building. Inspector Venkat and Asha arrive at the scene to find Bhavani's corpse surrounded by a gathering crowd, while a dismayed and exhausted Shiva silently descends the stairs to meet them.

== Cast ==
- Nagarjuna as Shiva
- Amala as Asha
- Raghuvaran as Bhavani
- Viswanath as Ganesh
- Tanikella Bharani as Nanaji
- Jithendra as Chinna
- Murali Mohan as Sarath
- Kota Srinivasa Rao as Machiraju
- Gollapudi Maruti Rao as Viswanadham
- Sai Chand as Venkat
- Subhalekha Sudhakar as "Malli" Mallick
- Chakravarthy as J. Durga Rao (J. D.)
- Ramjagan as Naresh
- Sushma as Keerthi
- Nirmalamma as Malli's mother
- Brahmaji as Bhavani's henchman
- Uttej as Yadagiri
- Bhanu Prakash as the college principal

== Production ==
=== Development ===
After he graduated with a degree in civil engineering from Siddhartha Engineering College in Vijayawada, Ram Gopal Varma opened a video-rental shop in Ameerpet. Noting his son's interest in films, Penmatsa Krishnamraju (a former sound recordist for Annapurna Studios) helped Varma join the teams of Collector Gari Abbai (1987) and Rao Gari Illu (1988) as an assistant director. Varma befriended actor Nagarjuna, and filmmakers Akkineni Venkat and Yarlagadda Surendra. He presented his script for Raathri to them. But Nagarjuna wasn't interested in doing a horror film and encouraged Varma to come back with an action-oriented story. Varma then presented the script for Shiva, drawing inspiration from his own experiences as a student in Vijayawada.

When Rao Gari Illu was nearly completed, Varma asked co-director Siva Nageswara Rao to join him. He approached Tanikella Bharani to write the dialogues after observing his work in Ladies Tailor (1985) and Sri Kanaka Mahalakshmi Recording Dance Troupe (1987). Bharani found the plot (as described by Varma) similar to those of K. S. R. Das' films. Varma rejected Bharani's comic version, and asked to rewrite it as a crime drama. Although Bharani's usual fee was ₹25,000, he received ₹35,000 for Shiva. Gunasekhar and Teja, who later pursued career as filmmakers, joined the film's crew as assistant directors.

Venkat and Surendra produced Shiva under their banners of Annapurna Studios and SS Creations, respectively. The production began in February 1989. Varma wanted M. M. Keeravani to compose the film's soundtrack and score, since Keeravani had assisted K. Chakravarthy on Rao Gari Illu. As both were inexperienced, Keeravani suggested that Varma choose a more seasoned technician and Ilaiyaraaja was signed instead. S. Gopala Reddy, Thota Tharani and Sattibabu were the film's director of photography, art director and editor, respectively. Gopala Reddy was inspired by Gordon Willis' work in The Godfather (1972).

=== Casting ===
Shiva is Nagarjuna's 17th film as an actor. Varma found him the only actor who could understand his perspective. Nagarjuna and Varma had discussed astronomy and realised that they shared similar sensibilities. That, and Varma's passion for and dedication to films, prompted Nagarjuna to work with him. Amala, who worked with Nagarjuna in Chinababu (1988), was chosen as the female lead. Shiva was the first film in her career where the script was explained shot by shot. When Varma approached Rohini to dub Amala's portions, she agreed to dub for Amala after watching about three reels of footage.

Varma chose Raghuvaran to play the local crime boss, Bhavani. Varma wanted him to underplay the character, which was based on real life. Before accepting the role, Raghuvaran studied the mannerisms and lifestyles of mob leaders and criminals in Mumbai for 20 days. Varma wanted to name the characters played by Nagarjuna and Raghuvaran as Bhavani and Siva respectively. At Nagarjuna's request, he reversed the names. Varma chose newcomers Chakravarthy, Jithendra, and Ramjagan to play J. D., Chinna, and Naresh after auditioning them at Annapurna Studios. Uttej, one of Varma's assistant directors, played a comic role of a server in the college canteen. He recommended Varma to cast Sushma for Keerthi's role.

P. Sai Kumar was initially supposed to play J. D., but the role went to Chakravarthy. Varma met the latter on the film's sets and asked him to perform a scene of his choice. Despite an unsuccessful screen test, Varma selected Chakravarthy after a meeting on the next day after observing the depth in his expression. Seasoned actors such as Murali Mohan, Gollapudi Maruti Rao, Kota Srinivasa Rao, Subhalekha Sudhakar, and Saichand played supporting roles. Bharani agreed to play Bhavani's assistant, Nanaji, at Varma's insistence. Producer Akkineni Venkat made a cameo appearance as one of Bhavani's clients, and Siva Nageswara Rao dubbed his portion. Brahmaji was cast as Bhavani's henchman.

=== Filming ===
RGV's ingenuity lies in his understanding of human nature, and I got a first-hand experience while filming the scene where I betray Gollapudi Maruthi Rao. Before shooting that scene, RGV told me that I should feel guilty for betraying my boss because every person, however cruel might be, has a humane side. So, all I did was gulp, and RGV was impressed with my expression.

— Brahmaji about his experience with Varma during filming

Varma read about steadicam in American Cinematographer, and enquired about the possibility of a similar camera in India. After learning that steadicam was available in Chennai for four years and was already obsolete, Varma decided to use it despite Gopala Reddy's apprehension. Varma chose Rasool Ellore over Rajiv Menon and Deenpal to assist Gopala Reddy with the steadicam. Principal photography began on 16 February 1989, and wrapped in 55 working days. Except for three days in Chennai, the film was shot in Telangana and Andhra Pradesh.

The scenes of the protagonist's college life were filmed at Keyes High school, near Secunderabad Junction railway station. A school wall was demolished, and a gate was repaired for the film's opening scene. Raghuvaran was carried away during the shoot of few action sequences and slapped Brahmaji for nearly six times in a row. To avoid such issues in the case of murder scenes, Varma decided to complete a few of them by using plain close-ups of the victims.

Sudhakar's murder scene was filmed near Keesara in Ranga Reddy district. Gopala Reddy and Ellore placed a camera in a bag and ran behind him for a shaky effect. The original cycle chain used by Nagarjuna in the iconic cycle chain fight sequence is still intact with JD Chakravarthy. He mentioned this during the 25th anniversary celebrations of Shiva, saying he was able to preserve the cycle chain by cleaning it regularly. The scene in which Naresh is killed near his home was filmed in the streets of Vengala Rao Nagar. The cycle chase scenes were filmed in Somajiguda and the slums behind Yashoda Hospitals. The bus chase scene was shot in Yusufguda. The climax fight between Nagarjuna and Raghuvaran has been shot on the terrace of the Swapnalok Complex in Secunderabad,

The iconic song "Anando Brahma" was filmed at the Borra Caves in Visakhapatnam. The film crew had to crawl into the caves, making Shiva the first Telugu film shot in its interiors. The remaining songs were filmed on sets at Annapurna Studios. Srinivasa Rao filmed his scenes in one day. The fights, choreographed by Varma, featured hand-to-hand combat and attacks with hooks as he was trained in kickboxing.

== Themes and influences ==
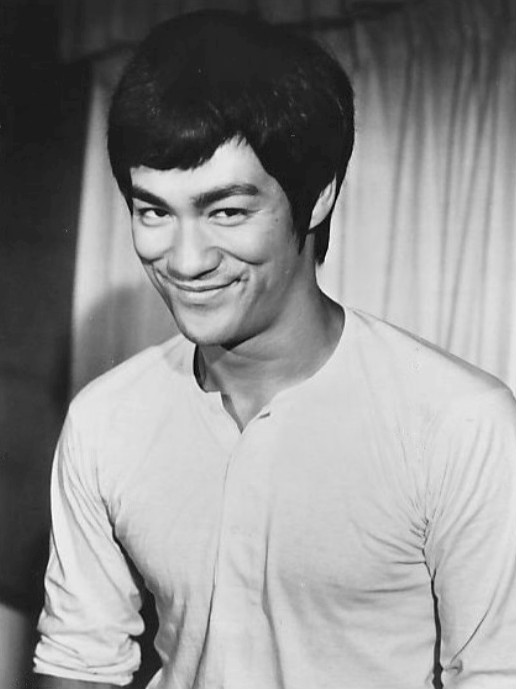
Shiva's plot was adapted from The Way of the Dragon (1972), produced and directed by and starring Bruce Lee.

Shiva explores the exploitation of students by anti-social elements against a mafia backdrop and the impact on them of crowd psychology. It also focuses on politics and betrayal in the scene where Bhavani murders Machiraju and his enemy Viswanadham. As a student, Varma observed and participated in gang wars and student politics besides analysing the impact of a gangster's lifestyle and body language on students. Those experiences inspired him to begin writing Shiva.

Most of the characters, including Bhavani, were inspired by real life. Bhavani was based on Radha, an actual crime boss with a reputation for violence in Vijayawada; Bhavani, like Radha, is also a woman's name. Shiva's character was comparatively fictitious whom Varma considered an "ideal person" making the society "too dramatic". Shiva was partially based on Varma's friend, Golla Ravi, who lived in Punjagutta. Director S.S Rajamouli said that he learned how to create build-up in scenes after watching Shiva, he said the fight sequences in the film created a strong impact, and lauded Ram Gopal Varma for introducing new-age sound designing to Telugu cinema. Rajamouli also noted that Shiva inspired hundreds and thousands of assistant directors. Director V.V. Vinayak said that the impact of Shiva is so big that movies can be divided as before and after Shiva. Vinayak further said Shiva is a great inspiration to many, not just in Telugu, but also in Tamil, as he remembered how assistant directors in Tamil Nadu got inspired by Shiva's Tamil dubbed version Udhayam when it was released during his stint as an assistant director in Chennai.

The basic plot of The Way of the Dragon (1972) was adapted by Varma for Shiva. In The Way of the Dragon, Tang Lung (Bruce Lee) comes from Hong Kong to work in a Chinese restaurant in Rome and fights local gangsters who try to intimidate the owners; this leads to a rivalry with a crime boss (Chuck Norris). In Shiva, Nagarjuna comes from a nearby town to Hyderabad to further his education, fights gangsters and develops a rivalry with Raghuvaran. While Lee and Norris fight at the Colosseum at the climax of The Way of the Dragon, Nagarjuna and Raghuvaran duel on a building terrace in Shiva.

In addition to The Way of the Dragon, Varma adapted scenes from a number of other films. Malli's mother slapping a police inspector for failing to save him was inspired by Steven Spielberg's Jaws (1975), and the cycle chase scene was based on a similar scene in Arjun. A scene in which goons demand donations to build a temple for Ganesha was from Kaal Chakra. Although Varma wanted to film a fight between Nagarjuna and Chakravarthy during a football match (based on a similar scene in 1978's Damien: Omen II), Venkat was indifferent to the idea.

== Music ==
Shiva's five-song soundtrack album and background score were composed by Ilaiyaraaja, with Veturi Sundararama Murthy writing the lyrics of "Anando Brahma", "Enniyallo", and "Kiss Me Hello". Sirivennela Seetharama Sastry wrote the lyrics for the remaining two songs: "Botany" and "Sarasalu". S. P. Balasubrahmanyam, S. Janaki, K. S. Chithra, and Mano were the singers. The soundtrack—in the only collaboration between Varma and Ilaiyaraaja—was successful upon release.

== Release ==
Shiva was produced on a budget of ₹75 lakh. Venkat and Surendra retained the distribution rights for Nizam, (Note: For film trade purposes, the Nizam region includes the three districts of Kalaburagi, Bidar, and Raichur in Karnataka and seven districts in the Marathwada region including Aurangabad, Latur, Nanded, Parbhani, Beed, Jalna and Osmanabad apart from the state of Telangana.) Vishakhapatnam and the East and West Godavari regions. The film was released on 5 October 1989, It was featured in the Indian Panorama mainstream section of the 13th International Film Festival of India, held on 19 January 1990 at the Empire Theatre in Kolkata. After Shiva's massive commercial success in Telugu, producers Venkat and Surendra decided to dub the film into Tamil as Udhayam. It was released on 12 January 1990 in 24 centres. The Hindi remake Shiva was released on 7 December 1990

== Reception ==
Shiva received praise for its usage of technology and sound design. Although producers Venkat and Surendra had average expectations before the release due to the film's unconventional approach, Shiva went on to become the highest-grossing film of Telugu Cinema. It set many box office records like earning ₹1 crore in the Nizam region alone (a first in Telugu cinema). In addition to ₹50,000, Varma received five percent of Shiva's profits. The film had a 100-day run in 22 centres and a 175-day run in five centres in Andhra and Telangana. The Tamil dubbed version Udhayam had a 100-day run in more than 10 centres, and silver jubilee run in more than 5 centres, thereby earning a theatrical share of more than ₹2 crore in Tamil Nadu. The Hindi remake Shiva was also a huge commercial success. During Shiva's 25 years celebrations, Ram Gopal Varma remembered a lighthearted moment with the late ANR, Varma said "Akkineni Nageswara Rao Sir advised me to place an advertisement thanking the audience for making my first film successful, to which I replied, the audience should thank me, why should I thank them?". Nagarjuna, along with director Ram Gopal Varma, announced the re-release of Shiva in a special enhanced 4K and Dolby Atmos format on 8 August 2025, to celebrate the 50th anniversary of Annapurna Studios, and that the re-release date will be revealed soon. On 20 September 2025, Nagarjuna confirmed that Shiva is all set for a grand re-release on 14 November 2025 For the April 2013 centennial of Indian cinema, News18 included Shiva on its list of 100 greatest Indian films of all time, calling it a "completely new take on student politics and the ideologies driving it" and saying that the film's ideas "found a reflection in many university elections during a later stage".

== Awards ==
Award (Note: Awards, festivals and organizations are in Alphabetical order.)	Date of ceremony (Note: Date is linked to the article about the awards held that year, wherever possible.)	Category	Recipient(s)	Result	Ref.
Filmfare Awards South	12 August 1990	Best Film – Telugu	Shiva	Won	
Nandi Awards	2 May 1990	Best Director	Ram Gopal Varma	Won	
Nandi Awards	2 May 1990	Best First Film of a Director	Ram Gopal Varma	Won	
Nandi Awards	2 May 1990	Best Dialogue Writer	Tanikella Bharani	Won	

== Remakes ==
Shiva was remade by Varma in Hindi under the same title in 1990, and was Nagarjuna's acting debut in Hindi cinema. It was the last Hindi film with Amala in a lead role. Minor changes were made to the remake's cast and crew. All the songs in the Telugu version were used unchanged except for "Botany", which was reshot at Acharya N. G. Ranga Agricultural University in Rajendranagar. Telugu filmmaker Puri Jagannadh was cast as one of Nagarjuna's friends in the remake. Jagannadh wanted to assist Varma and approached him for an opportunity. Varma insisted Jagannadh to act and he obliged, feeling that this experience would teach him something. Produced in association with Atluri Purnachandra Rao on a budget of ₹1.15 crore, Shiva was released on 7 December 1990. The Hindi remake resonated with audiences, enjoying substantial commercial success. Nagarjuna has ruled over Bollywood with Shiva's huge commercial success in Hindi.

== Sequel ==
In September 2020 Nagarjuna said that a sequel to Shiva would be a viable alternative to a digitised version, and proposed a film about Shiva, Asha, and their two sons. Advising Varma to develop a script, he asked the director to cast Amala, Naga Chaitanya and Akhil Akkineni. The sequel would reportedly be produced by Annapurna Studios.

== Aftermath ==
=== Digitisation ===
In September 2014, Shiva was digitally remastered for theatrical release. Supriya Yarlagadda of Annapurna Studios said that the decision to remaster and digitise was made after observing the challenges in storing and preserving old film prints. The process (carried out in Mumbai) took a year, and the film's colour and sound quality were enhanced to meet current standards. A silver jubilee event was held on 7 October 2014 in Hyderabad, where Nagarjuna announced that Shiva's digitised version would be released on 17 October 2014 on nearly 100 screens. In April 2015, Varma told Indo-Asian News Service that the digitised release was postponed until 15 May because of restoration delays.

=== Documentary ===
During the digitisation of Shiva, Varma said that he would release a documentary on the making of the film entitled Exploring Shiva after 25 Years. The first documentary based on a Telugu film, it provided a "holistic view of the film" and featured interviews with the cast and crew and segments on its sound and filming locations. The documentary was released on 5 October 2014, coinciding with Shiva's silver anniversary.

== Legacy ==
=== Influence on film personalities ===
I still recall Varma okaying my first shot, though I forgot to utter my line. He was of the opinion that I conveyed what I needed to, through a gesture. Post the shot, he came to me and said that it’s better I forget putting pen to paper, only for me to realise later that I would become a busy actor.

— Bharani during the film's silver jubilee.

Shiva, which is a cult classic of Indian cinema, was one of the first Telugu films produced after the migration of Telugu film industry from Madras to Hyderabad, and is recognized as one of the first major mainstream films to feature characters speaking the Telangana dialect. The film made Nagarjuna a superstar across India, it changed his career and earned him a reputation for encouraging new directors.

Shiva (1989) has been cited as an influential film in Telugu Cinema, particularly for its approach to action choreography, sound design and filmmaking techniques. Several directors like SS Rajamouli, Puri Jagannadh, Sandeep Reddy Vanga, Ashutosh Gowariker, V.V. Vinayak, Sekhar Kammula, Anurag Kashyap, Madhur Bhandarkar, Sriram Raghavan, have identified the film as an influence. Its impact and continued recognition have been discussed in retrospective commentary on Indian cinema.

Ashutosh Gowariker said Shiva had a "punch in the gut" impact that left a lasting impression and noted that the film was filled with an electrifying energy. He was particularly mesmerized by the opening and the famous bicycle chain scene, and he found actor Nagarjuna's performance magnetic. Gowariker noted that the film made him curious about how Varma created such a powerful screen presence.

Many filmmakers and writers like V. V. Vinayak and Pulagam Chinnarayana have credited Shiva for raising the bar of Telugu Cinema as before and after Shiva. With Shiva, Varma was credited with the introduction of steadicams and new sound recording techniques in Indian Cinema. Within a year of the film's release, more than ten steadicams were imported into India. Shiva attracted audience from all age groups during its theatrical run, and its success encouraged filmmakers to explore a variety of themes and make experimental films.

Mani Ratnam has praised the film, calling it an "amazing first film" for director Ram Gopal Varma. He highlighted Varma's command over the craft and mastery of cinema's language, noting a particular envy for the director's "economy of shots". Ratnam's comments were part of the film's re-release celebrations, highlighting its groundbreaking nature.

Bharani broke through as an actor and dialogue writer with the film. Chakravarthy, Jithendra and Ramjagan achieved success with Shiva, and the former two adapted J. D. and Chinna as screen names. Kannada actor and filmmaker Upendra reworked the narrative of Om (1995) when he found the previous version similar to Shiva. Telugu filmmaker S. S. Rajamouli understood the importance of heightening tension in action sequences, and the impact created by proper use of sound after watching Shiva. Srinu Vaitla, Sudheer Varma, and Praveen Sri were inspired by Shiva to pursue careers as directors; Sri assisted Ram Gopal Varma before he made his directorial debut with Gaayam 2 (2010). Music director Munna Kasi was inspired by Ilaiyaraaja's work in Shiva, and wanted to work with Varma after he graduated. On the rise of antisocial-element-based scripts in Tamil cinema, trade analyst Sreedhar Pillai said in May 2002 that Shiva's Tamil-dubbed version (Udhayam) was the "forerunner" of city-based crime films.

Tamil actor Ganesh Venkatraman was "mesmerised" as a child by Shiva, admiring Nagarjuna and carrying a cycle chain in his schoolbag. About the impact of Baahubali: The Beginning (2015) on Indian cinema, Rana Daggubati said that regional films can gain national acceptance for their content and cited the success of Shiva and Roja (1992) as examples. In March 2016, Karthi said that he admired Nagarjuna after seeing Udhayam its Tamil dubbed version and Idhayathai Thirudathe (1989) and found working with him in Oopiri (2016) "a great chance to know him."

=== In popular culture ===
The cycle-chain scene became popular, with people telling Varma that they broke a cycle chain after seeing Shiva; the director called them the "ultimate example of how imagination can take over and become a reality in time". As of 2014, the chain used in the film is owned by Chakravarthy. Shiva was originally the name of the villain of the movie. But after the narration, Nagarjuna liked the name so much that he requested his role to be named Shiva. Film-poster designers Anil and Bhanu said that posters should be designed to make a subconscious impact on the viewer, citing the title logo of Shiva (with Nagarjuna and the cycle chain) as an example. Inspired by Varma's work in Shiva, Rajamouli composed the action sequence during the intermission of his directorial debut Student No. 1 (2001), and followed the shot division of the cycle-chain scene for the same.

During the production of James (2005), Varma thought of doing something like Shiva, he wanted to portray the underworld and police as he thought it would be interesting to structure a story around the Mumbai police. Varma then made Shiva 2006, with Mohit Ahlawat and Priyanka Kothari. If the original was set amid a campus backdrop, the 2006 version shows the protagonist as an honest cop fighting the corrupt system and the Mumbai underworld. Shiva 2006 failed to impress the audience and critics. Sukanya Verma of Rediff.com wrote that "the film dares to ridiculously rest on the incapable shoulders of a non-acting cast -- Mohit Ahlawat and Nisha Kothari, and also noted that Shiva 2006 has nothing in common with the original Nagarjuna starrer.

Chakravarthy agreed to play the antagonist in Naga Chaitanya's acting debut, Josh (2009), and said that its makers are "trying to get JD of Shiva who actually ran away mid way from college". Bangalore Mirror and other reviewers noted similarities between Josh and Shiva, which Chaitanya called a "coincidence". Chaitanya's films, Bezawada (2011)—produced by Varma—and Autonagar Surya (2014), were noted for similarities to Shiva. Shiva was parodied in several films such as Lakshmi (2006), Oosaravelli (2011), Katha Screenplay Darsakatvam Appalaraju (2011) (also directed by Varma), and Sudigadu (2012).

Amala listed Shiva with Pushpaka Vimana (1987), Vedham Pudhithu (1987), Agni Natchathiram (1988), and Karpoora Mullai (1991) as her most memorable films. Geethika Chandrahasan Sudip of The Hindu listed Shiva for the letter S in the July 2015 "ABCD of Telugu cinema". In August 2015, Pooja Darade of The Times of India included the film on her list of "Telugu movies one must watch before dying".

== Bibliography ==
- Chinnarayana, Pulagam (August 2007). శివ—సెల్యులాయిడ్ చరిత్రలో సహజావేశం [Siva—A natural frustration in the history of celluloid] (in Telugu). United States. ISSN 1559-7008. Archived from the original on 31 May 2016.
- Varma, Ram Gopal (18 December 2015). Guns and Thighs: The Story of My Life. Rupa Publications. ISBN 978-81-2913-749-4. Archived from the original on 16 May 2016.
