= Allari Alludu =

- Theatrical release poster
- Directed by: A. Kodandarami Reddy
- Written by: Thotapalli Madhu (story / dialogues)
- Screenplay by: A. Kodandarami Reddy
- Produced by: D. Sivaprasad Reddy
- Starring: Nagarjuna; Meena; Nagma; Vanisri
- Cinematography: Rasool Ellore
- Edited by: A. Sreekar Prasad
- Music by: M. M. Keeravani
- Production company: Kamakshi Art Movies
- Release date: 6 October 1993
- Running time: 158 minutes
- Country: India
- Language: Telugu

Allari Alludu (transl. Naughty Son-In-Law) is a 1993 Telugu-language comedy drama film directed by A. Kodandarami Reddy. It stars Nagarjuna, Meena, Nagma, Vanisri and music composed by M. M. Keeravani. The film was a success at the box office. The film was dubbed and released in Tamil as Galatta Maappillai and in Malayalam as Hey Madam. The film was remade in Kannada as Gadibidi Aliya (1995).

== Cast ==
- Nagarjuna as Kalyan and Rajesh (Dual role)
- Meena as Sandhya (Voice Dubbed by Roja Ramani)
- Nagma as Sravani (Voice Dubbed by Saritha)
- Rao Gopala Rao
- Vanisri as Akhilandeswari
- Murali Mohan
- Sangeetha
- Kota Srinivasa Rao
- Chalapathi Rao
- Rakhee
- Brahmanandam
- Babu Mohan
- Rallapalli
- Suthi Velu
- Gundu Hanumantha Rao
- K. K. Sharma as Principal
- Chitti Babu
- Chidatala Appa Rao
- Visweswara Rao
- Ramya Krishna as item number "Ninu Road Meeda"

== Soundtrack ==
Allari Alludu

Film score by M. M. Keeravani
- Released: 1993
- Genre: Soundtrack
- Length: 34:05
- Label: Surya Audio
- Producer: M. M. Keeravani

M. M. Keeravani chronology
Rakshana (1993)	Allari Alludu (1993)	Varasudu (1993)

The music was composed by M. M. Keeravani. Music released on SURYA Audio. The song "Ninnu Road Meeda" was remixed again by Keeravani for the film Savyasachi (2018).

No.	Title	Lyrics	Singer(s)	Length
1.	"Raika Chusthe"	Veturi	S. P. Balasubrahmanyam, Chitra	4:45
2.	"Kammani Vodi Bommani"	Veturi	S. P. Balasubrahmanyam, Chitra	5:05
3.	"Machalipatnam Mayabazaar"	Veturi	S. P. Balasubrahmanyam, Chitra, B. Ramana	4:51
4.	"Ninu Road Meeda"	Veturi	S. P. Balasubrahmanyam, Chitra	4:44
5.	"Okkasare Once More"	Veturi	S. P. Balasubrahmanyam, Chitra	5:18
6.	"Thoda Thokkidi"	Veturi	S. P. Balasubrahmanyam, Chitra	5:08
7.	"Chalo Na Chekkara Kheli"	Veturi	S. P. Balasubrahmanyam, Chitra	4:14
Total length:				34:05

== Reception ==
In a retrospective review, a critic from iQlik Movies wrote, "Allari Alludu is one tremendous entertainer which established Nagarjuna as a hero with genuine mass appeal. His brilliant acting with veteran actress Vanisri and great comedy made the film one of the blockbusters in the year of its release". The critic also praised the performances and work of the cast and crew.
