= Ganga (2006 film) =

2006 Indian film directed by Abhishek Chhadha

- Directed by: Abhishek Chhadha
- Produced by: Deepak Sawant
- Starring: Amitabh Bachchan; Hema Malini; Nagma; Ravi Kishan; Manoj Tiwari
- Music by: Ashok Ghayal
- Release date: 20 October 2006
- Country: India
- Language: Bhojpuri

Ganga is a 2006 Indian Bhojpuri-language film directed by Abhishek Chhadha. The film proved to be a turning point for the Bhojpuri film industry due the casting of Amitabh Bachchan and Hema Malini.

== Plot ==
Ganga, a bright and educated young woman, resides in a modest village in India with her parents. Shankar comes to Ganga's aid during a troubling incident but during the act he sustains a temporary injury and becomes cripple. Later, Ganga, amid her daily prayers by the river chastises Ranjit, the affluent son of Thakur Vijay Singh, which leads to an arranged marriage proposal from Thakur Vijay Singh. Despite her agreement to marry Ranjit, he accuses her of infidelity on their wedding day. With Shankar's intervention again, the truth is uncovered, prompting Ganga to wed Shankar instead. However, tensions escalate in their new household with Shankar's unsupportive sister-in-law, and vengeful Ranjit, leading to challenges for Ganga and Shankar.

== Cast ==
- Amitabh Bachchan as Thakur Vijay Singh
- Hema Malini as Savitri
- Nagma as Ganga
- Ravi Kishan as Shankar
- Ajai Sharma as Ranjit
- Manoj Tiwari as Bajrangi

== Production ==
Amitabh Bachchan and Hema Malini, who previously co-starred in Baghban (2003), co-star in this film, which was shot at Film City, Mumbai.

== Accolades ==
Producer Deepak Sawant won the award for Best Film and Nagma won the award for Best Actress, respectively, at the Second Bhojpuri Film Awards in 2007.

== See also ==
- Bhojpuri cinema
- List of Bhojpuri films
