= Avuna =

Avuna..
- Film poster
- Directed by: C. Umamaheswara Rao
- Dialogue by: Aasam Srinivas
- Screenplay by: C. Umamaheswara Rao
- Story by: C. Umamaheswara Rao
- Produced by: Dr. K. Ramana Kumar
- Starring: Adarsh; Santhi Rao
- Cinematography: Madhu Ambat
- Music by: Bhavatharini Ilayaraaja
- Production company: Meghana Productions
- Release date: 12 December 2003
- Country: India
- Language: Telugu

Avuna.. (transl. Really..?) is a 2003 Indian Telugu-language romantic sports drama film directed by C. Umamaheswara Rao and starring newcomers Adarsh and Santhi Rao. The film was released to negative reviews.

== Cast ==
- Adarsh as Srinivas
- Santhi Rao as Akhila
- Surya as Srinivas's basketball coach
- Vijaya Bhaskar
- Kota Srinivasa Rao
- Brahmanandam
- M. S. Narayana
- Dharmavarapu Subramanyam
- AVS
- Sana
- Apoorva
- Sudeepa Pinky
- Anil Kumar
- Abhijit
- Dinesh
- Anandaraj
- Sriraj
- Sishanthkumar
- Vikas
- Ajay Raj
- Rajababu
- K. Bhagyaraj (special appearance)
- Bhagyashree (special appearance)

== Production ==
Adarsh, Vijaya Bhaskar and Surya were trained in basketball for the film. The climax features national level basketball players. K. Bhagyaraj made his acting debut in Telugu through this film.

== Soundtrack ==
The music was composed by Bhavatharini Ilayaraaja. The lyrics were written by Sirivennela Seetharama Sastry, Bhuvana Chandra, and Chandrabose.

== Reception ==
Jeevi of Idlebrain.com rated the film one out of five and wrote that "Except for a few inspirational quotes uttered in a couple of scenes by Surya, the entire film is a boring one". Mithun Verma of Full Hyderabad rated the film one out of ten and wrote that "The lead pair, as mentioned earlier, appears to have been wearing too tight pants for their liking. The other departments like music, script, comedy, direction etc. are visible very clearly in the credits. That's all the appearance they do".
