= Villadhi Villain =

- Poster
- Directed by: Sathyaraj
- Written by: Sathyaraj
- Produced by: Ramanathan
- Starring: Sathyaraj; Nagma; Radhika
- Cinematography: Jayanan Vincent
- Edited by: P. Sai Suresh
- Music by: Vidyasagar
- Production company: Raaj Films International
- Release date: 23 June 1995
- Country: India
- Language: Tamil

Villadhi Villain (transl. The Ultimate Villain) is a 1995 Indian Tamil-language action comedy film, written and directed by Sathyaraj, starring himself in three distinct roles. Nagma and Radhika play his love interests. The film remains Sathyaraj's first and only directorial venture. The film, which was also his 125th starrer, took a mammoth opening at the box office.

== Plot ==
Meenatchi Sundara Sasthiriyaar is a successful, cunning Brahmin lawyer, who has never lost any case. He is known for his sheer intelligence in the court, and he is very brutal in nature, having excessive feelings for his caste. He is married to Parvathi, whom he always calls as Bombai. They have a beautiful daughter named Janaki.

Edison, a man who comes from the area of Ambetkar, is a road roller driver and local who trains fighting for his locals, living with his poor and affectionate people at the slum. He is a staunch atheist and is like the leader of his group. He has trouble with the minister of that area whose name is Amsavalli. When his area is affected by a storm, he, along with his group, goes to the minister for help, but the minister badly abuses and insults their group. He and his friend Mani both get into a verbal exchange with the minister, leave the place and rebuild their huts. Angered by this, the minister orders her henchmen to beat up Edison and set the huts on fire, and the huts get burnt. As Edison reaches his anger point, he rides a bulldozer and demolishes the minister's house. Also mysteriously, she is killed, but the blame falls on Edison for driving the bulldozer on her and killing her.

In the meanwhile, previously Edison has saved both Parvathi and her daughter Janaki. Due to this, Janaki falls in love with Edison and Parvathi has a good regard for him. Upon seeing Edison's current situation, Parvathi asks her husband to be the lawyer for Edison and save him from the death sentence. Meenatchi Sundara Sasthiriyaar agrees to this. What happens next forms the rest of the story and the rest of the movie.

== Cast ==
- Sathyaraj as Edison/Meenatchi Sundara Sasthiriyaar/Poo (Kannan)
- Radhika as Parvathi (Bombai Mami)
- Nagma as Janaki
- Goundamani as Mani
- Vichithra as Minister Amsavalli
- Manivannan as Minister Kuppusamy
- R. Sundarrajan
- Silk Smitha
- Mayilsamy
- Bobby Bedi as local area bully
- Halwa Vasu

== Soundtrack ==
The music and background score was composed by Vidyasagar, with lyrics by Vairamuthu.

Song	Singers	Length
"Madisara Kattindu"	Unni Menon, Sujatha	5:19
"Purappadu Thamizha"	S. P. Balasubrahmanyam, Malaysia Vasudevan	4:26
"Sarakku Sarakku"	Arunmozhi, S. P. Sailaja, Suresh Peters	4:35
"Theemthalakadi"	Mano, Swarnalatha	5:04
"Vaimaiye Vellum"	Deepak, Anuradha Sriram	4:30
"Vayaso Pathikichu"	Mano, Swarnalatha	4:57

== Reception ==
RPR of Kalki criticised the film for favouring box-office ingredients like action, comedy and songs over story. K. Viijyan of New Straits Times reviewed the film more positively, despite noting the film being affected by censorship by the Film Censorship Board of Malaysia.

== Impact ==
The film was a blockbuster hit upon release. It gained popularity for the explicit glamour scenes played by Nagma and the song "Vayaso Pathikichu" was a famous chartbuster at that time.
