= Nandi Awards of 1989 =

Indian Telugu film and TV awards ceremony

Nandi Awards presented annually by Government of Andhra Pradesh. First awarded in 1964.

== 1989 Nandi Awards Winners List ==
Category	Winner	Film
Best Feature Film	Mani Ratnam	Geethanjali (1989 film)
Second Best Feature Film	A.Mohan Gandhi	Mouna Poratam
Third Best Feature Film	K. Viswanath	Sutradharulu
