= Jaladi Raja Rao =

Indian writer (1932–2011)

- Born: 9 August 1932; Gudiwada, Krishna district
- Died: 14 October 2011 (aged 79); Visakhapatnam
- Occupations: Lyricist, poet, scriptwriter

Jaladi Raja Rao (9 August 1932 – 14 October 2011) was a writer, and lyricist in Telugu cinema.

== Life ==
Jaladi was born on 9 August 1932 in Gudiwada in the Krishna district of Andhra Pradesh. He was the fourth son of Amrutamma and the late Jaladi Emmanuel, a member of the Krishna District Board and Indian freedom fighter.

He passed his S.S.L.C. with Telugu as special course. He started his career as a drawing teacher in District Board Schools. He worked in various districts and learned the slang used in different areas of the State. He resigned his job during his stint at Veeraghattam in Srikakulam district in 1968 and went to Chennai to try his luck in films.

He entered the realm of films as a lyricist for the movie Palle Sema in 1976. His debut song Churattakku Jarutadhi Situkku Situkku is tuned by K V Mahadevan. He wrote several social, philosophical, patriotic and folk songs in Telugu movies. His songs consist of only Telugu words of various regions of Andhra Pradesh.

Being born in a poor family, he always liked to write about poverty, village life and folk type of songs. He penned nearly 1,500 songs in more than 270 movies and remained popular for his folk-oriented songs, which had an exotic rural touch.

He also wrote books like Viswamohini and Kakulamma and plays like Amarajeevi, Tandri, Samadhi and Karumeghalu. He died on 14 October 2011 in Visakhapatnam.

== Awards and achievements ==
- Best writer award from the Vijayawada Cultural Association for his play 'Karu Meghalu' in 1957.
- Conferred Twin Cities Cultural Award and the Hyderabad Film Fare Award in 1970.
- Conferred The Kalasagar Award, Madras in 1987.
- Conferred The Cine Herald Award, Hyderabad in 1987.
- Nandi Award of the Government of Andhra Pradesh in 1990 for Erra Mandaram.
- Was given the title 'Navarasa Kavi Samrat' by the Prabhu Chitra Arts Association of Eluru in 1991.
- Was given the title 'Kalasagar' for the song 'Punya bhoomi naa desam namonamami' in the film Major Chandrakanth.
- Served as a member of the AP Film and TV (Nandi) Awards Committee for 1990–91 and 1994–95.
- Became member of the Executive Council of Sri Potti Sreeramulu Telugu University, Hyderabad, in 1997.
- Honored with Kala Prapoorna award from Andhra University, 2008.

== Filmography ==
These are some of the popular songs penned by him for Telugu films.

Year	Film	Songs
1976	Palle Seema	"Churattuku Jaratadhi Situkku Situkku"
1976	Devude Gelichadu	"Ee kalam Padi Kalalu Bratakalani"
1978	Chal Mohan Ranga	"Gallu Galluna Kali Gajjelu"
1978	Chesedi Patnavasam	"Chesedi Pattanavasam Mesedhi Pallela Grasam"
1978	Pranam Khareedu	"Yethamesi Thodina Yeru Endadhu"
1979	Kotala Rayudu	"Oka Nelavanka Chiru Goruvanka"
1979	Thoorpu Velle Railu	"Sandepoddu andaalunna chinnadi"
1980	Dharma Chakram	"Gogula Pooche Gattu Meedha"
1981	vaaraalabbaayi	"kaakamma kaaki"
1982	Gruha Pravesam	"Abhinava Sasirekhavo"
1986	Repati Pourulu	"Matrudevobhava Tallulara Tandrulara"
1987	Chaitanya Ratham	"Rama Rajyama"
1987	Chaitanya Ratham	"Vijayabheri Velugutundi"
1990	Alludu Garu	"Konda Meeda Chukka Potu"
1992	Brahma	"Musi Musi Nuvvulalona"
1992	Chittemma Mogudu	"Nindu Kundala neelosukuntaadi"
1993	Bobbili Simham	"Srirasthu Subhamastu"
1993	O Tandri O Koduku	"Konda Meedha Poddhu Podupu"
1994	Major Chandrakanth	"Sukhibhava Sukhibhava"
1994	Major Chandrakanth	"Punyabhumi Na Desam Namo Namami"
1995	Errodu	"Raja Nimmala Pandu"
2001	Subbu	"I Love My India"
