= Kedi (2010 film) =

2010 film directed by Kiran Kumar

- Movie Poster
- Directed by: Kiran Kumar
- Written by: Kiran Kumar
- Produced by: D. Siva Prasad Reddy
- Starring: Nagarjuna; Mamta Mohandas
- Cinematography: Sarvesh Murari
- Edited by: Shravan Katikaneni
- Music by: Sandeep Chowtha
- Production companies: Annapurna Studios; Kamakshi Movies
- Release date: 12 February 2010
- Running time: 163 mins
- Country: India
- Language: Telugu

Kedi (transl. Conman) is a 2010 Indian Telugu-language action comedy film written and directed by Kiran Kumar. It was produced by D. Sivaprasad Reddy, under Kamakshi Movies. It starred Nagarjuna Akkineni and Mamta Mohandas, with Ankur Vikal in a supporting role. The music score was composed by Sandeep Chowtha, his fourth collaboration with Nagarjuna after Ninne Pelladutha (1996), Chandralekha (1998), and Super (2005).

It was released on 12 February 2010. It was also dubbed in Tamil as Singa Vettai and in Hindi as Gambler No 1.

== Plot ==
Ramesh, nickname Rummy (Nagarjuna) loves his childhood friend Janaki, who asks him to become rich and powerful before marrying her. With this motive, Rummy starts gambling and becomes rich in no time.

ACP Sekhar (Sayaji Shinde) notice his activities and attempts to catch him. Rummy moves to Goa where he meets Chandra (Ankur), a pub owner who also runs gambling, both of them make a deal. While on the task, Rummy rescues Sara (Paula) from Victor. Sara's sister Nadia (Linda) falls in love with him. Another woman, Sandhya (Mamta Mohandas), enters his life. She helps him with his task. Meanwhile, differences arise between Rummy and Chandra, and they become rivals. How Rummy encounters the situation with Janaki forms the rest of the story.

== Cast ==
- Nagarjuna Akkineni as Ramesh "Rummy"
- Mamta Mohandas as Janaki / Sandhya
- Ankur Vikal as Chandra
- Sayaji Shinde as Mumbai Police Commissioner Shekhar Ramisetty
- Kelly Dorji as Victor
- Brahmanandam as Six Foot Rajanna
- Sunil as Rummy's friend
- Tanikella Bharani as Rummy's father
- Jayavani as Rummy's mother
- Mukul Dev as Human Bomb Narsingh
- Harsha Vardhan as Arshad, Rummy's partner in crime
- Linda Arsenio as Nadia
- Akhilendra Mishra as Shailendra Yadav
- Stunt Silva as a smuggler
- Nirmal Pandey as Razzak Bhai (Terrorist)
- Pavala Shyamala
- Anushka Shetty as an item number in the song "Kedigadu"
- Mahek Chahal as an item number in the song "Muddante"

== Production ==
The film went through a series of name changes in production from Rummy to Mayagadu to Mosagadu, before the producers agreed on Kedi.

The song "Neeve Na Neeve Na" was shot in Milos Island in Greece.

== Soundtrack ==
Kedi

Film score by Sandeep Chowtha
- Released: 18 December 2009
- Genre: Soundtrack
- Length: 37:20
- Label: Aditya Music
- Producer: Sandeep Chowtha

Sandeep Chowtha chronology
Saleem (2009)	Kedi (2009)	Mitti (2010)

The music was composed by Sandeep Chowtha. The music released by ADITYA Music Company.

No.	Title	Lyrics	Singer(s)	Length
1.	"Kedigaadu"	Chinni Charan	Sunidhi Chauhan	3:47
2.	"Neeve Na Neeve Na"	Chinni Charan	Arijit Singh, Neha Kakkar	5:34
3.	"Enduko Enthaki"	Chinni Charan	Saleem Shahida	5:29
4.	"Relarey"	Chinni Charan	Sonu Kakkar	4:57
5.	"Short And Sweet"	Krishna Chaitanya	Sandeep Chowtha	5:04
6.	"Neelo Yemunnado"	Chinni Charan	Rahul Nambiar	4:08
7.	"Jaaniya Jaane"	Sandeep Chowtha	Neha Kakkar	5:02
8.	"Muddante"	Chinni Charan	Tippu, Geetha Madhuri	4:03
9.	"Kedigaadu (Orchestra)"	Chinni Charan	Sunidhi Chauhan	3:06
Total length:				37:20

== Reception ==
Jeevi of Idlebrain.com rated the film two and one-fourth out of five and stated that "If made well, Kedi could have become real class movie and if it’s not then the result could be catastrophic. The debutant director couldn’t handle the script well and it becomes an uninteresting fare. On a whole, Kedi fails to keep audiences interested in the movie." Radhika Rajamani of Rediff.com gave the film two out of five stars and wrote, "There aren't many twists in the story though the screenplay moves back and forth in time, which makes it a bit perplexing as we constantly have to figure out what's happening. The loopholes in the script seem glaring too."
