= Ankuram =

- Promotional poster
- Directed by: C. Umamaheswara Rao
- Written by: C. Umamaheswara Rao; Tanikella Bharani (dialogues)
- Produced by: K. V. Suresh Kumar
- Starring: Revathy; Sarath Babu; Om Puri
- Music by: Hamsalekha
- Distributed by: Film India Art Creations
- Release date: 1993
- Running time: 131 minutes
- Country: India
- Language: Telugu

Ankuram (transl. Seeding) is a 1993 Telugu-language drama film written and directed by C. Umamaheswara Rao. It stars Revathi, Sarath Babu and Om Puri. The film is about an inspiring journey of a middle-class woman to return an abandoned child to his father. Ankuram runs, in the background, issues like social stigmas, feudalism, naxalism, bureaucracy and human rights. It was featured at the 24th IFFI "Indian Panorama" mainstream section.

The plot unfolds like a Chinese puzzle; it's a journey where the viewer gradually discovers the reason for the lead being harassed by the police, the hurdles she faces uncovering a father's identity, and the darker side of an authoritarian police force and its brutality towards tribals. The film received the National Film Award for Best Feature Film in Telugu for that year.

== Plot ==
The movie starts with the marriage of a young couple. The bride Sindhura (Revathy) finds a child on a train. She wants to support the child, against the wishes of her husband's family, until she locates the child's parents.

She starts enquiring about the passenger who left his child on the train. Satyam (Om Puri), the father of the child, has been on the chase by feudals and police. The police are unable to find him and arrest his pregnant wife. Tribals protested and planned to attack the police. They were stopped by Dr. Mitra (Charuhasan), a pro-tribal doctor. A sadistic officer forced the mother to do situps, resulting in loss of her life. An angered crowd killed the police officer, which caused more violence between officials and tribals.

During the course of the search, Sindhura is implicated in a false case and loses her married life. She faces the threats by rowdies to her own parents and sisters. She persists with the help of Rao (Sarat Babu) (a civil liberty activist and lawyer), goes to the village, brings the atrocities towards the oppressed people to light, and returns the child.

Ankuram ends with the message that citizens who can speak up have the responsibility of speaking about the rights of the fellow citizens who can not speak.

== Cast ==
- Revathy as Sindhura
- Sarath Babu as Lawyer Vishwanatha Rao
- Om Puri as Satyam
- M. Balaiah as Sindhura's father
- Kota Shankar Rao as Police officer
- Charuhasan as Mitra
- Hari Prasad as Sindhura's husband
- P. L. Narayana
- Raasi as Sindhura's sister
- Sai Chand
- Raja Ravindra as Photographer
- Ali as Veera Babu
- P. R. Varalakshmi

== Soundtrack ==
The music was composed by Hamsalekha with lyrics by Sirivennela and voice by playback singers S. P. Balasubrahmanyam and Chitra.

1. "Yevaro Okaru"
2. "Hai Guru Chelaregaro" (picturized on college students)
3. "Kalakalam Kalisunte"
4. "Paka Paka Ragam"

== Awards ==
National Film Awards

- National Film Award for Best Feature Film in Telugu (1992) - (director) - C. Umamaheswara Rao (1992)

Nandi Awards

- Nandi Award for Best Director - C. Umamaheswara Rao.

Filmfare Awards South

- Filmfare Award for Best Actress - Telugu - Revathi (1992)
