= Nagarjuna (actor) =

Indian actor and film producer (born 1959)

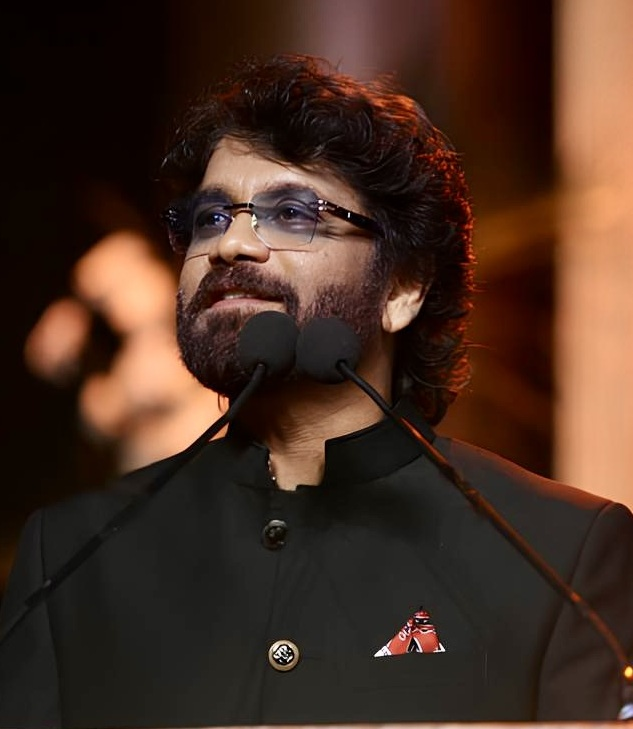
- Nagarjuna in 2024
- Born: Akkineni Nagarjuna; 29 August 1959 (age 67); Madras (present-day Chennai), Madras State, India
- Education: Eastern Michigan University (B.S.)
- Occupations: Actor; film producer; entrepreneur
- Years active: 1961–present
- Works: Full list
- Spouses: Lakshmi Daggubati (m. 1984; div. 1990) Amala Akkineni (m. 1992)
- Children: Naga Chaitanya; Akhil Akkineni
- Father: Akkineni Nageswara Rao
- Family: See Daggubati-Akkineni family
- Awards: Full list

Akkineni Nagarjuna (born 29 August 1959) is an Indian actor best known for his works primarily in Telugu cinema, as well as in a few Hindi and Tamil films. He has appeared in over 90 films and is a recipient of two National Film Awards for Ninne Pelladata (1996) and Annamayya (1997). Nagarjuna has also won ten Nandi Awards and three Filmfare Awards South. In 2013, he represented the Cinema of South India at the Delhi Film Festival's 100 Years of Indian Cinema's celebration. In 1995, he ventured into film production, with a production unit operating in Seychelles, and was a co-director of an Emmy Award-winning film animation company called Heart Animation. Nagarjuna is the co-owner of Annapurna Studios and is also the president of the non-profit film school Annapurna College of Film and Media based in Hyderabad.

In 1989, Nagarjuna starred in Mani Ratnam's romantic blockbuster Geethanjali, which won the National Film Award for Best Popular Film Providing Wholesome Entertainment. In the same year, he appeared in a bigger hit Siva, an action film directed by Ram Gopal Varma; featured at the 13th IFFI' 90. Nagarjuna went on to establish himself as a star in Telugu cinema by starring in highly successful films of varied genres, such as President Gari Pellam (1992), Rakshana (1993), Varasudu (1993), Allari Alludu (1993), Hello Brother (1994), Gharana Bullodu (1995), Ninne Pelladata (1996), Annamayya (1997), Nuvvu Vasthavani (2000), Ninne Premistha (2000), Santosham (2002), Manmadhudu (2002), Nenunnanu (2004), Mass (2004), Sri Ramadasu (2006), Don (2007), King (2008), Manam (2014), Soggade Chinni Nayana (2016), Oopiri (2016) and Bangarraju (2022). His notable ventures in other languages, include Hindi films, Shiva (1990), Khuda Gawah (1992), Zakhm (1998), Brahmāstra: Part One – Shiva (2022) and the Tamil film, Coolie (2025).

== Early life and family ==
Akkineni Nagarjuna was born on 29 August 1959 at St. Isabel's Hospital in Madras (present-day Chennai), into a Telugu speaking family of veteran actor Akkineni Nageswara Rao and Annapurna (née Kollipara) . He was the youngest of 5 kids. His family hails from Ramapuram in Krishna District of Andhra Pradesh.

The family later moved to Hyderabad, where he did his schooling in Hyderabad Public School and intermediate education from Little Flower Junior College, Hyderabad. He completed the first year of his Mechanical Engineering undergraduation at the College of Engineering, Guindy, Anna University in Madras, where former Indian cricketer Krishnamachari Srikanth was his college mate. He then transferred to Eastern Michigan University in Ypsilanti, Michigan where he earned a Bachelor of Science in Mechanical Engineering.

== Career ==
=== 1961–1988: Early career and success ===
Nagarjuna stepped into the field of acting as an infant in the movie Velugu Needalu (1961). He began acting as a child artist in Sudigundalu (1967) directed by Adurthi Subba Rao. Both movies starred his father Akkineni Nageswara Rao in the lead role. Years later he made his debut as a lead actor through the 1986 Telugu film Vikram, directed by V. Madhusudhana Rao. It is the remake of the 1983 Hindi film Hero. The film was a success, giving Nagarjuna a good start. Later, he starred in films like Majnu, directed by Dasari Narayana Rao, which was well received. Nagarjuna got positive reviews for his portrayal of a heartbroken man. He then starred in Sankeertana, a below average grosser directed by debutant Geetha Krishna with music by Ilaiyaraaja. The film was appreciated for its content and music. In 1988, he starred in the blockbuster Aakhari Poratam, scripted by Yandamuri Veerendranath, and directed by K. Raghavendra Rao where he was paired opposite Sridevi and Suhasini. In 1988, he starred in Janaki Ramudu alongside Vijayashanti was directed again by K. Raghavendra Rao.

=== 1989–1999: Breakthrough and Stardom ===
In 1989, he starred in the Mani Ratnam-directed romantic drama Geetanjali. The film won the National Film Award for Best Popular Film Providing Wholesome Entertainment in 1990. Immediately, he saw another success, Siva. This film marked the debut of director Ram Gopal Varma. This film is considered a trendsetter in Telugu cinema, and made Nagarjuna a superstar. In 1990, he subsequently made his Bollywood debut with the Hindi remake of the same film titled Shiva. Even the Hindi version saw huge box-office success. He followed it up with sub fare like Prema Yuddham, Iddaru Iddare and Nirnayam. He then starred in Jaitra Yatra, for which he received critical acclaim.

He followed it up with box office hits like Nirnayam (1991), Killer (1992) and working with eminent directors such as Fazil and Priyadarshan. Nagarjuna was fondly called "Celluloid Scientist" for his nature of experimenting with different scripts. Some of his prominent hit films released subsequently included President Gari Pellam (1992), Varasudu (1993), Allari Alludu (1993), Hello Brother (1994) and Gharana Bullodu (1995). Many of his films were also dubbed into Tamil.

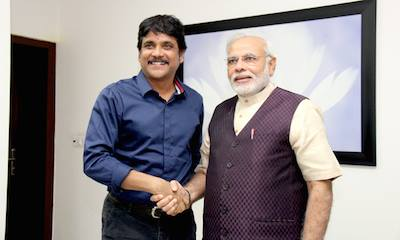
Nagarjuna seen with Indian prime minister Narendra Modi

He starred in his first Hindi-Telugu bilingual Criminal directed by Mahesh Bhatt. In 1996, Nagarjuna starred opposite actress Tabu and produced Ninne Pelladata, directed by Krishna Vamsi. The movie won the National Film Award for Best Feature Film in Telugu and Filmfare Award for Best Film – Telugu. The next year, Nagarjuna acted in Annamayya (1997), in which he portrayed the role of Annamacharya, a 15th-century Telugu singer and poet. This won him his Filmfare Award for Best Actor – Telugu and his first Nandi Award for Best Actor. He also received a National Award for this role. Later that year, he starred in the Tamil film Ratchagan, directed by Praveen Gandhi. In 1998, he appeared in the romantic comedy Aavida Maa Aavide and then plays as lead role in the Hindi action Angaaray with Akshay Kumar. He co-starred with Ajay Devgn in the drama film Zakhm. In 1999, he was seen in two films Seetharama Raju and Ravoyi Chandamama.

=== 2000–2010: Diverse roles and continued successes ===
His subsequent releases were Tamil remakes Nuvvu Vasthavani (2000), Ninne Premistha (2000) and Snehamante Idera (2001). Followed by Malalayam remakes Bava Nachadu (2001) and Adhipathi (2001). He starred in romantic comedies such as Santosham, Manmadhudu, and Sivamani. He produced Satyam in 2003, which starred his nephew Sumanth. In 2004, Nagarjuna had two releases, Nenunnanu and Mass. The latter was produced by Nagarjuna and directed by choreographer Raghava Lawrence. In 2005, Nagarjuna acted in and produced Super. In 2006, he starred in Sri Ramadasu, his second period film based on the 18th-century Telugu Saint / poet of the same name. Nagarjuna received the Nandi Award for Best Actor. In 2007, he appeared in Don and a year later, he appeared in King alongside Trisha. In 2010, he had the films Kedi and Ragada.

=== 2011–present ===
In 2011, he appeared in the action thriller Gaganam. The Tamil version was titled Payanam. He was seen also in the period action film in Rajanna In 2012, Nagarjuna) appears as Sai Baba in Shirdi Sai and then action fantasy film Damarukam. His next film Greeku Veerudu (2013) alongside Nayanthara. His next Bhai was a disaster at the box office. In 2014, Nagarjuna starred in the blockbuster family drama, Manam, directed by Vikram Kumar. He had a dual role in Soggade Chinni Nayana (2016), which turned out to be one of his biggest blockbusters. Later he played a cripple in Vamshi Paidipally's bilingual film Oopiri, which Starred Karthi. This movie which was a hit. In 2017, he played a devotional role in the film Om Namo Venkatesaya. It garnered average reviews from critics and turned out to be a disaster. He then starred in a horror film titled Raju Gari Gadhi 2 (2017), which had an average run at the box office. In 2018, he starred in the film Officer directed and produced by Ram Gopal Varma. In 2018, the action comedy Devadas, alongside Nani was released to positive reviews. In 2019, he was seen in the romantic comedy Manmadhudu 2.

The next film, Nagarjuna delivers a fine performance in the action thriller, Wild Dog (2021). He plays alongside his son Naga Chaitanya in Bangarraju (2022). Then, he acted in the Hindi fantasy action-adventure Brahmāstra: Part One – Shiva (2022). Next, Nagarjuna played as Interpol officer in the action thriller The Ghost (2022). In 2024, Naa Saami Ranga marks a triumphant comeback for Akkineni Nagarjuna. The next, Nagarjuna plays a former CBI officer who descends into crime after witnessing injustice for years in the bilingual film, Kuberaa (2025) starring with Dhanush. Follow-up to the Tamil film, Coolie (2025) playing the villain, starring Rajinikanth in the lead role and directed by Lokesh Kanagaraj.

== Other work ==
=== Television ===
Co-owner Nagarjuna during Mumbai Masters Match at Indian Badminton League 2013

Nagarjuna made his début as a television producer in 2009 with the soap opera Yuva. He was a major shareholders of the television channel Maa TV before it was sold to the Star Network. Nagarjuna hosted the Indian Telugu-language version of Who Wants to Be a Millionaire? titled Meelo Evaru Koteeswarudu. The first season of the show was telecast on MAA TV from 9 June 2014 to 7 August 2014 (40 episodes). The second season was also showcased on MAA TV from 9 December 2014 to 27 February 2015 (55 episodes). In 2015, he was honoured with the Entertainment Leader Award (Television) for his work in the show at the TV5 Business Leaders Awards ceremony. He had hosted the third, fourth, fifth, sixth and seventh season of Bigg Boss in 2019, 2020, 2021, 2022 and 2023 and the First Season of Bigg Boss Non Stop in 2022.

=== Ownerships, endorsements and earnings ===
Since 2013, he is a co-owner of the Mumbai Masters of the Indian Badminton League, along with Sunil Gavaskar, and of the Mahi Racing Team India, along with MS Dhoni. Nagarjuna currently endorses Kalyan Jewellers in Telangana and Andhra Pradesh. He was listed as No. 36 and No. 43 in Forbes India's top 100 Celebrities for the years 2012 and 2013 respectively. He was one of the co-owners of the Indian Super League club Kerala Blasters FC.

=== N3 Realty Enterprises ===
Nagarjuna is the founding partner of N3 Realty Enterprises, the parent entity for N-Convention center, N-Grill and District N. The later two establishments are now non-existent. In 2014, advocate-general K. Ramakrishna Reddy believed that the N Convention is an unauthorised and illegal structure. Subsequently, through legal opinions, a correction path of the land was initiated by the local administrators. On 24 August 2024, the Hyderabad Disaster Response and Asset Monitoring and Protection (HYDRAA) demolished the N-Convention centre citing encroachment of adjacent lake. However, Nagarjuna has clarified in a statement that the land on which N-convention has been built is a Patta Documented land and not even one cent of the land beyond that has been encroached upon. In a press conference, former member of the Lok Sabha, Balka Suman said that Nagarjuna's N-Convention center was demolished because Nagarjuna refused to pay a bribe of Rs. 400 crore as demanded by Chief Minister Revanth Reddy.

== Philanthropy ==
Nagarjuna, along with his wife Amala, are co-founders of Blue Cross of Hyderabad, recognised by the Animal Welfare Board of India. It is a non-government organisation (NGO) in Hyderabad, which works for the welfare of animals. Nagarjuna was also involved in welfare programs undertaken by the MAA TV association, and presently serves as the brand ambassador for HIV/AIDS awareness campaigns. In 2010, he starred in an HIV/AIDS animated software tutorial created by TeachAids, a nonprofit founded at Stanford University.

== Personal life ==
In February 1984, Nagarjuna married Lakshmi Daggubati, the daughter of D. Ramanaidu, a prominent film-maker, and sister of the actor Venkatesh and producer Suresh Babu. Lakshmi and Nagarjuna have one son, actor Naga Chaitanya born on 23 November 1986. However, the couple got divorced in 1990. Nagarjuna then married actress Amala on 11 June 1992, and the couple have one son, actor Akhil, born on 8 April 1994.

== Accolades ==
Nagarjuna has been the recipient of two National Film Awards, ten Nandi Awards and three Filmfare Awards South.
