= Mass (2004 film) =

2004 Indian film by Raghava Lawrence

- Film poster
- Directed by: Raghava Lawrence
- Written by: Raghava Lawrence; Paruchuri Brothers (dialogues)
- Produced by: Nagarjuna
- Starring: Nagarjuna; Jyothika; Charmy Kaur; Raghuvaran; Rahul Dev
- Cinematography: Shyam K. Naidu
- Edited by: Marthand K. Venkatesh
- Music by: Devi Sri Prasad
- Production company: Annapurna Studios
- Release date: 23 December 2004
- Running time: 162 minutes
- Country: India
- Language: Telugu
- Box office: ₹23 crore distributors' share

Mass: Dammunte Kasko is a 2004 Indian Telugu-language masala film directed by Raghava Lawrence (in his directorial debut) and produced by Nagarjuna under Annapurna Studios. The film stars Nagarjuna himself as the titular character, alongside Jyothika, Charmy Kaur, Raghuvaran and Rahul Dev. The music was composed by Devi Sri Prasad, while Shyam K. Naidu and Marthand K. Venkatesh handled the cinematography and editing respectively.

Mass was released on 23 December 2004 and became the highest-grossing film in Nagarjuna's career. The film was dubbed and released in Tamil as Veeran and later in Hindi as Meri Jung: One-Man Army. The film was unofficially remade in Bangladeshi Bengali as Khomota (2006).

== Plot ==
Ganesh, an orphan, lives with his best friend Aadi and is in love with Anjali, a college student and the daughter of Satya, a disabled crime boss in Vizag. Anjali restricts from falling for Ganesh as it would land him in danger, but she finally accepts his feelings. Anjali tells Ganesh that they should marry immediately before her brother Seshu and Satya tries to separate them. While on their way to the temple where Anjali is waiting, Ganesh finds that he forgot to bring his late mother's photo and goes back to bring it with him. Aadi reaches the temple for Ganesh and Anjali's wedding, but finds Seshu forcing her to return with him. Seshu kills Aadi when he tries to stop him from taking Anjali away. Ganesh gets enraged at Aadi's death, where moves into Vizag under a new identity as Mass and begins to eradicate Satya and Seshu's crime syndicate. In a final confrontation Ganesh fights with Seshu and defeats him, where he reunites with Anjali and leaves the city. Satya kills Seshu out of disgrace and commits suicide, thus avenging Aadi's death.

== Cast ==
- Nagarjuna as Mass / Ganesh, Anjali's love interest
- Jyothika as Anjali, Mass' love interest, Satya's daughter, Seshu's sister
- Charmy Kaur as Priya
- Raghuvaran as Satya, Seshu and Anjali's father
- Rahul Dev as Seshu, Anjali's elder brother, the Don of Visakhapatnam
- Prakash Raj as Advocate Durga Prasad
- Sunil as Aditya a.k.a. Adi, Mass' younger-brother figured best-friend
- Dharmavarapu Subramanyam as Adi's father
- Balayya as Anjali's Grandfather
- Jeeva as Police Officer
- Sameer as Police Officer
- Venu Madhav as a Beggar
- Narsing Yadav as Narsingh
- Satyam Rajesh as Taxi driver
- Karuna as Sirisha
- Apoorva as Priya's mother
- Ravi Kale as ACP of Visakhapatnam
- Varsha as Anjali's friend
- Ruthika
- Raghava Lawrence in a special appearance
- Tanu Roy in a special appearance in "Mass" song

== Soundtrack ==
Mass

Soundtrack album by Devi Sri Prasad
- Released: 25 November 2004
- Recorded: 2004
- Genre: Film soundtrack
- Length: 29:52
- Label: Aditya Music
- Producer: Devi Sri Prasad

Devi Sri Prasad chronology
Shankar Dada MBBS (2004)	Mass (2004)	Naa Alludu (2005)

Music composed by Devi Sri Prasad and was released on Aditya Music Company. The audio was released in an entertaining function held at Taramati Baradari (Golkonda).

Track list
No.	Title	Lyrics	Singer(s)	Length
1.	"Mass"	Sahithi	Ravi Varma, Mano	4:09
2.	"Vaalu Kalla Vayyari"	Sirivennela Seetharama Sastry	Karthik	5:34
3.	"Indhurudu Chandurudu"	Sahithi	Kalpana, Ranjith	5:19
4.	"Kottu Kottu Kottu"	Sahithi	Tippu, Prasanna	5:22
5.	"La La Lahirey"	Viswa	Venugopal Srirangam, Sunitha Sarathy	4:34
6.	"Naatho Vasthava"	Ramajogayya Sastry	Udit Narayan, Sumangali	4:54
Total length:				29:52

== Release and reception ==
The film opened with 191 prints.

A critic from Sify wrote that "Mass, at best packs in sufficient thrills to add up to a fairly engrossing entertainer, which keeps the popcorn popping". Jeevi of Idlebrain.com wrote that "There are no boring moments in this 2.45 hour film though. You should watch Mass on the big screen to enjoy the charming Nag in his new avatar".

== Awards and nominations ==
Award category	Artist	Result
CineMAA Award for Best Actor - Male	Nagarjuna	Won
Filmfare Award for Best Actor – Telugu	Nagarjuna	Nominated
Filmfare Award for Best Actress – Telugu	Jyothika	Nominated
Filmfare Award for Best Supporting Actress – Telugu	Charmy Kaur	Nominated
Filmfare Award for Best Dance Choreographer – South	Raghava Lawrence	Nominated
