= Varasudu =

- Movie Poster
- Directed by: E. V. V. Satyanarayana
- Screenplay by: E. V. V. Satyanarayana
- Story by: Kuku Kohli
- Produced by: D. Kishore; Murali Mohan (presents)
- Starring: Nagarjuna; Nagma; Krishna
- Cinematography: Chota K. Naidu
- Edited by: Gautham Raju
- Music by: M. M. Keeravani
- Production company: Sri Jayabheri Art Productions
- Release date: 5 May 1993
- Running time: 158 minutes
- Country: India
- Language: Telugu

Varasudu (transl. Heir) is a 1993 Indian Telugu-language action film written and directed by E. V. V. Satyanarayana. It was produced by D. Kishore under the Sri Jayabheri Art Productions banner, presented by Murali Mohan, and cinematography by Chota K. Naidu. It stars Nagarjuna, Nagma and Krishna, with music composed by M. M. Keeravani. It is a remake of the Hindi film Phool Aur Kaante (1991) which is loosely based on the Malayalam film Parampara (1990). The film was a blockbuster commercial success. The film completed a 200-day theatrical run.

== Plot ==
Vinay (Nagarjuna) studies in college where Keerthi (Nagma) enters as a new student. Vamsi is also a student in the same college. His character has negative shades. The first half of the movie revolves mostly around the love story of the hero and heroine. Dharma Teja happens to rescue Vinay from the villains (Srikanth's father and his friend), but Vinay hates Dharma Teja. An interval arrives disclosing the fact that Dharma Teja is the father of Vinay.

The second half of the movie becomes serious with Vinay's allegation on his father stating that he is a smuggler and has killed his wife. Vinay and Keerthi get married. Dharma Teja shoots Vamsi, as he tries to murder Vinay. However, the villains continue to show their grudge on Vinay. Meanwhile, Vinay's child is kidnapped. Keerthi goes to Dharma Teja for help.

Vinay finds that Dharma Teja has kidnapped the child. When asked for an explanation, Dharma Teja narrates the flashback, where he had to leave his wife to save the life of his son. Vinay and Dharma Teja are now united, much to the envy of the villains. The villains now kidnap Vinay's son, leading to the climax.

== Cast ==
- Nagarjuna as Vinay
- Nagma as Keerthi
- Krishna as Dharma Teja
- Srikanth as Vamsi
- Devaraj as Narendra
- Brahmanandam as MSM (Moola Sanka Master)
- Babu Mohan as Chanthi
- Gummadi as Principal
- Tirupathi Prakash as Vinay's friend
- Prudhvi Raj as Vinay's friend
- Jeeva as Dhama Teja's henchmen
- Gautham Raju as Vinay's friend
- Sharat Saxena
- Tanikella Bharani
- Geetha
- Hema
- M. Balayya
- Kota Shankar Rao as Police inspector
- Viswa Mohan as Student
- Sridhar as Student
- Ravi Teja as Student
- Narsing Yadav
- Master Baladitya

== Soundtrack ==
Varasudu

Film score by M. M. Keeravani
- Released: 1993
- Genre: Soundtrack
- Length: 24:33
- Label: Akash Audio
- Producer: M. M. Keeravani

M. M. Keeravani chronology
Major Chandrakanth (1993)	Varasudu (1993)	Alimayya (1993)

The music was composed by M. M. Keeravani. Music released on AKASH Audio Company.

No.	Title	Lyrics	Singer(s)	Length
1.	"Papa Hello Hello"	Veturi	S. P. Balasubrahmanyam, Chitra	5:01
2.	"Dhim Thanaka"	Vennelakanti	S. P. Balasubrahmanyam, Chitra	4:50
3.	"Silaka Laaga"	Bhuvanachandra	S. P. Balasubrahmanyam, Chitra	4:50
4.	"Cham Cham Cham"	Vennelakanti	S. P. Balasubrahmanyam, Chitra	4:29
5.	"Danger Yama Danger"	Bhuvanachandra	S. P. Balasubrahmanyam, Chitra	5:23
Total length:				24:33

== Box office ==
The film was a commercial success. The film completed a 200-day theatrical run. The film created hype before its release due to the collaboration of Nagarjuna and Krishna.
