= Vikram (1986 Telugu film) =

- Theatrical release poster
- Directed by: V. Madhusudhana Rao
- Written by: Satyanand (dialogues)
- Screenplay by: V. Madhusudhana Rao
- Story by: Subhash Ghai
- Produced by: Akkineni Venkat
- Starring: Nagarjuna; Shobana
- Cinematography: P. N. Sundaram
- Edited by: T. Krishna
- Music by: Chakravarthy
- Production company: Annapurna Studios
- Release date: 23 May 1986
- Running time: 173 minutes
- Country: India
- Language: Telugu

Vikram is a 1986 Indian Telugu-language romantic action film directed by V. Madhusudhana Rao and produced by Akkineni Venkat via Annapurna Studios. The film stars Nagarjuna and Shobana, with music composed by Chakravarthy. It is a remake of the Hindi film Hero (1983) and it is the debut of Nagarjuna as a lead actor.

== Plot ==
The film starts off with Sardar being taken to prison. To get out of the situation, he writes to his best man, Vikram. Vikram goes to Ananda Rao and warns him. He then kidnaps Ananda Rao's daughter Radha. He tells her that he is a police officer and they fall in love; however, she finds out that he is a goon. Nevertheless, she does not leave him but urges him to surrender. Transformed by true love, Vikram surrenders himself to the police and is imprisoned for two years. Back home, Radha tells her brother Rambabu the whole truth. To keep Radha from marrying someone else, he calls his friend Tommy to put on a show that Radha and Tommy love each other. Tommy misunderstands the situations and actually falls in love with Radha. When Vikram comes back, he starts working in a garage and tries to reform himself. Despite everything, Ananda Rao kicks him out of his life. After many days and events that follow, Rambabu finds out that Tommy is a smuggler. After getting released from prison, Sardar desires revenge against both Ananda Rao and Vikram, so he kidnaps Radha, Ananda Rao and Rambabu. Vikram comes at the last moment and frees all of them. As a happy ending, Ananda Rao lets Radha marry Vikram.

== Cast ==
- Nagarjuna as Vikram / Vicky Dada / Murali
- Shobana as Radha
- Satyanarayana as Ananda Rao
- Kannada Prabhakar as Sardar
- Chandra Mohan as Rambabu
- Sudhakar as Tommy
- Chetla Sriramulu
- Kanta Rao as Goppaiah
- Manik Irani as Goon
- Ahuti Prasad
- Surya
- Annapurna as Yashoda
- Rama Prabha as Sundari
- Rajya Lakshmi as Seeta
- Pushpalatha as Anasuya
- Anuradha as item number
- Gummadi
- Shivanandakumar as Kota Surya Reddy

== Soundtrack ==
The music was composed by Chakravarthy. Lyrics written by Veturi.

Song title	Singers	length
"Konda Konallo"	P. Susheela	5:22
"Ding Dong"	S. P. Balasubrahmanyam, P. Susheela, Mano, Ramesh	4:25
"O Kalama"	K. J. Yesudas	4:39
"Neeve Raagam"	S. P. Balasubrahmanyam, P. Susheela	4:45
"Nee Preme Naa Pranam"	S. P. Balasubrahmanyam, P. Susheela	5:44
"Salami Dhigo"	S. P. Balasubrahmanyam, S. Janaki	3:50
