= Shirdi Sai =

2012 Telugu film directed by K. Raghavendra Rao

- Theatrical release poster
- Directed by: K. Raghavendra Rao
- Screenplay by: K. Raghavendra Rao
- Story by: Bhaktha Suresh Kumar
- Based on: Life of Sai Baba of Shirdi
- Produced by: Mahesh Reddy; Girish Reddy
- Starring: Nagarjuna; Srikanth; Srihari
- Cinematography: S. Gopal Reddy
- Edited by: Shravan Katikaneni
- Music by: M. M. Keeravani
- Production company: AMR Sai Krupa Entertainments
- Distributed by: Sree Lakshmi Sai Films (overseas); Sri Venkateshwara Film (Nellore)
- Release date: 6 September 2012
- Running time: 142 minutes
- Country: India
- Language: Telugu

Shirdi Sai is a 2012 Indian Telugu-language biographical film, produced by A.Mahesh Reddy on AMR Sai Krupa Entertainments banner, directed by K. Raghavendra Rao. Starring Nagarjuna as the 19th-20th century spiritual guru Sai Baba of Shirdi who lived in western India, it is the cinematic depiction of some of his landmark life episodes, his teachings and his way of life. Music was composed by M. M. Keeravani. Shirdi Sai was released worldwide on 6 September 2012, and has received mixed to positive reviews while Nagarjuna received critical acclaim for his performance in the title role with most reviewers hailing this as one of his career best performances.

== Plot ==
Shirdi Sai appears in Shirdi at an early age and disappears. He goes to the Himalayas and returns to Shirdi after a gap of 9 years. He chooses a dilapidated mosque as his abode. Amazed by his presence and miracles, the local people start calling him Sai Baba. He kept helping people around and spreading communal harmony by saying that there is only one God. Certain local people are suspicious of Sai Baba after they learn about his greatness over a period of time. The rest of the story is all about what Sai Baba did to make Shirdi the only pilgrimage for people of all religions and entering Samadhi.

== Cast ==
- Nagarjuna as Sai Baba of Shirdi
- Master Vijay as Young Saibaba
- Srikanth as Dasaganu
- Srihari as Colonel Wales
- Sai Kumar as Nanavali
- Sayaji Shinde as Bhatia
- Sarath Babu as Mahalsapati
- Dharmavarapu Subramanyam as Nayak [Animal Seller]
- Tanikella Bharani as Bhooti
- Bramhanandam as Sandeham
- Ali as Appoo
- Ananth as Dappoo
- Sai Kiran as Vishnu, Rama & Krishna
- Koushik Babu as Tatya
- Master Athulith as Young Tatya
- Sameer Hasan as Shiva
- Deeshetulu as Venkhusa
- Ashok Kumar
- Jenny
- Kamalinee Mukherjee as Radhakrishna Mai
- Vinaya Prasad as Baajiya Bai
- Rohini Hattangadi as Ganga Bai
- Rujuta Deshmukh as Lakshmi Bai
- Jhansi
- Dipali Dodke as Radha Bai
- Jyothi Reddy as Lakshmi
- Karuna Bhooshan as Parvathi
- Pramodini as Saraswathi
- Nagesh Bhosale as Chand Patil
- Devendra Dodke as Shyaama
- Gundu Sudarshan
- Dinakar Gavande
- Ravi Bhath
- Aditya
- Pardha Saradhi

== Reception ==
The film received mixed to positive reviews with most reviewers hailing Nagarjuna's performance as one of his best and major plus point of this film. He received wide critical acclaim for his work in this film. Popular Telugu movie reviewing website idle brain gave a positive review stating "Nagarjuna epitomized Shirdi Sai Baba with his perfect portrayal of the sadguru. His pure eyes, calmness in the face and authentic body language makes us all fall in love with his character. Nagarjuna is extraordinary in climax episode with a white beard. Nagarjuna will get awards for his exceptional work. Since it’s a bio-pic, Shirdi Sai should not be viewed like a commercial film. Everyone of us has the curiosity to know more about Sai Baba. We might have read some books. But none of these readings give us a complete picture on life and times of Sai Baba. The film Sai Baba attempts to tell the world about the making of an enlightened man called Sai Baba who is revered as a God today. You may watch Shirdi Sai with an academic interest.".

Rediff.com gave a positive review and rated 3 on a scale of 5, stating "Nagarjuna steals the show as Shirdi Sai. He exudes serenity and tranquillity necessary for portraying such a role. The calmness in his face and body language and the compassion in his eyes are remarkable. Shirdi Sai is yet another feather in Nagarjuna's cap after Annamayya and Sriramadasu. The film has a shot of the sanctum at Shirdi as a bonus for followers of the sage!"

123telugu.com quoted "Nagarjuna deserves a hearty applause for having the courage to take up this role and he has managed to pull it off with conviction.This film will appeal immensely to Sai Baba devotees and it will be a good watch for casual movie lovers. Watch the film without any expectations and immerse yourself in Sai Baba’s spirituality.

The Hindu gave a positive review stating, " Nagarjuna leads from the front, putting up a performance marked with maturity and restraint. In the last one hour of the film, you tend to forget you are watching an actor rooted in mainstream cinema. Bent with age and bereft of his usual mannerisms, the actor comes up with a commendable performance. The supporting cast that includes Srikanth, Sarath Babu, Rohini Hattangady, Shayaji Shinde, Saikumar and others come up with credible performances. Is Shirdi Sai worth your time and money? It surely is for Saibaba devotees or if you want to watch Nagarjuna revel in his role of Saibaba."

NDTV quoted that "Far different from regular cinema with clichéd performance, run-of-the-mill storyline, director K Raghavendra Rao's Shirdi Sai takes you on a spiritual journey of self-actualization, purity and sanctity, The Box Office Collection Was Above 30 Crores Which is a good record for deviotional flicks.Times of India also gave a good rating stating that "A film like Shirdi Sai calls for strong conviction and Nagarjuna's move to take up this film is commendable. Entertainment oneindia praised the individual performances and technical aspects of the film.

== Soundtrack ==
Shirdi Sai

Film score by M. M. Keeravani
- Released: 30 July 2012
- Recorded: 2012
- Genre: Soundtrack
- Length: 60:39
- Label: Vel Records
- Producer: M. M. Keeravani

M. M. Keeravani chronology
Eega (2012)	Shirdi Sai (2012)	Anaamika (2014)

The music was composed by M. M. Keeravani. Music released on Vel Records Music Company.

No.	Title	Lyrics	Singer(s)	Length
1.	"Sada Nimba"	Traditional Hymn	M. M. Keeravani	1:03
2.	"Saranu Saranu"	Sattipandu Medicherla	Madhu Balakrishnan, Sunitha	6:25
3.	"Okkade Devudu"	Suddala Ashok Teja	Nagarjuna, Shankar Mahadevan	4:23
4.	"Hari Pada Charitha Hara"	Ramajogayya Sastry	M. M. Keeravani, Sunitha	4:12
5.	"Om Sai Ram"	Siva Shakthi Datta	Shweta Pandit	3:08
6.	"Manava Seve"	M. M. Keeravani	Deepu, Aditi Paul	5:01
7.	"Sri Rama Jaya Rama"	Vyasa	Hariharan, Malavika	5:14
8.	"Sai Ante Thalli"	Chandrabose	S. P. Balasubrahmanyam, Sunitha	6:02
9.	"Datthatreyuni"	Vyasa	M. M. Keeravani, Sonu Nigam, Teesha Nigam	5:01
10.	"Ekkadayya Sai"	Sattipandu Medicherla	Sunitha	1:18
11.	"Parama Yogindrulaku"	Vyasa	M. M. Keeravani	3:32
12.	"Nee Padamula"	Ramajogayya Sastry	M. M. Keeravani	5:08
13.	"Vasthunna Baba"	Chandrabose	S. P. Balasubrahmanyam, M. M. Keeravani, Saikumar, Revanth, Rahul Sipligunj, Chaitra H. G.	5:34
14.	"Aarathi"	Siva Shakthi Datta	Sunitha	4:06
15.	"Om Sai Sri Sai (Bhajana)"	Traditional Hymn	Karthik, Kousalya	5:39
Total length:				60:39

== Accolades ==
Ceremony	Category	Nominee	Result
2nd South Indian International Movie Awards	Best Actor	Nagarjuna	Nominated
2nd South Indian International Movie Awards	[Best Debutant Producer	Mahesh Reddy, Girish Reddy	Nominated

== See also ==
- Shirdi Ke Sai Baba, a 1977 film starring Sudhir Dalvi as Sai Baba of Shirdi
- Sri Shirdi Saibaba Mahathyam, a 1986 Telugu film starring Vijayachander as Sai Baba of Shirdi
- Jagadguru Sri Shiridi Saibaba, a 2009 Telugu film starring B. V. Reddy as Sai Baba of Shirdi
- Mere Sai – Shraddha Aur Saburi, a Television series between 2021-2023 starring Tushar Dalvi, Abeer Soofi and Abhishek Nigam as Sai Baba of Shirdi

== Others ==
- VCD & DVD on Volga Videos, Hyderabad
