= Kshetram (film) =

- Movie poster
- Directed by: T. Venu Gopal
- Screenplay by: T. Venu Gopal
- Story by: T. Venu Gopal
- Produced by: G. Govinda Raju
- Starring: Jagapati Babu; Priyamani; Shaam
- Cinematography: M. V. Raghu
- Edited by: Kotagiri Venkateswara Rao
- Music by: Koti
- Production company: Sri Balaji Movie Makers
- Release date: 29 December 2011
- Running time: 145 minutes
- Country: India
- Language: Telugu

Kshetram is a 2011 Indian Telugu-language fantasy film directed by T Venu Gopal. Starring Jagapati Babu, Priyamani, and Shaam with music composed by Koti. The film is a heroine-centric film and Jagapathi Babu and Shaam play Priyamani's love interests.

== Plot ==
The film begins in the village Kshetram where 100 years ago, King Naga Penchalayya, the clan of Krishnadevaraya built a shrine temple for Lakshmi Narasimha Swamy. After a while, the idol of the supreme deity is hidden in the forest to prevent invulnerable from invaders. In the posterior, despite several attempts, the deity for the territory's prosperity cannot be retrieved, but in avail, generations pass on. Presently, Chakradeva Rayalu / Chakri, the current successor, studies abroad and backs a North Indian girl, Sohini Agarwal. Spotting her, Chakri's father, Viswanatha Rayalu, is eerily as she exactly resembles Lakshmi, the wife of his elder brother, Veera Narasimharayalu.

Apart from that, the temple's prominent priest, Venkatacharya, always pursues him to complete the ritual via Chakradeva Rayalu, which intimidates him. One day, Chakri asks Sohini to dress up like his aunt to surprise everyone, and she does so. But deplorably, she becomes into a frenzy and slaughters Viswanatha Rayalu. Later, Sohini walks to their ancestral house of Chakri, where he views strange supernatural events. On a tip-off, Venkatacharya Chakri contacts and calls a sacred saint from the Sri Chakra Pettam, who exposes the spirit inside Sohini. Stunningly, it is Lakshmi who gives the revelation.

Twenty-five years ago, Veera Narasimharayalu was an esteemed arbiter as a deity. In his reign, that area is eternal from four sides. Lakshmi is his devoted & dedicated wife and eternal love blossoms between them. Viswanatha Rayalu is malevolent and invariably begrudges about his vogue. He stays still, waiting for a spot, and poses as his true blue. Now, Veera Narasimharayalu is conscious that people are still in poverty in his realm, and the only solution is to install a deity. Hence, he determines to carry out the ritual, which indicates a risk. Whoever set his heart on ritual has fallen to sudden death for generations. Despite that, Veera Narasimharayalu begins the ceremony by renaming himself Naga Penchalayya. In the act, he is backstabbed to deathblow by Viswanatha Rayalu to conquer his position. Before leaving his breath, he takes an oath to accomplish the ritual. Lakshmi pledges to finish the undertaking as Naga Penchalamma. Then, Viswanatha Rayalu slays her, too, along with the family.

As of today, Lakshmi's soul proclaims that Chakradeva Rayalu must fulfill their dream as he is born with the trait of Veera Narasimharayalu. At last, it magnificently accomplishes the installation of the idol, and Lakshmi's soul mingles in the universe. Finally, the movie ends on a happy note, with the public giving high applause to the sacred sacrifice of Veera Narasimharayalu & Lakshmi, who are immortal in history.

== Cast ==
- Jagapati Babu as Veera Narasimha Rayalu (Naga Penchalaiah)
- Priyamani in a dual role as Lakshmi (Naga Penchalamma) and Sohini Agarwal
- Shaam as Chakradeva "Chakri" Rayalu
- Kota Srinivasa Rao as Chinnanna
- Adithya Menon as Viswanadha Rayulu
- Tanikella Bharani as the priest
- Brahmaji as an SP
- Brahmanandam
- Chalapathi Rao
- Posani Krishna Murali
- Vijayaranga Raju
- Rajiv Kanakala
- Jakkie
- Uttej
- Annapurna
- Siva Parvati
- Prabhakar
- Jayalalitha
- Hema
- Surekha Vani
- Manju Bhargavi
- Tarzan
- Meena
- Alapathi Lakshmi

== Production ==
Shooting for the film was halted after the Telugu film industry went on a strike due to the differing demands between the producers, employees, and actors. The film is female-oriented.

== Soundtrack ==
Kshetram

Film score by Koti
- Released: 2011
- Genre: Soundtrack
- Length: 25:19
- Label: Aditya Music
- Producer: Koti

Koti chronology
Raaj (2011)	Kshetram (2011)	Mugguru (2011)

Music composed by Koti. Lyrics written by Suddala Ashok Teja. Music released on ADITYA Music Company.

Track list
No.	Title	Singer(s)	Length
1.	"Jwalaahobila"	Sri Krishna	4:42
2.	"Chukka Chukka"	Dheeraj, Sravana Bhargavi	3:37
3.	"Dheera Dheera"	Mano, Chitra	4:40
4.	"Narasimha Raya"	Mano	4:53
5.	"Rayalavari Abbayi"	Karthik, Malavika, Anjana Sowmya	4:11
6.	"Hey Kala"	Karthik, Chitra	3:16
Total length:			25:19

== Release ==
A critic from Rediff gave the film a rating of one out of five stars and stated that "Director T Venuogopal takes up the theme in Kshetram but fails miserably. The treatment is shabby and production values are poor".
