= Suspect (disambiguation) =

A suspect is a person suspected of committing a crime.

Suspect or suspects may also refer to:

== Film and television ==
- Suspect (1960 film), British thriller directed by Roy and John Boulting
- Suspect (1961 film), Australian television play
- Suspect (1987 film), American legal thriller starring Cher and Dennis Quaid
- "Suspect", an episode of American television series Smallville
- Suspect, a 2007 made-for-TV film directed by Guy Ritchie
- Suspect (game show), 2007 British children's TV series featuring mystery solving
- Suspect (2008 film), German short film
- Suspect (TV series), 2022 British police procedural
- Suspects (TV series), 2014 British police procedural
- The Suspect (1916 film), American silent film
- The Suspect (1944 film), American film directed by Robert Siodmak
- The Suspect (1975 film), Italian thriller-drama film
- The Suspect (1981 film), Egyptian romance film
- The Suspect (1998 film), Hong Kong action film
- The Suspect (2013 South Korean film), spy-action thriller
- The Suspect (2013 American film), thriller directed and written by Stuart Connelly
- Suspect (2024 film), Hong Kong crime drama
- The Suspect (2025 film), Indian crime drama
- The Suspect (TV series), 2022 British police procedural
- The Suspects (1957 film), French crime thriller
- The Suspects (1974 film), French-Italian crime drama
- Suspect: The Shooting of Jean Charles de Menezes, 2025 British television miniseries

== Other uses ==
- Suspect (play), a 1937 play by Edward Percy and Reginald Denham
- Suspects, a late 1970s California rock band that included founders of the Paisley Underground genre
- Suspect, a 2013 novel by Robert Crais
- Suspect (video game), a 1984 computer game
- Suspect (rapper), British rapper
- "Suspect", a song by Joey Badass from 1999

== See also ==
- Suspekt, Danish musical group
- Suspicion (disambiguation)
