= Thozha =

Thozha, literally "friend" in Tamil, may refer to:

- Thozha (2008 film), directed by N. Sundaresan
- Oopiri, a 2016 Telugu film, titled Thozha in Tamil, directed by Vamsi Paidipally
