= Sumanth =

Indian actor (born 1975)

- Born: Yarlagadda Sumanth Kumar; 9 February 1975 (age 51); Hyderabad, Andhra Pradesh (now in Telangana), India
- Education: Columbia College Chicago
- Occupations: Actor; producer
- Years active: 1999–present
- Spouse: Keerthi Reddy (m. 2004; div. 2006)
- Relatives: See Daggubati-Akkineni Family

Yarlagadda Sumanth Kumar (born 9 February 1975), known mononymously as Sumanth, is an Indian actor who works predominantly in Telugu cinema. He is the eldest grandson of Telugu actor Akkineni Nageswara Rao. He is also a partner in Annapurna Studios.

After debuting in Prema Katha (1999), he has since starred in notable films like Satyam (2003), Gowri (2004), Godavari (2006), Madhumasam (2007), Golconda High School (2011), Malli Raava (2017), and Anaganaga (2025).

== Background and early life ==
Sumanth was born in Hyderabad, India, on 9 February 1975 as the only son of Surendra Yarlagadda and Satyavathi Akkineni. His younger sister is the actress and film producer Supriya, who produces films under their father's production company, S. S. Creations. He is the eldest grandchild of the Telugu film actor Akkineni Nageswara Rao. A few months after his birth, Sumanth's parents returned to the US where they were residing. Sumanth, however, remained in India on the request of his grandfather Akkineni Nageswara Rao, who was then on a hiatus from films after a major heart surgery. The latter had often said that his busy acting career prevented him from fully experiencing fatherhood with his own children, so he wished to raise his first grandchild himself.

=== Family ===
Sumanth's father, Surendra Yarlagadda, is a former film producer, noted for several hit films such as Muchataga Mugguru (1985), Collector Gari Abbayi (1987), Rao Gari Illu (1988), Siva (1989), and Gaayam (1993). Actor Nagarjuna Akkineni is his maternal uncle. Actors Naga Chaitanya, Akhil Akkineni, and Sushanth are his cousins.

In August 2004, Sumanth married former actress Keerthi Reddy. They divorced amicably in 2006.

=== Education ===
Sumanth studied at the Hyderabad Public School, graduating in 1991. Popular politician, Sri Y S Jaganmohan Reddy, who became the Chief Minister of Andhra Pradesh many years later, was Sumanth's classmate at the Hyderabad Public School. (The Times of India dated 9 Feb, 2019). For his undergraduate studies, he enrolled in an engineering course in Michigan. Realising after two years that it wasn't in his best interest, he transferred to Columbia College Chicago, from where he graduated with a B. A. in Film Studies in 1997.

== Career ==
Sumanth made his debut as a lead actor in Ram Gopal Varma's Prema Katha in 1999. Although not commercially successful, the film was critically acclaimed and received five Nandi awards, including the Nandi Award for Best Feature Film. Even though it was just an average earner when released, his second film Yuvakudu (2000) directed by Karunakaran would go on to be widely considered an underrated film later on. Sumanth’s lean box office run continued with his next films Pelli Sambandham, Ramma Chilakamma, and Snehamante Idera, despite popular actors from his family Akkineni Nageswara Rao and Nagarjuna sharing screen in two of them.

Sumanth’s box office breakthrough came in late 2003 with Satyam where he played the role of a struggling lyricist. In addition to commercial success, Sumanth received critical acclaim, with Idlebrain.com commenting, "there is not even a single moment where you can find any shortcomings in his histrionics". This was followed by another hit Gowri in 2004. This action drama was a remake of the Tamil film Thirumalai. Idlebrain.com Jeevi wrote, “Sumanth was good as usual and performed really well in fights”. After consecutive hits, he continued in the action genre with Dhana 51 (2005), which was a flop, and the average running Mahanandi (2006).

Sumanth altered his path in 2006, starring in Sekhar Kammula's Godavari, which remains one of the most acclaimed films in his career. On top of immense critical and commercial success, this film also garnered five Nandi awards and a Filmfare award. Rediff.com said that Godavari is “a film that reminds us that cinema can be so much more ”. Sumanth next acted in Chinnodu, which released in October 2006 and was an average grosser. In 2007, he starred in the romantic drama Madhumasam, produced by D. Ramanaidu and directed by Chandra Siddhartha. This film was a hit, having a 100 days theatrical run. Sumanth next did the lead in Classmates, which generated a curiosity as it was the first time that its director K. Vijaya Bhaskar was without his usual collaborator Trivikram Srinivas as dialogue writer. Additionally, it was a remake of the trend-setting Malayalam film Classmates. Despite positive reviews, the film however failed at the box office. Sumanth’s next two films were Pourudu (2008), which was a moderate success, and Boni (2009) which was a failure.

Sumanth's following film Golconda High School in 2011 was a sports drama directed by Mohana Krishna Indraganti. Based on an English novel "The Men Within" written by Harimohan Paruvu, an ex-Ranji Trophy cricketer, this film was positively reviewed and was well received by audiences. Idlebrain.com said that Sumanth's role as a cricket coach was his "career best performance". This was followed by failures like Raaj (2011), Daggaraga Dooranga (2011), Emo Gurram Egaravachu (2014) and Naruda Donoruda (2016). Among these, Naruda Donoruda was anticipated as it was a remake of the Hindi film Vicky Donor. The film however received disappointing reviews, and its theatrical run was further negatively affected by the coinciding 2016 Indian banknote demonetisation.

Sumanth made a comeback in late 2017 with the romantic drama Malli Raava, under the direction of debutant Gowtam Tinnanuri. This film was a box office hit and was well reviewed, with Firstpost calling it “a pleasant surprise” and "Sumanth's best film in a long time". It won four awards including best film from the Telugu Chamber of Film and Commerce. Sumanth next played the lead role in Subrahmanyapuram (2018). This mystery thriller was commercially an average runner after receiving mixed reviews. It was followed by the flop Idam Jagath (2018). Sumanth then played the lead role in Kapatadhaari, which was a remake of the Kannada neo-noir thriller film Kavaludaari. This film released in February 2021 with 50% theatre occupancy COVID-19 pandemic restrictions and turned out to be commercially unsuccessful despite positive reviews. His next film Malli Modalaindi (2021) released directly on OTT to negative reviews.

In 2019, he played his grandfather in NTR: Kathanayakudu. Jeevi of Idlebrain.com wrote, "Sumanth is exceptionally good as ANR. His pristine Telugu diction and his acting is impeccable. He matched NBK in every stature. He looks like ANR in some angles (especially in older getup)". In 2022 and 2023, Sumanth did supporting roles in the hit films Sita Ramam (2025) and Vaathi.

In 2024 and 2025, Sumanth played the lead in the one-character thriller film Aham Reboot and Anagananga, both of which had a direct OTT release. The former was not well received. Regarding the latter film, The Hindu said Anganaga "celebrates the joy of storytelling, as Sumanth chips in with one of his finest performances". It went on to become a major streaming hit .

== Filmography ==
Key
†	Denotes films that have not yet been released

=== As actor ===
Year	Title	Role	Notes	Ref.
1999	Prema Katha	Suri	Debut Film	
2000	Yuvakudu	Siva		
2000	Pelli Sambandham	Grandson		
2001	Ramma Chilakamma	Kasi		
2001	Snehamante Idera	Chandru		
2003	Satyam	Satyam		
2004	Gowri	Gowri Shankar		
2005	Dhana 51	Dhana		
2005	Mahanandi	Shankar		
2006	Godavari	Sreeram "Ram"		
2006	Chinnodu	Chinna		
2007	Classmates	Ravi Kiran		
2008	Madhumasam	Sanjay		
2009	Pourudu	Ajay		
2009	Boni	DD		
2011	Golconda High School	Sampath		
2011	Raaj	Raaj		
2011	Daggaraga Dooranga	Gowtham		
2014	Emo Gurram Egaravachu	Bullebbai		
2016	Naruda Donoruda	Vicky		
2017	Malli Raava	Karthik		
2018	Subrahmanyapuram	Karthik		
2018	Idam Jagath	Nishith		
2019	NTR: Kathanayakudu	Akkineni Nageswara Rao		
2019	NTR: Mahanayakudu	Akkineni Nageswara Rao	Cameo appearance	
2021	Kapatadhaari	Gowtham		
2022	Malli Modalaindi	Vikram		
2022	Sita Ramam	Brigadier Vishnu Sharma	Nominated–SIIMA Award for Best Supporting Actor – Telugu	
2023	Vaathi	A. Muthu Kumar IAS	Cameo appearance; Bilingual film	
2023	Sir	A. S. Murthy IAS	Cameo appearance; Bilingual film	
2024	Aham Reboot	RJ Nilay		
2025	Anaganaga	Vyas Kumar		
2026	Newton's 3rd Law	Inspector Vasudev		
2026	Mahendragiri Varahi	Siddharth		
TBA	Anangana Oka Rowdy †	Waltair Seenu	Pre- production	

=== As dubbing artist ===
- 83 (2021) for Ranveer Singh (Telugu dubbed version)
