= Siva Reddy =

Indian actor and mimicry artist

- Born: Siva Reddy; 1974 (age 51–52); Ramagundam, Karimnagar, Telangana, India
- Genre: Impressionist (entertainment)
- Occupations: Mimicry, Comedy actor
- Years active: 1994-present
- Website: http://shivareddy.co.in

Siva Reddy is an Indian mimicry artist, comedian and actor. He has worked in over 100 films and performed 6000 over stage shows, both in India and abroad in Telugu. He is popular for his imitation of popular Telugu film actors.

== TV shows ==
- Gemini TV - Jalsa (As an Anchor)
- Zee Telugu - Chittam chittam Praya chittam
- Gemini TV - Koteswara Rao
- Maa TV – Gharshana Dance Show
- ETV - Comedy Gang
- Gemini TV - Joolakataka (as Judge)

== Live shows ==
- Stage Show for Y.S. Rajashekhar Reddy
- Sakshi – Vinayaka chavithi – Multiple Times
- TV9 – Vinayaka chavithi – Mostly every Year
- NTV - Different Shows
- HMTV - Different Shows
- Vajrotsavam - 2007
- Open Heart with RK - ABN Telugu - 06-Jun-2019
- TANA Celebrations 2003, 2005 ... 2019 (Multiple Times)
- ATA Celebrations 2004, 2006 and many more

== Filmography ==
Year	Title	Role
1997	Circus Sattipandu	
2000	Bachelors	
2001	Anandam	Purse
2001	Manasantha Nuvve	Minister's son
2001	Chirujallu	
2001	Ammayi Kosam	
2002	Trinetram	
2002	Kanulu Moosina Neevaye	
2002	Avunu Valliddaru Istapaddaru!	
2002	Hai	
2002	O Chinadana	
2003	Nee Manasu Naaku Telusu	
2003	Vasantham	
2003	Jodi No.1	
2003	Aayudham	
2003	Kedi No 1	
2003	Idi Maa Ashokgadi Love Story	
2003	Naaga	
2004	Athade Oka Sainyam	Siva Reddy
2004	Kaasi	
2004	Adrushyam	
2004	Donga Dongadi	
2004	Xtra	
2004	Aithe Enti	
2004	Nenunnanu	
2004	Adavi Ramudu	
2005	Youth	Arjun (uncredited)
2005	Pellam Pichodu	
2005	Nireekshana	
2005	Yuvakulu	
2005	Rambha Neeku Oorvasi Naaku	
2005	Chakram	
2006	Stalin	Stalin's brother
2006	Rajababu	
2007	Classmates	
2007	Madhumasam	
2008	Rainbow	Shiva
2008	Somberi	
2008	Kousalya Supraja Rama	
2009	Sweet Heart	
2009	Satyameva Jayate	
2010	Aalasyam Amrutam	
2010	Pappu	
2010	Buridi	
2010	Namo Venkatesa	Musician
2011	Jai Bolo Telangana	
2011	Vastadu Naa Raju	
2011	Nagaram Nidrapothunna Vela	
2011	Dookudu	Ajay's friend
2012	Thikka	
2012	Yamaho Yama	
2013	Nenem Chinna Pillana	
2014	Ee Varsham Sakshiga	
2014	Rough	
2014	Current Theega	
2016	Nayaki	
2017	2 Countries	
2017	Meda Meeda Abbayi	
2017	Jayadev	B. V. S. S. N. L. Murthy
2021	Savitri W/O Satyamurthy	
2021	Devineni	
2022	Swathi Muthyam	
2022	Andaru Bagundali Andulo Neenundali	
2023	Rent	
2024	We Love Bad Boys	
2025	Andhra King Taluka	Anji

== Awards ==
- Nandi Award - 2004
- The Vamsi-Berkeley award for Athade Oka Sainyam
- Bharata-Muni award for Ammayi Kosam
