= Suspicion =

Suspicion(s), The Suspicion, or Suspicious may refer to:

- Suspicion (emotion), a feeling of mistrust

== Film and television ==
=== Film ===
- Suspicion (1918 film), an American silent film directed by John M. Stahl
- Suspicion (1941 film), an American film noir directed by Alfred Hitchcock
- Suspicion (1956 film), a French film directed by Pierre Billon
- Suspicion (1982 film), a Japanese film directed by Yoshitaro Nomura
- Suspicions (film), a 2010 Canadian thriller film directed by Patrick Demers

=== Television ===
==== Series ====
- Suspicion (American TV series), a 1957–1958 mystery drama series
- Suspicion, 1972 British TV series, with Daphne Heard
- Suspicion (2003 TV series), a British drama thriller series
- Suspicion (2022 TV series), a British thriller series

==== Episodes ====
- "Suspicion" (Auf Wiedersehen, Pet), 1983
- "Suspicion" (Code Lyoko: Evolution), 2013
- "Suspicion" (NCIS), 2007
- "Suspicion" (Stargate Atlantis), 2004
- "Suspicions" (Dynasty), 1986
- "Suspicions" (Star Trek: The Next Generation), 1993

== Literature ==
- Suspicion (Ce qui était perdu), a 1930 novel by François Mauriac
- "Suspicion", a 1939 short story by Dorothy L. Sayers
- Suspicion (novel) (Der Verdacht), a 1951 novel by Friedrich Dürrenmatt
- Suspicion (manga), a 1982 manga by Osamu Tezuka
- Isaac Asimov's Robot City: Suspicion, a 1987 novel by Mike McQuay
- The Suspicion (novel), a 1998 Animorphs novel by K. A. Applegate

== Music ==
- Suspicions (album), by Houston Person, 1980
- "Suspicion" (Les Paul song), 1948
- "Suspicion" (Terry Stafford song), originally recorded by Elvis Presley, 1962; released by Stafford, 1964
- "Suspicion" (R.E.M. song), 1999
- "Suspicions" (song), by Eddie Rabbitt, 1979; covered by Tim McGraw, 2007
- "Suspicion", a song by LP from Lost on You, 2016
- "Suspicion", a song by Richard Marx from My Own Best Enemy, 2004
- "Suspicious", a song by Ivy from All Hours, 2011

== See also ==
- Suspect (disambiguation)
- Under Suspicion (disambiguation)
