= Rahul Haridas =

Indian film actor

- Born: 2 November 1988 (age 37); Hyderabad
- Other names: Tyson, Rahul, Happydays Tyson
- Occupation: Actor
- Years active: 2007–2014, 2017–present

Rahul Haridas is an Indian film actor known for his works in Telugu cinema. He made his film debut with Sekhar Kammula's 2007 film, Happy Days.

== Career ==
Haridas made his debut with Happy Days in 2007, appearing as one of the leads along with Varun Sandesh, Sonia Deepti and Gayatri Rao. In 2008, he appeared in Rainbow, directed by V. N. Aditya. From 2014 to 2017 he took a break and In 2017, he made his comeback in the real story based crime-thriller, Venkatapuram starring Mahima Makwana.

== Filmography ==
Year	Film	Role	Notes
2007	Happy Days	Arjun "Tyson"	Debut
2008	Rainbow	Shyam	
2011	Mugguru	Maruthi	
2013	Prema Oka Maikam	Lalith	
2014	Love You Bangaram	Akash	
2017	Venkatapuram	Anand	
2024	Bhaje Vaayu Vegam	Goppula Raju	
