= Kanakala =

Kanakala is a Telugu surname. Notable people with the surname include:

- Suma Kanakala, Indian television anchor
- Rajiv Kanakala, Telugu and Kannada film and television actor
- Devadas Kanakala, Indian actor
- Lakshmi Kanakala, Indian actress
- Roshan Kanakala, Indian actor in Telugu films
