= Venkatapuram (film) =

2017 Indian film by Venu Madikanti

- Theatrical release poster
- Directed by: Venu Madikanti
- Produced by: Shreyas Srinivas
- Starring: Rahul; Mahima Makwana
- Cinematography: Sai Prakash Ummadisingu
- Edited by: Madhu
- Music by: Achu
- Release date: 12 May 2017
- Running time: 129 min
- Country: India
- Language: Telugu

Venkatapuram is a 2017 Indian Telugu-language crime thriller film claimed to be based on true events. The film stars Rahul Haridas and newcomer Mahima Makwana. The film was touted to be Rahul's comeback.

== Cast ==
- Rahul as Anand
- Mahima Makwana as Chaitra
- Ajay as Ajay Varma
- Jogi Naidu as Venkata Naidu
- Ajay Ghosh as SI K. Durga Prasad
- Y. Kasi Viswanath as Chaitra's father

== Soundtrack ==
Venkatapuram

Soundtrack album
- Released: April 2017
- Recorded: 2017
- Genre: World music
- Label: Mango Music
- Producer: Shreyas Srinivas & T Phani Kumar

Song title	Singers	Lyricist
Egire	Keka Ghoshal, Yazin Nizar	Vanamali
O Maya	Benny Dayal	Anantha Sriram
Kokkoroko	Satya Yamini, Shruthi, Raghuram, Sri krishna, Deepu	Anantha Sriram
Thanevaro	Achu	Anantha Sriram
Kaalam	Dhanunjay, Sai Shilpa	Anantha Sriram
Thanevaro (Reprise)	Vijay Yesudas	Anantha Sriram

== Reception ==
In its review, The Times of India concluded, "The movie makes for a good one time watch if you can wait until the end."
