= Eenam Thettatha Kattaru =

Eenam Thettaatha Kaattaaru
- Directed by: P. Vinod Kumar
- Written by: Purushan Alappuzha
- Screenplay by: Purushan Alappuzha
- Produced by: Sreelakshmi Thankam pictures
- Starring: Sukumaran; Jayalalita; Ganesh Kumar
- Cinematography: S. B. Raj
- Music by: Navas Rahman
- Release date: 1989
- Country: India
- Language: Malayalam

Eenam Thettaatha Kaattaaru is a 1989 Indian Malayalam film, directed by P. Vinod Kumar, starring Sukumaran and Jayalalita in the lead roles.

== Cast ==
- Sukumaran as Jayan
- Jayalalita as Neeli
- Cochin Haneefa as George
- Viji as Ponni
- Veena Sunder
- Ganesh Kumar as Rajesh
- Shanawas as Maruthan
- Hari as Kattumooppan
- Radha Devi

== Soundtrack ==
Music was by Navas Rahman, with lyrics by Poovachal Khader.

| No. | song | singer | lyrics | music |
|---|---|---|---|---|
| 1 | "Mallippoo Manamulla" | K. S. Chitra | Poovachal Khader | Navas Rahman |
| 2 | "Omale Anuragile" | K.J. Yesudas, | Poovachal Khader | Navas Rahman |
| 3 | "Thaipongal" | K. S. Chitra | Poovachal Khader | Navas Rahman |

== see the movie ==
- Eenam Thettatha Kattaru 1989
