= Soumya Bollapragada =

Indian actress

- Born: 26 June 1985 (age 41); Nagpur, India
- Occupations: Film actress; model; writer
- Years active: 2005–present
- Relatives: Gautami (aunt); U. G. Krishnamurti (great-grandfather)

Soumya Bollapragada is an Indian actress, writer, director and a model.

== Life and career ==
She is the niece of actress Gautami and great-granddaughter of the Indian thinker U. G. Krishnamurti and has acted in Telugu films primarily. She is also related to Nirmala Sitharaman through her mother. Soumya is also the rakhi sister (sworn sister) of Prince Manvendra Singh Gohil.

Her father Divakar was an engineer in the Merchant Navy, her mother a housewife. She graduated from St. Joseph's College for Women. She ran a monthly magazine Evoke for three and half years in Vizag. She has a bachelor's degree in English literature and Psychology from Andhra University She was one of the six finalists in Miss South India where girls from Karnataka, Kerala, Tamil Nadu and AP had participated. Soumya secured the Ms Photogenic and Ms Perfect 10 rounds in the contest. She had also won the Ms. Personality round for her height in the Miss Andhra contest held in Hyderabad in January 2005 and the Miss NIFD title organised by the National Institute of Fashion Design in Visakhapatnam in April 2005. She was trained by Koushik Ghosh for this pageant.

She has appeared in commercials for brands including KPL Coconut Oil in Kerala, Sun Flower Shopping Mall, and Anarkali Boutique.

She made her debut in the film The Angrez with her portrayal of the character Tanya garnering notice. She has a theatre background which helped her to get into the film industry. She also acted in Srikanth Iyengar's English film Stalemate and played the role of an assistant surgeon. She made her debut in Tamil in Thozha with the stars of Chennai 600028. She also played a role in Netru Indru Naalai (Ninna Nedu Repu in Telugu). She was part of Mugguru produced by Movie Mogul D Ramaniadu and directed by V N Aditya. She acted in the horror thriller Poga and in Ramadandu and played a journalist in the latter.

She is the founder of the theatre group Applause – The Theatre People. She has also hosted TV shows like Jollywood Express, a comedy show with actor AVS on Gemini TV and Zee Sound Party on Zee Telugu. She was the winner of the country-wide Lucky 13 contest held by author Ashwin Sanghi. In addition to this she has worked as a writer for Chhota Bheem, Mighty Raju, Arjun, Chimpoo Simpoo.

== Filmography ==
Year	Film	Role	Language	Notes
2005	The Angrez	Tanya	Hyderabadi Urdu	
2007	Stalemate		English	
2007	Aa Roje		Telugu	
2008	Thozha	Manisha Gupta	Tamil	
2008	Netru Indru Naalai	Neelu	Tamil	
2008	Ninna Nedu Repu	Neelu	Telugu	
2008	Call Center		Telugu	
2010	Young India	Keerthi	Telugu	
2011	Mugguru	Mohini	Telugu	
2012	Poga		Telugu	
2012	Ramadandu		Telugu	
2013	Neenandre Ishta Kano	Anjali	Kannada	credited as Roopanjali
2014	Chandamama Kathalu		Telugu	Special appearance
