= Madhumasam =

- Theatrical release poster
- Directed by: Chandra Siddhartha
- Written by: Chandra Siddhartha (screenplay); Sathyanand (dialogues); Balabhadrapatruni Ramani (novel)
- Produced by: D. Ramanaidu
- Starring: Sumanth; Sneha; Parvati Melton
- Cinematography: Sudhakar Reddy Yakkanti
- Edited by: Marthand K. Venkatesh
- Music by: Mani Sharma
- Production company: Suresh Productions
- Distributed by: Suresh Productions
- Release date: 9 February 2007
- Country: India
- Language: Telugu

Madhumasam (Telugu: మధుమాసం) is a 2007 Indian Telugu-language romantic drama film directed by Chandra Siddhartha. The film stars Sumanth, Sneha, and Parvati Melton in the lead roles. It was produced by D. Ramanaidu on Suresh Productions banner. Madhumasam released on 9 February 2007 to mixed reviews and was a hit at the box office, having a run of over 100 days in a few centres.

== Plot ==
Sanjay (Sumanth) is an extremely practical man who believes in nothing but logic and reasoning. Hamsa Vahini (Sneha) is the exact opposite of him. She is highly emotional and trusting. Hamsa, not knowing Sanjay's true nature, falls for him and wants to marry him. Sanjay accepts the proposal. In a casual chat right before their engagement, Sanjay reveals that he does not love her and that he is just marrying her, as it is the practical thing to do. This hurts Hamsa and she cancels the engagement. As time goes on, Sanjay starts missing Hamsa, to his own surprise. A heartbroken Hamsa, meanwhile, encounters further issues with her own family. She decides that it's in her best interest to become a person devoid of any emotions or bonds. She loses faith in love and relationships. Despite Sanjay's several attempts to change her back to her old self, she vehemently refuses. The rest of the story is depicts her acceptance of Sanjay's love.

== Cast ==
- Sumanth as Sanjay
- Sneha as Hamsa Vahini "Hamsa"
- Parvati Melton as Maya
- Chalapati Rao as Sanjay's father
- Kavitha as Sanjay's mother
- Giri Babu as Hamsa's father
- Naresh as Sanjay's uncle
- Surya as Hamsa's brother-in-law
- Sameer as Hamsa's elder brother
- Ahuti Prasad as Sanjays Uncle
- Venu Madhav as Dharmavarapu Subrahmanyam Nephew
- Dharmavarapu Subrahmanyam as Hamsas Boss
- L. B. Sriram as Hostel Watch man
- AVS as Doctor
- Kondavalasa as Maya's House owner
- Siva Reddy as Police Inspector
- Raavi Kondala Rao as Sanjay's Grandfather
- Ravi Babu as Maya's boss
- Ashmita Karnani as Hamsa's friend
- Rajitha as Nurse (Assistant to Doctor)
- Bangalore Padma as Hostel Warden
- Deepanjali
- Gundu Hanumantha Rao as Police constable
- Uttej as Sanjay's friend
- Seema as Mangathayaru 'Manga', Sanjay's cousin
- Suman Shetty
- Krishnudu as Sanjay's friend
- Venkat as Peter (Guest appearance)
- Baby Annie as a girl who teases with Sanjay to woo Hamsa (Uncredited role)

== Soundtrack ==
Madhumasam

Soundtrack album by Mani Sharma
- Released: 2007
- Recorded: 2007
- Genre: Feature film soundtrack
- Length: 27:36
- Label: Aditya Music
- Producer: Mani Sharma

Mani Sharma chronology
Room Mates (2006)	Madhumasam (2007)	Dubai Seenu (2007)
External audio
- Official Audio Jukebox on YouTube

Music was composed by Mani Sharma. Music was released by Aditya Music.

Track list
No.	Title	Lyrics	Singer(s)	Length
1.	"Devadasu Kanna"	Peddada Murthy	Karthik, Bhargavi	04:12
2.	"Valentine"	Chandra Bose	Rahul Nambiar, Rita	04:31
3.	"Promise Chestuvunna"	Peddada Murthy	Ranjit, Rita	04:48
4.	"Oohale"	Peddada Murthy	K. S. Chithra, Karthik	04:42
5.	"Oni Merupulu"	Suddhala Ashok Teja	Muralidhar, Ranjit, Jayadev	04:41
6.	"Vasantham"	Veturi	Ranjit, Rita	04:42
Total length:				27:36

== Reception ==
A critic from Rediff.com wrote that "With shades of Kyun...! Ho Gaya Na (Aishwarya Rai, Vivek Oberoi, Amitabh Bachchan), one wonders why the director made such a film which is not rivetting at all. One can almost predict what happens and the climax is rather hackneyed". A critic from Idlebrain.com wrote that "First half of the film is neat. Second half is stuffed with lot of melodrama and it appears boring, at times".

== Awards ==
- Balabhadrapatruni Ramani won Nandi Award for Best Story Writer (2007)
