= Aham Reboot =

2024 Indian Telugu-language film by Prashanth Sagar Atluri

- Release poster
- Directed by: Prashanth Sagar Atluri
- Screenplay by: Suma Karthikeya; Prashanth Sagar Atluri
- Story by: Prashanth Sagar Atluri
- Produced by: Sridhar Marisa
- Starring: Sumanth
- Cinematography: Varun Ankarla
- Edited by: Murali Krishna Manyam
- Music by: Sriram Maddury
- Production company: Vayuputra Entertainments
- Distributed by: Aha
- Release date: 30 June 2024
- Running time: 91 minutes
- Country: India
- Language: Telugu

Aham Reboot is a 2024 Indian Telugu-language techno thriller film co-written and directed by Prashanth Sagar Atluri. The film features Sumanth in lead role.

The film was released on 30 June 2024 on Aha.

== Cast ==
- Sumanth as RJ Nilay

== Music ==
All music is composed by Sriram Maddury.

Track list
No.	Title	Lyrics	Singer(s)	Length
1.	"The Fate Anthem"	Vidya Sagar	Sriram Maddury, Hilda Orvarsdottir	3:18
2.	"One For The Road"	Prashanth Sagar Atluri	Priyanka Gajanan	3:20

== Release ==
Aham Reboot was originally scheduled for a theatrical release, but had a direct-to-video release on 30 June 2024 on Aha.

== Reception ==
Avad Mohammed of OTTPlay gave a rating of 2 out of 5 and the film lacks "proper drama and arresting thrills".
