= Andari Bandhuvaya =

- DVD cover
- Directed by: Chandra Siddhartha
- Written by: Balabhadrapatruni Ramani
- Produced by: Chandra Siddhartha; V. Rama Krishna
- Starring: Sharwanand; Padmapriya
- Cinematography: Jaya Krishna Gummadi
- Edited by: Nandamuri Hari
- Music by: Anup Rubens
- Production companies: Filmotsav, Uthopia Entertainers
- Distributed by: Blue Sky
- Release date: 14 May 2010
- Running time: 150 minutes
- Country: India
- Language: Telugu

Andari Bandhuvaya (transl. Everyone's Relative) is a 2010 Telugu-language film. It received Akkineni Award for best home-viewing feature film for the year 2010. It was directed by Chandra Siddartha. The story and dialogues was written by popular Telugu novelist Balabhadrapatruni Ramani. It is a low budget movie which did well overseas. At box office it could not get good collections initially but it met slow success.

== Plot ==
Andari Bandhuvaya is a sincere attempt to highlight the importance of human values in today's society. Movie shows two types of environments starts with city shifts to village and then shifts to city. Nandu is simple man who helps and lives in simple manner, he watches all as his family members. Paddu belongs to a poor family and feeds her family with a normal job. She is optimistic and straight forward. Accidentally she visits hero's village. She watches values of village. Her behavior and conduct changes.

== Cast ==
- Sharwanand as Nandu
- Padmapriya as Paddu
- Naresh as Nandu's father
- Vijay Sai as Nandu's friend
- R. K. as Jangaiah
- Hari Teja as Paddu's elder sister
- M. S. Narayana
- Pragathi as Paddu's mother
- Priyanka Nalkari as Priyanka, Paddu's younger sister
- Aryan as NRI
- Surya
- Krishna Bhagawan
- Jeeva
- Anand

== Soundtrack ==
Andari Bandhuvaya

Soundtrack album by Anup Rubens
- Released: 2010
- Recorded: 2010
- Genre: Soundtrack
- Length: 26:57
- Label: T-Series
- Producer: Anup Rubens

Anup Rubens chronology
Seeta Ramula Kalyanam (2010)	Andari Bandhuvaya (2010)	Nenu Naa Rakshasi (2011)

The music was composed by Anup Rubens and released by T-Series. All lyrics were penned by Chaitanya Prasad. The song "Roju Roju Ninne" is based on "Big Pimpin'" by Jay-Z.

Track-List
No.	Title	Singer(s)	Length
1.	"Malli Malli Rammani"	Deepti Madhuri, Anup Rubens	3:14
2.	"Roju Roju Ninne"	Deepthi Madhuri, Anup Rubens, Sravani	3:56
3.	"Jigibigi Chilaka"	N. C. Karunya, Pranavi Acharya, Dilip, Noel Sean	4:59
4.	"Sooryudu Evarayya"	Amrutha Varshini, Sravani, Jai Srinivas, Anup Rubens, Aishwarya Dutt Sharma	4:01
5.	"Jama Chattuki Jamakayalu"	Sharwanand, Padmapriya	2:53
6.	"Malli Malli Rammani (Male)"	Anup Rubens	2:44
7.	"Nandamaya"	Sravana Bhargavi, Sreerama Chandra, Bhargavi	5:10
Total length:			26:57

== Awards ==
Nandi Award for Akkineni Award for Best Home-viewing Feature Film - Chandra Siddhartha
