= U. G. Krishnamurti =

Indian spiritual figure (1918–2007)

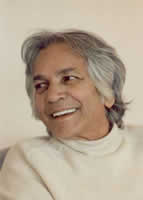
- Born: Uppaluri Gopala Krishnamurti; 9 July 1918; Machilipatnam, Madras Presidency, British India
- Died: 22 March 2007 (aged 88); Vallecrosia, Italy
- Occupation: Public speaker
- Children: 4

Education
- Education: University of Madras (BA)

Uppaluri Gopala Krishnamurti (9 July 1918 – 22 March 2007) was an Indian "anti-guru" who questioned the search for enlightenment. Having pursued a religious path in his youth and eventually rejecting it, U.G. clarified that he had experienced a devastating biological transformation on his 49th birthday, an event he referred to as "the calamity". He emphasized that this transformation back to "the natural state" is a rare, acausal, biological occurrence with no religious context. Because of this, he discouraged people from pursuing the "natural state" as a spiritual goal.

He rejected the basis of thought and in doing so negated all systems of thought and knowledge. Hence he explained his assertions were experiential and not speculative – "Tell them that there is nothing to understand."

He was unrelated to his contemporary Jiddu Krishnamurti, although the two men had a number of meetings because of their association with the Theosophical Society and U.G. has, at times, referred to him as "[his] teacher" in spite of having ultimately rejected his teachings as well as the idea that anything could or should be taught in any spiritual context.

== Biography ==
=== Early life ===
U.G. was born on 9 July 1918 in Machilipatnam, a town in coastal Andhra Pradesh, India, and raised in the nearby town of Gudivada. His mother died seven days after he was born, and he was brought up by his maternal grandfather, a wealthy Brahmin lawyer, who was also involved in the Theosophical Society. U.G. also became a member of the Theosophical Society during his teenage years and mentions having "inherited" his association with the Theosophical Society from his grandfather. South Indian actresses Gautami and Soumya Bollapragada are his very close relatives.

During the same period of his life, U.G. reportedly practised various austerities and sought moksha or liberation.

To that end, between the ages of 14 and 21, he undertook a variety of spiritual exercises, determined to find out whether moksha was possible. Wanting to achieve that state, he had also resolved to prove that if there were people who have thus "realized" themselves, they could not be hypocritical. (Note: U.G. carried on at some length – in practically every published work – about what he perceived as the hypocrisy of religious/spiritual people, his grandfather and other prominent Theosophists included.) As part of this endeavour, he searched for a person who was an embodiment of such "realization".

He spent seven summers in the Himalayas with Swami Sivananda studying yoga and practising meditation. (Note: U.G. would later also dismiss this period with Sivananda as a useless exercise.) During his 20s, U.G. began attending the University of Madras, studying psychology, philosophy, mysticism, and the sciences. He dropped out of the Master's program with the idea that the answers of the West – to what he considered were essential questions – were no better than those of the East.

=== Quest ===
In 1939, at age 21, U.G. met with known spiritual teacher Ramana Maharshi. U.G. related that he asked Ramana, "This thing called moksha, can you give it to me?" – to which Ramana Maharshi replied, "I can give it, but can you take it?". This answer completely altered U.G.'s perceptions of the "spiritual path" and its practitioners. Later, U.G. would say that Maharshi's answer – which he perceived as "arrogant" – put him "back on track".

In 1941, he began working for the Theosophical Society, in C.W. Leadbeater's library. (Note: Eventually, U.G. was elected Joint General Secretary of the Indian Section. His association with the Society lasted until the early-mid 1950s, see Mystique of Enlightenment.) Shortly after, he began an international lecture tour on behalf of the Society, visiting Norway, Belgium, Germany and the United States. Returning to India, he married a Brahmin woman named Kusuma Kumari in 1943, at age 25.

From 1947 to 1953, U.G. regularly attended talks given by Jiddu Krishnamurti in Madras, India, beginning a direct dialogue with him in 1953. (Note: U. G. Krishnamurti described one of their meetings as follows: "We really didn't get along well. Whenever we met we locked horns over some issue or other. For instance, I never shared his concern for the world, or his belief that his teaching would profoundly affect the thoughts and actions of mankind for the next five hundred years – a fantasy of the Theosophist occultists. In one of our meetings I told Krishnamurti, "I am not called upon to save the world." He asked, "The house is on fire – what will you do?" "Pour more gasoline on it and maybe something will rise from the ashes", I remarked. Krishnamurti said, "You are absolutely impossible". Then I said, "You are still a Theosophist. You have never freed yourself from the World Teacher role. There is a story in the Avadhuta Gita which talks of the avadhut who stopped at a wayside inn and was asked by the innkeeper, 'What is your teaching?' He replied, 'There is no teacher, no teaching and no one taught.' And then he walked away. You too repeat these phrases and yet you are so concerned with preserving your teaching for posterity in its pristine purity.") U.G. related that the two had almost daily discussions for a while, which he asserted were not providing satisfactory answers to his questions. Finally, their meetings came to a halt. He described part of the final discussion:

And then, towards the end, I insisted, "Come on, is there anything behind the abstractions you are throwing at me?" And that chappie said, "You have no way of knowing it for yourself". Finish – that was the end of our relationship, you see – "If I have no way of knowing it, you have no way of communicating it. What the hell are we doing? I've wasted seven years. Goodbye, I don't want to see you again". Then I walked out.

After the fallout with Jiddu Krishnamurti, U.G. continued travelling, still lecturing. At about the same time he states that he had been "puzzled" by the continuing appearance of certain psychic powers. In 1955, U.G. and his family went to the United States to seek medical treatment for his eldest son, and stayed there for five years.^{:1}

=== London period ===
He separated from his family and went to live in London. (Note: U.G. had earlier inherited a considerable – for the time – sum of money from his grandfather. While in the US for his son's treatments, he felt more clear and grounded into himself. See Mystique of Enlightenment.) While sitting one day in Hyde Park, he was confronted by a police officer who threatened to lock him up if he didn't leave the park. Down to his last five pence, he made his way to the Ramakrishna Mission of London where the residing Swami gave him money for a hotel room for the night. The following day, U.G. began working for the Ramakrishna Mission, an arrangement that lasted for three months. Before leaving the mission he left a letter for the residing Swamiji telling him that he had become a new man.^{:2}

About this time, Jiddu Krishnamurti was in London and the two Krishnamurtis renewed their acquaintance. Jiddu tried to advise U.G. on his recent marital troubles, but U.G. declined his help. Jiddu eventually persuaded him to attend a few talks he was giving in London, which U.G. did, but found himself bored listening to him.^{:3}

In 1961, U.G. put an end to his relationship with his wife. Their marriage had been a unhappy affair, and by that time he described himself as being "detached" from his family, emotionally as well as physically. He then left London and spent three months living in Paris, using funds he had obtained by selling his unused return ticket to India, during which time he ate a different variety of cheese each day. Down to his last 150 francs, he decided to go to Switzerland where he still had a small bank account. By mistake he went by train to Geneva, rather than Zurich, where the bank account was.

=== Early Swiss period ===
After two weeks in Geneva, U.G. was unable to pay his hotel bill and sought refuge at the Indian Consulate. He was listless, without hope, and described himself as "finished" – he requested that he be sent back to India, which the consular authorities refused to do at the state's expense. A consulate employee in her 60s named Valentine de Kerven offered U.G. shelter. Valentine and U.G. became good friends, and she provided him with a home in Switzerland.

For the next few years, the questions regarding the subject of enlightenment – or anything else – did not interest him, and he did nothing to further his enquiry. But by 1967, U.G. was again concerned with the subject of enlightenment, wanting to know what that state was, which sages such as Siddhārtha Gautama purportedly attained. Hearing that Jiddu Krishnamurti was giving a talk in Saanen, U.G. decided to attend. During the talk, Jiddu was describing the state and U.G. thought that it referred to himself. He explained it as follows:

When I Iistened to him, something funny happened to me – a peculiar kind of feeling that he was describing my state and not his state. Why did I want to know his state? He was describing something, some movements, some awareness, some silence – "In that silence there is no mind; there is action" – all kinds of things. So, I am in that state. What the hell have I been doing these 30 or 40 years, listening to all these people and struggling, wanting to understand his state or the state of somebody else, Buddha or Jesus? I am in that state. Now I am in that state. So, then I walked out of the tent and never looked back.

He continues:

Then – very strange – that question "What is that state?" transformed itself into another question "How do I know that I am in that state, the state of Buddha, the state I very much wanted and demanded from everybody? I am in that state, but how do I know?"

=== The Calamity ===
The next day U.G. was again pondering the question "How do I know I am in that state?" with no answer forthcoming. He later recounted that on suddenly realising the question had no answer, there was an unexpected physical, as well as psychological, reaction. It seemed to him like "a sudden 'explosion' inside, blasting, as it were, every cell, every nerve and every gland in my body." Afterwards, he started experiencing what he called "the calamity", a series of bizarre physiological transformations that took place over the course of a week, affecting each one of his senses, and finally resulting in a deathlike experience. He described it this way:

I call it "calamity" because from the point of view of one who thinks this is something fantastic, blissful and full of beatitude, love, or ecstasy, this is physical torture; this is a calamity from that point of view. Not a calamity to me but a calamity to those who have an image that something marvelous is going to happen.

Upon the eighth day:

Then, on the eighth day I was sitting on the sofa and suddenly there was an outburst of tremendous energy – tremendous energy shaking the whole body, and along with the body, the sofa, the chalet and the whole universe, as it were – shaking, vibrating. You can't create that movement at all. It was sudden. Whether it was coming from outside or inside, from below or above, I don't know – I couldn't locate the spot; it was all-over. It lasted for hours and hours. I couldn't bear it but there was nothing I could do to stop it; there was a total helplessness. This went on and on, day after day, day after day.

The energy that is operating there does not feel the limitations of the body; it is not interested; it has its own momentum. It is a very painful thing. It is not that ecstatic, blissful beatitude and all that rubbish – stuff and nonsense! – it is really a painful thing.

U.G. could not, and did not, explain the provenance of the calamity experiences. In response to questions, he maintained that it happened "in spite of" his pre-occupation with – and search for – enlightenment. He also maintained that the calamity had nothing to do with his life up to that point, or with his upbringing. Several times he described the calamity happening to him as a matter of chance, and he insisted that he could not possibly, in any way, impart that experience to anybody else.

=== Post-calamity ===
According to U.G., his life-story can be separated into the pre- and post-calamity parts. Describing his post-calamity life, he stated that he was functioning permanently in what he called "the natural state": A state of spontaneous, purely physical, sensory existence, characterised by discontinuity – though not absence – of thought. U.G. also maintained that upon finding himself in the "natural state", he had lost all acquired knowledge and memories, and had to re-learn everything, as if "...the slate had been wiped clean".

After his calamity experience, U.G. often traveled to countries around the world, declining to hold formal discussions yet talking freely to visitors and those that sought him out. He gave his only formal post-calamity public talk in India, in 1972.

Nagaraj who was sitting quietly all this time said, "U.G., what exactly are you trying to put across?" U.G. replied, "Depends on you, not on me. This you don't seem to understand. You are the only medium through which I can express myself."

=== Death ===
On 22 March 2007, U.G. died at Vallecrosia in Italy. He had slipped and injured himself and was bedridden for seven weeks before his death. Three friends, including long-time devotee Mahesh Bhatt, were in the city with him when he died. Mahesh states in his biography of U.G., "U.G. Krishnamurti, A Life", that U.G. died alone after Mahesh and those present went out for a brief walk with the specific intention of allowing U.G. some moments of solitude to die in peace. In February 2007, he had dictated his final speech, "My Swan Song".

U.G. had asked that no rituals or funeral rites be conducted upon his death; also, he did not leave instructions on how to dispose of his body. His body was cremated by Bhatt the next day. True to his own philosophy, U.G. did not want to be remembered after his death.

== Health ==
U.G. was known for his unusual health and diet preferences. Carrying with him a "portable kitchen" in a tiny suitcase throughout his travels, he consumed a great deal of salt and cream, and stated "no meal should take longer than a few minutes to prepare." After 1949, U.G. never saw a doctor or took medication, believing the body would take care of itself. Often complimented for good looks in his old age, U.G. would respond "that's because I don't eat healthy food, I don't take vitamins, and I don't exercise!"

== No teaching ==
U.G. emphasised the impossibility and non-necessity of any human change, radical or mundane. These assertions, he stated, cannot be considered as a "teaching", that is, something intended to be used to bring about a change. He insisted that the body and its actions are already perfect, and he considered attempts to change or mould the body as violations of the peace and the harmony that is already there:

I have no teaching. There is nothing to preserve. Teaching implies something that can be used to bring about change. Sorry, there is no teaching here, just disjointed, disconnected sentences. What is there is only your interpretation, nothing else. For this reason there is not now nor will there ever be any kind of copyright for whatever I am saying. I have no claims.

U.G. maintained that the reason people came to him (and to gurus) was to find solutions for their everyday real problems, and/or for solutions to a fabricated problem, namely, the search for spirituality and enlightenment. He insisted that this search is caused by the cultural environment, which demands conformity of individuals as it simultaneously places within them the desire to be special – the achievement of enlightenment thus viewed as a crowning expression of an individual's "specialness" and uniqueness. Consequently, the desire for enlightenment is exploited by gurus, spiritual teachers, and other "sellers of shoddy goods", who pretend to offer various ways to reach that goal. According to U.G., all these facilitators never deliver, and cannot ever deliver, since the goal itself (i.e. enlightenment), is unreachable.

The self, as he perceived, is an illusory entity projected by thought and sustained by the "demand" to bring about change in the world, in itself, or in both. According to U.G., the self-consciousness or "I" in human beings is born out of the need to give oneself continuity through the constant utilisation of thought. When this continuity is broken, even for a split second, its hold on the body is broken and the body falls into its natural rhythm. Thought also falls into its natural place – then it can no longer interfere or influence the working of the human body. In the absence of any continuity, the arising thoughts combust. According to U.G., "The so called self-realization is the discovery for yourself and by yourself that there is no self to discover. That will be a very shocking thing because it's going to blast every nerve, every cell, even the cells in the marrow of your bones."

Likewise, U.G. rejected the notion of a knower by turning the epistemological cornerstone "Cogito, ergo sum" by Descartes on its head, postulating that there is no one thinking, there is just thinking. He went one step further in his statement: "What is there is about thought but not thought itself." Furthermore, human self-consciousness is not a thing, but a movement, one characterised by "perpetual malcontent" and a "fascist insistence" on its own importance and survival.

While U.G. denied the existence of an individual mind he accepted the concept of a world mind, which according to him contained the accumulation of the totality of man's knowledge and experience. He also used "thought sphere" (atmosphere of thoughts) synonymously with the term "world mind". He stated that human beings inhabit this thought realm or thought sphere and that the human brain acts like an antenna, picking and choosing thoughts according to its needs.

== Selected publications ==
- The Courage to Stand Alone: Conversations with U.G. Krishnamurti, 2001, Smriti Books. ISBN 81-87967-06-4
- The Mystique of Enlightenment: The Radical Ideas of U.G. Krishnamurti, 2002, Sentient Publications. ISBN 0-9710786-1-0, 81-87967-09-9
- Thought is Your Enemy: Conversations with U.G. Krishnamurti, 2002, Smriti Books. ISBN 81-87967-11-0
- The Little Book of Questions, 2003, Penguin Books. ISBN 0-14-029938-6
- Mind Is a Myth: Conversations with U.G. Krishnamurti, 2003, Smriti Books. ISBN 81-87967-10-2
- No Way Out: Conversations with U.G. Krishnamurti, 2005, Smriti Books. ISBN 81-87967-08-0
- The Natural State, In the words of U.G. Krishnamurti, 2005, Smriti Books. ISBN 81-87967-77-3

== Reception ==
His unorthodox non-message philosophy and the uncompromising, direct style of its presentation, generated a measure of notoriety and sharply-divided opinions. At the extremes, some people considered him enlightened, while others considered him nothing more than a charlatan. The clamour increased as books and articles about U.G. and his newly expounded philosophy continued appearing.

== In popular culture ==
Filmmaker Jane Campion, who knew Krishnamurti personally, modeled the character "G.J."—an enigmatic, anti-spiritual guru played by Holly Hunter in Campion's 2013 television miniseries Top of the Lake—directly on U.G..

In September 2026, the feature documentary The Natural State, directed by Matthew Dougherty and executive produced by Campion and Indian filmmaker Mahesh Bhatt (who wrote three books about U.G.), premiered at the Telluride Film Festival. Constructed from hundreds of hours of unseen archival home video and private journals recorded by New York photographer Julie Thayer beginning in the Swiss Alps in 1989, the film chronicles Thayer's psychological entanglement with U.G. alongside his biography and rivalry with Jiddu Krishnamurti.

== See also ==
- Myth of Progress
- Nihilism
- Skepticism

== Sources ==
- Bhatt, Mahesh (1992). U.G. Krishnamurti, a Life. Viking. ISBN 9780140126204.
- Braak, Andre van de (2016). Enlightenment Blues. Monkfish Book Publishing.
- Jones, Constance A.; Ryan, James D. (2007). Encyclopedia of Hinduism. Facts On File, Inc. ISBN 978-0-8160-5458-9.
- Mehrotra, Rajiv (2009). The Mind of the Guru. Hay House.
- Rao, Mukunda (2022). India's Greatest Minds: Spiritual Masters, Philosophers, Reformers. Hachette UK.
