= Idam Jagath =

2018 Indian Telugu-language film

- Film poster
- Directed by: Anil Srikantam
- Produced by: Jonnalagadda Padmavate; Sreedhar
- Starring: Sumanth; Anju Kurian
- Cinematography: P. Bal Reddy
- Edited by: Garry BH
- Music by: Sricharan Pakala
- Production companies: H Viraat Films; Sri Vignesh Karthik Cinemas
- Release date: 28 December 2018
- Country: India
- Language: Telugu

Idam Jagath (transl. This World) is a 2018 Indian Telugu language film directed by Anil Srikantam and starring Sumanth and Anju Kurian.

== Plot ==
Nishith Vidyadhar is accused of being a cheater, selfish, and dangerous by Mahati, Anand, and Rajiv. He is arrested by the police for jogging late at night due to insomnia, but it is later revealed that he has a sleeping disorder called Delayed Sleep Phase Disorder (DSPD), which causes him to stay awake late into the night and sleep late into the morning. The doctor explains that this condition, though seemingly small, can lead to financial and psychological problems if left untreated. After a series of events, he decides to become a night reporter and shoot crime cases. He somehow manages to steal a walkie talkie of the Police to get information on crimes. He, along with his friend Anand, shoots some crime incidents and earns money by selling the footage to a local news channel.

Later, Nishith falls for a teacher, Mahiti. However, he conceals his profession due to Mahiti's aversion to night reporters. Things take a dark turn when Nishith captures footage of a murder, only to discover that the victim is Mahati's father. As the police interrogate Nishith and his friend Anand about a murder at the airport, they maintain their innocence, claiming they arrived after the incident. Yet, when pressed for the footage they captured, the authorities request their presence at the station for further investigation. Through deduction, Nishith concludes that Kalyan Tripathi, the brother of businessman Sahu Tripathi, is implicated in both Mahati's father's and the Minister's son's murders, based on identifying a distinctive tattoo on the car driver seen in the footage. Kalyan tries to kill Nishith as well but fails.

Meanwhile, Kalyan is seen seeking an election ticket from the ruling party. Elsewhere, Nishith is trying to sell a big news story to the channel's editor for one million rupees, promising exclusive access to the story. The editor Rajiv is hesitant to pay such a high price but acknowledges the potential impact of the story on the channel's TRPs.

Nishith surprises Mahiti with a birthday gift, and they confess their love to each other. Later, Nishith and Anand follow Kalyan's car and reach a coal mine. The minister is in a conversation with Sahu, unveiling their partnership in illicit activities, camouflaged under Tripathi Coal Exports and Imports. Expressing remorse over the predicament, the minister declares his intention to sever ties publicly in a press conference the following day, signaling the termination of their partnership. Sahu confides in the minister, admitting to orchestrating his son's death to secure a seat for Kalyan. Subsequently, Sahu kills the minister.

Nishith captures the scene on camera and attempts to seek help from a police officer, only to discover the officer is in league with Sahu. In a desperate bid to flee, Nishith loses the camera to Sahu. Meanwhile, Mahiti arrives at Nishith's residence, learning of his presence during her father's tragic demise and his decision to film rather than intervene. Disillusioned, Mahiti decides to part ways with Nishith. Amidst the chaos, Kalyan arrives, and a fight ensues with Sahu's henchmen, leading to Nishith, Mahiti, and Anand escaping. Mahiti, feeling betrayed, accuses Nishith of being driven by greed, even profiting from death. As Nishith confronts the corrupt police officer, he is apprehended and handed over to Sahu's custody.

Sahu discloses to Nishith that Mahati's father, initially their watchman, discovered their drug dealings and resorted to blackmail for financial gain so Kalyan ended Sudhakar's life. Using his cunning ways, Nishith traps Sahu, Kalyan, and the complicit police officer. Amidst the chaos, Sahu kills the police officer. In a turn of events, Sahu and Kalyan are killed by Nishith. Nishith gives this news to Rajiv and is arrested.

The public erupts in fury upon discovering the arrest of the individual who killed criminals. During the police inquiry, Nishith asserts that his actions were in self-defense, leading to his release from custody. Mahiti extends forgiveness and reconciliation towards Nishith. Reflecting on his actions, Nishith expresses remorse while acknowledging his complex nature. He vows to destroy anyone who crosses his path.

== Cast ==
- Sumanth as Nishith Vidyadhar
- Anju Kurian as Mahati
- Satya as Anand
- Adithya as Dr. Sravan
- Vinay Varma as Vikram Simha
- Priyadarshini Ram as Rajeev
- Vamshi as Vamshi
- Kalyan Vitappu as Kalyan Tripati
- Gokul as Narendra Prasad
- Sivaji Raja as Police officer
- Appaji Ambarisha Darbha as Mahati's father

== Production ==
The film is loosely inspired by Nightcrawler (2014) starring Jake Gyllenhaal. The film's title is derived from a dialogue spoken by Tottempudi Gopichand, from Goutham Nanda (2017).

== Soundtrack ==
Sricharan Pakala composed the songs for the film.

- Dooraale - Yamini Ghantasala, Raviprakash Chodimala
- Manase - Yamini Ghantasala (written by VNV Ramesh)

== Reception ==
The Times of India gave the film two out of five stars and wrote that "Sumanth's act as a man with sketchy ethics is the only thing making this worth it". Similarly, The Hindu wrote, "Barring Sumanth, who gets a role that gives him ample scope to shine, the other characters and performances have nothing much to write about".
