= Boss (2006 film) =

- Theatrical release poster
- Directed by: V. N. Aditya
- Written by: Chintapally Ramana (dialogues)
- Screenplay by: V. N. Aditya
- Story by: V. N. Aditya; Balabhadrapatruni Ramani
- Produced by: D. Siva Prasad Reddy
- Starring: Nagarjuna Akkineni; Nayanthara; Poonam Bajwa
- Cinematography: J. Siva Kumar
- Edited by: Marthand K. Venkatesh
- Music by: Songs: Kalyani Malik; Harry Anand; Score: Anup Rubens
- Production company: Kamakshi Movies
- Release date: 27 September 2006
- Running time: 160 minutes
- Country: India
- Language: Telugu

Boss is a 2006 Indian Telugu-language romantic action film directed by V. N. Aditya and produced by D. Siva Prasad Reddy on Kamakshi Movies banner. The film stars Nagarjuna, Nayanthara and Poonam Bajwa with Shriya Saran in a special appearance. Music for the film was composed by Kalyani Malik, Harry Anand, and Anoop Rubens. Cinematography for the film was handled by J. Siva Kumar and editing by Marthand K. Venkatesh. The film was released on 27 September 2006 and was commercially unsuccessful. The film was dubbed into Tamil and Malayalam with the same title and into Hindi as Yeh Kaisa Karz (2008).

== Plot ==
SRK, a ruthless real estate contractor, uses muscle power to encroach on land and expand his business. His rival, Gopala Krishna (GK), the influential head of GK Constructions, dominates both the real estate sector and the underworld. Seeking a personal secretary, GK interviews several MBA graduates but finds none suitable. He accidentally meets Anuradha (Anu) and hires her for the role. Though strict with his staff, GK also cares for them.

During a business trip to Malaysia, Anu and GK grow close, and she falls in love with him. However, before she can confess her feelings, she becomes involved in a minor issue that provokes GK’s anger, leading her to resign. As she serves her notice period, GK resumes his search for a secretary and hires Sruthi, unaware that she has been planted by SRK. Sruthi, desperate to free her father, Ramamurthy, from a false case, steals an important tender file but refuses to hand it over until SRK secures her father’s release. When SRK betrays her, she attempts to flee but is rescued by GK at Anu’s insistence. In the ensuing attack, Anu is injured but ensures the tender is submitted on time, saving GK from a major loss.

As GK prepares to thank her, Anu confesses her love, only for him to reveal his past. He was married to Sanjana, who died in a tsunami shortly after their wedding. Though he has feelings for Anu, he refuses her love, unable to replace Sanjana. He also reveals that Sruthi was originally hired to assist Anu. Meanwhile, Sanjana’s mother, Sumitra, dies in Malaysia, and her husband, Viswanath, expresses her last wish—that GK marry Anu. Over time, GK realises his love for Anu. He returns to India, but SRK’s men attack him, leaving him injured. Despite this, he stops Anu’s wedding and unites with her.

== Cast ==
- Nagarjuna Akkineni as Gopala Krishna / GK
  - Sajja Teja as Young GK
- Nayanthara as Anuradha / Anu
  - Baby Nishiptha as Young Anu
- Poonam Bajwa as Sruthi
- Sayaji Shinde as SRK
- Nassar as Viswanath, Sanjana's father
- Brahmanandam as Abhay
- Sunil as Sunil
- Ali as Nagarjunasagar
- Dharmavarapu Subramanyam as Chari
- Giri Babu as Rama Chandra Murthy
- Chandra Mohan as Chandram
- Tanikella Bharani as Anuradha's father
- M. S. Narayana as Narayana
- Venu Madhav as Venu
- Raghu Babu as Raghu
- Ananth Babu
- Kondavalasa
- Raghunatha Reddy
- Malladi Raghava
- Ashok Kumar
- Chitti
- Sumalatha as Sanjana's mother
- Hema as SRK's wife
- Rajitha
- Lahari
- Devisri
- Ooma
- Ooma Chowdary
- Revathi
- Ravali
- Keerthi
- Dolly
- Saloni Aswani in item song Nachindhi Chesey
- Shriya Saran as Sanjana (Guest appearance)
- Nicolette Bird in item song Naa Kallu Vaale

== Soundtrack ==
Boss

Soundtrack album by Kalyani Malik
- Released: 2006
- Recorded: 2006
- Genre: Soundtrack
- Length: 34:07
- Label: Aditya Music
- Producer: Kalyani Malik

Kalyani Malik chronology
Andhrudu (2005)	Boss (2006)	Ashta Chemma (2007)

Anup Rubens chronology
Veedhi (2006)	Boss (2006)	Veduka (2007)

Music was composed by Kalyani Malik, Harry Anand, and Anup Rubens. Audio soundtrack was released on Aditya Music. In an audio review, Sandeep Reddy of Idlebrain.com wrote, "To cut a long story short, Kalyani Malik and Harry Anand satisfy Nag’s fans with songs that are a right mix of class n mass. Almost all the songs are catchy and make a good impression in the very first hearing".

Track-List
No.	Title	Lyrics	Music	Singer(s)	Length
1.	"Nachindhi Chesey"	Chandrabose	Harry Anand	Hemachandra	4:36
2.	"Yedho Thamashagaa"	Sahithi	Kalyani Malik	Nihal, Sunitha	4:21
3.	"Naa Kallu Valle"	Chandrabose	Harry Anand	Tippu, Sunitha, Sumangali	4:20
4.	"Andagadu Muttukunte"	Chandrabose	Kalyani Malik	KK, Sunitha	4:55
5.	"Hello Baasu"	Sahithi	Kalyani Malik	Tippu, Gayatri	4:01
6.	"Anaganaganaga"	Chandrabose	Kalyani Malik	KK, Sunitha	4:29
7.	"Veluthunna"	Chandrabose	Kalyani Malik	KK, Sunitha	4:37
8.	"Boss I Love You" (Instrumental)		Anup Rubens		2:35
Total length:					34:07

== Reception ==
Jeevi of Idlebrain.com rated the film 3.25 out of 5. Radhika Rajamani of Rediff.com rated the film 2.5 out of 5 stars and wrote, "If you are looking for something out of the ordinary, you may be disappointed. But, if you like breezy love stories, you may enjoy this one as Nagarjuna and Nayantara light up the screen".
