= Balabhadrapatruni Ramani =

Indian writer (born 1964)

- Born: Ramani Ankaraju; 26 January 1965 (age 61); Hyderabad, India
- Known for: Literature

Balabhadrapatruni Ramani is an Indian litterateur, novelist, playwright, screenwriter, dialogue writer, and film critic, known for her works in Telugu theatre, Telugu cinema, Television, and Radio. She has served as a Jury Member for Southern Region II at the 66th National Film Awards.

== Early life and education ==
Ramani Balabhadrapatruni was born Ramani Ankaraju on 26 January 1964 in Hyderabad, India to Ankaraju Anand Bhushan Rao and Ankaraju Sathyavathi Devi. She got her Bachelor of Arts degree in 1985 from Kasturba Gandhi College in Secunderabad.

== Novelist ==
- Leader
- Mogude Rendo Priyudu
- Swargam Lo Khaidelu
- Repalle Lo Radha
- Aa Okkati Adigesey
- Evare Athagadu
- Preminchaka Emaindante
- Neeku naku madhya
- Alinganam
- Aunante Kaadanta
- Neeku Naaku Madhya
- Andari Bandhuvaya
- Khajuraho
- Edee Ninnati Swapnam

== Selected filmography ==
=== As storywriter, screenwriter and dialogue writer ===
- Hello Brother (1994 Telugu film)
- Anaganaga Oka Ammai (1999)
- Repallelo Radha (2001)
- Evare Athagadu (2003)
- Boss (2006)
- Madhumasam (2007)
- Rainbow (2008)
- Oh My God (2008)
- Andari Bandhuvaya (2010)
- Pattudhala (2013)
- Mrs. Subbalakshmi (2019)

=== Television, theatre and radio ===
Name	Type	Location
Gaaju Bharinaa	Play	All India Radio
Pelli Sandadi	Play	All India Radio
Gunde Gudaindhi	Play	All India Radio
Tulasi Dalam (Dialogues)	Serial	Gemini TV
Antarmukham (Dialogues	Serial	Citi Cable
Kalakanidi (Dialogues)	Serial	Zee Telugu
Sthri Naizam	Telefilm	Eenadu TV
Chudu Chudu Tamasha	Telefilm	Eenadu TV
Elavelupu (Lyrics)	Song	Gemini
Anuhya (Dialogues and Story)	Serial	Eenadu TV
Angi Sakshi (Dialogues and Story)	Serial	Eenadu TV
Padmavyuham	Daily Serial	Eenadu TV
Cheli	Daily Serial	Eenadu TV
Kalakanidi	Daily Serial	Zee Telugu
Turpuvelle Railu	Daily Serial	Eenadu TV
Madhumasam (2007)	Movie	
Repalle Lo Radha (2001)	Movie	
Evare Atagadu (2003)	Movie	
Anaganaga O Ammayi (1999)	Movie	
Rainbow (2008)	Movie	
Andari Bandhuvaya (2010)	Movie	
Boss (2006) (Co-author)	Movie	

== Awards and honors ==
Year	Awards and Honors
1994	Muddu- Andhra Bhoomi
1995	Athma Kadha – Andhra Bhoomi
1997	Anantham- Andhra Bhoomi
1997	Mosam- Andha Bhoomi
2006	Nava Sahithi Kotipati Chandramma
2007	Nandi Award for Best Story Writer - Madhumasam
2007	Nemallikanti Mahalaxmi Amma Award – Yedhanapudi Sulochana Rani
2008	Best Lady Award for Madhumasam story by Abhinandana for Women's day
	Best dialogue writer— for Agni Sakshi by Yuva Kala Vahini
	Durgabai Deshmukh Award – Abhinandana Cultural Organization
	Best story writer by Vamsi Directors for Repalle lo Radha
	Award by Rajalaksmi Foundation in New Jersey for Nanu Ardham Chesuko
