= Anaganaga (film) =

2025 Indian Telugu-language film by Sunny Sanjay

- Release poster
- Directed by: Sunny Sanjay
- Written by: Sunny Sanjay
- Based on: Ekda Kaay Zala by Saleel Kulkarni
- Produced by: Rakesh Reddy Gadam; Rudradev Madireddy
- Starring: Sumanth; Kajal Choudhary; Viharsh
- Cinematography: Pavan Kumar Pappula
- Edited by: Venkatesh Chunduru
- Music by: Chandu Ravi
- Production company: Krishi Entertainments
- Distributed by: ETV Win
- Release date: 15 May 2025
- Running time: 136 minutes
- Country: India
- Language: Telugu

Anaganaga (transl. Once upon a time) is a 2025 Indian Telugu-language family drama film written and directed by Sunny Sanjay. The film stars Sumanth, Kajal Choudhary, and Viharsh in the lead roles. It is loosely adapted from the 2022 Marathi film Ekda Kaay Zala.

The film was released directly on the ETV Win on 15 May 2025.

== Plot ==
Anaganaga follows Vyas, a school teacher who strongly believes in the power of storytelling as a teaching method. His unconventional style clashes with the traditional, rank-focused approach of the corporate school where he works. His wife, Bhagi, is the school principal.

When their son Ram and some other students perform poorly in exams, Vyas is blamed and fired. Although humiliated, he is determined to prove that education is more than just grades. He starts his own school for struggling students, focusing on understanding and creativity.

Vyas faces financial struggles, social skepticism, and even resistance from Bhagi, who initially supports conventional education for their son. Through his innovative teaching, Vyas gradually helps his students thrive. The film explores the deep bond between Vyas and Ram, as well as Vyas's unwavering faith in his teaching philosophy despite many challenges.

== Cast ==
- Sumanth as Vyas Kumar
- Kajal Choudhary as Bhagyalakshmi "Bhagi"
- Viharsh as Ram
- Srinivas Avasarala as Raja Reddy
- Anu Hasan as Rani Amma
- Rakesh Rachakonda as Batta Ravi
- B. V. S. Ravi as Narasimha Pathruni, Andhra Pradesh Education Minister
- Kaumudi Nemani as Doctor
- Shiva Kandukuri as Adult Ram (cameo appearance)
- Akhil Bhaneswar as Nanakutten Pillai (Malayali Science Teacher)

== Music ==
All lyrics are written by Rahman; all music is composed by Chandu Ravi.

No.	Title	Singer(s)	Length
1.	"Chudu Chudu"	Vijay Yesudas	3:42
2.	"Chikkuru Chikku"	Sai Veda Vagdevi, Pradhanya, Manoghna, Tanishka	4:10

== Release ==
Anaganaga was released directly on ETV Win on 15 May 2025. It was originally scheduled for release on 8 May 2025 but was postponed.

== Reception ==
Praising Sumanth's performance, Sangeetha Devi Dundoo of The Hindu and stated, "Anaganaga may follow a familiar arc, but it makes its point with grace. It celebrates storytelling not just as a teaching tool but as a way of healing, connecting, and remembering what really matters". Avad Mohammad of OTTPlay rated the film 3 out of 5 and opined that "Anaganaga also gives a solid message about how parents are forcing their kids into studies and are stopping them from being creative". India Today too gave the same rating and opined, "Sunny Sanjay deserves credit for penning such an insightful story, tastefully garnished with emotion". Asianet News Telugu also gave a positive review with particular praise for Sumanth's performance and direction.
