= Nenunnanu =

- DVD Cover
- Directed by: V. N. Aditya
- Written by: Paruchuri Brothers (dialogues)
- Screenplay by: V. N. Aditya
- Story by: Bhupathi Raja
- Produced by: D. Sivaprasad Reddy
- Starring: Nagarjuna Akkineni; Shriya Saran; Aarthi Agarwal; Mukesh Rishi; Subbaraju
- Cinematography: J. Siva Kumar
- Edited by: Marthand K. Venkatesh
- Music by: M. M. Keeravani
- Production company: Kamakshi Movies
- Release date: 6 April 2004
- Running time: 153 minutes
- Country: India
- Language: Telugu

Nenunnanu (transl. I Am There) is a 2004 Indian Telugu-language romantic comedy filmdirected by V. N. Aditya, and produced by D.Sivaprasad Reddy under the Kamakshi Movies banner. The film starred Nagarjuna Akkineni, Aarthi Agarwal and Shriya Saran, with Mukesh Rishi and Subbaraju in supporting roles and music by M. M. Keeravani.

Nenunnanu was released on 6 April 2004 and became a commercial blockbuster.

== Plot ==
Venu is an orphan and a contractor at Vizag port. Anu is a student in classical singing. Sruthi is Anu's friend. Anu makes an attempt to elope with her boyfriend Arun. Arun is the son of business tycoon JP. JP sends police across to nab Anu. As police nab Arun, Venu rescues Anu. Anu's father disassociates himself from his daughter. Then Venu takes Anu to his place and gives assurance. Venu finds out where Arun is and gets Anu married to him. JP tells his son that Venu and Anu have an affair as they live together in the same house. Arun gets suspicious about Anu's character and leaves the marriage venue immediately after the marriage. Anu is back in Venu's place. Venu is in the mission of locating Arun and convince him to come back to Anu. As Anu and Venu spend more time together, they get closer. Venu never takes advantage of it and treats Anu like a good friend. Anu pines for Arun but learns that Arun will marry the Minister's daughter. Venu goes to the engagement venue and tries to stop Arun from getting engaged. Anu comes and slaps Arun, saying that their marriage is over. She goes for a singing competition with Venu accompanying her. She wins the competition as well as her father's love. Arun, meanwhile tries to kill Venu but accidentally gets an electric shock. He gets paralysed for life. JP seeks revenge. Sruthi falls for Venu. Anu goes back to her father's house and now, being unmarried, thinks over her relationship with Venu. She realises that she loves Venu. Venu, too, reveals among his friends that he loves Anu, but will never tell her. Sruthi overhears both Anu and Venu's feelings and decides to sacrifice her love for Venu. Her parents decide to get her married to Venu. Sruthi refuses to marry Venu and tells them everything. Sruthi's mother gets angry and asks Anu to arrange her daughter's and Venu's wedding. Anu gets heartbroken but thinks that it's better for everyone. Sruthi goes to Venu and tells him that Anu, too, loves him. Anu is kidnapped by JP and his goons.

Venu goes to save Anu. After a big fight, he is able to defeat JP and save Anu, but Anu is stabbed. Sruthi comes and she takes Anu to the hospital. Venu comes to the hospital later. Anu asks the doctors to allow her to meet Venu before treating her. Anu and Venu confess their love for each other. Anu is successfully operated upon and finally united with Venu, with everyone's, including Sruthi's mother's, wishes. Then Venu marries Anu and lives happily ever after.

== Cast ==
- Nagarjuna Akkineni as Venu Madhav "Venu"
- Aanand Vardhan as Young Venu
- Aarthi Agarwal as Sruthi
- Shriya Saran as Anuradha “Anu”
- Mukesh Rishi as Jaya Prasad “JP”
- Subbaraju as Arun
- Brahmanandam as Manmadha Rao
- Ali as Kamal Hassan
- Sunil as Tip Sundaram
- Tanikella Bharani as Simhachalam Naidu
- Suhasini Maniratnam as Snehalatha, Venu's mother
- Sarath Babu as Shankar Rao, Venu's father
- Paruchuri Venkateswara Rao as Venkatachalam, Sruthi's father
- Giri Babu as Rama Chandra Murthy, Annu's father
- Sudha as Lakshmi, Annu's mother
- Siva Parvathi as Parvathi, Sruthi's mother
- Dharmavarapu Subramanyam as Music School Principal
- Ravi Babu as Walter, Ravi
- Siva Reddy as Shiva, Venu's friend
- Pasupathy as Veeran JP's henchman
- M. S. Narayana as Narayana
- Jenny as Devadinam
- Kaushal Manda as Rajesh
- Ananth
- Hema Sundar
- Naidu Gopi
- Neharika
- Likhitha Yamini
- Swathi
- Deepthi
- Dolly
- Baby Sri Vibha as Young Sruthi
- Baby Nishiptha as Young Anu
- Anita Hassanandani as special appearance in the Song "Ryali Ravulupadu"

== Soundtrack ==
Nenunnanu

Soundtrack album by M. M. Keeravani
- Released: 2004
- Genre: Soundtrack
- Length: 33:32
- Label: Aditya Music
- Producer: M. M. Keeravani

M. M. Keeravani chronology
Maa Alludu Very Good (2003)	Nenunnanu (2004)	Swamy (2004)

The music was composed by M. M. Keeravani. Music was released on ADITYA Music Company.

No.	Title	Lyrics	Singer(s)	Length
1.	"Ettago Unnadi"	Seetarama Sastry	K. S. Chithra, Tippu	4:51
2.	"E Shwasalo"	Seetarama Sastry	K. S. Chithra	5:08
3.	"Nee Kosam"	Seetarama Sasty	KK, Shreya Ghoshal	5:30
4.	"Nenunnanani"	Chandrabose	M. M. Keeravani, Sunitha	3:31
5.	"Ryali Ravulupadu"	Chandrabose	Tippu, Sunitha	5:33
6.	"Intha Dhooram"	Chandrabose	Tippu, Shreya Ghoshal	4:33
7.	"Nuziveedu"	Chandrabose	Arnod Chakravarthy, Shreya Ghoshal	4:20
Total length:				33:32

== Reception ==
Jeevi of Idlebrain wrote that "The plus points of the film are Nagarjuna and music by Keeravani. The main drawback of the film is incoherent script and loose screenplay". Sify opined that "But at the end of Nenuannu the audience leave whining evanu unnaru". Mithun Verma of Full Hyderabad wrote that "Nenunnanu is completely a commercial venture - violence and songs for the masses; sentiment and emotion for the ladies; romance for the youth; comedy for the kids; The only element missing is a magic wand to make all of the above look jointed rather than disjointed". Rakesh P. of Deccan Herald wrote "The movie has all the ingredients. But its execution is what makes you weep. Beset by a familiar plot and a narrative style that lacks intensity, Nagarjuna finds it difficult to convince us we get our money’s worth".
