= V. N. Aditya =

Indian film director and screen writer

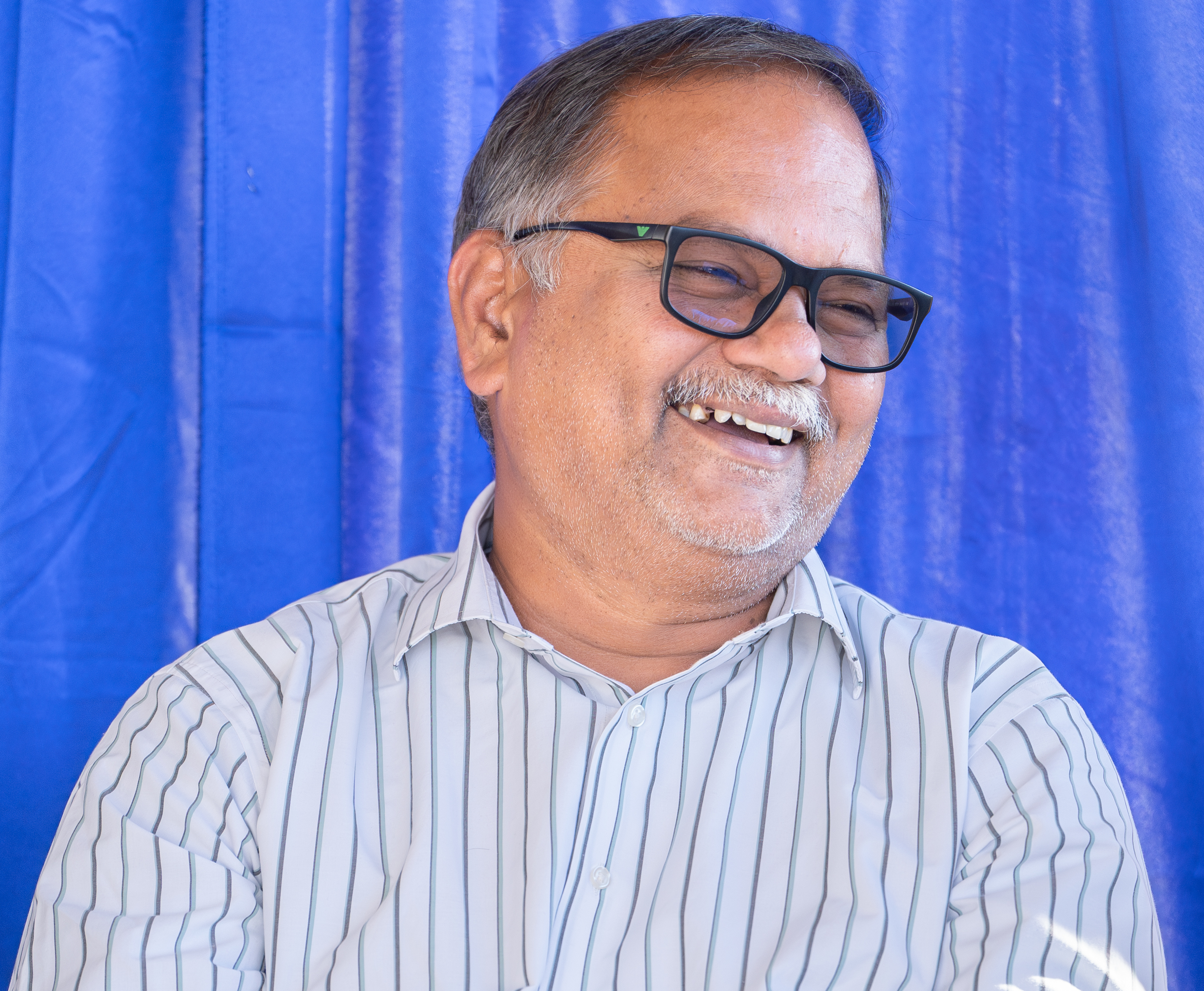
- Born: Vadrevu Nagendra Aditya; 30 April 1972 (age 54); Eluru, West Godavari district, Andhra Pradesh, India
- Occupations: Film director; screen writer; producer

V. N. Aditya (born 30 April 1972) is an Indian film director and screenwriter known for his works in Telugu cinema.

== Career ==
V. N. Aditya started his career in Chennai as Assistant Director for 3 films with director Singeetham Sreenivasa Rao titled as Brundavanam, Bhairavadeepam, Srikrishnarjuna Vijayam. He made his film debut with the 2001 family drama film Manasantha Nuvve starring Uday Kiran and Reemma Sen. The film ran for more than 200 days in many theatres across what was then the Andhra Pradesh.

V. N. Aditya went on to make Sreeram, a 2002 Tollywood film starring Uday Kiran, Anita Hassanandani and Ashish Vidyarthi. This was a remake of the Tamil film Dhill which starred Vikram, Laila Mehdin, Nassar and Vivek. His third film, Nenunnanu starring Nagarjuna Akkineni, Shriya Saran and Arthi Agarwal, was released in 2004 and became a hit. It was dubbed in Tamil as Chandramadhi and in Hindi as Vishwa ("The He Man").

Aditya's other films include Manasu Maata Vinadhu (2005) with Navdeep and Ankitha, Boss (2006) with Nagarjuna, Nayantara, and Poonam Bajwa, and Aata (2007) starring Siddharth Narayan and Ileana D'Cruz in the lead roles.

== Filmography ==
=== As Director ===
Year	Film	Notes
2001	Manasantha Nuvve	
2002	Sreeram	Remake of Dhill
2004	Nenunnanu	
2005	Manasu Maata Vinadhu	
2006	Boss	
2007	Aata	
2008	Rainbow	
2011	Raaj	
2011	Mugguru	
2018	Forced Orphans	English film
2021	LOVE@65	
2021	Maryada Krishnayya	
2022	Valliddari Madhya	
2025	Phani	

=== As Lyricist ===
Year	Film	Song(s)
2025	The Suspect	"Manase Manase"

== Honors ==
VN Aditya was awarded an honorary doctorate by the George Washington University of Peace, United States. Central Jury member for 68th Indian National Awards in 2022
