= Newton's 3rd Law (film) =

- Theatrical release poster
- Directed by: Rajesh Karna
- Written by: Rajesh Karna
- Produced by: Kohirkar Harish
- Starring: Abhinaya; Srinivas Avasarala; Jagapathi Babu; Ravi Varma
- Cinematography: Veda Vyas Gottipati
- Edited by: Anil Kumar Pasala
- Music by: Sinjith Yerramilli
- Production company: Mark My Words Entertainment
- Distributed by: ETV Win
- Release date: 31 July 2026
- Running time: 135 minutes
- Country: India
- Language: Telugu
- Box office: est. ₹2.08 Cr

Newton's 3rd Law is 2026 Indian Telugu language film written and directed by Rajesh Karna under the banner of Mark My Words Entertainment. The film stars Sumanth Akkineni Srinivas Avasarala and Jagapathi Babu in pivotal roles.

The film was released in theatres on 31 July 2026 and received mixed reviews from critics.

== Cast ==
- Sumanth as Inspector Vasudev
- Trinadh Varma as Vinay
- Shelly Kishore as Parvathi, Vinay's mother
- Ravi Varma as Gangadhar, Vinay's father
- Neha Pathan in a double role as Jyothi/Shravya
  - Abhinayana as young Shravya
- Srinivas Avasarala as SI Kishore/David
- Jagapathi Babu as Stephen Mercury
- Gowtham Pandit as Karthik, Vinay's friend

== Plot ==
The film opens with David (Srinivas Avasarala), who comes across a mysterious book that details a series of cold cases. Curiously, the events written in the book begin to mirror actual historical crimes from 1999—specifically a tragic, fatal vehicular accident and the brutal murder of a student named Vinay.

In 1999, the no-nonsense police investigator Vasudev (Sumanth) is assigned to look into what initially appears to be an ordinary, unfortunate accident. However, as Vasudev peels back the layers of the tragedy, forensic evidence indicates that the victim was systematically murdered, transforming the case into a complex double-homicide investigation.

Vasudev navigates through a maze of conflicting testimonies and multiple emerging theories. He begins interrogating individuals close to Vinay, including a highly suspicious friend, an alcoholic father, and a hard-working nurse trying to clear her husband's rising debts. The investigation deepens when Vasudev uncovers hidden relationships and complex criminal connections linking these ordinary citizens to a powerful, shadowy figure named Stephen Mercury (Jagapathi Babu).

As the timeline of the book in the present merges with Vasudev's 1999 investigation, the narrative reveals a meticulously planned web of revenge. In line with the titular scientific law, the climax uncovers how every corrupt action taken by the perpetrators in the past triggered an equal, inevitable, and devastating karmic reaction, bringing closure to the decades-old conspiracy.

== Release ==
=== Theatre ===
The film was theatrically released on 31 July 2026.

=== Home media ===
The film started streaming on Netflix on 28 August 2026.

== Critical reception ==
Srivathsan Nadadhur for The Hindu opined "The film frees itself from the excesses associated with a tale featuring familiar faces. The storyteller’s intent, for the most part, focuses on staying true to the genre. There is no attempt to oversell the plot or its twists and the execution is sure-footed."

Susmita Sameera of The Times of India stated "Despite a few surprise twists, the film fails to deliver the emotional or dramatic impact it aims for."

Bhargav Chaganti of NTV Telugu rated the film 2.5/5 stars.

The film earned review from BBC Telugu.

The film was also reviewed by Eenadu and Asianet Telugu.
