= Adithya Menon =

Indian actor

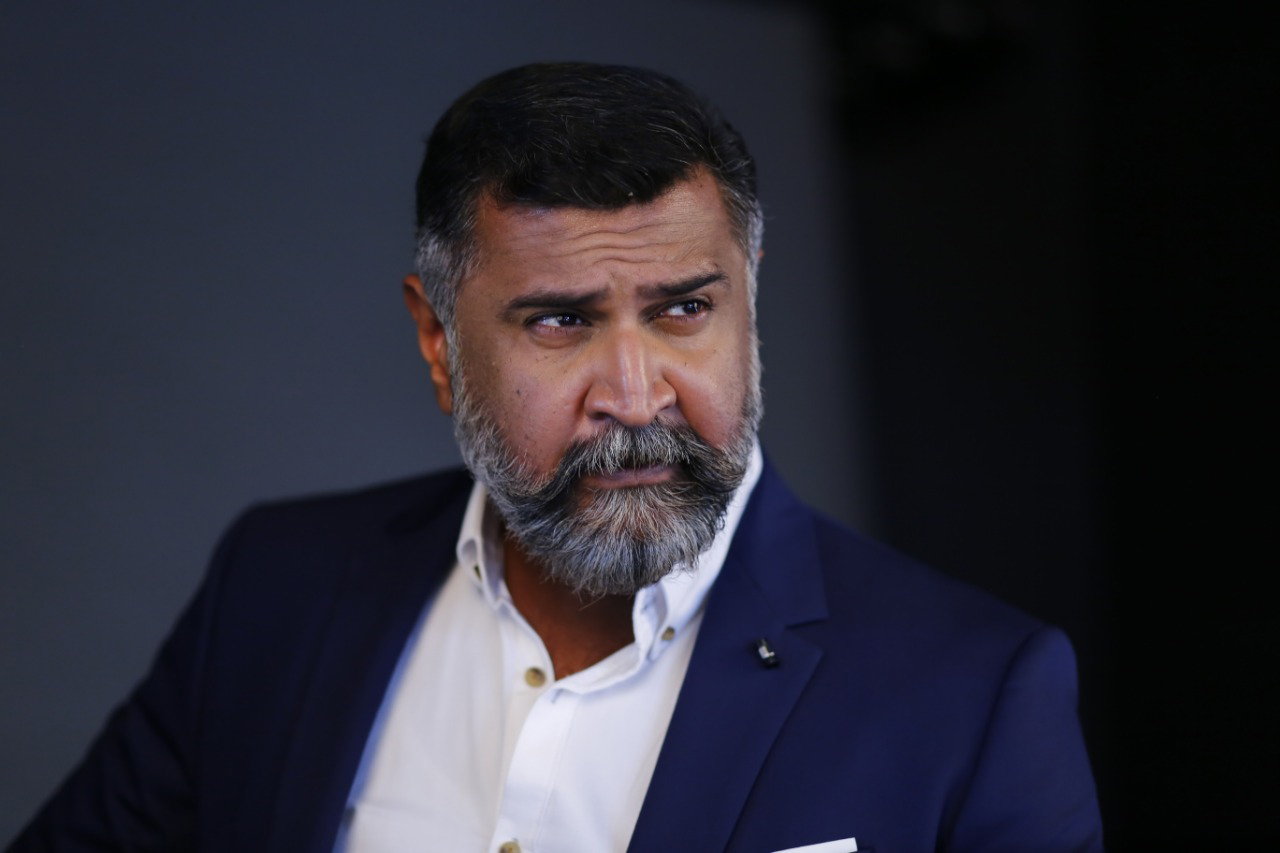
- Recent photoshoot of Aditya Menon
- Born: 6 April 1974 (age 52)
- Occupation: Actor
- Years active: 2003–present

Adithya Menon (born 6 April 1974) is an Indian actor who appears in Tamil, Telugu, Malayalam, Kannada and Hindi films.

== Early life ==
Adithya Menon was born in Mumbai into a Malayali family hailing from Palghat in Kerala. He spent his childhood in Dubai, UAE till the age of 18. He finished his schooling from the Our Own English High School Dubai and then went back to India. He earned his bachelor's degree in engineering from the M. S. Ramaiah Institute of Technology in Bangalore.

While in college, he auditioned for a slot at being a radio host with Radio Midday. That was his first stint in the media. Soon he started hosting live events like fashion shows and product launches. He worked as a compere and event manager for a few years after getting out of college. During this period he got into amateur theatre in Bangalore and acted in a few plays before being spotted by an actor Prakash Belawadi to star in a Kannada television serial he was to direct for the then launching ETV Kannada. Adithya first faced a camera for this serial, Mussanjeya Kathaprasanga. Subsequently, he was featured as the protagonist for another television serial called Soorya Shikari on the same channel directed by comedian Sihi Kahi Chandru.

He moved to Chennai in 2001 and scouted for work as an actor. He first appeared in a television serial on Sun TV called Thanthira Bhoomi directed by C. Jerrold and produced by Media Dreams. He then won a role in the TV serial Anni directed by K. Balachander. He kept trying to get into cinema and managed to get two movies as a newcomer. He was cast in Anjaneya (2003) and Jay Jay (2003) at the same time.

In 2004, he appeared in Malayalams films starrer Mohanlal in Vamanapuram Bus Route, Wanted and Mambazhakkalam.

He acted in Tamil films directed by Vishnuvardhan's Arinthum Ariyamalum (2005) and Billa (2007).

Adithya Menon made his Tollywood debut with the Prabhas starrer Billa in 2009. He went on to appear in films like Simha, Dookudu, Adhinayakudu, Krishnam Vande Jagadgurum, Eega, Mirchi, Baadshah, Balupu, Lion and among many others.

In 2014, he garnered attention for playing the lead role in Main Hoon Part-Time Killer, which garnered controversy for its previous title of Main Hoon Rajinikanth.

He has also worked in Kannada films like Shivajinagara (2014), Jaguar (2016), Kolara (2017), Seetharama Kalyana (2019) and James (2022).

Adithya Menon plays a CBI officer in the series Thalaimai Seyalagam (2024), initially rejected the offer for the role.

== Filmography ==
Key
| † | Denotes films that have not yet been released |

Actor

| Year | Film | Role | Language | Notes |
|---|---|---|---|---|
| 2003 | Anjaneya | Siva | Tamil | |
| 2003 | Jay Jay | Sivaram | Tamil | |
| 2004 | Vamanapuram Bus Route | Karipidi Gopi | Malayalam | |
| 2004 | Wanted | Guru | Malayalam | |
| 2004 | Mambazhakkalam | Dr. Raghuram | Malayalam | |
| 2004 | Chatrapathi | Siva | Tamil | |
| 2004 | Neranja Manasu | Inspector Adithya | Tamil | |
| 2005 | Arinthum Ariyamalum | ACP Thiyagarajan | Tamil | |
| 2005 | Ben Johnson | Vettukadan Velayuthan | Malayalam | |
| 2005 | Daas | Anwar | Tamil | |
| 2005 | Bus Conductor | S.I Sajan George | Malayalam | |
| 2006 | Aathi | Abdullah | Tamil | |
| 2006 | Raashtram | Amir Bhai | Malayalam | |
| 2006 | Pachakuthira | Terrorist | Malayalam | |
| 2006 | Kilukkam Kilukilukkam | Shivachandra Panikker | Malayalam | |
| 2006 | Chacko Randaaman | Parindhu Gopi | Malayalam | |
| 2006 | Bhargava Charitam Moonam Ghandam | Mariappan | Malayalam | |
| 2006 | Kedi | Aadhi | Tamil | |
| 2006 | Vattaram | Inspector | Tamil | |
| 2006 | Poi | Vishnu | Tamil | |
| 2007 | Parattai Engira Azhagu Sundaram | Deva | Tamil | |
| 2007 | Nanma | Paramashivam | Malayalam | |
| 2007 | Billa | Anil Menon | Tamil | |
| 2008 | Inba | Adhitya | Tamil | |
| 2008 | Thirutham | Saravanan | Tamil | |
| 2009 | Villu | Raaka | Tamil | |
| 2009 | TN 07 AL 4777 | Advocate Seshadri | Tamil | |
| 2009 | Billa | Adithya | Telugu | |
| 2009 | Kulir 100° | Surya's father | Tamil | |
| 2010 | Thanthonni | Anwar Ali | Malayalam | |
| 2010 | Simha | Gopi | Telugu | |
| 2010 | Kanagavel Kaaka | Karunakaran | Tamil | |
| 2010 | Singam | Vaikuntam | Tamil | |
| 2010 | Rhythm | | Malayalam | |
| 2010 | Pournami Nagam | Jagan | Tamil | |
| 2010 | Again Kasargod Khader Bhai | Ali Khan | Malayalam | |
| 2010 | Aattanayagann | Chandran | Malayalam | |
| 2011 | Collector | John Williams | Malayalam | |
| 2011 | Manushya Mrugam | Kamal Pasha | Malayalam | |
| 2011 | Dookudu | Sivayya | Telugu | |
| 2011 | Raa Raa | Dhana | Tamil | |
| 2011 | Naan Sivanagiren | | Tamil | |
| 2011 | Kshetram | Viswanadha Rayulu | Telugu | |
| 2012 | Adhinayakudu | Ramappa's brother | Telugu | |
| 2012 | Krishnam Vande Jagadgurum | Ramamurthy Naidu | Telugu | |
| 2012 | Eega | Sudeep's business partner | Telugu | |
| 2012 | Naan Ee | Sudeep's business partner | Tamil | |
| 2013 | Oduthalam | | Tamil | |
| 2013 | Mirchi | Babai | Telugu | |
| 2013 | Baadshah | Ganesh | Telugu | |
| 2013 | Jai Sreeram | Adinarayana | Telugu | |
| 2013 | Balupu | Nanaji's brother | Telugu | |
| 2013 | Onaayum Aattukkuttiyum | Yuva | Tamil | |
| 2013 | Bhai | Munna | Telugu | |
| 2014 | Antha Scene Ledu | Inspector | Telugu | |
| 2014 | Power | ACP Gautam | Telugu | |
| 2014 | Shivajinagara | Adithya | Kannada | |
| 2015 | Lion | Benerjee | Telugu | |
| 2015 | Main Hoon Part-Time Killer | Rajnikanth | Hindi | |
| 2015 | Eli | IG Mohanraj | Tamil | |
| 2015 | Rudhramadevi | Muraridevudu | Telugu | |
| 2015 | Pandaga Chesko | Villain | Telugu | |
| 2016 | Jaguar | Somnath Prasad | Kannada | |
| 2016 | Ner Mugam | | Tamil | |
| 2017 | Nenorakam | | Telugu | |
| 2017 | Kolara | Inspector Shivakumar | Kannada | |
| 2017 | Balakrishnudu | Ravinder Reddy | Telugu | |
| 2018 | Agnyaathavaasi | Seetharam's henchman | Telugu | |
| 2018 | Amar Akbar Anthony | Saboo Menon | Telugu | |
| 2018 | Bluff Master | Pasupathi | Telugu | |
| 2018 | Idam Jagath | Dr. Sravan | Telugu | |
| 2019 | Seetharama Kalyana | Viswa | Kannada | |
| 2019 | Rajdooth | Rajanna | Telugu | |
| 2019 | Guna 369 | Radha | Telugu | |
| 2019 | Venky Mama | Major Ajay Ahuja | Telugu | |
| 2019 | Market Raja MBBS | Dasappan | Tamil | |
| 2019 | RDX Love | Giri Prakash | Telugu | |
| 2021 | Natyam | Guru of Sitara | Telugu | |
| 2022 | James | Prathap Aras | Kannada | |
| 2022 | Karthikeya 2 | Santanu | Telugu | |
| 2022 | Captain | General Bala | Tamil | |
| 2024 | Lal Salaam | the brother of Shamsuddin's attacker | Tamil | |
| 2024 | Pushpa 2: The Rule | Kogatam Subba Reddy | Telugu | |
| 2025 | Identity | Raghunath Chinnappa | Malayalam | |
| 2025 | Vaamana | Karamlal | Kannada | |
| 2025 | Akkenam | Dada | Tamil | |
| 2025 | Hari Hara Veera Mallu | Nawab Commander | Telugu | |
| 2025 | Andhela Ravamidhi | Bharadwaj | Telugu | |

Key
| † | Denotes films that have not yet been released |

Television

| Year | Web Series | Role | Language | Platform |
|---|---|---|---|---|
| 2023 - Present | Rana Naidu | Srini | Hindi | Netflix |
| 2024 | Thalaimai Seyalagam | CBI officer Nawaz Khan | Tamil | ZEE5 |

Dubbing artiste

| Year | Film | Actor | Language | Notes |
|---|---|---|---|---|
| 2020 | Darbar | Sunil Shetty | Tamil | |
| 2025 | Masters of the Universe | Jared Leto | Tamil, Telugu, Malayalam (D) | |
