= Andhela Ravamidhi =

2025 Indian Telugu film

- Release poster
- Directed by: Indrani Davaluri; SaiRam Palley
- Story by: Venu Nakshathram
- Produced by: Indrani Davaluri
- Starring: Indrani Davaluri; Vikram Kolluru; Tanikella Bharani; Adithya Menon; Jayalalita
- Cinematography: Harsh Mahadeshwar; S.k Bhupathy
- Edited by: Avula Venkatesh
- Music by: Karthik Kodakandla
- Production company: Natyamargam Productions
- Release date: 11 October 2025
- Running time: 141 minutes
- Country: India
- Language: Telugu

Andhela Ravamidhi is a 2025 Indian Telugu-language Musical drama film directed by Indrani Davaluri and SaiRam Palley. Produced by Indrani Davaluri under Natyamargam Productions. It stars Indrani Davaluri, Vikram Kolluru, Tanikella Bharani, Adithya Menon, Jayalalita in lead roles.

The film was released on 11 October 2025.

== Plot ==
Pavani, a gifted Indian classical dancer, leads a seemingly perfect life with her husband Ramesh, an American-based entrepreneur. Their marriage, built on love and mutual respect, begins to fracture when Ramesh's traditional values clash with Pavani's artistic aspirations. Struggling to balance her identity as a performer and a wife, Pavani finds herself torn between societal expectations and her own dreams. As the couple faces the emotional turmoil of infertility, Pavani embarks on a journey of self-realization that challenges the conventions of marriage, ambition, and womanhood. Through heartbreak and resilience, she learns to reclaim her voice and redefine what happiness truly means.

== Cast ==
- Indrani Davaluri as Pavani Battiprolu
- Vikram Kolluru
- Tanikella Bharani as Viswanadham
- Adithya Menon as Bharadwaj
- Jayalalita as Jayamma
- Aadi Lokesh
- Idpl Nirmala

== Production ==
On 22 February 2025, the teaser of the film was launched by director Harish Shankar. The film trailer was released on 4 September 2025 and pre-release event of the film was held on 12 September 2025.

== Music ==
The music is composed by Karthik Kodakandla.

No.	Title	Lyrics	Singer(s)	Length
1.	"Vecchanni Sureedocche"	Raghukul Mokirala	Anjana Sowmya; Karthik	4:44
2.	"Innaluga"	Raghukul Mokirala	Ashwini Chepuri; Sudheer	3:51
3.	"Adenamma"	Puliyoor Dorai Swamy Iyer	Harini Darbha	3:14
4.	"Darule Leni"	Raghukula Mokirala	Karthik kodakandla	3:10
5.	"Thillana"	Maharaja Swathi Thirunal	Harini Darbha	5:02

== Release and reception ==
Andhela Ravamidhi is released theatrically on 11 October 2025.

Sudheer of Vaartha gave 2.75/5 stars and stated "Andela Ravamidi is an artful film that, unlike today’s commercial trends, commendably brings the beauty of Indian art to the screen, echoing K. Viswanath’s inspiration".

Sudharani of Telugu Prabha said "Andela Ravamidi is a heartfelt tribute to Indian classical dance and artistic excellence, appealing to audiences who value meaningful cinema".

Ramakrishna of India Herald rated the film 2.5/5 stars and stated "*With appealing music, impressive cinematography of American locales, and strong production values, Andela Ravamidi is a commendable effort".

Chitra Jyothy rated the film 2.5/5 stars and said "Opening with an accident and flashback, the film delivers a familiar story with an engaging screenplay and a message of perseverance for women".

Srikanth Reddy of Telugu Mirchi rated the film 2.75/5 stars and wrote "Karthik Kodakandla’s music and songs, along with cinematography capturing American locations and strong production values, contribute positively to the film".
