= Rainbow (2008 film) =

- Official poster
- Directed by: V. N. Aditya
- Screenplay by: Paruchuri brothers
- Story by: Balabhadrapatruni Ramani
- Produced by: V. N. Aditya
- Starring: Rahul; Sonal Chauhan; Sindhu Menon
- Cinematography: Santosh Srinivas
- Edited by: M. R. Varma
- Music by: Nihal
- Production companies: Sri Siddhardha Movies; Bharat Creations
- Release date: 2 October 2008
- Country: India
- Language: Telugu

Rainbow is a 2008 Indian Telugu-language romantic drama film directed by V. N. Aditya and starring Rahul, Sonal Chauhan, and Sindhu Menon. The film released to negative reviews from critics. The film is noted for its melodious soundtrack composed by Nihal, which adds to the emotional depth of the storyline.

== Plot ==
The story follows Shyam (Rahul), an aspiring film director, who lives with his grandfather and dreams of making it big in the film industry. He encounters Swapna (Sonal Chauhan), a blind girl with a passion for painting. Swapna's disability has never deterred her spirit or her colorful outlook on life. Shyam is captivated by her positive attitude and inner beauty.

As Shyam helps Swapna navigate her challenges and pursue her dream of becoming a painter, they develop a deep bond. However, complications arise when Swapna regains her sight through a surgery, and Shyam fears losing the special connection they share.

The narrative explores the emotional journey of the characters, highlighting the significance of inner beauty, unconditional love, and the power of dreams.

== Cast ==
- Rahul as Shyamal "Shyam" Rao
- Sonal Chauhan as Swapna
- Sindhu Menon as Kamala
- Aryan Shetty as Producer
- Gollapudi Maruti Rao as Maruthi Rao
- Paruchuri Venkateswara Rao as Srihari Rao
- Giri Babu as Rama Chandra Murthy
- Dharmavarapu Subrahmanyam as D. S. Maniam
- Sunil as Sunil Bachchan
- M. S. Narayana as Narayana
- Prakash Raj as Shyam's doctor
- Master Bharath as Pandu
- Vamshi Paidithalli as Waste Seenu
- Hema as Pandu's mother
- Siva Reddy as Shiva
- Mallikarjuna Rao as Berger Paints company head
- Kondavalasa Lakshmana Rao as Canteen uncle
- Pavala Shyamala as Raja's mother
- Kadambari Kiran as Narayana's friend
- Uttej
- Narsing Yadav
- S. S. Rajamouli as himself
- Kodi Ramakrishna as himself
- Srinu Vaitla as himself
- V. Samudra as himself
- Sangita Ghosh (Special appearance in a song "Sala Sala Sala")

== Production ==
The songs were choreographed by Suchitra Chandrabose. Two songs were shot in Bangkok and one song was shot near Begumpet Airport.

== Themes and influences ==
Jeevi of Idlebrain.com felt that the lead characters (Rahul being colourblind, Sindhu being mute, and Sonal being an actress) are similar to the characters of the 1986 film Sirivennela (Sarvadaman D. Banerjee is blind, Suhasini is mute, and Moon Moon Sen is glamorous).

== Soundtrack ==
The songs were composed by newcomer Nihal.

Track listing
No.	Title	Lyrics	Singer(s)	Length
1.	"Naa Kallalo"	Anuradha	Sunitha, Nihal	4:40
2.	"Swamy Ra Ra (Thillana)"	M. Balamuralikrishna	Sunitha, Nihal, Krishna Padam	2:36
3.	"Asa Chinna Asa"	Jillella Prasad	Sunitha	4:24
4.	"O Lalana"	Vanamali	Sunitha, Srikanth	3:55
5.	"Krishna Krishna"	Baladitya	Hemachandra	2:30
6.	"Challu Challu"	Vanamali	Sunitha, Nihal, Hemachandra	3:56
7.	"Manasa Chalinchake"	Vanamali	Sunitha, Nihal	4:13
8.	"Sala Sala Sala"	Sahithi	Sunitha	4:27
Total length:				30:41

== Release ==
Jeevi of Idlebrain.com gave the film a rating of 2.25 out of 5 and said that "Making a film like Rainbow is like entering a danger zone. Stories like these need strong narration and grip on emotions in order to work". Radhika Rajamani of Rediff.com gave the film a rating of two out of five stars. Y. Sunitha Chowdhury of The Hindu opined that "One doesn't understand why the director had to show the hero as being colour blind just to elevate his character and the heroine undergoing a change of heart just because she realises Shyam is suffering from an ailment looks unrealistic".
