= Manasu Maata Vinadhu =

- Directed by: V. N. Aditya
- Produced by: Potluri Phanindra Babu; Pulla Rao
- Starring: Navdeep; Ankitha
- Cinematography: J. Siva Kumar
- Edited by: Marthand K. Venkatesh
- Music by: Kalyan Koduri
- Release date: 12 February 2005
- Country: India
- Language: Telugu

Manasu Maata Vinadhu (transl. The Heart Doesn't Listen) is a 2005 Indian Telugu-language romance film, directed by V. N. Aditya. The film stars Navdeep and Ankitha.

== Plot ==
College student Venu pursues a relationship with Anu, who eventually reciprocates his feelings. After a rival suitor, Amit, also expresses interest, the two men resolve the conflict through a hockey match. Venu wins the match and subsequently marries Anu.

== Cast ==
- Navdeep as Venu
- Ankitha as Anuradha "Anu"
- Sandeep as Arun Kumar
- Tanikella Bharani as Venu's father
- Dharmavarapu Subramanyam as College Lecturer
- Venu Madhav as College Lecturer
- Nagababu as Subash Chandra Bose
- Sobha Rani as College Lecturer
- Hema as Venu's mother
- Venki
- Ahuti Prasad as Arun's father
- Master Bharath as Bunty, Venu's brother
- Narra Venkateswara Rao as DSP
- Lobo as College student

== Soundtrack ==
The music was composed by Kalyan Koduri and released by Aditya Music. The audio was released on 24 December 2004.

Manasu Maata Vinadhu

Soundtrack album by Kalyan Koduri
- Released: 2004
- Recorded: 2004
- Genre: Soundtrack
- Length: 39:14
- Label: Aditya Music
- Producer: Kalyan Koduri

Kalyan Koduri chronology
Naam (2003)	Manasu Maata Vinadhu (2004)	Andhrudu (2005)

Track-List
No.	Title	Lyrics	Singer(s)	Length
1.	"Nuvvu Nijam"	Sirivennela Seetharama Sastry	Kalyan Koduri, Sunitha	4:55
2.	"Eenamina Makarina"	Viswa	Tippu	4:17
3.	"Nuvvu Marosari"	Sirivennela Seetharama Sastry	Kalyan Koduri, Zeena Roy	4:54
4.	"Gubulendhukey"	M. M. Keeravani	K. K.	3:29
5.	"Aravailo"	Chandrabose	Shreya Ghoshal, K. K.	4:11
6.	"Saradaga Untam"	Sirivennela Seetharama Sastry	Sukhwinder Singh	4:11
7.	"Matunnadi"	Venki	Malathi, Venki	3:37
8.	"Nuvvu Nijam" (Instrumental)			4:54
9.	"Nuvvu Marosari" (Instrumental)			4:46
Total length:				39:14

== Reception ==
Jeevi of Idlebrain.com rated the film 2 1/4 out of 5 and wrote that "This film is good in few scenes, but the holistic perspective is missing. This film is a let-down coming from a director of such a high caliber". A critic from Full Hyderabad wrote that "Not worth a watch unless you are not going to see the movie".
