= Aata (2007 film) =

2007 Indian film by V. N. Aditya

- Directed by: V. N. Aditya
- Written by: M. S. Raju; Paruchuri Brothers
- Produced by: M. S. Raju
- Starring: Siddharth; Ileana D'Cruz
- Cinematography: Chota K. Naidu
- Edited by: K. V. Krishna Reddy
- Music by: Devi Sri Prasad
- Production company: Sumanth Art Productions
- Release date: 9 May 2007
- Country: India
- Language: Telugu
- Box office: ₹8 crore distributors' share

Aata (transl. Game) is a 2007 Indian Telugu-language romantic action comedy film directed by V. N. Aditya and produced by M. S. Raju. It stars Siddharth and Ileana D'Cruz in the lead roles, while Munna, Sarath Babu, Brahmanandam, and Sunil play supporting roles. The music was composed by Devi Sri Prasad with cinematography by Chota K. Naidu and editing by K. V. Krishna Reddy. Aata was released on 9 May 2007 to mostly negative reviews and unsuccessful at the box office. The film was remade in Bengali as Kellafate (2010).

== Plot ==
Srikrishna is a young man living in a village with his father Panduranga Rao, who runs a theater. Krishna wants to live his life like a hero, just as in the movies that play in his father's theater. He meets Satya at a carnival and immediately falls for her. He helps her escape from hooligans and takes her to a safe place. They spent some time together, and Satya also gets connected with him. She reveals that she is escaping a proposed marriage to Vicky, the son of politician Jayaprakash. She tells a flashback that reveals that Vicky raped and killed her friend on New Year's Eve. He got released by the court as an innocent, using his political influence. Frustrated, Satya tried to hit him with a stone, but in return, when Vicky sees her, he becomes infatuated with her and wants to marry her regardless of her consent.

Vicky and his parents blackmailed Satya's parents and arranged their wedding. Satya narrowly escaped from a train and tried to get to her aunt's house, then she met Krishna. She asked him to marry her and go to a safe place where Vicky cannot find them, but Krishna takes her to Vicky and gains his confidence. He starts his game using Vicky as a pawn and tells him to gain Satya's confidence. They play with him, and meanwhile, Vicky befriends Krishna and starts telling his secrets. Finally, one day, while inebriated, Vicky reveals to Krishna that he killed Satya's friend and escaped punishment. Krishna records the confession and gives it to a commissioner, who was waiting for evidence to convict Vicky. Finally, Vicky gets arrested, and Satya and Krishna get married with their parent's blessings.

== Cast ==
- Siddharth as Srikrishna
- Ileana D'Cruz as Satya
- Munna as Vicky
- Sarath Babu as Panduranga Rao, Srikrishna's father
- Brahmanandam as Priest
- Sunil as Vicky's brother-in-law
- Jaya Prakash Reddy as Jayaprakash, Vicky's father
- Anuradha as Muthyalu, Vicky's mother
- Sayaji Shinde as Police Officer
- Dharmavarapu Subrahmanyam as Manik Chand
- Ravi Babu as Ravi, Vicky's friend
- Gundu Hanumantha Rao as Priest
- Narsing Yadav as Vicky's henchman
- Prabhas Sreenu as Thief
- Devadas Kanakala
- A.V.S.
- Kondavalasa
- Abhinayasri (special appearance)
- Smita (special appearance)
- M. S. Raju (special appearance)

== Music ==
The music and soundtrack of the movie was composed by Devi Sri Prasad and released by Aditya Music.

Aata

Soundtrack album by Devi Sri Prasad
- Released: 15 April 2007
- Recorded: 2007
- Genre: Soundtrack
- Length: 29:36
- Label: Aditya Music
- Producer: Devi Sri Prasad

Devi Sri Prasad chronology
Jagadam (2007)	Aata (2007)	Shankar Dada Zindabad (2007)

Track list
No.	Title	Lyrics	Singer(s)	Length
1.	"Aata"	Sirivennela Seetharama Sastry	Shankar Mahadevan	5:28
2.	"Hoyna"	Sirivennela Seetharama Sastry	Karthik, Chitra	5:08
3.	"Yela Yela"	Sirivennela Seetharama Sastry	Sunitha, Smita	3:58
4.	"Ninu Choosthunte"	Sirivennela Seetharama Sastry	Siddharth, Sumangali	5:13
5.	"Muddulata Muddulata"	Chandrabose	Udit Narayan, Sunitha (Vocals)	5:15
6.	"Kakinada Kaaja"	Chandrabose	Tippu, Gopika Poornima	4:34
Total length:				29:36

== Production ==
Some critics noted that the plot closely follows the plot of the Pawan Kalyan's film Gudumba Shankar. Aata did very well commercially, however.

The film was dubbed into Tamil as Gillida, and in Hindi as Aaj Ka Great Gambler, and in Oriya as Hero.

== Reception ==
Radhika Rajmani of Rediff.com rated the film 2/5 and called it "disappointing." "The second half has all the action, but somehow does not grab the attention of the viewer. Too many unnecessary songs distract the narrative. There is an attempt to keep suspense alive, but this too falls flat," she added. Idlebrain.com's Jeevi rated the film 3/5 and wrote, "MS Raju is always known for putting a strong emotional content in all his films irrespective of their box office performance. For the first time, he attempted making a film that does not have any emotional depth."
