= Daggaraga Dooranga =

- Poster
- Directed by: Ravikumar Chavali
- Produced by: J. Samba Siva Rao
- Starring: Sumanth; Vedhika; Brahmanandam; Sindhu Tolani
- Cinematography: T. Surendra Reddy
- Edited by: Nandamuri Hari
- Music by: Raghu Kunche
- Distributed by: Sudha Cinema
- Release date: 26 August 2011
- Country: India
- Language: Telugu

Daggaraga Dooranga (దగ్గరగా దూరంగా; transl. Nearer Farther) is a 2011 Telugu-language romantic thriller film starring Sumanth, Vedhika and Sindhu Tolani. It was dubbed into Malayalam as Poovithal Azhaku (പൂവിതൾ അഴകു്), into Tamil as Poovodum Puyalodum, and into Hindi as Aatank Ki Jung.

== Plot ==
Gowtham (Sumanth) is an ad filmmaker who creates an imaginary digital model for one of his projects. That model unexpectedly closely resembles a real life woman, Meenakshi (Vedhika), whose engagement gets canceled due to Gowtham's provocative ad. An angry Meenakshi decides take action on Gowtham and his ad agency.

She contacts her friend Zahreen (Sindhu Tolani), an investigative journalist to take action against Gowtham. Zahreen meanwhile is on a dangerous mission, attempting to expose an impending terrorist attack. Zahreen hands over a DVD containing details of the terrorists to Meenakshi before she gets killed.

The terrorists are now after Meenakshi for that DVD. Gowtham unexpectedly is caught in her predicament and tries to protect her. Meenakshi and Gowtham, now on the run, are the only ones who can prevent this impending terrorist act.

== Cast ==
- Sumanth as Gautam
- Vedhika as Meenakshi
- Ranganath
- Brahmanandam as Johnny
- Sindhu Tolani as Zareena
- Pragathi
- Ahuti Prasad
- Ajay
- Ravi Prakash
- Krishna Bhagavan as Bhagawan
- Raghu Babu
- Satyam Rajesh
- Kondavalasa Lakshmana Rao
- Duvvasi Mohan

== Soundtrack ==
No.	Title	Singer(s)	Length
1.	"Think Different"	Raghu Kunche	4:18
2.	"Anakey"	Chinmayi, Raghu Kunche	4:21
3.	"Manasu Manasu"	Raghu Kunche	3:35
4.	"Kallo Kochhavey"	Ranina Reddy, Essua	3:55
5.	"Pedda Puli"	Madhu Priya, Pedda Pulli Eshwar	3:29

== Critical reception ==
From rediff.com's review: On the whole, Daggaraga Dooranga is watchable. Sumanth and Vedhicka carry the film on their shoulders. The lead pair does a good job. Sumanth gives a fine performance and Vedhicka has a fairly substantial role and lives up to it.
