= The Inscrutable Americans (film) =

- Official poster
- Directed by: Chandra Siddhartha
- Based on: The Inscrutable Americans by Anurag Mathur
- Produced by: Dr. Srihari; Indira Malempatti
- Starring: Rajiv Punja; Eron Otcasek
- Cinematography: Rajendraprasad Chittabathini
- Production company: Tricolour Communications
- Release date: 2001
- Country: India
- Language: English
- Budget: ₹1 crore

The Inscrutable Americans is a 2001 Indian English-language comedy drama film directed by Chandra Siddhartha and starring Rajeev Punja and Eron Otcasek.

== Cast ==
- Rajiv Punja as Gopal
- Eron Otcasek as Randy
- Jai Menon as Bhushan a.k.a. Bush
- Jana Williams as Sue
- Stacci Cobb as Gloria

== Production ==
The film was shot at Mount Holyoke College and University of Hartford. The film was produced by Malemapati Srihari and Indira, who both worked as producers for Padamati Sandhya Ragam (1986). The film was almost entirely shot in the United States. The film was shot for two days in Hyderabad.

== Reception ==
Ruchi Sharma of Rediff.com opined that "But as small-budget films go, The Inscrutable Americans is a marvellous attempt. The performances are tremendous, the dialogue truly crackles with wit and an earthy, though ribald, humour". Dhiraj Singh of Outlook India gave the film a rating of one out of five stars and said that "Laugh if you must but remember the joke's, ultimately, on you". Arati Koppar from The Times of India gave the film a rating of two out of five and wrote that "rajiv punja is decent as gopal, but eron otcasek steals the show with his act as randy. he's smart, funny, witty, and very, very likeable. watch the film for him, if you will. but, take our advice. stick to the book". Avishek Gupta of Full Hyderabad stated that "The leads thoroughly live their roles, but of the rest of the characters, the lesser spoken, the better. May yet prove to be an entertaining watch, but those who've already read the book had better stay away".
