= Tanvi Vyas =

Indian actress

- Born: 30 September 1985 (age 40); Vadodara, Gujarat, India
- Occupations: Actor, model, designer
- Years active: 2009–2016

Tanvi Vyas (born 30 September 1985) is an Indian actress and beauty pageant titleholder. She was crowned Femina Miss India Earth 2008 in Mumbai.

== Film career ==
She got an acting role in Nenem Chinna Pillana (2013).

Awards and achievements
Preceded by Pooja Chitgopekar	Miss Earth India; 2008	Succeeded by Shriya Kishore
