= Nenem Chinna Pillana =

Nenem Chinna Pillana..?
- Directed by: P. Sunil Kumar Reddy
- Story by: Balabhadrapatruni Ramani
- Produced by: D. Ramanaidu
- Starring: Rahul Ravindran; Tanvi Vyas; Sanjjana
- Cinematography: Sabu James
- Music by: M. M. Srilekha
- Production company: Suresh Productions
- Release date: 8 November 2013
- Country: India
- Language: Telugu

Nenem Chinna Pillana..? (transl. Am I a little girl or what..?) is a 2013 Indian Telugu-language film directed by P. Sunil Kumar Reddy and produced by D. Ramanaidu under Suresh Productions. It features Rahul Ravindran and Tanvi Vyas in the lead.

== Cast ==
- Rahul Ravindran as Krish
- Tanvi Vyas as Swapna
- Sanjjana
- Sarath Babu
- Aamani
- Suman
- Raghu Babu
- L.B. Sriram
- Ali
- Venu Madhav
- Kasi Viswanath
- Thagubothu Ramesh
- Jaya Prakash Reddy
- AVS
- D. Ramanaidu (cameo)

== Production ==
The film was partially shot in Skåne County, Sweden.

== Reception ==
The Times of India gave the film a rating of three-and-half out of five stars and stated that "It's that kind of a movie that didn't draw the masses into the theatres when it was released, however, it's worth a watch. Rahul deserves appreciation for portraying his role just perfect".
