= Under Suspicion =

Under Suspicion may refer to:

- Bajo sospecha (Under suspicion), a 2015–2016 Spanish crime drama television series
- Under Suspicion (1918 film), an American silent film comedy-mystery directed by Will S. Davis
- Under Suspicion (1919 film), a British silent drama film directed by Walter West
- Under Suspicion (1928 film), a German silent crime film directed by Constantin J. David
- Under Suspicion (1930 film), an American pre-Code drama film directed by A. F. Erickson
- Under Suspicion (1937 film), an American mystery film directed by Lewis D. Collins
- Under Suspicion (1991 film), a neo noir film directed by Simon Moore
- Under Suspicion (2000 film), an American-French thriller film directed by Stephen Hopkins
- Under Suspicion (TV series), a 1994–1995 American police drama television series set in Portland, Oregon
- "Under Suspicion", a 2005 episode of the American police procedural drama television series CSI: Miami
