= Raaj (film) =

- Theatrical release poster
- Directed by: V. N. Aditya
- Written by: V. N. Aditya
- Produced by: Kumar Brothers
- Starring: Sumanth; Vimala Raman; Priyamani
- Music by: Koti
- Distributed by: Kumar Brothers Cinema
- Release date: 18 March 2011 (India)
- Running time: 110 minutes
- Country: India
- Language: Telugu

Raaj is a 2011 Indian Telugu-language film directed by V. N. Aditya and produced under the banner of Kumar Brothers Cinema. Sumanth, Priyamani and Vimala Raman played the lead roles. Koti is the music composer for this film. It released on 18 March 2011 to extremely negative reviews. It was later dubbed into Tamil and Malayalam under the title Maharani – The Beauty Queen. RKD Studios have bought the sole and exclusive rights of the film in Hindi and all other Northern Indian languages.

== Plot ==
The story is about Raaj (Sumanth), a fashion photographer who is caught between his wife Mythili (Priyamani) and his ex-lover Priya (Vimala Raman). Raaj chooses not to tell Mythili about Priya and finds it difficult to adjust to his wife during the early days of their marriage. However, their relationship improves with time, and they finally get closer. Just when things settle down, Priya comes back into Raaj's life unexpectedly. Raaj gets curious about why Priya left him abruptly earlier. Priya is later kidnapped by a scorned lover (Ajay). Raaj saves her from his clutches subsequently. In an unexpected twist, it is revealed that Mythili and Priya were actually classmates in school. Raaj later uncovers Priya's ulterior motive, tells Mythili the truth. Priya sacrifices herself. Raaj reconciles with his wife.

== Cast ==
- Sumanth as Raaj
- Priyamani as Mythili
- Vimala Raman as Priya
- Ajay as Ajay, Priya's ex-lover
- Murali Mohan as Bhuvanagiri Bhavani Prasad
- Satyam Rajesh as Rajesh, Raaj's friend
- Giri Babu as Rama Chandra Murthy, Raaj's father
- Chandra Mohan as Chandram, Mythili And Priya's father
- Janaki Sabesh as Annapurna, Mythili And Priya's mother
- Suhasini Maniratnam as Snehalatha, Raaj's mother
- Brahmanandam as Nandagopal / Nandu, Raaj's friend
- K Viswanath as Sivaramaiah, Raaj's grandfather
- Telangana Shakuntala as Shakuntala, Raaj's grandmother
- Ali as Chanti, Raaj's friend
- Srinivasa Reddy as Seenayya Seenu, Raaj's friend

== Soundtrack ==
- "Sootiga Chooseva" | Hemachandra, Sunitha
- "Andamutho Pandemuga" | Siddharth, Malavika
- "Kalakaaduga" | Shashikiran, Anjana Soumya
- "Nanne Nenu Marichipoya" | Deepu, Sravana Bhargavi
- "Prathi Kala Naalo" | Srikrishna, Pranavi
- "Bhimavaram Bulloda" | Srikrishna, Sunitha

== Reception ==
Radhika Rajamani of Rediff.com gave the film a rating of 1 1/2 and opined that "Barring the good cinematography, Aditya has churned out an insipid film". A critic from 123telugu said that "Raaj has nothing special for an ordinary Telugu cinema viewer".
