= Chandra Siddhartha =

Indian film director, screenwriter and producer

Chandra Siddarth.
- Born: 12 May 1969 (age 57); Andhra Pradesh, India
- Education: Nizam College

Chandra Siddartha is an Indian film director, screenwriter and producer known for his works in Telugu cinema. He is known for producing the film Nirantharam (1995) and directing the films The Inscrutable Americans (2001), Aa Naluguru (2004), and Andari Bandhuvaya (2010). He served as Jury member at the 57th, 61st and 65th National Film Awards, as well as the 49th IFFI. He served as jury member for Andhra Pradesh state Nandi awards and South Indian cinematographers association movie awards.

== Early life and career ==
Chandra Siddhartha was born to C. Poorna Chandra Rao and C. Sakunthala Devi. Siddhartha has attended Nizam College in Hyderabad and holds a degree in Telugu Literature, from Osmania University. He has worked as an Assistant director for the 1991 film Jaitra Yatra with Uppalapati Narayana Rao.

== Awards ==
Nandi Awards

- Nandi Award for Best Feature Film (director) - Aa Naluguru
- Nandi Award for Akkineni Award for best home-viewing feature film - Andari Bandhuvaya
- Nandi Special Jury Award - Andari Bandhuvaya

== Filmography ==
As director

Movie	Year	Language	Notes
2001	The Inscrutable Americans	English	
2003	Appudappudu	Telugu	
2004	Aa Naluguru	Telugu	
2007	Madhumasam	Telugu	
2008	Idi Sangathi	Telugu	
2010	Andari Bandhuvaya	Telugu	
2014	Emo Gurram Egaravachu	Telugu	
2018	Aatagadharaa Siva	Telugu	
2026	Ee Paata Korinavaaru	Telugu	

As actor

- NTR: Kathanayakudu (2019) as Dasari Narayana Rao

As producer

- Nirantharam (1995)
- House Full
- Ee Paata Korinavaaru (2026)
