= Suspect (game show) =

- Genre: Children's game show
- Presented by: Simon Grant
- Country of origin: United Kingdom
- Original language: English
- No. of series: 1
- No. of episodes: 15

Production
- Running time: 30 minutes
- Production company: BBC Scotland

Original release
- Network: BBC Two
- Release: 29 January – 16 February 2007

Suspect is a British children's game show that aired on BBC Two from 29 January to 16 February 2007.

== Overview ==
Children attempt to solve crimes committed at the fictional Kilcrammond House Hotel to gain admittance to the Academy of Criminal Investigation (an anagrammatic acronym of the CIA). The show is presented by Simon Grant who plays the part of the hotel manager.

The show uses a fictitious crime, which the children must solve. Most crimes have managed to relate to children in some way. There have been various crimes, from theft to sabotage, forgery to food poisoning. The children then attempt to solve the case. They however, know that the offender is one of four presented to them at the start. The children get the chance to use forensics equipment, to check fingerprints, and soil samples. They have the chance to talk to three of the four suspects, before making their final decision. If the children are correct, they receive entry in to the ACI (Academy of Criminal Investigation).
