= Jayalalita =

Indian actress

- Born: Jayalalita; Gudivada, Krishna district, Andhra Pradesh, India
- Occupation: Actress
- Years active: 1984–Present

Jayalalita is an Indian character actress who acted in about 650 films in Telugu, Tamil, Malayalam and Hindi.

== Early life ==
Jayalalita was born in Gudivada, a town in Krishna district of the Indian state of Andhra Pradesh. She completed her Bachelor of Economics. She, with her sister, did 1000 stage shows. She was trained in classical dance.

== Filmography ==
| Year | Title | Role | Language | Notes |
|---|---|---|---|---|
| 1986 | Uppu | Amina | Malayalam | |
| 1986 | Chantabbai | | Telugu | |
| 1986 | Srimathi Kanuka | | Telugu | |
| 1986 | Padaharella Ammayi | | Telugu | |
| 1986 | Poovinu Puthiya Poonthennal | Sathi | Malayalam | |
| 1987 | Theekkattu | Sreedevi | Malayalam | |
| 1987 | Ponnu | | Malayalam | |
| 1987 | Vrutham | | Malayalam | |
| 1987 | Thoovanathumbikal | Ranjini | Malayalam | |
| 1987 | Satyagraham | | Telugu | |
| 1987 | Shrutilayalu | Panchali | Telugu | |
| 1988 | Inquilabinte Puthri | SI Geetha | Malayalam | |
| 1988 | Vaisali | Rajapathni | Malayalam | |
| 1988 | Oru Muthassi Katha | Valli | Malayalam | |
| 1988 | Isabella | Thankamani | Malayalam | |
| 1989 | Oru Vadakkan Veeragatha | Dancer | Malayalam | |
| 1989 | Ivalente Kaamuki | | Malayalam | |
| 1989 | Aval Oru Sindhu | | Malayalam | |
| 1989 | Pooram | Vilasini | Malayalam | |
| 1989 | Antharjanam | | Malayalam | |
| 1989 | Ashokante Ashwathykuttikku | | Malayalam | |
| 1989 | Eenam Thettatha Kattaru | Neeli | Malayalam | |
| 1989 | Utharam | Dr.Malathi Krishna | Malayalam | |
| 1989 | Indrudu Chandrudu | | Telugu | |
| 1989 | Vaadakagunda | | Malayalam | |
| 1989 | Carnivel | Alli | Malayalam | |
| 1989 | Ayiram Chirakulla Moham | | Malayalam | |
| 1990 | Doctor Bhavani | | Telugu | |
| 1990 | Lorry Driver | | Telugu | |
| 1990 | Kadapa Reddemma | | Telugu | |
| 1990 | Aggiramudu | Saroja | Telugu | |
| 1990 | Mama Alludu | | Telugu | |
| 1990 | Vaisakha Raathri | | Malayalam | |
| 1990 | Enquiry | | Malayalam | |
| 1991 | Appula Appa Rao | Tata Rao's wife | Telugu | |
| 1991 | Vichitra Prema | Kalpana | Telugu | |
| 1991 | Rowdy Gari Pellam | | Telugu | |
| 1991 | Jagannatakam | | Telugu | |
| 1991 | People's Encounter | | Telugu | |
| 1991 | April 1st Vidudala | Bhagyam | Telugu | |
| 1991 | Yerra Mandaram | Kotamma | Telugu | |
| 1991 | Kobbari Bondam | Jana Bettula Janamma | Telugu | |
| 1992 | 420 | | Telugu | |
| 1992 | Detective Naarada | | Telugu | |
| 1992 | Seethapathi Chalo Tirupathi | | Telugu | |
| 1992 | Pranadaata | | Telugu | |
| 1992 | Champion | | Telugu | |
| 1992 | Ahankari | | Telugu | |
| 1992 | Subba Rayudi Pelli | | Telugu | |
| 1992 | Dharma Kshetram | | Telugu | |
| 1992 | Joker Mama Super Alludu | Chukka | Telugu | |
| 1992 | Akka Mogudu | | Telugu | |
| 1993 | Mutha Mestri | | Telugu | |
| 1993 | Sarasaala Soggadu | Rashmi | Telugu | |
| 1993 | Vasthavam | | Telugu | |
| 1993 | Akka Pettanam Chelleli Kapuram | | Telugu | |
| 1993 | Repati Rowdy | | Telugu | |
| 1993 | Mechanic Alludu | | Telugu | |
| 1993 | Manavarali Pelli | Nagulu | Telugu | |
| 1993 | Rowdy Mogudu | Pushpa | Telugu | |
| 1993 | Jamba Lakidi Pamba | | Telugu | |
| 1993 | Aadarsham | | Telugu | |
| 1993 | Joker | | Telugu | |
| 1994 | Periya Marudhu | | Tamil | |
| 1994 | O Thandri O Koduku | | | |
| 1994 | Thodi Kodallu | | | |
| 1994 | Prema & Co | | | |
| 1995 | Lingababu Love Story | | Telugu | |
| 1995 | Sisindri | | Telugu | |
| 1995 | Bhale Bullodu | | Telugu | |
| 1995 | Muddayi Muddugumma | | Telugu | |
| 1995 | Adavi Dora | | Telugu | |
| 1995 | Leader | | Telugu | |
| 1995 | Real Hero | | Telugu | |
| 1995 | Hathkadi | Sub-inspector Phoolan Devi | Hindi | |
| 1996 | Topi Raja Sweety Roja | | Telugu | |
| 1996 | Bobbili Bullodu | | Telugu | |
| 1996 | Sri Krishnarjuna Vijayam | | Telugu | |
| 1996 | Vamsanikokkadu | | Telugu | |
| 1996 | Oho Naa Pellanta | | Telugu | |
| 1997 | Collector Garu | | Telugu | |
| 1997 | Ugadi | | Telugu | |
| 1997 | Thoka Leni Pitta | | Telugu | |
| 1997 | Singanna | | Telugu | |
| 1997 | Pelli | | Telugu | |
| 1997 | Taraka Ramudu | | Telugu | |
| 1998 | Kodukulu | | Telugu | |
| 1998 | Aval Varuvala | | Tamil | |
| 1998 | Sreevarante Maavare | | Telugu | |
| 1999 | Panchadara Chilaka | | Telugu | |
| 2001 | Jackpot | | Telugu | |
| 2003 | Nenu Pelliki Ready | | Telugu | |
| 2004 | Grahanam | Saradamba | Telugu | |
| 2005 | Youth | Newly joined lecturer | Telugu | |
| 2005 | Veeri Veeri Gummadi Pandu | Mother | Telugu | |
| 2005 | Allari Bullodu | | Telugu | |
| 2005 | Evadi Gola Vaadidhi | | Telugu | |
| 2005 | Hungama | | Telugu | |
| 2005 | Radha Gopalam | | Telugu | |
| 2005 | Chinuku | | Telugu | |
| 2006 | Mayabazar | | Telugu | |
| 2006 | Veedhi | | Telugu | |
| 2006 | Kitakitalu | | Telugu | |
| 2006 | Indian Beauty | Herself | Telugu | |
| 2006 | 10th Class | | Telugu | |
| 2007 | Gundamma Gaari Manavadu | | Telugu | |
| 2007 | Gnapakam | | Telugu | |
| 2008 | Aatadista | | Telugu | |
| 2008 | Kasi Patnam Chudara Babu | | Telugu | |
| 2008 | Navvule Navvulu | | Telugu | |
| 2009 | Gopi Gopika Godavari | | Telugu | |
| 2009 | Venkatadri | | | |
| 2012 | No. 66 Madhura Bus | Suryapadmam's aunt | Malayalam | |
| 2013 | Adavi Kaachina Vennela | | Telugu | |
| 2018 | Bharat Ane Nenu | Speaker | Telugu | |
| 2022 | Ori Devuda | Judge | Telugu | |
| 2025 | Andhela Ravamidhi | Jayamma | Telugu | |

== Television ==
- Manoyagnam as Rajeswari Devi (ETV)
- Goranta Deepam as Durgamma (Zee Telugu)
- Mutyala Muggu as Mukta Devi (Zee Telugu)
- Radha Gopalam as Kondaveeti Jayadevamma (Gemini TV)
- Ammamma.com as Ammamma (Star Maa)
- Gruha pravesam (Zee Telugu)
- Deeparadhana as Malini Devi (Gemini TV)
- Alitho Saradaga as herself (ETV)
- Mounaraagam as Temple's chief (cameo) (Star Maa)
- Prema Entha Madhuram as Sharada Devi (Zee Telugu)
- Trinayini as Lalitha Devi (cameo) Zee Telugu
- Saadhana as Rajya Lakshmi (Gemini TV)
