= Thozha (2008 film) =

- Theatrical release poster
- Directed by: N. Sundareswaran
- Written by: N. Sundareswaran
- Produced by: M. Palani; M. Sureshkumar; V. Baskaran; P. Paramasivan
- Starring: Nithin Sathya; Ajay Raj; Premji; Vijay Vasanth; Sagithiya; Nancy Jennifer; Lakshana; Soumya Bollapragada
- Cinematography: P. Danaa
- Edited by: Sai Suresh
- Music by: Premji Amaran
- Production company: Arowana Films
- Release date: 11 April 2008
- Country: India
- Language: Tamil

Thozha (transl. Companion) is a 2008 Indian Tamil-language coming-of-age drama film written and directed by N. Sundareswaran. Nithin Sathya, Ajay Raj, Premji Amaren, Vijay Vasanth and Soumya Bollapragada play the lead roles while Nancy Jennifer, who has appeared in a sister role in Ghilli is making her debut as a heroine. Those four actors have already worked together in Chennai 600028.

== Plot ==
The story is about four friends and one of them sacrificing his life for the sake of friendship. Arivazhagan, Gajani, and Raja are close friends. Veluchami, who is out to avenge the killing of his younger sister by her boyfriend, also joins these friends. In this situation, a rowdy's daughter Priya loves Velu, but he does not reciprocate. He has to first kill the person who cheated his sister and took her life. When it is known that it is Raja is the culprit, Ajay picks up an aruval and rushes to confront him. In the meantime, Raja hires a mercenary paying him ₹500,000 (equivalent to ₹1.4 million or US$15,000 in 2023) to kill Velu. The friends are divided, and the outcome of the clashes between them forms the climax.

== Cast ==
- Nithin Sathya as Raja
- Ajay Raj as Veluchami
- Premji as Arivazhagan
- Vijay Vasanth as Gajani
- Sagithiya as Meenakshi
- Nancy Jennifer as Priya
- Pavithra as Alamu
- Soumya Bollapragada as Manisha Gupta
- Lakshana
- Vennira Aadai Moorthy
- Delhi Kumar
- Ajay Ratnam
- Kavithalaya Krishnan
- Sashikumar
- Crane Manohar
- Suruli Manohar
- Saakshi Siva
- Nellai Siva
- Munnar Ramesh
- Raviprakash
- Boys Rajan
- Babilona as Saroja
- Suja Varunee (item number)

== Soundtrack ==
Soundtrack was composed by Premji Amaran. It contains a remixed version of "Oru Nayagan" from Dhavanik Kanavugal (1984).

Song	Singer(s)	Lyricist	Duration	Notes
"Vaa Thozha"	Ranjith, Raju Krishnamurthy, Premgi Amaren, Anuradha Sriram	Gangai Amaren	04:35	
"Adiye En Annakili"	Vijay Yesudas, Chinmayi	Snehan	04:38	
"Kaadhal Devathai"	Haricharan, Saindhavi	Premji	04:47	
"Oru Nayagan"	S. P. B. Charan, Venkat Prabhu, Premji Amaren	Vaali	04:00	Remix

== Critical reception ==
Pavithra Srinivasan of Rediff.com wrote, "Imagine a sturdy house, brightly coloured, reasonably proportioned standing on wilting, slender sticks that barely support it amidst swirling flood-waters. That's Arowana Films' Thozha, directed by N Sundareshwaran." Cinesouth wrote, "If the illogical scenes and the drag in screenplay had been avoided, Thozha would have passed the test". S. R. Ashok Kumar of The Hindu wrote, "P. Dana's camera work is commendable but Sundareswaran should have worked more on the screenplay. He should have roped in experienced talent for some of the roles", but appreciated the dialogues.
