= Mugguru =

- Directed by: V. N. Aditya
- Written by: V. N. Aditya
- Produced by: D. Ramanaidu
- Starring: Reema Sen; Navdeep; Shraddha Das; Rahul; Avasarala Srinivas; Sanjjana; Soumya
- Music by: Koti
- Production company: Suresh Productions
- Release date: 14 August 2011
- Country: India
- Language: Telugu

Mugguru (transl. Three) is a 2011 Telugu film directed by V. N. Aditya and produced by D. Ramanaidu's Suresh Productions. The film stars Navdeep, Rahul, Avasarala Srinivas, Shraddha Das, Sanjjana and Sowmya Bollapragada in the titular roles alongside Reema Sen.

== Cast ==
- Reema Sen as Balatripura Sundari
- Navdeep as Pavan
- Rahul as Maruthi
- Avasarala Srinivas as Anji
- Sivaji as Balatripura Sundari's husband (cameo appearance)
- Shraddha Das as Shalini
- Sanjjana as Yamini
- Sowmya as Mohini
- Brahmanandam as Chota Don
- Ali as Bade Miyaa
- Dharmavarapu Subramanyam as Subba Rao
- Ahuti Prasad as JP
- Venu Madhav
- Viswanath Kasi as Balatripura Sundari's uncle
- Thagubothu Ramesh as Chote Miyaa
- Uttej as Job agent
- Raghunatha Reddy

== Production ==
The film was shot for around 25 days in Malaysia, 10 days in Visakhapatnam and the rest of the film was shot in Karamchedu and Hyderabad.

== Soundtrack ==
No.	Title	Singer(s)	Length
1.	"Jillele Jillele"	Srikanth, Simha
2.	"Chiki Bum Bum"	Karthik, Ranjith, Suneetha, Sravana Bhargavi
3.	"Gundeki"	Sri Krishna
4.	"Oja Ye Oje"	Brahmanandham, Karthik, Geetha Madhuri, Malavika
5.	"Gilli Gilli cheapanu"	Karthik, Ranjith, Geetha Madhuri, Malavika
6.	"Mugguru"	Mano

== Reception ==
The film received a mixed response. Super Good Movies called it a desperate attempt to make an enjoyable comedy, and rated it 1.75 out of 5. Radhika Rajamani of Rediff.com rated the film 2 out of 5 stars and wrote, "Mugguru is one of those films which you can see if you have nothing else to do or no other film to watch".
