= The Suspect (2025 film) =

2024 Indian Telugu action thriller film

- Directed by: RadhaKrishna Garnepudi
- Screenplay by: RadhaKrishna Garnepudi
- Story by: RadhaKrishna Garnepudi
- Produced by: G. Kiran Kumar
- Starring: Rushi Kiran; Swetha Ghattamaneni; M Siva Kumar
- Cinematography: Patlolla Raghavendra
- Edited by: Praveen TamTam
- Music by: Prajwal Krish; Vemupati Nithin
- Production company: Temple Town Talkies
- Distributed by: SKML Motions Pictures
- Release date: 21 March 2025
- Running time: 134 minutes
- Country: India
- Language: Telugu

The Suspect is an Indian Telugu-language crime drama released in 2025 and written and directed by Radha Krishna Garnepudi and produced by G. Kiran Kumar under Temple Town Talkies banner. It stars Rushi Kiran in the DCP roles alongside Swetha Ghattamaneni, M. Siva Kumar, Rupa, Rajitha and AKN Prasad.

The film was officially announced on 10 November 2024. The background score and soundtrack were composed by Prajwal Krish and one song is composed by Vemupati Nithin.

== Plot ==
Detective Arjun, a dynamic Narcotics officer, is newly promoted to Deputy Commissioner of Police (DCP) and tasked with solving the mysterious murder of an unidentified young woman. As he and his team delve into the case, Arjun uncovers a web of suspects, including his enigmatic ex-girlfriend, Meera. Each suspect has a motive, making the investigation increasingly complex. The pressure to solve the case is immense, as the victim's anonymity adds a layer of complexity that threatens to derail the inquiry at every turn.

Just as Arjun begins to piece together the truth, he finds himself as a suspect and suspended from duty. Determined to clear his name and to find the real killer, Arjun goes rogue.

In a race against time, he must navigate a maze of deceit to uncover the true culprit and restore justice.

== Cast ==
- Rushi Kiran
- Ghattamaneni Swetha
- Shirigilam Rupa
- Erugurala Rajitha
- Marreboina Shiva Kumar
- A.K.N. Prasad

== Reception ==
Hans India gave 3/5 stars and wrote "With its gripping narrative, well-executed suspense, and strong performances, The Suspect is a must-watch for crime thriller lovers. If you enjoy edge-of-the-seat mysteries, this one is worth your time!"

Deccan Film gave 3/5 stars and wrote, "The Suspect movie is a crime drama with gripping screen play".

News18 Telugu wrote that "Overall, 'The Suspect' film that will appeal all audience. It is a must-see in theaters this weekend."

Indian Herald wrote that "The Suspect movie is best choice for audience who loves the crime thrillers and Crime dramas."
