= Lucky Chance =

- DVD cover
- Directed by: Siva Nageswara Rao
- Written by: Tanikella Bharani (dialogues)
- Screenplay by: Siva Nageswara Rao
- Story by: Malladi Venkata Krishna Murthy; Yerramshetty Sai
- Produced by: C. Sarath Babu
- Starring: Rajendra Prasad; Kanchan
- Cinematography: B. N. Rao
- Edited by: K. Ramesh
- Music by: Sri
- Production company: Sri Madhav Arts
- Release date: 25 August 1994
- Running time: 114 mins
- Country: India
- Language: Telugu

Lucky Chance is a 1994 Telugu-language comedy film, produced by C. Sarath Babu under the Sri Madhav Arts banner and directed by Siva Nageswara Rao. It stars Rajendra Prasad, Kanchan and music composed by Sri. The film was inspired by the 1954 classic movie Chakrapani, which itself was based on Malladi Venkata Krishna Murthy's novel Vitamin M. The film was recorded as a Hit at the box office.

== Cast ==
- Rajendra Prasad as Bose
- Kanchan as Bhanu
- Satyanarayana as Dharma Rao
- Kota Srinivasa Rao as Nayudamma
- Brahmanandam as Dakshina Murthy
- Giri Babu as Seshagiri
- M. Balaiah as Veerabhadram
- A.V.S. as Sivaram
- Dharmavarapu Subramanyam as Manager
- Tanikella Bharani as Anjaneyulu
- Chinna as Rajababu
- Jenny as Lalitha's father
- Kavitha as Bharathi
- Bangalore Padma as Doctor
- Shilpa as Lalitha
- Sandhya as Uma
- Sameera as Dhanalakshmi
- Y. Vijaya as Sivaram's wife

== Soundtrack ==
Lucky Chance

Film score by Sri
- Released: 1994
- Genre: Soundtrack
- Length: 27:32
- Label: Balaji Audio
- Producer: Sri

Music composed by Sri. Lyrics were written by Sirivennela Sitarama Sastry. Music released on Balaji Audio Company.

No.	Title	Singer(s)	Length
1.	"Tatala Naati"	S. P. Balasubrahmanyam	4:16
2.	"Sweety Singarama"	S. P. Balasubrahmanyam, Radhika	4:21
3.	"Ravoyee Chandamama"	Rajendra Prasad, Chitra	5:16
4.	"Aaja Aaja Raja"	Mano, Chitra	6:04
5.	"Jagratha Naa Jolikivasthe"	S. P. Balasubrahmanyam	4:19
6.	"Vudutha Vudutha Huth"	Mano, Chakravarthy	3:16
Total length:			27:32

== Other ==
- VCDs and DVDs on – VOLGA Videos, Hyderabad
