= Love Ke Liye Kuch Bhi Karega =

2001 Hindi film directed by Eeshwar Nivas

- Directed by: Eeshwar Nivas
- Written by: Rajnish Thakur
- Based on: Money by Siva Nageswara Rao
- Produced by: Ram Gopal Varma; Nitin Manmohan
- Starring: Saif Ali Khan; Fardeen Khan; Aftab Shivdasani; Sonali Bendre; Twinkle Khanna; Johnny Lever
- Narrated by: Paresh Rawal
- Cinematography: Venkat Rama Prasad
- Edited by: Bhanodaya
- Music by: Vishal Bhardwaj
- Distributed by: Dream Merchants Enterprise
- Release date: 29 June 2001
- Running time: 131 minutes
- Country: India
- Language: Hindi
- Budget: est. ₹57.5 million
- Box office: est. ₹103.3 million

Love Ke Liye Kuch Bhi Karega (transl. Will do anything for love) is a 2001 Indian Hindi-language crime comedy film directed by Eeshwar Nivas and produced by Ram Gopal Varma and Nitin Manmohan. The film stars Saif Ali Khan, Fardeen Khan, Sonali Bendre, Twinkle Khanna, Aftab Shivdasani and Johnny Lever in lead roles. The film marked Twinkle Khanna's final acting performance, prior to her marriage and subsequent retirement from the industry.

The film is an official remake of the 1993 Telugu film Money. It was released on 29 June 2001 and unlike the original version, the Hindi remake received mixed reviews and eventually became a box-office bomb. The film is said to be partly based on the American black comedy Fargo. Paresh Rawal, who acted as the female lead's husband in the original Telugu film, plays the narrator in the Hindi remake.

== Plot ==
A troubled young man, Prakash, is married to Sapna, who is an artist and the only daughter of a wealthy business tycoon, Rajiv Chopra, and Prakash is his son-in-law. Rajiv Chopra hates Prakash and often troubles him. Tired of being troubled and insulted by Chopra, Prakash plans to have Sapna kidnapped to make his father-in-law feel the way he does. He hires two broke strugglers, Rahul and Harry, who are to be fake kidnappers and kidnap Sapna. Rahul is an unemployed graduate who is seeking employment and is in love with Anjali, the daughter of his landlord, Dakshina Murthi. Murthi makes a condition to let Anjali marry Rahul if he finds a job in one month and pays all his overdue rents. If not, he would make Anjali marry someone else who has a good job. This prompts hopeless and vulnerable Rahul and his roommate Harry to join the fake kidnapping scheme.

The plan succeeds, and Chopra is deceived. Rahul and Harry demand Rs.1 1 crore as ransom money, and the fooled Chopra agrees to pay. As the ransom money has been paid, Rahul and Harry set Sapna free and leave her in a forest, which is also part of Prakash's plan. Prakash arrives at the forest to pick up Sapna; however, he realizes that she has been kidnapped again, but this time by real kidnappers. This crime caper soon turns into one hilarious joy ride!

== Cast ==
- Saif Ali Khan as Prakash Singh
- Fardeen Khan as Rahul Kapoor / Khalid Muhammad
- Aftab Shivdasani as Harilal "Harry" Chaturvedi / Sultan Ahmed
- Twinkle Khanna as Anjali Murthy, Rahul's girlfriend.
- Sonali Bendre as Sapna Chopra, Prakash's wife.
- Dalip Tahil as Rajiv Chopra, Sapna's father.
- Johnny Lever as Aslam Bhai
- Anupam Shyam as Sardar
- Tanikella Bharani as Dakshina Murthy, Anjali's father.
- Sudha as Rameshwari, Anjali's mother.
- Snehal Dabi as Aaj Kapoor
- Sharat Saxena as Police Officer
- Shrivallabh Vyas as Police Commissioner
- Paresh Rawal as Narrator

== Soundtrack ==
Love Ke Liye Kuch Bhi Karega

Soundtrack album by Vishal Bhardwaj
- Released: 21 May 2001
- Genre: Feature film soundtrack
- Label: T-Series

All lyrics are written by Abbas Tyrewala; all music is composed by Vishal Bhardwaj.

No.	Title	Singer(s)	Length
1.	"Aslam Bhai"	Sonu Nigam	03:51
2.	"Love X Crime"	Sonu Nigam, Fareed Sabri	05:23
3.	"Rama Rama"	Sonu Nigam, Asha Bhosle	04:33
4.	"Socho Kya Karogi"	KK, Asha Bhosle	04:18
5.	"Dhan Dhan"	KK	06:44
6.	"Love Ke Liye"	Udit Narayan, Sunidhi Chauhan	05:00
7.	"Dil Mera Dil Hai Akela"	Udit Narayan	04:56

Reviewing the music album for Rediff.com, Sukanya Verma wrote that "Aslam Bhai" song "manages to click" "despite the fact that it has absurd lines".

== Reception ==
Sukanya Verma of Rediff.com opined that the film was "mostly watchable for its bubbling enthusiasm and, of course, Aslambhai". Taran Adarsh of Bollywood Hungama found the film "engaging, but in parts". He was of the view that the film's comedy was similar to that seen in Basu Chatterjee's films and both the actresses; Khanna and Bendre lacked "enough scope" for acting. Amaresh Misra of Outlook stated that Khanna and Bendre had been "wasted" in the film, which lacked of "innovative screenplay".
