= Anaganaga Oka Roju =

1995 film by Ram Gopal Varma

- Film poster
- Directed by: Ram Gopal Varma
- Screenplay by: Ram Gopal Varma
- Story by: Ram Gopal Varma
- Produced by: Ram Gopal Varma; K. L. N. Raju (Presenter)
- Dialogues by: Nadiminti Narsinga Rao
- Starring: J. D. Chakravarthy; Urmila
- Cinematography: Vasu
- Edited by: Bhanodaya
- Music by: Sri Kommineni
- Production company: Varma Creations Production
- Release date: 29 December 1995
- Country: India
- Language: Telugu

Anaganaga Oka Roju (transl. Once upon a day) is a 1995 Indian Telugu-language road action thriller film written, directed and produced by Ram Gopal Varma. Starring J. D. Chakravarthy and Urmila in the lead roles, the film features Raghuvaran, Brahmanandam, and Kota Srinivasa Rao in pivotal roles. Music was composed by Sri Kommineni.

The film received positive reviews from critics and was a commercial success. Brahmanandam's performance earned him the Nandi Award for Best Male Comedian. His character, dialogues, and mannerisms, particularly the line "Nellore Pedda Reddy," became iconic and are frequently shared on Telugu meme pages. Brahmanandam himself has listed the film among his top 11 films in his filmography. The film was later dubbed into Tamil as Andru Oru Naal.

== Plot ==
The film centers on Chakri Bhagavatula (J. D. Chakravarthy) and Madhu Sharma (Urmila Matondkar), two young lovers whose parents constantly fight. Chakri lives with his supportive but helpless parents, (Chalapathi Rao and Uma Sharma), while Madhu faces pressure from her strict parents (K. Chakravarthy and Y. Vijaya). Unable to tolerate the nonstop arguments, the couple decides to run away and get married. On their journey, they cross paths with several eccentric characters, including the Kakatiya College bus conductor (Uttej), a dramatic History Professor of Kakatiya College (Suthi Velu), a dhaba owner (Maanik Rao), a hotel receptionist (Jenny), and a wandering traveler Raja (Kallu Chidambaram), adding humor and unpredictability to their escape.

Parallel to their romantic journey, a major political conspiracy unfolds in the state. The corrupt Chief Minister (Kota Srinivasa Rao) secretly plots the assassination of his rival, Deputy CM Naresh Babu (Avtar Gill). The CM’s inner circle includes his ruthless henchmen Chocolate (Rami Reddy), Narsing (Narsing Yadav), and Ramaraju (Ramaraju)—who later escapes in a Fiat 1100 with a crucial audio tape proving the CM’s guilt—along with another trusted enforcer Tarzan (Laxminarayana). At the top of the political system sits the Governor (Chandrashekhar), unaware of the unfolding scandal.

As the assassination occurs, the police system springs into full action. Police Commissioner (Chalasani Krishna Rao) supervises the investigation, with Inspector Raghuvaran (Raghuvaran) and the Sub-Inspector (Ahuti Prasad) leading the manhunt. A series of misunderstandings causes the police to mistakenly believe that Chakri and Madhu are responsible for the Deputy CM’s murder, turning the innocent lovers into fugitives. Fearing arrest, they continue on the road from Hyderabad to Narsapur town in the same car of Ramaraju, completely unaware of how they got entangled in a high-profile political crime.

Complicating matters further, a parallel comedy unfolds on the same route when small-time thief Nelluru Peddareddy a.k.a. Jackson (Brahmanandam), who incidentally drives another Fiat 1100, and his sidekick (Oru Viral Krishna Rao), casually steal the audio tape, assuming it to be something valuable. Their clueless involvement leads to multiple chases between the police, the CM’s henchmen, the goons from the horrific dhaba gas explosion, Chakri and Madhu, and the desperate criminals—all searching for the incriminating tape, each for different reasons.

Ultimately, the evidence finds its way back into the right hands, and the truth reaches the authorities. The Chief Minister and his corrupt network are exposed and arrested, securing justice. The Governor finally learns of the conspiracy, the police realize Chakri and Madhu are innocent, and both families—after experiencing fear and shock—drop their rivalry and agree to the couple’s marriage. The film ends on a happy and humorous note, uniting the lovers after a chaotic and thrilling journey.

== Cast ==
- J. D. Chakravarthy as Chakri Bhagavatula
- Urmila as Madhu Sharma
- Raghuvaran as Inspector Raghuvaran
- Brahmanandam as Michael Jackson
- Kota Srinivasa Rao as Chief Minister
- Chandrashekhar as Governor
- Avtar Gill as Deputy CM Naresh Babu
- Ahuti Prasad as Sub-Inspector
- Oru Viral Krishna Rao as Jackson's friend
- Chalasani Krishna Rao as Police Commissioner
- Rami Reddy as Chocolate
- Ramaraju as Ramaraju
- Narsing Yadav as Narsing
- Chalapathi Rao as Chakri's father
- Uma Sharma as Chakri's mother
- K. Chakravarthy as Madhu’s father
- Y. Vijaya as Madhu's mother
- Suthivelu as Kakatiya History Professor
- Uttej as Kakatiya Bus conductor
- Kallu Chidambaram as Raja Traveller
- Maanik Rao as Dhaba owner
- Jenny as Hotel Receptionist
- Surya as Tarzan

== Production ==
Anaganaga Oka Roju was produced and directed by Ram Gopal Varma under the Varma Creations banner, with dialogues written by Nadiminti Narsinga Rao.

The concept for the film originated from Ram Gopal Varma, who initially entrusted Krishna Vamsi with directing it, impressed by Vamsi's work on Money Money (1994). Krishna Vamsi suggested the title Anaganaga Oka Roju and began working on the film, which centered around Varma's recurring theme of "a couple on the run."

During production, Krishna Vamsi directed key scenes, including a chase sequence, showcasing his creative approach to the project. However, due to creative differences and escalating production costs, Ram Gopal Varma took over as director after two shooting schedules. Recognizing the financial challenges involved, Krishna Vamsi stepped aside but continued to assist with the project until its completion.

== Music ==
The music was composed by Sri and released by Varma Audio. All lyrics were penned by Sirivennela Seetharama Sastry. The Background score from John Williams's Jurassic Park has been reused in the film's action and chase sequences.

Anaganaga Oka Roju

Soundtrack album by Sri Kommineni
- Released: 1996
- Recorded: 1996
- Genre: Soundtrack
- Length: 26:10
- Label: Varma Audio
- Producer: Sri Kommineni

Sri Kommineni chronology
Sindhooram (1997)	Anaganaga Oka Roju (1996)	Aavida Maa Aavide (1998)

Track list
No.	Title	Singer(s)	Length
1.	"Ema Kopama"	K. S. Chithra, Mano	5:17
2.	"Edo Taha Taha"	Mano, Swarnalatha	4:51
3.	"Love Is Blind"	K. S. Chithra, Mano	5:48
4.	"Oopa Lenayo"	K. S. Chithra, Mano	5:28
5.	"Endhammo"	Mano, Lalitha Sagari	4:43
Total length:			26:10

== Legacy ==
Brahmanandam's character, dialogues, and mannerisms, particularly the line "Nelluru Peddareddy," became iconic and are frequently shared on Telugu meme pages. Brahmanandam himself has listed the film among his top 11 films in his filmography.

== Awards ==
Nandi Awards

- Best Male Comedian - Brahmanandam
