= Kodanda Ramudu =

- Official poster
- Directed by: S. V. Krishna Reddy
- Written by: Diwakar Babu (Dialogue); S. V. Krishna Reddy (story)
- Produced by: Ramakrishna Reddy
- Starring: J. D. Chakravarthy; Rambha; Laya; Brahmanandam
- Cinematography: Sarat
- Edited by: K. Ramgopal Reddy
- Music by: S. V. Krishna Reddy
- Production company: Kanthi Krishna Arts
- Distributed by: Taranga Films
- Release date: 1 January 2000
- Running time: 140 minutes
- Country: India
- Language: Telugu

Kodanda Ramudu is a 2000 Indian Telugu-language romance film, directed by S. V. Krishna Reddy. The film stars J. D. Chakravarthy, Rambha and Laya, with music composed by S. V. Krishna Reddy.

== Plot ==
Kodanda Ramudu, alias Ramu (J. D. Chakravarthy) is a tour guide in Araku Valley Borra Caves and is deeply in love with Mounika (Rambha), a city-bred rich girl who doesn't believe in love. She thinks love is a tool that people use to fulfill their materialistic needs and assumes that Ramu is just pretending to be in love with her. Mounika pretends and encourages Ramu to love her and makes a fool of him by insulting him when he expresses his love to her by bringing the saree weaved for marriage by his Peddamma (Nirmalamma). Enraged at Mounika's treatment, Ramu challenges Mounika that she will come back to him begging for marriage. Meanwhile, Latha (Laya) and Avadhani's (A.V.S.) music and dance troupe come to Araku Valley for annual celebrations. Latha develops an interest towards Ramu and becomes closer to him. When Mounika gets to know from her father (Ranganath) that Latha is the daughter of one of the richest Indians on the Earth for whom her father works, Mounika starts repenting about her decision to reject Ramu. Later, Mounika comes back to Ramu after realising his love and begs him to accept her love. As Ramu rejects Mounika, she makes a last-ditch attempt by going for a suicide at the famous suicide point. The story ends with Ramu saving Mounika and marrying her.

== Cast ==
- J. D. Chakravarthy as Kodanda Ramudu (Ramu)
- Rambha as Mounika
- Laya as Latha
- Saptaparna Saha
- Brahmanandam as Tour Guide
- Ali as Tour Guide
- Sivaji Raja as Ramu's friend
- Kallu Chidambaram as Tourist
- Shanoor Sana as Tourist
- Gautam Raju as Sana's husband
- Raja Ravindra as Kumar
- Subbaraya Sharma as Ramu's father
- Annapurna as Ramu's mother
- M. S. Narayana as Araku Railway Station Master
- A. V. S. as Avadhani, Black Cat Commando
- J. V. Somayajulu as ayurvedic doctor
- Nirmalamma as weaver Peddamma
- Ranganath as Mounika's father
- Surya as Rowdy cum Siva Bhakthudu
- Madhumani as Madhu, Mounika's friend
- Mahitha as Mahitha, Mounika's friend
- Snehitha as Snehitha, Mounika's friend
- Srilakshmi Kulkarni as Srilakshmi, Mounika's friend

== Production ==
Guide was originally preferred as the film's title.

== Music ==
The songs were composed by S. V. Krishna Reddy and lyrics were penned by Veturi and Chandrabose.

No	Song	Artist(s)
1	"Mounika Mounika"	K. S. Chithra, Shankar Mahadevan
2	"Sannajaaji Theega"	M. G. Sreekumar
3	"Kodanda Ramayyaku"	K. S. Chithra, M. G. Sreekumar
4	"Manipuri Nadakalatho"	K. S. Chithra, Shankar Mahadevan
5	"Idhu Kakula Lokamlo"	S. P. Balasubrahmanyam
6	"Ee Lahiri Pade"	K. S. Chithra, Udit Narayan

== Reception ==
Idlebrain wrote "Story is the weak point of the film. The director tried to induct the comedy track (by Brahmanandam and Ali), in vain. First half of the film is dull, sans superb songs. Second half is entertaining, especially the Surya's episode. On a whole this film is a watchable one for the lovers of SV Krishna Reddy films and comedy films". Andhra Today wrote "Having chosen a weak storyline, the director has filled it with vacuous scenes, giving it an eqally listless treatment. [..] The only plus points in the movie are music score by S V Krishna Reddy and photography by Sarath".
