= Jayabheri Arts =

Indian film production company

Sri Jayabheri Art Productions
- Industry: Entertainment
- Founders: Murali Mohan; Jayabheri Kishore Duggirala
- Headquarters: Hyderabad, Telangana, India
- Products: Films
- Services: Film production

Sri Jayabheri Art Productions is a film production company founded by both Murali Mohan and his brother Jayabheri Kishore Duggirala in the Telugu Film Industry. With Murali Mohan as a part of the cast, the executive and production departments were run by his brother.

The company has produced over 25 films. The company also produced Athadu in 2005 which is one of the highest-grossing Telugu films in history, and created a tremendous platform for actor Mahesh Babu.

== Filmography ==
=== Producer ===
Year	Title	Cast	Director	Notes	ref
1980	Ramadandu	Murali Mohan, Saritha, Allu Ramalingaiah, Nirmalamma	NS Mani		
1981	Vaaralabbai	Murali Mohan, Madhavi, Showkar Janaki	Rajachandra		
1982	Pichi Panthulu	Murali Mohan, Madhavi	Rajachandra		
1983	Devi Sridevi	Murali Mohan, Jayasudha, Radhika	Gangai Amaran		
1984	Kutumba Gauravam	Murali Mohan, Vijayashanti	Rajachandra		
1985	O Thandri Theerpu	Murali Mohan, Jayasudha	Rajachandra	Nandi Award for Second Best Feature Film; Nandi Award for Best Actor	
1985	Mugguru Mithrulu	Sobhan Babu, Murali Mohan, Chandra Mohan, Suhasini, Sumalatha	Rajachandra		
1986	Srimathi Garu	Murali Mohan, Jayasudha	Rajachandra		
1986	Ide Naa Samadhanam	Murali Mohan, Madhavi	Rajachandra		
1986	Sravana Megalu	Murali Mohan, Bhanupriya, Lakshmi	Kranthi Kumar	Nandi Award for Best Screenplay Writer; Nandi Award for Best Music Director; Nandi Award for Best Actress; Filmfare Award for Best Actress – Telugu	
1987	Karpoora Deepam	Murali Mohan, Suhasini	Rajachandra		
1987	Nammina Bantu	Murali Mohan, Rajani	Ravi Raja Pinisetty		
1988	Bharatamlo Bala Chandrudu	Nandamuri Balakrishna, Murali Mohan, Bhanupriya, Jayasudha	Kodi Ramakrishna		
1991	Nirnayam	Nagarjuna, Amala Akkineni, Murali Mohan	Priyadarshan		
1992	Pellam Chepithe Vinali	Meena, Harish Kumar, Srikanth, Murali Mohan	Kodi Ramakrishna		
1993	Hendthi Helidare Kelabeku	Malashri, Harish Kumar, Dwarakish	Relangi Narasimha Rao	Kannada	
1993	Rajeswari Kalyanam	Akkineni Nageswara Rao, Vanisri, Suresh, Meena	Kranthi Kumar		
1993	Varasudu	Akkineni Nagarjuna, Krishna, Nagma	E. V. V. Satyanarayana		
1998	Aavida Maa Aavide	Akkineni Nagarjuna, Tabu, Heera Rajagopal	E. V. V. Satyanarayana		
2005	Athadu	Mahesh Babu, Trisha Krishnan, Sonu Sood	Trivikram Srinivas	Filmfare Award for Best Director – Telugu; Nandi Award for Best Actor; Nandi Award for Best Dialogue Writer; Nandi Award for Best Special Effects	

=== Distributor ===
Year	Title	Cast	Director	Notes	ref
1994	Adavallaku Matrame	Nassar, Revathi, Urvashi, Rohini	Singeetam Srinivasa Rao	Dubbed Version of Magalir Mattum in Telugu	
1997	Iddaru		Mani Ratnam	Dubbed version of Iruvar	
