= J. D. Chakravarthy =

Indian actor, filmmaker, screenwriter, musician (born 1970)

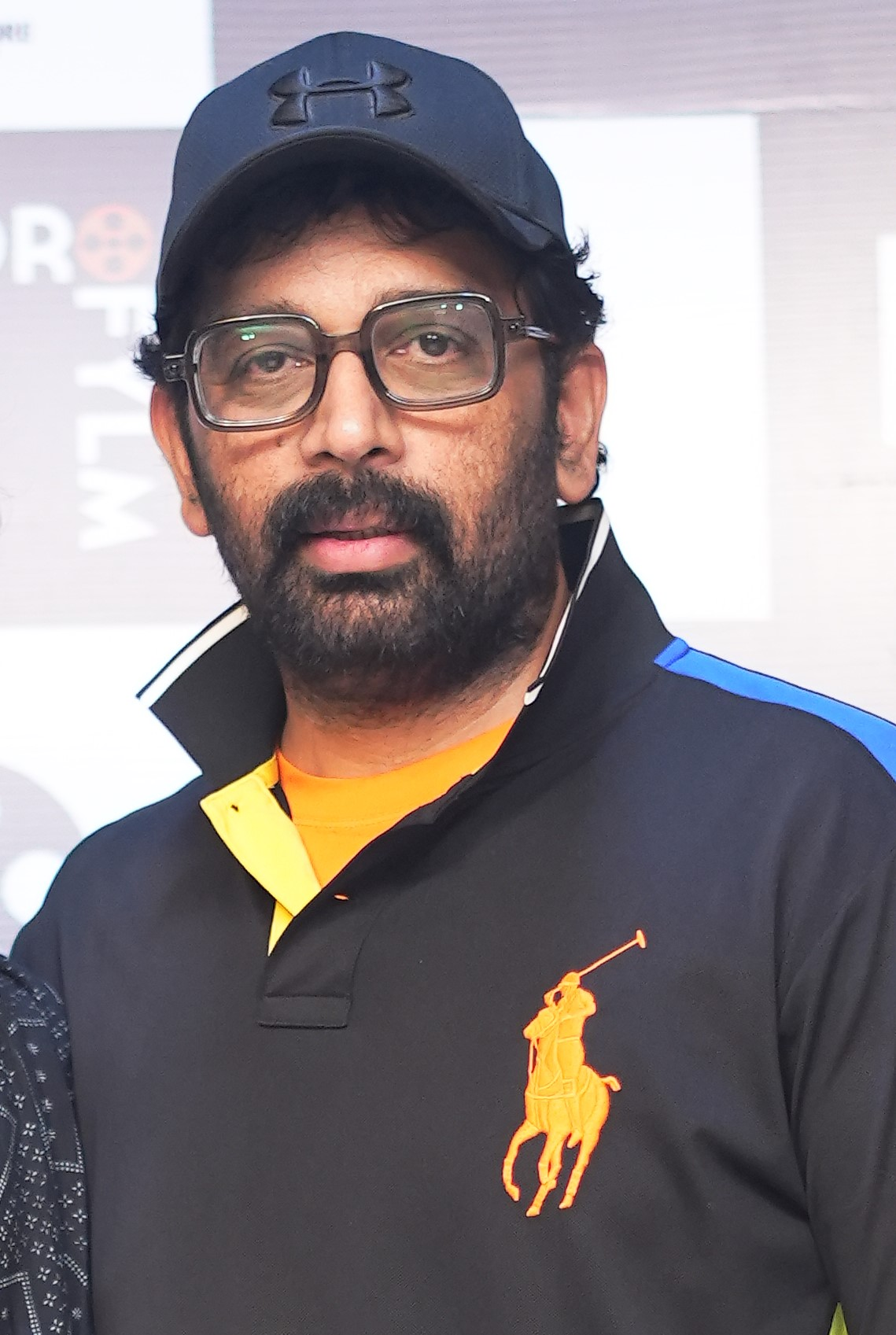
- Chakravarthy in 2023
- Born: Nagulapati Srinivasa Chakravarthy; 16 April 1970 (age 56); Hyderabad, Andhra Pradesh, India (currently Telangana, India)
- Education: Chaitanya Bharathi Institute of Technology
- Occupations: Actor; filmmaker; screenwriter; musician
- Years active: 1989–present
- Spouse: Anukriti Govind Sharma (m. 2016)

Nagulapati Srinivasa Chakravarthy, known professionally as J. D. Chakravarthy, is an Indian actor, filmmaker, screenwriter and musician known for his work primarily with Telugu cinema in addition to Hindi, Tamil, and Malayalam films. Chakravarthy made his screen debut with the Telugu film, Siva, an action blockbuster directed by Ram Gopal Varma, featured at the 12th IFFI. He subsequently made his Bollywood debut with the remake of the same film titled Shiva (1990). He then starred in the blockbuster Satya, featured in the Indian panorama section at the 29th IFFI, and was listed among CNN-IBN's 100 greatest Indian films of all time.

Chakravarthy starred in more than seventy feature films in a variety of roles predominantly in Telugu, Hindi and a few Tamil, and Malayalam films. He is best known for his performances in box office hits like Neti Siddhartha (1990), Money (1993), One by Two (1993), Money Money (1994), Gulabi (1995), Bombay Priyudu (1996), Anaganaga Oka Roju (1997), Egire Paavurama (1997), Nenu Premisthunnanu (1997), Premaku Velayara (1999), Pape Naa Pranam (2000), Madhyanam Hathya (2004), and Dayaa (2023). He won the Nandi Special Jury Award, Screen Award Special Jury Award and Best Supporting Actor Award at the Eko International Film Festival for Gulabi (1995), Satya, (1998), and Dahini: The Witch (2022) respectively.

== Early life ==
Chakravarthy was born into a Telugu speaking family of carnatic singer Prof. Dr. Kovela Shantha, and father Nagulapati Suryanarayana Rao. He was born in Hyderabad, India. His elder sister Vijayanthi is settled in the United States. He did his schooling in St. George's Grammar School (Hyderabad), and completed B. E. from Chaitanya Bharathi Institute of Technology.

== Career ==
He debuted in 1989 through Ram Gopal Verma's debut Telugu film, Siva as J.D., as one of the student leaders, and in the same year appeared in a supporting role in the Malayalam film Ennodu Ishtam Koodamo before devoting all his time to films under his mentor's Ram Gopal Varma 's production.

He has worked in many Telugu films directed by ace film makers of the time like Mani Ratnam, Krishna Vamsi, S. V. Krishna Reddy, K. Raghavendra Rao, Kodi Ramakrishna, E. V. V. Satyanarayana, Siva Nageswara Rao, Gunasekhar, and Vamsy. His first Hindi film in a lead role, Satya, was critically acclaimed and became a commercial blockbuster. In 2002, he played a role of Sri Lankan Tamil Eelam fighter Dileepan, in Mani Ratnam's Tamil film, Kannathil Muthamittal.

He also starred in Hindi films like Vaastu Shastra, and Aag alongside Sushmita Sen, and Bhoot Returns alongside Manisha Koirala. He made his film directing debut, with Darwaaza Bandh Rakho and anthology film Darna Zaroori Hai got archived at the New York Institute of Technology, New York, America as part of the film course

He has returned to Telugu film industry with Homam as a director and actor in the year 2008. He then went on to direct Siddham. He had a role in director Vishnuvardhan's Tamil film Sarvam, starring Arya and Trisha. In 2016, he has appeared in the Malayalam film Bhaskar the Rascal pairing with Nayanthara also starring Mammootty. Then he played a young army officer in another Malayalam film Shikhamani, and made his Kannada film debut with the unreleased Raavani alongside Pooja Gandhi.

== Filmography ==
List of J. D. Chakravarthy Telugu film credits
Year	Title	Role	Language	Notes
1989	Shiva	J. Durga Rao / JD	Telugu	
1990	Neti Siddhartha	Chakravarthy	Telugu	
1990	Shiva	Jagadish Dave / JD	Hindi	
1991	Srivari Chindhulu		Telugu	
1991	Atiradhudu	Venky	Telugu	
1991	Prem Qaidi	Prabhavati's son	Hindi	
1992	Ennodishtam Koodamo	Renjith Lal	Malayalam	
1992	Lathi	Ramana	Telugu	
1992	Akka Chellillu		Telugu	
1993	Rakshana		Telugu	
1993	Adarsham	Prem	Telugu	
1993	Prathap	Vimal Raj	Tamil	
1993	Inspector Ashwini		Telugu	
1993	Money	Chakri	Telugu	
1993	One By Two	Balaji	Telugu	
1994	Money Money	Chakri	Telugu	Also playback singer
1995	Gulabi	Chandu	Telugu	
1996	Mrugam		Telugu	
1996	Deyyam	Narsing	Telugu	
1996	Bombay Priyudu	Chitti Babu / J. D.	Telugu	
1996	Anaganaga Oka Roju	Chakri	Telugu	
1997	Egire Paavurama	Siva	Telugu	
1997	Nenu Premisthunnanu	Chakri	Telugu	
1997	Wife of V. Varaprasad	Thyagaraju	Telugu	
1998	Satya	Satya	Hindi	Screen Award Special Jury Award
1998	Pape Naa Pranam	Chakri	Telugu	
1999	Harischandraa	Harishchandra "Hari"	Telugu	
1999	Premaku Velayara	Manohar	Telugu	
2000	Akka Bava Ekkada	Suryam	Telugu	
2000	Maa Pelliki Randi	Kumar	Telugu	
2000	Soori	Soori	Telugu	
2000	Kodanda Ramudu	Kodanda Ramudu (Ramu)	Telugu	
2001	Navvuthu Bathakalira	Ganesh	Telugu	
2002	Premaku Swagatham	Balaji	Telugu	
2002	Kannathil Muthamittal	Dileepan	Tamil	
2002	Durga	Durga	Hindi	
2003	Golmaal	Ameer Khan	Telugu	
2004	Kaasi	Kaasi	Telugu	
2004	Madhyanam Hathya	Ravi Kumar	Telugu	
2004	Vaastu Shastra	Virag Rao	Hindi	
2007	Dubai Seenu	Chakri	Telugu	
2007	Aag	Subbu	Hindi	
2008	Homam	Chandrashekhar aka Chandu	Telugu	
2009	Sarvam	Eashwar	Tamil	
2009	Josh	Durga Rao	Telugu	
2010	Kacheri Arambam	Sivamani	Tamil	
2011	Money Money, More Money	Chakri	Telugu	
2012	All the Best	Chandu	Telugu	
2012	Bhoot Returns	Tarun Awasthi	Hindi	
2013	Samar	John Frederick	Tamil	
2014	Arima Nambi	Rishi Dev	Tamil	
2014	Ice Cream 2	Sikka	Telugu	
2015	Bhaskar the Rascal	Sanjay Sharma	Malayalam	
2015	Dynamite	Rishi Dev	Telugu	
2016	Zero	Solomon	Tamil	
2016	Shikhamani	Anti-terrorist squadron leader	Malayalam	
2017	Nakshatram	Ramachandra Naidu	Telugu	
2018	Marainthirunthu Paarkum Marmam Enna	Dilip Chakravarthy	Tamil	
2019	Mikhael	Muhammad Easa	Malayalam	
2019	Hippi	Hippi's boss	Telugu	
2022	Oppanda	Chakri	Kannada	
2022	Anek	Anjaiah Bellamkonda IPS	Hindi	
2022	Ek Villain Returns	ACP V.K. Ganesan	Hindi	
2022	Kaari	SKR	Tamil	
2022	Dahini: The Witch	Pratap	Hindi	
2026	Gaayapadda Simham	Brutal Dharma	Telugu	
2026	Enemy of the Smuggler	Lingam	Tamil	
2027	Thulabaram †	Sivaji Rao	Telugu	
TBA	Jhatasya Maranam Dhruvam	Shravan Jonnada	Telugu	

=== Other credits ===
Year	Film	Credited as			Language	Notes
Year	Film	Director	Writer	Producer	Language	Notes
1998	Pape Naa Pranam			Yes	Telugu	
2000	Suri		Uncredited		Telugu	
2002	Durga	Yes	Yes	Yes	Hindi	
2006	Darna Zaroori Hai	Yes			Hindi	Anthology film, segment: "A Bride's Revenge"
2006	Darwaaza Bandh Rakho	Yes	Screenplay		Hindi	
2008	Homam	Yes	Yes		Telugu	
2009	Sidham	Yes	Yes		Telugu	
2011	Money Money, More Money	Yes	Yes		Telugu	
2012	All the Best	Yes	Yes		Telugu	Remake, original story writer not credited

=== Television ===
Year	Title	Role	Language	Network
2023	Taaza Khabar	Shetty	Hindi	Disney+Hotstar
2023	Dayaa	Dayaa	Telugu	Disney+Hotstar
