= Priyanka (2016 film) =

- Directed by: Dinesh Babu
- Written by: Dinesh Babu
- Produced by: A. Mohan
- Starring: Priyanka Upendra; Tejas; Prakash Raj
- Cinematography: Dinesh Babu
- Edited by: Ravichandra
- Music by: Krupakar
- Production company: Sai Sree Enterprises
- Release date: 5 February 2016
- Country: India
- Language: Kannada

Priyanka is a 2016 Indian Kannada language thriller film written and directed by Dinesh Babu and produced by A. Mohan. Based on a real-life incident occurred in Bengaluru, the film stars Priyanka Upendra and Tejas in the lead roles. Prakash Raj plays a special role of an investigator in the film.The music is composed by Krupakar and cinematography is by the director, Babu.

Filming began in the November month of 2014 and took a single stretch of 32 days to complete. However, the film could not release for a long time. After multiple announcements of the release dates, the film released on 5 February 2016.

== Cast ==
- Priyanka Upendra as Priyanka
- Tejas as Ashwath Rayappa
- Prakash Raj as ACP Satya Nadig
- Shivadhwaj as Siddanth aka Siddu, Priyanka's husband
- Abhilash
- Avinash as Ashwath's father
- Sumithra
- Veena Sundar as ACP Malathi Hosamane
- Jayashree Raj

== Production ==
Director Dinesh Babu announced the project soon after the release of his directorial Athi Aparoopa in 2014. Roping in actress Priyanka Upendra, he chose to keep the title name as Priyanka as he felt it would connect to the story. The film is said to be shot in an 8K resolution camera, capturing the real event incident that occurred in Bengaluru city. The director also gave a hint that the film would highlight both the pros and cons of the social networking sites such as Facebook, Twitter and Instagram.

== Soundtrack ==
Priyanka

Soundtrack album by Krupakar
- Released: November 2015
- Recorded: 2015
- Genre: Feature film soundtrack

M. N. Krupakar composed the music for the film and the soundtracks, also writing the lyrics for soundtracks. The album has three soundtracks.

No.	Title	Lyrics	Singer(s)	Length
1.	"Priyanka"	Keshav Chandra	Unni Menon
2.	"Gange Thayane"	Keshav Chandra	K. S. Chithra, Unni Menon
3.	"Oh Geleya"	Keshav Chandra	K. S. Chithra, Unni Menon
