= Snehal Dabi =

Indian actor (born 1977)

- Occupation: Actor
- Years active: 1997–present

Snehal Dabi is an Indian actor, writer, director, and producer born into a Gujarati family and brought up in Mumbai. He has been a theater performer since his school days. He has performed in Hindi language films, Marathi, and Gujarati commercial theatre.

== Career ==
Dabi studied electronics engineering from B.V.I.T. CBD Belapur. He debuted in Mahanta then Satya during his college, He also assisted in writing of Hera Pheri. He has studied screenplay-writing and direction from London film academy. He debuted as a writer in Darwaza bandh rakho. His characters became popular as Chandar in Satya, Aaj Kapoor in Love Ke Liye Kuch Bhi Karega, Habiba in Ek Chalis Ki Last Local, electric Baba in Wednesday, and more. He has acted in films like excuse me, welcome, mast, Hera Pheri, EMI, and Pyare Mohan. Dabi's banner The Outstanding Production, has produced short films, music videos, and commercial. The outstanding production has also produced a Hindi feature film Utaavle Baawale in association with Ramayan Chitra.

== Selected filmography ==
- All films are in Hindi, unless otherwise noted.

Year	Film	Role	Notes
1998	Satya	Chander Krishnakanth Khote	
1999	Mast	Autorickshaw driver	
2000	Hera Pheri		
2000	Suri		Telugu film
2001	Love Ke Liye Kuch Bhi Karega	Aaj Kapoor	
2002	Ab Ke Baras		
2002	Durga		
2003	Xcuse Me	Sahiba	
2004	Shart: The Challenge		
2005	James	Babloo	
2005	Divorce: Not Between Husband and Wife	Raju	
2005	Deewane Huye Paagal	Kutti Anna	
2006	Pyare Mohan	Tiny	
2006	Darwaza Bandh Rakho	Goga	Also dialogue writer
2007	Ek Chalis Ki Last Local	Habiba	
2007	Welcome	Majnu's goon	
2008	A Wednesday!	Shambhu "Electric Baba"	
2008	EMI	Mumbai Central	
2009	Luck	Jiten	
2009	Meri Padosan	Prem promotor	
2014	Mr Joe B. Carvalho	General Kopa Bhalerao Kabana	
2015	Welcome Back	Majnu's goon	
2022	Bachchhan Paandey	Jumbo	
2025	Bhagwat Chapter One : Rakshas	Khalid	
