= Pape Naa Pranam =

- Directed by: B. V. Ramana
- Produced by: N. Ramadas Naidu
- Starring: J. D. Chakravarthy; Meena; Ashish Vidyarthi; Kota Srinivasa Rao; Jaya Sudha; Chandra Mohan; Baby Ayushi
- Cinematography: A. Srinivasa Reddy
- Music by: Koti
- Release date: 16 October 1998
- Country: India
- Language: Telugu

Pape Naa Pranam (transl. My daughter is my life) is a 1998 Indian Telugu-language thriller film starring J. D. Chakravarthy and Meena. The film initially released without a title with the director stating that he would rename the film in fifteen days after the release based on the audience's opinion.

It is a remake of the 1995 American film Nick of Time. The film was dubbed into Hindi and Tamil as Aaj Ka Baadshah and Kolai Kutram, respectively.

== Plot ==
Chakravarty (J. D. Chakravarty) is a bank employee. Having lost his wife Padma (Meena) in an accident, his only companion in the world is his four-year-old daughter Vyjayanthi "Vyju". He comes to Hyderabad on transfer from Vizag. The moment Chakravarty alights from the train two people, Eshwar (Ashish Vidyarthi) and Banarjee (Banarjee), come posing as police officers come to check his luggage.

They whisk them away to a van and give him an envelope containing photos and give him two hours to kill the person in the photo. The ransom is his daughter's life. Left with no alternative, Chakravarty goes to the hotel where his victim is and is both shocked and scared on realizing that the person to be killed is the Governor of the state. But Eshwar, who accompanies him, urges him to kill the Governor or lose his daughter.

The remaining part of the film is shot in the hotel. Will Chakravarty kill the Governor? Will he be able to save his daughter? Who is behind the murder? All the questions will be answered in the end.

== Cast ==
- J. D. Chakravarthy as Chakravarthy "Chakri", Asst. Manager at Bank of Maharashtra
- Meena as Padma, Chakri's wife
- Ashish Vidyarthi as Eshwar
- Kota Srinivasa Rao as Shopkeeper
- Jaya Sudha as Governor Sumitra Devi
- Chandra Mohan as Madan Mohan
- Baby Ayushi as Vyjayanthi "Vyju"
- Banerjee as Banerjee
- Chandini as Sanjana
- Uttej as Waiter
- Tanikella Bharani as Komaraiah
- AVS as Hotel Manager JB Anand
- M. S. Narayana as Drunkard
- Chakrapani as Police Commissioner
- Ali as Chef
- Sunil as Waiter
- Kalpana Rai as Housekeeping Staff
- Sivaji Raja as Bose
- Gautham Raju as Auto Driver
- Ramjagan as Jagan
- Raghunatha Reddy as Padma's father
- Ironleg Sastri as Chef
- Tirupathi Prakash as Chef
- Potti Veeraiah as Chef
- Junior Relangi as Chef
- Sobhan as News Cameraman (uncredited)
- Tenali Shakunthala
- Chitti Babu
- Indu Anand
- S. J. Bisku

== Music ==
Pape Na Pranam

Film score by Koti
- Released: 1998
- Genre: Soundtrack
- Label: Aditya Music

Koti chronology
Subhavartha (1998)	Pape Na Pranam (1998)	Subhalekhalu (1998)

No.	Title	Singer(s)	Length
1.	"Alli Billi Oohallo"	S. P. Balasubrahmanyam, S. Janaki	04:19
2.	"Yede Mounam"	S. P. Balasubrahmanyam, S. Janaki	03:37
3.	"Chetti Potti"	S. P. Balasubrahmanyam, S. Janaki	04:34
4.	"Vidhio Gaayama"	S. P. Balasubrahmanyam, S. Janaki	04:44
5.	"Gaya Naala Kegina"	S. P. Balasubrahmanyam, S. Janaki	04:38

== Release and reception ==
The film initially released without a title with the director stating that he would rename the film in fifteen days after the release based on the audience's opinion.

A critic from Zamin Ryot wrote that "Despite the name, the film is great!" Andhra Today wrote "The most important part of a suspense movie is narration of the story and the director used all his skills to sustain the storyline and the suspense. The comedy track, though irrelevant, serves to ease the tension. The film has all the nine emotions, all of which are portrayed excellently by the director. Histrionicswise everyone did exceedingly well".
