= China Town (2011 film) =

- Theatrical release poster
- Directed by: Rafi Mecartin
- Written by: Rafi Mecartin
- Produced by: Antony Perumbavoor
- Starring: Mohanlal; Jayaram; Dileep
- Cinematography: Alagappan N.
- Edited by: Don Max
- Music by: Jassie Gift
- Production company: Aashirvad Cinemas
- Distributed by: Maxlab Cinemas and Entertainments
- Release date: 14 April 2011
- Running time: 150 minutes
- Country: India
- Language: Malayalam
- Budget: ₹6 crores

China Town is a 2011 Indian Malayalam-language action comedy film written and directed by the Rafi Mecartin duo and produced by Antony Perumbavoor under the company Aashirvad Cinemas. The film stars Mohanlal, Jayaram, Dileep and Kavya Madhavan in the lead roles alongside of ensemble cast including Suraj Venjaramoodu,Poonam Bajwa, Dipa Shah, Pradeep Rawat, Captain Raju, Shanavas and Shankar plays the supporting roles. The film also features a sumo wrestler played by D'souza Libor. Jagathy Sreekumar makes a cameo appearance. The film is loosely based on The Hangover.

The plot follows Mathukutty, Zachariah, and Binoy from Kerala, who reached Chinatown in Goa to claim the ownership of their family's Casino but inadvertently there they get embroiled with local mafia and drug dealers led by Gowda, a criminal who killed their parents. The film was released on 14 April 2011 in India. Despite receiving mixed reviews from critics, the film was a blockbuster at the box office.

== Plot ==
Four friends, Xavier, Wilson Gomez, Jayakrishnan and David bought a casino and were celebrating the profits with their families when a powerful politician, Gowda, who used to have a monopoly on the casinos in Goa, intrudes. Xavier held out against the Gowda. Although he, Jayakrishnan and David were killed, he managed to hold off the gang long enough for all of their wives to escape with the children. Gomez survives and settles in Goa with his daughter, Emily.

26 Years later, Xavier's son Mathukutty became a local don. His brother had eloped with a girl from the medical college and he lives with Rosamma, whose father has raised both the brothers. He was attending a retreat in rehabilitation to get rid of his thugish and alcoholic life. David's son Zachariah became a money-minded man. Jayakrishnan's son Binoy became a lovesick youth, who was the victim of six love failures. Gomez sends each of them a letter stating that he had bought a casino and wanted to share the profit between the sons of his friends.

The three meet Gowda, who is now a minister in Goa, who places them in prison under a false drug case. They get out by selling their casino. They decide to avenge their family's death and finally Gowda gets arrested.

== Cast ==
- Mohanlal in a dual role as:
  - Mathukutty (son)
  - Xavier (father)
- Jayaram as Zachariah, Mathukutty's friend
- Dileep as Binoy, Mathukutty's friend
- Kavya Madhavan as Rosamma,Mathukutty's love interest (voiceover by Devi.s)
- D'Souza Libor as a sumo wrestler
- Pradeep Rawat as Gowda, the main antagonist (voiceover by Shobi Thilakan)
- Captain Raju as Wilson Gomez, Emily’s father
  - Deepu Karunakaran as young Gomez
- Suraj Venjaramoodu as Chandran Valanjavazhi (CV)
- Poonam Bajwa as Emily, Gomez’s daughter and Zachariah's love interest
- Dipa Shah as Chandini, Home Minister’s daughter and Binoy’s love interest (voiceover by Vimmy Mariyam George)
- Shankar as Jayakrishnan, Binoy’s father
- Shanavas as David, Zachariah’s father
- Jagathy Sreekumar as Jaggu Bhai, a local don (cameo appearance)
- Shivani Bhai as Honey
- Bharat Dabholkar as the Home Minister, Chandini’s father (voiceover by Vijay Menon).
- Nandu as Fr. Stephen
- Kollam Ajith as Mathukutty’s rival
- Appa Haja as ACP Sandeep Kumar IPS
- Manoj as Advocate Daniel
- Indulekha as Binoy’s ex-lover
- Ranjini Haridas as herself, television anchor of Idea Star Singer (season 5) (cameo appearance)

== Production ==
In August 2010, it was reported that Mohanlal, Jayaram, and Dileep will come together with Suraj Venjaramoodu in a film titled China Town to be directed by the Rafi Mecartin duo and produced by Antony Perumbavoor for the company Aashirvad Cinemas. The duo themselves wrote the screenplay, which was initially meant for Mohanlal alone, but as the plot developed it required two more actors in the lead roles and Dileep and Jayaram was approached. China Town began production on 20 December 2010. Filming began in Ooty, Tamil Nadu. Principal photography took place mainly at the Ramoji Film City, Hyderabad. The set was made by art director Boban. Some parts were filmed in Goa and Ernakulam.

== Soundtrack ==
China Town

Soundtrack album by Jassie Gift
- Released: 11 March 2011
- Genre: Film soundtrack
- Length: 20:45
- Labels: Mathrubhumi Music; Satyam Audios
- Producer: Jassie Gift

Jassie Gift chronology
| Pokkiri Raja (2010) | China Town (2011) | Shyloo (2011) |

The film's music was then composed by Jassie Gift. The lyrics were by Anil Panachooran and Santhosh Varma. The audio release function was held at Kadavu Resorts, Kozhikode, on 2 March 2011. Jassie reused his tune "Gaganave Baagi" from the Kannada film Sanju Weds Geetha for the song "Arike Ninnalum".

| No. | Title | Singer(s) | Length |
|---|---|---|---|
| 1. | "Innu Penninu" | Jassie Gift, Manjari, Rajalakshmi | 5:26 |
| 2. | "Arike Ninnalum" | M. G. Sreekumar, K. S. Chithra | 4:41 |
| 3. | "Aaraanu Koottu" | Afsal, Pradeep Palluruthy, Jassie Gift | 4:21 |
| 4. | "Mohapattam" | Afsal, Jassie Gift, Ranjith, Rijiya | 4:56 |
| 5. | "Aaraanu" | Kavalam Sreekumar | 1:46 |

== Reception ==
=== Critical reception ===
China Town received mixed reviews from critics, with praise on the cast performance, comedy scenes and music, but received criticism for the screenplay. Veeyen of Nowrunning.com rated the film 2/5 and said "Despite the spectacular star cast Chinatown, is yet another comedy from Rafi Mecartin. It's a mishmash of second hand ideas that have long had their run in movies." Paresh C. Pallicha of Rediff also gave the film a 2/5 rating and said, "The film virtually piggybacks on the stars to get the momentum as there is no script to speak of. The duo Rafi Mecartin that was known for their comical writing in the nineties has now reached a stage where they borrow dialogues from email forwards. That's the sorry state of the film. It will be futile to dwell on the performance of the actors as there is no solid material to back them. This one's a no-brainer and can be watched if you are not looking for thought-provoking stuff." The reviewer of Sify said, "Chinatown works fine, if you leave your brains back home. It belongs to the 'don't think too much about what is happening' kind, which defies logic but leaves you in splits at times.". The New Indian Express wrote that "The movie has a good sense of pacing in the first half, but fails to up the ante" and that Mohanlal is "quite impressive", Jayaram is okay, Dileep with his comedy numbers, is "the live element in the movie", and concluded that "Overall, Chinatown, which could have been a lot more, in absence of genuineness, ends up being a 'fan' carnival than a fun carnival".

=== Box office ===
The film was made at a budget of ₹7 crore (US$730,000). The film which had 500 shows per day, covered its production cost in just two weeks run. It got a distributor's share over ₹5.5 crore (US$570,000). And grossed ₹9.2 crore (US$960,000) within one month. The Economic Times called it a "blockbuster film".
