= Divorce: Not Between Husband and Wife =

Divorce
- film poster
- Directed by: M.J. Ramanan
- Written by: Lajan; Sandeep; Athindran Srinivasan
- Story by: M.J. Ramanan
- Produced by: M.J. Ramanan
- Starring: Parth Dave; Sonu Sood; Mandira Bedi; Tannishtha Chatterjee; Snehal Dabi
- Cinematography: Vijaysri
- Edited by: Suresh Urs
- Music by: Ilaiyaraaja
- Production company: V for U Films
- Release date: December 2005 (India Limited release)
- Running time: 140 minutes
- Country: India
- Language: Hindi
- Budget: Rs

Divorce: Not Between Husband and Wife (aka Meri Bhi Suno or Divorcee) is a 2005 Indian Hindi-language drama film directed by M. J. Ramanan as his first feature project, starring Jackie Shroff, Tannishtha Chatterjee, and Rajendranath Zutshi. The film went into post-production in December 2004, and had limited theatrical release in 2005 in order to qualify for the National Film Awards, The film is awaiting wider theatrical release.

== Synopsis ==
8-year-old Pranav (Parth Dave) is the only son of a rich couple Sidharth (Sonu Sood) and Vaidehi (Mandira Bedi). Sidharth works for a multinational company as an officer whose job requires a lot of traveling. In a way, Sidharth is also obsessed with his job and, therefore, is unable to give any time to his child and wife. Vaidehi, on the other hand, is a highly skilled and dedicated media correspondent working for a private channel. She also faces the same problem of giving time to her child and husband. They are running with the mechanized professional objectives like any other conventional human beings of the contemporary age.

The end result is that Pranav misses out on his parents and becomes a victim of suppressed emotions. Meanwhile, Pranav gains the friendship of his neighbor, Jackie (Jackie Shroff), a loner. An advocate by profession, Jackie is also a hardcore alcoholic with a very cool and unconventional attitude towards life. This growing intimacy between the two of them creates insecurity in the minds of Sidharth and Vaidehi, who try various means to deviate Pranav, but their attempts make Pranav more intimate to Jackie. During one of Jackie's court sessions, Pranav accompanies Jackie to watch the proceedings. The case is about a divorce between a husband and a wife. Pranav asks the meaning for the word "divorce," and Jackie explains that it is a separation between two people who do not like each other. For the first time, Pranav asks whether he can get divorced from his parents since he does not like them.

Though Pranav did not mean what he said, Jackie is shocked and convinces Pranav against it. In another incident that follows, Shyam (Rajendranath Zutshi), a drug addict and a resident of the apartment building in which Pranav resides, commits suicide due to a failed relationship. Pranav understands from a depressed old man that suicide is "freedom from all worries." These incidents create an indelible mark in the mind of Pranav, who thereafter threatens Jackie that he would commit suicide if he was not getting a divorce from his parents. Jackie conveys the seriousness to his parents. Sidharth and Vaidehi plan come home early in turns, but they still do not address the actual problems of Pranav, who wants to share a lot with his parents. But as a result of the professional demands, Sidharth and Vaidehi start quarreling with each other for not sticking on to their plan.

Now Pranav decides to campaign for the divorce with all his heart. Jackie is unable to convince Pranav this time and agrees to take up the case on Pranav's behalf for granting the separation. As an outcome the Judge (Reema Lagoo) instructs the government to devise a new penal code to handle the case where the kid himself can file a complaint against his parents. The new penal code is created, and the final verdict by the Judge becomes the climax of the film.

== Cast ==
- Parth Dave as Pranav Joshi
- Sonu Sood as Siddharth Joshi
- Mandira Bedi as Vaidehi Joshi
- Jackie Shroff as Jackie
- Tannishtha Chatterjee as Kamla
- Snehal Dabi as Raju
- Reema Lagoo as Judge
- Shri Vallabh Vyas as Veda
- Rajendranath Zutshi as Shyam
- Musthafa as Nimith

== Production ==
Director Ramanan denied that his film drew inspirations from Masoom, Akele Hum Akele Tum and Rahul, other projects which reflected the emotions of a neglected child, and stated that his sole inspiration came after reading a U.S. newspaper report about a youngster seeking a legal divorce from his parents on the grounds of neglect. The film was shot between 9 February – 12 March 2004, and was submitted for consideration to the 52nd National Film Awards.
