= Naga Bhairavi =

2020 Indian Telugu language fantasy soap opera

- Genre: Fantasy; Supernatural
- Written by: Dialogues; Gopi Venkatesh
- Story by: Dasam Venkatrao
- Directed by: V V Varananjaneyulu
- Starring: Pawon; Yashmi Gowda; Ramya Krishna; Kalki Raja; Ashwini
- Theme music composer: Gopi Sundar
- Opening theme: "Raave Bhairavi"
- Composer: Gopi Sundar
- Country of origin: India
- Original language: Telugu
- No. of seasons: 1
- No. of episodes: 270

Production
- Producers: Pawon; Kalki Raja
- Cinematography: Mujeer Malik
- Editor: Ramcharan Kulkarni
- Camera setup: Multi-camera
- Running time: 25-27 minutes

Original release
- Network: Zee Telugu
- Release: 12 October 2020 – 21 August 2021

Naga Bhairavi is an Indian Telugu-language fantasy television series starring Pawon, Yashmi Gowda, Kalki Raja and Ashwini in lead roles. It started airing from 12 October 2020 and ended on 21 August 2021 on Zee Telugu and also available on ZEE5, even before TV telecast.

== Plot ==
Nagarjuna has recurring dreams about entering a prohibited area in a forest where he meets Bhairavi and gets chased by cobras. Bhairavi comes to India without her family's knowledge and Bhairavi loses her sacred bangle, Nagarjuna finds it. Then they will come close then they will find their brother but their father dies.

== Cast ==
=== Main ===
- Pawon as Nagarjuna
- Yashmi Gowda as Bhairavi
- Kalki Raja as Nagulu
- Ashwini as Malli

=== Recurring ===
- K. Sivasankar as Shivudu
- Rishi Gowd as Bujji
- Sarath as Jeevan Rao
- Vijay Ranga Raju as Maantrikudu
- Chinna as Veerabhadram
- Sravani as Saanvi
- Shruti as Kousalya
- Tanishka as Chinni
- Jackie as Krishnama Naidu
- Uma Reddy as Ambujam
- Varun as Satish
- Madhu Reddy as Viswambara
- Avinash as Sundaram
- Namrata as Sravani
- Swapna as Zareena
- Priyanka Chowdary as Maya
- Kaushik as Bhairavi's brother
- Janaki Verma as Arjun's mother (present)
- Vijaya as Arjun's mother (past)

=== Special appearances ===
- Ramya Krishna
- Bhavana as Soothsayer
- Prajwal as Lord Shiva
- Anusha Hegde as Goddess Parvati
- Sruthi Singampalli as Maantrikuralu
- Sreevani as Kamadhenu

== Dubbed version ==
This serial dubbed in Kannada with the same title on Zee Kannada from 8 March 2021 to 14 November 2021. This serial is also dubbed in Malayalam with the title Nagadevatha on Zee Keralam from 19 September 2022 to 30 March 2023.

== Production ==
This is a fantasy and super natural television show produced by Pawon and Kalki Raja under the banner team 27 pictures.

== Title song ==
The title song was written by Ramajogayya Sastry and composed by Gopi Sundar

Track list
No.	Title	Lyrics	Music	Singer(s)	Length
1.	"Raave Bhairavi" (Title song)	Ramajogayya Sastry	Gopi Sundar	Mangli	2:13
