= Durga (2002 film) =

- DVD cover
- Directed by: J. D. Chakravarthy
- Written by: J. D. Chakravarthy
- Produced by: J. D. Chakravarthy
- Starring: J. D. Chakravarthy; Priyanka Upendra; Snehal Dabi; Sayaji Shinde
- Cinematography: Arun
- Edited by: Srinivaas
- Music by: Vidyasagar
- Production company: 24 Frames Film
- Release date: 29 March 2002
- Country: India
- Language: Hindi

Durga is a 2002 Indian Hindi-language romantic action drama film written, produced and directed by J. D. Chakravarthy who also stars in lead role, with Priyanka Upendra and Sayaji Shinde in prominent roles. The film was simultaneously shot in Telugu as Soori (2000). The film was released to negative reviews.

== Cast ==
- J. D. Chakravarthy as Durga
- Priyanka Upendra as Gayatri
- Sayaji Shinde as Bhushan Thapa
- Aanjjan Srivastav as Gayatri's father
- Snehal Dabi as Guru
- G. V. Sudhakar Naidu as Krishna Thapa
- Jayaprakash Reddy
- A. V. S. Subramanyam
- Sana
- Uttej

== Soundtrack ==
Soundtrack was composed by Vidyasagar.

- Kal Tak Top - Shaan
- Hum Aur Tum - Hariharan
- Thodi Si Shararat - Sonu Nigam, Sadhana Sargam
- Do Dil - Sadhana Sargam
- Karo Karo Salaam - KK
- Hey Oh Chamma - Sonu Nigam, Hema Sardesai
- Barah Se Class - Udit Narayan, Jaspinder Narula

== Reception ==
A critic from Rediff.com wrote that "This is one of those films that should never have been made". Taran Adarsh of Bollywood Hungama rated the film one out of five and wrote that "If the film stands out in any department, it is Chekravarthy's performance. He excels in the brilliantly executed action sequences (in the scene when the goons try to beat him in the college canteen and towards the climax, when he single-handedly takes on all the members of the rival gang). He succeeds as an actor, but does not make an impact as a director".
