= Money (1993 film) =

1993 Telugu film by Siva Nageswara Rao

- Film poster
- Directed by: Siva Nageswara Rao
- Written by: Siva Nageswara Rao
- Produced by: Ram Gopal Varma
- Starring: J. D. Chakravarthy; Chinna; Jayasudha; Renuka Shahane; Paresh Rawal; Kota Srinivasa Rao; Bramhanandam
- Cinematography: Teja
- Edited by: Shankar
- Music by: Sri
- Production company: Varma Creations
- Release date: 11 June 1993
- Running time: 131 minutes
- Country: India
- Language: Telugu
- Budget: ₹55 lakh
- Box office: ₹3 crore (distributor share)

Money is a 1993 Indian Telugu language comedy thriller film written and directed by Siva Nageswara Rao in his directorial debut. Produced by Ram Gopal Varma, the film features an ensemble cast including J. D. Chakravarthy, Chinna, Jayasudha, Renuka Shahane, Paresh Rawal, Kota Srinivasa Rao, and Brahmanandam. It also marks the first lead role for J. D. Chakravarthy.

Money faced production delays due to financial issues and an accident involving Paresh Rawal. After filming, it was shelved for six months due to a lack of funds to retrieve it from the lab. It struggled to find a distributor for several months, but eventually, Ram Gopal Varma and Suresh Productions arranged for its release. Although production began in 1990, the film was released in 1993.

Upon release, Money received positive reviews for its humour and cast performances. Brahmanandam's portrayal of Khan Dada, which became an iconic character, was particularly praised. Initially not part of the script, the character was added to extend its short runtime. Brahmanandam later listed Money among his top 11 films.

Made on a budget of ₹55 lakh, the film became a major commercial success, collecting a distributor share of over ₹3 crore. It also won three Nandi Awards, including Second Best Feature Film, Best First Film of a Director for Siva Nageswara Rao, and Best Male Comedian for Brahmanandam. The film's success led to two sequels, Money Money (1995) and Money Money, More Money (2011), and a Hindi remake titled Love Ke Liye Kuch Bhi Karega (2001).

== Plot ==
The film explores the lengths people go to for money, portraying it as equivalent to a deity on earth.

Chakri and Bose are two unemployed friends with contrasting ideologies. Bose is determined to earn money through honest means, despite his repeated failures in securing a job. Chakri, however, believes that dishonesty is the quickest path to wealth. Bose is in love with his landlord’s daughter, Renu, but refrains from proposing due to his inability to support her financially and his overdue rent. When Renu's father begins arranging her marriage, Bose finally asks for her hand but is humiliated and rejected. Pressured by Renu’s ultimatum to marry her or face her suicide, Bose is persuaded by Chakri to kidnap their wealthy neighbor, Vijaya, for ransom.

Vijaya is married to Subba Rao, who depends on her wealth after her father made her the sole heir to his fortune. Subba Rao, deeply in debt and having an extramarital affair, frequently hires hitmen to kill Vijaya, hoping to inherit her property. However, his plans fail repeatedly. When Bose and Chakri inadvertently kidnap Vijaya, Subba Rao is relieved and agrees to pay them more than their ransom demand if they kill her. Shocked by Subba Rao's response, Bose and Chakri disclose their actions to Vijaya and expose her husband’s intentions by having her listen to the ransom call.

The police investigate Vijaya's disappearance, suspecting Subba Rao of murder. Subba Rao’s lawyer argues that without a body, the charges are circumstantial, and privately advises Subba Rao to ensure the body is never found if he is indeed guilty. Meanwhile, Bose and Chakri, with Renu’s assistance, devise a plan to implicate Subba Rao. Pretending to kill Vijaya and dump her body at Golconda Fort, they lure Subba Rao into a trap.

In a subplot, Khan Dada, a small-time rowdy often misled by Chakri with promises of fame, falls victim to a conman, Manikyam, who pretends to be a film talent scout. After discovering the deception, Khan Dada kills Manikyam and flees to Golconda Fort, inadvertently complicating Bose and Chakri’s plan.

At the fort, Subba Rao, pressured by the situation and surrounded by the police, flees and hides in a car bound for Gujarat. Vijaya, now aware of Subba Rao’s murderous intent, employs Bose and Chakri in her company. The film concludes with Bose and Renu marrying and Subba Rao living in hiding at a dhaba in Gujarat, evading the police.

== Cast ==
- J. D. Chakravarthy as Chakri
- Chinna as Bose
- Jayasudha as Vijaya
- Renuka Shahane as Renu
- Paresh Rawal as Subba Rao
- Brahmanandam as Khan Dada
- Kota Srinivasa Rao
- Sharat Saxena as a police officer
- Tanikella Bharani as Manikyam
- Oru Viral Krishna Rao as Renu's father
- Uttej as Yadagiri
- Kallu Chidambaram as Defence lawyer

== Production ==
=== Development ===
During the production of Kshana Kshanam (1991), Siva Nageswara Rao, who was part of Ram Gopal Varma's direction team, was offered a permanent position by Varma with a payment of ₹5 lakh per film. However, Siva Nageswara Rao expressed his desire to direct films independently. In response, Varma suggested several story ideas, including an adaptation of the 1986 American film Ruthless People. Siva Nageswara Rao selected this storyline, which ultimately became the basis for the film Money.

=== Casting ===
For the casting, J. D. Chakravarthy, Chinna, and Jayasudha were chosen early on during the production of Kshana Kshanam. However, finding the actor for the role of Jayasudha's husband posed challenges. Initially, Dasari Narayana Rao was considered, but Siva Nageswara Rao decided against it, concerned that Dasari's stature might lead audiences to believe he had directed the film. The team then approached S. P. Balasubrahmanyam, who agreed to take on the role. However, Ram Gopal Varma raised concerns that Balasubrahmanyam might have misunderstood and assumed Varma was directing the film. Upon confirming this misunderstanding, they decided to cast someone else. Finally, Siva Nageswara Rao chose Paresh Rawal, impressed by his performance in Kshana Kshanam.

For the role of the young female lead, Boney Kapoor, who was working with Ram Gopal Varma on Raatri (1992), recommended Renuka Shahane after seeing her in the television program Surabhi. Following Kapoor’s suggestion, Siva Nageswara Rao watched the show and approached Shahane, who promptly agreed to join the project. She arrived four days before the shoot and thoroughly prepared for her role, translating her dialogues into Hindi for practice.

=== Filming ===
After completing Kshana Kshanam, Ram Gopal Varma began simultaneous production on Raatri and Money. However, Money encountered delays when Paresh Rawal suffered an accident, pausing production for three months. During the interim, Varma completed Raatri and Antham, but both films underperformed at the box office, creating financial challenges for Money. To overcome these difficulties, Varma secured funding through his contacts, allowing the team to resume and complete the film. The initial cut was only 9,000 feet, prompting Siva Nageswara Rao to add new content to extend the runtime. This led to the inclusion of the character Khan Dada, played by Brahmanandam, with his scenes shot in just three days. Despite these additions, the film's runtime remained at 2 hours and 10 minutes.

The song "Bhadram, Be Careful" was originally planned as a duet between characters played by Chakravarthy and Chinna, and the scene was shot accordingly. However, it was later restructured to feature Paresh Rawal, Uttej, and others.

Uttej worked as an associate director for the film and also appeared in a small role. Shyam K. Naidu and Sameer Reddy served as assistant cameramen under the supervision of Teja. Both Shyam K. Naidu and Sameer Reddy later became notable cinematographers, while Teja went on to establish himself as a prominent director.

== Music ==
Money

Soundtrack album by Sri
- Released: 10 June 1993
- Recorded: 1993
- Genre: Feature film soundtrack
- Length: 27:57
- Label: Lahari Music

The music for Money was composed by Sri (variously credited as Sri, Sri Murthy and Srinivasa Murthy), with lyrics written by Sirivennela Seetharama Sastry. The track "Anaganaganaga" was not included in the film.

Initially, M. M. Keeravani was approached to compose the music for Money, following his successful collaboration with Ram Gopal Varma on Kshana Kshanam. Keeravani had agreed to compose for both Raatri and Money and had already composed two songs for Money. However, after completing Raatri, Keeravani expressed discomfort with working on a horror film, as it disturbed his sleep, leading to his exit from the project. In search of an alternative, Siva Nageswara Rao approached Sri, a conductor for top music directors, who agreed to compose the music for the film.

While the soundtrack credits Keeravani for composing "Chakravarthiki Veedhi" and "Lechinde Lediki Parugu," director Siva Nageswara Rao mentioned that Keeravani composed "Chakravarthiki Veedhi" and "Bhadram, Be Careful" for the film.

All lyrics are written by Sirivennela Seetharama Sastry.

Track list
No.	Title	Music	Singer(s)	Length
1.	"Chakravarthiki Veedhi"	M. M. Keeravani	S. P. Balasubrahmanyam	4:34
2.	"Lechinde Lediki Parugu"	M. M. Keeravani	S. P. Balasubrahmanyam , J. D. Chakravarthy, K. S. Chithra	3:54
3.	"Anaganaganaga"	Sri	Sri, J. D. Chakravarthy, K. S. Chithra, Jayasudha, Chinna murthy	4:36
4.	"Vareva Emi Face"	Sri	Sri, Ram Gopal Varma,Sirivennela Seetharama Sastry, Satyam	4:59
5.	"Paadu Kaburu"	Sri	Mano, J. D. Chakravarthy, K. S. Chithra	5:59
6.	"Bhadram Be Careful"	Sri	Sri, J. D. Chakravarthy	3:14
Total length:				28:05

== Distribution ==
Even after completion, the production faced further setbacks due to a lack of funds to retrieve the film from the laboratory, leaving it shelved for six months. The film faced difficulties in securing a distribution deal, despite being screened for fifty days at Annapurna Studios' preview theatre to attract potential buyers and industry figures. However, there was limited interest from distributors. Ram Gopal Varma ultimately arranged funding to release the film in some regions, while Suresh Productions handled its release in others. Though production began in 1990, the film was released in 1993.

== Reception ==
Money was made on a budget of ₹55 lakh and became a commercial success, collecting a distributor share of over ₹3 crore. The film completed a 100-day run in eight centres and ran for 130 days at Odeon Theatre in Hyderabad.

== Awards ==
Nandi Awards - 1993

- Second Best Feature Film - Silver - Ram Gopal Varma
- Best First Film of a Director - Siva Nageswara Rao
- Best Male Comedian - Brahmanandam
