= Bombay Priyudu =

1996 film K. Raghavendra Rao

- DVD cover
- Directed by: K. Raghavendra Rao
- Written by: Satyanand
- Produced by: K. Krishna Mohana Rao
- Starring: J. D. Chakravarthy; Rambha; Vanisri; Sudhakar; Brahmanandam; Tanikella Bharani; Chitti Babu Punyamurthula
- Cinematography: Chota K. Naidu
- Edited by: Marthand K. Venkatesh
- Music by: M. M. Keeravani
- Production company: RK Film Associates
- Release date: 5 September 1996
- Country: India
- Language: Telugu

Bombay Priyudu (transl. Lover from Bombay) is a 1996 Indian Telugu-language romantic comedy drama film directed by K. Raghavendra Rao. The film stars J. D. Chakravarthy and Rambha, with music composed by M. M. Keeravani. The film was a commercial success, particularly noted for its soundtrack, which became highly popular.

== Plot ==
Chitti Babu and Pyarelal are roommates in Bombay. Chitti Babu is a professional photographer who forever prowls the streets with his camera. One day when he comes to the airport to take pictures of a man, he spots Raga Sudha and falls in love with her. Bombay, who steals a gold chain from a jeweller's, drops it in Sudha's bag while being chased by the police. The bag goes to Chitti Babu's gypsy, who finds his dream girl's photograph in it.

Chitti Babu dons the guise of a rich man and makes her come to different places to collect her bag, but does not give it. Chitti Babu meets her and tells her that he will help her in getting her bag. She falls for Chitti Babu. Later, she finds that the bag is with Chitti Babu and accuses him of cheating her. In the process of appeasing his lady love, Chitti Babu meets with an accident and ends up in a hospital. This rekindles Sudha's love for him.

Sudha's mother, Dhana Lakshmi returns from abroad with a prospective groom for her daughter. Coming to know of her daughter's love affair, she takes her away to Hyderabad and sets up a date for her wedding because Dhana Lakshmi's love is an anathema. Chitti Babu saves Dhana Lakshmi from goons sent by her manager. He is introduced himself as J. D. to Dhana Lakshmi. She hires him as Sudha's bodyguard. The manager kidnaps Sudha while they are going to Srisailam for marriage by bus. Sudha's maternal uncle Buchiki reveals that J. D. is none other than Chitti Babu. The manager wants to marry Sudha and tries to rape her in the running bus. Chitti Babu fights Benarjee and marries Sudha with the blessings of Dhana Lakshmi.

== Cast ==
- J. D. Chakravarthy as Chitti Babu / J. D.
- Rambha as Raga Sudha
- Vanisri as Dhana Lakshmi
- M. Balaiah as Dhana Lakshmi's father
- Sudhakar as Pyarelal
- Brahmanandam as Bombay
- Tanikella Bharani as Kaima Patel
- A.V.S. as Buchiki
- Babu Mohan as P. K. Rao
- Sivaji Raja as P. K. Rao's son
- Chitti Babu Punyamurthula as singer
- Gundu Hanumantha Rao as Pandu
- Banerjee as Dhana Lakshmi's manager
- Indu Anand

== Soundtrack ==
All music is composed by M. M. Keeravaani.

No.	Title	Lyrics	Singer(s)	Length
1.	"Rajkapooru Cinemaloni"	Chandrabose	M. M. Keeravaani, K. S. Chithra	5:12
2.	"Emhayigundiro"	Veturi	S. P. Balasubrahmanyam, M. M. Srilekha	4:57
3.	"Balamuralikrishna"	Chandrabose	S. P. Balasubrahmanyam, K. S. Chithra, M. M. Keeravaani	5:41
4.	"Chethilona Cheyyesi"	Veturi	S. P. Balasubrahmanyam, Prathima Rao	5:09
5.	"Chandana Cheeranu"	Chandrabose	S. P. Balasubrahmanyam, Anuradha Sriram	4:57
6.	"Aho Priya"	Sirivennela Seetharama Sastry	S. P. Balasubrahmanyam, K. S. Chithra	4:29
7.	"Guppedu Gundenu"	Chandrabose	S. P. Balasubrahmanyam, K. S. Chithra	6:08
8.	"Pranayama"	Chandrabose	M. M. Keeravaani, K. S. Chithra	5:01
Total length:				41:34

== Reception ==
A critic from Andhra Today wrote, "After a superhit like 'Pellisandadi' such a dull movie as this is not to the director's credit".

== Awards ==
- Nandi Award for Best Female Playback Singer - K. S. Chitra - "Pranayama"
