= Sri (composer) =

Background information
- Born: Srinivasa Chakravarthi Kommineni; 13 September 1966
- Origin: Guntur district, Andhra Pradesh, India
- Died: 18 April 2015 (aged 48) Hyderabad, India
- Genre: Trendy
- Occupations: Film composer, music director
- Instruments: Vocals, guitar, keyboard
- Years active: 1992–2015

Sri (born Kommineni Srinivasa Chakravarthi, 13 September 1966 – 18 April 2015) was an Indian film composer, playback singer, and television presenter, known for his works in Telugu cinema. He was the son of veteran Music composer K. Chakravarthy. He was the lead anchor for the 1995 show Anthakshari aired on Gemini TV.

He lend his vocals for "Jagamanta Kutumbam Naadi" from the movie Chakram released in 2005. He is best known for his compositions in hits for films, such as Money Money, Lucky Chance, Little Soldiers, Sindhooram, Anaganaga Oka Roju, Aavida Maa Aavide, Gaayam and Ammoru.

== Education ==
He did his BE in industrial engineering from Manipal University.

== Death ==
He died due to a kidney related ailment on 18 April 2015, in Hyderabad, India.

== Filmography ==
- Police Brothers (1992)
- Money (1993)
- Gaayam (1993)
- Kurradhi Kurradu (1994)
- Money Money (1995)
- Ammoru (1995)
- Little Soldiers (1996)
- Anaganaga Oka Roju (1996)
- Sindhooram (1997)
- Aavida Maa Aavide (1998)
- Naa Hrudayamlo Nidurinche Cheli (1999)
- Neeke Manasichaanu (2003)
- Kaasi (2004)
- Chanti (2004)
- Sahasam (2013)
- Aadu Magaadra Bujji (2014)
- Amrutham Chandamamalo (2014)

=== Dubbing artist ===
Year	Title	Actor
2002	Anandam	Akash
2003	Okariki Okaru	Sriram
2004	143	Sairam Shankar

== Private albums ==
- Hai Rabba – Starring Smitha
