= Dahini: The Witch =

Dahini - The Witch
- Directed by: Rajesh Touchriver
- Written by: Ravi Punnam (dialogue)
- Screenplay by: Rajesh Touchriver
- Story by: Rajesh Touchriver
- Produced by: Sunitha Krishnan; Pradeep Narayanan
- Starring: Tannishtha Chatterjee; J. D. Chakravarthy; Sruthy Jayan
- Cinematography: Noushad Shereef
- Edited by: K. Sasi Kumar
- Music by: George Joseph
- Production company: Orion Pictures International
- Release dates: November 2022 (Australia, Sweden)
- Country: India
- Languages: Hindi; Odia

Dahini - The Witch is a 2022 Indian Hindi language supernatural thriller film written, and directed by Rajesh Touchriver; produced by Sunitha Krishnan, and Pradeep Narayanan. The film stars Tannishtha Chatterjee, J. D. Chakravarthy, and Sruthy Jayan in pivotal roles.

The film received widespread praise after its release and won several international awards, including Best Feature Film at the Titan International Film Festival and Best International Feature Film at the Pacific Beach International Festival also was nominated at the Swedish International Film Festival.

== Plot ==
The plot exploits witch hunting tradition in eastern India.

== Cast ==
- Tannishtha Chatterjee as Kamala
- J. D. Chakravarthy as Pratap
- Sruthy Jayan as Pallavi
- Badrul Islam as Chuniya
- Mohd Ashique Hussain as Ojha
- Angana Roy as Uma
- Riju Bajaj
