= Aavida Maa Aavide =

1998 film by E. V. V. Satyanarayana

- Theatrical release poster
- Directed by: E. V. V. Satyanarayana
- Written by: Marudhuri Raja; Esukapalli Mohan Rao (dialogues)
- Screenplay by: E. V. V. Satyanarayana
- Produced by: D. Kishore; Murali Mohan (presents)
- Starring: Nagarjuna; Tabu; Heera Rajagopal
- Cinematography: Ajayan Vincent
- Edited by: K. Ravindra Babu
- Music by: Sri
- Production company: Jayabheri Art Productions
- Release date: 14 January 1998
- Running time: 153 minutes
- Country: India
- Language: Telugu

Aavida Maa Aavide (English: She too is my wife) is a 1998 Telugu comedy drama film written and directed by E. V. V. Satyanarayana and produced by D. Kishore under the Jayabheri Art Productions banner. The film stars Nagarjuna, Tabu and Heera in the lead roles, with music composed by Sri.

It is inspired by the 1940 American film My Favorite Wife, which itself is based on Alfred, Lord Tennyson's 1864 poem Enoch Arden. The film had an average box office run despite a large opening. It was dubbed into Tamil as Police Killadi and Hindi as Biwi No.2.

== Plot ==
In Hyderabad, Circle Inspector (CI) Vikranth is pressured by his father, to get married. During a police encounter, he meets another police inspector, S. I. Archana and due to circumstances both keep bumping into each other. Eventually they fall in love, get married and have a son. Sometime later, while transferring a criminal to court their jeep gets blasted and everyone in jeep die along with Archana and their son. Vikranth in unable to forget Archana and his son in spite of support from his father and Archana's mother to forget her (as she has died) and move on with his life.

One day they arrange his marriage with a young lady, Jhansi and hide about Vikranth's first marriage. They tell Vikranth that she has accepted marriage on her behalf even after learning about his past and get married. After a while, Archana and their son come back into Vikranth's life. Vikranth learns that she did not die and terrorists had kidnapped her, their son and their men before the jeep blasted. Meanwhile, Jhansi wants to shift to a new flat in the same locality where Archana also resides. Eventually, Archana and Jhansi become neighbours as Vikranth fails to convince Jhansi not to move to the flat. Both women think that their husbands are look-alikes and that they are not married to one person. Vikranth does a double duty of managing both his wives so that they don't suspect him. Jhansi's cousin Kirloskar is a criminal who was once arrested by Archana and put behind bars. There he befriends another criminal, Murari who goes to jail due to Jhansi because of his multiple marriages and betrayal. These two keep interfering into Jhansi and Vikranth's life and try to expose the truth about Vikranth's first marriage. But they fail everytime. After many failed attempts, at last they expose Vikranth's betrayal to his respective wives. They get angry and think he has cheated on them and send divorce papers. Vikranth says that he loved Archana wholeheartedly while he was devastated by the deaths of his wife and son. His father had advised him to move on because he was living a solo life and he did not want him to live like his father after his mother's death when he was a child. Therefore, to respect his father and mother-in-law's wishes, he remarries Jhansi but he didn't know that Jhansi was unaware about his marriage to Archana. He says that he wanted to tell the truth to Jhansi but her father stopped him because Jhansi did not want to get married as she was a tomboy. He tells him to reveal the truth gradually to ease the matter. Archana and Jhansi say that they know about Vikranth's true nature and they want to divorce him because they cannot accept the each other. Finally, Vikranth admits he can accept only Archana as his wife, whereas Jhansi walks out with her father.

== Cast ==
- Nagarjuna as C. I. Vikranth
- Tabu as S. I. Archana
- Heera Rajagopal as Jhansi
- Kota Srinivasa Rao as Murari
- Srihari as Kirloskar
- Brahmanandam as Head Constable Ramakoti
- Mallikarjuna Rao
- AVS as Hotel Owner
- Giri Babu as Vikranth's father
- Chakravarthy as Jhansi's father
- Rama Prabha as Archana's mother
- Visweswara Rao
- Gadiraju Subba Rao
- Ironleg Sastri
- Shanoor Sana as Head Constable Victoria
- Anuradha

== Soundtrack ==
Aavida Maa Aavide

Film score by Sri
- Released: 1998
- Genre: Soundtrack
- Length: 29:35
- Label: Aditya Music
- Producer: Sri

Sri chronology
Anaganaga Oka Roju (1997)	Aavida Maa Aavide (1998)	Naa Hrudayam Lo Nidurinche Cheli (1998)

Music composed by Sri. Lyrics written by Sirivennela Sitarama Sastry. Music released on ADITYA Music Company.

No.	Title	Singer(s)	Length
1.	"Chummade Chummade"	Rajesh, Poornima	4:59
2.	"Hey Vastava Chhostava"	Sri, Anuradha Sriram	4:15
3.	"Intkedadham Padavamo Antha"	SP Balu, K. S. Chithra, Swarnalatha	4:58
4.	"Om Namami"	K. S. Chithra, Hariharan	5:11
5.	"Thathaha Thathaha"	SP Balu, Sujatha	4:45
6.	"Two in One"	SP Balu, Sujatha, Anuradha Sriram	5:13
Total length:			29:35

== Reception ==
The film was reviewed by Zamin Ryot. A critic from Andhra Today wrote that "With hardly any story to carry it, the film rides on the sheer talents of the director and the acting skills of the lead man Nagarjuna. It is their show all along".
