= Ninnu Kalisaka =

- Movie Poster
- Directed by: Siva Nageswara Rao
- Screenplay by: Siva Nageswara Rao
- Story by: Jai Kiran
- Produced by: Ramoji Rao
- Starring: Santosh Samrat; Chaitanya Krishna; Dipa Shah; Piaa Bajpai
- Cinematography: BL Sanjay
- Edited by: Gautham Raju
- Music by: Sunil Kashyap
- Production company: Ushakiran Movies
- Release date: 2 October 2009
- Country: India
- Language: Telugu

Ninnu Kalisaka (transl. After Meeting You) is a 2009 Indian Telugu-language romance film produced by Ramoji Rao on Ushakiran Movies banner and directed by Siva Nageswara Rao. It stars Santosh Samrat, Chaitanya Krishna, Dipa Shah, Piaa Bajpai, and the music is composed by Sunil Kashyap.

== Plot ==
The film is a tale of two young pairs of lovers, Abhiram & Deepti and Chandu & Bindu. Abhiram & Bindu are IT professionals who moved to the USA, where they joined the same project and became good friends. Chandu & Deepti are dance professionals in India, and both want to win a dance trophy. The two pairs come closer and become good friends. After a few incidents, Abhiram & Bindu start feeling something more than friendship, and confusion arises about whether it is love. Back in India, Chandu & Deepti win the trophy, and everyone asks them whether they are in love; then they say "Yes" but not with each other, and they parts ways. The time comes for wrapping the project, and Abhiram decides to convey his feelings while Bindu waits for it. On their return, Abhiram meets a film star Jagapati Babu in the aircraft, narrates his story, and asks him for a solution. Then, he says, "First Love is always the best love", which makes him realize it is just infatuation with Bindu. Finally, Abhiram decides not to propose to Bindu & they meet their lovers at the airport and decide to marry them.

== Cast ==
- Santosh Samrat as Abhiram
- Chaitanya Krishna as Chandu
- Dipa Shah as Deepti
- Pia Bajpai as Bindu
- Siva Nageswara Rao as Prem Baba
- Krishnudu as Chanti
- M. S. Narayana as Kali
- Sudeepa Pinky as Kommali
- Jogi Naidu
- Allari Subhashini as Mandodari
- Master Bharath as Joo Joo
- Siri Vennela as Sirisha
- Vinay Varma
- Harinath Reddy Master
- Jagapati Babu as himself (Cameo appearance)
- Tarun Master as himself (Cameo appearance)

== Production ==
The film marked the Telugu film debut of Santosh Samrat, Chaitanya Krishna, Dipa Shah and Pia Bajpai. Siva Nageswara Rao also acted in the film.

== Soundtrack ==
Ninnu Kalisaka

Film score by Sunil Kashyap
- Released: 2009
- Genre: Soundtrack
- Length: 21:57
- Label: Mayuri Audio
- Producer: Sunil Kashyap

Sunil Kashyap chronology
Gita (2008)	Ninnu Kalisaka (2009)	Sneha Geetham (2009)

The music was composed by Sunil Kashyap and released by the Mayuri Audio Company. The audio release function took place at Ramoji Film City on 10 September 2009 with M. M. Keeravani, Chandrabose, S. S. Rajamouli, Rama Rajamouli, V. N. Aditya, Y. V. S. Chowdary, Vishnu Manchu, Krish Jagarlamudi, and Manchu Manoj as the chief guests.

No.	Title	Lyrics	Singer(s)	Length
1.	"Ninnativaraku"	Lakshmibhupal	Achu Rajamani, Sai Shivani	3:28
2.	"Mounam Manasullona"	Lakshmibhupal	S. P. Balasubrahmanyam, Gayatri	3:59
3.	"Andamaina Andama"	Ananta Sriram	Hariharan, Sujatha	4:12
4.	"Mabbe Nelapaiki"	Vanamali	Sunil Kashyap, Pranavi	3:12
5.	"I Love U Love U"	Lakshmibhupal	Tippu, Pranavi	3:23
6.	"Dilse Dilse"	Ananta Sriram	Sunil Kashyap, Pranavi	3:43
Total length:				21:57

== Reception ==
Jeevi of Idlebrain.com rated the film 2 out of 5 and wrote, "On a whole, Ninnu Kalisaka disappoints". He felt that it was a good story with a bad execution.
