= Ugravathara =

2024 Indian Kannada-language action film

- Directed by: Guru Murthy
- Written by: Guru Murthy
- Produced by: SG Sathish
- Starring: Priyanka Upendra; Suman; Ajay
- Cinematography: Veena Nandakumar
- Edited by: Venky UDV
- Music by: Radha Krishna Basrur
- Production company: SGS Creations
- Distributed by: Casablanca Film Factory
- Release date: November 1, 2024 (India)
- Country: India
- Language: Kannada

Ugravathara is a 2024 Indian Kannada-language action thriller film written and directed by Trivikram Raghu.

== Premise ==
Teekshana is a brilliant detective who is well known for solving the toughest of cases using her unique techniques, methods and different strategies.

== Cast ==
- Priyanka Upendra
- Suman
- Ajay
- Pavitra Lokesh
- Natraj Peri
- Cockroach Sudhi
- Sai Dheena
- Laksha Shetty
- Roopa Rayappa

== Release ==
Detective Teekshana was released on 1 November 2024. Casablanca Film Factory handled the digital distribution, with the film beginning to stream on Amazon Prime Video from 3 October 2026.

== Reception ==
A critic from Times of India said that "An Action Saga Which Keeps People Engaged" and gave 3/5 stars. A Sharadhaa of The New Indian Express gave 2.5/5 stars and wrote "Priyanka Upendra shoulders this action-packed crime drama".
