= Money Money, More Money =

2011 Telugu Indian film

- Directed by: J. D. Chakravarthy
- Written by: J. D. Chakravarthy
- Based on: Darwaaza Bandh Rakho (2006)
- Produced by: K. Satyanarayana
- Starring: Brahmanandam; J. D. Chakravarthy; Brahmaji
- Music by: Chakri (composer)
- Production companies: Chekravarthy Productions; First Choice Media House
- Distributed by: Reliance Entertainment
- Release date: 26 August 2011
- Running time: 111 minutes
- Country: India
- Language: Telugu

Money Money, More Money is a 2011 Indian Telugu film written and directed by J. D. Chakravarthy. The film features J. D. Chakravarthy, Brahmanandam, and Brahmaji in prominent roles.

The film is a remake of the 2006 Hindi film Darwaaza Bandh Rakho, also directed by J. D. Chakravarthy. It is presented as a sequel to the 1993 film Money and its 1995 follow-up Money Money. However, it is considered more of a standalone film, with only a few scenes featuring Brahmanandam and Chakravarthy that establish a connection to the previous Money films.

== Plot ==
Four small-time crooks, Chakri (J. D. Chakravarthy), Raghu (Brahmaji), Abbas (Mukul Dev) and Gogineni Gangaraju aka Goga (Kavin Dave) turn towards kidnapping for some quick money. They kidnap Megahana (Tara Alisha), daughter of a millionaire Jagadish (Nagababu) and they demand money (1 crore). They are forced to barge into the home of a vegetarian family of 35. The head of the household is Khan Dada (Bramhanandam), an ex-don and rival of Chakri.

Their stay in the house gets extended when they learn than Jagadish has gone abroad and they have to wait until he returns. The kidnappers are forced to take more hostages to keep their identity secret and prevent the kidnapping venture from failing. Eventually other people are stuck in the house, such as: Sankarabharanam (Venu Madhav), a pizza guy, Bullabbai (Rajeev Kanakala), a police constable, Trisha (Gajala), a sales girl, Tirumala Shetty (guy who wants money from Khan Dada), etc.

Jagadish finally appears he gives the four kidnappers the money, however there is now a fight between the four, and then Jagadish calls the police. The kidnappers go to Police station, Jagadish and Meghana say Chakri, Goga and Raghu are innocent but not Abbas. After 16 months Chakri owns a hotel and works with Shankarabharanam. Meghana and Chakri are both friends, Trisha works with Raghu on the sales business, Goga owns a sweet shop, Bullabbai is not a constable but a S.I., Abbas goes to jail, and the Khan residence live happily ever after and Khan and Chakri become good friends.

== Cast ==
- J. D. Chakravarthy as Chakri
- Bramhaji as Raghu
- Kevin Dave as Gogineni Gangaraju aka Goga
- Mukul Dev as Abbas
- Bramhanandam as Khan Dada
- Tara Alisha Berry as Meghana
- Gajala as Trisha
- Naga Babu as Jagadish
- Chandramohan as Jagan Pataudi
- Subbaraju as Azharuddin
- Senthil as Dr. Sabhapathi
- Asha Saini as Champa
- Rekha as Geetha Madhuri
- Ramaprabha as Grand Mother
- Geetika as Sweety
- Allari Subhashini as Servant
- Jeeva as Tirumala Shetty
- Venu Madhav as Sankarabharanam
- Rajeev Kanakala as Bullabbai
- Ramjagan as Dattatreya
- Duvvasi Mohan as Munuswamy
- Taarzan as Pizza Shop Owner
- Surya as Babloo Khan
- Narasimha as Sunil Shetty
- Gundu Sudarshan as Sampangi
- Shashank as Police Officer
- Jackie as P.T.Paul
- Jhansi as Jayaprada
- Chalapathi Rao

== Reception ==
Radhika Rajamani of Rediff rated the film one out of five stars and wrote, "There are just a few scenes with Brahmanandam and Chekri that establish the link with the earlier Money. This caper is pretty childish and immature with the humour falling flat and the actors, including Brahmanandam, not able to rise above the weak script and portrayal of characters."
