= Roommates (2006 Indian film) =

Indian Film

- Poster
- Directed by: AVS
- Written by: Y. S. Krishneswara Rao (dialogues)
- Screenplay by: AVS
- Story by: AVS
- Produced by: C. C. Reddy
- Starring: Allari Naresh; Baladitya; Srinivasa Reddy; Suman Setty; Navaneet Kaur
- Cinematography: V. Srinivasa Reddy
- Edited by: Marthand K. Venkatesh
- Music by: Mani Sharma
- Production company: Visu Films Pvt. Ltd
- Release date: August 11, 2006
- Country: India
- Language: Telugu

Roommates is a 2006 Indian Telugu-language comedy suspense thriller film directed by AVS and starring Allari Naresh, Baladitya, Srinivasa Reddy, Suman Setty and Navaneet Kaur.

== Plot ==
The film begins with four friends Ramakrishna, Shekar, Seshu, and Bunty. They are going to commit suicide which was stopped by Pallavi and ask for their reason to end their lives. The four friends are childhood besties who care for each other. They had been cheated by a Dubai broker called Dixitulu by taking hefty amounts from them and finally escapes with the whole money by believing him they came to Hyderabad and understood that they have been cheated unable to face their families then decided to commit suicide.

Then Pallavi inspires to live with dignity on their own hands and arranges a shelter in to a strict and punctual house owner Viswanath who inspires by saying he was also cheated like them, but he stands with his own and settled in life who later reveals that he was also cheated by Dixitulu. Later, being an MBA graduate, Ramakrishna manages to get a management job at an IT company with the support of Pallavi and decides to take care of remaining friends. Meanwhile, Pallavi, being an orphan, bonds friendship with the innocent quartet.

One day, the quartet watched Dixitulu in a market became angry and chased him to take down. He escaped from them with a short edge. Then, after knowing the facts, Pallavi makes them realize their mistake and focus on their talents. This makes Ramakrishna impressed on Pallavi's attitude and starts liking her. Slowly, they focus on musical talent and start a band called "Roommates: The Power of Five Fingers," including Pallavi, as their manager of the band. Then, gaining recognition through their circles later, all facts were known to their parents and consoles them by saying all things were done for good. Meanwhile, Ramakrishna and Pallavi started liking each other and expressed their feelings with each other.

One morning at their home premises, the quartet found the dead body of Dixitulu. Then cops arrest them for the inquiry later, Bhargava, an IPS officer who appears to be crazy appointed by his boss Sarath Chandra. In the investigation, he believes that the quartet are innocent and gives a chance to escape from jail. Being tortured by the cops to accept the murder they decided to accept his offer and escapes from jail.

Later the tension arouse Pallavi announces the roommate's new concert is going to happen in the Lalita Kala Thoranam and invites the state Home Minister (Nagendra Babu) and singer S. P. Balasubrahmanyam as chief guests. All cops were ready to arrest them after the successful concert but suddenly arrests Bhargava by the orders of Sarath Chandra then Ramakrishna reveals the facts to everyone I.e. Bhargava was the actual killer of Dixitulu who became mentally ill later turned into a psychopath. After given hints by Ramakrishna Sarath Chandra investigates the case finds out the actual killer actually it is a trap set by them to catch him, they already proved themselves as innocent.

== Cast ==
- Allari Naresh as Ramakrishna
- Baladitya as Shekhar
- Srinivasa Reddy as Seshu
- Suman Setty as Bunty
- Navaneet Kaur as Pallavi
- Jeeva as Landlord
- Raghu Babu as Basaveswara
- Naresh as Sarat Chandra
- Nagendra Babu as Home Minister
- Nassar as Bhargava
- Subbaraya Sharma as High Court Judge
- Ali
- L. B. Sriram
- Dixit as Dixitulu
- Narsing Yadav
- Gundu Hanumantha Rao
- Prudhvi Raj
- Sana
- Hema
- Annapoorna
- AVS
- Junior Relangi
- S. P. Balasubrahmanyam as himself (cameo appearance)

== Production ==
Rajiv Kanakala, Sameer, Siva Reddy and Pranathi were first cast in the lead roles but were later replaced by Allari Naresh, Baladitya and Navaneet Kaur.

== Soundtrack ==
Music by Mani Sharma in his 100th film.

Track listing
No.	Title	Lyrics	Singer(s)	Length
1.	"Hayire"	Sudahala Ashokteja	S. P. Charan, Sai Sankerthi	4:36
2.	"Yamuni"	Maha Kavi Srisri	Mallikarjun	1:23
3.	"Magic of Music (Swara Prastanam-1)"	—	—	1:37
4.	"Magic of Music (Swara Prastanam-2)"	—	—	1:57
5.	"Slokam"	—	Sunitha	2:39
6.	"Hayire"	Sudala Ashokteja	Mallikarjun, Sai Sankeethi	4:36
7.	"Aveasham"	Ananth Sriram	S. P. Charan, Mallikarjun, Rahul, Hemachandra	4:41
Total length:				21:29
