= Priyanka Upendra =

Indian actress

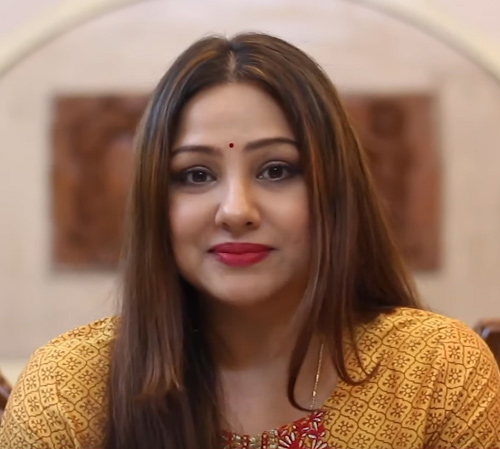
- Priyanka in 2019
- Born: Priyanka Trivedi; 12 November 1977 (age 48); Kolkata, West Bengal, India
- Occupations: Actress, Film producer
- Years active: 1997–present
- Spouse: Upendra (m. 2003)
- Children: 2

Priyanka Upendra (née Trivedi) is an Indian actress who predominantly appears in Kannada films and in a few Tamil and Bengali language films.

== Early life ==
Priyanka was born in Calcutta (now Kolkata). Her mother is from West Bengal and father from Uttar Pradesh. She spent ten years of her schooling life in the US and about three years in Singapore, before graduating with a commerce degree from a college in Kolkata. She described herself as "little introverted, pretty flexible as a person, a good listener and overtly sensitive." She appeared in television commercials for brands such as Britannia, Orient Electric and Pillsbury in the late 1990s. During this time, she was cast by director Basu Chatterjee in his first Bengali film, Hothat Brishti (1998). She went on to make two more films with him, Chupi Chupi (2001) and Tak Jhal Mishti (2002).

== Career ==
=== Beginnings ===
Priyanka made her silver screen debut in Prabhat Roy's Bengali film Yoddha (1997). She subsequently moved to Mumbai and acted in the Hindi film Mujhe Meri Biwi Se Bachaao (2001). In 2002, she acted in the Bengali film Saathi, which became one of the highest-grossers of Bengali cinema. She then began to act in South Indian films such as Soori, Raa, Durga, H2O, Kotigobba, Raajjiyam, Raja, Kadhal Sadugudu and Jananam.

=== 2015–present ===
In 2015, she starred in Priyanka, a film based on a real-life incident involving a murder where a 27-year-old man killed another man whose wife he was in love with. Released in 2016, the film was received well by critics and her performance received praise. S. Viswanath of Deccan Herald felt that Priyanka turned in "with a polished show as the doting, Facebook-addicted wife." In her second release of the year, the horror film Mummy, Priyanka played a widow and a mother to a young girl and pregnant with a second child, who move in to a haunted villa. Her performance was received well by critics. A. Sharadhaa of The New Indian Express called the film "technically brilliant" and that "Priyanka carries the film on her shoulders with ease..." In 2nd Half, her only release of 2018, she played Anuradha, a police constable, who takes it upon herself to solve a case after receiving no support from her superiors. Critic Sharadhaa felt, "Priyanka carries a lot of responsibility on her shoulders. Being the central focus of the film, she has ample scope to perform and does justice to her role." In H. Lohith's crime-thriller Devaki (2019), who also directed Mummy, Priyanka played a mother who frantically searches the streets of Kolkata for her kidnapped daughter (played by real-life daughter, Aishwarya) with the help of a police officer. Vivek M. V. of Deccan Herald wrote of her performance, "Priyanka is earnest but for the most part, she is in tears. We wonder if she could have brought out other facets like anxiety, fear and the pain of a single mother separated from her daughter. Thankfully, she makes it up in the final scene."

In her first release after Devaki, a period film 1980, set in the same year as the title, Priyanka played a novelist. The film explored the concept of an alternate universe. It was released on the OTT platform Namma Flix on 15 October 2021. Critic Prathibha Joy wrote for Ottplay.com that the film lacked "execution" despite having an "intriguing narrative" and "[the makers'] best efforts, most notably by lead actress Priyanka Upendra..."

== Personal life ==
On 14 December 2003, she married Upendra, who first starred opposite her in 2001 in the Telugu movie Raa and then in H_{2}O.

== Filmography ==
| Year | Title | Role(s) | Language(s) | Notes | Ref(s) |
|---|---|---|---|---|---|
| 1997 | Yoddha | – | Bengali | | |
| 1998 | Hothat Brishti | Dipa | Bengali | | |
| 1998 | Rakter Doshe | — | Bengali | | |
| 1998 | Bada Din | — | Hindi | | |
| 1999 | Sautela | — | Hindi | | |
| 1999 | Katha Kahiba Mo Matha Sindura | Pinky | Odia | | |
| 2001 | Mujhe Meri Biwi Se Bachaao | Sonia Malkani | Hindi | | |
| 2001 | Chupi Chupi | Dipa | Bengali | | |
| 2001 | Soori | Gayatri | Telugu | | |
| 2001 | Raa | Shanthi | Telugu | | |
| 2001 | Kotigobba | Priya | Kannada | | |
| 2002 | H2O | Kaveri | Kannada | credited as Priyanka Upendra | |
| 2002 | Durga | Gayatri | Hindi | | |
| 2002 | Raajjiyam | Anuradha | Tamil | | |
| 2002 | Sathi | Sonali | Bengali | | |
| 2002 | Raja | Priya | Tamil | | |
| 2002 | Tak Jhal Mishti | Dipantika | Bengali | | |
| 2002 | Guru Mahaguru | — | Hindi | | |
| 2003 | Kadhal Sadugudu | Kausalya | Tamil | | |
| 2003 | Ice | Anjali | Tamil | | |
| 2003 | Sangee | Rupa | Bengali | | |
| 2004 | Rowdy Aliya | Rani | Kannada | | |
| 2004 | Malla | Priya | Kannada | | |
| 2004 | Jananam | Shruthi | Tamil | | |
| 2006 | Agni Pariksha | Kabita | Bengali | | |
| 2008 | Aamar Pratigya | Rina Sen | Bengali | | |
| 2008 | Golmaal | Chandni | Bengali | | |
| 2009 | Aparadhi | Nandini | Bengali | | |
| 2010 | Pancharangi | Herself | Kannada | | |
| 2011 | Shrimathi | Priya | Kannada | | |
| 2011 | Hello Memsaheb | Mita | Bengali | | |
| 2013 | Enemmy | Eklavya's Wife | Hindi | | |
| 2014 | Crazy Star | Ravi's Wife | Kannada | | |
| 2015 | Uppi 2 | Herself | Kannada | Also producer | |
| 2016 | Priyanka | Priyanka | Kannada | | |
| 2016 | Mummy | Priya | Kannada | | |
| 2018 | 2nd Half | Anuradha | Kannada | | |
| 2019 | Devaki | Devaki | Kannada | | |
| 2021 | 1980 | Priya | Kannada | Direct OTT Release – Namma Flix | |
| 2023 | Master Anshuman | Madhabi Sen | Bengali | | |
| 2024 | Gowri | — | Kannada | Special appearance | |
| 2024 | Ugravathara | Durga | Kannada | Lead role | |
| 2025 | Kamaro2 | Sara | Kannada | | |
| 2026 | September 21 | Kamala | Hindi | | |
| 2026 | Detective Teekshana | Teekshana | Kannada | | |
