= Allari Pilla =

- Directed by: Kodi Ramakrishna
- Written by: Ganesh Patro (dialogues)
- Story by: Priyadarshan
- Produced by: S. Gopala Reddy
- Starring: Suresh; Meena; Chinna; Kaikala Satyanarayana; Chidathala Apparao
- Cinematography: Ch.Ramanaraju
- Edited by: T. Thirunavukkarasu
- Music by: Vidyasagar
- Production company: Bhargav Art Productions
- Distributed by: Sri Sairam Films, Secunderabad; Sri Lakshmi Pictures, Vijayawada; Sri Satya Narayana Films, Visakhapatnam; SriDevi Pictures, Rajahmundry; Usha Pictures, Eluru; Sri Lalitha Films, Guntur; Sumanth Pictures, Nellore; Sri Satyanarayana Combines, Guntakal; Bhaskara Pictures, Tirupati; S.N.G.Movies, Bengaluru; Sri Varalakshmi Pictures, Berhampur
- Release date: April 23, 1992
- Running time: 136 minutes
- Country: India
- Language: Telugu

Allari Pilla (transl. Naughty Girl) is a 1992 Indian Telugu-language musical-comedy film directed by Kodi Ramakrishna and screenplay was written by Ganesh Patro. The film was remake of the 1991 Malayalam film Kilukkam which was reported to have been inspired by the 1953 movie Roman Holiday. The story revolves around Nandini (Meena), an orphan who comes to Tirupati in search of her father, wherein she meets Taxi Driver cum Tourist guide Raju (Suresh) and his friend (Chinna). It also stars Kaikala Satyanarayana, Chidathala Apparao and Eswara Rao in pivotal roles. The film is the 13th film produced by S. Gopala Reddy under the banner Bhargav Art Productions. and is received well at the box-office.

== Plot ==
Raju (Suresh) is a taxi driver and tourist guide down on his luck. Nandini (Meena), a tourist with intellectual disability, makes her presence in Tirupati and meets Raju, then a series of events are intertwined with the lives of Raju and his friend Nethranandham (Chinna). In the early part of the movie, hilarity ensues in their misguided attempts in getting rid of Nandini. However, Raju and Nethranandham happen to know that she is an escaped mental patient who has a bounty on her safe return. When they find that the bounty has been increasing for a while, they decide to hide Nandini for a while and surrender her to claim the bounty when it gets big enough. They also change her appearance by cutting her long hair short. Nandini reveals her true story to Raju that she was born to her unknown mother and retired Justice Pundarikam (Kaikala Satyanarayana) but is brought up in orphanage. She used to call Pundarikam who used to visit her in orphanage as "Sweet Man" unaware of the fact that he was her father. After knowing the fact that he was her father, she obtains the address of her father from her warden and goes to see her father. In the absence of her father, she was drugged and sent to mental asylum by Pundarikam's sons and daughters-in-law. She managed to escape from the asylum and that is how she met Raju. Raju promises to help Nandini and appoints her as housemaid in her father's home. In time, they realize that things are not as they seem, and more complications are unraveled.

== Cast ==
- Suresh as Raju
- Meena as Nandini
- Chinna as Nethranandham, Photographer
- Kaikala Satyanarayana as Retired Justice Pundarikam
- Chidathala Apparao as Kuppuswamy, Servant
- Eswara Rao as Lawyer, Judge's elder son
- Suryakala as Rajeswari, Judge's elder daughter in law
- Lathasri as Santhi, Judge's handicapped daughter
- Kalpana Rai as School Teacher
- Phani
- Jaggu

== Music ==
The songs were composed by Vidyasagar and lyrics were penned by Vennelakanti Prasad.

No	Song	Artist(s)	Writer
1	"Bhale Chance"	Mano, Lalitha Sagari	Vennelakanti
2	"Alakalaku Lalijo"	Mano, Lalitha Sagari	Vennelakanti
3	"Thoorupu Sindhoorapu"	K. S. Chithra	Vennelakanti
4	"Inta Inta"	Mano, Minmini	Vennelakanti
