= Nenu Premisthunnanu =

- Directed by: E. V. V. Satyanarayana
- Written by: Fazil; Posani Krishna Murali
- Based on: Aniyathipravu (Malayalam)
- Produced by: R. B. Choudary
- Starring: J. D. Chakravarthy; Rachna Banerjee; Sarath Babu
- Edited by: D. Venkata Ratnam
- Music by: Sirpy
- Production company: Super Good Films
- Distributed by: Jayasree Art Pictures
- Release date: 6 June 1997
- Country: India
- Language: Telugu

Nenu Premisthunnanu is a 1997 Indian Telugu-language Romance film, directed by E. V. V. Satyanarayana and written by Fazil. The film stars J.D Chakravarthy and Rachana. The film was a remake of Fazil's Malayalam film Aniyathipravu (1997).

== Plot ==
Chakri and Rachana fall in love and decide to elope. However, they soon regret their choice and return to convince their parents to give their blessing to the couple's union.

== Cast ==
- J. D. Chakravarthy as Chakri
- Rachna Banerjee as Rachana
- Sarath Babu as Rachana's brother
- Srividya as Chakri's mother
- Srihari as Rachana's brother
- Chalapathi Rao as Rachana's brother
- Brahmanandam
- Besant Ravi
- Kaikala Satyanarayana
- Venu as Chaktri's friend
- Prakash as Chakri's friend
- Bandla Ganesh as Chakri's friend

== Soundtrack ==
The song "Kovello Deepama" was reused from composer Sirpy's own Tamil song "Devan Koil" from Naan Pesa Ninaipathellam while "Prema Devinchuma" was reused from composer's another Tamil song "Kadhal Illathathu" from Mani Rathnam.

All music is composed by Sirpy

Track list
No.	Title	Lyrics	Singer(s)	Length
1.	"Luli Luli"	Chandrabose	Mano, Sujatha	4:14
2.	"Andari Mundara"	Sirivennela Seetharama Sastry	S. P. Balasubrahmanyam, K. S. Chithra	4:38
3.	"Prema Devinchuma"	Sirivennela Seetharama Sastry	Mano	4:45
4.	"Prematho Ninu"	Sirivennela Seetharama Sastry	Mano, K. S. Chithra	4:52
5.	"Kovello Depamla"	Sirivennela Seetharama Sastry	S. P. Balasubrahmanyam	4:49
6.	"Baby Baby"	Chandrabose	Hariharan, K. S. Chithra	4:19
Total length:				27:40

== Reception ==
The film was reviewed by Zamin Ryot. A critic from Andhra Today opined that the film was "an entertainer right through" and added that "The story moves fast without a dull moment".
