= Suri (2000 film) =

2001 film by Sankara Kumar

- DVD cover
- Directed by: Sankara Kumar
- Written by: J. D. Chakravarthy (uncredited)
- Produced by: S. T. Reddy
- Starring: J. D. Chakravarthy; Priyanka Trivedi; Snehal Dabi
- Cinematography: Arun
- Edited by: Sankara Kumar
- Music by: Vidyasagar
- Production company: Ravindra Arts
- Release date: 28 December 2000
- Country: India
- Language: Telugu

Suri is a 2000 Telugu-language film directed by Sankara Kumar (Editor Shankar) in his directorial debut. The film stars J. D. Chakravarthy and Priyanka Trivedi. It was produced by Tammareddy Bharadwaja. The lead actor J. D. Chakravarthy also provided the story, screenplay and dialogues for the film, though he was not credited in the movie credits. Suri released on 28 December 2000 and was a box-office disaster.

The film was simultaneously made in Hindi as Durga (2002) for which Chakravarthy was credited as producer and director. However the Hindi version too met the same fate as the Telugu version.

== Cast ==
- J. D. Chakravarthy as Suri
- Priyanka as Gayatri
- Sayaji Shinde
- Aanjjan Srivastav as Gayatri's father
- G. V. Sudhakar Naidu
- Snehal Dabi as Guru
- Jaya Prakash Reddy as Ram Das
- A. V. S.
- Jeeva as the police inspector
- Uttej
- Sana

== Production ==
Shankar, who worked with Ram Gopal Varma and Krishna Vamsi as editor made his debut as a director with the film. Tammareddy Bharadwaja produced the film. Shankar handled both editing and direction. J. D. Chakravarthy who played lead the lead role also provided the story, screenplay and dialogues for the film. But, he was not credited for his writing work in the movie credits. Producer Tammareddy Bharadwaja attributed this to him lacking the required money to put the movie titles or even marketing the film in newspapers.

== Soundtrack ==
The music was composed by Vidyasagar and released by Aditya Music.

Soori

Soundtrack album by Vidyasagar
- Released: 2001
- Recorded: 2001
- Genre: Soundtrack
- Length: 29:51
- Label: Aditya Music
- Producer: Vidyasagar

Vidyasagar chronology
Poovellam Un Vasam (2001)	Soori (2001)	Villain (2002)

Track list
No.	Title	Lyrics	Singer(s)	Length
1.	"Monnatidaka"	Kaluva Krishna Sai	Devan	5:52
2.	"Kottu Kottu"	Kaluva Krishna Sai	Mano	4:24
3.	"Chikkadapalli"	Siddharth	Anuradha Sriram, Ramanan	4:04
4.	"Yemayindo (Female)"	Vennelakanti	K. S. Chithra	5:06
5.	"Gumma Saradaga"	Kaluva Krishna Sai	Mano, Sujatha	4:48
6.	"Sarada Theeraleda"	Kaluva Krishna Sai	Sujatha, S. P. Balasubrahmanyam	5:37
7.	"Yemaindho (Male)"	Vennelakanti	S. P. Balasubrahmanyam	5:06
Total length:				29:51

== Release ==
The film released on 28 December 2000.

== Reception ==
A critic from Indiainfo wrote that "The photography is good. J.D. is okay as ever and the new face Priyanka is also okay. Watch the movie only if you have too much time to waste." A critic from Sify found Suri to be an underwhelming experience, overly reliant on familiar gang war themes, with a predictable climax and underdeveloped love story, despite some decent performances.

A critic from Full Hyderabad wrote that "If only the makers had done a little homework on the screenplay, it would have made an interesting movie." Andhra Today wrote "As the story lacks any novelty, the director's effort doesn't yield desired result. A good story would have won the director accolades. Choosing a subject similar to Ram Gopal Verma's "Satya" proves a minus point for the director".
