= Detective Teekshana =

- Directed by: Trivikram Raghu
- Written by: Trivikram Raghu
- Produced by: G Muni Prasanna; Muni Venkat Charan; Purushotham B Koyyur
- Starring: Priyanka Upendra; Vijay Suriya; Avinash Yelandur
- Cinematography: Manu Dasappa
- Edited by: Sridhar Mandya
- Music by: Peddapalli Rohith
- Production company: Event Linkx Entertainment
- Release date: 7 August 2026
- Country: India
- Language: Kannada

Detective Teekshana is a 2026 Indian Kannada-language action thriller film written and directed by Trivikram Raghu. The film stars Priyanka Upendra, Vijay Suriya, and Avinash Yelandur in the lead roles.

== Premise ==
Teekshana is a brilliant detective who is well known for solving the toughest of cases using her unique techniques, methods and different strategies.

== Cast ==
- Priyanka Upendra as Teekshana
- Vijay Suriya
- Avinash Yelandur
- Muni Venkat Charan
- Sidlingu Sridhar
- Manjunath Hegde

== Release ==
Detective Teekshana was released on 7 August 2026.

== Reception ==
Susmita Sameera of Times Of India said that "Priyanka Upendra Carries A Meandering Mystery". Nirali Kanabar of Cinema Express gave 2.5/5 stars and wrote "Teekshana's clues hit harder than her punches".
