= Ori Nee Prema Bangaram Kaanu =

2003 Indian Telugu-language comedy film

- DVD cover
- Directed by: AVS
- Written by: AVS; Sankaramanchi Parthasaradhi (dialogues)
- Produced by: AVS
- Starring: Rajesh; Sangeetha
- Cinematography: Vasu
- Music by: Mani Sharma
- Production company: Maitree Talkies
- Release date: 16 October 2003
- Country: India
- Language: Telugu

Ori Nee Prema Bangaram Kaanu (transl. May your love be gold) is a 2003 Indian Telugu-language comedy film directed by AVS and starring singer Rajesh in his acting debut and Sangeetha. The film was met with negative reception by critics who criticised Rajesh's acting and the film's lack of story.

== Plot ==
Rajesh, a poor man, falls in love with Sangeeta. In order to win over his daughter, Sangeeta's father challenges Rajesh to keep ₹1 crore rupees safely in a room for a month. How Rajesh manages to do so and win over Sangeeta forms the rest of the story.

== Cast ==
- Rajesh as Rajesh
- Sangeetha as Sangeeta
- Jayaprakash Reddy as Sangeeta's father
- AVS as Gutthi Gurnadham
- Ali as Rajesh's classmate
- Sunil as Rajesh's classmate
- Ananth Babu as Rajesh's classmate
- Venu Madhav as Rajesh's classmate
- Brahmanandam
- Tanikella Bharani
- Chalapathi Rao as a police officer
- Raghu Babu
- Kovai Sarala
- Sana
- Anita Chowdary
- Rama Prabha
- Giri Babu
- Dharmavarapu Subramanyam
- Surya
- Gundu Hanumantha Rao
- M. S. Narayana
- Banerjee
- Bandla Ganesh
- Tirupathi Prakash
- Junior Relangi
- Chitram Srinu
- Ramjagan

== Release and reception ==
The film was initially scheduled to release on 7 August 2003, but was postponed due to financial problems.

A critic from Sify gave the film a negative review and said that "The film, which is a comedy caper can be labelled as the most pathetic film of the year. This is veteran comedian AVS's second directorial venture, but the comedy scenes fail to evoke any laughter among the audiences. Not even a single scene is interesting and on the whole plainly irritating". Jeevi of Idlebrain.com opined that " Though all the comedy artists of the industry are present in this film, the laughter they created is nil" and that "By directing movies, he [AVS] is only losing all the hard-earned good will".

== Box office ==
Similar to Uncle (2000), AVS's first film as a producer, this film was also a box office failure.

== Awards ==
Nandi Awards 2003

- Best Female Comedian - Kovai Sarala

Santosham Film Awards 2004

- Best Comedy Love Story
