= Dipa Shah =

Indian actress

Ananya Shah
- Born: Mumbai, India
- Occupations: Actress, Model
- Years active: 2009–2013

Ananya Shah, better known as Dipa Shah, is an Indian actress who works mainly in South Indian films, television productions, and commercials.

== Career ==
Shah started her film career in 2009, her debut film Ninnu Kalisaka. In 2010, she acted in Yuddham Sei, where she played a trainee police officer. The film was released on 4 February 2011.

She appeared in the film Sillunu Oru Sandhippu. She played Charu, a homely, reserved but strong-minded girl from Ooty. She also has a Malayalam movie, China Town to her credit as well.

== Filmography ==
Year	Film	Role	Language
2009	Ninnu Kalisaka	Deepti	Telugu
2011	Yudham Sei	Thamizh	Tamil
2011	China Town	Chandini	Malayalam
2013	Sillunu Oru Sandhippu	Charumati	Tamil
