= Chinna (actor) =

Indian actor

- Born: 1965 (age 60–61); Nellore, Andhra Pradesh, India
- Occupations: Actor, Director
- Years active: 1989–present
- Parent(s): Ramchandra reddy, Rajeswaramma

Chinna (born Arugunta Jithendra Reddy) is an Indian actor and director, known for his works predominantly in Telugu cinema. He made his Telugu film debut with Ram Gopal Varma's Siva in 1989. His debut movie as hero is Kalyanamaala (1997).

== Early life ==
Chinna was born in Vakadu, Nellore, Andhra Pradesh in 1965.

== Awards ==
Vamsi Berkley Awards

- Best Actor - Allari Pilla (1992).

== Filmography ==
=== As actor ===
==== Films ====
- Aatma Katha (1988)
- Siva (1989) as Chinna
- Bhagavan (1989)
- Jayasimha (1990) as Tommy
- Yuvabharatham (1990)
- Puttinti Pattu Cheera (1990)
- Madhura Nagarilo (1991)
- Mugguru Attala Muddula Alludu (1991)
- Aatma Bandham (1991)
- Chaitanya (1991) as Journalist Sudhakar
- Lathi (1992)
- Allari Pilla (1992) as Photographer Nethranandham
- Chilara Mogudu Allari Koduku (1992)
- Raat (1992) (Hindi-Telugu bilingual film; simultaneously shot in Telugu as Raatri)
- Money (1993) as Bose
- Sabash Ramu (1993)
- Sarasaala Soggadu (1993) as Chinna
- Kishkindha Kanda (1994)
- Lucky Chance (1994)
- Money Money (1994) as Bose
- Rendo Krishnudu (1995)
- Ammaleni Puttillu (1995)
- Aunty (1995)
- Alluda Majaka (1995) as Siva
- Pittala Dora (1996)
- Once More (1996)
- Kurralla Rajyam (1997)
- Ilallu (1997)
- Ratha Yatra (1997)
- Kalyanamaala (1997)
- Antahpuram (1998)
- Life Lo Wife (1998)
- Maa Balaji (1999)
- Bachi (2000)
- Murari (2001)
- Chandu (2001)
- Sontham (2002) as Shesham's friend
- Anveshana (2002)
- Kabaddi Kabaddi (2003) as Mad man
- Ninne Ishtapaddanu (2003) as Boney's relative
- Seenu Vasanthi Lakshmi (2004)
- Kunkuma (2005)
- Gowtam SSC (2005)
- Mee Sreyobhilashi (2007) as Ramakrishna
- Okka Magadu (2008)
- Satyameva Jayate (2009)
- 18,20 Love Story (2009)
- Aa Intlo (2009) as Pavan
- Kalyanam (2009)
- Malli Malli Idi Rani Roju (2015)
- Shankara (2016)
- Mrithyunjay (2026)
- Korean Kanakaraju (2026)

==== Television ====
- Naga Bhairavi (2020–2021) as Veerabhadram
- Nuvvu Nenu Prema (2023–Present) as Narayana
- Geetha LLB (2024-Present)
