= AVS (actor) =

Indian actor

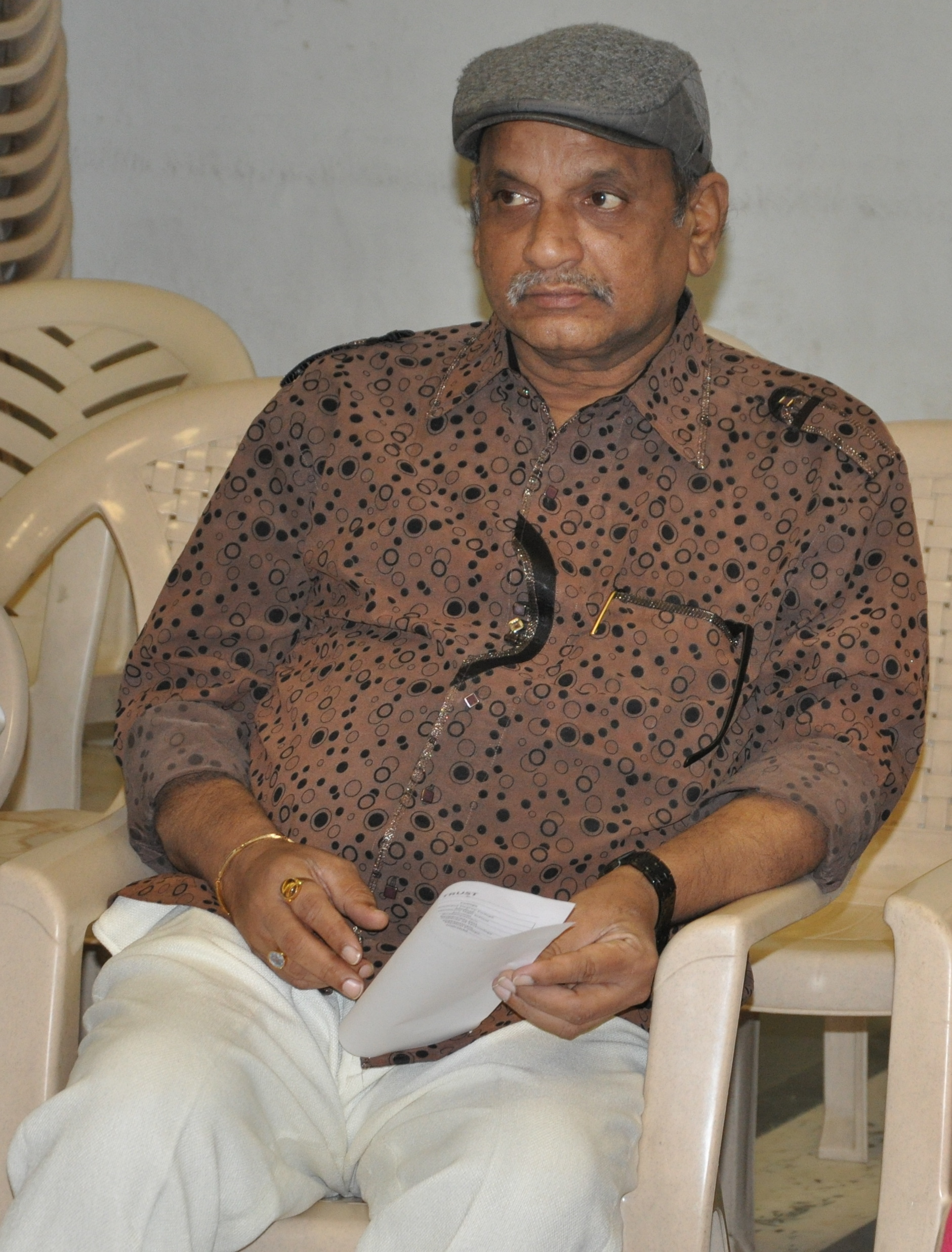
- Late actor AVS at NTR Trust
- Born: Amanchi Venkata Subrahmanyam; 2 January 1957; Tenali, Andhra Pradesh, India
- Died: 8 November 2013 (aged 56); Hyderabad, Andhra Pradesh, (now in Telangana) India
- Occupations: Actor; comedian; producer; director
- Years active: 1991–2013

Amanchi Venkata Subrahmanyam (2 January 1957 – 8 November 2013), better known and credited by his initials AVS, was an Indian actor, comedian, producer, director, and journalist known for his works in Telugu cinema. A.V.S. was known particularly for his comic dialogue delivery, and expressions. He starred in over five hundred feature films and has garnered four state Nandi Awards, including Best Comedian, and Best character actor.

== Early life and career ==
AVS was born on 2 January 1957 in Tenali, Guntur district, Andhra Pradesh. He was introduced to the film industry by director Bapu through his film Mister Pellam in 1993. With this film, he became a comedy star in the Telugu film industry. For his role he received many awards including Nandi Award by Government of Andhra Pradesh. He won many private and Government awards for both in films and in TV shows. He produced two films: Uncle and Ori Nee Prema Bangaaram Kanu...! and directed four films, namely Super Heroes, Ori Ni Prema Bangaaram Kaanu..!, Roommates, and Kothimooka. He was General Secretary of the Movie Artistes Association for 3 terms.

== Death ==
AVS sustained kidney and liver trauma for some days. He had a liver transplant in 2008. He died on 8 November 2013 at his son's residence in Manikonda, Hyderabad after multiple organ failure.

== Selected filmography ==
=== As actor ===
List of films and roles
Year	Title	Role	Notes
1991	Palleturi Pellam		
1993	Mr. Pellam	Gopal	
1993	Mayalodu	Supermarket owner	
1993	Srinatha Kavi Sarvabhomudu		
1993	One by Two		
1993	Abbayigaru		
1993	Ish Gup Chup		
1994	Lucky Chance		
1994	Madam		
1994	Pacha Thoranam		
1994	Nannagaru		
1994	Yamaleela		
1994	Subhalagnam	Madhu's house owner	
1994	Pelli Koduku		
1994	Bangaru Kutumbam		
1994	Kishkindha Kanda		
1994	Police Alludu	Kamesam	
1994	Allari Premikudu	Chandram 's assistant	
1994	Aame		
1994	Super Police	Constable	
1994	Punya Bhoomi Naa Desam		
1995	Rikshavodu	G. K. RMP's Assistant	
1995	Ghatotkachudu		
1995	Alluda Majaka	Konda Babu/Gundela Mandela	
1995	Telugu Veera Levara	Supply Subbarao	
1995	Aadaalla Majaka		
1995	Ooriki Monagadu		
1995	Mayabazaar		
1995	Sankalpam		
1995	Ketu Duplicatu		
1995	Sisindri	House Owner	
1995	Rambantu		
1995	Vajram		
1995	Vaddu Bava Thappu		
1995	Subhamasthu	Priest	
1996	Akkada Abbai Ikkada Ammayi	S.I.	
1996	Dharma Chakram	Gumastha Gurulingam	
1996	Oho Naa Pellanta		
1996	Mummy Mee Aayanochadu		
1996	Prema Prayanam		
1996	Jabilamma Pelli		
1996	Nalla Pussalu		
1996	Gunshot		
1996	Puttinti Gowravam		
1996	Bombay Priyudu		
1996	Topi Raja Sweety Roja		
1996	Sahanam		
1996	Hello Guru		
1996	Family		
1996	Ladies Doctor		
1996	Ramudochadu		
1996	Sri Krishnarjuna Vijayam		
1996	Intlo Illalu Vantintlo Priyuralu	Doctor	
1996	Vinodam		
1997	Korukunna Priyudu		
1997	Kaliyugam Lo Gandargolam		Also director
1997	Collector Garu		
1997	Veedevadandi Babu		
1997	Priyaragalu		
1997	Vammo Vatto O Pellaamo		
1997	Pelli Sandadi	Kalyani and Swapna's uncle	
1997	Chilakkottudu		
1997	Priyamaina Sreevaru		
1997	Oka Chinna Maata		
1997	Chinnabbayi		
1997	Priya O Priya		
1997	Super Heroes		
1997	Annamayya		
1997	Master	David	
1997	Adavilo Anna		
1998	Paradesi	Bagara Raju	
1998	Rajahamsa		
1998	Ulta Palta		
1998	Subhakankshalu	Nadabrahmam	
1998	Maavidaakulu	Aaha TV owner	
1998	Kante Koothurne Kanu		
1998	Life Lo Wife		
1998	Pape Naa Pranam		
1998	Aavida Maa Aavide	Hotel owner	
1998	Sri Ramulayya		
1998	Choodalani Vundi		
1998	Suprabhatam		Gopala Krishna's boss
1998	Kalavari Chellelu Kanaka Mahalakshmi		
1998	Subhalekhalu		
1999	Samarasimha Reddy		
1999	Yamajathakudu	Vichitra Gupta	
1999	Raja		
1999	Bharata Ratna		
1999	Sooryavansham		Hindi film
1999	Alludugaaru Vachcharu		
1999	Rajakumarudu	Rajyalakshmi's brother	
1999	Iddaru Mitrulu		
1999	Krishna Babu		
1999	Ravoyi Chandamama	V. K. Sonty	
1999	Vichitram	Parandhamayya	
1999	Mechanic Mavayya		
2000	Sammakka Sarakka		
2000	Postman		
2000	Pelli Sambandham		
2000	Manasu Paddanu Kaani		
2000	Kante Koothurne Kanu		
2000	Maa Pelliki Randi	Apparao	
2000	Thilaadanam		
2000	Kalisundam Raa	Venkatadri	
2000	Yuvaraju		
2000	Chitram		
2000	Jayam Manadera	Sonthi Paramahamsa	
2000	Bachi		
2000	Suri		
2000	Devullu		
2000	Maa Annayya		
2000	Vijayaramaraju		
2000	Uncle	Jagadish Chandraprasad / Veeraswamy (Uncle)	Also producer
2001	Pandanti Samsaram		
2001	Appa Rao Ki Oka Nela Thappindi		
2001	Chinna	Photographer	
2001	Narahari		
2001	Chandu		
2001	Akasa Veedhilo		
2001	Adhipathi		
2001	Cheppalani Vundhi		
2001	Veedekkadi Mogudandi		
2001	Muthyam	Dr. G. Sivarama Krishna	
2001	Athanu		
2001	Subbu		
2002	Chandravamsam		
2002	Durga		Hindi film
2002	Indra		
2002	Vachina Vaadu Suryudu	College principal	
2002	Pilisthe Palukutha	Shanti's father	
2002	Kadhal Azhivathillai		Tamil film
2002	Premalo Pavani Kalyan		
2003	Gangotri		
2003	The Rite, a Passion		
2003	Vijayam	H. Umapathi	
2003	Sivamani		
2003	Villain		
2003	Ori Nee Prema Bangaram Kaanu		Also director and producer
2004	Donga Dongadi		
2004	Venky	Bokka	
2004	Varsham		
2004	Shiva Shankar		
2004	Aaptudu		
2005	786 Khaidi Premakatha		
2005	Orey Pandu		
2005	Sankranthi	Supermarket owner	
2005	Radha Gopalam		
2005	Allari Pidugu		
2005	Veeri Veeri Gummadi Pandu		
2005	Mahanandi		
2005	Jai Chiranjeeva	Priest	
2006	Sri Ramadasu		
2006	Bangaram		
2006	Roommates		Director
2007	Gundamma Gaari Manavadu	Priest	
2007	Madhumasam		
2007	Yamagola Malli Modalayindi		
2007	Nava Vasantham		Special appearance in a song
2007	Godava		
2008	Veedu Mamoolodu Kadu		
2008	Kuberulu		
2008	King		
2009	Neramu Siksha		
2009	Bendu Apparao RMP		
2009	Baanam		
2010	Young India	A. V. S. Maniyam	
2010	Dasanna		
2010	Brahmalokam To Yamalokam Via Bhulokam		
2010	Kothimooka	Beggar	Also director
2011	Jai Bolo Telangana		
2011	Mayagadu		
2011	Sri Rama Rajyam		
2012	Denikaina Ready	Sastry	
2013	Balupu		
2013	Pavitra		
2014	Hum Tum		
2014	Sri Vasavi Kanyaka Parameswari Charitra		

=== Other crew positions ===
Year	Film	Director	Story	Screenplay	Producer	Notes
1997	Super Heroes	Yes	Yes	Yes	No	
2000	Uncle	No	Yes	Yes	Yes	Also lyricist
2003	Ori Nee Prema Bangaram Kaanu	Yes	Yes	Yes	Yes	
2006	Roommates	Yes	Yes	Yes	No	
2010	Kothimooka	Yes	Yes	Yes	No	

=== As voice actor ===
- 2000 Thenali - for Delhi Ganesh (Telugu version)

=== Television ===
- Popula Pette (1997)

== Awards ==
Nandi Awards

- Special Jury Award - Mr. Pellam - 1993
- Best Male Comedian - Subha Lagnam - 1994
- Special Jury Award - Uncle (2000)
- Best Character Actor - Kothimooka (2011)
