= Money Money (film) =

1994 Telugu film by Siva Nageswara Rao

- Title card
- Directed by: Siva Nageswara Rao; Krishna Vamsi (uncredited)
- Written by: Uttej (dialogues)
- Screenplay by: Siva Nageswara Rao
- Story by: Siva Nageswara Rao
- Produced by: Ram Gopal Varma
- Starring: J. D. Chakravarthy; Chinna; Jayasudha; Renuka Shahane; Surabhi; Paresh Rawal; Brahmanandam
- Cinematography: Rasool Ellore
- Edited by: Shankar
- Music by: Sri
- Production company: Varma Creations
- Release date: February 25, 1994
- Running time: 152 minutes
- Country: India
- Language: Telugu

Money Money is a 1994 Indian Telugu-language comedy film written and directed by Siva Nageswara Rao and produced by Ram Gopal Varma under his banner, Varma Creations. The film is a sequel to the 1993 film Money, making it one of the earliest sequels in Telugu cinema. Krishna Vamsi is believed to have directed the film, though he was not credited in the titles.

The film features an ensemble cast, including J. D. Chakravarthy, Chinna, Jayasudha, Renuka Shahane, Surabhi, Paresh Rawal, and Brahmanandam, who reprised their roles from the previous film. The music for Money Money was composed by Sri. The film was a success at the box office.

A sequel titled Money Money, More Money was released in 2011, with J. D. Chakravarthy and Brahmanandam reprising their roles.

== Cast ==
- J. D. Chakravarthy as Chakri
- Chinna as Bose
- Jayasudha as Vijaya
- Renuka Shahane as Renu
- Surabhi as Sudha
- Kota Srinivasa Rao as Allaudin
- Brahmanandam as Khan Dada
- Paresh Rawal as Subba Rao
- Tanikella Bharani as Manikyam & Lawyer Saab (Dual role)
- Sharat Saxena as a Police officer
- Brahmaji as Brahmaji
- Jeedigunta Sridhar as Mental Doctor
- Kadambari Kiran as Telephone Booth Owner
- Chinnu Krishna as Peon
- Kallu Chidambaram as Lawyer
- Tarzan as Jaggu
- Uttej as Yadagiri
- Narsing Yadav as Narsing
- Jagapathi Babu (cameo) as Durga (cameo appearance in the song "Paadu Kaburu Vinagaane")
- Urmila Matondkar (cameo) as Chitra (cameo appearance in the song "Paadu Kaburu Vinagaane")
- Banerjee (cameo) as Benerjee (cameo appearance in the song "Paadu Kaburu Vinagaane")

== Production ==
Money (1993), directed by Siva Nageswara Rao and produced by Ram Gopal Varma, became a major success. Following its success, Ram Gopal Varma decided to create a sequel, Money Money, as sequels were uncommon in Indian cinema at the time. He asked Krishna Vamsi, who had worked as an assistant director on Money, to direct the sequel. Krishna Vamsi initially expressed reservations, as he did not want to launch his directorial career with this kind of film. However, Ram Gopal Varma insisted, and Krishna Vamsi set a condition that his name would not appear in the credits, opting for ghost direction instead. Ram Gopal Varma assured him that after seeing the finished product, Krishna Vamsi would want to take credit.

Under Krishna Vamsi's direction, Money Money was made, with the director experimenting with various techniques. One song was shot using just four shots, while another took 357 shots. The former, "Em Kompa Munagadoi," was completed in six hours, whereas the Chakravarthy and Surabhi duet "Left and Right Endukanta" took six days to film at Golkonda Fort. Krishna Vamsi’s unconventional approach led to some criticism from Ram Gopal Varma for the perceived inconsistency in the shooting process.

After completing the film, Ram Gopal Varma gave Krishna Vamsi the option to change his mind about the director's credit. When Krishna Vamsi refused, Ram Gopal Varma requested Siva Nageswara Rao to lend his name, and the film was released with Nageswara Rao’s name in the credits. Krishna Vamsi then detached himself from the film.

The film features an ensemble cast, including J. D. Chakravarthy, Chinna, Jayasudha, Renuka Shahane, Surabhi, Paresh Rawal, and Brahmanandam, who reprised their roles from the previous film. Jagapathi Babu, Urmila Matondkar, and others appear in cameo roles, reprising their roles from Gaayam (1993), also directed by Ram Gopal Varma.

== Music ==
Money Money

Film score by Sri
- Released: 1995
- Genre: Soundtrack
- Length: 20:51
- Label: VMG Cassettes
- Producer: Sri

The music for the film was composed by Sri, with lyrics written by Sirivennela Sitarama Sastry. The soundtrack was released by VMG Cassettes. Notably, the song "Paadu Kaburu Vinagaane" served as a parody of "Gundello Dhada Dhada" from Antham (1992).

No.	Title	Singer(s)	Length
1.	"Aarukotla Andhrulu"	S. P. Balasubrahmanyam	4:21
2.	"Em Kompa"	Mano	3:26
3.	"What A Pity"	J. D. Chakravarthy, Ram Chakravarthy, Chitra	4:21
4.	"Left & Right"	Ram Chakravarthy, Radhika	3:57
5.	"Ooru Vaada"	Ram Chakravarthy, Mano, Chitra, Radhika, Swarnalatha	4:46
Total length:			20:51

== Reception ==
Money Money was a success at the box office.

== Sequel ==
A sequel titled Money Money, More Money, directed by J. D. Chakravarthy, was released in 2011. J. D. Chakravarthy and Brahmanandam reprise their roles as Chakri and Khan Dada, respectively. It is a remake of the 2006 Hindi film Darwaza Bandh Rakho, also directed by Chakravarthy. However, some observers consider it more of a standalone film, with only a few scenes featuring Brahmanandam and Chakravarthy that establish a connection to the earlier Money films.
