= Nandi Awards of 1985 =

Indian Telugu film and TV awards ceremony

Nandi Awards Winners List in the year of 1985

== Winners list ==
Category	Winner	Film
Best Feature Film		Mayuri
Second Best Feature Film		O Thandri Theerpu
Third Best Feature Film		Vande Mataram
Best Actor	Murali Mohan	Manoharam
Best Actress	Vijayashanti	Pratighatana
Best Director	Singeetam Srinivasa Rao	Mayuri
Best Supporting Actor	Suthivelu	Pratighatana
Best Supporting Actress	Nirmalamma	Mayuri
Best Character Actor		
Nandi Award for Best Character Actress		
Best Cinematographer	Hari Anumolu	Mayuri
Best Story Writer		Mayuri
Best Screenplay Writer	Singeetam Srinivasa Rao	Mayuri
Best Dialogue Writer	M.V.S. Harnatha Rao	Pratighatana
Best Lyricist	Veturi	Pratighatana (Ee Duryodhana Dussaasana)
Best Male Playback Singer	S. P. Balasubrahmanyam	Mayuri
Best Female Playback Singer	S. Janaki	Pratighatana
Best Music Director	S. P. Balasubrahmanyam	Mayuri
Best Art Director	V. Bhaskara Raju	Mayuri
Best First Film of a Director		
Best Audiographer	Emmy	Mayuri
Best Editor	K. Gautham Raju	Mayuri
Best Male Comedian	Suthivelu	Devalayam
Best Female Comedian		
Best Villain	Charan Raj	Pratighatana
Best Choreographer	V. Seshu Parupalli	Mayuri
Special Jury Award	P. L. Narayana	Mayuri
Special Jury Award	Sudha Chandran	Mayuri
Special Jury Award	Kota Srinivasa Rao	Pratighatana
Nandi Award for Best Educational Film		Bhoosaara Pariksha
