= Siva Nageswara Rao =

Indian film director and screenwriter

- Born: 1956 (age 69–70); Uppalapadu, Guntur district, Andhra Pradesh, India
- Occupations: Film director; screenwriter
- Years active: 1993–present

Siva Nageswara Rao is an Indian film director and screenwriter known for his work to Telugu cinema, particularly in the comedy genre. His notable films as a director include Money (1993), Money Money (1994), Lucky Chance (1994), Sisindri (1995), Pattukondi Chuddam (1997), Hands Up! (2000), Dhanalakshmi, I Love You (2002), Mr & Mrs Sailaja Krishnamurthy (2004), and Bhookailas (2007).

== Early life ==
Siva Nageswara Rao was born and brought up in Uppalapadu near Guntur. He was fascinated by films from childhood. He graduated from Hindu College in Guntur.

== Career ==
Rao moved to Madras to join Telugu film industry in 1979 at the age of 23. He acted in films like Burripalem Bullodu (1979) and Sannayi Appanna (1980) as unofficial junior artist.

He joined as an assistant director to Vijaya Nirmala and worked under her for the films Antham Kaadidi Aarambham (1981) and Doctor Cine Actor (1982). Later he worked with Lenin Babu for Maro Kurukshetram (1981), V. Madhusudhana Rao for Jagannatha Ratha Chakraalu (1982), S. A. Chandrasekhar for Balidaanam (1983), Devanthakudu (1984), and Intiko Rudramma (1985). He then started working for Kranthi Kumar with Swathi (1984) and was a part of his direction team for six years.

Rao met film director Ram Gopal Varma during the making of the film Rao Gaari Illu (1988) on which both Varma and Siva Nageswara Rao worked as assistant directors. While working on that film, Varma asked him to work as an assistant director in Siva (1989).

Siva Nageswara Rao's debut film as a director was Money (1993) and was produced by Ram Gopal Varma.

== Filmography ==
=== As director and screenwriter ===
Year	Title	Notes
1993	Money	Also story writer
1993	One by Two	
1994	Lucky Chance	
1994	Money Money	
1995	Sisindri	
1996	Once More	
1997	Pattukondi Chuddam	
1998	O Panaipothundi Babu	
2000	Hands Up!	
2002	Ramana	
2002	Dhanalakshmi, I Love You	
2004	Mr & Mrs Sailaja Krishnamurthy	
2006	Photo	
2007	Bhookailas	
2009	Ninnu Kalisaka	
2016	Over Action	
2023	Dochevaarevarura	

=== As an actor ===
Year	Title	Role	Notes
1979	Burripalem Bullodu		Junior artist
1980	Sannayi Appanna		Junior artist
2009	Ninnu Kalisaka	Prem Baba	

== Awards ==
- Won Nandi Award for Best First Film of a Director - Money (1993)
