= Nandi Awards of 2014 =

Indian Telugu film and TV awards ceremony

Nandi Awards for the year 2014 announced by Andhra Pradesh Government on 14 November 2017. The Nandamuri Balakrishna starrer Legend emerged as a big winner by winning eight awards for the year. The NTR National award for the year was conferred upon actor Kamal Haasan.

== Winners list ==
| Category | Winner | Film | Nandi Type |
|---|---|---|---|
| Best Feature Film | Ram Achanta; Gopichand Achanta; Anil Sunkara | Legend | Gold |
| Second Best Feature Film | Nagarjuna Akkineni | Manam | Silver |
| Third Best Feature Film | KSV | Hitudu | Bronze |
| Best Actor | Nandamuri Balakrishna | Legend | Silver |
| Best Director | Boyapati Srinu | Legend | Silver |
| Best Actress | Anjali | Geethanjali | Silver |
| Best Supporting Actor | Naga Chaitanya | Manam | Copper |
| Best Supporting Actress | Lakshmi Manchu | Chandamama Kathalu | Copper |
| Best Character Actor | Rajendra Prasad | Tommy | Copper |
| Best Male Comedian | Brahmanandam | Race Gurram | Copper |
| Best Female Comedian | Vidyullekha Raman | Run Raja Run | Copper |
| Best Villain | Jagapati Babu | Legend | Copper |
| Best Cinematographer | Sai Sriram | Ala Ela | Copper |
| Best Music Director | Anup Rubens | Manam | Copper |
| Best Editor | Kotagiri Venkateswara Rao | Legend | Copper |
| Best Art Director | Vijay Krishna | Hanuman Chalisa | Copper |
| Best Screenplay Writer | A. S. Ravikumar Chowdary | Pilla Nuvvu Leni Jeevitham | Copper |
| Best Story Writer | Krishna Vamsi | Govindudu Andarivadele | Copper |
| Best Dialogue Writer | M. Ratnam | Legend | Copper |
| Best Lyricist | Chaitanya Prasad | Broker 2 | Copper |
| Nandi Award for Akkineni Award for best home-viewing feature film | Changodi Hari Babu; Bosam Chinna Babu | Tommy | Silver |
| Best Popular Film for Providing Wholesome Entertainment | V. Anand Prasad | Loukyam | Gold |
| Best Children's Film | Chilumula Shanthikumar | Atreya | Gold |
| Best Documentary Film | | | Gold |
| Best Film Critic on Telugu Cinema | Kathi Mahesh | | Copper |
| Sarojini Devi Award for a Film on National Integration | Bhaskarrao Vedrathi | Prabhanjanam | Gold |
| Best Male Playback Singer | Vijay Yesudas | Legend | Copper |
| Best Female Playback Singer | K. S. Chithra | Mukunda | Copper |
| Best Child Actor | Gautham Krishna | 1: Nenokkadine | Copper |
| Best Child Actress | Anuhya | Atreya | Copper |
| Best First Film of a Director | Chandoo Mondeti | Karthikeya | Copper |
| Best Choreographer | Prem Rakshith | Aagadu | Copper |
| Best Audiographer | E. Radhakrishna | Karthikeya | Copper |
| Best Costume Designer | Uddandu | OriDevudoy | Copper |
| Best Makeup Artist | Krishna | | Copper |
| Best Fight Master | Ram Laxman | Legend | Copper |
| Best Special Effects | Raghunath | Legend | Copper |
| Best Male Dubbing Artist | P. Ravi Shankar | Race Gurram | Copper |
| Best Female Dubbing Artist | Chinmayi | Manam | Copper |
| Nandi Award for Best Book on Telugu Cinema (Books, posters, etc.) | | | Copper |
| Special Jury Award | Srinivas Avasarala | Oohalu Gusagusa Lade | Copper |
| Special Jury Award | Meka Ramkrishna | | Copper |
| Special Jury Award | Krishna Rao | | Copper |

== Controversy ==
There was a huge uproar about Nandi Awards jury committee. Many film producers, directors, film critics and public had a contradicting view on the awards' final list. Film critic Kaathi Mahesh said the awards selection committee has a conflict of interest in awarding the final list. He named film actor Balakrishna in his statement.

== See also ==
- Nandi Awards of 2013
