= Nandi Awards of 2002 =

Indian Telugu film and TV awards ceremony

The Nandi Awards are presented annually in Andhra Pradesh, For Telugu cinema by State government. "Nandi" means "bull", the awards being named after the big granite bull at Lepakshi — a cultural and historical symbol of Andhra Pradesh. Nandi Awards are presented in four categories: Gold, Silver, Bronze, and Copper.

== 2002 Nandi Awards Winners List ==
Category	Winner	Film
Best Feature Film	Nagarjuna Akkineni	Manmadhudu
Second Best Feature Film	Sravanthi Ravi Kishore	Nuvve Nuvve
Third Best Feature Film	K. L. Narayana	Santhosham
Nandi Award for Akkineni Award for best home-viewing feature film	K. S. Rama Rao	Vasu
Sarojini Devi Award for a Film on National Integration	Sunkara Madhu Murali	Khadgam
Best Director	Krishna Vamsi	Khadgam
Best Actor	Chiranjeevi; Nagarjuna	Indra; Santosham
Best Actress	Kalyani	Avunu Valliddaru Ista Paddaru
Best Supporting Actor	Prakash Raj	Khadgam
Best Supporting Actress	Bhanupriya	Lahiri Lahiri Lahirilo
Best Character Actor	Nandamuri Harikrishna	Lahiri Lahiri Lahirilo
Best Male Comedian	Suman Setty	Jayam
Best Female Comedian	Rama Prabha	Lahiri Lahiri Lahirilo
Best Villain	Gopichand; Ahuti Prasad	Jayam; Nenu Ninnu Premistunnanu
Best Child Actor	Master Kaushic Babu	Takkari Donga
Best Child Actress	Baby Swetha	Jayam
Best First Film of a Director	V. V. Vinayak	Aadi
Best Screenplay Writer	Muppalaneni Shiva	Nee Premakai
Best Story Writer	P. V. Shanti	Manasunte Chaalu
Best Dialogue Writer	Trivikram Srinivas	Nuvve Nuvve
Best Lyricist	Chandrabose	Aadi
Best Cinematographer	Jayanan Vincent	Takkari Donga
Best Music Director	M. M. Keeravani	Okato Number Kurradu
Best Male Playback Singer	S. P. Balasubrahmanyam	Vasu
Best Female Playback Singer	Usha	Nee Sneham
Best Editor	Gautham Raju	Aadi
Best Art Director	P. Ranga Rao	Khadgam
Best Choreographer	Raghava Lawrence	Indra
Best Audiographer	P. Madhusudhan Reddy	Takkari Donga
Best Costume Designer	Ganapathi	Avunu Valliddaru Ista Paddaru
Best Makeup Artist	Kishore	Khadgam
Best Fight Master	Vijay	Takkari Donga
Best Male Dubbing Artist	P. Ravi Shankar	Indra
Best Female Dubbing Artist	Sunitha	Jayam
Special Jury Award	Jr.NTR	Aadi
Special Jury Award	Mahesh Babu	Takkari Donga
Special Jury Award	Ravi Teja	Khadgam
