= Filmfare Award for Best Supporting Actor – Telugu =

Indian annual film award

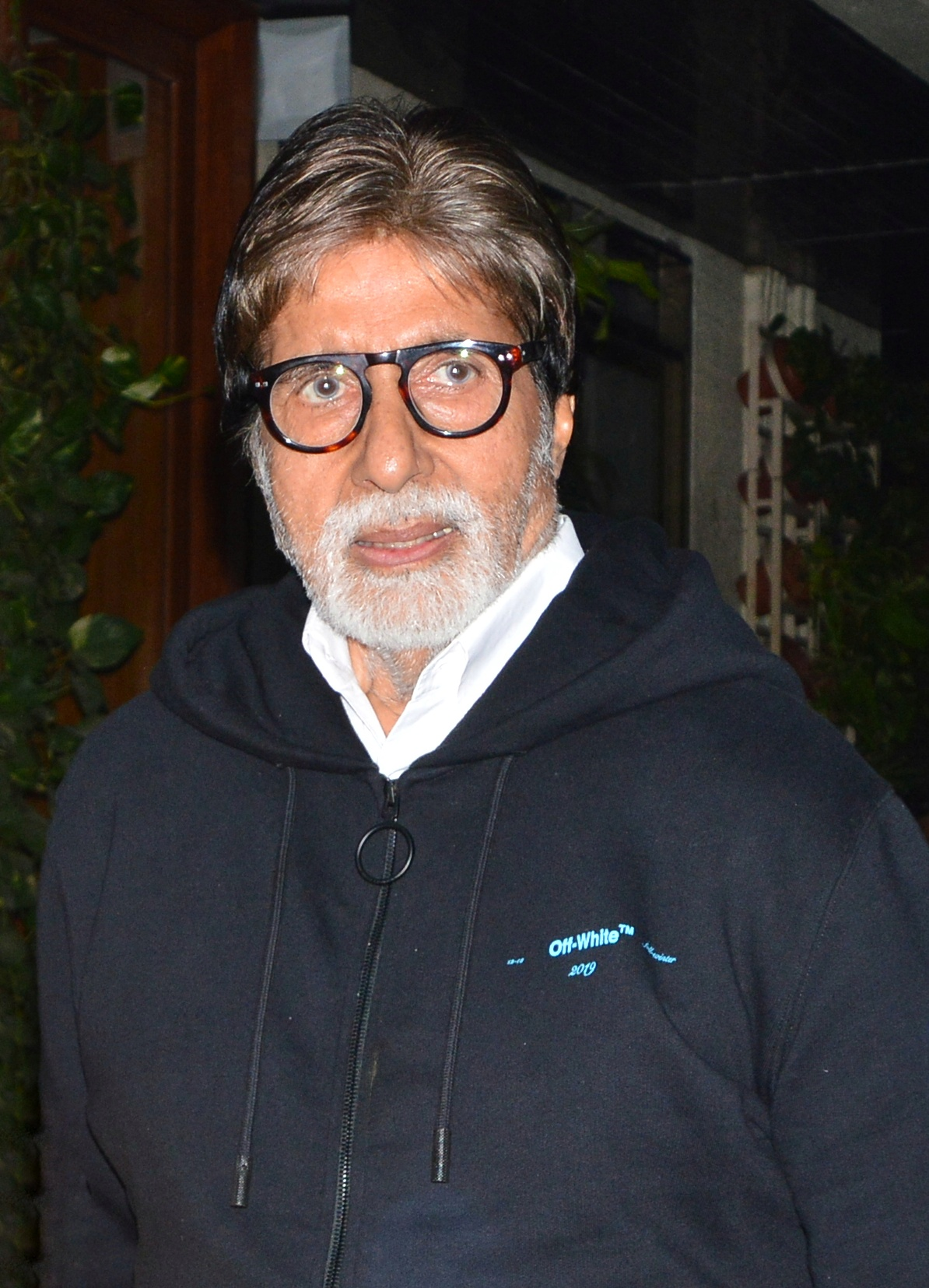
- The 2024 recipient: Amitabh Bachchan
- Awarded for: Best Performance by an Actor in a Supporting Role in Telugu films
- Country: India
- Presented by: Filmfare
- First award: Prakash Raj for Nuvve Nuvve(2002)
- Currently held by: Amitabh Bachchan for Kalki 2898 AD (2024)

Highlights
- Most wins: Jagapathi Babu (4)
- Most nominations: Prakash Raj (11)
- Website: http://awards.filmfare.com/telegu/best-actor-supporting-male.php

The Filmfare Award for Best Supporting Actor – Telugu is given by the Filmfare magazine as part of its annual Filmfare Awards for Telugu films. The award was introduced and first given at the 50th South Filmfare Awards in 2002, with Prakash Raj being the first recipient.

== Winners ==
Here is a list of the award winners and the films for which they won.

Year	Actor	Role	Film	Ref
2024	Amitabh Bachchan	Ashwatthama	Kalki 2898 AD
2023	Brahmanandam	Chakrapani	Ranga Maarthaanda
2023	Ravi Teja	Vikram Sagar	Waltair Veerayya
2022	Rana Daggubati	Daniel Shekhar	Bheemla Nayak
2020 / 21	Murali Sharma	Valmiki	Ala Vaikunthapurramuloo
2019	AWARDS FUNCTION WAS SUSPENDED DUE TO COVID-19 PANDEMIC
2018	Jagapathi Babu	Basi Reddy	Aravinda Sametha Veera Raghava
2017	Rana Daggubati	Bhallala Deva	Baahubali: The Conclusion
2016	Jagapati Babu	Krishna Murthy Kautilya	Nannaku Prematho
2015	Allu Arjun	Gona Ganna Reddy	Rudhramadevi
2014	Jagapati Babu	Jitendra	Legend
2013	Sunil	Sivarama Krishna	Tadakha
2012	Sudeepa	Sudeep	Eega
2011	M. S. Narayana	Bokka Venkata Rao	Dookudu
2010	P. Sai Kumar	Lokanatham Naidu	Prasthanam
2009	Sonu Sood	Pasupathy	Arundhati
2008	Allari Naresh	Gaali Seenu	Gamyam
2007	Jagapati Babu	ACP Bose	Lakshyam
2006	P. Sai Kumar	Bhagawan Raj	Samanyudu
2005	Srihari	Sivarama Krishna	Nuvvostanante Nenoddantana
2004	Srikanth	ATM	Shankar Dada M.B.B.S.
2003	Prakash Raj	Suryam	Tagore
2002	Prakash Raj	Vishwanath	Nuvve Nuvve

== Nominations ==
- 2024: Amitabh Bachchan – Kalki 2898 AD
  - Dhananjaya – Zebra
  - Fahadh Faasil – Pushpa 2: The Rule
  - Satya – Mathu Vadalara 2
  - S. J. Suryah – Saripodhaa Sanivaaram
  - Vinay Rai – Hanu-Man
- 2023: Brahmanandam – Ranga Maarthaanda and Ravi Teja – Waltair Veerayya
  - Dheekshith Shetty – Dasara
  - Kota Jayaram – Balagam
  - Naresh – Samajavaragamana
  - Vishnu Oi – Keedaa Cola
- 2022: Rana Daggubati – Bheemla Nayak
  - Ajay Devgn – RRR
  - Sumanth – Sita Ramam
  - Naresh – Ante Sundaraniki
  - Satyadev – Godfather
  - Muralidhar Goud – DJ Tillu
- 2020–2021: Murali Sharma – Ala Vaikunthapurramuloo
  - Jagapathi Babu – Republic
  - Praveen – Naandhi
  - Rahul Ramakrishna – Jathi Ratnalu
  - Sunil – Pushpaka Vimanam
  - Thiruveer – Palasa 1978
  - Vennela Kishore – Bheeshma
- 2018: Jagapathi Babu – Aravinda Sametha Veera Raghava
  - Aadhi Pinisetty – Rangasthalam
  - Doddanna – Aatagadharaa Siva
  - Mohan Bhagat – C/o Kancharapalem
  - Naresh – Sammohanam
  - R. Madhavan – Savyasachi
  - Rahul Ramakrishna – Geetha Govindam
- 2017: Rana Daggubati – Baahubali 2: The Conclusion
  - Aadhi Pinisetty – Ninnu Kori
  - Prakash Raj – Sathamanam Bhavati
  - S. J. Suryah – Spyder
  - Sathyaraj – Baahubali 2: The Conclusion
- 2016: Jagapati Babu – Nannaku Prematho
  - Arvind Swamy – Dhruva
  - Mohanlal – Janatha Garage
  - Rao Ramesh – A Aa
  - Sathyaraj – Nenu Sailaja
  - Akkineni Nagarjuna – Oopiri
- 2015: Allu Arjun – Rudhramadevi
  - Jagapati Babu – Srimanthudu
  - Posani Krishna Murali – Temper
  - Rana Daggubati – Baahubali: The Beginning
  - Sathyaraj – Baahubali: The Beginning
- 2014: Jagapati Babu – Legend
  - Ajay – Dikkulu Choodaku Ramayya
  - Prakash Raj – Govindudu Andarivadele
  - P. Sai Kumar – Yevadu
  - Srikanth – Govindudu Andarivadele
- 2013: Sunil – Tadakha
  - Brahmaji – Venkatadri Express
  - Prakash Raj – Seethamma Vakitlo Sirimalle Chettu
  - Sundeep Kishan – Gundello Godari
  - Venkatesh – Masala
- 2012: Sudeepa – Eega
  - Brahmanandam – Denikaina Ready
  - P. Ravi Shankar – Damarukam
  - Posani Krishna Murali – Krishnam Vande Jagadgurum
  - Rajendra Prasad – Julayi
- 2011: M. S. Narayana – Dookudu
  - Akkineni Nageswara Rao – Sri Rama Rajyam
  - Jagapati Babu – Jai Bolo Telangana
  - Prakash Raj – Dookudu
  - Sonu Sood – Kandireega
- 2010: P. Sai Kumar – Prasthanam
  - Allari Naresh – Shambo Shiva Shambo
  - Brahmanandam – Adhurs
  - Naresh – Andari Bandhuvaya
  - Shafi – Khaleja
- 2009: Sonu Sood – Arundhati
  - Prakash Raj – Aakasamantha
  - Sayaji Shinde – Arundhati
  - Srihari – Magadheera
  - Venkatesh – Eenadu
- 2008: Allari Naresh – Gamyam
  - Brahmanandam – Ready
  - Jagapati Babu – Kathanayakudu
  - Prakash Raj – Kotha Bangaru Lokam
  - Srinivas Avasarala – Ashta Chamma
- 2007: Jagapati Babu – Lakshyam
  - Mohan Babu – Yamadonga
  - Rahul Haridas – Happy Days
  - Ravi Babu – Anasuya
  - Srihari – Dhee
- 2006: P. Sai Kumar – Samanyudu
  - Nassar – Pokiri
  - Prakash Raj – Bommarillu
  - Rajendra Prasad – Bhagyalakshmi Bumper Draw
- 2005: Srihari – Nuvvostanante Nenoddantana
  - Jagapati Babu – Anukokunda Oka Roju
  - Shafi – Chhatrapati
  - Srihari – Mahanandi
  - Srikanth – Sankranti
- 2004: Srikanth – Shankar Dada M.B.B.S.
  - Kota Srinivasa Rao – Aa Naluguru
  - Shashank – Sye
  - Sunil – Mass
- 2003: Prakash Raj – Tagore
  - Krishnam Raju – Neeku Nenu Naaku Nuvvu
  - Prakash Raj – Amma Nanna O Tamila Ammayi
  - Shashank – Aithe
- 2002: Prakash Raj – Nuvve Nuvve
  - Nandamuri Harikrishna – Lahiri Lahiri Lahirilo
  - Prakash Raj – Khadgam
  - Ravi Teja – Khadgam

== Superlatives ==
Superlative	Actor	Record
Actor with most awards	Jagapathi Babu, Rana Daggubati, Prakash Raj, P. Sai Kumar	4; 2; 2; 2
Actor with most nominations	Prakash Raj	11
Actor with most nominations without a win	Naresh	4
Actor with most nominations in a single year	Prakash Raj	2 (2002 and 2003)
Oldest winner	Amitabh Bachchan	83 years
Oldest nominee	Akkineni Nageswara Rao	87 years
Youngest winner	Allari Naresh	27 years
Youngest nominee	Shashank	25 years

- Jagapathi Babu holds the record of maximum wins with four awards, followed by Rana Daggubati, Prakash Raj, and Sai Kumar with two awards each.

== See also ==
- Telugu cinema
