= Anthahpuram =

1998 Indian film by Krishna Vamsi

- DVD cover
- Directed by: Krishna Vamsi
- Written by: Krishna Vamsi
- Produced by: P. Kiran
- Starring: Soundarya; Prakash Raj; Sai Kumar; Jagapathi Babu
- Cinematography: S. K. A. Bhupathi
- Edited by: Shankar
- Music by: Ilaiyaraaja
- Production company: Anandi Art Creations
- Release date: 25 December 1998
- Running time: 137 minutes
- Country: India
- Language: Telugu

Anthahpuram (transl. Palace) is a 1998 Indian Telugu-language action thriller film written and directed by Krishna Vamsi. The film stars Soundarya, Prakash Raj, Sai Kumar and Jagapathi Babu with music composed by Ilayaraja. Inspired by the American film Not Without My Daughter (1991), the plot follows an Indian-origin woman from Mauritius who, along with her young son, becomes trapped in her husband's patriarchal and feudal household in the Rayalaseema region of Andhra Pradesh.

Anthahpuram won nine Nandi Awards and three Filmfare Awards South including Best Film – Telugu. The film was partially reshot in Tamil under the same name (1999) with Parthiban replacing Jagapathi Babu and it was remade in Hindi as Shakti: The Power (2002).

== Plot ==
The film begins in Mauritius, where Bhanu, a lively young woman, lives with her uncle Bobby. She meets Prakash, an orphan, and the two marry, soon having a son named Raja. When Prakash learns about a violent incident in his hometown in Rayalaseema, he attempts to contact his mother but is unable to. Distressed, Prakash decides to return to India with Bhanu and Raja. Bhanu soon realises that Prakash has been hiding his familial identity: he is from a powerful feudal family, with his father, Narasimha, being a notorious faction leader. Prakash had left this violent world behind, migrating to Mauritius to escape the brutality.

Upon their arrival, Narasimha's rivals attempt to kill Prakash but are thwarted by Narasimha's loyalists, who rescue the family and take them to their ancestral home. Bhanu is repulsed by the violent and oppressive culture and resists Narasimha's attempts to bond with his grandson. She finds comfort in her kind-hearted mother-in-law, who cares deeply for Bhanu, Prakash, and Raja. Prakash arranges to return to Mauritius and entrusts their passports to his friend, Inspector Chinna, to facilitate the travel.

During a wedding ceremony, Prakash is attacked and killed by Narasimha's enemies. Devastated, Bhanu decides to leave with Raja but agrees to stay until Prakash’s funeral at her mother-in-law's request. Narasimha, seeking an heir to avenge his son's death, refuses to let Bhanu leave with Raja. Bhanu protests and attempts to escape but is confined to the house.

Meanwhile, Sarai Veeraraju, a petty thief dreaming of moving to Dubai, becomes entangled in Bhanu's plight. With her mother-in-law's help, Bhanu escapes and retrieves their passports from Chinna. When pursued by Narasimha's men, she encounters Veeraraju, who agrees to help her in exchange for money to fulfill his ambition of migrating abroad. Veeraraju protects Bhanu and Raja, planning to get them safely onto a train to Hyderabad. In the ensuing chaos, Veeraraju sacrifices his life, enabling Bhanu and Raja to escape.

Narasimha continues to pursue Bhanu to the airport. However, upon catching up to her, he has a change of heart after his wife confronts him about their family's responsibility for the tragedies. Narasimha asks Bhanu for forgiveness allowing her and Raja to leave. The film concludes with Bhanu forgiving Narasimha and Raja bidding an emotional farewell to his grandfather.

== Cast ==
- Soundarya as Bhanumati
- Prakash Raj as Narasimha
- Sai Kumar as Prakash, Bhanumati's husband
- Jagapathi Babu as Sarai Veeraraju
- Saradha as Narasimha's wife
- K. Ashok Kumar
- G. V. Sudhakar Naidu as G.V
- Ramaraju as Narasimha's henchman
- Dasari Arun Kumar in a cameo appearance
- Chinna as Police officer
- M. S. Narayana
- Babu Mohan as Bobby
- Raja Babu
- Jagga Rao
- Telangana Shakuntala as Chinnamma
- Heera Rajagopal as an item number in the song "Chamakku Chamakkule" (guest appearance)
- Delhi Rajeswari
- Master Krishna Pradeep as Raja (Prakash's son)
- Madhusudhan Rao in an uncredited role

Tamil version

- Parthiban as Dubai Pandiyan
- Mansoor Ali Khan as Sekar
- Simran as an item number in the song "Mana Madurai" (guest appearance)

== Production ==
=== Development ===
The concept for Anthahpuram was inspired by the 1991 film Not Without My Daughter, which tells the real-life story of Betty Mahmoody, an American woman married to an Iranian man. Director Krishna Vamsi was deeply affected by the film, which depicted the struggles of a sophisticated woman trapped in a primitive society. He sought to create an Indianised version of the story. Vamsi saw an opportunity when producers Tammareddy Bharadwaja and P. Kiran approached him to make a film.

Vamsi pitched an Indianised version of Not Without My Daughter, set in Mauritius and Rayalaseema. The plot followed an Indian woman from Mauritius who struggles to return home after encountering factional violence in Rayalaseema. Bharadwaja expressed interest in the script, and Vamsi further developed it, ultimately shaping the narrative for Anthahpuram.

=== Casting ===
After completing the script for Anthahpuram, Krishna Vamsi initially intended to cast a new face for the role of Bhanumati, though Bharadwaja preferred Soundarya due to her marketability. Vamsi later recognised Soundarya’s acting talent.

Vamsi also approached Arvind Swamy to play Bhanumati’s husband. While Swamy liked the script, he was hesitant to act in Telugu due to a previous negative experience and his discomfort with the language. He suggested making the film in Tamil, but Vamsi offered to shoot his sequences in Tamil and dub them in Telugu. Swamy declined, feeling it would be unfair to the role. Consequently, Vamsi turned to Jagapathi Babu, who initially declined the role due to having already portrayed similar characters. Jagapathi Babu instead suggested taking on the role of Sarai Veeraraju, originally intended for Ravi Teja. As a result, Sai Kumar and Jagapathi Babu were cast in their respective roles of Bhanumati’s husband and Sarai Veeraraju.

=== Filming ===
The production of Anthahpuram faced financial difficulties due to the failures of Krishna Vamsi’s previous films, Sindhooram (1997) and Chandralekha (1998). The film’s budget was limited, and there were scheduling conflicts with the cast.

The film unit traveled to Mauritius to shoot several songs, including "Kalyanam Kanundi," which was filmed at locations such as Grand Bay Beach and Port Louis. In a unique move for a Telugu film, a helicopter was used for the shooting of another song, with part of the sequence filmed inside a submarine. The song "Chamaku" was shot at Shamshabad temple.

== Music ==
The film's music was composed by Ilayaraja with lyrics written by Sirivennela Seetharama Sastry. The audio soundtrack was released on Melody Makers label.

Telugu
No.	Title	Singer(s)	Length
1.	"Asalem"	Ilaiyaraaja, K. S. Chithra	5:54
2.	"Chamakku Chamakkule"	Mano, Swarnalatha	4:48
3.	"Kalyanam"	K. S. Chithra	5:10
4.	"Sivamethara"	Shankar Mahadevan , Gopika Poornima	5:40
5.	"Suridu Poova"	S. Janaki	4:59
Total length:			27:31

All lyrics are written by Palani Bharathi.

Tamil
No.	Title	Singer(s)	Length
1.	"Azageah Unn"	Ilaiyaraaja, K. S. Chithra	5:54
2.	"Maana Madura"	Mano, Swarnalatha	4:48
3.	"Ammmamma"	Baby Deepika, K. S. Chithra	5:10
4.	"Thai Thaga Thai"	Shankar Mahadevan, Gopika Poornima	5:40
5.	"Poovetham Kanna"	K. S. Chithra	4:59
Total length:			27:31

== Reception ==
Rakesh P of Deccan Herald wrote, "For those movie-buffs who feel drooped after watching mushy romances and maudlin melodramas, Ananthapuram provides a respite. Director Krishna Vamsi, who is known for his technical virtuosity, has shot violence and gore very aesthetically and succeeds in making it a gripping entertainer". D. S. Ramanujam of The Hindu reviewing the Tamil version wrote that Parthiban and Prakash Raj "have contributed handsomely in Duet Cinema's Anthapuram". He added, "It is a taxing role for Soundarya and she fulfils it with complete assurance. Mansur Ali Khan quite fits the part while Sai Kumar cuts a neat figure in the role of a son who wants his father to give up his ways of bloodshed". K. P. S. of Kalki reviewing the same, wrote the old Thevar Magan has been washed anew; blood is used for washing instead of water.

Upon its release, Anthahpuram initially received negative reactions from audiences, who found its violent and intense themes difficult to accept. However, over time, the film gained appreciation and became popular, eventually earning several awards.

== Accolades ==
Award (Note: Awards are in Alphabetical order.)	Date of ceremony (Note: Date is linked to the article about the awards held that year, wherever possible.)	Category	Recipient(s)	Result	Ref.
Filmfare Awards South	24 April 1999	Best Film – Telugu	Anthahpuram	Won	
Filmfare Awards South	24 April 1999	Best Director – Telugu	Krishna Vamsi	Won	
Filmfare Awards South	24 April 1999	Best Actress – Telugu	Soundarya	Won	
Nandi Awards	18 March 1999	Special Jury Award	Soundarya	Won	
Nandi Awards	18 March 1999	Best Supporting Actor	Jagapathi Babu	Won	
Nandi Awards	18 March 1999	Best Character Actor	Prakash Raj	Won	
Nandi Awards	18 March 1999	Best Character Actress	Telangana Shakuntala	Won	
Nandi Awards	18 March 1999	Best Child Actor	Master Krishna Pradeep	Won	
Nandi Awards	18 March 1999	Best Female Playback Singer	S. Janaki for "Suridu Poova"	Won	
Nandi Awards	18 March 1999	Best Art Director	Srinivasa Raju	Won	
Nandi Awards	18 March 1999	Best Costume Designer	Thota Sai	Won	
Nandi Awards	18 March 1999	Best Female Dubbing Artist	Saritha	Won	
National Film Awards	15 February 2000	Special Mention	Prakash Raj	Won	
