= 50th Filmfare Awards South =

Award ceremony for South Indian films

- Date: 24 May 2003
- Site: Gachibowli Indoor Stadium, Hyderabad, Andhra Pradesh, India

Highlights
- Most awards: Kannathil Muthamittal (Tamil), 3 Gemini (Tamil), 3 Khadgam (Telugu), 3 Meesa Madhavan (Malayalam), 3

The 50th Filmfare Awards South ceremony honouring the winners and nominees of the best of South Indian cinema in films released in 2002, was held at the Gachibowli Indoor Stadium, Hyderabad, 24 May 2003.

== Main awards ==
Winners are listed first, highlighted in boldface.

=== Kannada cinema ===
| Best Film | Best Director |
|---|---|
| **Dweepa** | **Girish Kasaravalli – Dweepa** |
| Best Actor | Best Actress |
| **Sudeep – Nandhi** | **Soundarya – Dweepa** |
Best Music Director
**Gurukiran – Dhumm**

=== Malayalam cinema ===
| Best Film | Best Director |
|---|---|
| **Nandanam** | **Lal Jose – Meesa Madhavan** |
| Best Actor | Best Actress |
| **Dileep – Meesa Madhavan** | **Navya Nair – Nandanam** |
Best Music Director
**Vidyasagar – Meesa Madhavan**

=== Tamil cinema ===
| Best Film | Best Director |
|---|---|
| **Azhagi** | **Mani Ratnam – Kannathil Muthamittal** |
| Best Actor | Best Actress |
| **Ajith Kumar – Villain**; R. Madhavan - Kannathil Muthamittal | **Simran – Kannathil Muthamittal** |
| Best Supporting Actor | Best Supporting Actress |
| **Jayaram - Panchathantiram** | **Sneha - Unnai Ninaithu** |
| Best Comedian | Best Villain |
| **Vivek - Run** | **Kalabhavan Mani- Gemini** |
Best Music Director
**Bharadwaj – Gemini**

=== Telugu cinema ===
| Best Film | Best Director |
|---|---|
| **Santhosham**; Jayam; Manmadhudu; Indra | **Krishna Vamsi – Khadgam**; V. V. Vinayak - Aadi; Teja - Jayam; Puri Jagannadh - Idiot |
| Best Actor | Best Actress |
| **Chiranjeevi – Indra**; Jr. NTR - Aadi; Nagarjuna - Santhosham; Uday Kiran - Nee Sneham | **Sadha – Jayam**; Kalyani - Avunu Valliddaru Ishtapaddaru; Shriya Saran - Santhosham; Aarthi Agarwal - Nuvvu Leka Nenu Lenu |
| Best Supporting Actor | Best Supporting Actress |
| **Prakash Raj - Nuvve Nuvve**; Prakash Raj - Khadgam; Ravi Teja - Khadgam; Harikrishna - Lahiri Lahiri Lahirilo | **Sangeeta - Khadgam'**; Bhanupriya - Lahiri Lahiri Lahirilo; Gracy Singh - Santhosham; Anshu - Manmadhudu |
| Best Comedian | Best Villain |
| **Brahmanandam - Manmadhudu**; Kondavalasa Lakshmana Rao - Avunu Valliddaru Ishtapaddaru; Suman Setty - Jayam; Sunil - Nuvvu Leka Nenu Lenu | **Shafi - Khadgam**; Gopichand - Jayam; Rajan P. Dev - Aadi; Mukesh Rishi - Indra |
Best Music Director
**R. P. Patnaik – Santhosham**; R. P. Patnaik – Jayam; Mani Sharma - Indra; Chakri - Avunu Valliddaru Ishtapaddaru; Harris Jayaraj - Vasu

== Technical Awards ==
| Best Choreography: Lawrence – from Indra | Best Cinematography: Ravi K. Chandran – Kannathil Muthamittal |

== Special awards ==
| Lifetime Achievement: K. Raghavendra Rao; Vishnuvardhan | Filmfare Award for Best Male Debut - South: Nithiin - Jayam | Best Female Playback Singer: Anuradha Sriram - Gemini |

== Awards Presentation ==
- Nithiin (Best Debut Award) Received Award from Namitha
- Shafi (Best Villain Award) Received Award from Ravi Teja
- Kalabhavan Mani (Best Villain Award) Received Award from Suriya
- Vivek (Best Comedian Award) Received Award from Kiran Rathod
- Sangeeta (Best Supporting Actress Award) Received Award from Jayanth C. Paranjee
- Sneha (Best Supporting Actress Award) Received Award from Aniruddha Jatkar
- Soundarya (Best Film Kannada) Received Award from D. Ramanaidu
- D Udhaya Kumar(Best Film Tamil) Received Award from Prabhu Deva
- Girish Kasaravalli (Best Director Kannada) Received Award from Uday Kiran
- Krishna Vamsi (Best Director Telugu) Received Award from Sunil Shetty
- Gurukiran (Best Music Director Kannada) Received Award from Sachiin J. Joshi
- Bharadwaj (Best Music Director Tamil) Received Award from Nagendra Babu
- Soundarya (Best Actress Kannada) Received Award from R. Sarathkumar
- Navya Nair (Best Actress Malayalam) Received Award from Khushbu
- Sadha (Best Actress Telugu) Received Award from Venkatesh Daggubati
- Sudeep (Best Actor Kannada) Received Award from Naghma
- Dileep (Best Actor Malayalam) Received Award from Ramya Krishnan
- Chiranjeevi father (Best Actor Telugu) Receive Chiranjeevi Award from K. Raghavendra Rao
- K. Raghavendra Rao (Lifetime Achievement Award) Received Award from Jeetendra and Jaya Prada
- Vishnuvardhan (Lifetime Achievement Award) Received Award from Jeetendra and Jaya Prada

=== General ===
- 50th Manikchand Filmfare Awards
