= Samala Bhasker =

Indian cinematographer and director

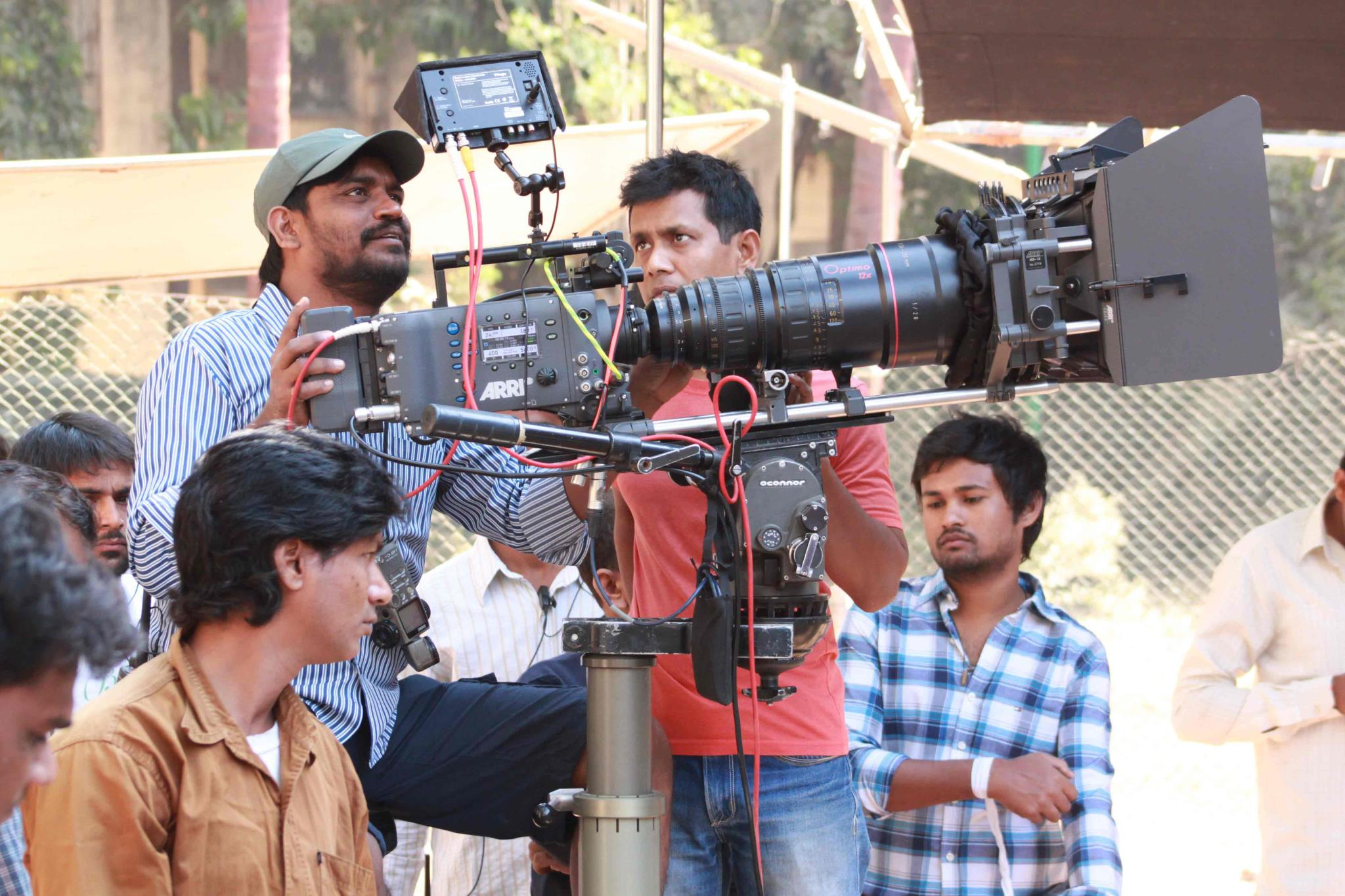
- Born: 8 December 1975 (age 50); Warangal, Telangana, India
- Education: Jawaharlal Nehru Architecture and Fine Arts University
- Occupation: Cinematographer
- Title: TCA
- Spouse: Soujanya (m. 2007)

Samala Bhasker is an Indian cinematographer and director known for his works predominantly in Telugu cinema. He is a postgraduate at the Jawaharlal Nehru Architecture and Fine Arts University, Hyderabad in Photography and Visual communication. His first film as a cinematographer was Sasirekha Parinayam directed by Pasupuleti Krishna Vamsi.

== Early and personal life ==
He was born and brought up in Warangal, Schooling in Singareni Collieries High School, Madaram, His father is a retired employee at Singareni Collieries Company Limited. He is the second of three siblings. He completed his Diploma Mechanical Engineering in 1996. He is postgraduate at the Jawaharlal Nehru Architecture and Fine Arts University, Hyderabad Photography & Visual communication, Hyderabad. He is married to Soujanya on 29 April 2007. His two kids, daughter Aishwarya born in 2008 and Son Amartya born in 2013.

== Career ==
After his graduation from JNTU Photography & Visual Communication, he joined cinematographer Kabir Lal as an assistant from Tujhe Meri Kasam (2003) and The Hero: Love Story of a Spy (2003). Then he joined K. K. Senthil Kumar as a chief associate from Sye (2004), Chatrapathi (2005), Yamadonga (2007) and simultaneously worked with Sandeep Gunnam and his close friend Sarvesh Murari for several films as a 2nd unit DOP. While working Arundhati (2009), he got an opportunity to work for the same film Arundhati as a Cinematographer. Then Krishna Vamsi choose him as the cinematographer in Sasirekha Parinayam.

== Filmography ==
Year	Title	Language
2009	Sasirekha Parinayam	Telugu
2008	Three	Telugu
2012	Ayyare	Telugu
2012	Yedyanchi Jatra	Marathi
2013	Popat	Marathi
2014	Japam	Telugu
2015	Dongaata	Telugu
2015	Columbus	Telugu
2015	Just Gammat	Telugu
2016	Raja Cheyyi Vesthe	Telugu
2018	W/O Ram	Telugu
2019	Mrs.Subbalakshmi	Telugu
2022	Nenevaru	Telugu
2023	Operation Fryday	Telugu
2023	Grandhalayam	Telugu
2023	Vairam	Telugu and Kananda
2025	Karmanye Vadhikaraste	Telugu
2025	Premistunnaa	Telugu
