= Nandi Awards of 1998 =

Indian Telugu film and TV awards ceremony

The Nandi Awards are presented annually in Andhra Pradesh, For Telugu cinema by State government. "Nandi" means "bull", the awards being named after the big granite bull at Lepakshi — a cultural and historical symbol of Andhra Pradesh. Nandi Awards are presented in four categories: Gold, Silver, Bronze, and Copper.

The Nandi awards for the year 1998 were Presented on 18 March 1999 at Lalitha Kala Thoranam, Hyderabad.

== 1998 Nandi Awards Winners List ==
Category	Winner	Film
Best Feature Film	Tholi Prema	Tholi Prema
Second Best Feature Film	Kante Koothurne Kanu	Kante Koothurne Kanu
Third Best Feature Film	Ganesh	Ganesh
Nandi Award for Akkineni Award for best home-viewing feature film	Subbarajugari Kutumbam	Subbarajugari Kutumbam
Sarojini Devi Award for a Film on National Integration	Eswar Alla	Eswar Alla
Best Children's Film		
Best Documentary Film		
Best Actor	Venkatesh Daggubati	Ganesh
Best Actress	Roja	Swarnakka
Best Supporting Actor	Jagapati Babu	Antahpuram
Best Supporting Actress	Vaasuki	Tholi Prema
Best Character Actor	Prakash Raj	Antahpuram
Best Character Actress	Telangana Shakuntala	Antahpuram
Best Villain	Kota Srinivasa Rao	Ganesh
Best Male Comedian	Sudhakar	Snehithulu
Best Female Comedian	Rajitha	Pelli Kanuka
Best Child Actor	Krishna Pradeep	Antahpuram
Best Child Actress	Nithya	Chinni Chinni Aasa
Best Director	Dasari Narayana Rao	Kante Koothurne Kanu
Best First Film of a Director	A. Karunakaran	Tholi Prema
Best Screenplay Writer	A. Karunakaran	Tholi Prema
Best Music Director	Mani Sharma	Choodalani Vundi
Best Male Playback Singer	Vandemataram Srinivas	Sri Ramulayya (Vippa Pula)
Best Female Playback Singer	S. Janaki	Antahpuram (Sooreedu Puvva)
Best Lyricist	Suddala Ashok Teja	Kante Koothurne Kanu
Best Story Writer	Dasari Narayana Rao	Kante Koothurne Kanu
Best Dialogue Writer	Paruchuri Brothers	Ganesh
Best Cinematographer	Jayanan Vincent	Premante Idera
Best Editor	Marthand K. Venkatesh	Tholi Prema
Best Art Director	Srinivasa Raju	Antahpuram
Best Choreographer	Saroj Khan	Choodalani Vundi
Best Male Dubbing Artist	Srinivasa Murthy	Sivayya
Best Female Dubbing Artist	Saritha	Antahpuram
Best Makeup Artist	Raghava	Ganesh
Best Costume Designer	Thota Sai	Antahpuram
Best Audiographer	Madhusudan Reddy	Choodalani Vundi
Nandi Award for Best Book on Telugu Cinema(Books, posters, etc.)	Chimmani Manohar	Cinema Scripts, Rachana Silpam
Best Film Critic on Telugu Cinema	A Prabhu	
Special Jury Award	Soundarya	Antahpuram
Special Jury Award	Ramya Krishnan	Kante Koothurne Kanu
Special Jury Award	Srihari	Sri Ramulayya
