= Sindhooram (1997 film) =

1997 Telugu film by Krishna Vamsi

- DVD cover
- Directed by: Krishna Vamsi
- Written by: Story & Screenplay: Krishna Vamsi; Dialogues: K. N. Y. Patanjali
- Produced by: Mullapudi Mohan
- Starring: Brahmaji; Sanghavi; Ravi Teja; Soundarya
- Cinematography: S. K. A. Bhupathi
- Edited by: Shankar
- Music by: Sri
- Production company: Andhra Talkies
- Release date: 12 September 1997
- Running time: 144 minutes
- Country: India
- Language: Telugu

Sindhooram (transl. Vermilion) is a 1997 Indian Telugu-language crime drama film written and directed by Krishna Vamsi. The film stars Brahmaji and Sanghavi, with Ravi Teja and Soundarya (Geeta) in supporting roles. The film examines the complexities of Naxalism in Andhra Pradesh, focusing on the societal and emotional factors driving educated individuals to join the movement.

Although the film received critical acclaim for its portrayal of a sensitive subject, it was a commercial failure. Sindhooram won the National Film Award for Best Feature Film in Telugu, was screened at the International Film Festival of India, and received five Nandi Awards.

== Plot ==
A group of police constables returning from election duty is ambushed by Naxalites, who blow up their vehicle.

Bulliraju, a trainee police officer with a strong sense of justice, hails from a village near the Godavari River. In the village, his friends Chanti, Bairagi, and Satipandu are wayward youth who spend their time drinking, gambling, and teasing women. Some of them are also informants for the Naxalites operating in the nearby forest. The village is home to various other characters, including landlords, policemen, doctors, farmers, and labourers. Baby, who is in love with Bulliraju, and Lakshmi, who has feelings for Chanti, are among the villagers.

Bulliraju returns home during his training and discovers that the local police serve the interests of the wealthy rather than upholding justice. When Satipandu is accused of being a Naxalite, the police detain and torture him. Bulliraju intervenes but is also taken into custody. During the altercation, the sub-inspector kills Satipandu, and Bulliraju accidentally shoots the officer. Branded as a Naxalite, Bulliraju is forced to flee and eventually becomes the leader of the group, despite lacking any allegiance to Communist or Maoist ideologies. Bulliraju transforms the group into a vigilante force focused on delivering justice to the oppressed rather than propagating political ideology. He gains widespread support, becoming a symbol of law and order for 30 surrounding villages. However, to the police, his actions remain illegal, as his group operates outside the law, challenging the official authority.

Bulliraju's former training officer is tasked with eradicating Naxalism from the area and views Bulliraju as a traitor who infiltrated police training to exploit their methods. The conflict intensifies when the Naxalite leader Bairagi is betrayed and captured by an arms dealer. In response, Bulliraju kidnaps a local minister to negotiate his release. Facing continuous assaults from the police, poisoned water, harsh weather, and dwindling resources, Bulliraju's group suffers heavy losses. The story culminates in a final confrontation between the police and Bulliraju's gang, resulting in numerous casualties on both sides.

The film emphasizes that justice is essential for a stable society. It posits that when justice is systematically denied through official channels, desperate people are compelled to seek it by their own means, inevitably leading to chaos and social unrest.

== Cast ==
- Brahmaji as Bulliraju
- Sanghavi as Baby
- Ravi Teja as Chanti
- Soundarya (Geeta) as Lakshmi
- Narasimha Raju as Gopal Reddy, ex-Naxalite leader
- Bhanu Chander as Training Officer
- Chalapati Rao as Minister
- Paruchuri Venkateswara Rao as Bairagi
- Pruthviraj Balireddy as Naxalite
- Sivaji Raja as Police Constable
- Surya as Chandra, a Naxalite
- Annapoorna as Buliraju's mother
- Ahuti Prasad
- Bandla Ganesh
- Achyuta Rama Rao as Naxalite

== Production ==
Sindhooram was produced and directed by Krishna Vamsi under his banner, Andhra Talkies, with the aim of blending entertainment with social awareness. After the success of his earlier films, producers expected him to make another commercial hit like Ninne Pelladatha or Gulabi. However, Vamsi chose to focus on deeper themes, inspired by the sacrifices of social activists who were often killed while working for societal betterment. The film sought to explore these themes and highlight the lives of individuals who made these sacrifices, which were often overlooked by the public.

Krishna Vamsi drew inspiration from the film Bad Boys and envisioned creating a similar story set in a rural backdrop. He wanted to showcase the beauty of Godavari River while maintaining the region's authenticity. The film focused on the rise of the Naxalite movement and the reasons behind young, educated individuals turning to violence instead of pursuing conventional education. Krishna Vamsi aimed to present the complex realities of these movements, which were often oversimplified or misunderstood.

Motivated by a desire to understand the truth behind the killings of social activists, Krishna Vamsi studied "red films" (erra cinemalu), which he found crude and simplistic in their portrayal of violence. He wanted to offer a more nuanced perspective in Sindhooram. Krishna Vamsi began by depicting the consequences of violence in the film’s opening shot and researched why educated students, such as medical and engineering students, joined the Naxalite movement. His goal was to uncover the untold stories behind their decisions and raise awareness of the sacrifices they made for societal change. Despite advice from industry figures to alter a 20-minute sequence in the second half for broader commercial appeal, Krishna Vamsi stayed true to his original vision.

The casting choices were essential to Krishna Vamsi's vision of breaking away from typecasting. Brahmaji, a long-time acquaintance of Krishna Vamsi, was chosen for his acting ability and suitability for the role. He selected Ravi Teja, who had previously worked as an assistant director on Ninne Pelladata, for his unique traits, such as his imitating skills and energetic persona. Geeta, Y. V. S. Chowdary's wife, starred opposite Ravi Teja. She had previously acted in Ninne Pelladata under the stage name Soundarya.

== Music ==
The music for the film was composed by Sri, with all the lyrics written by Sirivennela Seetharama Sastry, except for the song "Hai Re Hai," which was penned by Chandrabose. The soundtrack received positive reviews.

No.	Title	Singer(s)	Writer(s)	Duration
1.	"Edu Malelethu Sukumariki"	Pradeep, Satyam	Sirivennela Seetharama Sastry	4:48
2.	"Hai Re Hai"	Karthik	Chandrabose	4:48
3.	"Oo Cheli Anarkali"	Suresh Peter	Sirivennela Seetharama Sastry	4:01
4.	"Oo Le Le Oo Le Le"	Vasudevan, Srinivas	Sirivennela Seetharama Sastry	4:34
5.	"Oorike Undadhey"	K. S. Chithra	Sirivennela Seetharama Sastry	5:15
6	"Ardha Satabdapu"	S. P. Balasubrahmanyam	Sirivennela Seetharama Sastry	5:31

== Reception ==
A critic for Andhra Today wrote, "Despite Krishna Vamsi's best efforts to excel at directing this movie with special technical effects to bring out the intensity of the extremist theme, it fails to impress his audience. In the name of realism, the director seems to defend the police encounters for a while, at the same time taking sides with the naxals with equal emphasis ending up in confusing the audience. As a result of all this storyline becomes weak".

== Awards ==
National Film Awards

- National Film Award for Best Feature Film in Telugu - Krishna Vamsi (1997)

Nandi Awards

- Second Best Feature Film - Silver - Krishna Vamsi & Mohan Mullapudi
- Best Dialogue Writer - K. N. Y. Patanjali
- Best Supporting Actor - Surya
- Best Lyricist - Sirivennela Seetharama Sastry
- Best Character Actor - Paruchuri Venkateswara Rao
