= Karmanye Vadhikaraste =

2025 Indian Telugu film by Amardeep Challapalli

- Theatrical release poster
- Directed by: Amardeep Challapalli
- Screenplay by: Amardeep Challapalli
- Story by: Siva Kumar Pelluru
- Produced by: D. S. S. Durga Prasad
- Starring: Brahmaji; Shatru; Mahendran
- Cinematography: Samala Bhasker
- Edited by: Marthand K. Venkatesh
- Music by: Gyani
- Production company: Ushaswini Films
- Distributed by: Ushaswini Release
- Release date: 31 October 2025
- Running time: 119 minutes
- Country: India
- Language: Telugu

Karmanye Vadhikaraste (transl. You have the right to work) is a 2025 Indian Telugu-language action thriller film screenplay and directed by Amardeep Challapalli. It stars Aira Dayanand, Brahmaji, Shatru, and Mahendran in important roles.

The film was released on 31 October 2025. Set against the backdrop of a high-stakes investigation, the story follows a team of law-enforcement officers who uncover an underground network tied to arms trafficking and espionage.

== Plot ==
The film begins by establishing three seemingly unrelated crime narratives in the city.

The first thread follows Prudhvi, who reports a late-night hit-and-run incident. Sub-Inspector Arjun Devineni, a sincere but troubled officer, takes the case, only to find that the victim was already deceased before the collision, hinting at a meticulously covered-up murder.

Simultaneously, the second thread introduces Constable Kireeti, a suspended officer determined to redeem his reputation. He discovers a minor girl who has been brutally assaulted and, against protocol, takes her into his care. Her possessions contain coded information and photos that point toward a massive criminal enterprise involved in arms dealing.

The third thread introduces Jai, a charismatic and manipulative ad filmmaker who uses his profession as a front for dark activities, specifically targeting young women for drug-related abuse and entrapment. As the investigations deepen, both Arjun and Kireeti independently begin to sense that the individual crimes they are pursuing—the staged accident, the assaulted minor, and Jai's predatory behavior—are all interlinked. The clues, initially fragmented, start forming a pattern that reveals a single, massive underground network dealing in human trafficking, espionage, and illegal arms smuggling.

The climax sees the convergence of Arjun and Kireeti's efforts, possibly with the aid of an uncredited NIA operative, Yagna. They realize they are fighting against a powerful, faceless organization with connections spanning political figures and high-ranking officials. The non-linear narrative culminates in a high-stakes confrontation where the investigators, guided by their sense of duty (Karmanye Vadhikaraste), risk everything to dismantle the network, bringing the perpetrators of these interconnected crimes to justice.

== Cast ==
- Brahmaji as Head Constable Kireeti
- Shatru as ACP Arjun Prasad
- Mahendran as Jai
- Banerjee
- Sivaji Raja
- Prudhvi Raj as Prudhvi Raj
- Ajay Rathnam
- Sri Sudha Bhimireddy
- Ira Dayanand as Yagna
- Krishna Bhat
- Ayesha
- Rehana Khan
- Prasad Behara as Gopi
- Madhu Prakash

== Music ==
The soundtrack and background score are composed by Gyani.

== Release and reception ==
Karmanye Vadhikaraste was initially scheduled to release on 19 September 2025 but was later released on 31 October 2025. It was later released on Sun NXT.

Suhas Sistu of The Hans India rated it 3 out of 5 writing, "Karmanye Vadhikaraste stands out for its non-linear storytelling, socially relevant undertones like honey trapping and illegal immigration, and strong character arcs". Sakshi Post rated it 2.5 out of 5 and appreciated the writing.
