= Premistunnaa =

2025 Indian Telugu film by Bhanu Shankar

- Theatrical release poster
- Directed by: Bhanu Shankar
- Written by: Bhanu Shankar
- Produced by: Kanaka Durga Rao Pappula
- Starring: Sathvik Varma; Preethi Neha
- Cinematography: Samala Bhasker
- Edited by: Sirish Prasad
- Music by: Siddharth Salur
- Production company: IBM Production House LLP
- Release date: 7 November 2025
- Country: India
- Language: Telugu

Premistunnaa is a 2025 Indian Telugu-language romantic drama film written and directed by Bhanu Shankar. The film stars Sathvik Varma and Preethi Neha in lead roles.

The film was released on 7 November 2025.

== Cast ==
- Sathvik Varma
- Preethi Neha
- Viji Chandrasekhar as Saradha
- Subbu Panchu as Murali
- Rahul Ravi

== Music ==
The background score and songs were composed by Siddharth Salur.

Track listing
No.	Title	Lyrics	Singer(s)	Length
1.	"Aha Adhemito"	Venigalla Rambabu	Haricharan, Ramya Behara	4:54
2.	"Evare Nuvvu"	Purnachary Challury	Sandilya Pisapati, Tanvi Manjula Ghantasala, Pradhanya Jaligama, Shreyashi Pendyala	4:12
3.	"Arere"	Suddala Ashok Teja	Anurag Kulkarni	4:05

== Release and reception ==
Premistunnaa was released on 7 November 2025.

Ramu Chinthakindhi of Times Now Telugu rated it 3 out of 5 and praised the direction. Bhargav Chaganti of NTV rated the film 2.75 out of 5 and appreciated least cast performances.
