= Legend (2014 film) =

2014 Indian film by Boyapati Srinu

- Theatrical release poster
- Directed by: Boyapati Srinu
- Written by: Story & Screenplay: Boyapati Srinu; Dialogues: M. Rathnam
- Produced by: Ram Achanta; Gopichand Achanta; Anil Sunkara; Sai Korrapati; Renny Johnson
- Starring: Nandamuri Balakrishna; Jagapathi Babu; Sonal Chauhan; Radhika Apte
- Cinematography: C. Ram Prasad
- Edited by: Kotagiri Venkateswara Rao
- Music by: Devi Sri Prasad
- Production companies: 14 Reels Entertainment; Varahi Chalana Chitram
- Release date: 28 March 2014
- Running time: 161 minutes
- Country: India
- Language: Telugu
- Box office: ₹70 crore

Legend is a 2014 Indian Telugu-language action drama film directed by Boyapati Srinu and produced by 14 Reels Entertainment and Varahi Chalana Chitram. The film stars Nandamuri Balakrishna in a dual role, alongside Jagapathi Babu, Sonal Chauhan and Radhika Apte. The music was composed by Devi Sri Prasad, while the cinematography and editing were handled by C. Ram Prasad and Kotagiri Venkateswara Rao.

Legend was released on 28 March 2014 worldwide to positive reviews from critics and became the fourth-highest-grossing Telugu film of 2014, grossing over ₹70 crore worldwide. It became the second film to run for over 1000 days in South India.

== Cast ==
- Nandamuri Balakrishna in double role as Jaidev alias Legend and Krishna Dev
- Jagapathi Babu as Jitendra
- Sonal Chauhan as Sneha; Krishna 's love interest
- Radhika Apte as Radhika; Jaidev’s love interest
- Mahadevan as Jeetendra's father
- Kalyani as Jeetendra's wife
- Suman as Raja Maharaj, Jaidev and Krishna's father
- Sujata Kumar as Jaidev, Krishna and Radhika's grandmother
- Suhasini Maniratnam as Rani, Jaidev and Krishna's mother
- Brahmanandam as Gundu Manikyam
- Jaya Prakash Reddy as MP
- Ajay as Jeetendra's younger brother
- Sravan as Chotu, Jeetendra's elder son
- Kamal Kamaraju as Jeetendra's younger son
- Brahmaji as Yadhav
- Ahuti Prasad as Sneha's father
- Rao Ramesh as Jaidev, Krishna's Uncle and Radhika's father
- Narendra Jha as Union Minister
- G. V. Sudhakar Naidu as Jeetendra's brother-in-law
- Chalapathi Rao as Raghavaiah
- Easwari Rao as Jaidev, Krishna's aunt and Radhika's mother
- Sithara as Jaidev's younger sister
- Sudeepa Pinky as Jaidev, Krishna and Radhika's niece
- Salim Baig as Salaar
- Madhusudhan Rao as SP Veeraiah
- Shatru as Police Officer
- Jeeva as Party Candidate
- Prudhviraj as Party Candidate
- Rajitha as Party Candidate
- Shekar as Simhachalam, Ex - M.L.A.
- Sameer Hasan as Jaidev, Krishna and Radhika's brother-in-law
- Dil Ramesh as Jeetendra's henchmen
- L.B. Sriram as Pydithalli
- Hamsa Nandini as Menaka in item number

== Soundtrack ==
Legend

Soundtrack album by Devi Sri Prasad
- Released: 6 March 2014
- Recorded: 2014
- Genre: Soundtrack
- Length: 23:36
- Label: Lahari Music
- Producer: Devi Sri Prasad

Devi Sri Prasad chronology
Bramman (2014)	Legend (2014)	Alludu Seenu (2014)

Music was composed by Devi Sri Prasad. Lyrics were written by Ramajogayya Sastry. Music was released on Lahari Music company. The music director Devi Sri Prasad, teaming up with Boyapati Srinu for the third time after Bhadra and Tulasi, and scoring for the first time for a Balakrishna film There are six tracks in the album. The music was launched on 6 March 2014 at Shilpakala Vedika in Hyderabad with the film's theatrical trailer.

All lyrics are written by Ramajogayya Sastry.

Track listing
No.	Title	Singer(s)	Length
1.	"Legend"	M. L. R. Karthikeyan	3:00
2.	"Nee Kanti Choopullo"	Vijay Yesudas, K.S. Chithra	4:04
3.	"Tanjavuru"	Sooraj Santhosh, Harini	4:21
4.	"Time Bomb"	Narendra, Rita	4:13
5.	"Om Sarvani"	M. M. Manasi	3:45
6.	"Lasku Tapa"	Sagar, Malathi	4:13
7.	"Needanichhey Godugai Nilichey (Unreleased/Theatrical version)"	M. L. R Karthikeyan (Uncredited)	1:00
Total length:			23:36

== Production ==
=== Casting ===
Bollywood actress Sonal Chauhan was roped as one of the leading actress. Jagapathi Babu was cast as the antagonist in the film. Kalyani paired up with Jagapathi Babu as his wife. Anil Sunkara confirmed that Radhika Apte was the heroine. Hamsa Nandini appeared in a special song with Balakrishna.

=== Filming ===
The muhurtham ceremony of the film was held on 3 June 2013 in Hyderabad. The film was supposed to start its shoot in Dubai, but the production team decided to start off because Some permissions did not come through in time. The regular shooting of the film started in Ramoji Film City on 13 July 2013 at Hyderabad. The introduction scene of the hero was shot under the action choreography of Ram Laxman. A special car chase sequence of the film was shot in the deserts of Dubai and a song was canned on Balakrishna and Sonal Chauhan in this schedule.

== Release ==
Legend was released worldwide on 28 March 2014 and was shown in 700 theaters across the state and over 1200 theaters worldwide.

=== Critical reception ===
Jeevi of Idlebrain.com rated the film three and one-fourth out of five, stating, "Plus points of the film are Bala Krishna’s ferocious performance (as Jai Dev) and powerful dialogues written by M Ratnam. On the flip side, there is a lot of bloodshed. On a whole, Legend is a feast for fans and will be liked by masses." A critic from The Times of India gave the film three out of five stars and wrote, "The music turns out to be a disappointment. It’s just not what do they say…thumping enough. There’s a surfeit of blood, action sequences and deafening punch dialogues. Simply put its Simha remade with bad music. How much you will enjoy it will be directly proportional to your love for Balayya."

=== Box office ===
Legend ran for 100 days in 31 centres and 175 days in 2 centres. The film completed 200 days run in two centres (Yemmiganur -Direct (Kurnool district), Proddutur(Kadapa District) -Single Shift). The film also completed 275 days run in 2 centers: Yemmiganur -Direct (Kurnool district), Proddutur (Kadapa District – Single Shift). After Muddula Mavayya, Samarasimha Reddy, Narasimha Naidu and Simha 5th film to complete double century.

The film completed 365 days run in two theatres in Kurnool district with direct four shows and it also completed 1000 days in Proddutur (56 days in Arveti theatre and 944 days (single shift 4 shows) at Archana theatre).

=== Accolades ===
Year	Ceremony	Category	Nominee	Result
2015	GAMA Awards 2014	Best Background score	Devi Sri Prasad	Won
2015	GAMA Awards 2014	Best Title Song	Devi Sri Prasad	Won
2015	62nd Filmfare Awards South	Best Supporting Actor	Jagapathi Babu	Won
2015	TSR – TV9 National Film Awards	Best Director	Boyapati Srinu	Won
2015	TSR – TV9 National Film Awards	Best Actor	Nandamuri Bala Krishna	Won
2015	TSR – TV9 National Film Awards	Best Villain	Jagapathi Babu	Won
2015	4th South Indian International Movie Awards	Best Film (Telugu)		Nominated
2015	4th South Indian International Movie Awards	Best Director (Telugu)	Boyapati Srinu	Nominated
2015	4th South Indian International Movie Awards	Best Actor (Telugu)	Nandamuri Bala Krishna	Won
2015	4th South Indian International Movie Awards	Best Supporting Actor (Telugu)	Sujatha Kumar	Nominated
2015	4th South Indian International Movie Awards	Best Actor in a Negative Role (Telugu)	Jagapathi Babu	Won
2015	4th South Indian International Movie Awards	Best Fight Choreographer	Ram-Laxman and Kanal Kannan	Nominated
2015	4th South Indian International Movie Awards	Best Lyricist (Telugu)	Ramajogayya Sastry – Nee Kanti Choopullo	Nominated
2016	Nandi Awards of 2014	Best Feature Film (Gold)	Sai Korrapati, Ram Achanta, Gopi Achanta, Anil Sunkara	Won
2016	Nandi Awards of 2014	Best Actor	Balakrishna	Won
2016	Nandi Awards of 2014	Best Villain	Jagapathi Babu	Won
2016	Nandi Awards of 2014	Best Director	Boyapati Srinu	Won
2016	Nandi Awards of 2014	Best Male Playback Singer	Vijay Yesudas	Won
2016	Nandi Awards of 2014	Best Dialogue Writer	M. Rathnam	Won
2016	Nandi Awards of 2014	Best Editor	Kotagiri Venkateswara Rao	Won
2016	Nandi Awards of 2014	Best Fight Master	Ram Lakshman	Won
2015	13th Santosham Film Awards	Best Cinematographer	Ram Prasad	Won
2015	13th Santosham Film Awards	Best Action	Ram Laxman	Won
