= Hey Sarasu =

Indian Kannada-language comedy film

- Directed by: B Ramamurthy
- Written by: B Ramamurthy (dialogue)
- Screenplay by: B Ramamurthy
- Based on: Chandralekha (1997) by Priyadarshan
- Produced by: A Ganesh; Umesh Banakar
- Starring: Ramesh Aravind; Saritha Jain; Ashwini
- Cinematography: Ramu
- Edited by: Narahalli Jnanesh
- Music by: G R Shankar
- Production company: Om Sri Chamundeshwari Films
- Release date: 7 August 2016
- Country: India
- Language: Kannada

Hey Sarasu is a 2016 Indian Kannada-language comedy film directed by B Ramamurthy and starring Ramesh Aravind, Saritha Jain and Ashwini. The film is a remake of the Malayalam film Chandralekha (1997) by Priyadarshan. The film was released after a seven year delay.

== Cast ==
- Ramesh Aravind as Seetharama Rao
- Saritha Jain
- Ashwini
- Shivaram
- Jai Jagadish as Varma
- Chidanand
- Shivadhwaj
- Sathyajith as Rajesh
- Joe Simon
- Aravind
- Priyanka
- Ashalatha
- Sharanya as Seetharama Rao's sister

== Production ==
The film was director B Ramamurthy's 50th film. Shooting for the film was finished by July 2009.

== Soundtrack ==
Hey Sarasu

Soundtrack album by G R Shankar
- Released: 2009
- Genre: Feature film soundtrack
- Length: 19:50
- Language: Kannada
- Label: Anand Audio

G R Shankar chronology
Mr. Painter (2009)	Hey Sarasu (2009)

The music was composed by G R Shankar. The audio rights were purchased by Anand Audio. KCN Chandrashekar, the former president of the Kannada Film Producers Association, attended the audio launch in 2009 as the chief guest alongside Anand Chabria of Anand Audio.

Track listing
No.	Title	Lyrics	Singer(s)	Length
1.	"Laka Laka Laka Laka"	V. Manohar	Anuradha Bhat, Akanksha Badami	4:43
2.	"Preethi Maade Nannanne"	Hemanth Das	Rajesh Krishnan, Nanditha	5:03
3.	"Notige Notu"	Hrudaya Shiva	Ajay Warier	4:33
4.	"Preethiyiondu Bharavase"	K. Kalyan	Rajesh Krishnan	5:31
Total length:				19:50

== Release ==
The film remained unreleased in 2010. The film did not have a theatrical release and opted for a direct television premiere on Udaya Movies on 7 August 2016 at 9:30 a.m.
