= Sasirekha Parinayam (film) =

- Film poster
- Directed by: Krishna Vamsi
- Written by: Krishna Vamsi
- Produced by: Sunkara Madhumurali
- Starring: Tarun; Genelia
- Cinematography: Samalabhasker
- Edited by: Shankar
- Music by: Mani Sharma; Vidyasagar
- Release date: 1 January 2009
- Running time: 162 minutes
- Country: India
- Language: Telugu

Sasirekha Parinayam is a 2009 Indian Telugu-language romantic drama film directed by Krishna Vamsi and produced by Sunkara Madhumurali. The film stars Tarun and Genelia. The film has been dubbed in Hindi as Bhagam Bhag Love and into Tamil as Sasirekhavin Kalyanam.

== Plot ==
An independent and spirited woman, Sasirekha (Genelia) is ordered by her father to marry an NRI. She is to see a video of the groom and his house, but stamps on it, declaring she doesn't want to get married. When the groom's father demands dowry on the wedding day, she runs away from her marriage. Soon after, she runs into Anand (Tarun). They bond well during their acquaintance and the rest of the movie is about how she falls in love with Anand. As it turns out, Anand is Abhimanyu, the one she was supposed to marry, but due to dowry disputes with his dad, the wedding party leaves without him.

Sasi tries reaching her friend in Hyderabad while escaping her relatives and finding her stolen ornaments with the help of Anand aka Abhimanyu who is deeply in love with her. On reaching Hyderabad after many adventurous events, Sasi get hit by a glass bottle during a strike. A completely teary Abhimanyu takes her to the hospital in auto and Sasi declares her love for him on the way. The climax has Sasi's family and Abhimanyu's family in the hospital where Abhimanyu makes them realise their mistakes and Sasi realises that Anand is indeed Abhimanyu. She gets very happy on knowing this and they get married and all ends well.

== Cast ==
- Genelia as Akula Veera Venkata Naga Sathya Sai Sasirekha aka Sasi / (Bujjamma) (voice dubbed by Savitha Reddy)
- Tarun as Anand / Abhimanyu
- Ahuti Prasad as Akula Thathabbai, Sasirekha's father
- Gopala Krishna as Chalasani Gopala Krishna
- Raghu Babu as Abbulu
- M. S. Narayana as A. Koti
- Noel Sean
- Subbaraju as Aranam, Sasirekha's uncle
- Suthivelu as Thathabbai's father-in-law
- Sivaji Raja
- Surekha Vani
- Geetha Singh
- Tulasi as Sasirekha's mother
- Abhishek as Chalasani Gopala Krishna's son
- Vamshi Paidithalli
- Prudhvi Raj as Truck driver
- Ananth Babu as Hotel Receptionist
- Jogi Krishnam Raju as thief
- Goparaju Ramana as police inspector

== Soundtrack ==
Sasirekha Parinayam

Soundtrack album by: Mani Sharma; VidyaSagar
- Released: 22 December 2008
- Recorded: 2008
- Genre: Feature film soundtrack
- Length: 29:21
- Language: Telugu
- Label: Aditya Music
- Producer: Mani Sharma; VidyaSagar

Mani Sharma chronology
| Souryam (2008) | Sasirekha Parinayam (2008) | Evaraina Epudaina (2009) |

VidyaSagar chronology
| Abhiyum Naanum (2008) | Sasirekha Parinayam (2009) | 1977 (2009) |

The music and background score was composed by Mani Sharma with the lyrics penned by Sirivennela Seetharama Sastry and Ananta Sriram. Music director Vidyasagar composed two songs in the album ("Yedo Yedo" and "Bujjamma").

| No. | Title | Lyrics | Music | Singer(s) | Length |
|---|---|---|---|---|---|
| 1. | "Elaa Entha Sepu" | Sirivennela Seetharama Sastry | Mani Sharma | Rahul Nambiar | 5:09 |
| 2. | "Gundello Golisoda" | Ananta Sriram | Mani Sharma | Jai Srinivas | 4:44 |
| 3. | "O Bujjamma" | Ananta Sriram | Vidyasagar | Ranjith | 4:46 |
| 4. | "Yedho Yedho" | Sirivennela Seetharama Sastry | Vidyasagar | Saindhavi | 2:57 |
| 5. | "Bejawada" | Ananta Sriram | Mani Sharma | Naveen Madhav, Rita Thyagarajan | 5:23 |
| 6. | "Yedho Yedho II" | Sirivennela Seetharama Sastry | Mani Sharma | Saindhavi | 3:14 |
| 7. | "Ninne Ninne" | Sirivennela Seetharama Sastry | Mani Sharma | K. S. Chitra | 4:28 |
| Total length: | | | | | 29:21 |

== Reception ==
A critic from Idlebrain.com wrote that "The initial half of the second half is boring (a common problem with journey flicks if they do not have conflict point). The director makes it up in the last half an hour". A critic from 123telugu wrote that "Watch it, simply because there are few better movies running today. The first half is adequate. The second half promises to be brilliant and except for the last half hour does not deliver on that promise. Watch it only for Genelia".
