= Brahmaji =

Indian film actor

- Brahmaji actor 2026
- Born: 25 April 1965 (age 61); Samarlakota, Andhra Pradesh, India
- Occupation: Actor
- Years active: 1986–present

Brahmaji (born 25 April 1965) is an Indian actor who works in Telugu cinema. He is a regular actor in director Krishna Vamsi's films. Brahmaji appeared in an important role in Krishna Vamsi's debut film as a director, Gulabi.

He appeared in Krishna Vamsi's second film Ninne Pelladata. Krishna Vamsi made him a lead in Sindhooram. Later Brahmaji continued as a character artist. He appeared in lead roles in films such as Samakka Sarakka, Inspector, Kaki, Idea, Andariki Vandanalu, Adhyakshaa, Dhoom Dham, Abbo Vaada, Kumbakonam, and N.H-5. He received 'Santosham Allu Ramalingaiah Smarakam Award' at 16th Santosham Film Awards in 2018 for his comic roles in various Telugu films.

== Early life ==
During Brahmaji's college days, he was a big fan of superstar Krishna. Brahmaji's father used to work as a Tahsildar in Nellore, when J. V. Somayajulu a renowned stage actor, who was also a Deputy Collector, acted in the Telugu classic film Sankarabharanam (1980).

== Filmography ==
=== Telugu ===
List of Telugu films and roles
Year	Title	Role	Ref.
1986	Mannemlo Monagadu		
1987	Muvva Gopaludu		
1989	Muddula Mavayya	Drunkard	
1989	Shiva	Bhavani's henchman	
1990	Magaadu	Ramana Babu	
1990	Doctor Bhavani		
1990	Muddula Menalludu		
1991	Jaitra Yatra		
1991	Sarpayagam		
1992	Lathi	Brahmaji	
1992	Dharma Kshetram	Sambhu Prasad	
1992	Mother India	Suribabu	
1993	Rakshana		Uncredited role
1994	Theerpu		
1994	Jailor Gari Abbayi		
1994	Raithu Bharatam		
1994	Money Money		
1995	Gulabi	Rambabu	
1995	Sankalpam		
1996	Ninne Pelladata	Sivaji	
1997	Sindhooram	Bulliraju	
1998	Chandralekha	Tirupathi	
1998	Sri Ramulayya		
1998	Pelli Peetalu		
1998	Choodalani Vundi	Surya	
1999	English Pellam East Godavari Mogudu	Venkat	
1999	Swayamvaram	Bose	
1999	Nee Kosam		
1999	Sambayya		
1999	Seenu	Vikram	
1999	Seetharama Raju	Chandu	
2000	Sammakka Sarakka		
2000	Vamsoddarakudu	Anand	
2000	Thilaadanam		
2000	Maa Annayya		
2000	Pelli Sambandham		
2001	Ide Naa Modati Prema Lekha	Anjali's brother	
2001	Adhipathi	Yogi's friend	
2001	Chiranjeevulu	Giri	
2002	Tiladaanam	Raghuram	
2002	Khadgam	Captain	
2002	Vasu	ACP Subramanyam	
2002	Tappu Chesi Pappu Koodu		
2002	Joruga Husharuga	Kanchana's brother-in-law	
2003	Nijam	C.I.	
2003	Sivamani	Dattu's henchman	
2003	Inspector	Ravi	
2004	Samba	Pasupathi's brother	
2005	Bhadra	Basava	
2005	Athadu	Nagasamudram Bujji	
2006	Annavaram	Sairam	
2006	Pournami	Nagendra's son	
2007	Munna	Purushottam	
2007	Dhee	Shankar's right hand	
2008	Andariki Vandanalu		
2008	Idi Sangathi		
2008	Kantri	Paidthalli	
2008	Bujjigadu	Brahmaji	
2008	Homam	S.P. Nayak	
2008	Deepavali	Encounter Specialist	
2009	Ek Niranjan	Brahmaji	
2009	Sweet Heart	Ishwar	
2009	Anjaneyulu	Deva	
2010	Maryada Ramanna	Srikanth	
2010	Don Seenu	Bobby	
2010	Brindavanam	Bhoomi's uncle	
2010	Komaram Puli	Raj Kumar	
2011	Mirapakaya	Gupta	
2011	Dookudu	Prakasam	
2011	Kandireega		
2011	Kshetram	S.P.	
2012	Businessman	Bujji	
2012	Julayi	Travel Murthy	
2012	All the Best	Machiraju	
2012	Daruvu		
2012	Nippu	Raja Goud's henchman	
2012	Damarukam	Vishwanadham's brother	
2013	Gouravam	Rambabu	
2013	Baadshah	Rama Krishna	
2013	Balupu	Suri	
2013	Kamina	Kailash	
2013	Attarintiki Daredi	Rajashekhar's brother	
2013	Venkatadri Express	Brahmaji	
2014	Legend	Yadhav	
2014	Ulavucharu Biriyani	Krishna	
2014	Rabhasa	Damodar	
2014	Aagadu	Constable Chandra Sekhar	
2014	Power	Venkat	
2014	Dikkulu Choodaku Ramayya	Sathyam	
2015	Jil	Ranganath	
2015	Pandaga Chesko	Bhupathi's brother	
2015	Rudhramadevi		
2015	Bruce Lee - The Fighter	'Blockbuster' Brahmaji	
2015	Bengal Tiger	Samba's assistant	
2016	Express Raja	Bill Gates	
2016	Run	SI Padmavathi	
2016	Soggade Chinni Nayana	Ramu's cousin	
2016	Krishna Gaadi Veera Prema Gaadha	Veerendra	
2016	Sardaar Gabbar Singh	Raja Manikyam	
2016	Babu Bangaram	C.I.	
2016	Janatha Garage	Shankar	
2016	Manamantha	Police Inspector in Kacheguda	
2016	Hyper	Bhanumathi's Boss	
2016	Premam	Coach	
2016	Traap	Radha	
2017	Keshava	Bheemeshwar	
2017	Radha	Rahim	
2017	LIE	Narada	
2017	Nakshatram	Gopaldas	
2017	Jai Lava Kusa	Rambabu	
2017	Next Nuvve	Sarath	
2017	Oxygen	Ganapathi	
2018	Rangasthalam	Tehsildar	
2018	Kirrak Party	Pandu / Mechanic	
2018	Krishnarjuna Yuddham	Brahmaji	
2018	Bharat Ane Nenu	Bhaskar	
2018	Nela Ticket	Home Secretary	
2018	Saakshyam	Soundarya's brother-in-law	
2018	Aravinda Sametha Veera Raghava	Marappa	
2018	Savyasachi	Police Chief	
2018	Bluff Master	Guru Bhai	
2019	F2 – Fun and Frustration	Dr. Albert Narayan Das	
2019	Where Is the Venkatalakshmi	Suryam	
2019	Chitralahari	Janardhan	
2019	Jersey	Raju	
2019	Maharshi	Pooja's manager	
2019	Voter	Madhava Rao	
2019	Ranarangam	Home Minister	
2019	Gaddalakonda Ganesh	Muni Manikyam	
2019	Raju Gari Gadhi 3	Doctor	
2019	Sye Raa Narasimha Reddy	Vadde Obanna	
2019	Mathu Vadalara	Banerjee	
2020	Ala Vaikunthapurramloo	Sudharshanam	
2020	Sarileru Neekevvaru	Mrudanga Rao	
2020	Bheeshma	JP	
2020	HIT: The First Case	Shinde	
2020	O Pitta Katha	Ajay Kumar	
2020	Eureka	Professor Adi Narayana	
2021	Alludu Adhurs	Brahmaji	
2021	FCUK: Father Chitti Umaa Kaarthik	Fhani's friend	
2021	Ninnila Ninnila	Doctor	
2021	Rang De	Travel Agent Sarvesh	
2021	Narappa	Munappa	
2021	Jathi Ratnalu	Minister Ramachandra	
2021	Ek Mini Katha	Ram Mohan	
2021	Thimmarusu: Assignment Vali	Sudhakar	
2021	Pushpa: The Rise	Sub-Inspector Kupparaj	
2022	Hero	Actor	
2022	DJ Tillu	Inspector Rao	
2022	Clap	District Sports Officer	
2022	Blood Mary	Shekar Babu	
2022	Ghani	Sports federation member	
2022	Sarkaru Vaari Paata	Bank Employee Brahmaji	
2022	Godse	Special Officer	
2022	The Warriorr	Devaraj	
2022	Krishna Vrinda Vihari	Krishna's brother-in-law	
2022	Godfather	Narasimha Reddy	
2022	Kerosene		
2022	Bimbisara	Brahmakamalam	
2022	Like, Share & Subscribe	Brahmanna	Nominated–SIIMA Award for Best Comedian – Telugu
2022	Macherla Niyojakavargam	MRO Narayana	
2022	Top Gear	Brahmaji	
2022	18 Pages	Mojo	
2023	Virupaksha	RMP Doctor	
2023	Amigos	Siddharth's uncle	
2023	Rangabali	Pukaar	
2023	Slum Dog Husband	Lawyer Salman Khan	
2023	Nireekshana	Police Officer	
2023	Mr. Pregnant	Buttabomma	
2023	Bhagavanth Kesari	Deputy CM's personal assistant	
2023	Spark Life	Cop	
2023	Jorugaa Husharugaa	Church father	
2023	Salaar: Part 1 – Ceasefire	Vaali	
2024	Guntur Kaaram	CI Aadhinarayana	
2024	Chaari 111	Srinivas	
2024	Tillu Square	Inspector Rao	
2024	Purushothamudu	Lawyer	
2024	Shivam Bhaje	Doctor	
2024	Alanaati Ramchandrudu	Major Subhash Reddy	
2024	Pushpa 2: The Rule	Sub-Inspector Kupparaj	
2025	Baapu	Mallanna	
2025	Jack	Afshan's father	
2025	Akkada Ammayi Ikkada Abbayi	Pan India Prabhakar	
2025	Kannappa	Gavvaraju	
2025	Karmanye Vadhikaraste	Kireeti	
2025	Paanch Minar	Koteswara Rao	
2026	Om Shanti Shanti Shantihi	Pulasa Ramarao	
2026	Vishnu Vinyasam	Pankaj	
2026	Raakaasa	Parasuram	
2026	Biker	Mahesh	
2026	Bad Boy Karthik	Arilova Seenu	
2026	Lenin	Damodaram	
2026	Srinivasa Mangapuram		

=== Tamil ===
List of Tamil films and roles
Year	Film	Role
2003	Joot	M. Prakasam IPS
2006	Saravana	Soundarapandiyan's assistant
2006	Chennai Kadhal	Sardar
2013	Gouravam	Palani
2016	Saagasam	"Travels" Murthy
2022	Clap	District Sports Officer
2022	The Warriorr	Devaraj

=== Other language films ===
List of other language films and roles
Year	Film	Role	Language
1990	Shiva	Kanta Prasad's Driver	Hindi
2001	Vande Matharam	Citizen rights council member	Kannada
