= Chandralekha (1998 film) =

1998 Telugu film by Krishna Vamsi

- Theatrical release poster
- Directed by: Krishna Vamsi
- Written by: Story: Priyadarshan; Sreenivasan; Screenplay: Krishna Vamsi; Dialogues: Y. Venkatram; Chittajalu Lakshmipati
- Based on: Chandralekha (1997) by Priyadarshan
- Produced by: Nagarjuna Akkineni; V. Ram Prasad
- Starring: Nagarjuna Akkineni; Ramya Krishna; Isha Koppikar
- Cinematography: Ajayan Vincent
- Edited by: Shankar
- Music by: Sandeep Chowtha
- Production company: Great India Entertainments
- Release date: 30 July 1998
- Running time: 151 minutes
- Country: India
- Language: Telugu

Chandralekha is a 1998 Indian Telugu-language comedy drama film co-written and directed by Krishna Vamsi. It stars Nagarjuna, Ramya Krishna and debutant Isha Koppikar, with music composed by Sandeep Chowta. The film was produced by Nagarjuna and V. Ram Prasad under Great India Enterprises banner.

It is a remake of the 1997 Malayalam film Chandralekha directed by Priyadarshan. It is the second combination of Nagarjuna, Krishna Vamsi, and Sandeep Chowta after Ninne Pelladata (1996). Hindi actor Sanjay Dutt made a special appearance for the first time in a Telugu film.

== Plot ==
Sitarama Rao alias Seeta is a struggling unemployed youth who arrives in Hyderabad to meet his sister (Jhansi) and brother-in-law. His father has been falsely implicated in a bank fraud and wants to urgently sell his ancestral property to pay for the litigation, for that Seeta needs his sister's approval, but is rebuked and banished by his brother-in-law. Disillusioned, Seeta seeks out his old schoolmate Tirupathi, who works in a fruit juice vending shop in Hyderabad. Tirupathi himself is a hapless uneducated youth working for his uncle, who is a treacherous money lender, with a hope to marry his daughter Bangari. They plan to open a cool drink shop, but need 1.25 lakh Rupees to rent a shop as a prerequisite to getting a bank loan. With no other way in sight, the two of them swindle Tirupathi's uncle out of 1.25 lakh Rupees. Seeta then tries to get the loan sanctioned, but he is rebuffed by a new bank manager, who had taken charge by then.

In a new development, Seeta happens to rescue a woman called Chandrika Varma or 'Chandra' after a car accident, hospitalizing her. Chandra is the daughter of a wealthy businessman Varma. Seetarama Rao is mistaken by the hospital staff to be her husband Raj Kapoor. Soon her relatives including her father arrive and they too mistake him as Raj Kapoor because no one had ever seen or talked to him. Also, it happened that Chandra was a major client of Seetarama Rao's bank manager, who too mistook him for Chandra's husband, and was now eager to please him. Seetarama Rao, who is good at heart, initially intended to reveal the truth to everyone but later decides to masquerade as Raj Kapoor till he receives loan approval from the bank manager. Chandra lay bedridden, paralyzed, unable to react but was able to witness all the commotion around her.

Some of the relatives of Chandra were never convinced about Seetarama Rao from the outset. To make matters worse for Seeta, enters Lekha, a medical graduate and close friend of Chandra. She had talked to Raj Kapoor on the phone previously and became immediately suspicious about Seeta. The relatives join with Lekha to find out the truth. Lekha and others play cat and mouse with Seeta trying to uncover his veracity, with Seeta staying ahead of the game for a while. Finally, Lekha fortuitously discovers the truth about Seetarama Rao, but she is moved by his life struggles. In the meantime, Chandra revives from her paralysis, but she too forgives Seetarama Rao for everything; also, she had developed a liking for him. But one of the jealous relatives of Chandra manages to expose Seeta before everyone. Then Chandra tell the truth to everyone. She was not in fact in a car accident, but it was a suicide attempt after her fiancé, the real Raj Kapoor, had betrayed her, and their marriage had never commenced. But she was now in love with Seetarama Rao and hoped to marry him. Chandra recovers fully under the loving care of Seeta and Lekha. But later Chandra discovers that Lekha was already in love with Seetarama Rao and had in fact given way for her as a favor to Chandra's father, to whom Lekha was like a second daughter. Chandra gracefully withdraws from her planned marriage with Seetarama Rao. Finally, Seeta and Lekha are united together with everyone's hearty blessings.

== Cast ==
- Nagarjuna Akkineni as Sitarama Rao "Seeta" / Raj Kapoor
- Ramya Krishna as Chandra / Chandrika Varma
- Isha Koppikar as Lekha (Voice dubbed by S.P. Sailaja)
- Murali Mohan as Varma
- Giri Babu as Doctor
- Chandra Mohan as Pandu
- Tanikella Bharani as Prasad, Sitarama Rao's brother-in-law
- Jhansi as Prasad's wife
- Rallapalli as Appalaraju
- M. S. Narayana as Bank Manager
- Brahmaji as Tirupathi
- Banerjee as Varma's relative
- Prudhviraj as Ramaraju
- Uttej as Patient
- Chitti as Varma's relative
- Junior Relangi as House Owner
- Narsing Yadav as Financer
- Rama Prabha as Bamma
- Malika as Varma's relative
- Priya as Bangari
- Sivaji Raja as Hospital compounder
- Sanjay Dutt as Raj Kapoor (cameo appearance)
- Srikanth as himself (cameo appearance)
- KS Ankith as himself

== Production ==
Krishna Vamsi was skeptical about directing a remake, but was convinced later, after watching the Malayalam version. Tabu was reported to play Sukanya's role from the original but was replaced by Ramya Krishna. Sanjay Dutt played a guest role in the film, but was never paid for the role.

== Soundtrack ==
Chandralekha

Soundtrack album by Sandeep Chowta
- Released: 1998
- Genre: Soundtrack
- Length: 27:42
- Label: Aditya Music

The music was composed by Sandeep Chowta. Lyrics were written by Sirivennela Sitarama Sastry. Music was released on Aditya Music.

No.	Title	Singer(s)	Length
1.	"Sahasame Cheyara"	S. P. Balasubrahmanyam	4:31
2.	"Divvi Divvi Divvitam"	Sowmya Raoh, Sujatha	4:25
3.	"Okkasari Okkasari"	Srinivasa Chakravarthi	4:38
4.	"Tajmahaluni"	Rajesh Krishnan, Sowmya Raoh	4:50
5.	"Mogali Podalu"	Rajesh Krishnan, Sujatha	4:32
6.	"Urumulu Nee Muvvalayi"	Rajesh Krishnan, Sujatha	4:32
Total length:			27:42

== Reception ==
The film received a positive review from Zamin Ryot for Nagarjuna's acting and Krishna Vamsi's screenplay and direction.
