= Jayam (2002 film) =

Telugu-language romantic action drama film

- Poster
- Directed by: Teja
- Written by: Teja
- Produced by: Teja
- Starring: Nithiin; Sadha; Gopichand
- Cinematography: Sameer Reddy
- Edited by: Shankar
- Music by: R. P. Patnaik
- Production company: Chitram Movies
- Release date: 14 June 2002
- Running time: 152 minutes
- Country: India
- Language: Telugu
- Budget: ₹1.8 crore
- Box office: est. ₹32 crore

Jayam (transl. Victory) is a 2002 Indian Telugu-language romantic action drama film written, produced and directed by Teja under the banner Chitram Movies. The film stars Nithiin, Sadha, and Gopichand in the lead roles, marking the acting debut of Nithiin and Sadha. The music was composed by R. P. Patnaik.

The film received positive reviews from critics, with praise for the performances and music, and emerged as a commercial blockbuster. It was remade in Tamil in 2003 under the same title by Mohan Raja, starring Ravi Mohan in his debut as a lead actor, earning him the moniker "Jayam Ravi," with Sadha and Gopichand reprising their roles.

== Plot ==
Venkataramana alias "Venkat" is from a poor family who meets Sujatha at his college and falls in love with her. After many meetings, Sujatha too reciprocates Venkat's feelings. However, Sujatha's father learns about this from an astrologer where he fixes Sujatha's marriage with her cousin Raghu, a womanizer and rogue. Raghu falls in love with Sujatha at first sight, where he warns her to never fall for or marry anyone else. After her engagement, Sujatha meets Venkat at the temple, where Raghu also arrives with his gang and thrashes Venkat. Despite this, Venkat gets determined and warns Raghu that he and Sujatha will get married and will take Sujatha at 7:00 am. Enraged, Raghu tells the family to solemnize the marriage. Sujatha goes into her room to change, but she is actually waiting for Venkat after learning about his message. Venkat and Sujatha escape before Raghu arrives to marry her. After an intense chase, Venkat and Sujatha are cornered by Raghu and his men in the forest. Venkat and Raghu challenge each other in an intense hand-to-hand combat, where Venkat finally defeats Raghu. With Sujatha's father's approval, Venkat and Sujatha get married.

== Cast ==
- Nithiin as Venkataramana "Venkat" (Voice-over by Sivaji)
- Sadha as Sujatha, Venkat's love interest (Voice-over by Sunitha)
- Gopichand as Raghu
- Delhi Rajeswari as Sujatha's mother
- Siva Krishna as Sujatha's father
- Prasad Babu as Raghu's father
- Dilip Kumar Salvadi as teenage Raghu
- Dharmavarapu Subramanyam
- Chittajalu Lakshmipati
- Suman Setty as Ali Baba
- Supreeth
- Rallapalli as a priest
- Duvvasi Mohan
- Satti Babu
- Jenny
- Shakeela as Gnana Saraswathi
- Srilakshmi as a nurse
- Alapati Lakshmi
- Nirmala Reddy

== Soundtrack ==
Jayam

Film score by R. P. Patnaik
- Released: 2002
- Genre: Soundtrack
- Length: 42:05
- Label: Aditya Music
- Producer: R. P. Patnaik

R. P. Patnaik chronology
Santosham (2002)	Jayam (2002)	Sreeram (2002)

The music was composed by R. P. Patnaik, while the lyrics were penned by Kulasekhar. The musical rights of the film was released on Aditya Music. The chorus of the song was recreated in the song "Ra Ra Reddy I'm Ready" from Macherla Niyojakavargam (2021).

No.	Title	Singer(s)	Length
1.	"Veeri Veeri"	R. P. Patnaik, Chorus	3:32
2.	"Bandi Bandi"	Ravi Varma, Balaji, R. P. Patnaik, Chorus	5:35
3.	"Enduko" (Male)	R.P. Patnaik	4:52
4.	"Nestama"	R. P. Patnaik, Usha	1:24
5.	"Priyatama"	R. P. Patnaik, Usha	5:02
6.	"Gorantha Deepam"	R. P. Patnaik, Gayatri	1:01
7.	"Evvaru Emanna"	R. P. Patnaik, Usha	4:05
8.	"Enduko" (Female)	Usha	4:49
9.	"Raanu Raanu"	Teja, Usha, R. P. Patnaik	4:48
10.	"Prema O Prema"	K.K.	3:25
11.	"Dushkaram"	Chorus	1:09
12.	"Jayam"	Chorus	1:51
Total length:			42:05

== Reception ==
Jayam received very mixed reviews from critics with praise towards the cast performances (particularly Nithiin, Sadha and Gopichand) and music.

=== Critical reception ===
Jeevi of Idlebrain wrote, "First half of the film would be liked by class people as the style of narration is very poetic. Second half would be liked by masses compared to first half as it has got good action scenes. Over all, it's an average film." Arpan Panicker of Full Hyderabad wrote, "The second half drags and looks silly at times. The fight scenes especially are quite undigestable. There is only so much credit you can attribute to a flag. Jayam turns out to be just an average flick at the end of the day."

== Accolades ==
Award (Note: Awards, festivals and organizations are in alphabetical order.)	Date of ceremony (Note: Date is linked to the article about the awards held that year, wherever possible.)	Category	Recipient(s)	Result	Ref.
CineMAA Awards	5 October 2003	Best Director	Teja	Won	
CineMAA Awards	5 October 2003	Best Male Debut	Nithiin	Won	
CineMAA Awards	5 October 2003	Best Villain	Gopichand	Won	
CineMAA Awards	5 October 2003	Critics Best Music Director	R. P. Patnaik	Won	
Filmfare Awards South	24 May 2003	Best Film – Telugu	Chitram Movies (Film Production House)	Nominated	
Filmfare Awards South	24 May 2003	Best Director – Telugu	Teja	Nominated	
Filmfare Awards South	24 May 2003	Best Male Debut – South	Nithiin	Won	
Filmfare Awards South	24 May 2003	Best Actress – Telugu	Sadha	Won	
Filmfare Awards South	24 May 2003	Best Comedian – Telugu	Suman Setty	Nominated	
Filmfare Awards South	24 May 2003	Best Villain – Telugu	Gopichand	Nominated	
Filmfare Awards South	24 May 2003	Best Music Director – Telugu	R. P. Patnaik	Nominated	
Nandi Awards	18 February 2004	Best Villain	Gopichand (Note: Shared with Ahuti Prasad for Nenu Ninnu Premistunnanu)	Won	
Nandi Awards	18 February 2004	Best Male Comedian	Suman Setty	Won	
Nandi Awards	18 February 2004	Best Child Actress	Baby Swetha	Won	
Nandi Awards	18 February 2004	Best Female Dubbing Artist	Sunitha (for Sadha)	Won	
