= Gulabi (1995 film) =

1995 Telugu film by Krishna Vamsi

- Poster
- Directed by: Krishna Vamsi
- Written by: Krishna Vamsi
- Produced by: Ram Gopal Varma; Amitabh Bachchan
- Starring: J. D. Chakravarthy; Maheswari; Brahmaji
- Narrated by: Vikas Nallajerla
- Cinematography: Rasool Ellore
- Edited by: Shankar
- Music by: Sashi Preetam
- Production companies: Varma Creations; ABCL
- Distributed by: KAD
- Release date: 3 November 1995
- Running time: 138 minutes
- Country: India
- Language: Telugu

Gulabi (English: Rose) is a 1995 Telugu romantic crime film written and directed by debutant Krishna Vamsi. Produced by Ram Gopal Varma and Amitabh Bachchan Corporation Limited, the film stars J. D. Chakravarthy and Maheswari in the lead roles. Music was composed by Sashi Preetam and dialogues written by Nadiminti Narsinga Rao.

The story was inspired by a real-life incident involving a young girl rescued from a Dubai Sheikh. Gulabi received positive reviews and became a box-office hit. The film won two Nandi Awards, including Best First Film of a Director for Krishna Vamsi. It was later dubbed into Tamil as Idhayame Idhayame and remade in Hindi as Aashiq (2001).

== Plot ==
Gulabi is an action-packed love story set against the backdrop of human trafficking of young girls to Dubai. The film was inspired by a real-life incident that made headlines in news dailies when the police arrested a few Dubai-based businessmen trying to smuggle girls out of Hyderabad.

== Cast ==
- J. D. Chakravarthy as Chandrasekhar a.k.a. Chandu
- Maheswari as Pooja
- Brahmaji as Rambabu
- Chandra Mohan as Lakshminarayan Murthy, Chandu's father
- Banerjee as Inspector Prasad
- Chalapathi Rao as Pooja's father
- Y. Vijaya as Pooja's mother
- Jeeva

== Production ==
=== Development ===
During the production of Antham (1992), actor Nagarjuna expressed interest in collaborating with Krishna Vamsi and encouraged him to develop a compelling storyline. While searching for ideas, Vamsi came across a news article about a 14-year-old girl sold to a 70-year-old Dubai Sheikh and her eventual rescue by an air hostess. Inspired by this, he envisioned a film with a dramatic climax centered on the incident. The narrative combined action, violence, and emotional depth, aiming to align with Nagarjuna’s screen persona and to achieve an impact similar to Siva (1989), while reflecting Vamsi’s style.

However, the ambitious scope of the story required a substantial budget, which posed challenges. To address these constraints, Vamsi revised the script, reworking the narrative into a smaller-scale production. The revised story retained the original climax but introduced a love story backdrop with elements of action and emotion, making it more feasible within a limited budget.

After working as an assistant to Ram Gopal Varma on films like Siva and Gaayam, Krishna Vamsi was initially assigned as the director for Anaganaga Oka Roju. However, due to creative differences and escalating production costs, Krishna Vamsi stepped away from the project, and Ram Gopal Varma took over its direction. Subsequently, Krishna Vamsi redirected his focus to developing Gulabi.

When Ram Gopal Varma returned to Hyderabad after working on Rangeela in Bombay, he expressed interest in Gulabi. He agreed to produce the film under one condition: the budget must remain within ₹75 lakh. Varma assured Krishna Vamsi of complete creative freedom, promising not to interfere with the filmmaking process and stating that he would only watch the final film after its release. At the same time, producer D. Suresh Babu also showed interest in the project but requested a detailed evaluation of the script before moving forward. Ultimately, Vamsi chose to collaborate with Ram Gopal Varma, valuing the creative autonomy and support offered under his production.

=== Casting ===
The cast for Gulabi was chosen to align with the film's modest budget. J. D. Chakravarthy, a frequent collaborator of Krishna Vamsi, was cast as the male lead, despite his then-unestablished status. Krishna Vamsi originally wanted Tabu for the female lead in Gulabi, but due to scheduling conflicts, Maheswari was cast instead. Vamsi appreciated Maheswari's sophistication and expressive eyes, which ultimately led to her casting.

Other cast members included Jeeva, who was brought back to the industry after some gap, Chalapathi Rao in a rare soft role as the heroine’s father, and Chandra Mohan, the only senior actor in the cast.

=== Post-production ===
Krishna Vamsi collaborated with music composer Sashi Preetam, who was relatively inexperienced at the time. Together, they worked extensively on the film's soundtrack, recording its first song, "Ye Rojaithe Choosano Ninnu," at the newly established Ramanaidu Recording Theatres. This marked the studio's first song recording since its inception.

Post-production, actor Nagarjuna, impressed by Krishna Vamsi's handling of key scenes in Gulabi, cast Krishna Vamsi as the director for his subsequent film Ninne Pelladatha (1996).

== Music ==
Gulabi

Soundtrack album by Shashi Preetam
- Released: 19 February 1995
- Recorded: 1995
- Genre: Feature film soundtrack
- Length: 23:40
- Label: Aditya Music
- Producer: Shashi Preetam

The music was composed by Sashi Preetam. The soundtrack contains five songs and was very popular upon its release with "Ee Velalo Neevu" becoming a classic hit.

Track list
| No. | Title | Lyrics | Singer(s) | Length |
|---|---|---|---|---|
| 1. | "Beat In My Heart" | Sirivennela Seetharama Sastry | Mano, Gayatri Ganjawala | 5:23 |
| 2. | "Ee Velalo Neevu" | Sirivennela Seetharama Sastry | Sunitha Upadrashta | 4:20 |
| 3. | "Class Room Lo" | Sirivennela Seetharama Sastry | Hariharan | 4:35 |
| 4. | "Dream Girl" | Sirivennela Seetharama Sastry | Suresh Peters, Suchitra Krishnamoorthi | 4:45 |
| 5. | "Ye Rojaithe Chusano" | Sirivennela Seetharama Sastry | Shashi Preetam | 4:37 |
| Total length: | | | | 23:40 |

== Awards ==
Nandi Awards

- Best First Film of a Director - Krishna Vamsi
- Best Audiographer - P. Madhusudhana Rao
