= Ram Lakshman (stunt choreographers) =

Indian stunt choreographers

- Born: 1967 or 1968 (age 58–59); Prakasam district, Andhra Pradesh, India
- Occupations: Stunt choreographers, Stunt double
- Years active: 1990-present

Chella Ram and Chella Lakshman (also credited as Ram Lakshman) are an Indian action choreographer duo who work primarily in Telugu cinema. They got six state Nandi Awards for Best Fight Master. They worked with Vikram Dharma, Kanal Kannan, Peter Hein, Stun Siva, FEFSI Vijayan, Vijay, Anal Arasu, Stunt Silva, Dhilip Subbarayan, Ravi Varma and Anbariv.

== Career ==
Ram and Lakshman are twin brothers who hail from Prakasam district in Andhra Pradesh.

== Filmography ==
Year	Title	Language	Notes
1991	Naa Ille Naa Swargam	Telugu	
1993	Meleparambil Aanveedu	Malayalam	
1993	Uzhaippali	Tamil	
1997	Ettupatti Rasa	Tamil	
1997	Pasamulla Pandiyare	Tamil	Also actor
1997	Oru Yathramozhi	Malayalam	
1998	Bavagaru Bagunnara	Telugu	
2002	Action No. 1	Telugu	
2002	Khaidi Brothers	Telugu	
2004	Guri	Telugu	
2004	Arya	Telugu	
2005	Relax	Telugu	
2005	Majaa	Tamil	Also actor
2005	Andhrudu	Telugu	
2005	Naa Alludu	Telugu	Also actor
2006	Godavari	Telugu	
2006	Boys and Girls	Tamil	
2007	Dhee	Telugu	
2008	Neninthe	Telugu	
2008	Aegan	Tamil	
2009	Ride	Telugu	
2011	Osthe	Tamil	
2013	Sound Thoma	Malayalam	
2014	Legend	Telugu	
2016	Sarrainodu	Telugu	
2017	Khaidi No. 150	Telugu	
2017	Katamarayudu	Telugu	
2017	Duvvada Jagannadham	Telugu	
2018	Bharat Ane Nenu	Telugu	
2018	Rangasthalam	Telugu	
2018	Sarkar	Tamil	
2019	Kodathi Samaksham Balan Vakeel	Malayalam	
2019	Maharshi	Telugu	
2019	Ruler	Telugu	
2019	Ayogya	Tamil	
2020	Darbar	Tamil	
2020	Sarileru Neekevvaru	Telugu	
2020	Ala Vaikunthapurramuloo	Telugu	
2021	Akhanda	Telugu	
2021	Yuvarathnaa	Kannada	
2021	Alludu Adhurs	Telugu	
2021	Krack	Telugu	
2021	Pushpa: The Rise	Telugu	
2022	Khiladi	Telugu	
2022	Dhamaka	Telugu	
2022	James	Kannada	
2022	Etharkkum Thunindhavan	Tamil	
2022	Acharya	Telugu	
2022	Sarkaru Vaari Paata	Telugu	
2022	God Father	Telugu	
2023	Varisu	Tamil	
2023	Ramabaram	Telugu	
2023	Veera Simha Reddy	Telugu	
2023	Aadikeshava	Telugu	
2023	Bhola Shankar	Telugu	
2023	Tiger Nageswara Rao	Telugu	
2023	Waltair Veerayya	Telugu	
2023	Ottakkomban	Malayalam	
2023	Bruce Lee	Malayalam	
2024	Guntur Kaaram	Telugu	
2024	Martin	Kannada	
2024	Saripodhaa Sanivaaram	Telugu	
2024	Bhimma	Telugu	
2024	Saindhav	Telugu	
2024	Eagle	Telugu	
2025	Jaat	Hindi	
2025	Hari Hara Veera Mallu: Part 1	Telugu	
2025	Kantara: Chapter 1	Kannada	
2026	The RajaSaab	Telugu	

As actor

- Periyanna (1999; Tamil)
- Khaidi Brothers (2002)
- Action No. 1 (2002)
- Bangaru Kanda (2007)

== Awards ==
Nandi Awards

- 2004: Best Fight Master – Arya
- 2005: Best Fight Master – Andhrudu
- 2007: Best Fight Master – Dhee
- 2008: Best Fight Master – Neninthe
- 2009: Best Fight Master – Ride
- 2014: Best Fight Master – Legend

Santosham Film Awards

- 2023: Best Action – Waltair Veerayya

South Indian International Movie Awards

- 2013: Best Fight Choreographer – Gabbar Singh
