= Chandralekha (1997 film) =

1997 comedy film by Priyadarshan

- Poster
- Directed by: Priyadarshan
- Written by: Priyadarshan, Sreenivasan
- Produced by: Fazil
- Starring: Sukanya; Pooja Batra; Mohanlal; Nedumudi Venu; Sreenivasan
- Cinematography: Jeeva; K. V. Anand
- Edited by: N. Gopalakrishnan
- Music by: Berny-Ignatius; S. P. Venkatesh (Score)
- Production company: Fazils
- Distributed by: Swargachitra
- Release date: 4 September 1997
- Running time: 173 minutes
- Country: India
- Language: Malayalam

Chandralekha is a 1997 Indian Malayalam-language comedy film written and directed by Priyadarshan and produced by Fazil. It stars Sukanya and Pooja Batra in titular roles along with Mohanlal, Sreenivasan, Nedumudi Venu, and Innocent. The film's title is a portmanteau of the two female lead characters' names—Chandra and Lekha. Berny-Ignatius composed the songs, while the film score was composed by S. P. Venkatesh. The film's core plot was inspired by the 1995 Hollywood film While You Were Sleeping.

== Plot ==
Appukuttan Nair is a struggling unemployed youth who arrives in Mumbai to meet his sister and brother-in-law. His father has been falsely implicated in a bank fraud and wants to sell his ancestral property to pay towards the litigation. For that he needs his sister's approval, but is abused and turned away by his brother-in-law.

Disappointed, Appu seeks out his old pal Nooruddin, who is working in a fruit juice vending shop in Mumbai. Noor himself is a helpless uneducated youth working for his uncle Beeran, who is a treacherous money lender, with a hope to marry his daughter Maimoona. They plan to open a paint shop but need ₹1.25 lakh to rent a shop as prerequisite to get a bank loan. With no other way in sight, they swindle Beeran out of ₹1.25 lakh. Appukuttan then tries to get the loan sanctioned but he is rebuffed by a new Bank Manager varghese who had taken charge by then.

In a turn of events, Appukuttan happens to rescue a woman named Chandrika Varma after a car accident, hospitalising her. Chandra is the daughter of a wealthy businessman, Udhaya Varma. Appukuttan is mistaken by the hospital staff to be her husband, Alfred Fernandes. Soon her relatives including her father arrive and they too mistake him for Chandra's husband, because Chandra had eloped with Alfie, and no one among them had ever seen or talked to Alfie. Also it happened to be that Chandra was a major client of Appukuttan's Bank Manager Varghese, who too mistook Appukkuttan for Chandra's husband, and was now eager to oblige him with the loan. Appukuttan decides to masquerade as Alfie till he gets loan approval from the Bank Manager. Chandra lay bedridden paralysed unable to react, but with her cognition intact was able to witness all the commotions around her.

Some of the relatives of Chandra were never convinced about Appukuttan from the outset. Beeran is also hot on Appukuttan's trail to retrieve his money. To make matters worse for Appukuttan, Chandra's close friend Lekha, a medical graduate comes to visit her father Iravi, who is Udhaya Varma's assistant. She had talked to Alfie on the phone previously and is immediately suspicious about Appukkuttan. The relatives join with Lekha to find out the truth. Lekha and others play cat and mouse with Appukuttan trying to uncover his veracity, with Appukuttan staying ahead of the game for a while. Finally Lekha discovers the real story of Appukuttan and she is moved by his plight and enamored by his openhearted nature.

In the meantime, Chandra revives from her paralysis and she too forgives Appukuttan for everything; she also developed a liking for him. One of the jealous relatives of Chandra manages to expose Appukkuttan before everyone. Then Chandra admits all the truth to everyone. Hers was not in fact a car accident but was a suicide attempt after her fiancé, the real Alfie, had betrayed her, and their marriage had never commenced. Chandra recovers fully under the loving care of Appu and Lekha. Chandra falls in love with Appukuttan and hopes to marry him. However, she discovers that Lekha was already in love with Appukuttan, and had in fact given way for her as a favour to Chandra's father, to whom Lekha was like a second daughter. Chandra gracefully withdraws from her planned marriage with Appukuttan, and Appukuttan and Lekha are united together with everyone's hearty blessings.

== Cast ==
- Mohanlal as Appukuttan "Appu" Nair or Alfred "Alfie" Fernandez (Fake)
- Sreenivasan as Nooruddeen "Nooru", Appu's childhood friend
- Sukanya as Chandrika Varma / Chandra, Appu's love interest #1 (Voice dubbed by Anandavally)
- Pooja Batra as Lekha, Appu's love interest #2 (Voice dubbed by Bhagyalakshmi)
- Nedumudi Venu as Udhaya Varma, Chandra's father
- Innocent as Iravi Kutti Pillai, Lekha's father and Udaya Varma's driver
- M. G. Soman as Dr. Menon, Udaya Varma's family doctor
- Sukumari as Udaya Varma's elder sister
- Cochin Haneefa as DSP Sathyapalan, Udaya Varma's nephew
- Sadiq as Adv. Venu, Udaya Varma's relative
- Mamukkoya as Beeran / Beeranikka, Nooruddin's uncle
- Kuthiravattam Pappu as Sankara Kurup
- T. P. Madhavan as Doctor
- Reena as Shobha, Sathyapalan's wife
- Augustine as Raveendran Nair, Appukkuttan's brother-in-Law l
- Maniyanpilla Raju as Bank Manager Varghese
- Chandni Shaju as Maimuna, Beeran's daughter and Nooru's love interest.
- Mini Arun as Indu, Venu's Wife
- Antony Perumbavoor as Santhosh, an office staff member
- Anil Kapoor as a mad man mistaken to be Alfred Fernandez (Cameo appearance)
- Mink Brar as Lead dancer in the song "Maanathe Chandiranothoru" (Cameo appearance)
- Mukesh Madhavan as Ramachandran, Chandra's cousin (Photo Appearance)

== Production ==
Chandralekha brought back after a couple of years the successful comedy combo of Mohanlal and Sreenivasan, which was popular in the late-1980s and early-1990s. The name "Chandralekha" is a portmanteau of the names of the two female lead characters in the story—Chandra and Lekha. Bollywood actor Anil Kapoor plays a cameo role in the film. He appears as a lunatic, whom Appukuttan misunderstands as the original Alfie. Manju Warrier was offered a role but she could not sign the film.

== Soundtrack ==
The blockbuster songs of this film were written by lyricist Gireesh Puthenchery. The songs are composed by the music director duo Berny-Ignatius. The background score of the film was composed by S. P. Venkatesh. The song Innale Mayangunna is based on Bhanwara Bada Nadan Hain from Sahib Bibi Aur Ghulam. The song Maanathe Chandiranothoru was inspired from the famous Arabic artist Amr Diab's album Nour El Ain.

Track	Song	Singers
1	"Appukutta Thoppikkara"	M. G. Sreekumar, K. S. Chithra
2	"Ammoommakkili"	K. S. Chithra
3	"Maanathe Chandiranothoru"	M. G. Sreekumar, Malgudi Subha, Chorus
4	"Innale Mayangunna"	Sujatha
5	"Thamarapoovil"	M. G. Sreekumar
6	"Sa Pa Ma Pa"	Chorus

== Box office ==
Upon release, Chandralekha became the highest-grossing Malayalam film ever, until it was surpassed by Aaraam Thampuran (also starring Mohanlal), which was released by the end of the year.

== Awards ==
Mohanlal won the Screen Awards South for Best Actor for his performance in the film.

== Remakes ==
Chandralekha was remade into Telugu in the same name in 1998, with Nagarjuna reprising the role of Mohanlal. In 2000, it was remade in Hindi as Har Dil Jo Pyar Karega starring Salman Khan, directed by Raj Kanwar. It was remade in Kannada as Hey Sarasu starring Ramesh Aravind. The story has been adapted into Tamil as Summa Nachunu Irukku directed by A. Venkatesh.
