= Tommy (2015 film) =

- Film poster
- Directed by: Raja Vannem Reddy
- Screenplay by: Raja Vannem Reddy
- Story by: Chegondi Shilpa
- Based on: Hachiko
- Produced by: Chegondi Hari Babu; Bonam Chinna Babu
- Starring: Rajendra Prasad
- Cinematography: Mohan Chand
- Edited by: Nandamuri Hari
- Music by: Chakri
- Production company: Babu Pictures
- Release date: 13 March 2015
- Running time: 110 minutes
- Country: India
- Language: Telugu

Tommy is a 2015 Indian Telugu-language drama film directed by Raja Vannem Reddy. The film stars Rajendra Prasad alongside a beagle in the titular role with the music composed by Chakri.

The film received mixed reviews from critics. This film won Nandi Award for Akkineni Award for Best Home-viewing Feature Film and Rajendra Prasad also has garnered the Nandi Award for Best Character Actor for 2014 for the film.

== Cast ==
- Rajendra Prasad as Viswam Master
- Beagle as Tommy
- Seetha as Annapurna, Viswam Master's wife
- Suresh as Chandrasekhar
- L. B. Sriram as Veeraraju
- Raghu Babu
- Mumtaj as Viswam Master's daughter
- Surya as Station Master
- Venu Madhav as Viswam Master's brother-in-law
- Deepak
- Geetha Singh
- Aalapati Lakshmi as Venkatalakshmi

== Production ==
The film is an adaptation of the real story of Hachiko and was shot in 25 days.

== Soundtrack ==
Tommy

Film score by Chakri
- Released: 2015
- Genre: Soundtrack
- Length: 6:24
- Label: Murari Music
- Producer: Chakri

Chakri chronology
Erra Bus (2015)	Tommy (2015)	Vennello Hai Hai (2016)

Music composed by Chakri. Lyrics were written by Ananta Sriram. Music released on Murari Music Company.

No.	Title	Singer(s)	Length
1.	"Aakasam Ninu Pampinda"	Vijay Yesudas	2:20
2.	"Nuvve Kanipinchaka Pothe"	Vijay Yesudas	4:04
Total length:			6:24

== Awards ==
- 2014: Nandi Awards - Best Character Actor - Rajendra Prasad - won
- 2014: Nandi Award for Akkineni Award for Best Home-viewing Feature Film - Chegondi Hari Rama Jogaiah
