= Ninne Pelladata (1996 film) =

1996 film by Krishna Vamsi

- Theatrical release poster
- Directed by: Krishna Vamsi
- Written by: Story & Screenplay: Krishna Vamsi; Dialogues: Pruthvi Teja; Uttej
- Produced by: Nagarjuna
- Starring: Akkineni Nagarjuna; Tabu
- Cinematography: K. Prasad
- Edited by: Shankar
- Music by: Sandeep Chowta
- Production company: Annapurna Studios
- Distributed by: B4U Entertainment
- Release date: 4 October 1996
- Running time: 146 minutes
- Country: India
- Language: Telugu

Ninne Pelladata (transl. 'I will marry only you') is a 1996 Indian Telugu-language romantic family drama film written and directed by Krishna Vamsi and produced by Nagarjuna under the Annapurna Studios banner. The film stars Nagarjuna and Tabu, with music composed by Sandeep Chowta, marking his debut in Telugu cinema and composing for films.

The film's production began after Nagarjuna was impressed by Krishna Vamsi's work in Gulabi (1995). Initially, Krishna Vamsi had developed an action-oriented script, but following feedback from Gulabi, he shifted focus to a family-oriented drama.

Ninne Pelladata has set many records during its theatrical run and became the highest grosser in Telugu cinema. It received several accolades, including the 1996 National Film Award for Best Feature Film in Telugu. The film was later dubbed into Tamil as Unnaiye Kalyanam Pannikiren and remade in Kannada as Preethsod Thappa.

== Plot ==
Seenu, a cheerful young man, enjoys a happy life with his close-knit family and friends. His mother shares a special bond with him, and their family has a warm relationship with the neighboring Murthy family. Mahalakshmi, an aspiring pilot from Vizag, moves to Hyderabad for flight training and stays with the Murthy family, where she grows fond of their familial atmosphere. Over time, she develops feelings for Seenu, who reciprocates her affection. With the approval of Seenu’s family, their marriage is arranged.

However, it is soon revealed that Mahalakshmi’s mother is the estranged sister of Seenu’s father, having married against her brother's wishes, which created a longstanding family feud. This revelation complicates their relationship, as Mahalakshmi’s parents forcibly intervene and try to arrange her marriage to another man. Seenu and Mahalakshmi confront their families and urge them to reconcile. Their efforts lead to the resolution of the family conflict, allowing for the couple's marriage to proceed.

== Cast ==
- Nagarjuna Akkineni as Seenu
- Tabu as Mahalakshmi "Pandu" (Voice by S. P. Sailaja)
- Chalapathi Rao as Seenu's father
- Giri Babu as Hari
- Chandra Mohan as Murthy
- Ahuti Prasad as Prasad, Mahalakshmi's father
- Brahmaji as Sivaji
- Banerjee as Bachi
- Ravi Teja as Person teasing Mahalakshmi in pub & Get's thrashed by Seenu
- C. V. L. Narasimha Rao
- Jeeva
- Uttej as Anji
- Prudhviraj
- Lakshmi as Mahalakshmi
- Rama Prabha as Paapa
- Manju Bhargavi as Bhavani, Mahalakshmi's mother
- Kavitha
- Shanoor Sana
- Ramaraju
- Chitti
- Kadambari Kiran
- Geeta as Seenu's sister

== Production ==
=== Development ===
While Gulabi (1995) was still under production, director Krishna Vamsi caught the attention of Nagarjuna, who expressed interest in collaborating with him. Impressed by a few songs from Gulabi, Nagarjuna saw a couple of songs picturized for Gulabi and he instantly decided that Krishna Vamsi should direct his next film.. Krishna Vamsi wasn't too confident about directing a big star for a big project and was hesitant, but Nagarjuna encouraged him that he could do it. Nagarjuna announced the project even before the release of Gulabi, demonstrating his confidence in the director.

Initially, Krishna Vamsi developed a script featuring action and violence, scouting locations in Visakhapatnam for a project that would later become Samudram (1999). However, audience feedback about the violent tone of Gulabi led him to reconsider his approach. Seeking to distinguish his style from his mentor Ram Gopal Varma’s, Krishna Vamsi decided to create a family-oriented drama focusing on relationships and entertainment. Drawing inspiration from the celebratory and emotional themes of Hindi films like Hum Aapke Hain Koun..! (1994) and Dilwale Dulhania Le Jayenge (1995), he adapted their essence to suit Telugu audiences while avoiding their idealised, dreamy settings.

Krishna Vamsi completed the script in just 15 days and presented it to Nagarjuna. After a narration of the storyline, Nagarjuna approved the project. Krishna Vamsi aimed to incorporate Telugu cultural elements into the film, ensuring it remained relatable while retaining the emotional appeal of its Hindi counterparts.

=== Casting ===
Casting for the film involved extensive deliberation. Meena was initially considered for the female lead but could not commit due to scheduling conflicts. Krishna Vamsi screen-tested over 60 applicants for the female lead and suddenly realized that Tabu could best essay the role. Krishna Vamsi met her at the Mumbai airport and hurriedly narrated the script to her while she was waiting to catch a flight. Tabu expressed enthusiasm for the role and later received a detailed script reading in Madras, after which she formally joined the project.

The film's cinematography was handled by K. Prasad, with art direction by Peketi Ranga and editing by Shankar. Y. V. S. Chowdary served as the co-director.

== Soundtrack ==
Ninne Pelladata

Soundtrack album by Sandeep Chowta
- Released: February 1996
- Genre: Soundtrack
- Length: 33:21
- Labels: T-Series (Original); Time Audio (Hindi)
- Producer: Sandeep Chowta

The music for the film was composed by Sandeep Chowta, marking his debut as a film composer. Upon its release in 1996, the Ninne Pelladatha soundtrack stormed the charts and emerged as the era's definitive blockbuster album. The audio soundtrack was released under the T-Series label.

=== Track listing ===
==== Original version (Telugu) ====
Ninne Pelladata (Original Motion Picture Soundtrack)
No.	Title	Lyrics	Singer(s)	Length
1.	"Yeto Vellipoyindi"	Sirivennela Sitarama Sastry	Rajesh Krishnan	4:36
2.	"Greeku Veerudu"	Sirivennela Sitarama Sastry	Sowmya	4:33
3.	"Naa Mogudu Rampyari"	Suddala Ashok Teja	Malgudi Subha, Sunitha, Rajesh Krishnan	5:02
4.	"Kannulo Nee Roopame"	Sirivennela Sitaramasastri	Hariharan, K.S. Chithra	5:21
5.	"Inka Edho"	Sirivennela Sitaramasastri	Hariharan, Sowmya	4:32
6.	"Ninne Pelladesthanantu"	Sirivennela Sitaramasastri	Jikki, Sowmya, Ramakrishna, Saandip, Rajesh, Balaram	4:22
7.	"Nathora Thamashalalo"	Sirivennela Sitaramasastri	Sanjeev Wadhwani, Sujatha	4:54
Total length:				33:21

==== Tamil version ====
Unnaiye Kalyaanam Pannikkiren (Tamil dubbed)
No.	Title	Singer(s)	Length
1.	"Dhisai Maari poyaachu"	Rajesh Krishnan	4:36
2.	"Grekku Veerano"	Sowmya	4:33
3.	"En Purushan"	Malgudi Subha, Anuradha Sriram, Rajesh Krishnan	4:55
4.	"Kannukkul Un Uruvame"	Hariharan, Chitra	5:21
5.	"Innum Yedho"	Sowmya, Hariharan	4:30
6.	"Kanne Unnai"	Sowmya, Krishna Sundar, Rajesh Krishnan	4:22
7.	"Ennoda Vaa"	Sujatha, Sanjeev Wadhwani	4:54
Total length:			33:01

==== Hindi version ====
Jab Dil Kisi Pe Aata Hai (Hindi dubbed)
No.	Title	Singer(s)	Length
1.	"Yahin Kahin Khoya Hai"	Rajesh Krishnan	4:36
2.	"Dream Boy"	Sowmya Raoh	4:33
3.	"Ooyee Amma Ooyee Amma"	Kavita Krishnamurthy, Shubha, Rajesh Krishnan	4:55
4.	"Deewana Dil Kho Gaya"	Hariharan, Kavita Krishnamurthy	5:21
5.	"Jawani Kyun Machal Rahi"	Sowmya Raoh, Hariharan	4:30
6.	"Chhupke Chhupke Hum Se"	Sowmya, Krishna Sundar, Rajesh Krishnan	4:22
7.	"Aa Jana Yeh Dil Hai"	Sujatha, Sanjeev Wadhwani	4:54
Total length:			33:01

== Box office ==
Ninne Pelladatha was released on 4 October 1996 and became the highest grosser in Telugu cinema. The film created many area records across Telugu states. It had a 100-day run in 38 theatres and successfully completed silver jubilee. Ninne Pelladata was also the first Telugu film to gross over 1 crore in a single theatre (DEVI 70MM) in Hyderabad. It also set a new record in the Nizam region by completing a 100-day run in seven theatres. The movie extended its huge commercial success in other states as well.

Ninne Pelladata had successfully completed 100 days run in Bangalore's Tribhuvan theatre which was regarded as one of the highest capacity theatres at the time.

Ninne Pelladata was dubbed into Tamil as Unnaiye Kalyanam Pannikiren and became commercially successful at the Tamil Nadu Box Office.

== Accolades ==
Award (Note: Awards are in Alphabetical order.)	Date of ceremony (Note: Date is linked to the article about the awards held that year, wherever possible.)	Category	Recipient(s)	Result	Ref.
Filmfare Awards South	30 August 1997	Best Film – Telugu	Nagarjuna (Annapurna Studios)	Won	
Filmfare Awards South	30 August 1997	Best Director – Telugu	Krishna Vamsi	Won	
Filmfare Awards South	30 August 1997	Best Actress – Telugu	Tabu	Won	
Nandi Awards	1997	Akkineni Award for Best Home-viewing Feature Film	Ninne Pelladata (Nagarjuna)	Won	
Nandi Awards	1997	Best Male Playback Singer	Rajesh Krishnan for ("Yeto Vellipoyindi")	Won	
National Film Awards	15 July 1997	Best Feature Film in Telugu	Nagarjuna and Krishna Vamsi	Won	
