= Nandi Award for Best Fight Master =

Indian film award

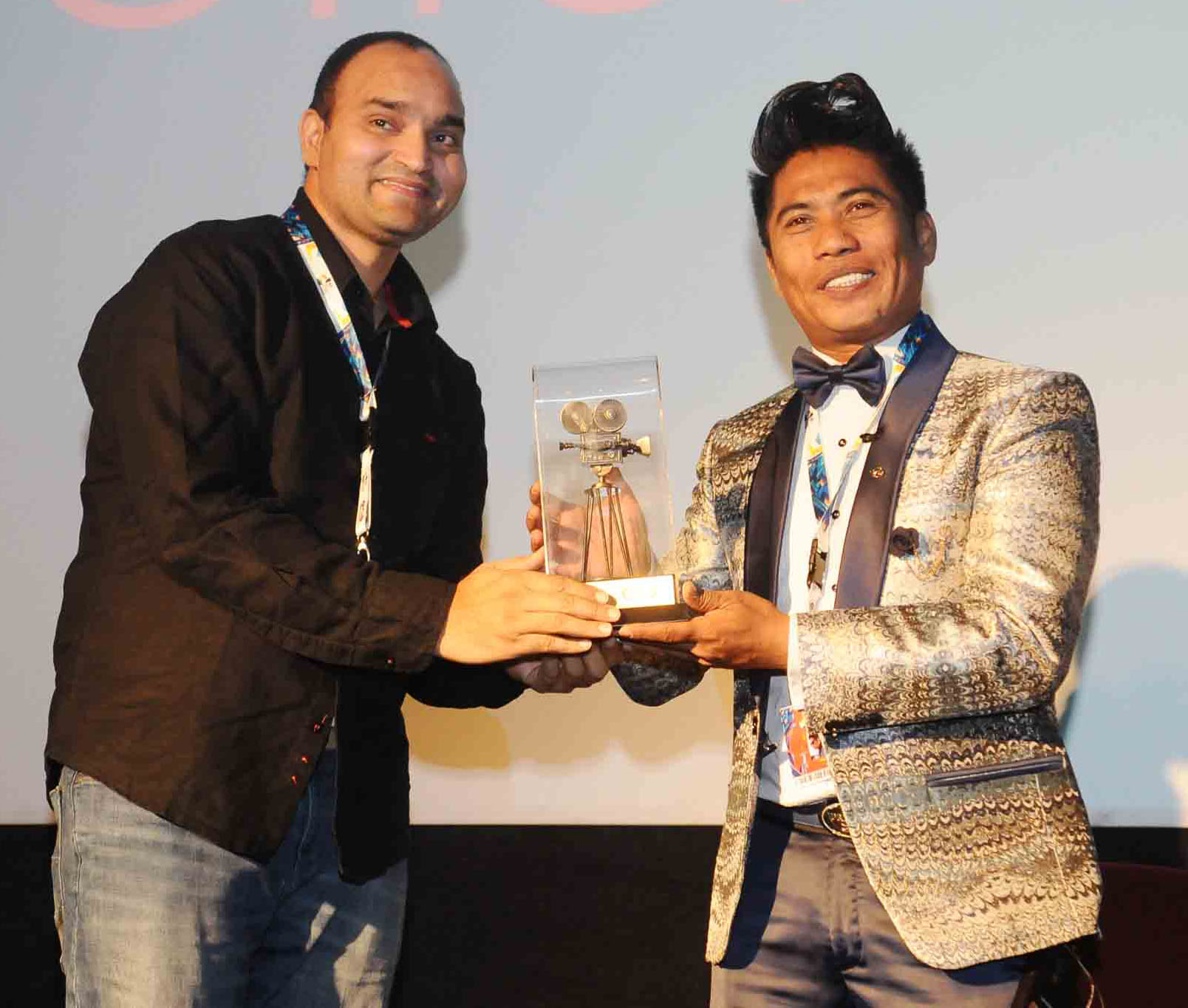
A token of appreciation presented to Peter Hein Offl by the Deputy Director, Shri Rizwan Ahmed, during the 47th International Film Festival of India (IFFI-2016), in Panaji, Goa on November 24, 2016.

The list of Nandi Award for Best Fight Master winners since 1999.

Year	Fighter	Film
2016	Venkata Nag	Supreme
2015	Peter Hein	Baahubali: The Beginning
2014	Ram Lakshman	Legend
2013	Venkata Nag	Kaalicharan
2012	Ganesh	Okkadine
2011	Vijay	Dookudu
2010	Sri Sekhar	Manasara
2009	Ram Lakshman	Ride
2008	Ram Lakshman	Neninthe
2007	Ram Lakshman	Dhee
2006	Vijay	Pokiri
2005	Ram Lakshman	Andhrudu
2004	Ram Lakshman	Arya
2003	Vijay	Okkadu
2002	Vijay	Takkari Donga
2001	Vijay	Bhadrachalam
2000	Kanal Kannan	Azad; Annayya
