= Nandi Award for Best Character Actor =

Indian film award

This is a list for the recipients of the S. V. Ranga Rao Nandi Award for Best Character Actor since 1995, the year when the award for this category was instituted.

== Winners ==
| Year | Best Actor | Film |
|---|---|---|
| 2016 | Naresh | Sathamanam Bhavati |
| 2015 | Allu Arjun | Rudhramadevi |
| 2014 | Rajendra Prasad | Tommy |
| 2013 | Naresh | Parampara |
| 2012 | Ashish Vidyarthi | Minugurulu |
| 2011 | Sammeta Gandhi | Rajanna |
| 2010 | AVS | Kothimooka |
| 2009 | L. B. Sriram | Sontha Vooru |
| 2008 | Mukku Raju | 1940 Lo Oka Gramam |
| 2007 | Ahuti Prasad | Chandamama |
| 2006 | Kota Srinivasa Rao | Pellaina Kothalo |
| 2005 | Chandra Mohan | Athanokkade |
| 2004 | Kota Srinivasa Rao | Aa Naluguru |
| 2003 | Prakash Raj | Amma Nanna O Tamila Ammayi |
| 2002 | Nandamuri Harikrishna | Lahiri Lahiri Lahirilo |
| 2001 | Tanikella Bharani | Nuvvu Nenu |
| 2000 | Prakash Raj | Azad |
| 1999 | Mallikarjuna Rao | Thammudu |
| 1998 | Prakash Raj | Antahpuram |
| 1997 | Paruchuri Venkateswara Rao | Sindhooram |
| 1996 | Kota Srinivasa Rao | Little Soldiers |
| 1995 | K. Viswanath | Subha Sankalpam |
| 1994 | Krishnam Raju | Jailor Gaari Abbayi |
