= Khadgam =

- Theatrical release poster
- Directed by: Krishna Vamsi
- Written by: Story & Screenplay: Krishna Vamsi; Dialogues: Sathyanand; Uttej
- Produced by: Sunkara Madhu Murali
- Starring: Srikanth; Ravi Teja; Prakash Raj; Sonali Bendre; Sangeetha; Kim Sharma
- Cinematography: S. K. A. Bhupathi
- Edited by: A. Sreekar Prasad
- Music by: Devi Sri Prasad
- Release date: 29 November 2002
- Running time: 144 minutes
- Country: India
- Language: Telugu

Khadgam (transl. Sword) is a 2002 Indian Telugu-language action drama film directed by Krishna Vamsi and produced by Sunkara Madhu Murali under Karthikeya Movies. It features Srikanth, Ravi Teja, Prakash Raj, Sonali Bendre, Sangeetha Krish and Kim Sharma in the prominent roles with music composed by Devi Sri Prasad. The film follows Koti and Murthy, struggling artists in Hyderabad, who find an ally in Amjed Bhai, a patriotic driver. Their lives intertwine with a cynical officer, Radhakrishna, as they unite to thwart a terrorist plot involving Amjed’s radicalised brother.

Released on 29 November 2002, the film was a blockbuster. The film won five Nandi Awards and three Filmfare Awards. The film is remade in Hindi as Insan (2005). The film has evolved into a cult classic in Telugu cinema, primarily revered for its unflinching portrayal of patriotism and its unapologetic stance on terrorism and religious extremism. During and after the film’s release, the cast and crew received threatening phone calls from extremist elements. These groups were unsettled by the film’s blunt, unflinching depiction of terrorist sleeper cells and the radicalisation of youth, which were seen as highly provocative at the time.

== Plot ==
Set against the volatile backdrop of Hyderabad, the story follows three individuals from different walks of life whose destinies collide in a battle for national integrity.

In the bustling streets of Hyderabad, where Koti, an aspiring actor, and his friend Murthy, a hopeful director, struggle to make their mark. Despite their passion, they are repeatedly humiliated and kicked out of film studios. Facing a severe financial crisis, they work as a junior artist and assistant director, respectively. Their desperation peaks when their landlord, M.S. Khaja, threatens to file a false theft complaint against them for six months of unpaid rent. Frightened, they seek refuge with Amjed Bhai.

Amjed Bhai is a patriotic auto driver who embodies the spirit of communal harmony. In a powerful introduction, he prevents a Muslim mob in his community from attacking a bus of Hindu pilgrims, protecting them at his own risk. Amjed treats Koti like a brother and uses his wit to fool Khaja, saving the duo from eviction. While Amjed is in love with Khaja’s daughter, Zubeda, his life is shadowed by the grief of losing a brother during past religious riots.

Parallelly, we are introduced to A.C.P. Radhakrishna, a tough, sincere police officer whose personal tragedy has fuelled a deep seated Islamophobia. After his fiancée was killed in a terrorist attack in Kashmir by the notorious Azar Khan, Radhakrishna’s sole mission is to hunt him down. He views all Muslims with suspicion, a prejudice that complicates his professional judgment. The protagonists eventually meet through Captain, a dedicated army officer and a close friend of Radhakrishna. Captain, whose own wife is Muslim, was helped by Amjed Bhai during their marriage. He encourages Koti’s acting dreams and tries to bridge the gap between Radhakrishna and Amjed, though the officer remains skeptical.

As the story progresses, Koti falls into a spiral of alcoholism following a failed romance. Amjed Bhai intervenes, motivating him to focus on his career. This encouragement pays off when Koti and Murthy successfully pitch a story to a producer. The resulting film becomes a massive hit, turning them into industry stars. However, tragedy strikes when Captain is kidnapped and brutally killed by the Pakistani Army during an emergency operation. His death enrages the trio, who later violently intervene when they witness a group of radicals disrespecting the Indian flag.

The tension escalates when it is revealed that Azar Khan, the terrorist, is actually Amjed’s younger brother, who had survived the riots and been radicalised. During a pursuit, Azar takes refuge in a masjid. Radhakrishna, in his fury, attempts to enter the holy site with his shoes on, sparking a riot as Amjed and others block him. This leads to Amjed’s arrest and Azar’s escape. The climax unfolds at a railway station where Azar takes passengers hostage, including Koti, Murthy, and their friend Pooja. Azar demands the release of his associate Masood and his brother Amjed. In a high stakes confrontation, Koti strikes Azar from behind, while Amjed, choosing his country over blood, kills Masood. Radhakrishna defuses a bomb strapped to Pooja and finally kills Azar. In the aftermath, as Amjed and his mother prepare to leave for Mecca, Radhakrishna apologizes for his prejudice. Amjed Bhai gracefully concludes that blood does not define brotherhood, identifying Radhakrishna and Koti as his true brothers.

== Cast ==
- Srikanth as Radhakrishna
- Ravi Teja as Koti
- Prakash Raj as Amjad
- Sonali Bendre as Swathi
- Pooja Bharti as Zubeda
- Kim Sharma as Pooja
- Sangeetha as Seethamahalakshmi
- Uttej as Murthy
- Pavala Syamala as Seethamahalaksmi's mother
- Ahuti Prasad as Swathi's father
- Shafi as Azhar
- Prudhvi as 30 Years Industry
- Brahmaji as Captain
- Vasu
- Subbaraju
- Raghu Babu
- M. S. Narayana as M.S. Khaja

== Soundtrack ==
The soundtrack of the movie was composed by Devi Sri Prasad. The concept behind the song "Govinda Govinda" is based on Adnan Sami's "Lift Karadey".

Khadgam

Soundtrack album by Devi Sri Prasad
- Released: 10 October 2002
- Recorded: 2002
- Genre: Film soundtrack
- Length: 31:28
- Label: Aditya Music
- Producer: Devi Sri Prasad

Devi Sri Prasad chronology
Sontham (2002)	Khadgam (2002)	Thotti Gang (2002)

Tracklist
No.	Title	Lyrics	Artist(s)	Length
1.	"Meme Indians"	Shakthi	Honey	7:04
2.	"Nuvvu Nuvvu"	Sirivennela Sitaramasastri	Sumangali	5:33
3.	"Aha Allari"	Suddala Ashok Teja	Chitra, Raquib	4:15
4.	"Khadgam"	Sirivennela Seetharama Sastry	S. P. Balasubrahmanyam	4:50
5.	"Govinda Govinda"	Sirivennela Seetharama Sastry	Sri, Devi Sri Prasad	4:32
6.	"Musugu Veyyoddu"	Sirivennela Seetharama Sastry	Kalpana	5:08

== Release ==
The film was dubbed into Hindi as Marte Dam Tak, into Tamil as Manik Baasha and into Bhojpuri as Bemisaal Hai Hum.

== Reception ==
Jeevi of Idlebrain.com wrote that "Though this film is made to represent the patriotic action film genre, Krishna Vamsi tried injecting all other five-genre elements. In that process, the patriotic aspect of the film did not get elevated". A critic from Full Hyderabad wrote that "Krishna Vamsi certainly deserves three cheers - not just for making an offbeat movie but also for studiously avoiding patriotic jing bang to convey his message".

== Awards ==
Year	Awards	Category	Recipient	Result	Ref.
2002	Nandi Awards	Best Director	Krishna Vamsi	Won	
2002	Nandi Awards	Best Film on National Integration	Sunkara Madhu Murali	Won	
2002	Nandi Awards	Best Art Director	P. Ranga Rao	Won	
2002	Nandi Awards	Best Makeup Artist	Kishore	Won	
2002	Nandi Awards	Special Jury Award	Ravi Teja	Won	
2002	Filmfare Awards South	Best Director - Telugu	Krishna Vamsi	Won	
2002	Filmfare Awards South	Best Supporting Actress - Telugu	Sangeetha	Won	
2002	Filmfare Awards South	Best Villain - Telugu	Shafi	Won	
