= Krishna Vamsi =

Indian director

- Born: Pasupuleti Venkata Bangarraju; 28 July 1962 (age 64); Andhra Pradesh, India
- Occupations: Film director; producer; screenwriter; choreographer
- Years active: 1995–2023
- Spouse: Ramya Krishna (m. 2003)
- Children: 1

Pasupuleti Venkata Bangarraju (born 28 July 1962), known professionally as Krishna Vamsi, is an Indian film director, screenwriter, and producer known for his work in Telugu cinema. In a career spanning three decades, he has received three National Film Awards, nine Nandi Awards, and three Filmfare Awards South.

Krishna Vamsi began his career as an assistant director to Ram Gopal Varma and made his directorial debut with the 1995 romantic crime film Gulabi. In 1996, he directed Ninne Pelladata, which became one of the highest-grossing Telugu films at the time. He later directed the critically acclaimed Sindhooram (1997), under his production house Andhra Talkies. Both films won the National Film Award for Best Feature Film in Telugu. Other notable films directed by Krishna Vamsi include Anthahpuram (1998), Murari (2001), Khadgam (2002), Danger (2005), Chandamama (2007), Mahatma (2009), Govindudu Andarivadele (2014), and Rangamarthanda (2023).

== Early life ==
Krishna Vamsi was born as Pasupuleti Venkata Bangarraju into a family that frequently relocated due to his father’s job in the Public Works Department, spending his childhood in various towns including Rayalaseema, Godavari, Vizag, and Ongole. He developed a passion for films early on, often watching multiple films a day during his school years.

After completing his intermediate education, he aspired to join the Film and Television Institute of India (FTII) in Pune. However, his father insisted he complete his graduation. He completed a B.Sc. degree from Tadepalligudem and an M.A. in Agricultural Economics from Agra University.

== Career ==
=== Distribution business ===
After returning from Agra, Krishna Vamsi and his friends ventured into film distribution, leasing theaters and distributing films like Khaidi (1983), starring Chiranjeevi, which proved highly profitable. However, subsequent ventures resulted in significant financial losses.

=== Entry into film industry ===
Lacking his parents' support to pursue a career in cinema, Vamsi left home and moved to Madras (now Chennai) in 1986. He initially worked as a light boy and later as an assistant cameraman, learning the craft through observation and hands-on experience. In 1987, he began working as an assistant director on a film produced by Silk Smitha. Although the project faced financial challenges and production delays, Vamsi persevered, gaining valuable experience working with editor Goutham Raju and assistant director Siva Nageswara Rao. Siva Nageswara Rao, who was co-directing Siva (1989), introduced Vamsi to Ram Gopal Varma, then a debutant filmmaker. Vamsi joined Siva as an assistant director, marking the beginning of a significant collaboration with Ram Gopal Varma.

After Siva, Krishna Vamsi continued working with Ram Gopal Varma on several films, including Kshana Kshanam (1991), Raat (1992), Antham (1992), and Gaayam (1993). He later directed Money Money (1994), a sequel to Money (1993), under Varma’s banner but was not credited for his work. His next project, Anaganaga Oka Roju (1995), faced financial difficulties and creative differences with Ram Gopal Varma, leading to Varma taking over the direction.

=== Directorial career ===
Krishna Vamsi’s subsequent film, Gulabi (1995), marked his directorial debut, though it faced challenges with its cast and production. Despite initial setbacks, the film caught the attention of actor Nagarjuna, who offered Vamsi the opportunity to direct a film for Annapurna Studios titled Ninne Pelladatha (1996), which became one of the highest-grossing Telugu films at the time.

He later directed the critically acclaimed Sindhooram (1997), under his production house Andhra Talkies. The film examines the complexities of Naxalism in Andhra Pradesh, focusing on the societal and emotional factors driving educated individuals to join the movement. Although the film received critical acclaim for its portrayal of a sensitive subject, it was a commercial failure. It won the National Film Award for Best Feature Film in Telugu.

Krishna Vamsi later directed notable films like Anthahpuram (1998), Murari (2001), Khadgam (2002), Danger (2005), Chandamama (2007), Mahatma (2009), Govindudu Andarivadele (2014), and Rangamarthanda (2023).

Krishna Vamsi also directed some songs for Okkadunnadu (2007) when director Chandra Sekhar Yeleti was unavailable.

== Personal life ==
Krishna Vamsi is married to South Indian actress Ramya Krishna. Before their marriage in 2003, Ramya Krishna had appeared in his film Chandralekha (1998).

Krishna Vamsi is an admirer of lyricist Sirivennela Sitarama Sastry, who wrote lyrics for several of Vamsi's films. Sitarama Sastry also adopted Krishna Vamsi in the traditional Hindu manner, though not legally.

== Filmography ==
Year	Name	Notes
1995	Gulabi	Nandi Award for Best First Film of a Director
1996	Ninne Pelladata	National Film Award for Best Feature Film in Telugu; Filmfare Best Director Award (Telugu)
1997	Sindhooram	National Film Award for Best Feature Film in Telugu (Producer & Director); Nandi Award for Second Best Feature Film – Silver
1998	Chandralekha	Remake of Chandralekha
1998	Anthahpuram	Filmfare Best Director Award (Telugu)
1999	Samudram	
2001	Murari	Nandi Award for Second Best Feature Film
2002	Shakti: The Power	Hindi remake of Antahpuram
2002	Khadgam	Nandi Award for Best Director Sarojini Devi Award for a Film on National Integration; Filmfare Best Director Award (Telugu)
2004	Sri Anjaneyam	
2005	Chakram	Nandi Award for Best Director
2005	Danger	
2006	Rakhi	
2007	Chandamama	Nandi Award for Best Director
2009	Sasirekha Parinayam	
2009	Mahatma	
2011	Mogudu	
2014	Paisa	
2014	Govindudu Andarivadele	Nandi Award for Best Story Writer
2017	Nakshatram	
2023	Rangamarthanda	Remake of Natsamrat
