= Mallemala Entertainments =

Production house for television shows

- Company type: Private
- Industry: Television
- Genre: Entertainment
- Founded: 10 April 1992; 34 years ago in Hyderabad, India
- Founder: Shyam Prasad Reddy
- Headquarters: Hyderabad, Telangana, India
- Area served: India
- Key people: M Deepthi Reddy
- Products: TV shows Film production
- Subsidiaries: M. S. Art Movies (1988–1991)

Mallemala Entertainments is an Indian media and entertainment company which produces films and television programs. Its television productions include reality TV shows, comedy shows, game shows, entertainment and factual programming in Telugu.

Its notable productions includes TV shows like Jabardasth, Extra Jabardasth, Star Mahila, Dhee, and Manasu Mamata. It produced films like Ammoru (1995), Anji (2004), and Arundhati (2009). Mallemala Entertainments also owns the entertainment website 123Telugu.com.

== History ==
Shyam Prasad Reddy made his debut as a producer in Tollywood with the film Thalambralu in 1987 under the banner M. S. Art Movies. Later in 1992, he founded Mallemala Entertainments and started producing films under this banner. He ventured into Television with the reality game show Star Mahila which became a popular show of the time.

Over the time, the company continued to produce various shows and series on television and became a complete television-only production company.

== Films ==
Film	Year	Director
Aagraham	1993	Kodi Ramakrishna
Ammoru	1995	Kodi Ramakrishna
Anji	2004	Kodi Ramakrishna
Arundhati	2009	Kodi Ramakrishna

== Television shows ==
Series/Show	Genre	Channel	First aired	Last Aired	Notes	Ref(s)
Star Mahila	Game show		1 January 2007	3 April 2021	Two seasons	
Sravana Meghalu	Drama		2007	2007	Abruptly Ended	
Thoorpu Velle Railu	Drama		2008	29 January 2011		
Dhee	Reality Dance		2009	Present	15th season ongoing	
Manasu Mamata	Drama Romance	ETV	31 January 2011	17 November 2021		
Jabardasth	Comedy	ETV	7 February 2013	Present		
Extra Jabardasth	Comedy	ETV	10 October 2014	Present		
Babai Hotel	Cooking	ETV Abiruchi	1 August 2017			
Cash S2	Game show	ETV	3 March 2018	December 2022		
Nuvvu Ready Nenu Ready	Game show		20 August 2020			
Sridevi Drama Company	Comedy		31 January 2021	Present		
Rechi	Comedy		2021	Present		
Rangula Ratnam	Drama		17 November 2021	Present		
Geetha Govindam	Drama Romance		2 February 2022	15 April 2023		
Suma Adda	Comedy talk show		7 January 2023	Present		
Pelli Pusthakam	Drama Romance		17 April 2023	Present		

== Digital media ==
Mallemala Entertainments also owns the entertainment website 123Telugu.com. It features information on film news and updates, film reviews, interviews with entertainment personalities, OTT and TV news. The website is available in both Telugu and English languages.

== See also ==
- M. S. Reddy
