= Shyam Prasad Reddy =

Indian film producer

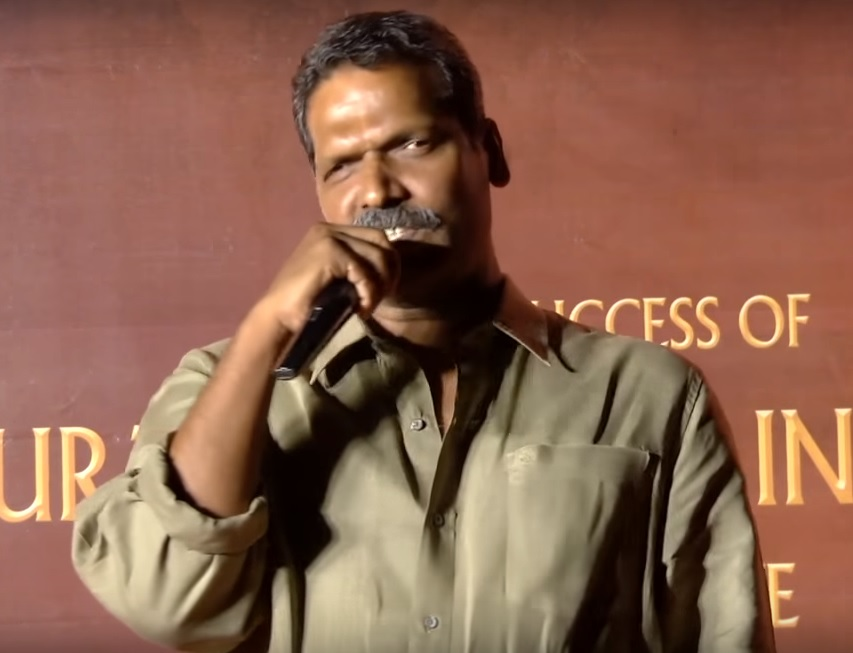
- Shyam Prasad Reddy addressing the gathering at the success meet of Mahanati
- Occupation: Producer
- Years active: 1985-present
- Spouse: Vara Lakshmi (m. 2002; died 2024)
- Parent: M. S. Reddy

Mallemala Shyam Prasad Reddy is an Indian film and television producer known for his work in the Telugu entertainment industry. He founded Mallemala Entertainments, a production company behind many successful films and TV shows. He is particularly acclaimed for pioneering the use of visual effects (VFX) in Telugu cinema.

Reddy produced several notable films on M. S. Art Movies banner, including Thalambralu (1986), Aahuthi (1987), Ankusam (1989), Ammoru (1995), Anji (2004), and Arundhati (2009). His collaborations with director Kodi Ramakrishna, especially on Ammoru, Anji, and Arundhati, are celebrated for advancing visual effects in Telugu cinema.

In later years, Shyam Prasad Reddy has shifted focus to television, producing popular shows like Jabardasth, Star Mahila, Dhee, Cash, and Genes.

== Early life ==
Shyam Prasad Reddy is the son of the noted film producer and lyricist M. S. Reddy. He completed his education in the United States before returning to India to pursue a career in film. Reddy underwent formal training in filmmaking, learning production techniques alongside family friend Ramoji Rao and studying directing under Kodandarami Reddy and P. N. Ramachandra Rao.

== Career ==
=== Film ===
Shyam Prasad Reddy made his debut as a producer with the film Vastad in 1985, followed by notable productions such as Thalambralu (1986), Aahuthi (1987), and Ankusam (1989). However, his 1991 film Aagraham did not achieve commercial success.

Disappointed by the response to Aagraham, Shyam Prasad Reddy sought decided to make a film in Telugu with extensive use of visual effects after watching Terminator 2: Judgment Day (1991). He produced Ammoru which released in November 1995. This film, which combined VFX with Indian mythology, set a new trend in Telugu cinema and became both a critical and commercial success. Ammoru also played a pivotal role in launching actress Soundarya's career, and its Tamil dubbed version, Amman, was similarly successful.

After the success of Ammoru, Reddy embarked on an ambitious project, Anji, which took over six years to complete due to production delays. Released on 15 January 2004, the film was praised for its visual effects and Chiranjeevi's performance but struggled commercially because of its high budget. However, it won two Nandi Awards and the National Film Award for Best Special Effects, becoming the first Telugu film to receive a National Award in this category. It was also recognized in the Limca Book of Records as the first Indian film to use 3D digital graphics.

Following Anji, Reddy conceived the idea for Arundhati while celebrating Anji's national award win. Shyam Prasad Reddy drew inspiration for Arundhati from childhood stories told by his aunt about mystic happenings in Gadwal Samsthanam, which formed the core story idea for the film. He envisioned Arundhati as a female-centric film with broad appeal, focusing on the battle between good and evil. Initially budgeted at ₹3 crore, the film's production costs grew to ₹13.5 crore, reflecting Reddy's commitment to delivering a visually impressive experience. Released on 16 January 2009, Arundhati became a major commercial success, grossing ₹70 crore at the box office and becoming one of the highest-grossing Telugu films at the time.

Reddy's collaborations with director Kodi Ramakrishna on films like Ammoru, Anji, and Arundhati are celebrated for their innovative use of VFX, significantly raising the standard of visual effects in Telugu cinema.

=== Television ===
In later years, Shyam Prasad Reddy successfully transitioned to television production, where he continued to make a significant impact. Mallemala Entertainments, the production company he founded in 1992, became known for producing popular television shows. Among these, the comedy show Jabardasth, which premiered on ETV in February 2013, stands out as one of the most widely viewed programs. Directed initially by Sanjeev K Kumar and later by his associates Nithin and Bharat, the show gained widespread popularity, despite occasionally courting controversy.

Other notable television productions by Mallemala Entertainments include Star Mahila, Dhee, Manasu Mamata, Cash, Genes, Sridevi Drama Company, Adhurs and Suma Adda.

=== Digital media ===
Mallemala Entertainments also operates the entertainment website 123Telugu.com, which provides film news, reviews, interviews, and updates in both Telugu and English.

== Filmmaking style ==
Shyam Prasad Reddy's filmmaking was influenced by international cinema, particularly Japanese and European independent films. His work is characterized by its thematic and visual grandeur, which often leads to increased budgets and extended production timelines, as seen in films like Anji and Arundhati. Reddy is recognized for his meticulous approach, paying close attention to details such as set design and costumes. He intentionally avoids certain genre conventions, like excessive gore, to focus on creating more immersive and compelling narratives. His filmmaking process is iterative, involving ongoing revisions and refinements; this was particularly evident in Arundhati, where he developed two major versions to achieve the desired quality.

== Personal life ==
Shyam Prasad Reddy was married to Vara Lakshmi, the daughter of former Andhra Pradesh Chief Minister Kotla Vijaya Bhaskara Reddy. Vara Lakshmi died of cancer in August 2024 at the age of 62. The couple had two daughters, Deepthi and Maithri.

Reddy is a passionate movie enthusiast, having watched multiple films daily in his earlier years. He also has a keen interest in Google Earth, enjoying virtual exploration of regions such as Andhra Pradesh and other areas.

== Filmography ==
Films produced
Year	Film	Notes
1985	Vastad	
1986	Thalambralu	
1987	Aahuthi	
1989	Ankusam	Nandi Award for Second Best Story Writer
1991	Aagraham	Nandi Award for Best National Integration Film
1995	Ammoru	Nandi Special Jury Award
2004	Anji	National Film Award for Best Special Effects
2009	Arundhati	Also writer
