= Nayakudu (film) =

2005 film

- Official poster
- Directed by: Kodi Ramakrishna
- Screenplay by: Kodi Ramakrishna
- Dialogues by: Ravi
- Based on: Runway
- Produced by: V. Saagar
- Starring: Rajasekhar; Namitha
- Cinematography: Ch. Ramana Raju
- Edited by: V. Nagi Reddy
- Music by: Koti
- Production company: Shrravane Cinema
- Release date: 15 September 2005
- Country: India
- Language: Telegu

Nayakudu (transl. Leader) is a 2005 Indian Telugu-language action film directed by Kodi Ramakrishna. A remake of the Malayalam film Runway (2004), the film stars Rajasekhar and Namitha while Nassar, Rami Reddy and Riyaz Khan play supporting roles. The film was released on 15 September 2005.

== Plot ==
The plot follows Raju (Rajasekhar) who pretends to his family that he worked in Dubai, however, he is a smuggling kingpin who goes by the name Spirit Sambasiva.

== Cast ==
- Rajasekhar as Rajagopalam "Raju"/ Spirit Sambasiva "Siva"
- Namitha as Uma
- Nassar as Razzaq
- Rami Reddy as Vadayar
- Riyaz Khan as Venugopal
- Thalaivasal Vijay as Vadayar's henchman
- Raghu Babu as Deva
- Giri Babu as Prasad Rao
- G. V. Sudhakar Naidu as Vadayar's henchman
- Benarjee as Police officer
- K. R. Vijaya as Bharatamma
- Jeeva
- Ahuti Prasad
- Narsing Yadav
- O Kalyan
- Ramesh
- Harsha
- Prudhvi Raj
- Varsha
- Amit Kumar as Vadayar's henchman
- Abu Salim as Police officer

== Production ==
The muhurat was held at Annapurna Studios on 11 February 2005. Kodi Ramakrishna, who collaborated with Rajasekhar for several films including Ankusam, teamed up after a hiatus.

== Soundtrack ==
Music by Koti. The audio release function was held at Telugu Film Chamber Of Commerce on 19 August 2005 with M. S. Raju, S. V. Krishna Reddy, Jeevitha, Madhu Shalini, and Ayyappa P. Sharma gracing the event.

Track listing
No.	Title	Lyrics	Singer(s)	Length
1.	"Nee Nadume Newzealand"	Chinni Charan	Karthik, Shalini	3:58
2.	"Kanne Chiluka"	Hanumantha Rao	Padma, Saketh	4:32
3.	"Aa Thoorupu Kondallo"	Sai Sri Harsha	Sridevi, Murali	3:49
4.	"Nayudoi Nayudoi"	Sai Sri Harsha	Manikka Vinayagam, Malathi	4:20
5.	"Vegu Chukka Shubamani"	Sai Sri Harsha	Udit Narayan, Sadhana Sargam	4:27
Total length:				21:06

== Release and reception ==
The film was released in mid-September.

M. M. of The Hindu called it a "neat action film" and wrote, "Though the film is full of sentiment and love, the basic backdrop is action. Some scenes look cinematic, but they are passable". Reviewing the film for Zamin Ryot, Griddaluru Gopalrao appreciated the storyline and performances. He stated that director Kodi Ramakrishna had succeeded in adapting Runway in a Telugu setting. On the other hand, Jeevi from Idlebrain.com rated the film 2.5 out of 5 and wrote, "On a whole, the combination of Raja Sekhar - Kodi Rama Krishna (Ankusam) disappoints us with Nayakudu". A critic from Sify called it "avoidable," adding, "The story and presentation of director Kodi Ramakrishna is old wine in new bottle. The shot takings and situations are all taken in an old fashioned manner which makes the proceedings move at snail pace".
