= Abhimanyu (1990 film) =

- Directed by: Ravi Raja Pinisetty
- Story by: Kodi Ramakrishna
- Based on: Ankusham (1990) by Ravi Raja Pinisetty
- Produced by: Sri Sudarshan Productions
- Starring: V. Ravichandran; Ananth Nag; Seetha
- Cinematography: Lok Singh
- Edited by: Vemoori Ravi
- Music by: Hamsalekha
- Production company: Sri Sudarshan Productions
- Release date: 29 August 1990
- Running time: 135 minutes
- Country: India
- Language: Kannada

Abhimanyu is a 1990 Indian Kannada-language action-drama film written and directed by Ravi Raja Pinisetty. The film starred V. Ravichandran, Seetha, and Ananth Nag, while many other prominent actors featured in supporting roles. The soundtrack and score composition was by Hamsalekha. The film was a remake of 1989 Telugu film Ankusam. In a protest sequence, Ravi Teja appeared as a student leader in a small scene.

== Premise ==
Inspector Abhimanyu (V. Ravichandran) learns that a thug-for-hire named "Spot" Naga (Rami Reddy) is assigned to kill his former mentor-turned-Chief Minister G.K.S Master (Anant Nag). Abhimanyu sets out to thwart Naga's plans.

== Cast ==
- V. Ravichandran as Inspector Abhimanyu
- Seetha as Seetha
- Ananth Nag as CM G.K.S Master
- Rami Reddy as "Spot" Naga
- Vaishali Kasaravalli
- Doddanna
- Veena
- Mysore Lokesh
- Lohitashwa
- Ravi Teja as the student leader in protest

== Soundtrack ==
The music was composed and the lyrics were written by Hamsalekha and the audio rights were acquired by Lahari Music.

Track listing
No.	Title	Lyrics	Singer(s)	Length
1.	"Kallige Praana"	Hamsalekha	S. P. Balasubrahmanyam, Manjula Gururaj
2.	"Usira Mele"	Hamsalekha	S. P. Balasubrahmanyam, Manjula Gururaj
3.	"Desha Hinge Aadre"	Hamsalekha	S. P. Balasubrahmanyam
4.	"Kele Kele Bharatha Mathe"	Hamsalekha	K. J. Yesudas, Chandrika Gururaj
