= Ammoru =

1995 Indian film directed by Kodi Ramakrishna

- DVD cover
- Directed by: Kodi Ramakrishna
- Written by: Satyanand (dialogues)
- Story by: M. S. Arts Unit
- Based on: Gramadevata, Durga
- Produced by: Shyam Prasad Reddy; R. B. Choudary (Tamil)
- Starring: Ramya Krishna; Soundarya; Suresh; Rami Reddy; Baby Sunaina; Vadivukkarasi; Kallu Chidambaram; Babu Mohan
- Cinematography: Vijay C. Kumar
- Edited by: K. V. Krishna Reddy
- Music by: K. Chakravarthy; Sri Kommineni
- Production company: M. S. Art Movies
- Release date: 23 November 1995
- Running time: 129 minutes
- Country: India
- Language: Telugu
- Budget: ₹1.8 crore

Ammoru (transl. Mother Goddess) is a 1995 Indian Telugu language Hindu mythological-fantasy film directed by Kodi Ramakrishna. The film was produced by Shyam Prasad Reddy, and stars Ramya Krishna in the titular role as Ammoru, with Soundarya as her devotee Bhavani. Actors Suresh, Rami Reddy, Baby Sunaina, and Vadivukkarasi played key roles. The film's soundtrack was composed by Sri and cinematography was helmed by Vijay C. Kumar.

Ammoru is noted for its pioneering use of visual effects in South India cinema. The film set a new benchmark in Telugu cinema upon its release. It was both a critically acclaimed and commercially successful film. The success of Ammoru played a key role in elevating the careers of actresses Soundarya and Ramya Krishna.

The film won two Nandi Awards and was dubbed into Tamil as Amman, which was also successful. It was later remade in Gujarati as "Dashe Dishaye Dasha Ma" (2000), and in Bengali as Debi (2005).

== Plot ==
When an epidemic torments a village, the priests suggest people to conduct a fair and worship the goddess Ammoru. On the festival night, an old lady visits the premises and asks the women there for prasadam, only one kind-natured young woman offers it. Later that night, the old lady visits the house of the said young woman with a potion made of neem leaves and instructs her to sprinkle it in front of all the houses in the village to end the epidemic. In the meantime, the old lady vows to remain and guard the house until the young woman's return. Neem potion in hand, the woman heads outside to dutifully begin the task the old lady has assigned her. However, midway through, she suddenly remembers that she has not provided food for her guest and promptly returns to do so. As she approaches her house, she catches glimpse through the window of her guest radiantly seated inside in the majestic form of the Goddess Herself. Realising the old lady is in fact the Goddess' incarnation, and remembering Her vow to remain, the young woman—hoping to keep the Goddess there forever to protect the village and its people— completes her assigned task and promptly commits suicide by jumping into a well. The Goddess, thus obliged to stay at the young woman's home permanently, turns into an murti, around which a temple gets built.

Later, Bhavani, an ardent devotee of the Goddess, informs the police about Ghorakh, a sorcerer who killed a young girl by burying her alive, and gets him arrested. As an act of revenge, Ghorakh's sister Leelamma and her family torture Bhavani. In one of their attempts, Bhavani is married to Ghorakh's nephew Surya, a kind-hearted doctor. When Surya visits the US on a business trip leaving behind his wife, Leelamma tries to kill her with the help of Leelamma's creditor. The Goddess reappears, vanquished Leelamma's creditor, and takes the form of a young girl called Papa who takes a job as a servant in Bhavani's house to protect her. There She repeatedly sabotages the evil plans of Leelamma, her husband, and their daughter. Leelamma's elder male servant, Chidambaram, realises that Papa is the Goddess and stays loyal to Her. When Surya returns to India after his American business trip, Leelamma falsely alleges that Bhavani is involved in an illicit affair by framing her with another man in their bedroom. But Papa cleverly switches Leelama's daughter in the place of Bhavani. The daughter is subsequently married off to that man.

Meanwhile, Ghorakh is released from jail due to his Epilepsy condition. But he remains unchanged and decides to take revenge against Bhavani who was responsible for his arrest. First, he tries to kill her by poisoning her food while she is pregnant. But the Goddess, in the form of Papa, intervenes and helps Bhavani give birth to a healthy baby daughter. Ghorakh realises that some divine power is making his power futile. He finds out that the young girl is the Goddess who is obstructing his evil plans. Ghorakh then tricks Bhavani to dismiss Papa from her employ. Bhavani states that Papa must not return unless she puts Bottu(బొట్టు) on the Goddess' forehead and asks for Papa to come. Ghorakh then kills Bhavani's infant daughter and tortures Surya with the help of an evil spirit, Chanda. Bhavani prays to the Goddess to save her, but the Goddess cannot respond as Bhavani has not fulfilled the condition she had set of her return. At last, in the temple Bhavani puts her hand on the Goddess's Trishula and bleeds. Ghorakh pulls her in a bid to disrobe her, causing a few drops of Bhavani's blood to spill onto the Goddess' forehead, forming a bottu which immediately summons Her to return. The Goddess arrives in Her fiercest form and kills Ghorakh. Surya and Bhavani realise that Papa was the Goddess all along. The Goddess returns Bhavani's baby daughter (whom She saved from Ghorakh) and blesses them.

== Cast ==
- Ramya Krishnan as the goddess Ammoru
- Soundarya as Bhavani (Voice dubbed by actress Saritha)
- Baby Sunaina as the young girl (Papa) / Ammoru.
- Suresh as Surya
- Rami Reddy as Gopalakrishna "Ghorakh"
- Vadivukkarasi as Leelamma
- Babu Mohan as Leelamma's husband
- Shruthi as Leelamma's daughter
- Kallu Chidambaram as Chidambaram, Leelamma's servant

== Production ==
=== Development and Casting ===
Shyam Prasad Reddy disappointed with the response of his previous production Aagraham (1991), decided to make a film in Telugu with extensive use of visual effects after watching Terminator 2: Judgment Day (1991). He chose Y. Rama Rao, an assistant of Kodandarami Reddy, as director. Chinna was cast as the antagonist sorcerer, but was later replaced by Rami Reddy. Ramya Krishna was cast in the title role of the Goddess Ammoru, marking a departure from her usual glamorous roles. Soundarya was selected to portray her devotee, after she was recommended by Babu Mohan. Although it was Soundarya's third film, the lengthy production process resulted in its release as her 27th. She dedicated 180 days to the project. The film also featured Suresh as the male lead, and Baby Sunaina as Ammoru's child avatar.

=== Filming ===
Filming began in July 1992 at Ayinavilli in East Godavari district of Andhra Pradesh. Initially the film was directed by Y. Rama Rao, he was later replaced by Kodi Ramakrishna as producer Shyam Prasad Reddy was dissatisfied with the film's outcome. To enhance his understanding of visual effects, Kodi Ramakrishna studied related materials before taking up the project. Cinematography was handled by Vijay C. Kumar, who said he utilized blue matte technology for the graphics. Despite lacking a major star cast, the film was shot twice over three years with a budget of ₹1.8 crore, of which ₹1.2 crore was dedicated to visual effects, a heavy investment in Telugu cinema at the time.

== Music ==
Chakravarthy was initially chosen to compose the music, but since he was unwell at that time his son Sri was selected to compose.

Track list
No.	Title	Lyrics	Singer(s)	Length
1.	"Ammoru Maa Thalli"	Rasaraju	S. P. Balasubrahmanyam, K. S. Chitra
2.	"Challani Maatalli Ammoru"	Mallemaala	K. S. Chithra
3.	"Dandalu Dandalu"	Mallemaala	K. S. Chithra, Mano, Lalitha Sagari, Madhavapeddi Ramesh
4.	"Emani Piluvanu Nenu"	Mallemaala	K. S. Chithra, Mano
5.	"Kapadu Devatha"	Mallemaala	Vandemataram Srinivas
6.	"Yeduru Tirigi Niluvaleka"	Mallemaala	K. S. Chithra

== Reception ==
Ammoru was released on 23 November 1995, and became a commercial successful film.

Reviewing the Tamil version Amman, D. S. Ramanujam of The Hindu wrote, "Soundarya puts her heart and soul into her performance as the hapless girl caught in the vicious circle of her relatives and in the scene where she loses her baby and in the portion trying to save her afflicted husband from Gorak's spell without inviting the help of the Goddess, she sizzles."

== Awards and honours ==
Filmfare Awards

- Best Actress – Telugu - Soundarya

Nandi Awards

- Special Jury Award - Shyam Prasad Reddy - Soundarya
- Best Makeup Artist - M. Chandra Rao
- Best Female Dubbing Artist - Saritha

== Legacy ==
The success of Ammoru established the trend of mythological fantasy films with visual effects in Telugu cinema. It elevated the profile of director Kodi Ramakrishna who gained reputation for directing fantasy and graphics-heavy films. After Ammoru, he directed other notable visual effects-based films, including Devi (1999), Deviputrudu (2001) and Anji (2004).

The film proved to be a launchpad for Soundarya, who went on to become a major star in Telugu cinema. Ramya Krishna was praised for her versatility in playing both glamorous and divine roles, she received widespread acclaim for her portrayal of the Goddess, similar to the veteran actress K. R. Vijaya.
