= Rami Reddy (actor) =

Indian actor

- Born: Gangasani Rami Reddy; 1 January 1959; Vayalpadu, Annamayya, Andhra Pradesh
- Died: 14 April 2011 (aged 52); Hyderabad, Andhra Pradesh
- Occupations: Actor, director, producer
- Years active: 1989–2011
- Height: 1.83 m (6 ft 0 in)
- Children: 3

Gangasani Rami Reddy (1 January 1959 – 14 April 2011) was an Indian actor in Telugu and Hindi cinema. He was also a film director and producer. He is known for his negative roles, character roles, and comedy timing. He was a well-known villain, and he had an inimitable style with typical Telangana dialect. He shot to fame with his dialogue "spot pedatha" in the film Ankusam.

== Early life ==
Gangasani Rami Reddy was born on January 1 1959, in Chittoor district at Valmikipuram, formerly known as Vayalpad. He did his BCJ in journalism from Osmania University.

== Career ==
Before entering films, Reddy worked with The Munsif Daily as a journalist. He shot to fame with his role as 'Spot Neelakantham' in the super hit film Ankusam and other movies including Osey Ramulamma, Ammoru, Gaayam, Anaganaga Oka Roju and Peddarikam. He acted in more than 250 films as a villain and character actor in Telugu, Hindi, Tamil, Kannada, Malayalam and Bhojpuri languages.

== Death ==
Rami Reddy developed liver and kidney ailments. He died on 14 April 2011 in a private hospital in Secunderabad. He was 52 and is survived by his wife, two daughters, and a son.

== Filmography ==
=== Telugu films ===
| Year | Film | Role | Notes |
|---|---|---|---|
| 1989 | Ankusam | "Spot" Neelakantham | |
| 1990 | Jagadeka Veerudu Athiloka Sundari | Abbulu | |
| 1991 | Ramudu Kadhu Rakshasudu | Vishwasa Rao | |
| 1991 | Niyantha | Bangaru Kotaiah | |
| 1991 | Parama Sivudu | | |
| 1991 | Tharaka Prabhuni Deeksha Mahimalu | | |
| 1991 | Kshana Kshanam | Inspector Yadav | |
| 1992 | 420 | Rankaa | |
| 1992 | Prema Sikharam | | |
| 1992 | Balarama Krishnulu | Nukaraju | |
| 1992 | Subba Rayudi Pelli | | |
| 1992 | Peddarikam | Son of Parvataneni Parasu Ramayya | |
| 1993 | Gaayam | Sarkar | |
| 1994 | Allari Premikudu | Bhairavaiah | |
| 1994 | Rickshaw Rudraiah | | |
| 1994 | Jeevitha Khaidi | Garudadri | |
| 1995 | Ammoru | Gorakh | Dubbed in Tamil as Amman |
| 1995 | Adavi Dora | | |
| 1995 | Street Fighter | Kanakaraju | |
| 1995 | Khaidi Inspector | Srinivas Yadav aka Seenu | |
| 1996 | Amma Durgamma | | |
| 1997 | Anaganaga Oka Roju | Chocolate | |
| 1997 | Hitler | Rudraraju | |
| 1997 | Bobbili Dora | | |
| 1997 | Osey Ramulamma | Landlord Jagannayak Patwari | |
| 1997 | Rowdy Durbar | Bandi Seenu | |
| 1998 | Sreevarante Maavare | | |
| 1999 | Police | Narasimham | |
| 2000 | Adavi Chukka | Gurunatham | |
| 2000 | Sivanna | | |
| 2000 | Sammakka Sarakka | Chinarama chandrayya dora | |
| 2000 | Okkadu Chalu | Appala Naidu | |
| 2000 | Balaram | Harishchandra Prasad | |
| 2000 | Ee Tharam Nehru | Durga | |
| 2000 | Ganapathi | | |
| 2000 | Manasichanu | | |
| 2001 | Mrugaraju | | |
| 2001 | Snehamante Idera | Puliraju | |
| 2002 | 2 Much | | |
| 2003 | Raghavendra | | |
| 2003 | Sambhu | | |
| 2003 | Villain | | |
| 2004 | Anji | Guruji | |
| 2004 | Seshadri Naidu | | |
| 2005 | Kaki | | |
| 2005 | Pellam Pichodu | Seth Kishanlal | |
| 2005 | Slokam | | |
| 2005 | Athanokkade | Pattabhai | |
| 2005 | Nayakudu | Vadayar | |
| 2005 | Bhamakalapam | | |
| 2006 | Mudhu | | |
| 2006 | Samanyudu | Ramu Yadav | |
| 2008 | Adhe Navvu | | |
| 2008 | Deepavali | Sub-Inspector of Police | |
| 2009 | Jagadguru Sri Shiridi Sai Baba | | |
| 2010 | Dammunnodu | | |
| 2010 | Sandadi | | |
| 2010 | Anaganaga Oka Aranyam | | |

=== Hindi films ===
| Year | Film | Role | Notes |
|---|---|---|---|
| 1990 | Pratibandh | "Spot" Nana | |
| 1993 | Insaniyat Ke Devta | Jabbar Singh | |
| 1993 | Waqt Hamara Hai | Colonel Chikara | |
| 1994 | Elaan | Mana Shetty | |
| 1994 | Dilwale | Goon | |
| 1994 | Khuddar | Swami Patil | |
| 1995 | Angrakshak | Vellu | |
| 1995 | Andolan | Baba Naayak | |
| 1995 | Haqeeqat | Anna | |
| 1995 | Veer | | |
| 1996 | Angaara | Honda Dada | |
| 1996 | Rangbaaz | Nandu | |
| 1997 | Jeevan Yudh | Madan | |
| 1997 | Kaalia | Bhawani Singh | |
| 1997 | Loha | Takla | |
| 1998 | Chandaal | Durjan Rai Sahab Singh | |
| 1998 | Hatyara | Shishupal Singhania | |
| 1998 | Gunda | Kala Shetty | |
| 1999 | Ganga Ki Kasam | Police inspector | |
| 1999 | Dada | Yashwant Anna | |
| 1999 | Shera | | |
| 1999 | Jaanwar | Raghu Shetty | |
| 1999 | Sautela | | |
| 2000 | Qurbaniyaan | | |
| 2000 | Bhoot Raaj | Patloo | |
| 2000 | Daku Ramkali | | |
| 2000 | Krodh | Kavre | |
| 2001 | Galiyon Ka Badshah | | |
| 2003 | Tada | Bitthal Rao | |
| 2003 | Satyaghath: Crime Never Pays | Abbas Ali | |
| 2004 | Police Force | Kutty Baba | |

=== Other language films ===
| Year | Film | Role | Language | Notes |
|---|---|---|---|---|
| 1990 | Abhimanyu | "Spot" Naga | Kannada | |
| 1991 | Abhimanyu | Abbas Ali | Malayalam | |
| 1991 | Naadu Athai Naadu | | Tamil | |
| 1992 | Mahaan | Rama Reddy | Malayalam | |
| 1993 | Gadibidi Ganda | | Kannada | |
| 1998 | Thulli Thirintha Kaalam | Devi's father | Tamil | |
| 1999 | Maya | Bangara Raju | Tamil | |
| 1999 | Jayasoorya | Bangar Rao | Kannada | |
| 1999 | Nenjinile | Supari | Tamil | |
| 2001 | Lankesha Kottai Mariamman | Mantramoorthi in kottai Mariamman | Tamil (kottai Mariamman) and Kannada (Lankeshan) | |
| 2007 | Police Story 2 | | Tamil (kottai Mariamman) and Kannada (Lankeshan) | |
| 2007 | Panthaya Kozhi | Nachiyappa Gounder | Malayalam | |
| 2008 | Khiladi No. 1 | | Bhojpuri | |

== Awards ==
- Nandi Award for Best Villain - Ankusam (1989)
