= Sri Krishna Vijayamu =

- Theatrical release poster
- Directed by: Kamalakara Kameswara Rao
- Written by: Pingali Nagendra Rao (dialogues)
- Screenplay by: M. S. Reddy
- Story by: M. S. Reddy
- Produced by: M. S. Reddy
- Starring: N. T. Rama Rao; Jayalalithaa
- Cinematography: Ellappa
- Edited by: B. Gopala Rao
- Music by: Pendyala Nageswara Rao
- Production company: Kaumudi Art Pictures
- Release date: 11 January 1971
- Running time: 148 mins
- Country: India
- Language: Telugu

Sri Krishna Vijayamu (transl. Victory of Lord Krishna) is a 1971 Indian Telugu-language Hindu mythological film produced by M. S. Reddy under the Kaumudi Art Pictures banner and directed by Kamalakara Kameswara Rao. It stars N. T. Rama Rao and Jayalalithaa, with music composed by Pendyala Nageswara Rao. The film flopped at the box office. It was dubbed into Hindi as Hare Krishna in 1974.

== Plot ==
Krishna sends his cousin, Satyaki, to the Yavana king Kalayavana with a gift of a vessel containing a snake, indicating that he is playing with a snake. In retaliation, Kalayavana sends his twin, Mahodara, with the same vessel, filled with ants, symbolizing that even ants can kill a snake. Shockingly, it is still alive when Krishna admonishes him. Then, Narada tells the demon of Krishna's whereabouts, resulting in a cat-and-mouse chase. Kalayavana ends up in a dark cave and kicks a sleeping man he believes to be Krishna. The man turns out to be the former warrior king Muchukunda, whose gaze can reduce he who wakes him up to ashes, thus killing Kalayavana.

Later, on Krishna's birthday, his eight wives present eight gems, to which Narada exclaims that it would be better if there was one more, implying that Krishna marry again, which Krishna agrees with.

Meanwhile, Mahodara succeeds Kalayavana and seeks vengeance on Krishna. However, Narada bars him and proclaims that he requires finesse, influencing him to perform an immense penance and acquire a boon from Shiva that he cannot be injured by any weapon unleashed by another person. With this boon, he becomes almost invincible and wreaks havoc over the universe, molesting many women. Seeing this, Brahma creates the beautiful Vasundhara, who as long as she wears a specific ring, will appear as a statue to all men, except her soulmate. Plus, after her wedding, if one tries to remove the ring, it will transform into a weapon and kill them. Brahma entrusts Narada to be her father and manage her marriage.

After Mahodara attempts to pursue Vasundhara, Narada brings her to Dwaraka under Rukmini's protection and reveals the ring's secret to Rukmini, assuring her that Vasundhara will not attract Krishna's attention. Ironically Krishna is Vasundhara's soulmate and discovers her secret when she drops her ring. Vasundhara falls in love at first sight, to the apprehension of Rukmini and Satyabhama, influencing the latter to lock the ring onto Vasundhara's finger.

Meanwhile, Narada encourages Mahodara to get married and reveals to him that Vasundhara is in Dwaraka, encouraging his conflict with Krishna and desire for Vasundhara. Krishna disguises himself as an old Brahmin and tells Mahodara that he is the father of Vasundhara, who Krishna kidnaped after he proclaimed Mahodara to be his future son-in-law. Krishna continues to disguise himself as Vasundhara and later Kalayavana to instigate Mahodara.

In Dwaraka, Krishna lulls Satyabhama to sleep, steals the key, frees Vasundhara, and the two romance in the garden. Satyabhama wakes up to find the key gone and discovers the affair in the garden. Parallelly, Mahodara provokes Paundraka Vasudeva, a king who believes himself to be the real Krishna, who then imprisons and tortures Kuchela and his family, who refuse to believe he is their lord. Krishna hears his friend's pleas and heads to Pundra to defeat Vasudeva.

The furious Satyabhama then imprisons Vasundhara, who also pleas for her lover's help. After being torn between the two, Krishna decides to go to Pundra and kills Vasudeva. Mahodara then attacks the defenseless Dwaraka and abducts Vasundhara. Krishna returns to Mahodara in the form of the Brahmin and enters Vasundhara's chambers revealing himself and his secret plan to save them.

On the wedding day, Krishna (as the Brahmin) acts frustrated at the clueless Mahodara, performing the wedding rituals as if frustratingly showing Mahodara. Finally, while Mahodara is distracted reciting a mantra, Krishna goes to his original form and ties the mangala sutra around Vasundhara's neck. Realizing the betrayal, Mahodara goes to attack Krishna, but is astonished when he places the ring on Vasundhara's finger, and she becomes a statue. Believing it to be some of Krishna's mischievous illusions, he takes the ring off and grabs Vasundhara. As foretold, the ring transforms into a large chakra and heads towards Mahodara, who is unafraid until Krishna reminds him that by taking off the ring, he, not another person, has unleashed the weapon, thus undefeated by Shiva's boon. Mahodara escapes with Vasundhara in his vimana, but is eventually beheaded while Vasundhara falls out and is caught by Krishna on the ground.

Krishna and Vasundhara return to Dwaraka where Narada reveals to Satyabhama, Rukmini, and Vasundhara that her creation and life was all a ploy to defeat and kill Mahodara, to the disappointment and confusion of Vasundhara. Krishna then reveals that although this was the plan, the two are linked eternally, as she is the avatar of Bhudevi, born as Vasundhara to defeat Mahodara.

== Cast ==
- N. T. Rama Rao as Lord Krishna
- Jayalalithaa as Vasundhara
- S. V. Ranga Rao as Mahodara & Kalayavana (dual role)
- Kanta Rao as Narada Maharshi
- Mikkilineni as Balarama
- Dhulipala as Muchukunda
- Rajanala as Lord Siva
- Satyanarayana
- Nagabhushanam as Paundraka Vasudeva
- Ramakrishna as Satyaki
- Prabhakar Reddy as Lord Brahma
- Padmanabham as Kudi Bhujam
- Allu Ramalingaiah as Vasanthaka
- Tyagaraju as Indra
- Jamuna as Satyabhama
- Devika as Rukmini
- Hema Malini as Rambha
- Rama Prabha as Goddess Saraswati
- Sandhya Rani as Lakshana
- Prasanna Rani as Chaturika
- Sriranjani Jr. as Vamakshi
- Jayasri as Jambavati

== Production ==
Though the film was primarily in black-and-white, few scenes were filmed in colour too. This was Ramarao's 210th film as an actor. The film's art director Madhavapeddi Gokhale made a sketch of "each and every set prior to execution". He put in similar background work for all jewelry and costumes too, matching them to the character being portrayed by the person who wears them. Hema Malini initially refused to act in this film as she was busy with Hindi films, but agreed after seeing the sketches of her character and listening to the song. She decided to spare five sundays for the song due to her busy schedule and did it within a month's time.

== Soundtrack ==
Music composed by Pendyala Nageswara Rao. The song "Joharu Sikhi Pincha Mouli" is based on Athana raga.

Song title	Lyrics	Singers	length
"Jayaho Nava Neela Megha Shyama"	Dasaradhi	Ghantasala	4:00
"Joharu"	C. Narayana Reddy	P. Susheela	5:28
"Haayi Haayi"	Pingali Nagendra Rao	P. Susheela	4:45
"Aadinchi Jananu"	Pingali Nagendra Rao	P. Susheela	2:53
"Je Jela Talliki"	Kondamacharya	P. Susheela, S. Janaki	4:27
"Pillana Grovi Pilupu"	C. Narayana Reddy	Ghantasala, P. Susheela	5:22
"Krishna Premamaya"	Acharya Aatreya	Ghantasala, P. Susheela	4:20

naa jeevithamu nee kankithamu

Ghantasala suseela
