= Suma Kanakala =

Indian television anchor

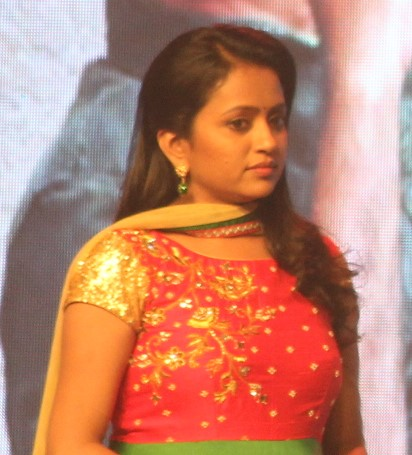
- Suma in 2015
- Born: Pallassana Paachuveettil Suma Menon; 22 March 1975 (age 51); Palakkad, Kerala, India
- Occupations: Television presenter; Producer; Actress
- Years active: 1991–present
- Television: Star Mahila
- Spouse: Rajeev Kanakala (m. 1999)
- Children: 2

Suma Kanakala (née Pallassana Paachuveettil; born on 22 March 1975) is an Indian television presenter, actress, and producer who predominantly works in Telugu television and cinema. She is widely recognized for hosting Star Mahila, a game show on ETV that holds the distinction of being India's longest-running TV game show, with a successful run of exactly 12 years.

== Early life ==
Suma was born on 22 March 1975 in Palakkad, Kerala, into a Malayali Nair family. She is the only child of Pranavi Narayanan Kutty Nair and Pallassana Paachuveettil Vimala, born ten years after her parents' marriage. When she was six months old, the family moved to Secunderabad, Andhra Pradesh (now in Telangana), due to her father's employment with the Indian Railways.

Suma spent her formative years in the Lalaguda and Mettuguda areas of Secunderabad. She completed her education at St. Ann's High School in Lalaguda and Mettuguda and pursued her undergraduate studies at Railway Degree College in Lalaguda.

== Career ==
A presenter aged 16, she has hosted many Telugu film audio launches, film awards and functions. She is a Malayali from Kerala, but speaks Telugu fluently. She has acted in various serial and telefilms since 1995, her breakthrough came with the boom in satellite channels. Swayamvaram, Anveshitha, Geethanjali, and Ravoyi Chandamama were her major dramas. She didn't have any interest in working in films.

Suma's flagship show is Star Mahila on ETV, which attracted many female audiences. She created a record by this show becoming one of the longest running women game show in India. Suma started her own production house named K. Suma Rajeev Creations on 26 December 2012 and has produced a show named Lakku Kikku which was telecasted on Zee Telugu. She also worked in a show named Genes on ETV. Her Kevvu Keka on MAA TV with co-star Mano and produced by K. Suma Rajeev Creations. Suma also sang "Suya Suya" song from the 2017 Telugu film Winner. She is well known for her spontaneous and humorous remarks during her shows.

== Personal life ==
She married Tollywood actor, Rajeev Kanakala on 10 February 1999 in Hyderabad. They have two children, Roshan Karthik Kanakala and Manaswini Kanakala. In addition to her mother tongue of Malayalam, she is fluent in Telugu, Hindi, Tamil, and English.

== Filmography ==
=== Film ===
Year	Title	Role	Language	Notes
1996	Kalyana Praapthirasthu		Telugu	
1997	Newspaper Boy	Sita	Malayalam	
1997	Ishtadanam	Anitha Varma	Malayalam	
1998	Oro Viliyum Kathorthu	Subhadra	Malayalam	
1998	Pavitra Prema	Swapna	Telugu	
2000	Chala Bagundi	Vijayalakshmi	Telugu	
2001	Pandanti Samsaram		Telugu	
2001	Kalisi Naduddam	Vijaya's friend	Telugu	
2002	Raghava		Telugu	
2002	Joruga Husharuga	Kanchana's sister	Telugu	
2004	Varsham	Venkat's sister	Telugu	
2004	Swarabhishekam	News reporter	Telugu	
2005	Premikulu	Herself	Telugu	
2007	Dhee	Shankar Goud's henchman's wife	Telugu	
2013	Baadshah	Herself	Telugu	
2019	Oh! Baby	TV Anchor (only on television)	Telugu	
2022	Jayamma Panchayathi	Jayamma	Telugu	
2025	Premante	Asha Mary	Telugu	

==== Playback singer ====
- Winner (2017) - "Suyaa Suyaa"

== Television ==
Year	Title	Role	Network	Language	Notes
1994–1995	Amaravathi ki Kathayein		DD National	Hindi	
1997–1999	Anveshitha	Clara	ETV	Telugu	
	Matti Manishi			Telugu	
	Veyi Padagalu			Telugu	
	Swayamvaram			Telugu	
	Geetanjali			Telugu	
2007–2021	Star Mahila		ETV	Telugu	Two seasons
	Avakkayyara	Host	MAA TV	Telugu	
	Lady Boss	Host	MAA TV	Telugu	
	Pattukunte Pattu Cheera	Host	Teja TV	Telugu	
	Panchavataram	Host	TV9	Telugu	
	Bhale Chance Le	Host	MAA TV	Telugu	
	Lakku Kikku	Host	Zee Telugu	Telugu	Also producer
	Gemini Puraskaaralu	Host	Gemini TV	Telugu	Television special
	Kevvu Keka	Host	MAA TV	Telugu	
2012–2013	CineMAA Awards	Host	MAA TV	Telugu	Television special
	Swarabhishekam	Host	ETV	Telugu	
	Soundarya Lahari	Host	ETV	Telugu	
	Pelli Choopulu	Host	Star Maa	Telugu	
	Genes	Host	ETV	Telugu	Two seasons
2015	Genes Season 1	Host	Zee Tamil	Tamil	
	E Junction	Host	ETV Plus	Telugu	
2017	Bigg Boss 1	Inspection officer	Star Maa	Telugu	
	Connexion	Host	Star Maa	Telugu	
	Sell Me The Answer	Host	Star Maa	Telugu	
	Wife Chethilo Life	Host	Star Maa	Telugu	
2018	Pelli Choopulu	Host	Star Maa	Telugu	
2018	Sixth Sense	Contestant	Star Maa	Telugu	
2019	F3 – Fun, Family & Frustration	Host	Star Maa	Telugu	
2018	Apsara Awards	Host	Zee Telugu	Telugu	Television special
	Big Celebrity Challenge	Host	Zee Telugu	Telugu	Season 3
2019	8th SIIMA 2019	Host	Gemini TV	Telugu	Television special
2020–2021	House of Hungama	Designer Devi	Star Maa	Telugu	
2019–2022	Cash	Host	ETV	Telugu	Two seasons
2020	All Is Well	Host		Telugu	
2021	Start Music	Host	Aha	Telugu	Season 3
2023–present	Suma Adda	Host	ETV	Telugu	

== Awards ==
- Nandi Award for Best TV Anchor 2010 – Panchavataram
- Limca Fresh Face Award 2009
- Local TV Media Awards Best Anchor – Star Mahila (2010)
- Cinegoer Award Best Anchor – Star Mahila (2010)
- Got placed in Limca Book of World Records for successful completion of Star Mahila's 2000 episodes.
- Apsara Awards 2018: Entertainer of the year
