= Velugu Needalu (1999 film) =

Indian Telugu-language romantic drama film

- Theatrical release poster
- Directed by: Mourya
- Produced by: M. S. Reddy; T. Subbarami Reddy (presents)
- Starring: Meena; Venkat; Jayaprada; Bhanu Chander; Suresh; Maheswari; M. S. Reddy
- Cinematography: C. Vijay Kumar
- Edited by: K. V. Krishna Reddy
- Music by: Srilekha
- Production company: Sabdalaya Theatres
- Release date: 20 February 1999
- Country: India
- Language: Telugu

Velugu Needalu (transl. Light and shadows) is a 1999 Indian Telugu-language romantic drama film directed by Mourya and starring an ensemble cast featuring Meena, Venkat, Jayaprada, Bhanu Chander, Suresh, Maheswari and producer M. S. Reddy. The film was a remake of the Gujarati film Desh Re Joya Dada Pardesh Joya (1998) and was a box office failure.

== Cast ==
- Meena as Radha
- Venkat as Gopi
- Jayaprada
- Bhanu Chander
- Suresh as Rajesh
- Maheswari
- M. Balayya
- Gollapudi Maruti Rao as Basavaiah
- Babloo Prithviraj as Avinash
- Narasimha Raju
- Brahmanandam
- Babu Mohan
- Jeeva
- Gundu Hanumantha Rao
- M. S. Reddy as Parandhamaiah
- Krishnaveni as Basavaiah's wife

== Production ==
The film was shot at Rama Naidu Cine Village.

== Music ==
The music was composed by M. M. Srilekha with lyrics by M. S. Reddy.

Track listing
| No. | Title | Singer(s) | Length |
|---|---|---|---|
| 1. | "Viswamantha Nindi Unna" | Mano |
| 2. | "Oogave Oogave Uyyala" | M. M. Srilekha | 2:03 |
| 3. | "Alli Billi Aatalatho" | S. P. Balasubrahmanyam, K. S. Chithra | 4:09 |
| 4. | "Ennallaku Vacchadamma" | S. P. Balasubrahmanyam, K. S. Chithra | 4:04 |
| 5. | "Pellikimunde Siggantha" | M. M. Srilekha, S. P. Swethanaga | 5:40 |
| 6. | "Attavaarinta" | Mano |
| 7. | "Gopaludalanaadu" | K. S. Chithra, S. P. Swethanaga | 1:49 |
| 8. | "Okka Kshanam" | Mano, M. M. Srilekha | 3:22 |
| 9. | "Mamatallerugani Kalama" | S. P. Balasubrahmanyam, K. S. Chithra |
| 10. | "Egurutunna Endi Mabbuki" | S. P. Balasubrahmanyam, K. S. Chithra | 4:40 |
| 11. | "Idi Adi Anthamleni Katha" | Mano |
| 12. | "Bhavya Charitaga" | M. M. Srilekha | 1:13 |

== Reception ==
Griddaluru Gopalrao of Zamin Ryot wrote that the story takes good turn here and there and is full of suspense and is interesting.
