= Aahuthi =

1987 Telugu film by Kodi Ramakrishna

- DVD cover
- Directed by: Kodi Ramakrishna
- Written by: Ganesh Patro (dialogues)
- Screenplay by: Kodi Ramakrishna
- Story by: Sreenivasa Chakravarthy
- Based on: Rajavinte Makan (1986)
- Produced by: Shyam Prasad Reddy
- Starring: Rajasekhar; Jeevitha
- Music by: Satyam
- Production company: M. S. Art Movies
- Release date: 3 December 1987
- Country: India
- Language: Telugu

Aahuthi is a 1987 Indian Telugu-language action drama film directed by Kodi Ramakrishna. The film stars Rajasekhar and Jeevitha in the lead roles. It was produced by Shyam Prasad Reddy on M. S. Art Movies banner. The music for the film was composed by Satyam. The film was a commercial success. It is a remake of Malayalam film Rajavinte Makan (1986), which itself was based on the 1980 novel Rage of Angels by Sidney Sheldon.

== Plot ==
The film tells the story of Sambhu Prasad (Gopi), a politician who manipulates situations for his gain. Ashok (Rajashekhar), a businessman, exposes Sambhu's corruption, which leads to a series of conflicts. Sambhu exploits Santhi (Jeevitha) for his political strategies, but she remains independent and resilient. The narrative explores themes of power, corruption, and the fight for justice.

== Cast ==
- Rajasekhar as Ashok
- Jeevitha as Santhi
- Babu Mohan
- Gopi as Sambhu Prasad
- Prasad

== Production ==
After the success of Talambralu (1986), Shyam Prasad Reddy produced Aahuthi directed by Kodi Ramakrishna. Rajasekhar initially believed the film had potential but did not anticipate its significant success. The praise he received for his role as Ashok surpassed his expectations.

During filming, Rajasekhar faced health challenges but was committed to his role. Director Kodi Ramakrishna guided him in portraying Ashok's character effectively, which helped audiences connect with the character. Rajasekhar later mentioned that the role deeply affected him, influencing his thoughts and sleep during filming. Although he initially felt unsatisfied with his performance, both audiences and critics praised his portrayal, providing him with a sense of fulfillment.

== Music ==
All music is composed by Satyam.

Track list
| No. | Title | Singer(s) | Length |
|---|---|---|---|
| 1. | "Andhamaina Naa" | S. P. Balasubrahmanyam |
| 2. | "Chebutha Neeko Vinta Katha" | S. P. Balasubrahmanyam |
| 3. | "Buddhudu Puttina" | V. Ramakrishna |
| 4. | "Sooridu Toorupuna" | S. Janaki |
| 5. | "Padagalettina Duragatanki" |

== Reception ==
Aahuthi was released on 3 December 1987 and became a major success at the box office. The film was noted for its powerful dialogues written by Ganesh Patro, which were considered one of its main assets. Rajasekhar's intense performance in the role of Ashok garnered widespread acclaim and is considered one of the defining roles of his career.

== Legacy ==
The film is remembered as one of Rajasekhar's significant early successes and a turning point in his career. The character of Ashok remains one of his most memorable roles, and the film's success solidified his reputation as an action hero in the Telugu film industry.

The film also introduced Prasad, who played the antagonist and later became popularly known as 'Ahuthi' Prasad. His role in Aahuthi had a significant impact on his career, leading to a notable number of police roles in his subsequent films.

Jeevitha, who played Rajasekhar's co-star, took care of him after he was injured on set. This incident not only deepened their personal relationship but also demonstrated Jeevitha's affection for Rajasekhar, which later led to their marriage.
