= Ahuti Prasad =

Indian actor (1958–2015)

- Born: Adusumilli Janardhan Vara Prasad; 2 January 1958; Koduru, Andhra Pradesh, India
- Died: 4 January 2015 (aged 57); Hyderabad, Telangana, India
- Occupation: Actor
- Years active: 1986 - 2015 (death)
- Spouse: Vijaya Nirmala
- Children: 2

Ahuti Prasad (born Adusumilli Janardhan Vara Prasad; 2 January 1958 – 4 January 2015) was an Indian actor who worked in Telugu film industry. He was renowned for the wide variety of roles he played, including father-figure, comedian, and antagonist. Prasad appeared in over 150 films in his career spanning nearly three decades. He got his moniker "Ahuti" after playing the antagonist in the film Aahuthi (1988). He is a recipient of two Nandi Awards.

== Early life and family ==
Ahuti Prasad was born on 2 January 1958 as Adusumilli Janardhan Vara Prasad to A. Ranga Rao and Hymavathi. Originally from Koduru of Krishna District near Mudinepally, his family migrated to Raichur in Karnataka when he was a child. He became interested in acting during his college days and sought a career as an actor. However, his parents were firmly against him pursuing a career in acting - he therefore completed his bachelor's degree before taking their permission to join a film institute. After completing his education, Prasad moved to Hyderabad and joined the Film Institute of veteran director V. Madhusudhana Rao. Devadas Kanakala was the principal of the institute during this time, while Ramjagan and the late Achyuth were his classmates there.

Prasad married Vijaya Nirmala with whom he had two sons - Karthik and Bharani.

== Career ==
"I’ve worked over 20 years in the industry, seen many ups and downs but this phase is something beautiful, I’m enjoying every bit of it." - Ahuti Prasad, in a 2009 interview, reflecting on Telugu cinema's transition to more modern, contemporary films and characters.

Prasad's career started with the film Vikram directed by V. Madhusudhana Rao which was Nagarjuna's debut film. Prasad also worked as an assistant director for V. Madhusudana Rao for the film Malle Moggalu.

Producer Shyam Prasad saw him on the sets of the film Ee Prasnaku Baduledi? where he was working and offered him a role as the antagonist in his film Aahuthi (1988). Because of the big break the film gave him, he came to be known popularly as Ahuti Prasad. Prasad expressed that Krishna Vamsi's Ninne Pelladata was key in pushing his career as a character artist, and that his success in the film ended up flooding him with offers.

In 2003, he won the Nandi Award for Best Villain for the film Nenu Ninnu Premistunnanu. In 2008 he won a Nandi Award for Best Character Actor for the film Chandamama, in which he played an alcoholic landlord. Prasad was praised for his mastery of the Telugu accent specific to the East and West Godavari districts, a trait he demonstrated in many roles throughout his career. He began his career with antagonist roles, but gradually transitioned to other shades throughout his career. Prasad was renowned for playing the role of a character's father-figure in many films like Malliswari, Bendu Apparao RMP, Kotha Bangaru Lokam, and Seethamma Vaakitlo Sirimalle Chettu.

Prasad believed that "character artistes do get to do more experimental and challenging roles," citing that "character artistes survive on such [unique] characters." Actor Allari Naresh, who worked with Prasad in numerous films, remarked that Prasad "used to do a lot of homework on the background of his character in a movie" and that he "always thinks of others' welfare along with his [own] welfare."

== Other works ==
Ahuti Prasad served as the general secretary of Movie Artistes Association (MAA). Murali Mohan, then President of the MAA, commented on Prasad, expressing that Prasad's "main concern used to be the welfare of the small artists in Telugu Film Industry."

== Death ==
Prasad died 4 January 2015 while undergoing treatment for colon cancer at KIMS hospital. His condition was widely unknown until his final days. Murali Mohan mentioned that Prasad "didn’t like to meet anyone during his last days because cancer made his condition very pitiable."

His body was taken to his home in Film Nagar, where numerous film personalities paid their respects. His last rites were performed at the Erragadda cremation ground. Prasad passed before seeing the release of his last three films.

== Filmography ==
=== Telugu ===
==== Films ====
1. Vikram (1986)
2. Malle Moggalu (1986)
3. Ee Prashnaku Baduledi (1986)
4. Yugakartalu (1987)
5. Prana Snehitulu (1988)
6. Aahuthi (1988)
7. Simha Swapnam (1989)
8. Gudachari 117 (1989) as Vinod
9. Two Town Rowdy (1989)
10. Mamathala Kovela (1989)
11. Ayyappa Swamy Mahatyam (1989)
12. Muddula Mavayya (1989)
13. Aarthanadham (1989) as Inspector
14. Palnati Rudraiah (1989) as S.I. Raghavendra Rao
15. Kondaveeti Rowdy (1990)
16. Justice Rudramadevi (1990)
17. Papa Kosam (1990)
18. Balachandrudu (1990)
19. Police Bharya (1990)
20. Shanti Kranti (1991)
21. Assembly Rowdy (1991)
22. Maha Yagnam (1991)
23. Nayakuralu (1991)
24. Killer (1992)
25. Gharana Mogudu (1992)
26. Nani (1992)
27. Repati Rowdy (1993)
28. Kalachakram (1993)
29. Teerpu (1994)
30. Raithu Bharatam (1994)
31. Super Police (1994)
32. Maatho Pettukoku (1995)
33. Deyyam (1996)
34. Ninne Pelladata (1996)
35. Preminchukundam Raa (1997)
36. Sindhooram (1997)
37. Bobbili Dora (1997)
38. Anaganaga Oka Roju (1997)
39. Sri Sita Ramula Kalyanam Chootamu Raarandi (1998)
40. Ganesh (1998)
41. Snehithulu (1998)
42. Choodalani Vundi (1998)
43. Shrimati Vellosta (1998)
44. Swayamvaram (1999) as Police Official
45. Samarasimha Reddy (1999)
46. Seetharama Raju (1999)
47. Sooryavansham (1999)
48. Kalisundam Raa (2000)
49. Jayam Manade Raa (2000)
50. Devi Putrudu (2001) as Elchuri
51. Budget Padmanabham (2001)
52. Ramma Chilakamma (2001)
53. Chiranjeevulu (2001)
54. Apparaoki Oka Nela Thappindi (2001)
55. Nuvvu Nenu (2001)
56. Cheppalani Vundhi (2001)
57. Veedekkadi Mogudandi! (2001)
58. Ammaye Navvithe (2001)
59. Muthyam (2001)
60. Nuvvu Leka Nenu Lenu (2002)
61. Aadi (2002)
62. Allari Ramudu (2002)
63. Santosham (2002)
64. Seema Simham (2002)
65. Lagna Patrika (2002)
66. Indra (2002)
67. Gemeni (2002)
68. Chennakesava Reddy (2002)
69. Dhanalakshmi, I Love You (2002)
70. Nenu Pelliki Ready (2003)
71. Vasantham (2003)
72. Seetayya (2003)
73. Tagore (2003)
74. Palnati Bramhanaidu (2003)
75. Okariki Okaru (2003)
76. Janaki Weds Sriram (2003)
77. Chantigadu (2003)
78. Lakshmi Narasimha (2004)
79. Malliswari (2004)
80. Venky (2004)
81. Samba (2004)
82. Shiva Shankar (2004)
83. Gowri (2004)
84. Shankar Dada M.B.B.S. (2004)
85. Manasu Maata Vinadhu (2005)
86. Pandem (2005)
87. Bunny (2005)
88. Chakram (2005)
89. Sri (2005)
90. Gowtam SSC (2005)
91. Mr. Errababu (2005)
92. Athanokkade (2005)
93. Premikulu (2005)
94. Nayakudu (2005)
95. Allari Pidugu (2005)
96. Danger (2005)
97. Oka V Chitram (2006)
98. Lakshmi (2006)
99. Asadhyudu (2006)
100. Chukkallo Chandrudu (2006)
101. Pellaina Kothalo (2006)
102. Seetaramudu (2006)
103. Samanyudu (2006)
104. Manasu Palike Mouna Raagam (2006)
105. Desamuduru (2007)
106. Chandamama (2007)
107. Lakshyam (2007)
108. Viyyalavari Kayyalu (2007)
109. Veduka (2007)
110. Aata (2007)
111. Yamagola Malli Modalayindi (2007)
112. Madhumasam (2007)
113. Nava Vasantham (2007)
114. Baladoor (2008)
115. Homam (2008)
116. Gunde Jhallumandi (2008)
117. Gajibiji (2008)
118. Siddu From Sikakulam (2008)
119. Bujjigadu (2008)
120. Pourudu (2008)
121. Naa Style Veru (2008)
122. Kotha Bangaru Lokam (2008)
123. Ekaloveyudu (2008)
124. Sasirekha Parinayam (2009)
125. Adhineta (2009)
126. Mitrudu (2009)
127. Naa Girlfriend Baga Rich (2009)
128. Arundhathi (2009)
129. Ride (2009)
130. Boni (2009)
131. Aa Intlo (2009)
132. Mahatma (2009)
133. Anjaneyulu (2009)
134. Bendu Apparao R.M.P (2009)
135. Rechipo (2009)
136. Saradaga Kasepu (2010)
137. Brindaavanam (2010)
138. Okka Kshanam (2010)
139. Shambo Shiva Shambo (2010)
140. Baava (2010)
141. Kalyanram Kathi (2010)
142. Kathi Kantha Rao (2010)
143. Chalaki (2010)
144. Varudu (2010)
145. Bindaas (2010)
146. Leader (2010)
147. Darling (2010)
148. Jhummandi Naadam (2010)
149. Em Pillo Em Pillado (2010)
150. Police Police (2010)
151. Wanted (2011)
152. Aha Naa Pellanta (2011)
153. Nenu Naa Rakshasi (2011)
154. Nagaram Nidrapotunna Vela (2011)
155. Daggaraga Dooramga(2011)
156. Madatha Kaja (2011)
157. Oosaravelli (2011)
158. Bejawada (2011)
159. Mr. Nookayya (2012)
160. Naa Ishtam (2012)
161. Lovely (2012)
162. Dammu (2012)
163. Dhamarukam (2012)
164. Srimannarayana (2012)
165. Sevakudu (2013)
166. NRI (2013)
167. Seethamma Vakitlo Sirimalle Chettu (2013)
168. Priyathama Neevachata Kushalama (2013)
169. Ongole Githa (2013)
170. Mr. Pellikoduku (2013)
171. Jaffa (2013)
172. Gunde Jaari Gallanthayyinde (2013)
173. Greeku Veerudu (2013)
174. Om 3D (2013)
175. Abbai Class Ammai Mass (2013)
176. Atharintiki Daaredi (2013)
177. Doosukeltha (2013)
178. Bhimavaram Bullodu (2014)
179. Hrudayam Ekkadunnadi (2014)
180. Legend (2014)
181. Amrutham Chandamamalo (2014)
182. Autonagar Surya (2014)
183. Pilla Nuvvu Leni Jeevitam (2014)
184. Kotha Janta (2014)
185. Rowdy Fellow (2014)
186. Rudramadevi (2015) (posthumous release)
187. Janda Pai Kapiraju (2015) (posthumous release)
188. Shankara (2016) (posthumous release)
189. Deyyam (2021) (posthumous release and final role)

==== Television ====
- Lady Detective (1995)

=== Tamil ===
- Varapogum Sooriyane (2005)
- Vettaiyaadu Vilaiyaadu (2006)
- Nimirndhu Nil (2014)

=== Hindi ===
- Sooryavansham (1999)

=== Assistant director ===
- Malle Moggalu (1986)

== Awards ==
Year	Award	Category	Film	Result
2002	Nandi Awards	Best Villain	Nenu Ninnu Premistunnanu	Won
2007	Nandi Awards	Best Character Actor	Chandamama	Won
