= Pratibandh =

- Film poster
- Directed by: Ravi Raja Pinisetty
- Written by: Anees Bazmee
- Based on: Ankusam
- Produced by: Allu Aravind
- Starring: Chiranjeevi; Juhi Chawla; Rami Reddy
- Cinematography: K. S. Hari
- Edited by: Vellaiswamy
- Music by: Laxmikant–Pyarelal
- Distributed by: Geetha Arts
- Release date: 28 September 1990 (India)
- Country: India
- Language: Hindi

Pratibandh is a 1990 Hindi-language action film directed by Ravi Raja Pinisetty and starring Chiranjeevi, Juhi Chawla and Rami Reddy. The film marked the Hindi debut of leading Telugu film star Chiranjeevi. Chawla received a Best Actress nomination at the 36th Filmfare Awards for her performance in the film. The film is a remake of the 1989 Telugu film Ankusam. It was commercially successful.

== Plot ==
Siddhantha (Chiranjeevi) is an honest police officer who learns that an assassin named "Spot" Nana (Rami Reddy) is assigned to kill his former mentor-turned-CM Satyendra Sharma (J. V. Somayajulu) and thwarts Nana's assassination attempts. Enraged, Nana kills Siddhantha's wife, Shanti (Juhi Chawla), who was a former witness to Nana's crimes. In a last attempt to save Satyendra, Siddhantha finally kills Nana and proves to Satyendra that an assassination attempt was made by lighting the torch (the torch was supposed to be lit by Satyendra), rigged with explosives. Siddhantha dies in the explosion after requesting Satyendra to make the former's son a police officer.

== Cast ==
- Chiranjeevi as Siddhantha
- Juhi Chawla as Shanti
- Rami Reddy as "Spot" Nana
- Harish Patel as Katkar
- J. V. Somayajulu as CM Satyendra Sharma
- Kulbhushan Kharbanda as Home Minister
- Shafi Inamdar as Corrupt Police Official
- Reema Lagoo as Judge
- Sumalatha as Naseem
- Allu Sirish as Student

== Soundtrack ==
1. "Kabhi Hua Nahi Kabhi Dekha Nahi" - Amit Kumar, Alka Yagnik
2. "Pyar Mujhe Tum Karte Ho Itna" - Alka Yagnik, Amit Kumar
3. "Baccho Bajao Tali Aayi Khilone Wali" - Alka Yagnik
4. "Yeh Badnaseeb Bachcha" - Mohammad Aziz

== Awards ==
36th Filmfare Awards:

Nominated

- Best Film – Allu Aravind
- Best Director – Ravi Raja Pinisetty
- Best Actor – Chiranjeevi
- Best Actress – Juhi Chawla
- Best Supporting Actor – Rami Reddy
