= Bharat Bandh =

- Directed by: Kodi Ramakrishna
- Produced by: A. Subhash
- Starring: Vinod Kumar; Archana; Rahman; Kolla Ashok Kumar; Costumes Krishna
- Music by: Vijaya Shekhar
- Release date: 1991
- Country: India
- Language: Telugu

Bharat Bandh is a 1991 Telugu political thriller film directed by Kodi Ramakrishna and produced by A. Subhash. The film stars Vinod Kumar, Archana, Rahman and Costumes Krishna in the lead roles. The music was composed by Vijaya Shekhar.

== Cast ==
- Vinod Kumar
- Archana
- Rahman
- Kolla Ashok Kumar
- Costumes Krishna

== Soundtrack ==
- "Deshamitta Tagaladipotundi"
- "Bharat Bandh Voice"
- "Tappu Ledu Oppu Ledu"
- "Swatantra Bharatam"
- "Idenaa Jaati Pragati"
