= Ramayanam (1997 film) =

- Poster
- Directed by: Gunasekhar
- Based on: Ramayanam by Valmiki
- Produced by: M. S. Reddy
- Dialogue by: M. V. S. Haranatha Rao
- Starring: N. T. Rama Rao Jr. Smitha Madha; Swathi Kodali
- Cinematography: Sekhar V. Joseph
- Edited by: B. B. Reddy
- Music by: Songs: Madhavapeddi Suresh; Score: L. Vaidyanathan
- Production company: Shabdhalaya Theaters
- Release date: 11 April 1997
- Running time: 144 minutes
- Country: India
- Language: Telugu

Ramayanam, also known as Bala Ramayanam (transl. Child Ramayanam), is a 1997 Indian Telugu-language mythological film directed by Gunasekhar and produced by M. S. Reddy. Based on the Hindu epic Ramayana, the film features overs 3000 child actors. It stars N. T. Rama Rao Jr. as Lord Rama Smitha Madhav as Sita Swathi Kodali as Ravanasura, won the Nandi Award for Best Child Actor.

The film is released on 11 April 1997. It received the National Film Award for Best Children's Film and two Nandi Awards.

== Plot ==
The story deals with lord Rama and his retaliation against Ravana for the kidnapping of his wife goddesses Sita.

== Cast ==
- N. T. Rama Rao Jr. as Rama
- Smitha Madhav as Sita
- Narayanam Nikhil as Lakshmana
- Swathi Kodali as Ravana
- Arun Gangadhar as Anjaneya
- Aanand Vardhan as Valmiki and Bala Anjaneya
- Aditya Varma as Dasharatha
- Chiranjeevi as Bharata
- Manisha Chudamani as Kausalya
- Vasundhara as Kaikeyi
- Suma as Sumitra
- Svetha Rao as Urmila
- Sunaina as Shabari
- Sudha Gummadi as Sudha

== Production ==
The film's cast features over 3000 child actors.

== Soundtrack ==
The music was composed by Madhavapeddi Suresh.

Songs:

1. "Adi Subhodaya Vela" - S. P. Balasubrahmanyam
2. "Virisi Viriyani Malliyalara" - K. S. Chithra
3. "Sitaramula Kalyanam " - S. Janaki, Vani Jayaram
4. "Ramayya Rajavutadanta" - Vani Jayaram, S.P. Sailaja
5. "Purajanula Sambaramu" - S. P. Balasubrahmanyam
6. "Entha Manchivadivayya" -Vani Jayaram
7. "Andabayani Jantaga" - K. J. Yesudas, K. S. Chithra
8. "Budi Budi Adigulu"
9. "Adigadigo Modalayindi" - S. P. Balasubrahmanyam

Poems:

1. "Aa Surya Bhagavanudu" - B. Sai Karthikeya
2. "Hari Hari Entha Maata"
3. "Vande Sri Raghuvamsa"
4. "Gaduvu Lopala"
5. "Aagumaagumu Talli"
6. "Nanu Talliga "
7. "Dharma Samsthapanarthammu"
8. "Poulastya Brahmaga" - B. Sai Karthikeya
9. "Vinumo Raghava"
10. "Ramayanammu" - Mangalampalli Balamuralikrishna

Slokas:

1. "Jata Kataha Sambhrama" (from Shiva Tandava Stotram)
2. "Kausalya Supraja Rama" (from Suprabhatam/Valmiki Ramayana) - Mangalampalli Balamuralikrishna
3. "Sri Anjaneyam" (from Anjaneya Dandakam)

== Critical response ==
Upon release, the film received positive reviews from critics. A critic from Andhra Today wrote that "The novelty of this movie is that all the characters in the movie are played by children. Director Gunasekhar, with just two movies to his credit, has vindicated the confidence reposed in him by the producer by this spectacular theatrical. He must have needed all his skills to create the visual extravaganza, that the picture is made to be, with a story that has been told by many, many a time. He deserves kudos for his competent handling of the long story into a three-hour movie".

== Awards ==
The film received National Film Award for Best Children's Film in 1997 for "presenting the classical Indian epic in an entertaining narrative style with child actors playing all legendary characters with ease and nerve." Director Gunasekhar and producer M. S. Reddy were presented the award.

Nandi Awards

- Best Children's Film - Gold - M. S. Reddy
- Best Child Actress - Jr NTR, Swathi.
