= M. S. Reddy =

Indian film producer, lyricist, and screenwriter

- Born: Mallemala Sundara Rami Reddy; 15 August 1924 near Nellore, British India
- Died: 11 December 2011 (aged 87); Hyderabad, India
- Occupations: Film producer; lyricist; screenwriter
- Years active: 1962–2011
- Children: Shyam Prasad Reddy

Mallemala Sundararami Reddy (15 August 1924 – 11 December 2011), popularly known as M. S. Reddy and Mallemala, was an Indian film producer, lyricist, and screenwriter in Telugu cinema. Over his career, he produced more than 25 films, several of which received Nandi and National Awards. He penned over 5,000 songs and poems, earning the title "Sahaja Kavi" (The Natural Poet) for his simple and accessible writing style. In recognition of his significant contributions to cinema, he was honoured with the Raghupathi Venkaiah Award in 2005.

M. S. Reddy established the Kaumudi Pictures and M. S. Arts banners, under which he produced notable films like Sri Krishna Vijayam (1971), Kode Nagu (1974), Muthyala Pallaki (1977), Palnati Simham (1985), Aahuthi (1987), Ankusam (1989), Ammoru (1995), Baala Ramayanam (1997), and Arundhati (2009). Baala Ramayanam, featuring 3,000 child artistes, won the National Film Award for Best Children's Film.

M. S. Reddy played a key role in the relocation of the Telugu film industry from Madras to Hyderabad and founded Sabdalaya Studios, a prominent recording studio in Banjara Hills, Hyderabad. In addition to his contributions to filmmaking, Reddy held several leadership positions within the industry, including President of the Telugu Film Producers Council, the South Indian Film Writers Association, the Film Nagar Cooperative Housing Society, and as Chairman of the Andhra Pradesh Film Development Corporation.

== Early and personal life ==
Mallemala Sundararami Reddy was born in the village of Alimili, near Nellore. His date of birth is usually given as 15 August 1924. He was known for his outspoken nature. Aside from his work, M. S. Reddy was also a campaigner for various social causes and had Gandhian views. Film and television producer Shyam Prasad Reddy is his son.

== Career ==
=== Film production ===
M. S. Reddy began his career at a photographic studio in Madras (now Chennai). His first production was the Telugu-dubbed version of the Tamil film Kumari Penn (1966), released as Kanne Pilla in the same year. He also dubbed two other Tamil films, Parakkum Pavai (1966) and Panam Padaithavan (1965), as Kontepilla and Kalachakram respectively, both released in 1967.

He made his debut as a film producer with the 1968 Telugu film Bharya, starring Sobhan Babu, under the Kaumudi Pictures banner. Reddy went on to produce a series of notable films, including Sri Krishna Vijayam (1971) featuring N. T. Rama Rao, Kodenaagu (1974) with Sobhan Babu, and Mutyala Pallaki (1977), starring Narayana Rao and Jayasudha. His collaborations with actor Krishna resulted in films like Ekalavya (1982) and Palnati Simham (1985). Other significant productions included Aahuthi (1987), Ankusam (1989), and Baala Ramayanam (1997).

M. S. Reddy was instrumental in launching the career of Jr. NTR through the film Baala Ramayanam and contributed to the success of actor Rajasekhar by producing several of his films, including Ankusam, in which Reddy also portrayed the role of a chief minister.

=== Lyricist ===
As a lyricist, M. S. Reddy used his surname Mallemala as his pen name. He wrote over 5,000 songs and poems, earning the title "Sahaja Kavi" (The Natural Poet) for his simple and accessible writing style.

=== Sabdalaya Studios ===
In 1984, the Andhra Pradesh government allotted M. S. Reddy half an acre of land on Road No. 2, Banjara Hills, specifically for developing a recording and re-recording theatre. Reddy utilized this opportunity to establish Sabdalaya Studios, a prominent recording studio in the Telugu film industry.

== Autobiography ==
M. S. Reddy’s autobiography, Idhi Naa Kadha, caused a stir in the Telugu film industry with its critical remarks about prominent stars, leading to backlash, particularly from fans of N. T. Rama Rao (NTR) and N. T. Rama Rao Jr (Jr. NTR).

In the book, M. S. Reddy described N. T. Rama Rao's on-set tantrums during the filming of Sri Krishna Vijayam (1971), including an incident where Rama Rao was upset with actor Nagabhushanam’s costume, which resembled his own as Lord Krishna. Reddy explained that it took considerable effort to convince Rama Rao that Nagabhushanam was playing the role of Poundrika Vasudeva, a character who imitates Krishna.

M. S. Reddy also criticized Jr. NTR, whom he had introduced as Lord Rama in the film Bala Ramayanam (1997). Reddy recalled that Jr. NTR had initially promised to debut as a lead actor under his production house but instead debuted with Usha Kiran Movies. Despite this, Reddy continued to seek a collaboration, and Jr. NTR eventually agreed to work on his ninth film under Reddy’s banner. However, during a script meeting at M. S. Reddy’s office, T. Subbarami Reddy arrived unexpectedly. When M. S. Reddy asked Jr. NTR to wait while he met with Subbarami Reddy, Jr. NTR left, reportedly saying, "Who is M. S. Reddy to make me wait?"

The book also detailed a dispute between actresses Jamuna and Jayalalithaa on the set of Sri Krishna Vijayam. M. S. Reddy accused director Gunasekhar of betraying a promise to make the film Okkadu (2003) under Reddy’s banner. Gunasekhar responded by holding a press conference, dismissing the allegations as fabrications. Following the uproar, it was decided to withdraw the limited copy edition of the book.

== Death ==
M. S. Reddy died on 11 December 2011 at his residence in Film Nagar, Hyderabad, after a prolonged illness. He was 87 years old.

== Filmography ==
=== Producer/actor/presenter ===
- Bharya (1968)
- Kalasina Manasulu (1968)
- Sri Krishna Vijayam (1971)
- Ooriki Upakari (1972)
- Kode Nagu (1974)
- Ramaya Thandri (1975)
- Doralu Dongalu (1976)
- Mutyala Pallaki (1977)
- Nayudu Bava (1978)
- Rama Banam (1979)
- Thathayya Premaleelalu (1980)
- Bhola Shankarudu (1980)
- Ekalavya (1982)
- Kalyana Veena (1983)
- Palnati Simham (1985)
- Lady Doctor (1985)
- O Prema Katha (1987)
- Aahuthi (1987)
- Chupulu Kalasina Subhavela (1988)
- Ankusam (1989)
- Aagraham (1991)
- Ammoru (1995)
- Ramayanam (1997)
- Velugu Needalu (1999) (also actor)
- Vamsoddharakudu (2000)
- Andham (2001)
- Arundhati (2009)

Dubbed films

- Kannepilla (1966)
- Kontepilla (1967)
- Kalachakram (1967)

=== Writer ===
- Ooriki Upakari (1972)
- Ramaya Thandri (1975)
- Doralu Dongalu (1976)
- Nayudu Bava (1978)
- Rama Banam (1979)
- Thathayya Premaleelalu (1980)
- Ramayanam (1997)

=== Lyricist ===
- Sri Krishna Vijayam (1971)
- Kode Naagu (1974): "Sangamam Sangamam Anuraaga Sangamam"
- Ramaya Thandri (1974): "Malli Virisindi"
- Doralu Dongalu (1976): "Cheppalanukunnaanu, Doralevvaroo Dongalevvaroo Telusukunnaanu"
- Mutyala Pallaki (1976): "Sannajaajiki, Gunnamaamiki Pellli Kudhirindi", "Tellavaarakamundee Palle Lechindi"
- Thathayya Premaleelalu (1980): "Vennello Vinnanu Sannayi Geetam"
- Ekalavya (1982): All songs
- Kalyana Veena (1983): "Veguchukka Molichindi"
- Talambralu (1986)
- Chupulu Kalasina Subhavela (1988): "Chupulu Kalasina Subhavela"
- Puttinti Gauravam (1996)
- Velugu Needalu (1999) : All songs

== Awards ==
Nandi Awards

- Best Lyricist - Ankusam (1989)
- Best Childrens Film - Gold - Ramayanam (1997)

== See also ==
- Raghupathi Venkaiah Award
