= Parama Sivudu =

1991 Telugu film by G. Anil Kumar

- Directed by: G. Anil Kumar
- Produced by: N. Ramalingeswara Rao
- Starring: Krishna Ghattamaneni; Radha; Rami Reddy
- Cinematography: Sarath
- Music by: Raj-Koti
- Release date: 11 January 1991
- Country: India
- Language: Telugu

Parama Sivudu is a 1991 Indian Telugu revenge drama film directed by G. Anil Kumar starring Krishna Ghattamaneni, Radha, Rami Reddy, Archana, Ramya Krishna and Giribabu in the lead roles. Kannada actor Ramesh Aravind played a brief role as Raja. Raj-Koti composed the film's soundtrack.

== Plot ==
Sivayya, an orphaned young man, is liked by everyone in his village, Kotipalli. A government doctor who moves to this village accepts him as her brother. They live a happy life with Sivayya's wife Gowri. Buchalu, an evil landlord, kills a bank officer for protesting against him and later tries to immolate a senior officer who tries to dig out the truth. When the doctor saves him and finds out the truth she complains against Buchalu and his sidekicks - Papa Rao and Dattulu only for them to rape her, kill Gowri and put the blame on Sivayya who is put behind bars. Years later, he returns to seek vengeance from his enemies. But this time he has to convince his daughter, Sita, who believe him to be responsible for her mother's death. Eventually, he finds a solution and kills his enemies.

== Cast ==
- Krishna as Sivayya
- Radha as Gowri
- Rami Reddy as Buchalu
- Ramya Krishnan as Sita
- Archana as Doctor
- Giri Babu
- P. L. Narayana
- Babu Mohan
- Ramesh Aravind as Raja
- Radha Kumari
- Malliswari

== Release ==
Coinciding with the festival of Sankranti, Parama Sivudu released on 11 January failed with a run of 28 days in Hyderabad and 12 days in Vizag.
