= Nandi Award for Best Villain =

Indian film award

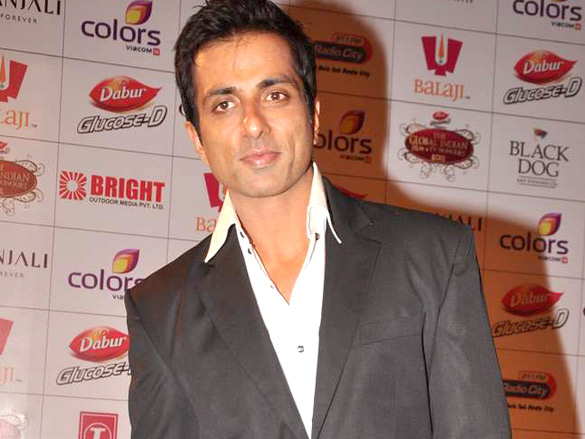
Actor Sonu Sood attending the Global Indian Film & TV Honors in 2012

This is the complete list of winners of Nandi Award for Best Villain since 1985, the year when the award in this category was instituted.

Year	Winner	Film
2016	Aadhi Pinisetty	Sarrainodu
2015	Rana Daggubati	Baahubali: The Beginning
2014	Jagapati Babu	Legend
2013	Sampath Raj	Mirchi
2012	Sudeepa	Eega
2011	Lakshmi Manchu	Anaganaga O Dheerudu
2010	Nagineedu	Maryada Ramanna
2009	Taraka Ratna	Amaravathi
2008	Sonu Sood	Arundhati
2007	Murali Sharma	Athidhi
2006	Sai Kumar	Samanyudu
2005	Sivaprasad	Danger
2004	Pradeep Rawat	Sye
2003	Prakash Raj	Gangotri
2002	Gopichand; Ahuti Prasad	Jayam; Nenu Ninnu Premistunnanu
2001	Kota Srinivasa Rao	Chinna
2000	Jaya Prakash Reddy	Jayam Manade Raa
1999	Tanikella Bharani	Samudram
1998	Kota Srinivasa Rao	Ganesh
1997	Babloo Prithiveeraj	Pelli
1996	Prakash Raj	Gunshot
1995	Srihari	Taj Mahal
1994	Kota Srinivasa Rao	Teerpu
1993	Kota Srinivasa Rao	Gaayam
1992	R.V. Prasad	Teja
1991	Nassar	Chanti
1990	Devaraj	Erra Mandaram
1989	Rami Reddy	Ankusam
1988	Nutan Prasad	Navabharatam
1987	Nutan Prasad	Praja Swamyam
1986	Dr. Rajasekhar	Talambralu
1985	Charan Raj	Pratighatana

== See also ==
- Nandi Awards
- Cinema of Andhra Pradesh
