= Ankusam =

- Official poster
- Directed by: Kodi Ramakrishna
- Story by: MS Arts Unit
- Produced by: Shyam Prasad Reddy
- Starring: Dr. Rajashekar; Jeevitha; Rami Reddy
- Cinematography: K. S. Hari
- Edited by: K. A. Marthand
- Music by: Satyam
- Production company: M. S. Art Movies
- Release date: July 1989
- Running time: 135 minutes
- Country: India
- Language: Telugu

Ankusam is 1989 Indian Telugu-language action film directed by Kodi Ramakrishna and produced by Shyam Prasad Reddy. The film stars Dr. Rajashekar and Jeevitha, with Rami Reddy and M. S. Reddy in supporting roles. It was a box-office blockbuster and marked a major breakthrough in Rajasekhar's career. The film won three Nandi Awards.

Ravi Raja Pinisetty directed the Hindi and Kannada remakes, Pratibandh and Abhimanyu, in 1990, featuring Chiranjeevi and V. Ravichandran, respectively.

== Premise ==
Vijay (Dr. Rajasekhar) is an honest police officer who learns that an assassin named Neelakantam (Rami Reddy) is assigned to kill his former mentor-turned-CM Master Raghuviah (M. S. Reddy) and sets out to thwart Neelakantam's plans.

== Cast ==
- Rajasekhar as Inspector Vijay
- Jeevitha as Parvati, Vijay's wife (Voice dubbed by Saritha)
- Rami Reddy as Neelakantam
- M. S. Reddy as CM Raghuviah Master
- Babu Mohan as Venkatarathnam
- Prasad Babu
- Ahuti Prasad as Circle Inspector (C.I.)

== Soundtrack ==
Song	Singer(s)	Lyrics
"Idi Cheragani Prema"	S. Janaki, S. P. Balasubrahmanyam	Mallemaala
"Goranta Deepam"	S. Janaki	Mallemaala
"Ayyaloo Jaagarata"	S. P. Balasubrahmanyam	Mallemaala
"Chinnaari Kasigandu" (dwepada)	S. P. Balasubrahmanyam	Mallemaala
"Nenu Tappu Cheyaledu"	S. P. Balasubrahmanyam	Mallemaala

== Legacy ==
The film became successful at box office and provided a major breakthrough in the career of Rajasekhar. Rajasekhar's portrayal of honest and short-tempered police officer received critical acclaim and he went on to be typecast in similar roles throughout his career. The film was dubbed and released in Tamil as Idhuthaanda Police, which also became a huge hit.

Both director and actor again teamed up for Nayakudu, which failed to repeat the success of Ankusam. Ramireddy also became famous as a villain and did similar characters in other films.

Director Srinu Vaitla said, "Two films – RGV's Shiva and Kodi's Ankusam – deeply influenced me and directly or indirectly prompted me to become a director".

== Awards ==
Nandi Awards - 1989

- Best Villain - Rami Reddy
- Second Best Story Writer - Shyam Prasad Reddy
- Best Lyricist - M. S. Reddy
