= Thathayya Premaleelalu =

- Theatrical release poster
- Directed by: B. V. Prasad
- Produced by: M. S. Reddy
- Starring: Chiranjeevi & Nutan Prasad
- Music by: Rajan–Nagendra
- Production company: Koumudi Arts
- Release date: 19 September 1980 (India)
- Country: India
- Language: Telugu

Thathayya Premaleelalu is a 1980 Telugu film starring Chiranjeevi.

== Plot ==
Nutan Prasad is a well respected gentleman in a village. Nutan Prasad's daughter dies leaving her daughter Geetha with him. He raises his nephew (Balayya) as his own son. Balayya establishes a business in Bombay and becomes wealthy. His kids who grow up in an ultra-modern culture. Nutan Prasad wants to get Balayya's elder son Anil (Chiranjeevi) married to his grand daughter Geetha.

When he goes to Bombay with the marriage proposal, he finds out that Chiru is no mood to marry a Village belle and that he has already been trapped in the net of an opportunistic girl, Seema. Nuthan Prasad poses as a rich old man and romances with Seema.

The money-minded Seema wants to marry the old man and leaves the frustrated Chiru in lurch. Once Chiru realizes what the real character of Seema is, he agrees to marry Geetha.

== Cast ==
- Chiranjeevi as Bhargav
- Geetha as Geetha
- Nutan Prasad
- Deepa
- Seema
- Kavitha
- Kaikala Satyanarayana
- Chakrapani
- Hari Prasad
- K. V. Chalam
- Balaiah
- Mada
- C.H. Krishna Murthy
- Arja Janardhana Rao
- Shubha
- Kalpana Rai
- Jayasheela
- Sadhana
- Athill Lakshmi
- Nirmalamma

== Release ==
The film was released on the same day as Chiranjeevi-starrer Kaali (1980).
