= House of Hungama =

Indian Telugu-language television series

- Poster
- Genre: Sitcom
- Directed by: Surendra
- Starring: Suma Kanakala; Sruthi; Hemanth; Raghava; Udaya Sree
- Country of origin: India
- Original language: Telugu
- No. of seasons: 1
- No. of episodes: 17

Production
- Producer: Suma Kanakala
- Running time: 22 minutes
- Production company: Jujube TV

Original release
- Network: Star Maa; Hotstar
- Release: 16 March 2020 – 3 January 2021

House of Hungama is Indian Telugu-language sitcom that debuted on Star Maa on 16 March 2020, directed by Surendra. The series stars Suma Kanakala, Sruthi, RJ Hemanth, Raghava and Udaya Sree in lead roles. The show went off air abruptly due to COVID-19 when shooting was stalled due to lockdown and restarted on 1 Jan 2021 and ended on 3 Jan 2021.

== Cast ==
- Suma Kanakala as Designer Devi : Arundhati's daughter in law, Ramakanth and Sameeksha's sister, Ranga brother's wife.
- Sruthi as Acidity Arundathi : Devi's and Ramakanth and Sameeksha's mother in law, Ranga's mother.
- Hemanth as Review Ranga
- Raghava as Engineer Ramakanth
- Udaya Sree as Sameeksha

== Development ==
Suma Kanakala returns to fiction after fifteen years to star in this sitcom for Star Maa which is produced by Suma's production house.

== Release ==
The first episode of the show was premiered on Star Maa on 16 March 2020, at 9.30-10 pm time slot which was also available on Hotstar on the same day. The show last aired on 2 April 2020 due to lockdown and went off air.

The show started airing again on 1 January 2021, with new episodes and ended on 3 January 2021.

=== Promotion ===
The first teaser was launched on 20 February 2020
