= Star Mahila =

Indian Game show

- Genre: Game show
- Presented by: Suma Kanakala
- Country of origin: India
- Original language: Telugu
- No. of seasons: 2
- No. of episodes: 3719

Production
- Running time: 40-45 minutes
- Production company: Mallemala Entertainments

Original release
- Network: ETV
- Release: January 1, 2007 – April 3, 2021

Star Mahila is an Indian Telugu-language game show for women, hosted by Suma Kanakala. The show airs on ETV at afternoons from 1.00-2.00 pm. It's the second longest Indian game show. Season 1 aired from 1 January 2006 to 7 June 2008 (titles as the game show “Mahilalu Maharanulu” for the first 400 episodes) and as ‘Star Mahila’ from 9 June 2008 to 26 January 2019, completing a total of 3181 episodes within a 12-year continuous run without an anchor/season/episode repeat. However, its second season was only premiered for barely 7–8 months from 17 August 2020 to 3 April 2021. It had two Super Star Mahila competitions held in two different times, but of the same season. They featured a selection of participants from various districts of all over Andhra Pradesh & Telangana. The winner of the first season (held from 20 November 2014 to 14 January 2015) was Sudha from Warangal district; whereas, the winner of Super Star Mahila 2 (held from 22 August-5 November 2016) was Teja Swaroopa from Rajahmundry of East Godavari, Andhra Pradesh

== Seasons ==
Season	Episodes	Originally broadcast (India)	
Season	Episodes	First aired	Last aired
1	3581	1 January 2007	26 January 2019
2	138	17 August 2020	3 April 2021

== Background ==
Female contestants participate in a fun game show consisting of a series of challenges in order to win attractive prizes. At the end of each episode, the anchor gives free gifts to the participants for their participation. In this show, a total of six players will participate in each episode. Initially, each participant will have zero points. The anchor will make the player play some fun games and ask questions. Clearing those, the participants will receive points. Finally the participant with the highest points wins the title of Star Mahila. Before Star Mahila, the game show was titled as “Mahilalu Maharanulu” for about two and half years and it featured a total of five participant per episode. Once Star Mahila show began the next day onwards, over six participants were featured until 2000 episodes of season 1; 4 participants between 2000-3000 episodes; and eight participants within one group from 3000+ episodes (a total of 18000+ participants). The second season involved four participants held in each episode, which included a series of normal as well as celebrity participants.

== Production ==
=== Season 1 ===
The show completed a consecutive run of 2000 episodes successfully on 23 January 2015 in which actors Pradeep, Ravi, Kaushik, Lasya, Shilpa Chakraborty and Rajeev Kanakala were the guests. Its 3000-episode celebration was held three years later on 6 April 2018. Suma Kanakala announced the ending of the longest-running women’s game show, sometime in September or October 2018. Star Mahila (again hosted by Suma Kanakala) featured a special farewell week 3 months later from 21 January 2019 to 26 January 2019 before returning to the second season one-and-a-half year later.

=== Season 2 ===
In July 2020, the show was confirmed while returning to a new season which premiered on 17 August 2020 and also hosted by Suma Kanakala. It ended on 3 April 2021, with a total of just 138 episodes. For the first four months, its season 2 was conducted only three days a week, from Monday to Wednesday. From new year 2021 onwards till the first week of April, Star Mahila was seen the usual six days a week (Monday to Saturday).

== Reception ==
The show completed its 3000th episode in April, 2018 after which it entered in the Limca Book of Records as the longest running women's game show hosted by a single anchor. It became her flagship show.

== See also ==
- List of longest running Indian Television Series
