= Suma Adda =

Indian talk show

- Genre: Talk-show; Variety show; Sketch comedy
- Directed by: Srinivas Bodem
- Presented by: Suma Kanakala
- Country of origin: India
- Original language: Telugu
- No. of seasons: 1

Production
- Producer: Mallemala Entertainments
- Camera setup: Multi-camera
- Running time: 44 minutes
- Production company: Mallemala Entertainments

Original release
- Network: ETV
- Release: 7 January 2023 – present

Related
- Cash

Suma Adda (transl. Suma's haunt) is an Indian Telugu-language television game show sketch comedy and variety talk show hosted by Suma Kanakala and produced by Mallemala Entertainments. Suma Adda premiered on ETV and ETV Win on 7 January 2023.

== Production and concept ==
Suma Adda replaced Cash 2.0 which was broadcast every Saturday at 9:00 p.m. Indian Standard Time. Later from the 74th episode, it is being telecast every Tuesday at 9:00 p.m. Indian Standard Time. The show has comedy sketches performed by various actors and games between the celebrity guests. From the fourteenth episode, the show was revamped as a game show with different segments, similar to Cash 2.0. There will be two teams competing against each other. The team that gets the highest cash prize by the end of the show, are declared as the winners. Each team can have multiple players/contestants.

== Episodes ==
=== 2023 ===
#	Premiere	Team 1	Team 2	Ref
1	7 January 2023	Santosh Sobhan, Priya Bhavani Shankar, Anil Kumar Aalla, Saddam		
2	14 January 2023	Chiranjeevi, Vennela Kishore, Bobby Kolli		
3	21 January 2023	Sekhar	Jani Master	
4	28 January 2023	Sudheer Babu	Bharat	
5	4 February 2023	Posani Krishna Murali	Ali	
6	11 February 2023	Nandamuri Kalyan Ram, Ashika Ranganath	Brahmaji, Rajendra Reddy	
7	18 February 2023	R. P. Patnaik, Saketh Komanduri	Raghu Kunche, Sri Krishna	
8	25 February 2023	Lavanya Tripathi, Kona Venkat	Siri Hanumanth, Raja Chembolu	
9	4 March 2023	Hema	Sameer, Giridhar	
10	11 March 2023	Priyadarshi Pulikonda, Racha Ravi	Venu Yeldandi, Kavya Kalyanram	
11	18 March 2023	Malvika Nair, Kalyani Malik	Srinivas Avasarala, Varanasi Soumya Chalamcharla	
12	25 March 2023	Nani, Srikanth Odela	Dheekshith Shetty, Kasarla Shyam	
13	1 April 2023	Roll Rida, Ariyana Glory	Tejaswi Madivada, Akhil Sarthak	
14	8 April 2023	Tanish, Samrat Reddy	Mehaboob, Amit Tiwari	
15	15 April 2023	Maheswari, Babloo Prithiveeraj	Akash, Sanghavi	
16	22 April 2023	Prudhvi Raj, Jyoti Labala	Prabhas Sreenu, Himaja	
17	29 April 2023	Gopichand, Getup Srinu	Dimple Hayathi, Sriwass	
18	6 May 2023	Akhil Akkineni	Sakshi Vaidya	
19	13 May 2023	B. V. Nandini Reddy, Malvika Nair	Vasuki Anand, Santosh Sobhan	
20	20 May 2023	Suhasini, Arjun Ambati	Amardeep Chowdary, Maheswari	
21	27 May 2023	Venu Yeldandi, Chammak Chandra	Dhanraj, Vishnu Priya Bhimeneni	
22	3 June 2023	Thiruveer, Pavani Karanam	Rana Daggubati, Rupak Ronaldson	
23	10 June 2023	Jackie Thota, Haritha Thota	Sai Kiran, Archana Ananth	
24	17 June 2023	Manas, Kavya Shree	Ravi Krishna, Shobha Shetty	
25	24 June 2023	Hari Teja, Mahesh Vitta	Ashu Reddy, Mahesh Achanta	
26	1 July 2023	Naga Shaurya, Yukti Thareja	Noel Sean, Pawan Basamsetti	
27	8 July 2023	Vaishnavi Chaitanya, Anand Devarakonda	Viraj Ashwin, Seetha	
28	15 July 2023 (Note: Additionally, K. Raghavendra Rao appeared on the show to promote Sarkaaru Noukari film, but didn't participate in the main game segments.)	Sunitha, Ganganamoni Shekar	Akash Goparaju, Bhavana Vazhapandal	
29	22 July 2023	Eesha Rebba, Ravi Varma	Gautami Challagulla, Jaswanth "Jessie"	
30	29 July 2023	VJ Sunny, RJ Kajal	Chalaki Chanti, Siri Hanumanth	
31	5 August 2023	Syed Sohel Ryan, Roopa Koduvayur	Ali Reza, Deepti Nallamothu	
32	12 August 2023	Sudharshan, Vidyullekha Raman	Abhinaya Krishna, Jordar Sujatha	
33	19 August 2023	Kartikeya Gummakonda, Neha Shetty	Srikanth Iyengar, Clax	
34	26 August 2023	Varun Tej	Praveen Sattaru, Sakshi Vaidya	
35	2 September 2023	Naveen Polishetty, Mahesh Achanta	Ariyana Glory, Shiva Jyothi	
36	9 September 2023	Aata Sandeep, Jyothi Raj	Natraj Master, Neetu	
37	16 September 2023	Kasthuri Shankar, Harikrishna	Indraneel, Meghana	
38	23 September 2023	Eknath, Jaya Harika	Rohit Sahni, Marina Abraham	
39	30 September 2023	Swathi Reddy, Naveen Chandra	Srikanth Nagothi, Ruchita Sadineni	
40	7 October 2023	Sudheer Babu, Mirnalini Ravi	Harsha Vardhan, Hari Teja	
41	14 October 2023	Sagar, Dhanya Balakrishna	Giridhar, Pandu	
42	21 October 2023	Rajendra Prasad, Gautami	Raj Madiraju, Racha Ravi	
43	28 October 2023	Mohana Bhogaraju, Saketh Komanduri	Sri Krishna, Faima	
44	4 November 2023	Raghu, Anee	Amma Rajasekhar, Bhanu	
45	11 November 2023	Ravi Kiran, Sushma, Prabhanjan	Vikram Aditya, Sreevani, Rajanandini	
46	18 November 2023	Annapurna, Sri Lakshmi	Y. Vijaya, Jayalakshmi	
47	25 November 2023	Yamuna, Tarun Tej	Sanjay Bhargav, Naveena	
48	2 December 2023	Sudigali Sudheer, Dollysha	Raviteja Nannimala, Arun Vikkirala	
49	9 December 2023	Nithiin, Brahmaji	Vakkantham Vamsi, Hyper Aadi	
50	16 December 2023	Sri Satya, Hameeda, Sharon Stella	Srikar Krishna, Yadamma Raju, Arjun Kalyan	
51	23 December 2023	Rajeev Kanakala, Ravikanth Perepu, Anannyaa Akulaa	Roshan Kanakala, Maanasa Choudhary, Suresh Ragutu, Kiran Macha	
52	30 December 2023	Nandamuri Kalyan Ram, Samyuktha Menon	Shafi, Srikanth Vissa	

=== 2024 ===
#	Premiere	Team 1	Team 2	Ref
53	6 January 2024	Teja Sajja, Amritha Aiyer	Prasanth Varma, Getup Srinu	
54	13 January 2024	Sivaji, Mouli Tanuj Prasanth, Aditya Hasan	Vasuki Anand, Vasanthika Macha, Rohan Roy	
55	20 January 2024	Prince Cecil, Tejaswi Madivada	Abhinayashree, VJ Sunny	
56	27 January 2024	Indraja, Mukku Avinash	Syed Sohel Ryan, Megha Lekha	
57	3 February 2024	Thagubothu Ramesh, Emmanuel, Varsha	Rohini Noni, Bhaskar, Naresh	
58	10 February 2024	Siddharth Varma, Vishnu Priya	Krishna Chaitanya, Mrudula	
59	17 February 2024	Sundeep Kishan, Varsha Bollamma	Vi Anand, Ram Prasad, Chota K. Prasad	
60	24 February 2024	Harsha Chemudu, Divya Sripada	Vidyullekha Raman, Kalyan Santhosh	
61	2 March 2024	Jackie, Sunny, Riya	Keerthana Podwal, Hemanth	
62	9 March 2024	Gopichand, Priya Bhavani Shankar	Malvika Sharma, K. K. Radhamohan, Rohini Noni	
63	16 March 2024	Mounika Desam, Sriraj Balla, Krishna Reddy	Selva Ra, Harika Sadu, Anusha	
64	23 March 2024	Sree Vishnu, Rahul Ramakrishna	Priyadarshi, Sree Harsha Konuganti	
65	30 March 2024	Preeti Nigam, Mirchi Madhavi, Sruthi Singampalli	Lahari Arundhathi, Anjali, Sireesha	
66	6 April 2024	Mano, Manisha Eerabathini	Raghu Kunche, Kalpana Raghavendar	
67	13 April 2024	Anjali, Kona Venkat	Srinivasa Reddy, Shiva Thurlapati	
68	20 April 2024	Navdeep, Pankhuri Gidwani	Charvi Dutta, Mirchi Kiran	
69	27 April 2024	Suhas, Rashi Singh	Sharanya Pradeep, Bhadram	
70	4 May 2024	Getup Srinu, Ankita Kharat, Sunny	Kevvu Karthik, Sridevi, Praveen	
71	11 May 2024	Vishwak Sen, Krishna Chaitanya	Madhunandan, Pammi Sai	
72	18 May 2024	Kartikeya Gummakonda, Iswarya Menon	Prashanth Reddy	
73	25 May 2024	Gayatri Bhargavi, Shilpa Chakravarthy	Vindhya Vishaka, Geetha Bhagath	
74	1 June 2024	Anand Devarakonda, Nayan Sarika	Emmanuel, Prince Yawar	
75	4 June 2024	Vaishnavi Chaitanya, Ashish Reddy	Ravi Krishna, Simran Choudhary	
76	11 June 2024 (Note: Additionally Chandini Chowdary and Ajay Ghosh have participated in a segment to promote their film Music Shop Murthy.)	Madhuri, Kiran, Nikhitha	Sharmitha Goud, Giri Shankar, Nainisha	
77	18 June 2024	Shiva Parvathi, Sripriya Shreekar	Ragini, Haritha Jackie	
78	25 June 2024	Rajesh, Madhulika, Priyanka	Manjula Paritala, Raj, Maheswari	
79	2 July 2024	Roll Rida, Sri Satya	Mukku Avinash, Ariyana Glory	
80	9 July 2024	Pavan Sidhu, Rupa Lakshmi	Kireeti Damaraju, Sonia Singh, Yadamma Raju	
81	16 July 2024	Siddharth Varma, Shalomi Dsouza	Madhu Babu, Ravi Rathod, Lakshya Shetty	
82	23 July 2024	Ali, Sowmya Rao	Shrihan, Siri Hanumanth	
83	30 July 2024	Varun Sandesh, Kushalini Pulapa, Aparna Devi	Viva Raghav, Nukaraju, Pramodini Pammi	
84	6 August 2024	Niharika Konidela, Anudeep Dev, Yadhu Vamsi	Prasad Behara, Sharanya Suresh	
85	13 August 2024	Shashidhar, Meghana Kushi, Bhargav	Yashmi Gowda, Amar, Madhavi Latha	
86	20 August 2024	Tejas Gowda, Kavya Shree, Samanvitha	Bhavana, Bharath, Veena Ponnappa	
87	27 August 2024	Nivetha Thomas, Vishwadev Rachakonda, Nanda Kishore	Bhaskar, Naresh, Krishna Teja	
88	3 September 2024	Adarsh, Rocky, Sathwik	Varshini, Sri Priya, Swetha Naidu	
89	10 September 2024	Rocket Raghava, Ashok Yedidha, Ishwarya Vullingala	Bojjapalli Venkey, Punch Prasad, Jabardasth Haritha	
90	17 September 2024	Sai Kiran, Vasanthi Krishnan, Raksha Gowda	Prasanthi, Sri Harsha, Nikhil Nair	
91	24 September 2024	Shobha Shetty, Subhashree Rayaguru, Aswini Shree	Tasty Teja, Gautham Krishna, Sandeep Master	
92	1 October 2024	Sree Vishnu, Getup Srinu	Ritu Varma, Daksha Nagarkar	
93	8 October 2024	Sudheer Babu, Shashank	Sayaji Shinde, Mahesh Achanta	
94	15 October 2024	Pallavi Ramisetty, Ravi Kiran, Manasa	Hritesh, Sri Latha, Bhavana Reddy	
95	22 October 2024	Emmanuel, Yadammaraju, Shanthi Swaroop	Varsha, Saddam, Nookaraju	
96	29 October 2024	Sireesha Damera, Pandu, Usha Vaibhavi	Jaswanth Padala, Sunandha, Maheshwari	
97	5 November 2024	Noel Sean, Gully Boy Riyaz	Ananya Nagalla, Yuva Chandraa Krishna	
98	12 November 2024	Pavan Sidhu, Tejaswi Madivada	Amit Tiwari, Ananya Sharma	
99	19 November 2024	Anchor Ravi, Viya, Nitya	Ali Reza, Masuma, Amaira	
100	26 November 2024	Faima Sheikh, Geetu Royal, Keerthi Bhat	Bhole Shavali, Damini Bhatla, Pallavi Prasanth	
101	3 December 2024	Shiva Jyothi, Jordar Sujatha, Lasya Manjunath	Ganguly, Rocking Rakesh, Manjunath	
102	10 December 2024	Shreya Rani, Janu Lyri, Mythili	Anvesh, Ramu Rathod, Prem Ranjith	
103	17 December 2024	Ritu Chowdary, Ashu Reddy, Neha Chowdary	RJ Chaitu, RJ Surya, Anchor Shiva	
104	24 December 2024	Mohana Krishna Indraganti, Roopa Koduvayur, Harshini	Priyadarshi Pulikonda, Srinivas Avasarala	

=== 2025 ===
#	Premiere	Team 1	Team 2	Ref
105	7 January 2025	Jackie Thota, Haritha Thota	Indraaniel, Meghana	
106	14 January 2025	Anil Ravipudi, Meenakshi Chaudhary	Aishwarya Rajesh, Bheems Ceciroleo	
107	21 January 2025	Dhanunjay Seepana, Sahithi Chaganti	Deepu, Harika Narayan	
108	28 January 2025	Selvaraj, Sheela Singh, Lahari Arundhati Vishnuvazhala	Nagesh, Usha Rani, Ushasri	
109	4 February 2025	Punch Prasad, Gaddam Naveen, Bojjapalli Venkey	Sunitha, Bhabitha, Vaishnavi	
110	11 February 2025	Vishwak Sen, Akanksha Sharma	Praneeth Reddy Kallem,	
111	18 February 2025	Bellamkonda Sreenivas, Sandeep Raj, Aditi Shankar	Raja Ravindra, Vijay Kanakamedala	
112	25 February 2025	Swetha Varma, Mahesh Vitta	Natraj Master, RJ Kajal	
113	4 March 2025	Yashwanth Master, Bhushan Master	Bhanu, Vijay Polaki	
114	16 March 2025	Nithin, Sangeeth Sobhan, Ram Nithin	Vishnu Oi, Kalyan Shankar, K. V. Anudeep	
115	23 March 2025	Maanas Nagulapalli, Rupa, Srikar Krishna	Kavya Shree, Viren Srinivas	
116	30 March 2025	VJ Sunny, Priyanka Singh	Siri Hanumanth, Hamida Khatoon	
117	6 April 2025	Pradeep Machiraju, Getup Srinu	Ramprasad, Raghu Master	
118	13 April 2025	Sampath Nandi, Hebah Patel, Srikanth Iyengar	Vasishta N. Simha, Sudharshan, Mahesh Achanta	
119	20 April 2025	Anudeep Dev, Sameera Bharadwaj	R. P. Patnaik, Raghu Kunche	
120	27 April 2025	Priyanka Jain, Shoba Shetty	Arjun Ambati, Suhasini	
121	4 May 2025	Sushma, Vishnupriya, Maheshwari	Siddharth, Ravi Kiran, Shivanag	
122	11 May 2025	Sree Vishnu, Caarthick Raju	Vennela Kishore, Ketika Sharma, Ivana	
123	18 May 2025	Suhas, Ram Godhala, Sathvik Anand Bandela	Ali, Sowmya Rao	
124	25 May 2025	Princy B. Krishnan, Tejaswini Gowda	Aishwarya Pisse, Sindhura DK	
125	1 June 2025	Harsh Roshan, Nihal Kodhaty, Rithu Chowdary	Karthikeya Dev, Madhu Sudhan Rapeti, Sri Satya	
126	8 June 2025	Sumanth, Kajal Choudhary, and Viharsh	Rakesh Rachakonda, Kaumudi Nemani	
127	15 June 2025	Eknath Paruchuri, Jaya Harika	Kaushal Manda, Neelima	
128	22 June 2025	Shiva Jyothi, Keerthi, Vandana	Ganguly Manthri, Jai Dhanush, Chandrasekhar	
129	29 June 2025	Sandeep Raj, Chandini Rao, Jayateertha Molugu	Harsh Roshan, Joseph Clinton, Ariyana Glory	
130	6 July 2025	Naveen Chandra, Kamakshi Bhaskarla	Raja Ravindra, Gemini Suresh	
131	13 July 2025	Gautham Krishna, Shwetha Avasthi, Arun Kumar	Purna Chari, Sandeep, Jyoti Raj	
132	20 July 2025	Priyadarshi Pulikonda, Niharika Nm, Vijayender S	Vishnu Oi, Prasad Behara, RR Dhruvan	
133	27 July 2025	Rakesh, Shekar, Vijay	Sujatha, Neelima, Keerthi	
134	3 August 2025	Nara Rohith, Sridevi Vijaykumar, Vasuki Anand	Virti Vaghani, Sunaina Badam, Venkatesh Nimmalapudi	
135	17 August 2025	Varsha Bollamma, Rajeev Kanakala, Prasanth Kumar Dimmala	Megha Lekha, Ramana Bhargava, Prem Sagar Rajulapati	
136	24 August 2025	Vindhya Vishaka, RJ Chaitu, Geetha Bhagat	Shiva, Prashanthi, Varanasi Soumya	
137	31 August 2025	Krishna Chaitanya, Mrudhula	Sameera Bharadwaj, Adithya	
138	7 September 2025	Yodha Kandrathi, Deevena, Chaitra Lakshmi	Jabardasth Naresh, Murari, Nihanth	
139	14 September 2025	Pallavi Ramisetty, Varun, Abhishek Yannam, Varun Raj	Hemashree, Krishna, Darshini Delta	
140	21 September 2025	Naga Manikanta, Prerana Kambam	Nikhil Maliyakkal, Nainika Anasuru	
141	5 October 2025	Siddhu Jonnalagadda, Raashii Khanna	Harsha Chemudu, Neeraja Kona, Adviteeya Vojjala	
142	26 October 2025	Vishnu Priya, Prithviraj Shetty	Kirrak Seetha, Nabeel Afridi	
143	2 November 2025	Mahesh Babu Kalidasu, Pawan Kalyan, Yashpal Veeragoni	Sandra Jaichandran, Vasanthi Krishnan, Soniya Akula	
144	9 November 2025	Shivani Nagaram, Jai Krishna, Padmini Settam	Mouli Tanuj Prasanth, Sai Marthand, Nikhil Abburi	
145	16 November 2025	Allari Naresh, Kamakshi Bhaskarla	Jeevan Kumar Naidu, Nani Kasaragadda, Anil Viswanath	
