= Arundhati (2009 film) =

2009 Indian film directed by Kodi Ramakrishna

- Theatrical release poster
- Directed by: Kodi Ramakrishna
- Written by: Manav Mahapatra; Shyam Prasad Reddy; Chintapalli Ramana (Dialogues)
- Produced by: Shyam Prasad Reddy
- Starring: Anushka Shetty; Sonu Sood
- Cinematography: K. K. Senthil Kumar
- Visual effects by: P. C. Sanath
- Edited by: Marthand K. Venkatesh
- Music by: Koti
- Production company: Mallemala Entertainments
- Release date: 16 January 2009 (India)
- Running time: 131 minutes
- Country: India
- Language: Telugu
- Budget: ₹13.5 crore
- Box office: est. ₹70 crore

Arundhati is a 2009 Indian Telugu-language dark horror fantasy action film directed by Kodi Ramakrishna, and produced by Shyam Prasad Reddy, under his banner, Mallemala Entertainments. The film stars Anushka Shetty in the titular role, alongside Sonu Sood, Arjan Bajwa, Sayaji Shinde, Manorama, and Kaikala Satyanarayana. The music is composed by Koti with cinematography by K. K. Senthil Kumar and editing by Marthand K. Venkatesh.

Released on 16 January 2009, the film was a major commercial success, grossing over ₹70 crore with a distributor's share of ₹36 crore in its Telugu version becoming the second highest-grossing Telugu film of its time to be released in Telugu. Including its dubbed versions which brought its distributor's share to over ₹43 crore, Arundhati was the highest grossing Telugu film until it was surpassed by Magadheera later that year. It was also the highest-grossing female led film in South India until 2015, when it was surpassed by the Telugu biographical film, Rudhramadevi, which again starred Anushka in the lead role which was surpassed in 2018 by Keerthy Suresh's Mahanati. It was surpassed by Samantha Ruth Prabhu's Maa Inti Bangaaram in 2026. The film was also the only South Indian female led film to have over 1.8 crore footfalls. The success of the film turned Anushka into a major movie star overnight in Telugu cinema. The film received several accolades, including ten Nandi Awards, and two Filmfare Awards South.

The film was remade in Bengali with the same name in 2014.

== Plot ==
Arundhati, a young woman, is engaged to Rahul in Hyderabad. En route to Arundhati's ancestral estate in Gadwal, her relatives Ramana and Susheela are lured into an abandoned mansion by a mysterious woman. In contrast, a mysterious watchman orders the couple to flee. Revealing herself to be an evil spirit, the woman orders Ramana to free her son from his sealed tomb. While Ramana flees, Susheela vanishes.

After Arundhati's grandfather, Bhupathi Raja, is injured by the mysterious entity, Arundhati and the rest of the family arrive in Gadwal. Anwar, a local Fakir, cautions Arundhati of impending danger, but she ignores him. That night, Arundhati is drawn to the abandoned mansion, where she finds the tomb. Anwar rescues a briefly possessed Arundhati and exposes the evil presence inside the mansion, urging her to leave Gadwal. Terrified and curious, Arundhati questions her family's aged caretaker, Chandramma, who recounts the history of the mansion and Arundhati's legendary great-grandmother, Arundhati "Jejamma" Sr.

Decades earlier, Gadwal is ruled by Raja Chinna Venkata Ranga Rayudu and his daughters, Bhargavi and Jejamma. Bhargavi's husband, Pasupathi, is a licentious man who abuses his position alongside his mother, Jalajamma. When Pasupathi molests and murders Jejamma's dance instructor, Jejamma demands punishment. Realising that her marriage hinders retribution against Pasupathi, Bhargavi commits suicide. Outraged by the events, Jejamma orders the public to violently banish Pasupathi from Gadwal, tying him to his horse. Rescued by a group of Aghoras, Pasupathi seeks revenge for his humiliation and masters black magic. He returns seven years later on Jejamma's wedding day. Lusting for her, Pasupathi demands that she surrender to him and critically wounds the guests and Rayudu. However, Jejamma subdues him using a tricky dance form and entombs him alive inside the mansion, which was subsequently abandoned. In the present, Pasupathi manipulates Ramana into releasing his spirit. He possesses the servants inside the estate and creates a living hell for Arundhati, who sends the rest of her family members out at Pasupathi's behest. Anwar and Chandramma intervene and explain to Arundhati that she is Jejamma's direct reincarnation.

In the past, forty-eight days after Pasupathi was entombed alive and a few days after his death, his Pretatma warned Jejamma about her estate's impending destruction. Learning that Pasupathi's spirit could only be destroyed by a weapon forged from her mortal remains and that he would be killed by her reincarnation, Jejamma willingly sacrificed her life to the Aghoras after requesting her family to name her next female descendant after her. The Aghoras cremated her body and forged a sacred bone weapon to destroy Pasupathi's spirit. Pasupathi, upon learning this, predicts that she will come to satisfy his sexual revenge at midnight sharp, 12 a.m.

Currently, Arundhati and Anwar attempt to retrieve the weapon. However, on their way to meet the Aghoras, Pasupathi causes their car to crash, apparently killing Anwar. He further lures Rahul to Gadwal and kills Chandramma, who tried to help him. A dejected Arundhati arrives at the dilapidated mansion to protect her family members as predicted by Pasupathi. Meanwhile, Anwar survives and retrieves the weapon from the Aghoras. He arrives at the mansion with the weapon, but Pasupathi slays him before he can explain its use to Arundhati. Refusing to succumb to Pasupathi, a devastated Arundhati stabs herself, causing her spilt blood to activate the weapon. Channelling Jejamma's power, Arundhati eradicates Pasupathi, causing the mansion to collapse.

Arundhati's family members, who came searching for her, escape the collapsing mansion unscathed, while Rahul arrives there as the mansion collapses to the ground. They grieve her presumed loss until Arundhati's young niece spots her emerging from the rubble and identifies her as Jejamma, making the family happy.

== Cast ==
- Anushka Shetty in a dual role as
  - Sr. Arundhati/Jejamma, the Queen of Gadwal (dubbed by Shilpa)
    - Divya Nagesh as young Jejamma
  - Jr. Arundhati, Jejamma's great-granddaughter and reincarnation of Jejamma (dubbed by Sowmya Sharma)
- Sonu Sood as Pasupathi, Jejamma's Brother-in-Law and Bhargavi's husband (dubbed by P. Ravi Shankar)
- Sayaji Shinde as Anwar, the local fakir who helps Jr. Arundhati
- Manorama as Chandramma, Jejamma's family maid and helper
- Kaikala Satyanarayana as Bhupathi Raja, Jr. Arundhati's grandfather and Jejamma's younger son
- Arjan Bajwa as Rahul, Jr. Arundhati's fiance
- Subhashini as Jalajamma, Pasupathi's mother and Jejamma's aunt
- Ahuti Prasad as Jr. Arundhati's father
- Chalapathi Rao as Jr. Arundhati's uncle
- Bhel Prasad Rao as Nilendra Varma, Bhupathi Raja's late elder brother
- Leena Sidhu as Kanchana
- Meena Vasu as Bhargavi, Jejamma's elder sister
- Prudhvi Raj as Jr. Arundhati's uncle
- Annapoorna as Bhupati Raja's wife, Jr. Arundhati's grandmother
- Shiva Parvathi as Mahalakshmi, Jr. Arundhati's mother
- Jaya Lakshmi as Jr. Arundhati's aunt
- Jayalalita as Manga
- Praveena as Susheela

== Production ==
=== Development ===
Shyam Prasad Reddy revealed that he got the idea of Arundhati while receiving National Awards for the film Anji (2004). Being inspired from films like Chandramukhi and The Exorcist, he made it a female-oriented story "for a bigger appeal so that the entire family could watch it. I added classical dance to it. I wanted to mount the film on a grandeur scale.[sic] I wanted to play the film on 'fear of the evil spirit'. Arundhati is about good fighting evil. Hence I had to make sure that both the characters of Arundhati and Pasupati equally powerful [sic]".

=== Casting ===
Shyam Prasad Reddy wanted somebody with a 5'10" (5 feet 10 inches) height and "should look royal because she is the queen, and she rides on horses and elephants". Gemini Kiran suggested Shyam Prasad Reddy to choose Anushka for the role. After conducting her photoshoot, Shyam Prasad Reddy explained the story and Arundhati's characterisation. Reddy wanted Tamil actor Pasupathy to enact the role of an antagonist of the same name but since the character has "a royal side to the character where he has to look princely", he had chosen Sonu Sood for the role after seeing his performance in Ashok (2006).

For the characterisation of Fakir who helps Anushka's character in the present era, Shyam Prasad Reddy drew inspiration from the priest character in the 1976 American horror film The Omen. He considered Naseeruddin Shah, Nana Patekar and Atul Kulkarni for the role; however, none of their dates were available. Sayaji Shinde was finally chosen for the character.

=== Filming ===
==== Principal photography ====
Filming took around 250 days, in Hyderabad and other places. The interior of the place is shot at the Annapurna Studios, while the exterior was at Banganapalle fort at Kurnool. Filming also took place at Ramanaidu Studios. The drum dance involving Anushka choreographed by Sivashankar who "had to coordinate with the graphics team to get the exact precision" and was shot for 45 days at a set erected at Annapoorna Studios. The costumes for Anushka was designed by Deepa Joshi. According to the film's cinematographer Senthilkumar, they used Motion control camera for the first time in Telugu cinema that "could shoot glittering fort and dilapidated fort with the same motion control."

==== Post production ====
===== Dubbing =====
Sowmya Sharma had dubbed for the character of modern-day Arundhati and Shilpa for Jejjama. Dubbing voice for Sonu Sood was provided by P. Ravishankar. Ravishankar completed the dubbing within 14 days and found it to be "most challenging work" and his voice "has gone sore for 5 times during this process".

===== Visual effects =====
Rahul Nambiar was appointed as Creative Director and Visual Effects Supervisor by Shyam Prasad Reddy for this feature film. Nambiar felt that showcasing a ghost as the main villain, throughout the film was challenging. With help of some dedicated scenes written, visualization, and visual effects, Nambiar and his team could achieve and what they had planned with Reddy.

Nambiar also stated "We created all the action in computer dolls, animated all of them and added all the film cameras and made it like a film. We saw it as a rough edit and then we shot it. There was a lot of meticulous work. The pre-production itself took about seven months".

== Music ==
The music and background music of this film was composed by Koti. The soundtrack was critically acclaimed. Especially the tracks "Jejamma", "Chandamama" and "Bhu Bhu" and in Tamil "Bhoomi Kodhikum", "Gummiruttil Kudamkizhithu kundril ezhum", "Enna Viratham Ettrai Neeyamma" were huge hits. The album featured eminent singers like K. S. Chithra, Kailash Kher, Kalpana Raghavendar and N. C. Karunya. Koti, while speaking said that this film helped him to prove himself and in his career of 30 years this was his personal best. The track "Jejamma" required a majestic and ambient grandeur, so Koti selected Kailash Kher. The track "Bhu Bhu" took many days for Koti to compose and he felt it should be sung by an amazing singer who could aptly give the ferocious feel and hence went with Chithra. Lyrics were written by Veturi for "Bhu Bhu Bhujangam", Anant Sriram for "Chandamama", and C. Narayana Reddy for "Jejamma". This album features four songs and three instrumentals.

Telugu track listing
No.	Title	Singer(s)	Length
1.	"Chandamama Nuvve Nuvve"	Sandeep, Sai Krishna, Murali, Naga Sahiti, Renukha & Chorus	5:35
2.	"Bhu Bhu Bhujangam"	K. S. Chithra	5:25
3.	"Kammu Konna Cheekatlona"	Kailash Kher	7:48
4.	"Harivillulona Prananiposi"	N. C. Karunya	5:15
5.	"Soul Of Arundathi" (Arundathi's Music)	Instrumental	2:19
6.	"Agony Of Evil" (Pasupathi's Music)	Instrumental	2:35
7.	"The Believer" (Pakheer's's Music)	Instrumental	1:19

Tamil track listing
No.	Title	Singer(s)	Length
1.	"Kannipenmai Poove Poove"	Tippu, Saindhavi	4:29
2.	"Bhoomi Kodhikum"	Kalpana Raghavendar	5:25
3.	"Gummiruttil Kudamkizhithu kundril ezhum"	Kailash Kher	1:59
4.	"Enna Viratham Ettrai Neeyamma"	Kailash Kher	4:52
5.	"Thikku ettum"	Kailash Kher	0:50

== Release ==
The Tamil dubbed version of the film, which was distributed by Sri Thenandal Films, was released on 20 March 2009. The film received an "A" certificate from the Central Board of Film Certification for excessive violence and gore.

== Reception ==
=== Critical reception ===
Rediff gave it three stars out of five and said, "The main plus points of the film are screenplay (creative director Rahul Nambiar and the Mallemalla Unit), art direction (Ashok), cinematography (Senthil Kumar), editing (Marthand K. Venkatesh), special effects and the performances of Anushka [Images], Sonu Sood and Sayaji Shinde. On the whole, Arundhati is a watchable film provided you don't have a weak heart and don't get into discussing logic, science, and rationality. Just watch what unfolds on the screen – for that's visual grandeur". Sify gave its verdict as "Worth a watch" with four stars noted, "The film has come across with some really mind-blowing graphics and presentation, even the performances were top-notch that helped. While the drums scene is a take from the Chinese movie 'House of Flying Daggers' it was well taken and presented. The shock points are high and one can say that the film is definitely not for the weak-hearted. There are enough chilling moments to shake the audience off their chair. The film is one of the best made ever in the history of Telugu cinema in terms of technical values so it deserves to be a good hit". Telugu Cinema wrote "Arundhati provides new visual experience for Telugu audiences. A good watch for the viewers! It is racy and entertaining. Screenplay and visual graphics are superb. The best part is that it is focused on its story and doesn’t deviate from the main theme. It is really graphical extravaganza. Despite many logic-less scenes, it gives unique experience for viewers. Go for it".

Behindwoods reviewing the Tamil dubbed version, gave 3 out of 5 stars and stated "Old school horror, new age film making".

=== Box office ===
The film grossed ₹70 crore at the box office with ₹3 crore from overseas markets. The satellite rights of the film were sold to Gemini TV for ₹ 7 crore.

== Accolades ==
Nandi Awards 2008

Though the film was released in 2009, it was registered for 2008 films for Nandi Awards. The film received a total of 10 Nandi awards.

- Best Villain – Sonu Sood
- Best Child Actress – Divya Nagesh
- Best Editor – Marthand K Venkatesh
- Best Art Director – Ashok
- Best Audiographer – Radhakrishna & Madhusudhan Reddy
- Best Costume Designer – Deepa Chandar
- Best Makeup Artist – Ramesh Mahanti
- Best Male Dubbing Artist – P. Ravi Shankar
- Best Special Effects – Rahul Nambiar
- Special Jury Award – Anushka Shetty

Filmfare Awards South – 2009

- Best Actress – Telugu – Anushka Shetty
- Best Supporting Actor – Telugu – Sonu Sood

Santosham Film Awards

- Best Director – Kodi Ramakrishna
- Best Producer – Shyam Prasad Reddy
- Best Actress – Anushka Shetty
- Best Villain – Sonu Sood
- Best Dubbing Artist Male – P. Ravi Shankar
- Best Cameraman – K. K. Senthil Kumar

== Legacy ==
Arundhati's success turned Anushka into one of the most sought-after actresses in Telugu and catapulted her into the foray of leading Telugu actresses. Sonu Sood attained stardom with this film and went on to work in several South Indian films as an antagonist. After the release of Arundhati, people began recognising him as Pasupathi. P. Ravishankar who dubbed for him also became popular and was referred to as 'Bommali or Bommali Ravi Shankar' by the media thereafter.

According to writer Gopimohan, Arundhati made audience to "welcome creative content" and Magadheera started a trend of experimentation with period, socio-fantasy and spiritual themes that was continued in films like Panchakshari (2010), Nagavalli (2010), Anaganaga O Dheerudu (2011), Mangala (2011), Sri Rama Rajyam (2011) and Uu Kodathara? Ulikki Padathara? (2012). Tammareddy Bharadwaja said "Ever since Arundhati and Magadheera did well at the box office, the rest of the industry started following their footsteps. Also, since there is an irrational craze to make high budget films right now, producers are turning towards mythological films. It is the only genre where you can boast of spending crores for creating the sets and the look of the film. But what they don't realize is that if these films flop, the blow to the producer will be severe." Films like Anaganaga O Dheerudu (2011) and Sakthi (2011) were commercial failures and Badrinath (2012) was an average grosser; all being fantasy films in which the protagonist is a warrior.

== See also ==
- Arundhati
