= Anji (film) =

2004 film by Kodi Ramakrishna

- Poster
- Directed by: Kodi Ramakrishna
- Written by: Story & Screenplay: M. S. Art Movies Unit; Dialogues: Satyanand
- Produced by: Shyam Prasad Reddy
- Starring: Chiranjeevi; Namrata Shirodkar; Tinnu Anand; Nagendra Babu
- Cinematography: Chota K. Naidu
- Edited by: K. V. Krishna Reddy
- Music by: Mani Sharma
- Production company: M. S. Art Movies
- Release date: 15 January 2004
- Running time: 148 minutes
- Country: India
- Language: Telugu
- Budget: ₹25–35 crore

Anji is a 2004 Indian Telugu-language fantasy action-adventure film directed by Kodi Ramakrishna and produced by Shyam Prasad Reddy. The film stars Chiranjeevi in the titular role, alongside Namrata Shirodkar, Tinnu Anand and Nagendra Babu. The film has music composed by Mani Sharma with cinematography by Chota K. Naidu. It was produced on an estimated budget of ₹25–35 crore, making it the most expensive Telugu film at the time of its release. The story follows Anji's quest to protect the mystical Aatmalingam, which grants immortality every 72 years, from the clutches of the ruthless billionaire Veerendra Bhatia.

The film was in production for over six years, facing multiple delays before its release on 15 January 2004, during the Sankranthi festival. Anji received praise for its visual effects and Chiranjeevi's performance, but struggled to achieve commercial success due to its high budget. The film won two Nandi Awards and the National Film Award for Best Special Effects, marking the first time a Telugu film won a National Award in that category. Additionally, Anji was featured in the Limca Book of Records as the first Indian film to use 3D digital graphics. The film was later dubbed into Hindi as Diler - Daring, Tamil as Kollimalai Singam, and Malayalam as Chekavan.

== Plot ==
The Atmalingam, a symbol of Lord Shiva, possesses enormous divine powers. Once every 72 years, the Akasha Ganga (Heavenly dimension of the Ganga river from the universe) flows onto the Atmalingam. Those who drink Akasha Ganga's holy water become immortal and gain supernatural powers.

In 1932, during the colonial rule in India, a greedy youngster named Veerendra Bhatia with two greedy tantriks are in search of the Atmalingam from a cave which is guarded by a divine trident and a gigantic cobra. They try to bring it but fail, resulting in the deaths of the two tantriks and Bhatia losing his right hand. The sacred Atmalingam gets swept away in the river and becomes invisible. Time progresses and Bhatia, now 99 years old, searches for the Atmalingam's traces, but in vain. Akasha Ganga is slated to flow to the earth for the Atmalingam in 2004. Finally, he learns about a professor who researched the Atmalingam and the Akasha Ganga and possesses vital information in a red diary.

Fearing for his life and this information, the professor sends the diary to his student Swapna, who is in the US, so that Bhatia will not be able to become immortal. After receiving the journal, Swapna, sensing danger to her professor, comes back to India in search of him, only to find him killed. While escaping from Bhatia, she runs into Anji, a good samaritan in the Uravakonda forest area, who serves the most revered Sivanna, an ayurvedic specialist, while also raising four orphans.

One day, Anji stumbles on the Atmalingam and takes its possession. After learning about it, Bhatia and his men go after Anji and Swapna. As the D-Day of Akasha Ganga is fast approaching, Sivanna tells Anji that the Atmalingam should be sent back to where it belongs. So, Anji and Swapna go to the Himalayas to reinstall the Atmalingam in a temple that was built using shaligram stones by the legendary king Bhagiratha. The temple becomes visible only after 72 years. Using help from the diary, Anji enters the temple and faces many traps in the temple and survives to reinstall the Atmalingam in the sanctum of the temple. But the evil Bhatia drinks the water before Anji can drink it. One of the orphans gets shot. Anji and Bhatia get into a fight, and at last, Lord Shiva himself appears and kills Bhatia using his third eye. Anji manages to run from the temple, and a drop of the holy water revives the orphan who had been shot by Bhatia. Anji, Swapna, and the four orphans return to their home in a helicopter, and the Atmalingam and the temple vanish, never to be seen again.

== Cast ==
- Chiranjeevi as Anji
- Namrata Shirodkar as Swapna
- Tinnu Anand as Veerendra Bhatia
  - Bhupinder Singh as young Bhatia
- Nagendra Babu as Sivanna
- M. S. Narayana
- Akshay Reddy as Master Akshay
- Bharat as Master Bharat
- Vamsi as Master Vamsi
- Meghana Gummi as Baby Meghana
- Keerthana as Baby Keerthana
- Nitya Shetty as Baby Nithya
- Saraswatamma
- Rami Reddy as the local hunter
- Madhusudhan Rao as Bhatia's henchman (uncredited)
- Ramya Krishna has a special appearance in the song "Chikbuk Pori"
- Alphonsa also has a special appearance in the song "Chikbuk Pori"
- Reema Sen has a special appearance in the song "Mirapakaya Bajji"
- Rajlaxmi Roy has a special appearance in the song "Manava Manava"

== Production ==
=== Development ===
In May 1997, Zamin Ryot reported that Kodi Ramakrishna would direct Chiranjeevi in a big-budget film produced by Shyam Prasad Reddy. By 24 October 1997, the same newspaper reported that the film would commence on 1 November 1997. A subsequent report in Zamin Ryot a week later revealed that Shyam Prasad Reddy had already traveled to the United States four times to finalize the graphics work for the project but named D. Sabapathy as the director instead.

=== Casting ===
In December 1998, India Today revealed that Tinu Anand would portray a centenarian searching for a magic potion that promises eternal youth. By August 2000, Bhupinder Singh was confirmed as part of the cast, and in March 2001, it was reported that Singh would play the main villain, with Tinu Anand portraying the older version of the character. Additionally, one of the tantriks in the film's opening scene was portrayed by a beggar who frequented the L. V. Prasad Eye Institute.

=== Filming ===
In June 2000, Idlebrain.com mentioned a tentative release date of 1 October 2000 for the film. By 11 September 2000, producer Shyam Prasad Reddy announced that shooting would be completed by 15 October 2000, with the film set for a 22 December 2000 release. However, Chiranjeevi later revealed in a 16 September 2000 interview with Rediff that the film was yet to be titled, with options including Anji or Akasaganga. He attributed the production delays to the extensive graphics work, which involved 20–24 minutes of 3-D animation, a first in Indian cinema. The graphics were managed by Chris, also known as UK-2, at London's Digitalia Studio.

By November 2001, filming was almost complete except for the songs, which were planned for December 2001 and January 2002, aiming for a February 2002 release. When questioned about the lengthy production process, director Kodi Ramakrishna noted that the extensive graphics work justified the four-year timeline. He praised Shyam Prasad Reddy for his dedication to making an extraordinary film, rather than opting for a quick profit with a mass-market production.

In January 2002, Telugucinema.com reported the film's release date as 9 April 2002. By March, it was reported that two songs had been completed, one featuring Chiranjeevi with Reema Sen and another with Rajlaxmi, who had recently appeared in a special song in the Hindi film Asoka (2001). A special number with a Bollywood actress was planned for April 2002, to be filmed on a market-themed set. The report also noted that the film was shot entirely in a forest and revolves around a search for Akasa Ganga, a mystical site containing a powerful Siva Lingam.

In May 2002, producer Shyam Prasad Reddy anticipated completing the graphics work for Anji by 30 July, aiming for a release shortly after 15 August. However, by August, the graphics work was still in progress at Digitalia in the UK, prompting a shift in potential release dates to the Dasara festival in 2002 or Sankranthi in 2003.

By September 2002, Idlebrain.com reported that the graphic work for Anji was still underway under the supervision of Chris at Digitalia. Producer Shyam Prasad Reddy announced plans to release the film on 9 January 2003 but acknowledged potential delays if the visual effects required additional time. The report also stated that the film's budget was ₹35 crore, including extended production expenses and interest, and that Anji needed to surpass the success of Indra (2002) to recover its costs.

In December 2003, Shyam Prasad Reddy confirmed that the film would have a theatrical release with five songs, with the "Gumma Gulabi Komma" song to be filmed and added during the fourth week of its run.

A decade after the film's release, Kodi Ramakrishna revealed that Chiranjeevi wore the same shirt for two years without washing it to maintain continuity. He also mentioned that some scenes required 100 to 120 shots.

=== Visual effects and design ===
Anji featured digitally enhanced animated characters. Noted director and illustrator Bapu created sketches of Lord Siva, Siva Lingam, and an old temple, which served as the basis for models and sets. Firefly Creative Studio handled the visual effects for the closing battle, the Lord Siva temple, one of the romantic songs, and the Maha Sivaratri festival scene. The graphics work also involved studios from the United States, Singapore, and Malaysia.

== Music ==
Mani Sharma composed the songs and background score for the film. The song "Chik Buk Pori" was composed by Sri, but Mani Sharma did the rerecording of the song.

Track list
No.	Title	Lyrics	Singer(s)	Length
1.	"Chik Buk Pori"	Seetharama Sastry	Kalpana, Shankar Mahadevan	5:09
2.	"Gumma Gulabi Komma"	Seetharama Sastry	Karthik, Mahalakshmi Iyer	5:48
3.	"Abbo Nee Amma"	Bhuvana Chandra	S. P. Balasubrahmanyam, Kalpana	5:45
4.	"Om Shanthi"	Chandrabose	Ganga, Shankar Mahadevan	5:49
5.	"Manava Manava"	Seetharama Sastry	Sunitha, Tippu	5:37
6.	"Mirapakaya Bajji"	Bhuvana Chandra	Radhika, S. P. Balasubrahmanyam	5:57
Total length:				34:08

== Release ==
On 5 January 2004, producer Shyam Prasad Reddy announced that Anji would be censored on 7 January, with a planned release on 9 January. However, on 7 January, MS Arts confirmed that the release had been postponed to 14 January due to delays in finalizing the graphics.

On 8 January, conflicting release dates were reported in different newspapers, with Vaartha listing 14 January and Andhra Jyothi listing 15 January. The confusion arose because the decision to postpone the release was made late on the night of 7 January, and by the time the news was communicated to the media, Vaartha had already printed its editions. The official release date was eventually confirmed as 15 January.

To ensure timely delivery of the film prints, Mohini Films, the distributors for the Vizag region, booked a private air cargo to transport the prints from Hyderabad to Vizag—an unprecedented move in Telugu cinema. Despite the logistical challenges, Anji successfully released on 15 January 2004 during the Sankranthi festival. However, due to delays in printing the necessary number of film prints, the release was pushed to 16 January in some regions.

== Reception ==
Jeevi of Idlebrain.com rated the film 3 out of 5, commending the visual effects and Chiranjeevi's performance while criticising the screenplay and direction. A critic from Sify rated the film 3/5 and wrote, "Despite all those special effects the film is unimpressive as the subject and style is outdated." A critic from Deccan Herald noted, "Anji teaches us how to make a movie out of a logic-defying story". Telugu Cinema wrote "Telugu Cinema audience generally come to a movie to watch the (their) hero play the "hero" in the movie. mRgaraaju was a disaster because of the same reason - the audience expected Chiranjeevi to kill the lion in the second reel, but the movie was dragged for 14 reels! Even in anji, the special effets overshadowed the hero, and this might be a negative point for the movie in the long run. The movie is definitely worth a watch, or good even for a repeated audience, though, if one does not expect Chiranjeevi (in the movie) to be omnipresent and omnipotent".

== Awards ==
National Film Awards

- Best Special Effects – Sanath

Nandi Awards

- Best Cinematographer – Chota K. Naidu
- Best Makeup Artist – Chandra Rao
