= Aagraham (1991 film) =

- Directed by: K. S. Ravi
- Written by: Paruchuri Brothers
- Produced by: Shyam Prasad Reddy
- Starring: Rajasekhar; Amala Akkineni
- Cinematography: Vijay C. Kumar
- Edited by: K. V. Krishna Reddy
- Music by: Raj–Koti
- Production company: M. S. Arts
- Distributed by: Mayuri Film Distributors
- Release date: 1991
- Running time: 136 minutes
- Country: India
- Language: Telugu

Aagraham is a 1991 Indian Telugu-language action drama film directed by K. S. Ravi, starring Rajasekhar and Amala Akkineni. It was produced by Shyam Prasad Reddy on M. S. Arts banner. Prabhu Deva and Raju Sundaram were the choreographers.

== Cast ==
- Rajasekhar
- Amala Akkineni
- Padhire Krishna Reddy
- Ram Gopal
- Ramesh
- Babu Mohan
- Veera Swamy
- Gadiraaju Subbarao
- Sundara Rama Krishna
- Sridhar Reddy
- Rajasekhar Reddy

== Awards ==
- Nandi Award for Best National Integration Film - Shyam Prasad Reddy
