= Kodi Ramakrishna =

Indian film director and screenwriter (1949–2019)

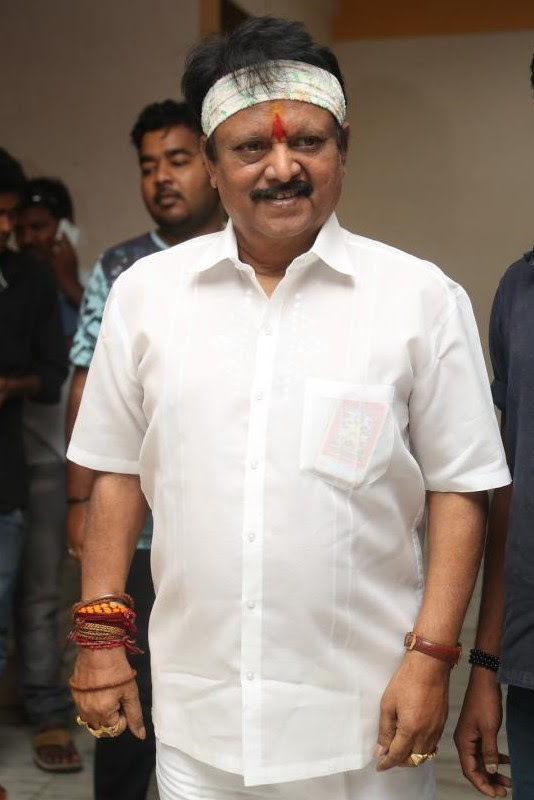
- Ramakrishna in 2019
- Born: 23 July 1949; Palakollu, West Godavari (in present-day Andhra Pradesh, India)
- Died: 22 February 2019 (aged 69); Hyderabad, Telangana, India
- Occupations: Film director; Screenwriter; Actor
- Years active: 1979–2019
- Website: kodiramakrishna.in

Kodi Ramakrishna (23 July 1949 – 22 February 2019) was an Indian film director, screenwriter, and actor, known for his work in Telugu cinema. Over a career spanning more than three decades, he directed over 100 films, a feat that established him as one of the most prolific and versatile filmmakers in the history of the industry. His body of work ranged from hard hitting social dramas and family entertainers to high-budget supernatural thrillers. He pioneered the use of advanced visual effects and CGI in South Indian cinema.

Ramakrishna's directorial debut, Intlo Ramayya Veedilo Krishnayya (1982), was a massive commercial success and marked the beginning of his dominance in the 1980s and 90s with hits like Mangammagari Manavadu (1984), Ankusham (1989), and Shatruvu (1991). His "supernatural fantasy" phase, which included groundbreaking films such as Ammoru (1995), Devi (1999), and the blockbuster Arundhati (2009), set new standards for technical excellence and redefined the commercial potential of the genre. In recognition of his immense impact on the medium, he was honoured with the Raghupathi Venkaiah Award in 2012 for his lifetime contribution to Telugu cinema. He was also a recipient of ten Nandi Awards and two Filmfare Awards .

== Early life and family ==
Kodi Ramakrishna was born on 23 July 1949 in a Telugu family, in Palakollu, West Godavari district of Andhra Pradesh. His career in the Indian cinema industry spanned more than 30 years. His elder daughter Kodi Divya Deepti entered into film production with Nenu Meeku Baaga Kavalsinavaadini (2022).

== Career ==
Kodi Ramakrishna began his career as an associate to Dasari Narayana Rao in Korikale Gurralaite (1979). His debuted as a director with the film Intlo Ramayya Veedhilo Krishnayya (1982). His filmography includes drama films like Mangamma Gari Manavadu (1984), Maa Pallelo Gopaludu (1985), Srinivasa Kalyanam (1987), Aahuthi (1987), Muddula Mavayya (1989), Pelli (1997), Dongaata (1997), and social problem films such as Ankusam (1989), Bharat Bandh (1991), and Sathruvu (1991). He also directed spy films like Gudachari No.1 (1983), and Gudachari 117 (1989), and supernatural fantasy films like Ammoru (1995), Devi (1999), Devullu (2000), Anji (2004), and Arundhati (2009). Arundhati won ten state Nandi Awards and became one of the highest grossing Telugu films ever at the time.

In 2016, he started working Baba Sathya Sai a biopic about Sathya Sai Baba (with Sreejith Vijay in the role).

== Awards ==
In 2012, he received the state Raghupathi Venkaiah Award for his contribution to Telugu cinema. He was also a recipient of ten Nandi Awards and two Filmfare Awards .

== Death ==
Kodi Ramakrishna died on 22 February 2019 in Hyderabad. He was under treatment at AIG Hospitals, Gachibowli for acute breathing problem.

== Filmography ==
=== Director ===
- Intlo Ramayya Veedhilo Krishnayya (1982)
- Tarangini (1982)
- Aalaya Sikharam (1983)
- Mukku Pudaka (1983)
- Simhapuri Simham (1983)
- Poratam (1983)
- Rangula Puli (1983)
- Maa Intiki Randi (1983)
- Gudachari No.1 (1983)
- Adigo Alladigo (1984)
- Aada Puli (1984)
- Danavudu (1984)
- Adarsavanthudu (1984)
- Mangamma Gari Manavadu (1984)
- Bandee (1985)
- Maa Pallelo Gopaludu (1985)
- Moodilla Muchchata (1985)
- Muddula Krishnayya (1986)
- Attagaaroo Swagatam (1986)
- Mannemlo Monagadu (1986)
- Jail Pakshi (1986)
- Challani Ramayya Chakkani Sitamma (1986)
- Muvva Gopaludu (1987)
- Talambralu (1987)
- Udayam (1987)
- Dongodochchadu (1987)
- Srinivasa Kalyanam (1987)
- Donga Kapuram (1987)
- Inti Donga (1987)
- Murali Krishnudu (1988)
- Station Master (1988)
- Aahuthi (1988)
- Chuttalabbayi (1988)
- Bharatamlo Bala Chandrudu (1988)
- Manavadostunnaadu (1988)
- Doragaarintlo Dongodu (1988)
- Goonda Rajyam (1989)
- Atta Mechchina Alludu (1989)
- Muddula Mavayya (1989)
- Bala Gopaludu (1989)
- Vintha Dongalu (1989)
- Soggadi Kapuram (1989)
- Bhale Dampathulu (1989)
- Gudachari 117 (1989)
- Muddula Menalludu (1990)
- Rao Gari Intlo Rowdy (1990)
- Ankusam (1990)
- 20va Sathabdam (1990)
- Sila Sasanam (1990)
- Vimukti (1991)
- Manavude Mahaneeyudu (1991)
- Sathruvu (1991)
- Madhura Nagarilo (1991)
- Bharat Bandh (1991)
- Tarangalu (1991)
- Bharatam (1992)
- Allari Pilla (1992)
- Gang War (1992)
- Pellam Chebite Vinaali (1992)
- Rajadhani (1993)
- Police Lockup (1993)
- Aavesam (1994)
- Lady Boss (1994)
- Captain (1994)
- Maa Voori Maaraju (1994)
- Ammoru (1995)
- Rikshavodu (1995)
- Godfather (1995)
- Aasti Mooredu Aasa Baaredu (1995)
- Chilakapachcha Kaapuram (1995)
- Maa Aavida Collector (1996)
- Lathi Charge (1996)
- Railway Coolie (1996)
- Mama Bagunnava (1997)
- Ratha Yatra (1997)
- Dongaata (1997)
- Pelli (1997)
- Pelli Pandiri (1997)
- Panjaram (1997)
- Pelli Kanuka (1998)
- Daddy Daddy (1998)
- Devi (1999)
- Bharata Ratna (1999)
- Panchadara Chilaka (1999)
- Maa Balaji (1999)
- Aavide Syamala (1999)
- Devullu (2000)
- Devi Putrudu (2001)
- Navvuthu Bathakalira (2001)
- Railway Coolie (2001)
- Kalisi Naduddam (2001)
- Jenda (2002)
- Pilisthe Palukutha (2002)
- Trinetram (2002)
- Puttintiki Ra Chelli (2004)
- Anji (2004)
- Ayodhya (2005)
- Keelu Gurram (2005)
- Nayakudu (2005)
- Dongodi Pelli (2006)
- Arundhati (2009)
- Avatharam (2014)
- Nagarahavu (2016; Kannada)

=== Associate director ===
- Korikale Gurralayite? (1979)

=== Actor ===
- Mudilla Muchata (1985)
- Attagaaroo Swagatam (1986)
- Inti Donga (1987)
- Trimurthulu (1987) as himself
- Atha Mechina Alludu (1989) as Buchi Babu
- Chevilo Puvvu (1990) as himself
- Aasti Mooredu Aasa Baaredu (1995)
- Dongaata (1997)
- Rainbow (2008)
