= Chetan Kumar =

Indian actor (born 1983)

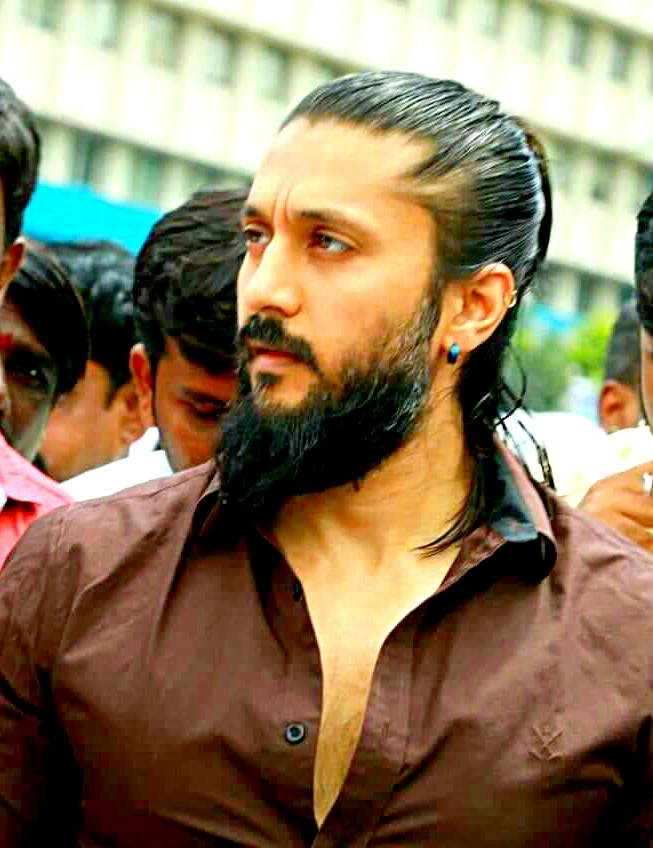
- Born: 24 February 1983 (age 43); Chicago, Illinois, United States
- Other name: Chetan Ahimsa
- Citizenship: American (1983 - present); Overseas Indian (2018 - present)
- Education: Yale University
- Occupations: Actor; social worker; activist
- Years active: 2007–present
- Spouse: Megha Shrivastav (m. 2020)

Chetan Kumar (born 24 February 1983), also known as Chetan Ahimsa, is an American actor who primarily works in Kannada cinema in India, He is also a social activist and public intellectual. He made his acting debut in the critically acclaimed gangster drama Aa Dinagalu (2007), which earned him the Udaya Film Award for Best Debut Actor. Over the years, he has appeared in notable films such as Myna (2013), Noorondu Nenapu (2017), and Ranam (2021), often choosing roles that reflect social realities and unconventional narratives.

Beyond cinema, Chetan is widely recognized for his activism rooted in Ambedkarite philosophy and egalitarian ideals. He has championed causes related to caste abolition, gender equality, LGBTQIA rights, tribal welfare, and environmental justice. His initiatives include rehabilitation for Endosulfan victims, housing for displaced tribal communities, and advocacy for minority status for Lingayats. He has also been a vocal critic of Hindutva Politics and superstition, positioning himself as a progressive voice in Karnataka's socio-political landscape.

Chetan's outspoken activism has led to multiple controversies and legal challenges. He was arrested in 2021 for remarks critical of Brahmanism and again in 2022 for a tweet against a Karnataka High Court judge during the hijab row. In 2023, the Indian government revoked his Overseas Citizenship of India status, because of his alleged ‘anti-national’ activities and derogatory comments against judges. Later, Karnataka High Court stays cancellation of actor Chetan Kumar's OCI card.

== Early and personal life ==
Chetan was born on 24 February 1983 into an Indian family. He grew up in Chicago, Illinois and completed high school as the valedictorian at Marist High School. His father relocated to USA after studying medicine.

Kumar graduated from Yale University in South Asian Studies with an emphasis on comparative theater in 2005. Upon completing his studies in 2005, Kumar was awarded a twelve-month Fulbright Scholarship to Karnataka, India. During this time, he collaborated with the National School of Drama in Bangalore.

Chetan Kumar married his long-time partner Megha on 2 February 2020. Their wedding ceremony was held in an orphanage. It received praise for innovative initiatives such as a plantable (seed paper) invitation card. The ceremony was presided over by Akkai Padmashali, a transgender activist. The couple gifted the Indian Constitution to their guests.

== Career ==
=== Initial career: theatre work ===
Before entering films, Chetan was actively involved in theatre. He performed in plays such as Sooryasthadinda Sooryodayadavarage and Maadhavana Sallapa with Bengaluru's Vistara group, which honed his craft and deepened his engagement with Kannada language and culture.

=== 2007-2010: Debut and breakthrough ===
Chetan made his Kannada film debut in 2007 with Aa Dinagalu, directed by K. M. Chaitanya. The crime drama, based on real-life underworld events of the 1980s, earned critical acclaim and commercial success. His portrayal of Chethan Naayak won him the Udaya Film Award for Best Debut Actor (Male), establishing him as a promising talent in the industry.

Following his debut, Chetan appeared in films such as Birugaali (2009) and Suryakaanti (2010). While these projects did not replicate the success of his debut, they showcased his versatility in romantic and action genres.

=== 2011-2020: Critical acclaim and notable works ===
In 2012, Chetan starred in Dashamukha, a multi-narrative film inspired by Sidney Lumet’s 12 Angry Men. His performance was praised for its intensity, though the film had a limited box-office impact.

His most celebrated role came in 2013 with Myna, a poignant love story where he played a college student who pretends to be disabled as part of a social experiment. The film became a box-office hit and earned Chetan widespread recognition for his sensitive portrayal.

Subsequent projects included Noorondu Nenapu (2017), a nostalgic drama set in the 1980s, and Athiratha (2017), which faced political backlash due to Chetan’s outspoken activism. The film faced opposition from right-wing extremists who tore down posters and prevented its screening, citing Kumar's political stances. Despite controversies, his commitment to meaningful cinema remained evident.

=== 2021-present: Limited presence ===
In 2021, Chetan appeared in Ranam, an action thriller directed by V. Samudra. The film, which also starred Chiranjeevi Sarja and Varalaxmi Sarathkumar, revolved around four students taking on corrupt politicians to address farmers’ issues. Chetan played a revolutionary figure aiding their cause. While the film received mixed reviews for its execution, it was noted for its socially conscious theme and marked one of Chetan's significant roles in the post-2017 period.

== Activism ==
Chetan identifies as an Ambedkarite and espouses the ideas of the Buddha, Basava, Ambedkar, Phule, and Periyar. He supports various social causes and has been involved in activist initiatives, including:

- Rehabilitation Fund for Endosulfan Victims (2013)
- Building Homes for Evicted Tribals (2016)
- Film Industry for Rights and Equality (2017)
- Advocacy for the Kadugolla Community (2018)
- Minority Status for Lingayats (2018)
- Panelist for Socio-Political Discussions
- Tipu and Hindutva
- Anti-Superstition Campaign (2014)
- LGBTQIA Advocacy (2016)
- Environmental Activism
- Social Solidarity Movements:

In 2022, Chetan was arrested for his tweet regarding Justice Krishna Dixit, who was presiding over the hijab issue in the Karnataka High Court.

=== Rehabilitation ===
Chetan supported successful demands for 24-hour medical care and a monthly compensation increase for Endosulfan victims in Karnataka's coastal belt. The objective was to raise the compensation from Rs. 1,000 to Rs. 3,000-5,000.

Chetan helped rehabilitate 3,000 Coorg tribals who were unlawfully displaced. As part of the campaign, homes were constructed near Kushalnagara.

In April 2018, the Bharatiya Janata Party (BJP) officially claimed the Dhidalli struggle was "Naxalite-inspired" and listed Chetan as responsible. However, Chetan denied these allegations and argued that the Dhidalli protest was non-violent and constitutional. He called for an apology from the Law Minister and the BJP state President.

=== Lingayat independent religion ===
Chetan advocated for the recognition of an independent Lingayat religion based on the philosophy of Basava and Vachana literature. He participated in pro-Lingayat forums in locations such as Bengaluru, Kalaburagi, and Hassan. Additionally, he contributed to TV discussions and interviews to raise awareness and promote dialogue.

=== Kadugolla identity fight ===
Chetan played a role in the efforts to obtain state recognition for the Kadugolla community. The Kadugolla community consists of Kannada-speaking Adivasis who engage in sheep-rearing and have distinct cultural practices and religious practices. The Kadugolla community was eventually recognised by the state government.

=== Film industry for rights and equality (FIRE) ===
Chetan is the founder of Film Industry for Rights and Equality, an association based in the Kannada Film industry. Established in 2017, FIRE aims to address issues related to sexual harassment in the workplace, the livelihoods of film workers and technicians, and establishing a writers' guild. The association works towards creating a safe and equitable working environment within the Kannada Film industry.

=== Rural school instruction ===
Chetan was involved in teaching critical thinking and current events at a village school in Mullur. Starting in September 2005, he advocated academic techniques such as interactive sessions, discussion forums, writing assignments, guest speakers, and meta-syllabus-based studies.

=== Controversies ===
Chetan advocated for Dalit/Adivasi rights and promoting anti-caste ideologies. However, controversies arose over his statements and activities.

On June 6, 2021, Chetan posted a quote of Ambedkar and Periyar regarding Brahminism as an ideology, which led to a complaint against him by Brahmin caste groups at Basavangudi Police Station.

In February 2022, Ahimsa was arrested for his alleged comments against a Karnataka High Court judge who was hearing a hijab case. The police took suo motu cognizance of his comments and arrested him, but he was later released on bail.

In October 2022, another First Information Report (FIR) was filed against Ahimsa by a right-wing extremist group for stating that Buta Kola, depicted in the film Kantara, was not part of a Hindu custom.

Ahimsa again faced arrest in March 2023 by the Bengaluru city police based on a complaint from a Bajrang Dal activist, accusing him of hurting religious sentiments with a tweet about Hindutva. The Karnataka Police's actions drew widespread criticism from human rights defenders.

On April 14, 2023, the Ministry of Home Affairs cancelled Chetan's Overseas Citizenship of India (OCI) status. However, the high court of Karnataka stayed the cancellation.

On April 25, 2026, Chetan Kumar made statements regarding the Dr. Rajkumar Samadhi land allocation. A police case was filed against his remarks.

=== Philanthropy ===
Chetan's philanthropic causes include:

- Karnataka flood relief efforts: Chetan participated in the flood relief efforts in Kodagu, Karnataka, in August 2018. He donated ration kits and essential supplies. He visited remote areas to provide relief materials.
- COVID-19 relief: During the pandemic, Chetan supported marginalized groups such as tribal communities and transgender individuals. He distributed ration and medical kits during the first and second pandemic waves.
- Cemetery workers: Chetan highlighted the demands of cemetery and crematorium workers. He urged state government to offer insurance coverage, increased pay, and recognition as government employees.

== Filmography ==
Key
†	Denotes films that have not yet been released

Year	Film	Role	Notes	Ref.
2007	Aa Dinagalu	Kumar	Udaya Film Award for Best Debut Actor	
2009	Raam	Himself	Cameo	
2009	Birugaali	Hacchi		
2010	Suryakaanti	Rohith / Surya		
2012	Dashamukha	Agni		
2013	Myna	Sathyamurthy		
2017	Noorondu Nenapu	Shreyas Bahaddur		
2017	Athiratha	Akash		
2021	Ranam	Satyagrahi		
2026	100 Crores†	TBA	Telugu-Kannada film, Post-production	
