= Panchakshari =

- Directed by: V. Samudra
- Produced by: Bommadevara Ramachandra Rao
- Starring: Anushka Shetty; Samrat Reddy; Chandramohan; Nassar; Pradeep Rawat
- Cinematography: Vasu
- Edited by: Marthand K. Venkatesh
- Music by: Chinna
- Release date: 11 June 2010
- Country: India
- Language: Telugu

Panchakshari is a 2010 Indian Telugu-language fantasy action film directed by V. Samudra and starring Anushka Shetty. The film was theatrically released on 11 June 2010. It was dubbed in Kannada under the same name, in Tamil as Panchamukhi and in Hindi as Vaishnavi.

== Plot ==
Udayshankar Verma and his pregnant wife, Parvati, give birth to a baby girl near a temple of Goddess Durga in a rural village. The Priest names the child Panchakshari. Since she was born on a day and time considered auspicious to Goddess Durga, she is treated as a divine personality by the people of her village. She grows up to be revered by the villagers and is subsequently married to an orphan, Sriram/Rajesh Sharma. After some time the couple becomes parents to a baby girl and name her Reshmi. During the holy festival of Bonalu, Panchakshari is possessed by Goddess Durga, who predicts that Panchakshari is going to die suddenly. The prophecy comes true as Panchakshari is immediately engulfed by fire, shattering the villagers and rendering Reshmi unconscious.

While in the city, Sriram comes across Panchakshari's look-alike, Honey, an ultra modern city girl from a rich family. He follows her around, videotaping her movements, which earns the dislike of Honey. But she understands the truth behind his act when Sriram tells her about Panchakshari. To make Reshmi gain her consciousness back, Sriram brings Honey to her. Honey visits the village where she discovers that she and Panchakshari are actually cousins.

Later on, it is revealed that Panchakshari was killed in order to close and make people stay away from the temple to execute the villain's plan of digging the treasure. Honey goes to the temple where Panchakshari died and gets possessed by Panchakshari who scares the diggers away and paralyzes the villain's wife. The villain's team try to get Panchakshari's spirit out of Honey's body with the help of an evil tantric sadhu, but fail. They also terrorize the villagers who pray to Goddess Durga to save them. Eventually the Goddess herself comes into Panchakshari and kills the villain. The villagers rush to the spot to get the blessings of the Great Goddess. As she blesses everyone, she leaves the body of Panchakshari. And later, Panchakshari is out of Honey's body and her soul finally finds peace.

== Cast ==
- Anushka Shetty as Panchakshari/Honey/Goddess Durga triple role
- Samrat Reddy as Sriram/Rajesh
- Giri Babu as Rama Chandra Murthy
- Chandra Mohan as Udayshankar Verma, Panchakshari's father,
- Nassar as Vijayshankar Verma, Honey's father
- Pradeep Rawat as Radeep/Billa Bhai
- Jayavani as Billa Bhai's Wife
- Telangana Shakuntala as Honey's paternal aunt
- Divyavani
- Brahmanandam as Kala Bhairava
- Raghu Babu as Billa Bhai's henchman
- Ravi Prakash
- Sudha
- Fish Venkat
- Banerjee
- Jeeva
- Stunt Silva as Kundalika
- Rajitha

== Soundtrack ==
Music: S. Rajeshwara Rao (Chinna)

=== Telugu track list ===
| Song title | Singers |
|---|---|
| "Aigiri Nandini" | Priyadarshini |
| "Ne Lookkeste Luckele" | Geetha Madhuri |
| "Panchakshirike Kalyanam" | K. S. Chithra |
| "Nagendra Haraya" | Mano |

=== Tamil track list ===
| Song title | Singers |
|---|---|
| "Ayigiri Nandini" | Shravya |
| "Ne Lookkeste Luckele" | Geetha Madhuri, Malathi |
| "Panchakshirike Kalyanam" | K. S. Chithra |
| "Nagendre Haraya" | Mano |

== Critical reception ==
A critic from The Times of India gave the film 2/5 stars and wrote, "Anushka tries to salvage two poorly etched roles but her efforts could go in vain due to a shabbily-penned screenplay. [...] Barring the last gripping 10 minutes, the socio-fantasy has nothing much to offer." Radhika Rajamani of Rediff gave it 1.5/5 stars and wrote, "The story is not clear till almost the end of the first half of the film. [...] Panchakshari may give Anushka a boost on account of her acting but as a film, it falls below expectations with a run-of-the-mill, weak and out-of-date script."
