= Adivishnu =

- DVD cover
- Directed by: Bharat Parepalli
- Written by: Dasari Narayana Rao; P. Rajendra Kumar (dialogues)
- Starring: Dasari Arun Kumar; Sneha
- Cinematography: T. Surendra Reddy
- Edited by: B. Krishnamraju
- Music by: M. M. Srilekha
- Release date: 21 August 2008
- Country: India
- Language: Telugu

Adivishnu is a 2008 Indian Telugu-language action drama film directed by Bharat Parepalli, written by Dasari Narayana Rao and starring Dasari Arun Kumar and Sneha.

== Cast ==
- Dasari Arun Kumar as Vishnu
- Sneha as Anjali
- Suman as Manservant
- Pradeep Rawat as Yadagiri
- Kota Srinivasa Rao as Vishnu's father
- Aishwarya as Jakkamma
- Jeeva as Investigation officer
- Dharmavarapu Subramanyam
- Ali
- Venu Madhav
- Satyam Rajesh
- Sunil as Subbarao
- M. S. Narayana
- M. Balayya
- Prema as Prema
- Surekha Vani
- Fish Venkat
- Venu Yeldandi
- Vizag Prasad

== Production ==
This film marked the return of Dasari Arun Kumar in a lead role after a brief hiatus. The film completed shooting as of mid-2008.

== Soundtrack ==
The music was composed by M. M. Srilekha. The audio launch for the film was held on 27 July 2008 at the Taj Deccan hotel in Hyderabad with celebrities including Rajinikanth, Mohan Babu, Rajasekhar, Manchu Manoj, Jeevitha, K. Raghavendra Rao, N. Shankar, Muthyala Subbaiah, Suresh Krissna, S. V. Krishna Reddy, C. Aswini Dutt, Murali Mohan, Kaikala Satyanarayana and Vadde Ramesh in attendance. All songs were penned by Chandrabose except the song "Ramaa Ramaa" which Bhaskarabhatla wrote.

- "Aadi Naa Manase Needhi" - Rita, S.P. Balasubrahmanyam
- "Edu Rangula Harivillu" - K.S. Chithra, Srinivas
- "Ee Pani Chesthunna" - Murali, K.S. Chithra
- "Peechu Meetai" - Sukhwinder Singh, Sangeetha Rajeev
- "Ramaa Ramaa" - Tippu
