= Vijayadasami (film) =

- Theatrical release poster
- Directed by: V. Samudra
- Story by: Perarasu
- Based on: Sivakasi (Tamil)
- Produced by: Edara Rangarao
- Starring: Kalyan Ram Nandamuri; Vedhika; Sai Kumar
- Cinematography: C. Ramprasad
- Edited by: Nandamuri Hari
- Music by: Srikanth Deva (songs); Deva (score)
- Production company: Sai Sarvajit Movies
- Distributed by: Sai Sarvajit Movies Release
- Release date: September 21, 2007 (India)
- Running time: 165 minutes
- Country: India
- Language: Telugu

Vijayadasami is a 2007 Indian Telugu-language action film directed by V. Samudra. A remake of the 2005 Tamil film Sivakasi, it stars Kalyan Ram Nandamuri, Vedhika and Sai Kumar. Vedhika made her Telugu cinema debut with this film, while Srikanth Deva also composed the soundtrack for Sivakasi that was reused in this film, however the background score of the film also reused from Sivakasi, which was composed by his father Deva.

The film was released on 21 September 2007, receiving negative reviews from critics. It was a commercial failure, and Kalyan Ram himself was not satisfied with the film's execution by Samudra. The film had an international DVD release on 25 April 2008. During a Facebook live session in 2018, Kalyan Ram said he regretted doing this film because he was not confident about it but had to take it in spite of demanding changes that weren't made.

== Plot ==
The film follows Sivakasi, a welder and is in love with a girl called Devi. later, he is forced to reveal his tragic past to his girlfriend after being attacked by her suspecting brothers. He now must confront his brother Durga Prasad who ruined his life years ago as a child.

== Cast ==
- Kalyan Ram as Sivakasi/Chennamaneni Shakthi
- Vedhika as Devi
- Sai Kumar as Chennamaneni Durga Prasad
- Suman as Chennamaneni Rajeswara Rao
- Paruchuri Venkateswara Rao as 'Hyundai' Hanumanth Rao
- Giri Babu as Krishna Rao
- Jayasudha as Chennamaneni Mahalakshmi
- Brahmanandam as PP, Sivakasi's friend
- Rajan P. Dev as Kodanti Koteshwar Rao
- Srinivasa Reddy as Shakthi's friend
- Duvvasi Mohan as Sivakasi's friend
- Suman Setty as Sivakasi's friend
- AVS as Gundu Vinayaka Rao
- Allari Subhashini as Sub-inspector of police
- Lakshmipati as Durga Prasad's right-hand man
- Sravan as Devi's brother
- Pavala Syamala
- Gautam Raju
- Mounica as Aishwarya

Cameo appearance

- Simran as herself in the song "Cine Tara"
- V. Samudra as himself

== Production ==
The story was written by Perarasu who also wrote and directed the original film, while the Paruchuri brothers wrote the dialogues. Ram Prasad handled the cinematography, while Nandamuri Hari edited the film and Stun Siva choreographed the action sequences. Kalyan Ram decided to star in the film after watching the Tamil original in Vizag. The film was shot at a specially erected street set in Ramanaidu Cine Village, Hyderabad. The climax scenes were shot for a week at Ramoji Film City.

== Soundtrack ==
The soundtrack was composed by Srikanth Deva and released by Aditya Music. All of the songs were reused from Sivakasi.

Vijayadasami

Soundtrack album by Srikanth Deva
- Released: 2007
- Recorded: 2007
- Genre: Soundtrack
- Length: 29:52
- Label: Aditya Music
- Producer: Srikanth Deva

Srikanth Deva chronology
Piragu (2007)	Vijayadasami (2007)	Naalaiya Pozhuthum Unnodu (2007)

Track list
No.	Title	Lyrics	Singer(s)	Length
1.	"Raa Raa"	Abhinaya Srinivas	Shankar Mahadevan	5:25
2.	"Arey Kalyana"	Abhinaya Srinivas	Udit Narayan, Anuradha Sriram	4:46
3.	"Idho Oka"	Ananta Sriram	Sujatha, Harish Raghavendra	5:03
4.	"Deepavali"	Eshwar Teja	Naveen, Vasundhara Das	4:34
5.	"Devathaku"	Guru Charan	S. P. Balasubrahmanyam	4:31
6.	"Cine Tara"	Velpula Venkatesh	Mano, Swarnalatha	5:33
Total length:				29:52

== Reception ==
A reviewer from Rediff.com stated the film "offers nothing new".
