= Simharasi =

2001 film by V. Samudra

- Directed by: V. Samudra
- Written by: Paruchuri Brothers
- Screenplay by: V. Samudra
- Story by: Surya Prakash
- Produced by: R. B. Choudary
- Starring: Rajasekhar; Sakshi Shivanand
- Cinematography: Shyam K. Naidu
- Music by: S. A. Rajkumar
- Release date: 6 July 2001
- Running time: 150 minutes
- Country: India
- Language: Telugu

Simharasi is a 2001 Indian Telugu-language drama film directed by V. Samudra and produced by R. B. Choudary. It stars Rajasekhar and Sakshi Shivanand. It is a remake of the Tamil film Maayi.

== Plot ==
Narasimharaju is a well-respected, do-gooder in a village. He considers women in the village as his sisters and even helps financially to conduct their weddings. He is a man who is ready to kill his father Irulandi when he learns that he had a second wife. But the father opts to kill himself rather than face his son and so, Narasimharaju brings his stepsister Lakshmi to live with him. A local MLA comes to Narasimharaju to obtain his support during the upcoming election, but he refuses and the MLA loses the election. But his son, who admires Narasimharaju, marries Lakshmi. Meanwhile, Bhuvaneswari, Narasimharaju's distant relative's daughter comes to the village from Bangalore and she initially misunderstands Narasimharaju by seeing his looks but later realizes her mistake after knowing about Narasimharaju's hard work and his help towards improving the village. Narasimharaju has built free hospital, day care center, college etc. to help the villagers. Bhuvaneshwari is attracted towards Narasimharaju and proposes him but Narasimharaju does not accept her love. But Bhuvana remains confident about marrying Narasimharaju following which he tells his flashback. Narasimharaju was born into a very poor family where his mother was infected by leprosy even before Narasimharaju's birth. Due to poor financial condition, his mother could not be treated in hospital and instead was kept alone in a room. She was not allowed to touch her son Narasimharaju fearing chances of the disease being spread. Narasimharaju has never seen his mother right from his childhood as she always stays in a closed room. When Narasimharaju was eight years old, his mother is further frustrated more as her disease prevents her to show her affection towards Narasimharaju and she drowns herself in a river. This shocks Narasimharaju and he decides not to marry any woman as he does not want any girl to touch his body which was even untouched by his beloved mother.

Narasimharaju convinces Bhuvaneshwari to marry someone else. Also, Narasimharaju discovers that his stepsister Lakshmi is being tortured by her husband and it was all a plan to take revenge on Narasimharaju for not supporting the local MLA during elections. Narasimharaju beats up Lakshmi's husband and says that he will never support criminal activities even if it impacts his family. On the day of Bhuvaneshwari's wedding, the bride groom's family misunderstands that Narasimharaju and Bhuvaneshwari are lovers seeing Narasimharaju's dhoti in her room and stops the marriage. Bhuvaneshwari's friend discloses the truth that Narasimharaju gave his dhoti to safeguard her when her dresses were washed away in water sometime back. Manorama who also belongs the village shouts at the groom's family for their cruel thoughts and she requests Narasimharaju to marry Bhuvaneshwari as that would be the right thing. Narasimharaju obeys Manorama's words as his mother's and marries Bhuvaneshwari.

== Cast ==
- Rajasekhar as Narasimharaju
  - Master Mahendra as young Narasimharaju
- Sakshi Shivanand as Rajeswari
- Anandaraj as Vijayendra Prasad
- Vindhya
- Varsha
- Vijayakumar as Narasimharaju's father
- Sabitha Anand as Narasimharaju's mother
- Giri Babu
- Brahmanandam as Ram Brahmmam
- M S Narayana as Loose Basavayya
- Achyuth as Hari Prasad
- Venu Madhav
- Manorama
- Narra Venkateswara Rao
- Kovai Sarala
- Chalapathi Rao
- Ponnambalam as Police Inspector
- Bandla Ganesh
- Gautam Raju as Police officer
- Ananth as Police officer

== Production ==
Balakrishna was originally approached for the film but he turned it down. The film was launched on 5 February 2001 at Annapurna Studios. The songs were shot at Ooty, Mysore and Kodaikanal.

== Soundtrack ==
Simharasi

Soundtrack album by S. A. Rajkumar
- Released: 2001
- Recorded: 2001
- Genre: Soundtrack
- Length: 22:39
- Label: Aditya Music
- Producer: S. A. Rajkumar

Music was composed by S. A. Rajkumar and released on Aditya Music. Two songs ("Rani Rani" and "Amma Ane") from the original film Maayi were retained from the songs "Ola Ola" and "Sooriyane", respectively. "Pedalante" and "Sathyabhama" was remade from Rajkumar's own songs "Pachcha Mannu" and "Kumbakonam Sandhai" from Tamil film of same name. "Telusa Nesthama" was remade from Rajkumar's own song "Enakkoru Snehithi" from Priyamaanavale.

Track List
No.	Title	Lyrics	Singer(s)	Length
1.	"Pedalante"	Venigalla Rambabu	S. P. Balasubrahmanyam, Sujatha	4:04
2.	"Telusa Nesthama"	Venigalla Rambabu	Hariharan, Sujatha	4:59
3.	"Satyabhama"	Pothula Ravikiran	Udit Narayan, Sujatha	4:30
4.	"Amma Ane Pilichi"	Sirivennela Sitaramasastri	S. Janaki	4:28
5.	"Rani Rani"	Vijaykumar	S. P. Balasubrahmanyam, Swarnalatha	4:38
Total length:				22:39

== Reception ==
Sify wrote "Dr Rajasekhar has always been a narcissist and his films reeks off male chauvinism. Simharasi is no different from his earlier movies. It is a remake of the Tamil film Maayi. Like it on not, in terms of its story idea, scripting, direction and well virtually on every aspect it leaves you exasperated". Idlebrain wrote "V Samudra has shown the brilliance in holding the weak story together and dishing out an interesting film. He has done a fairly good job in doing what he was entrusted upon: remaking a Tamil film with Telugu nativity without changing the original story line. V Samudra knows the pulses of the masses". Andhra Today wrote "The movie has been hyped up too much for the commercial value with too many unrelated scenes, landing the audience in confusion. Narasimharaju's character portrayal could have been well delineated in three or four scenes, rather than dragging it till the very end. Attention to detail in each scene, by the director will keep the audience glued to their seats, especially Narasimharaju's flashback".
