= Chandi (film) =

- Directed by: V. Samudra
- Produced by: Srinivas Babu
- Starring: Priyamani; Krishnam Raju; R. Sarathkumar
- Cinematography: Vasu
- Edited by: Nandamuri Hari
- Music by: Ravi Shankar; Chinna
- Production company: OMICS Creations
- Release date: 8 November 2013
- Country: India
- Language: Telugu

Chandi is a 2013 Indian Telugu film directed by V. Samudra starring Priyamani, Krishnam Raju, and R. Sarathkumar.

It is loosely based on the Hollywood movie The Long Kiss Goodnight, and was remade in Bhojpuri in 2015 as Durga starring Rani Chaterjee and in Bangladesh in 2016 as Rokto starring Pori Moni.

== Cast ==
- Priyamani as Ganga a.k.a. Chandee
- Krishnam Raju as Ashok Gajapati Raju
- R. Sarathkumar as Chandrasekhar Azad
- Brahmanandam as Satyanarayana
- Ashish Vidyarthi as Minister
- Vinod Kumar Alva as IAS Officer Rao
- Nagendra Babu as CBI Officer
- Ranganath as Judge
- Posani Krishna Murali as Inspector Gabbar Singh
- G. V. Sudhakar Naidu as Assistant Commissioner
- Supreeth as Minister's accomplice
- Giri Babu as Chief Minister
- Chandra Mohan as Police Retired Constable
- M. S. Narayana
- Ali as Cherry
- Thagubothu Ramesh as Driver
- Telangana Shakuntala
- Gundu Hanumantha Rao
- Kondavalasa Lakshmana Rao
- Satyam Rajesh as Chandee's friend
- Chitram Srinu as Chandee's friend
- Kadambari Kiran as Constable
- Chammak Chandra as Constable
- Dasanna as Constable
- Prabhas Sreenu
- Raju
- Scarlett Mellish Wilson in an item number

== Production ==
The film was formally launched on 31 January 2013, with principal photography commencing on 30 October 2012. Filming took place over eight months, primarily across Hyderabad, Rajamundry and Bangkok, Thailand.

== Soundtrack ==
Chandee

Soundtrack album
- Recorded: 2013
- Genre: Film soundtrack
- Length: 24:43
- Label: Chandee

All music is composed by NR Sankar and Chinna.

Track listing
No.	Title	Lyrics	Singer(s)	Length
1.	"Alluri Seetharama Raju"	Ramajogayya Sastry	Kailash Kher	5:15
2.	"Ganga Ganga"	Ramajogayya Sastry	Harini	4:52
3.	"A=Appla la unta"	Bhaskara Batla Ravi Kumar	Ramya NSK	4:53
4.	"Chall Chall"	Chandrabose	Bhargavi Pillai	4:11
5.	"Chandi Chandee"	Ramajogayya Sastry	Bhargavi Pillai	3:59
6.	"Uure leduga"	Ramajogayya Sastry	Bhargavi Pillai	2:53
Total length:				24:43

== Release and reception ==
The film was originally scheduled for release in the first week of October 2013, but was postponed due to political unrest in Andhra Pradesh and finally released on 8 November 2013.

A critic from The Times of India rated the film 1.5/5 stars and wrote, "It’s a tediously trashy film that falls short of being an assault on your senses. Everything about the movie is so sloppy that, five minutes into the movie you realise this one’s going to be a pain".
