= Bharatasimha Reddy =

2002 Telugu language film

- DVD cover
- Directed by: Surya Prakash
- Written by: MVS Haranatha Rao (dialogues)
- Screenplay by: Surya Prakash
- Story by: Surya Prakash
- Produced by: Teja
- Starring: Rajasekhar; Meena; Gajala
- Cinematography: Mohammad Nazeer
- Edited by: Goutham Raju
- Music by: S. A. Rajkumar
- Production company: Teja Cinema
- Release date: 6 September 2002
- Country: India
- Language: Telugu

Bharatasimha Reddy is a 2002 Indian Telugu-language drama film directed by Surya Prakash, his debut in Telugu. The film stars Rajasekhar, Meena, Gajala and Ravali in lead roles, with Annapoorna, Gundu Hanumantha Rao, Narra Venkateswara Rao, Raghu Babu and Giri Babu playing supporting roles. The film, produced by Teja, had musical score by S. A. Rajkumar.

== Plot ==
Bharata Simha Reddy is story of father and son in which, Raja (Rajasekhar) is a wayward youth who hates his look-alike father Devudayya (Rajasekhar).

Raja lives away from his father and tells everybody that his father killed his mother and that he is now living with his stepmother. But Devudayya is very fond of his son and he provides food, shelter and other amenities to his son through another channel. Raja fell love with Gajala. Raja knows the truth about his father and he realizes and he unites his mother and father together.

== Cast ==
- Rajasekhar as Devudayya/Raja
- Meena as Devudayya's wife
- Gajala as Santhi
- Ravali as Kalyani
- Anandaraj as Devudayya's brother-in-law
- Narra Venkateswara Rao as Raja's step father
- Annapoorna as Raja's Step mother
- Raghu Babu
- Giri Babu
- Brahmanandam as Jandakapi Raju
- Rallapalli
- Bandla Ganesh
- Ramaraju
- Chitti Babu
- Sarika Ramachandra Rao
- KK Sarma
- Junior Relangi
- Anita Choudary as Devudayya's Sister
- Tanish

== Music ==
The film score and the soundtrack were composed by S. A. Rajkumar. The soundtrack, released in 2002, features six tracks with lyrics written by Murthy ES, Sai Harsha, Suddala Ashok Teja and Chandrabose.

S. No.	Song title	Lyrics	Singers	length
1	"Nacho Nacho"	chandrabose	Tippu	4:20
2	"Vennelave"	suddala ashok teja	S. P. Balasubrahmanyam	4:57
3	"Mucchatyna"	E.S.murthi	S. P. Balasubrahmanyam, Sujatha	3:59
4	"Ela Ela Elagayya"	sai sri harsha	S. P. Balasubrahmanyam	4:40
5	"Malli Malli"	E.S.murthi	rajesh,mahalakshmi	

== Reception ==
Vanaja of Telugucinema.com reviewed the film as a disappointing attempt by Rajasekhar, citing an unimpressive storyline, flat screenplay, and lacklustre performances, despite its family feud backdrop and multiple roles played by the actor. The Hindu wrote "Playing two prime roles, Rajasekhar is there all over the film. As Bharartasimha Reddy, a target of ridicule, he looks dull and clumsy. Gazala teams with Raja, and though attractive fails to make an impact. The characters played by Meena and Ravali have no sense at all. Music by S.A. Rajkumar is average". Sify wrote "Rajasekhar looks overage to play the son?s role. The film lacks a strong narrative and Meena who appears in his mother?s role looks unconvincing! In the second half the film looks like a tearjerker of the 60?s. The story is so weak that the film falters in the first half itself. It is definitely one of the most boring films of the year". Idlebrain wrote "Story of this film is an age old one. Screenplay adapted for this film stresses more on mass treatment and over dose of sentiment than sensible narration. Direction of the film is average". Full Hyderabad wrote "The director should get a crash course in the Reddy genre of movies. He should realize that lack of a story cannot be compensated by loads of melodrama".
