= Ravoyi Chandamama =

- Theatrical release poster
- Directed by: Jayanth C. Paranjee
- Written by: Satyanand (story / dialogues)
- Screenplay by: Jayanth C. Paranjee
- Produced by: C. Aswani Dutt
- Starring: Nagarjuna Akkineni; Jagapati Babu; Anjala Zhaveri; Keerthi Reddy
- Cinematography: Jayanan Vincent
- Edited by: Marthand K. Venkatesh
- Music by: Mani Sharma
- Production company: Vyjayanthi Movies
- Release date: 15 October 1999
- Running time: 174 minutes
- Country: India
- Language: Telugu

Raavoyi Chandamama (transl. Come On, Oh Moon) is a 1999 Indian Telugu-language romance film directed by Jayanth C. Paranjee. It stars Nagarjuna, Jagapathi Babu, Anjala Zhaveri, Keerthi Reddy, and the music was composed by Mani Sharma. The film was produced by C. Aswani Dutt under the Vyjayanthi Movies banner. The film's title is based on a song from Missamma (1955). Raavoyi Chandamama was not commercially successful.

The film is loosely based on the 1957 American film An Affair to Remember, which in turn was a remake of 1939 film Love Affair. The American film was also remade in Hindi as Mann which also released in 1999.

== Plot ==
The film begins in the United States, where Sasi, a renowned Indian pop singer, is conducting his music concerts. Meghana, a US-educated woman, resides with her uncle V. K. Sonty's family. Both Sasi and Meghana are engaged to others—Rukmini and Sujith, respectively—and eagerly looking forward to their arrival in India. Sasi and Meghana meet at a rave, where Meghana initially misjudges him as arrogant, leading to a series of misunderstandings.

The two embark on a cruise, the Leo Star, traveling from Singapore to Vizag. Amid humorous and lighthearted incidents, Meghana begins to recognize Sasi's kind nature, and the two form a bond. During a stopover in the Andaman Islands, Sasi takes Meghana to meet his grandmother, and they share a meaningful time together. As their relationship deepens, they realize they may be falling in love. Sasi, cautious of their feelings, suggests they take 90 days apart without any contact. He proposes they meet at the Vizag lighthouse if their feelings remain unchanged.

The cruise reaches Vizag, where Sasi and Meghana are reunited with their respective fiancés, Rukmini and Sujith. Despite their efforts to focus on their engagements, both struggle to suppress their emotions. As the 90-day period nears its end, Sasi, while visiting his ailing grandmother in Andaman, writes to Rukmini to explain his love for Meghana. On the final day, Meghana waits at the lighthouse, but Sasi, delayed by an accident, fails to arrive. Heartbroken, Meghana misinterprets his absence as rejection and agrees to marry Sujith.

After recovering, Sasi learns about Meghana's wedding and mistakenly believes she has moved on. On the wedding day, Sasi attends with Rukmini, and Meghana discovers the truth about his accident. Sasi performs a song, fulfilling a promise he made to Meghana, which prompts an emotional confrontation. Sujith realizes their love and magnanimously unites them. The film concludes with the joyous marriage of Sasi and Meghana.

== Cast ==
- Nagarjuna Akkineni as Sasi Kumar
- Jagapati Babu as Sujeeth
- Anjala Zhaveri as Meghana
- Keerthi Reddy as Rukmini
- Tanikella Bharani
- Giri Babu as Sujit's father
- Chandra Mohan as Meghana's father
- Ali as Sasi's friend
- Vivekvasu as Sasi's friend
- Venu Madhav as KVR
- M. S. Narayana as Servant
- AVS as V. K. Sonty
- Mallikarjuna Rao as Mallayya
- Ranganath as Meghana's uncle
- Raghunatha Reddy as Sundaram Murthy, Rukmini's father
- Maharshi Raghava as Meghana's brother
- Shavukar Janaki as Sasi's grandmother
- Kaushal Manda as Nikhil's friend
- Jhansi as Gowri
- Siva Parvathi as Meghana's aunt
- Sudha as Meghana's mother
- Rajitha as Meghana's aunt
- Indu Anand as Sujit's mother
- Baby Niharika as Dolly
- Aishwarya Rai as item number "Love To Live"

== Production ==
The film was partially shot in Canada.

== Soundtrack ==
Ravoyi Chandamama

Film score by Mani Sharma
- Released: 1999
- Genre: Soundtrack
- Length: 45:00
- Label: Supreme Music
- Producer: Mani Sharma

Mani Sharma chronology
Neti Gandhi (1998)	Ravoyi Chandamama (1999)	Seenu (1999)

The music was composed by Mani Sharma. Music is released on Supreme Music Company.

Telugu

No.	Title	Lyrics	Singer(s)	Length
1.	"Naa Kosame"	Chandrabose	Mano	5:35
2.	"Nanda Nandana"	Veturi	S. P. Balasubrahmanyam, Harini	4:14
3.	"Jagadajam Javani"	Veturi	K. S. Chithra, Shankar Mahadevan	4:13
4.	"Love To Live"	Veturi	Kavita Krishnamurthy, Sonu Nigam	6:06
5.	"Swapnavenuvedo"	Veturi	S. P. Balasubrahmanyam, K. S. Chithra	5:31
6.	"Jhummani Jhummani"	Veturi	S. P. Balasubrahmanyam	4:20
7.	"Letha Letha"	Veturi	S. P. Balasubrahmanyam, K. S. Chithra	5:28
8.	"Mallepoova"	Veturi	S. P. Balasubrahmanyam, K. S. Chithra	4:38
9.	"Gudu Gudu Gunjam"	Sirivennela Sitarama Sastry	Sukhwinder Singh, Smita, Lalitha, Sagari	4:27
Total length:				45:00

Hindi (Dubbed Version) — Sanam Tere Hain Hum

No.	Title	Singer(s)	Length
1.	"Hai Koi Hindustani"	Abhijeet Bhattacharya	5:35
2.	"Jane Tammana Tumse"	Chandana Dixit, Jolly Mukherjee	4:14
3.	"Pyar Ho Gaya Hai Hume"	Vinod Rathod, Chandana Dixit	4:13
4.	"Love To Live"	Kavita Krishnamurthy, Abhijeet Bhattacharya	6:06
5.	"Tu Hi Meri Manzil"	Kumar Sanu, Kavita Krishnamurthy	5:31
6.	"Tumne Thodi Sunlo Mere Harjai"	Vinod Rathod	4:20
7.	"Seene Se Laga Le Mujkho"	Abhijeet Bhattacharya, Chandana Dixit	5:28
8.	"Tum Mile Ho Mujhe"	Chandana Dixit, Abhijeet Bhattacharya	4:00
9.	Untitled		4:27

== Reception ==
Jeevi of Idlebrain wrote, "First half of this film is decent. But the second half is unbearable. Director seems to have lost grip on the film in the second half and tried to wind it up by rushing to the climax at a brisk pace and made the viewer feel clueless and uncomfortable". Deccan Herald noted, "It's surprising how directors take viewers for fools. In Ravoyee... the director has done just that. In fact he deserves a pat on the back for his ability to take viewers for a ride". Sify wrote "The film proves a point that big budget and heavily loaded star-cast is not enough to sustain the audience interest, there has to be a solid narrative in the form of a thoroughly worked out screenplay. For Nag fans it is a disappointing fare".
