= Manikkam =

1996 film directed by K. V. Pandian

- Theatrical release poster
- Directed by: K. V. Pandian
- Written by: K. V. Pandian
- Produced by: T. Siva
- Starring: Rajkiran; Vanitha Vijayakumar
- Cinematography: Ravishankar
- Edited by: Ashok Mehta
- Music by: Karthik Raja
- Production company: Amma Creations
- Release date: 7 September 1996
- Country: India
- Language: Tamil

Manikkam (transl. Ruby) (Note: Also the title character.) is a 1996 Indian Tamil-language action drama film directed by Surya Prakash (credited as K. V. Pandian) in his debut and produced by T. Siva. The film stars Rajkiran and Vanitha Vijayakumar, while Vinu Chakravarthy and Gandhimathi play supporting roles. It was released on 7 September 1996.

== Plot ==
The story of “Manikkam” is based on the Tamil religious belief of yesteryear heroes, brave-hearts, warriors (“veerargal”) eventually becoming worshipped as sub-deities and believed to become “protectors” of villages. These are locally known as “kaval deivangal”, or “guardian gods”. Manikkam (Rajkiran) is a protector (kaaval) of many local villages, but he resides at a village in Vadipatti.

Manikkam is believed to get the “arul vakku” from the local Neethi Amman kovil and operates accordingly. Meanwhile, local villagers are terrorized by Karuvayan (Mansoor Ali Khan) and the gang from a local town called Vakkanoor. Karuvayan is a ruthless bandit that thrives on the livelihood of stealing from others and selling arrack. The heroine Savithri (Vanitha Vijayakumar) comes back home from London and resides with her grandmother (Jayanthi); Savithri's “thai maaman” Anandaraj is a local goon who also makes money illicitly and utilizes Karuvayan and the Vakkanoor gang to handle business. Manikkam has many brothers and sisters and while he is the “kaaval” for many villages, he eventually becomes a “kaaval” for Savithri's village. Despite guarding villages, Manikkam has a responsibility of getting his 8 sisters married.

On a stroll through the village in Achanampatti, Savithri encounters the Karuppasamy kovil and asks why it is locked up; Savithri's grandmother explains that 5 years ago during a festival, Anandaraj was angry that he did not get the “parivattam” (a form of honor), so he ordered Karuvayan and Vakkanoor gang to kill the attendants and to lock the temple and ever since, nobody was able to attend the temple. Manikkam's father Virumandi (Vinu Chakravarthy) resides in Usilampatti and ends up marrying a 16-year-old girl, disgracing the family once more (he is married to many wives) and ruining a proposal for one of his daughters. Disgusted, Manikkam confronts his father about the marriage and a war of words leads to Manikkam getting kicked out his house with his siblings and grandmother Gandhimathi joining him.

Meanwhile, after Savithri meets Manikkam, her grandmother Jayanthi sends her to stay with Manikkam and his siblings, for her grandmother fears that she is not safe with Anandaraj around; when Anandaraj leaves town, she is hidden there. After learning more about Manikkam's soft nature, she eventually falls in love with him, desiring to marry him. One day Manikkam has an encounter with Karuvayan stealing from market merchants, and orders Karuvayan to give back the money he stole; this leads to a fight in which Karuvayan is beaten up by Manikkam. Savithri eventually expresses her love and desire to Manikkam, but Manikkam refuses as his obligations to getting his sisters married and village affairs are more important. Eventually Anandaraj finds out of Savithri's love for Manikkam and threatens for her to marry him instead.

When Savithri is again hidden with Manikkam's family, Anandaraj comes to find out, brings her back and locks her in a room. Savithri's grandmother goes to the Neethi Amman kovil to tie a knot (wishful request) and Manikkam gets the word to free Savithri; Anandaraj confronts him with his goons and Manikkam defeats all of them. Eventually, Manivannan makes his way into the film as a criminal that was just released from the Palayamkottai jail; he eventually meets Karuvayan and they become friends. Karuvayan introduces Manivannan to Anandraj and they devise a plan to defeat Manikkam; Manivannan already had an aim to go after Manikkam's father for marrying his 16-year-old sister, so there was a mutual hatred toward Manikkam.

Manikkam eventually marries off one of his sisters. The rest of his 7 sisters eventually get groom proposals, prompting a plan for a single marriage ceremony for all 7 girls. Meanwhile, Savithri's village elders get the “arul vaakku” to open the Karuppasamy temple and conduct the temple festival, with Manikkam supposedly being the one to lead the charge in that effort. This causes worry by his grandmother and siblings, knowing what happened when Anandaraj and the Vakkanoor gang killing anyone that tried to open up the temple, but Manikkam remained calm and moved forward since he received the arul vaakku. The night his sisters were getting married, Manivannan tricked Virumandi into stopping the wedding, but the grooms did not acknowledge his word and made it clear that they are marrying Manikkam's sisters.

After a big argument at the wedding, Savithri eventually talks sense into the wedding parties, which angers Manivannan and ends up stabbing her. Instead of going to the hospital, Savithri desires to see Manikkam as the temple festival is happening at the same night of the wedding. During the thiruvizha (festival), Manikkam gets into a trance and leads the way to open the temple. Anandraj, Karuvayan and Vakkanoor gang make their way into the crowd to stop Manikkam, but they were all beaten and killed, including Karuvayan and Anandraj. Manikkam successfully opens the Karuppasamy temple after 5 years and enters with other devotees, but the rest of the devotees outside were ambushed and slaughtered by more of the Vakkanoor gang that arrived onsite. Manikkam (still in the trance) gets word from a crying village elder about what Vakkanoor people did and then grabs the aruvaal (machete) and takes charge towards Vakkanoor.

Meanwhile, the wives of the Vakkanoor bandits approach Manikkam's mother (Srividya) and beg her to stop her son from slaughtering their husbands. Srividya eventually finds her son in a full trance, heading to Vakkanoor to go after the bandits; knowing that she cannot stop him, she talks as if she was the goddess and tells him to stop, which prompts Manikkam to completely stop, while he stands in full fury and anger; Pazhanichamy (local villager) informs Manikkam's mother of what Vakkanoor did and how Manikkam was going to serve justice; his mother realizes her fault and then runs back to her son, but not knowing where her path was, she falls into a well. Eventually his father Virumandi realizes his mistakes and falls at Manikkam's feet begging for forgiveness and eventually Savithri comes to him and dies at his feet. The movie ends with a large black statue of Manikkam in that same pose with the aruvaal and velkambu, as this is believed to be many years later and he is now adopted as a kaaval deivam like Karuppasamy, as this Tamil religious tradition passes on.

== Cast ==
- Rajkiran as Manikkam
- Vanitha Vijayakumar as Savithri
- Jayanthi as Grandma
- Manivannan
- Srividya
- Anandaraj
- Vijayachandrika
- Vinu Chakravarthy as Virumandi
- Gandhimathi
- Sarapambu Subburaj
- Vaiyapuri
- Vaishnavi
- Mansoor Ali Khan as Karuvayan

== Production ==
K. V. Pandian made his directorial debut through the film. He changed his name to Surya Prakash for subsequent ventures.

== Soundtrack ==
The soundtrack was composed by Karthik Raja. The song "Sandhanam Thechachu" became popular.

Song	Singers	Lyrics
"Sundararae Muzhu"	S. P. Balasubrahmanyam, Bhavatharini	Muthulingam
"Rakkamma Rakkamma"	S. P. Balasubrahmanyam, Swarnalatha	Paarthi Bhaskar
"Santhanam Theychachi"	Bhavatharini	Paarthi Bhaskar
"Unakku En Rasa"	P. Susheela	Vaamanan
"Thottu Sel Ilam"	Bhavatharini	Ilaiyaraaja
"Shakthi Ulla Thaye"	S. P. Balasubrahmanyam, Venkat Prabhu	Gangai Amaran

== Critical reception ==
R. P. R. of Kalki felt the film's screenplay gets weakened due to unbelievable emotional scenes and added Karthik Raja's songs were average but praised his background score and also praised Rajkiran's performance. K. N. Vijiyan of New Straits Times appreciated Ravishankar's cinematography and added, "Those who liked Rajkiran's previous movies will like Manikam".
