= Magaadu (1990 film) =

- Theatrical release poster
- Directed by: K. Madhu
- Written by: S. N. Swamy
- Produced by: Babu Ganesh
- Starring: Rajasekhar; Jeevitha; Lissy; Murali Mohan
- Music by: Raj–Koti
- Release date: 9 August 1990
- Country: India
- Language: Telugu

Magaadu (transl. Man) is a 1990 Indian Telugu-language spy film directed by K. Madhu. The film stars Rajasekhar, Jeevitha, Lissy and Murali Mohan. The film is a remake of the 1988 Malayalam film Moonnam Mura. Rajasekhar won the Filmfare Award for Best Actor – Telugu. It was dubbed and released in Tamil as Meesaikaran which was also a success. It marked Jeevitha Rajasekhar's last acting performance prior to her retirement.

== Cast ==
- Rajasekhar as Vikram
- Jeevitha as Vikram's wife
- Lissy as Swetha
- Murali Mohan as Police Inspector
- Thiagarajan
- R. Sarathkumar as SP Raju
- Devadas Kanakala as Police Inspector
- Babu Antony as Rowdy
- Prathapachandran
- Babu Mohan as Bus Passenger
- Hema Sundar
- Brahmaji as Ramana Babu
- P. J. Sharma
- Balaji
- Ramana Reddy
- K. K. Sharma
- Ali as Bus Conductor
- Baby Shamili as Vikram's daughter
- Rajesh as Bhargav
- J. V. Somayajulu
- P. R. Varalakshmi

== Reception ==
Griddaluru Gopalrao of Zamin Ryot on 31 August 1990 gave a favourable review for the film, appreciating the novel storyline, tight screenplay and Rajasekhar's performance.

== Awards ==
- Nandi Award for Best Editor - Krishnan
- Filmfare Award for Best Telugu Actor - Rajasekhar
