= Nee Sukhame Ne Koruthunna =

- Directed by: Giri Babu
- Written by: Gowri Shankar (dialogues)
- Screenplay by: Giri Babu
- Story by: Giri Babu
- Produced by: Giri Babu; Chappidi Hanumantha Rao
- Starring: Raja; Sneha
- Cinematography: Suresh
- Music by: Madhavapeddi Suresh
- Production company: Ranabheri Productions
- Release date: 22 February 2008
- Country: India
- Language: Telugu

Nee Sukhame Ne Koruthunna is a 2008 Indian Telugu-language romantic drama film directed by actor Giri Babu. The film stars Raja, Sneha in the lead roles. It was released on 22 February 2008. The film's title is based on the song of the same name from Murali Krishna (1964).

== Plot ==
Madhu hails from a poor family, but is a sports champion of the college. Besides, he is very good at studies. Swapna is the daughter of a millionaire Sarvabhouma Rao. She is also good at studies and other extra-curricular activities. However, she is a down-to-earth girl and always wants to be very simple. She goes to the college in bus and doesn't want to use even a car. Sekhar is their classmate. Sekhar loses his heart to Swapna. Ramya is also their classmate and is the best friend of Swapna. Once, Madhu saves a girl called Shanti when Swapna's brother teases her. So, he bears a grudge against Madhu. Though Sekhar loves Swapna, she gives her heart to Madhu and Sekhar silently moves away from them. When Madhu goes to Swapna's birthday party, he gets thrashed by her brother. So, Madhu decides to keep off away her for some time and goes to Hyderabad as he gets a job there. He promises Swapna that he would marry her by convincing her parents and brother after some time. Ramya, who also stays in Hyderabad after her marriage, mistakes Madhu, as he moves closely with Shanti, the daughter of the house owner. Moreover, one of Shanti's colleagues, who loves her, resorts to malicious campaign against Madhu and Shanti. This strengthens the doubts of Ramya and unfortunately Swapna goes to Hyderabad and she too mistakes the friendship of Madhu and Shanti. Swapna agrees to marry anybody as she feels that she has been ditched by Madhu. Incidentally, Sekhar happens to be the son of Sarvabhouma's childhood friend and they fix their marriage. However, Sekhar too tries to convince Swapna that Madhu is a gentleman but fails in his effort. When Madhu meets Swapna, she chides him and labels him a cheat. Just before the marriage, Sekhar dies in an accident. At this juncture, Shanti, who is the niece of Sekhar's father, visits him to console and she happens to see Swapna. She reveals the truth that her love is one-sided and Madhu really loves her and she is still in his thoughts. Swapna realises her mistake and finally the story ends with a happy note with the union of Swapna and Madhu.

== Cast ==
- Raja as Madhu
- Sneha as Swapna
- Kota Srinivasa Rao as Sarvabhouma Rao
- Chakravarthy as Sekhar
- Brahmanandam as Madhu's friend and his brother (dual roles)
- Kovai Sarala
- Ali
- Kondavalasa Lakshmana Rao
- Raghu Babu as Swapna's brother
- M. S. Narayana
- Narra Venkateswara Rao
- Uttej
- Ranganath
- L. B. Sriram
- Annapurna as Swapna's mother
- Jayalalita
- Giri Babu as College cricket commentator
- Allari Subhashini
- Navabharat Balaji
- Hemasri
- Sakhi
- Apoorva

== Production ==
Giri Babu announced that he was directing a film after a hiatus, and wrote the film thinking that Raja would suit the character. The muhurat shot took place on 16 August 2007.

== Soundtrack ==
The music and background score was composed by Madhavapeddi Suresh to lyrics written by Vennalakanti.

Track listing
No.	Title	Singer(s)	Length
1.	"Chandamamaravo"	Sunitha	3:55
2.	"Kannula Vindhuga"	Karthik, Sadhana Sargam	4:57
3.	"Monalisa Hihilessa"	Tippu	4:30
4.	"Oh Naa Prema"	S. P. Balasubrahmanyam	4:16
5.	"Ammaiye Putindama"	S. Janaki, S. P. Balasubrahmanyam	4:38
6.	"Yemito Idhi"	K. S. Chithra, Karthik	4:05
Total length:			26:21

== Reception ==
Y. Sunitha Chowdhary of The Hindu gave the film a negative review and opined that "The film has nothing to offer and even if it had, it takes a long time to move ahead".
