= Chinna (2001 film) =

Indian Telugu-language action drama film

- Directed by: Dasari Narayana Rao
- Written by: Dasari Narayana Rao
- Starring: Dasari Arun Kumar; Shilpa Shinde; Dasari Narayana Rao
- Cinematography: Gadiraju Srinivasa Rao
- Edited by: B. Krishnamraju
- Music by: S. A. Rajkumar
- Production company: Tharaka Prabhu Films
- Release date: 25 May 2001
- Country: India
- Language: Telugu

Chinna is a 2001 Indian Telugu-language action drama film directed by Dasari Narayana Rao starring Dasari Arun Kumar, Shilpa Shinde (credited as Akanksha) and himself.

== Plot ==
Chinna is a jobless graduate, who works inside his van selling food and drinks alongside his friends. He is influenced by his bus driver father Ramachandra and often takes the law into his own hands. Mini visits his shop and an argument ensues, which results in her spilling the Pepsi on his face. Mini's friends throw away a large quantity of the food of Chinna's shop's, which results in him summoning Mini to court. Chinna and Mini eventually fall in love, but little does he know that Mini, belongs to a politician family headed by her father Appa Rao.

Chinna's van is set on fire by Appa Rao's men and Chinna and his friends go to Appa Rao's residence to protest. The collector orders Appa Rao's son to go to jail but is eventually released with the police inspector twisting the case that the van exploded due to electric shock. His other son sets Ramachandra's bus on fire. As the press media is present, Appa Rao orders his son that set fire to the bus to go to jail. Appa Rao uses his influence in court to make the judge say that Ramachandra is mentally ill. A deeply saddened Ramachandra eventually dies.

Chinna eventually becomes a police officer. He takes the law in his own hands and fights back Appa Rao's men in revenge for his father's death and justice for the nation.

== Cast ==
- Dasari Arun Kumar as Chinna
- Shilpa Shinde as Mini
- Dasari Narayana Rao as Ramachandra, Chinna's father
- Vennira Aadai Nirmala as Chinna's mother
- Sangeeta as Mini's mother
- K. Viswanath as Governor
- Kantha Rao as Judge
- Raza Murad as Public Prosecutor
- Murali Mohan as a police inspector
- Narra Venkateswara Rao as Lawyer
- Sivakrishna as a police inspector
- Kota Srinivasa Rao as Appa Rao
- Brahmanandam as the army soldier
- AVS as the army soldier's photographer
- Sudhakar
- L. B. Sriram
- Ali as Chinna's friend
- Uttej as Chinna's friend
- Venu Madhav as Chinna's friend
- Tirupathi Prakash as Chinna's friend
- Kazan Khan as Appa Rao's son
- G. V. Sudhakar Naidu as Appa Rao's son
- Jeeva as Police Inspector
- Madhusudhan Rao as a henchman (uncredited)
- Besant Ravi as an army officer in Appa Rao's camp (uncredited)
- Kotesh Manava as a government employee (uncredited)

== Production ==
This film marked the debut of Shilpa Shinde. After the failure of Greeku Veerudu (1998), Dasari Narayana Rao decided to focus on this film fully and postponed the shooting of Kondaveeti Simhasanam (2002). This film also marked the first time that Dasari Narayana Rao shot abroad for his films with two of songs being canned in New Zealand. As of January 2001, the film was in post-production.

== Soundtrack ==
The music was composed by S. A. Rajkumar.

- "Abba Hairabba" - P. Unnikrishnan, Swarnalatha
- "Chiranjeevi Inti Kada" - S. P. Balasubrahmanyam, Sujatha Mohan
- "Guvva Guvva" - Dr. Narayana
- "Ne Raasaanu" - Rajesh, Sujatha
- "Oka Chitramana Sanghtana" - P. Unnikrishnan, Sujatha

== Release ==
The film was scheduled to release in December 2000 but kept getting delayed.
