= Dasari Arun Kumar =

Indian actor

- Other name: Arun Kumar Dasari
- Occupations: Actor, politician
- Years active: 1998–present
- Parent: Dasari Narayana Rao (father)

Dasari Arun Kumar is an Indian former actor and politician, who worked in Telugu-language films. He often collaborated with his father Dasari Narayana Rao.

== Career ==
In 1998, he made his debut with Dasari Narayana Rao's Greeku Veerudu co-starring Pooja Batra and further made a special appearance in Anthahpuram that same year. In 2000, Arun Kumar worked on Kondaveeti Simhasanam and Orey Thammudu co-starring Srihari but was later removed from the first film as it went through production delays. His next film Chinna (2001) garnered notice for shooting its songs in New Zealand and for its attempt to dub the film in Sinhala and release it in Sri Lanka. His next film Rifles (2002) was set in Telangana and featured Vijaya Shanthi.

He co-starred P. Sai Kumar, Thriller Manju and Vani Viswanath in the action film Janam later that same year. He played Nandamuri Harikrishna's brother in Tiger Harischandra Prasad (2003) and a critic called his performance "adequate". He returned to playing the lead role with Adivishnu co-starring Sneha.

== Personal life ==
In 2019, Arun Kumar joined the YSR Congress Party.

In 2021, a case was filed against him under the SC/ST Atrocities Act after a complaint by a former employee. In 2022, he was arrested for drunk driving and later released on bail.

== Filmography ==
List of film acting credits
Year	Title	Role	Notes
1998	Greeku Veerudu	Rajesh	
1998	Anthahpuram		Special appearance
1999	Pellivaramandi	Chanti	
2001	Orey Thammudu		
2001	Chinna	Chinna	
2002	Rifles		
2002	Janam	Vishal	
2002	Siva Rama Raju		Special appearance in the song "Nirupedala Devudivaiah"
2003	Tiger Harischandra Prasad	Devaprasad	
2004	Pelli Kosam		
2006	Samanyudu	Abhi	
2008	Adivishnu	Vishnu	
2017	Okka Kshanam	Dr. T. S. Tarun	
2018	Shailaja Reddy Alludu	Anu's uncle	
2019	Venky Mama	Dora Babu	
