= Anjala Zaveri =

Indian actress

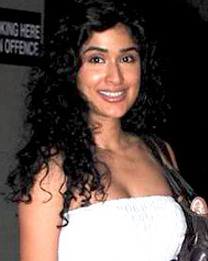
- Zaveri in 2010
- Born: 20 April 1972 (age 54); Portsmouth, Hampshire, England
- Years active: 1997 – 2012
- Spouse: Tarun Arora

Anjala Zaveri (born 20 April 1972) is a British Indian actress known for her work in Telugu and Hindi cinema. She appeared in several successful films, including the Telugu films Preminchukundam Raa (1997), Choodalani Vundi (1998), and Samarasimha Reddy (1999), as well as the Hindi film Pyaar Kiya To Darna Kya (1998).

== Personal life ==
Zaveri was born on 20 April 1972 in a Gujarati family in Portsmouth, Hampshire. She is married to Tarun Arora.

== Career ==
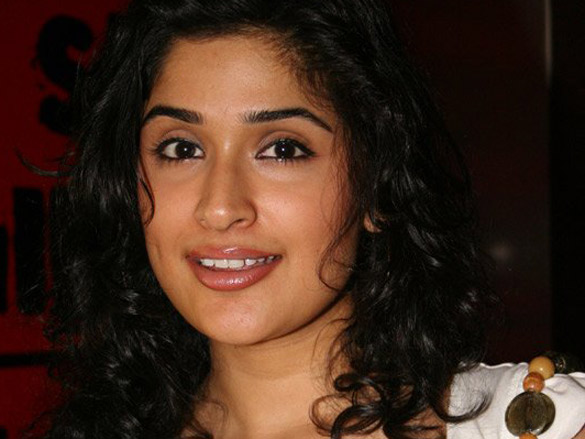
Zaveri in 2007

Anjala Zaveri was discovered by actor Vinod Khanna through a nationwide talent search in England. She made her film debut with Himalay Putra (1997), which also marked the debut of Akshaye Khanna, but the film failed to make an impact. She later appeared in Betaabi (1997). Her only commercially successful Hindi film was the romantic comedy Pyaar Kiya To Darna Kya (1998), where she starred alongside Salman Khan, Arbaaz Khan, and Kajol.

Zaveri found greater success in Telugu cinema. She made her Telugu debut in Preminchukundam Raa (1997) opposite Venkatesh, which became a blockbuster. She later starred alongside Chiranjeevi in Choodalani Vundi (1998), one of the highest-grossing Telugu films of the time. In 1999, she appeared in Samarasimha Reddy opposite Nandamuri Balakrishna, which became the highest-grossing Telugu film at the time. Her later Telugu films, such as Devi Putrudu (2001) and Bhalevadivi Basu (2001), failed at the box office. She then appeared in Aaptudu (2004), which had a moderate run. After a hiatus, she returned to acting with a role in Life Is Beautiful (2012).

In addition to Telugu and Hindi films, Zaveri also acted in Tamil, Malayalam, and Kannada films, working with actors like Mammootty and Sudeep.

== Filmography ==
| Year | Film | Role | Language | Notes |
|---|---|---|---|---|
| 1997 | Himalay Putra | Esha | Hindi | |
| 1997 | Preminchukundam Raa | Kaveri | Telugu | Nominated-Filmfare Award for Best Actress – Telugu |
| 1997 | Pagaivan | Uma | Tamil | |
| 1997 | Betaabi | Sheena Ajmera | Hindi | |
| 1998 | Pyaar Kiya To Darna Kya | Ujala | Hindi | |
| 1998 | Choodalani Vundi | Priya | Telugu | |
| 1999 | Samarasimha Reddy | Anjali | Telugu | |
| 1999 | Ravoyi Chandamama | Meghana | Telugu | |
| 2001 | Ullam Kollai Poguthae | Jyothi | Tamil | |
| 2001 | Devi Putrudu | Satyavati | Telugu | |
| 2001 | Bhalevadivi Basu | Nemali | Telugu | |
| 2001 | Dubai | Ammu Swaminathan | Malayalam | |
| 2001 | Prema Sandadi | Sita | Telugu | |
| 2002 | Soch | | Hindi | Guest appearance |
| 2004 | Muskaan | Shikha | Hindi | |
| 2004 | Bazaar | | Hindi | |
| 2004 | Naani | | Telugu | Guest appearance |
| 2004 | Shankar Dada MBBS | | Telugu | Guest appearance |
| 2004 | Aaptudu | Manju | Telugu | |
| 2005 | Nigehbaan | | Hindi | Guest appearance |
| 2005 | Nammanna | Anjali | Kannada | |
| 2010 | Inidhu Inidhu | Shreya | Tamil | Guest appearance |
| 2012 | Life Is Beautiful | Maya | Telugu | |
