= Sevakudu =

2013 film

- Directed by: V. Samudra
- Story by: Swamiji–Vijay
- Produced by: Muttineni Satyanarayana
- Starring: Srikanth; Charmy Kaur; Krishna
- Cinematography: M. Sudhakar
- Edited by: Nandamuri Hari
- Music by: Srikanth Deva
- Production company: Sri Venkata Ramana Art Productions
- Release date: 4 January 2013
- Running time: 154 minutes
- Country: India
- Language: Telugu

Sevakudu (transl. Volunteer) is a 2013 Indian Telugu-language vigilante film directed by V. Samudra and starring Srikanth, Charmy Kaur, and Krishna. The film was dubbed in Tamil as Ini Oru Vidhi Seivom and released in 2014.

== Cast ==
- Krishna as Krishna Prasad
- Srikanth as Surya
- Charmy Kaur
- Manjula Ghattamaneni as Manjula
- Brahmanandam as Brahmi
- Nassar as Ramachandrayya
- Pradeep Rawat as Balram Jadoo
- Vijayachander
- Srinivasa Reddy as Raju, Surya's friend
- Sivaji Raja
- Tirupathi Prakash
- Chitti Babu
- Sattanna
- Dasanna
- M. S. Narayana as Narayana
- Ahuti Prasad
- Chalapathi Rao
- Sangeetha
- Hema
- Jenny

== Production ==
The film began production in 2010 with Srikanth and Vimala Raman in the lead roles; however, Raman was later replaced by Charmy Kaur. The film released in 2013 due to much delay. Manjula Ghattamaneni and Krishna were signed to portray guest roles.

== Soundtrack ==
Music by Srikanth Deva. The song "Abbayi Andhra Mirchi" is partially based on "Sheila Ki Jawani". The song "Magadheerullona" is based on "Madurai Jilla Machan" from Thiruvilayadal Aarambam. The song "Guddu Guddu" is based on "Otha Viral Kaatina" from Kuthu.

- "Adugadugo Sevakudu" - Mano
- "Magadheerullona Maharjathakudammo" - Karthik, Anuradha Sriram
- "Guddu Guddu" - S. P. Balasubrahmanyam
- "Aa Devudu Puttinchadu" - Harish Raghavendra, Chinmayi
- "Abbayi Andhra Mirchi" - Ranjith, Sravya

== Release and reception ==
The film was scheduled to be released in February 2012, but was delayed to January 2013. The Times of India gave the film a rating of one-and-a-half out of five stars and noted that " It's another vigilante movie that's very low on IQ and high on misplaced jingoism". News18 wrote that "Call it a passe or simply lazy filmmaking, but all that the Telugu film 'Sevakudu manages at the end is present you with a rehash of several Telugu films released over the year".
