= Diwan (film) =

2003 Indian film

- Theatrical release poster
- Directed by: Surya Prakash
- Written by: Surya Prakash
- Produced by: P. L. Thenappan
- Starring: R. Sarathkumar; Kiran Rathod; Vadivelu; Sharmili
- Cinematography: Vijay K. Chakravarthy
- Edited by: K. Thanigachalam
- Music by: S. A. Rajkumar
- Production company: Shree Raajalakshmi Films
- Release date: 23 August 2003
- Country: India
- Language: Tamil

Diwan (/ðɪwɑːn/) is a 2003 Indian Tamil-language action drama film starring R. Sarathkumar in dual roles, Kiran Rathod, Vadivelu and Sharmilee. It was directed by Surya Prakash and produced by P. L. Thenappan. The film was released on 23 August 2003.

== Plot ==
Raghavan and Velu work as cooks in a non-vegetarian hotel. Raghavan falls in love with Geetha, the daughter of a rich man, but her father is against this love and insults him as a poor man. Raghavan challenges him that he will be rich in a year. There is a subplot in the story, for Aishwarya, a daughter from a rich family; she is the apple of the eye of the family. Aishwarya ran home with her lover Raju, who worked as a driver to her house. He tells that his friend Dinesh will help them. However, Raju escaped because he had a bad dream where he is killed by her family as if it will happen in reality. Due to that, he vanishes. Raghavan understands her plight and helps her. Raghavan fights Dinesh and his men and escapes to Rajapalayam along with Meenakshi.

Suddenly, he comes to a village in Tirunelveli where the villagers call him "Duraisingam". Raghavan does not know who Duraisingam is. A woman tells Raghavan that he is the grandson of Duraisingam. The film goes into a flashback, where Duraisingam is depicted as a do-gooder who helps poor people. He has a clash with a big gangster Kandhavel, who wants be the next minister. Duraisingam could not kill him because he promised his wife that she will never become a widow. When the election results comes, Kandhavel loses. Enraged, Kandhavel orders his men to kill Duraisingam and his family. In the clash, Duraisingam's sons are killed and the baby of Duraisingam's older son is lost. The baby happens to be Raghavan. Duraisingam surrenders to the police, after killing Kandhavel's brothers and chopping Kandhavel's right hand.

After the flashback, Raghavan visits the jail only to know that Duraisingam had died a few years back. Kandhavel becomes furious after getting to know that his son Dinesh succumbed to the injuries caused by Raghavan during the fight to safeguard Aishwarya. Kandhavel sends his henchmen to kill Raghavan and Meenakshi. During a car chase, the car in which Raghavan and Aishwarya were in tumbles down near a riverbed. Miraculously, Raghavan and Aishwarya escape from this accident and reach the defunct mill of Aishwarya's family. Aishwarya's father and relatives, while attempting to kill each other, receive a call from Raghavan. Raghavan acts like a kidnapper and demands ransom from Aishwarya's family. Eventually, Meenakshi's father and the relatives find Raghavan and Aishwarya in their mill and beats Raghavan but apologise to him after knowing the truth from Aishwarya. Kandhavel along with his men reach the mill and engages in a fight with Aishwarya's family. Raghavan fights them all but leaves Kandhavel, due to the promise that Duraisingam gave to his wife. Aishwarya marries the groom selected by her parents, and Raghavan unites with Geetha.

== Cast ==
- R. Sarathkumar as Raghavan and Duraisingam
- Kiran Rathod as Geetha
- Vadivelu in a dual role as Velu and his father
- Sharmilee as Aishwarya
- Manorama as Duraisingam's sister
- Sriman as Saravana Paandian
- Jaya Prakash Reddy as Kandhavel
- Vijayan as Geetha's father
- Anandaraj as Aishwarya's father
- Uday Prakash as Chandran
- Muthukaalai as Marudha Muthukaalai
- Ponnambalam as Kandhavel's second brother
- Besant Ravi as Kandhavel's younger brother
- Madhan Bob as Chinnasami
- Bhupinder Singh
- Scissor Manohar
- Crane Manohar
- Manobala
- Ajay Rathnam as Gnanasekaran
- Thennavan
- Ravi Raghavendra as Gunasekaran
- Thalapathy Dinesh
- Halwa Vasu
- Idichapuli Selvaraj
- Balu Anand
- Suryakanth
- Kuyili as Baakiyam
- Nithya Ravindran

== Production ==
Sarathkumar plays dual roles, as an old man and his grandson. Diwan is the seventh film to feature him in dual roles. Filming began in Chennai and also took place in neighbouring areas. As the grandson, Sarathkumar performed a stunt scene sans a double. The scene required him to climb a high-rise building and he used a rope to hang from the roof. A romantic scene and a song involving Sarathkumar and Kiran Rathod were shot at the Edward Elliot's Beach. A few songs were shot at New Zealand. The look of the older Sarathkumar was inspired by the Scottish actor Sean Connery.

== Soundtrack ==
Soundtrack was composed by S. A. Rajkumar.

Song	Singer(s)	Lyrics
"Ayyayyo"	Tippu, Sujatha	Pa. Vijay
"Gundu Pakkara"	Shankar Mahadevan	Pa. Vijay
"Konjam Konjama"	Karthik, Anuradha Sriram	Pa. Vijay
"Oru Thaalaattu"	Harish Raghavendra	Na. Muthukumar
"Paarthathile"	S. A. Rajkumar, Sathya	S. A. Rajkumar

== Release and reception ==
Diwan was initially scheduled to release on 15 August 2003, but was pushed to the following week, 23 August. Mokkarasu of Kalki praised the flashback, Vadivelu's humour, stunts and choreography but panned Rathod, violence and antagonist and concluded saying they have tried a Baashha for Sarathkumar but it did not work out. Malini Mannath of Chennai Online said "Diwaan' is all sound and no fury!". Sify wrote, "You certainly need a brave heart to sit through this travesty that is tough on the nerves, with a hoary and hackneyed plot".
