= Suryam =

2004 Indian film by V. Samudra

- Directed by: V. Samudra
- Written by: Dialogues: Paruchuri Brothers; Ghatikachalam
- Screenplay by: Samudra
- Story by: Seetaram
- Produced by: Mohan Babu
- Starring: Manchu Vishnu; Celina Jaitly; Veda
- Cinematography: V. Jayaram
- Edited by: Gautham Raju
- Music by: Chakri
- Production company: Sree Lakshmi Prasanna Pictures
- Release date: 2 December 2004
- Running time: 145 minutes
- Country: India
- Language: Telugu

Suryam is a 2004 Indian Telugu-language action drama film directed by Samudra and starring Manchu Vishnu, Celina Jaitly, and Veda. The film was produced by Vishnu's father Mohan Babu under his banner Sri Lakshmi Prasanna Pictures. Mohan Babu had previously produced Vishnu's first film, Vishnu (2003).

== Cast ==
- Manchu Vishnu as Suryam
- Celina Jaitly as Madhulatha
- Veda as Swati
- Srinath as Amar
- Mukesh Rishi as Madhulatha's father
- Jhansi as Suryam's mother
- Sunil as Gaali Seenu
- Kota Srinivasa Rao as Police Officer
- Giri Babu
- Vinaya Prasad
- Brahmanandam as Pujari (Priest)
- Babu Mohan
- Ali
- Ananth
- Venu Madhav
- Raghu Babu
- Subbaraju as Badhram
- Kondavalasa
- Rajesh
- Alapati Lakshmi
- Ponnambalam
- Padma Jayanthi
- Besant Ravi
- Mohan Babu in a special appearance

== Soundtrack ==
The music was composed by Chakri. The audio function was held in Taj Krishna on 14 November 2004. Dasari Narayana Rao attended the function as the chief guest.

No.	Title	Singer(s)	Length
1.	"Ososi Nanganasi"	Chakri, Kousalya	4:19
2.	"Endakalamlo"	Shankar Mahadevan, Sujatha Mohan	4:27
3.	"Neeli Kannula"	Shreya Ghoshal, Udit Narayan	4:41
4.	"Nakai Puttinadana"	KK, Shreya Ghoshal	5:29
5.	"Anandam Anandam"	K. J. Yesudas	4:15
6.	"Akumuttadi Sokumuttadi"	Tippu, Kousalya

== Reception ==
Idlebrain gave the film a rating of two-and-three-quarters out of four and wrote that "The director gave more preference to put as many slots as possible for stunts in the film instead of concentrating on narrating the story".
