= V. Samudra =

Indian film director

Vankadari Samudra Rao, also known as V. Samudra, is a Telugu film director. He started his career as a director with the film Simharasi in 2001, which turned out to be a hit. He directed more than 15 movies.

== Filmography ==
- Note: all films are in Telugu, unless otherwise noted.

Year	Title	Notes
2001	Simharasi	Remake of Maayi
2001	Darling Darling	Remake of Darling Darling
2002	Siva Rama Raju	Remake of Samudhiram and Simmarasi
2003	Tiger Harischandra Prasad	
2004	Suryam	
2005	Mahanandi	
2007	Vijayadasami	Remake of Sivakasi
2007	Evadaithe Nakenti	Remake of Lion
2008	Mallepuvvu	Also actor
2009	Adhineta	
2009	Venkatadri	
2010	Panchakshari	
2013	Sevakudu	
2013	Chandee	
2021	Jai Sena	
2021	Ranam	Kannada film

As actor

- Rainbow (2008)
