= Manasunna Maaraju =

- Directed by: Muthyala Subbaiah
- Based on: Kottaram Veettile Apputtan by C. V. Balakrishnan
- Produced by: D. V. V. Danayya; J. Bhagavan
- Starring: Rajasekhar; Laya
- Cinematography: S. Sudhakar Reddy
- Music by: Vandemataram Srinivas
- Production company: Sri Balaji Art Creations
- Release date: 11 August 2000
- Country: India
- Language: Telugu

Manasunna Maaraju is a 2000 Indian Telugu-language drama film directed by Muthyala Subbaiah. The film stars Dr. Rajasekhar and Laya in the lead roles. It was a remake of the Malayalam film Kottaram Veettile Apputtan (1998).

== Cast ==
- Rajasekhar as Dorababu
- Laya as Amrutha
- Kota Srinivasa Rao
- Brahmanandam
- Manorama as Peramma
- Babloo Prithviraj as Pradeep
- Annapoorna as Seethakka
- Tanikella Bharani as Nagaraju
- Raja Ravindra as MLA Chowdary's son
- Rajitha
- L. B. Sriram
- Asha Saini
- Venu Madhav
- Sudhakar
- Tirupathi Prakash
- Bandla Ganesh
- Kallu Chidambaram

== Soundtrack ==
The soundtrack was composed by Vandemataram Srinivas. The track "Nenu Gaali" also features as a background song in the 2024 Telugu film Mathu Vadalara 2.

- 1) "Nenu Gaali" - Udit Narayan, Anuradha Paudwal, Tippu (Humming)
- 2) "O Prema"(Version l) - Sonu Nigam
- 3) "O Prema"(Version ll) - Rajesh Krishnan
- 4) "Allari Priyuda" - Shankar Mahadevan, Swarnalatha
- 5) "Maaghamasam" - K. S. Chithra, Udit Narayan
- 6) "Eddulabandi Ekki" - Sukhwinder Singh, Nithyasree Mahadevan
- 7) "Oodala Oodala Marri Chettu" - Mano, Sujatha Mohan, Malgudi Subha, Tippu

== Reception ==
Andhra Today wrote "One wonders at the choice of the story by the director and his conviction in it specially when it defies logic. Added to this fare is the insipid comedy to bore. A delayed declaration of love by Amrutha for Dorababu comes as no revelation as the director makes it out to be. That's what makes the movie a drag". Indiainfo wrote "In spite of the routine storyline, its narration makes the film watchable. For Rajashekar, the role is a cakewalk as he has enacted the same many times times before. Laya does her part well while the other girl Asha Saini has been confined to a song. But the person who really steals the thunder is L B Sriram in a pellilla perayya role. Vandemataram Srinivas has given decent music and there are at least two very hummable numbers".
