= Ravinuthala =

- Village
- Interactive map of Ravinuthala
- Coordinates: 15°44′20″N 80°04′55″E
- Country: India
- State: Andhra Pradesh
- District: Prakasam
- Mandal: Korisapadu

Area
  - Total: 2,562 ha (6,330 acres)

Population
  - Total: 8,279
- Time zone: Indian Standard Time
- PIN: 523213

Ravinuthala is an agricultural village in Prakasam district, located within the state of Andhra Pradesh, India.

== Demographics ==
According to the 2011 Indian Census, the village possesses approximately two thousand houses, with more than 8,279 people (4,034 male and 4,245 female). It is the predominant Panchayat in Korisapadu, which is the mandal it belongs to. In 2011, the overall literacy rate of Ravinuthala was 64.91%, compared to Andhra Pradesh's 67.02%.

== Education ==
The Raghupati Venkata Ratnam Naidu Zilla Parishat Unnata Paatasaala was opened before national independence. The land was donated by the local Kapu for the benefit of the village. The village's high school is the primary reason behind the upward movement of the village.

== Places of interest ==
It possesses a cricket stadium wherein state-level matches are held, often viewed by popular celebrities. It is also known for its numerous temples

Sri Chennakesava Swamy Temple: This temple was constructed by the Chola emperors in the 14th century. This temple has been given 42 acres (0.17 km^{2}) of land for daily offerings and incense.

Sri Malliswara Swamy Temple: It is known from the inscriptions here that the minister of Kakatiya Prataparudra established the Malleswara Swamy temple here in the year 1215. It is still a tradition to take the ceremonial idols of Sri Chennakesava Swamy and Sri Durganaga Malleswara Swamy in a procession, during the village festival on Mukkoti Ekadashi, as well as Vijayadashami.

== Notable people ==
• Giri Babu - Indian Telugu-language film actor, producer and director

• Nagabhairava Koteswara Rao - prominent poet, literary figure, and film lyricist

• Raghu Babu - Indian Telugu-language film actor and comedian
