= Surya Chandra =

1985 Telugu film by Vijaya Nirmala

- Directed by: Vijaya Nirmala
- Written by: Satyanand (Dialogues)
- Screenplay by: Vijaya Nirmala
- Based on: Surya Chandra by Chittareddy Suryakumari
- Produced by: S. Ramanand
- Starring: Krishna Ghattamaneni; Jaya Prada; Prabha; Deepa
- Cinematography: Pushpala Gopikrishna
- Edited by: Adurthi Haranath
- Music by: Ramesh Naidu
- Production company: Sri Vijaya Krishna Movies
- Release date: 11 October 1985
- Country: India
- Language: Telugu

Surya Chandra is a 1985 Indian Telugu-language action drama film written and directed by Vijaya Nirmala, based on the novel of the same name by Chittareddy Suryakumari. The film stars Krishna, Jayaprada, Prabha, Deepa, and Kaikala Satyanarayana in prominent roles. The music for the film was composed by Ramesh Naidu. Surya Chandra was a commercial success.

== Cast ==
- Krishna as Surya Chandra
- Jayaprada as Pooja
- J.V. Somayajulu as Ramachandra Rao
- Prabha as Lakshmi
- Deepa as Deepthi
- Kaikala Satyanarayana as Narayana Rao
- Anjali Devi
- Mano Chitra
- Mucherla Aruna as Rekha
- Giri Babu as Bhasker Rao
- Y.G. Mahendran (voiced by Rallapalli) as Kabir
- Suthi Velu as Maruthi Rao
- P. L. Narayana as Papa Rao
- Rajanala as Surya Chandra's prospective father-in-law
- Subha as Nandana
- Radha Kumari
- Kalpana Rai
- Suryakantham
- Banerjee
- Usilai Mani
- Modukuri Sathyam
- Baby Meena as Keerthi

== Music ==
Surya Chandra

Soundtrack album by Ramesh Naidu
- Released: 1985
- Recorded: 1985
- Genre: Feature film soundtrack

Ramesh Naidu chronology
Sangeetha Samrat (1984)	Surya Chandra (1985)	Mogudu Pellalu (1985)

The music was composed by Ramesh Naidu. Veturi Sundrarama Murthy penned the lyrics.

At the time, a controversy arose between Krishna and singer S. P. Balasubrahmanyam. Impressed by the voice of Raj Sitaram, a degree student from Tamil Nadu, Krishna chose him to sing all the songs for Surya Chandra.

Sl.No.	Title	Singer(s)
1.	"Abbabba Soku"	P. Susheela, Raj Seetharam
2.	"Ee Jeevana Venuvu"	P. Susheela, Raj Seetharam
3.	"Enthati Allarivadamma"	P. Susheela, Raj Seetharam
4.	"Godari Cheerkatte"	P. Susheela, Raj Seetharam
5.	"Nede Manaki Holiday"	P. Susheela
6.	"Sriranga Dhamuda"	P. Susheela, Raj Seetharam
