= Aaptudu =

- DVD Cover
- Directed by: Muthyala Subbaiah
- Written by: Posani Krishna Murali (dialogues)
- Screenplay by: Muthyala Subbaiah
- Story by: Rajkumar Santoshi
- Based on: Ghatak (1996) by Rajkumar Santoshi
- Produced by: Jeevitha Rajasekhar
- Starring: Rajasekhar; Anjala Zhaveri
- Cinematography: S Ka Bhupati
- Music by: Ramana Gogula
- Production company: Andal Arts
- Release date: 22 October 2004
- Country: India
- Language: Telugu

Aaptudu (transl. Bosom friend) is a 2004 Indian Telugu-language action film directed by Muthyala Subbaiah starring Rajasekhar and Anjala Zhaveri. The film is a remake of Ghatak (1996).

== Cast ==
- Rajasekhar as Bose
- Anjala Zhaveri
- Mukesh Rishi as Gangi Reddy
- Chandra Mohan as Chandram
- Kaikala Satyanarayana as Sivaramakrishnayya
- Brahmanandam as Lakshma Reddy
- Sunil as Venkat
- Chalapathi Rao as a resident
- Krishna Bhagavan as a resident
- Rallapalli as a resident
- Kondavalasa
- Sana
- Omkar
- Abhinayashree
- Anant
- A. V. S.
- Narsing Yadav as Narsing
- Raghu Babu as Raghu
- Gautham Raju as Hospital receptionist
- Chitti Babu
- Suman (guest appearance)
- Eeswari Rao (guest appearance)

== Production ==
This film marks the return of Anjala Zaveri to Telugu films following a brief hiatus. Rajasekhar produced the film. The film was shot in April 2004. Mukesh Rishi was cast in a negative role. Suman and Eeswari Rao were cast in guest roles. A colony set was built at Ramanaidu Cine Village.

== Soundtrack ==
The songs were composed by Ramana Gogula. The Hindu gave a mixed review for the songs. "Toofanai" based on Babooji Jara Dheere Chalo from Dum (2003). "Pedala Paina" is based on a song from Humraaz (1967).

| No. | Title | Singer(s) | Length |
|---|---|---|---|
| 1. | "Anadiga" | Sriram Parthasarathy, Nanditha |
| 2. | "Palle Palleku" | Shankar Mahadevan |
| 3. | "Pedala Paina" | Tippu, Nanditha |
| 4. | "Manasulo" | Udit Narayan, Ganga |
| 5. | "Thufanai" | Malathi |
| 6. | "Aakhari Narasimham" | S. P. Balasubrahmanyam |

== Release and reception ==
The film was released on 23 October 2004, coinciding with Vijayadashami.

A critic from The Hindu opined that "VETERAN DIRECTOR, Muthyala Subbaiah, turns out a reasonably good formula story". Jeevi of Idlebrain.com gave the film a rating of two-and-a-half out of five and said that "The plus point of the film is hero Raja Sekhar. Minus points is inept handling by Muthyala Subbayya for an action film". A critic from Full Hyderabad criticized the film as a whole.
