= Tiger Harischandra Prasad =

2003 Indian Telugu-language film

- DVD cover
- Directed by: V. Samudra
- Screenplay by: Paruchuri brothers Posani Krishna Murali
- Dialogue by: Paruchuri brothers
- Story by: Posani Krishna Murali
- Produced by: P. Naga Lakshmi
- Starring: Nandamuri Harikrishna; Ramya Krishna
- Edited by: Y. V. S. Chowdary
- Music by: S. A. Rajkumar
- Production company: Sri Lakshmi Narasimha Productions
- Release date: 18 December 2003
- Country: India
- Language: Telugu

Tiger Harischandra Prasad is a 2003 Indian Telugu-language action drama film directed by V. Samudra starring Nandamuri Harikrishna and Ramya Krishna. The film is based on the problems of peasants.

The film received pre-release hype, but it was released to mixed reviews. This film marked Posani Krishna Murali's sixth collaboration with Nandamuri Harikrishna and their only unsuccessful film.

== Cast ==
- Nandamuri Harikrishna as Tiger Harischandra Prasad
- Ramya Krishna as Rajeswari
- Dasari Arun Kumar as Devaprasad
- Sangeetha as Swathi
- Narra Venkateswara Rao as C. I.
- Ahuti Prasad
- Kota Srinivasa Rao as Rajeswari's uncle
- Jayaprakash Reddy
- G. V. Sudhakar Naidu as Papa Rao
- Anandaraj as Killer Koteswar Rao
- Brahmanandam as Bhoomika (in female getup)
- Kovai Sarala as Pawan Kalyan (in male getup)
- Hema
- Rajitha as Protestor
- Bandla Ganesh
- Anitha Chowdary
- Surekha Vani as Maa TV reporter
- Satya Prakash as Police Inspector
- Brahmaji
- Kondavalasa as Swamy
- Chalapathi Rao as Agriculture Minister
- Girish Karnad as Prime Minister
- Grandhi Subba Rao in a special appearance
- N. T. Rama Rao as Tiger Harischandra Prasad's father (in portrait)

== Production ==
The film was produced by P. Naga Lakshmi, who previously produced Aadi (2002). In October 2003, the film was shot in Chilakaluripet, Guntur (at Jinnah Tower) and Narasaraopet. As of 24 November 2003, the shooting of the film was complete except for two songs.

== Soundtrack ==
The soundtrack was composed by S. A. Rajkumar. Nachaki of Telugu Cinema wrote "The tunes are good, yes, but seem too common, and blame it partly on the beat used in the songs. The audience feels like they're listening to songs of a mid-80's movie, partly because of the theme of the movie!"

Track listing
No.	Title	Lyrics	Singer(s)	Length
1.	"Kadeddula"	Jaladi Raja Rao	S. P. Balasubrahmanyam, K. S. Chithra	6:58
2.	"Premalona Emi Maya"	E. S. Murthy	Karthik, Shreya Ghoshal	6:23
3.	"Cheppana"	Chirravuri Vijaykumar	Tippu, Swarnalatha	4:21
4.	"Simhamochina"	Chirravuri Vijaykumar	S. P. Balasubrahmanyam, Sujatha Mohan	4:56
5.	"Deshama"	Jaladi Raja Rao	S. P. Balasubrahmanyam	5:24
Total length:				28:02

== Reception ==
Gudipoodi Srihari of The Hindu wrote that "Harikrishna gets a tailor made role well cut out for his style of acting, with rugged appeal. But some frivolous scenes including the comedy featuring Brahmanandam and Kovai Sarala, puts the film on a sidetrack". Jeevi of Idlebrain.com rated the film three out of five and wrote that "The last 20 minutes of the film is impressive. The rest of the film is narrated in old fashion. This film would take Hari Krishna close to the masses". In a negative review, a critic from Full Hyderabad wrote that "This might've as well been a B-grade Narayana Murthy revolutionary pain, but one doesn't associate pains with Ramya Krishna around. But that's the pain: she's hardly around. This seems like an emerging trend in Tollywood. Not Ramya Krishna's absence, but movies with social messages". Telugu Cinema wrote "[..] the film fails to evoke any interest neither to the audience targeted nor to the common audience. The film basically looks like R.Narayanamurthy films but has a huge starcast to reach the audience."
