= Evadaithe Nakenti =

- Poster
- Directed by: V. Samudra; Jeevitha Rajasekhar
- Written by: Paruchuri brothers (dialogues)
- Screenplay by: Rajasekhar
- Story by: Udaykrishna–Sibi K. Thomas
- Based on: Lion (Malayalam)
- Starring: Rajasekhar; Samvrutha Sunil; Raghuvaran; Kalabhavan Mani; Mumaith Khan
- Edited by: Nandamuri Hari
- Music by: Chinna
- Release date: 9 February 2007
- Running time: 174 min.
- Country: India
- Language: Telugu

Evadaithe Nakenti (transl. I don't care, whoever it is) is a 2007 Indian Telugu film directed by V. Samudra and Jeevitha Rajasekhar. Rajasekhar plays the lead role. The film was released on 9 February 2007. This film has been dubbed in Tamil with the title Udambu Eppadi Irukku. The film is a remake of the Malayalam film Lion (2006). The climax scene was remade from the 2004 Tamil film Madurey, starring Vijay in the lead.

== Cast ==
- Rajasekhar as Major/Home Minister Surya
- Samvrutha Sunil as Priya
- Bhanuchander as Police Officer
- Subbaraju as Subbu, Surya's friend brother-in-law
- Raghuvaran as Education Minister Bal Gangadhar
- Kalabhavan Mani as Devulapalli Nataraja Kalidas "DNK" alias Donga Na Koduku
- Krishna Bhagavaan as PK Babu
- Mumaith Khan as Inspector Maisamma
- Paruchuri Venkateswara Rao as Head Constable
- Giri Babu as Chief Minister of Andhra Pradesh
- Devaraj as Chakravarthi
- Raghu Babu as Pidikila Pentayya Dora
- Babu Mohan as MLA
- Annapoorna as Surya's mother
- Jhansi as Meena B. Gangadhar
- Narsing Yadav as Narsing
- Kota Srinivasa Rao as Governor of Andhra Pradesh
- Prudhvi Raj as Electricity Minister Diwakar
- Chakri as Bullabbayi
- Ranganath
- Bharath Reddy as an eve-teaser
- Surya as Municipal Commissioner
- Gundu Sudarshan as Lawyer
- Tarzan as Tarzan
- Kadambari Kiran as Minister
- Kallu Chidambaram as Kallu Chidambaram
- Gundu Hanumantha Rao as Chief Minister's PA

== Music ==
Music was composed by Chinna. The song "Sainikude" is plagiarised from song "Varanda" from Tamil film Madurey.

No.	Title	Singer(s)	Length
1.	"Yevadaithe"	Naveen
2.	"Thappadura"	Suchitra
3.	"Mandana"	Sadhana Sargam, Udit Narayan
4.	"Yedho"	K. S. Chithra, Karthik
5.	"Sainukudu"	Mano
6.	"Evadaithe Nakenti Theme Music" (Instrumental)

== Critical reception ==
A critic from Sify rated the film 3/5 and wrote, "Despite a cliched [sic] story, the characters and mediocre screenplay makes Evadaithey Nakenti a decent action thriller watchable". G. P. Aditya Vardhan of Rediff.com gave the film 2.5/5 stars and wrote, "Though there is nothing new about the story, there is a flow in the narration which makes the flick watchable". Regarding the Tamil dubbed version, Malini Mannath of Chennai Online wrote, "Its racy narration, the adrenalin-flowing action scenes, and the fiery lines keep you engaged without a boring moment". Another critic from Sify wrote, "On the whole, Rajasekhar and director Viveka Bharati [V. Samudra, Jeevitha] has packaged it as a mass masala entertainer with all essential ingredients like fights, sentiments and glamour in the right mix".
