= Dashamukha =

- Promotional poster
- Directed by: Ravi Srivatsa
- Written by: K. V. Raju
- Produced by: M. B. Babu
- Starring: V. Ravichandran; Ananth Nag; Chetan Kumar
- Cinematography: Mathew Rajan
- Edited by: Lakshman Reddy
- Music by: Sridhar V. Sambhram; Sadhu Kokila
- Production company: Rockline Studios
- Distributed by: Rambabu Productions
- Release date: 13 April 2012
- Country: India
- Language: Kannada

Dashamukha is a 2012 Indian Kannada-language legal drama film directed by Ravi Srivatsa. It has an ensemble cast including V. Ravichandran, Ananth Nag, Devaraj, Avinash, Ravi Kale, Chetan Kumar, Aakanksha Mansukhani and Saritha. The film's score is composed by Sadhu Kokila while the songs are composed by Sridhar V. Sambhram. The film's theatrical release was on 13 April 2012. It is a remake of English film 12 Angry Men.

== Production ==
Filming got underway at Rockline Studios on 12 December 2011. The courtroom set was created by Arun Sagar.

== Cast ==
- V. Ravichandran as Ravindranath R.
- Anant Nag
- Devaraj as Devaraj
- Avinash
- Ravi Kale
- Praveen
- H. G. Dattatreya
- Achyuth Kumar
- Jai Jagadish
- Saritha as Savitha
- Malavika Avinash as Madhuri
- Chetan Kumar as Agni
- Aakanksha Mansukhani as Amrutha
- R. N. Sudarshan
- Ramesh Bhat as judge
- K. V. Manjaiah
- Tennis Krishna

== Soundtrack ==
Dashamukha

Soundtrack album by Sridhar V. Sambhram
- Released: 2012
- Recorded: 2012
- Genre: Feature film soundtrack
- Length: 2:42
- Language: Kannada

Official audio
- Dashamukha - Full Album on YouTube

Track listing
| No. | Title | Singer(s) | Length |
|---|---|---|---|
| 1. | "Yarigu Anjade" | Sridhar V. Sambhram | 2:42 |
| Total length: | | | 02:42 |

== Reception ==
=== Critical response ===
A critic from The Times of India scored the film at 3 out of 5 stars and says "Full marks to Anant Nag, Avinash, Devaraj, Dattanna and Achuyth kumar for the brilliant portrayal of their roles. Chethan and Akanksha have little to do. Camera work by Mathew Rajan is okay. Music by Sridhar Sambhram is melodious". S Viswanath from Deccan Herald wrote "Dashamukha certainly makes your day at movies after a long, long, time and well worth a dekko and all encouragement Srivatsa and his ensemble entertainers deserve. Bravo!". Srikanth Srinivasa from Rediff.com scored the film at 3 out of 5 stars and wrote "Mathew Rajan's cinematography passes muster. Sadhu Kokila's background score is all right. Watch Dashamukha for a different experience. It makes you think". A critic from News18 India wrote "Nothing extraordinary can be said of the camera work, but director Srivatsa's shot-composing is quite good. Dialogues could have been a little more effective. Watch 'Dashamukha' for its different type and level of experience". A critic from Bangalore Mirror wrote "The original play and films were hailed for being culturally significant. Dashamukha is culturally irrelevant, legally unsound andaesthetically reminds you of Gandugali Kumararama; the walls of the set are so obviously fake". A critic from The New Indian Express wrote "Ravi Srivatsa seems to be inspired by the Hollywood film 12 Angry Men. Producer Soorappa Babu has chosen the wrong film to produce casting Ravichandran and other top stars of Kannada film industry. Overall the film is very boring failing to impress audience".
