= Raghu Babu =

Indian actor and comedian

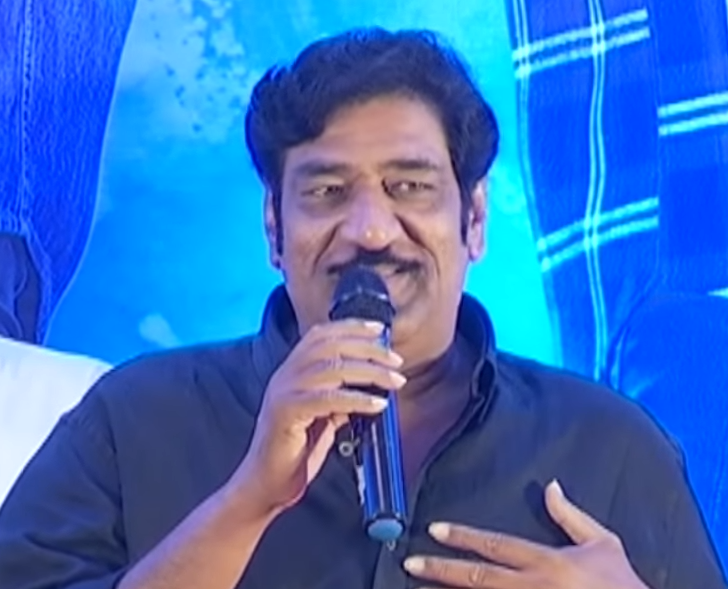
- Raghu Babu in 2024
- Born: Yerra Raghu; 24 June 1964 (age 62); Ravinuthala, Andhra Pradesh, India
- Years active: 1988–present
- Organization: Movie Artists Association
- Father: Giri Babu

Raghu Babu is an Indian film actor and prominent comedian in Telugu cinema. He has appeared in numerous films, primarily in supporting and comic roles.

Raghu Babu is the eldest son of comedian and character actor Giri Babu. His native village is Ravinuthala.

Over the years, he has established himself as a dependable comedic actor in the Telugu film industry. His performances have earned him critical acclaim, including a nomination for a Nandi Award.

As of 2021, he was the General Secretary of the Movie Artists Association.

== Filmography ==
=== Telugu films ===
Year	Title	Role	Notes
1990	Dongalu Unnaru Jagratha		
1992	Mondi Mogudu Penki Pellam		
1994	Neram		
2001	Murari	Erra Babu	
2002	Neetho Cheppalani		
2002	Aadi		
2002	Bharata Simha Reddy		
2002	Chennakesava Reddy	Venkat Reddy's son	
2002	Gemeni		
2002	Khadgam		
2002	Anveshana		
2003	Dhanush		
2003	Kabaddi Kabaddi		
2003	Golmaal		
2003	Raghavendra		
2003	Dil		
2003	Kalyana Ramudu	Subbu	
2003	Shambu		
2003	Charminar		
2003	Okato Number Kurraadu		
2003	Vishnu		
2003	Toli Choopulone		
2003	Ori Nee Prema Bangaram Kaanu		
2003	Sriramachandrulu		
2003	Nenu Seetamahalakshmi		
2003	Missamma	Sub inspector Amzad Basha	
2003	Maa Alludu Very Good		
2003	Neetho Vastha		
2003	Tagore		
2003	Veede		
2003	Missamma	Police Inspector	
2004	Shiva Shankar		
2004	Mr & Mrs Sailaja Krishnamurthy		
2004	Varsham	Bhadranna's henchman	
2004	Seenu Vasanthi Lakshmi		
2004	Preminchukunnam Pelliki Randi		
2004	Aithe Enti		
2004	Andalu Dongale Dorikithe	Simhadri	
2004	Yagnam		
2004	Koduku		
2004	Swamy		
2004	Valliddaru Okkate		
2004	Gowri		
2004	Gudumba Shankar		
2004	Apparao Driving School		
2004	Chanti		
2004	Suryam		
2004	Seenu Vasanthi Lakshmi		
2004	Leela Mahal Center		
2004	Aa Naluguru	Messenger of God	
2004	Sorry Naaku Pellaindi	Girisham	
2004	Aaptudu		
2005	Prayatnam		
2005	Pellam Pichodu	Raghu	
2005	Mr. Errababu		
2005	22 Minutes		
2005	Nuvvostanante Nenoddantana	Rao/Tempo Rao	
2005	786 Khaidi Premakatha		
2005	Arey		
2005	Chakram	Conman	
2005	Bunny	Somaraju's henchman	
2005	Hungama		
2005	Athanokkade	Abdullah	
2005	Jagapati		
2005	Kanchanamala Cable TV		
2005	Please Naaku Pellaindi		
2005	Adirindayya Chandram		
2005	Nayakudu		
2005	Political Rowdy	Dasu	
2005	Allari Pidugu		
2005	Modati Cinema		
2005	Moguds Pellams		
2005	That Is Pandu	Lawyer	
2005	Sri		
2005	Super		
2005	Athadu		
2006	Shock		
2006	Bangaram	Taxi Driver	
2006	Kitakitalu	Lawyer	
2006	Mayajalam		
2006	Ashok	Anjali's brother	
2006	Vikramarkudu	Bauji's brother-in-law	
2006	Astram	Mirchi Malai's assistant	
2006	Brahmastram	A.K. 47	
2006	Photo		
2006	Tata Birla Madhyalo Laila	Fraud Swamiji	
2006	Game	Police Officer	
2006	Chinnodu		
2006	Aadi Lakshmi		
2006	Annavaram		
2006	Sri Ramadasu		
2007	Desamuduru	Hospital compounder	
2007	Evadaithe Nakenti	Pentayya	
2007	Lakshmi Kalyanam		
2007	Adivaram Adavariki Sellavu Kavali		
2007	Okkadunnadu	Marwadi	
2007	Jagadam	Seenu's father	
2007	Bhookailas		
2007	Athili Sattibabu LKG		
2007	Munna	Satti Pandu	
2007	Sri Mahalakshmi		
2007	Raju Bhai		
2007	Dubai Seenu	Panjagutta Sub-Inspector	
2007	Aa Roje		
2007	Lakshyam	Shankar's henchman	
2007	Satyabhama		
2007	Allare Allari	Paidi Raju	
2007	Viyyalavari Kayyalu	Raghu Vamshi's friend	
2007	Yamadonga	Maheshwari's father-in-law's son	
2007	Pagale Vennela		
2007	Tulasi		
2007	Bhajantrilu		
2007	Seema Sastry		
2007	Maisamma IPS		
2007	Godava		
2007	Mee Sreyobhilashi	Mallesh, Bus Driver	
2008	Pourudu	Mastan	
2008	Nee Sukhame Ne Korukunna	Swapna's Brother	
2008	Andariki Vandanalu		
2008	Krishnarjuna		
2008	Ontari		
2008	Lakshmi Putrudu		
2008	Nagaram	Shankar Dada	
2008	John Appa Rao 40 Plus		
2008	Sawaal		
2008	Donga Sachinollu		
2008	Adhyakshaa		
2008	Kantri	Acid Durga	
2008	Hare Ram		
2008	Gajibiji		
2008	Souryam	Athidhi Sastry	
2008	Friends Colony		
2008	Chintakayala Ravi	Krishna Reddy	
2008	Kuberulu		
2009	Sasirekha Parinayam	Abbulu	
2009	Konchem Ishtam Konchem Kashtam		
2009	Mental Krishna		
2009	A Aa E Ee	Bulabbayyi	
2009	Masth		
2009	Drona		
2009	Adhineta		
2009	Kick	Don	
2009	Rajavari Chepala Cheruvu		
2009	Aa Okkadu		
2009	Naa Style Veru		
2009	Current	Guava seller	
2009	Raju Maharaju		
2009	Nachav Alludu		
2009	Sankham	Doctor	
2009	Bendu Apparao R.M.P	Raju's servant	
2009	Rechipo	Zimbabwe	
2009	Jayeebhava	Tiger Paandu	
2009	Katha		
2009	Saleem		
2009	Kasko		
2010	Om Shanti		
2010	Adhurs	Meetha	
2010	Namo Venkatesa	Srinivas	
2010	Bindaas	Raghu	
2010	Kalavar King		
2010	Aakasa Ramanna	Swamiji	
2010	Taj Mahal		
2010	Betting Bangaraju		
2010	Buridi		
2010	Vedam	Dappu Subani	
2010	Panchakshari	Billa Bhai's henchman	
2010	Jhummandi Naadam		
2010	Brahmalokam To Yamalokam Via Bhulokam	Shankar Jackson	
2010	Kothi Muka		
2010	Don Seenu	Tambaraju	
2010	Khaleja	Sundaram	
2010	Brindavanam	Bhoomi's uncle	
2010	Baava		
2010	Kalyanram Kathi	Auto Driver Baasha	
2010	Alasyam Amrutham	Railway Police Officer	
2010	Ragada	Hotel Server	
2010	Ranga The Donga		
2010	Kathi Kantha Rao	Rao Gopal Sharma	
2011	Bhale Mogudu Bhale Pellam		
2011	Oosaravelli	Shiva	
2011	Wanted		
2011	Vareva		
2011	Katha Screenplay Darsakatvam Appalaraju	Rakhi	
2011	Mr. Perfect	Dubey's brother-in-law	
2011	Maaro		
2011	Mayagadu		
2011	Manchivaadu		
2011	Madatha Kaja	Puli	
2011	Veedu Theda	Yugandhar	
2012	Poola Rangadu	Thalapathy (Lala Goud's Assistant)	
2012	Denikaina Ready		
2012	Endhukante... Premanta!		
2012	Daruvu	Pavitrananda Swamiji	
2012	Damarukam	Goke Ring Raju	
2012	Krishnam Vande Jagadgurum	Veeraraju	
2012	Yamudiki Mogudu	Silk Dada	
2012	Naa Ishtam	Ganga	
2013	Ramachari - Eedo Pedda Goodachari	The Lunatic Man	
2013	Ongole Gittha	Dorababu's relative	
2013	Naayak	Babji's henchman	
2013	Sukumarudu		
2013	Mirchi	Deva's aide	
2013	Gunde Jaari Gallanthayyinde	Raghu	
2013	Jaffa	Father Suyodhana	
2013	Tadakha	Hanumanthu	
2013	Balupu	Nanaji's henchman	
2013	Doosukeltha	Swamiji	
2013	Potugadu	Raghu	
2013	Attarintiki Daredi	Murthy	
2013	Bhai	Bhavani's henchman	
2013	Mantra 2		
2014	Race Gurram	Bank Robber	
2014	Alludu Seenu	Nayudu/Lungi Baba	
2014	Aagadu	Firangi	
2014	Loukyam	Leela	
2014	Pilla Nuvvu Leni Jeevitham	Yadigiri	
2014	Jump Jilani	Dharmaraju	
2014	Govindudu Andarivadele	Abhiram’s friend	
2014	Jaihind 2	Nandhini’s father	
2014	Erra Bus		
2014	Rough		
2014	Sri Vasavi Kanyaka Parameswari Charitra	Muthyalu	
2015	Gaddam Gang	Doctor	
2015	Rey		
2015	Pandaga Chesko	Raghupathi	
2015	Krishnamma Kalipindi Iddarini		
2015	James Bond		
2015	Kick 2	Balwanth Singh Thakur	
2015	Raju Gari Gadhi	Chekodi	
2015	Shankarabaranam		
2015	Soukhyam	Deva	
2015	Keechaka	Idli seller	
2016	O Malli	Ramulayya	
2016	Dictator	Vasthu Bheeshmacharya	
2016	Supreme	Bellam Sridevi's father	
2016	Sardaar Gabbar Singh	Govinda	
2016	A Aa	Raghu, Lata's affair	
2016	Thikka	Narasimha	
2016	Jaguar	Raghu	
2016	Meelo Evaru Koteeswarudu	Roldgold Ramesh	
2017	Khaidi No. 150	Chef	
2017	Nenu Local	Siddharth's father	
2017	Winner	Dharmendra Reddy's P.A.	
2017	Guru	Soomulu	
2017	Mister	Vodka Prasad	
2017	Rarandoi Veduka Chudham	Bhaskar	
2017	Patel S. I. R.	Minister	
2017	Nakshatram	SI Ramdas	
2017	Mahanubhavudu	Doctor	
2017	Oye Ninne	Veda’s father	
2017	Raja the Great	SI Babu Rao	
2017	Balakrishnudu	Peddha Paleru	
2018	Agnyaathavaasi	Koteswara Rao	
2018	Chalo	Principal Paramathma	
2018	Juvva	Bhogam	
2018	Raa Raa		
2018	Nela Ticket	Aditya's assistant	
2018	Jamba Lakidi Pamba		
2018	Saakshyam	Siva Prasad's assistant	
2018	Sailaja Reddy Alludu	Raghu	
2018	Amar Akbar Anthony	Gandikota	
2019	F2: Fun and Frustration	MLA Anji Reddy	
2019	Chikati Gadilo Chithakotudu	Jack	
2019	Chanakya	Bank Manager	
2019	Sye Raa Narasimha Reddy	Raghavachari	
2019	Tenali Ramakrishna BA. BL	Durga Rao	
2019	Bhagyanagara Veedullo Gamattu		
2019	Venky Mama	Advocate Happy Hanumantha Rao	
2020	Sarileru Neekevvaru	Teacher Tirupati Rao	
2020	Disco Raja	Giri	
2020	Jaanu	Watchman Kapala Devudu	
2020	Bheeshma	Balram	
2020	Eureka	College Chairman	
2020	Anukunnadi Okkati Ayyandhi Okati	News Channel Owner	
2021	Zombie Reddy	Young Aagam Reddy	
2021	A1 Express	Raghu	
2021	Gaali Sampath	Veerabhadram	
2021	Mosagallu	Swamiji	
2021	Aranya	Maaran/Singa’s uncle	
2021	Ee Kathalo Pathralu Klalpitham		
2021	Sridevi Soda Center	Narsayya	
2021	Pelli SandaD		
2022	Induvadana		
2022	Son of India		
2022	Bheemla Nayak	Balaji	
2022	Acharya	Drug Supplier (Basava's Henchmen)	
2022	Ghani	Eswarnath's assistant	
2022	F3	Venky's companion	
2022	Ammu	Beggar	
2022	Ginna	Village President	
2022	Like, Share & Subscribe	Prasad Rao	
2022	Itlu Maredumilli Prajaneekam	Koteswara Rao	
2022	Dhamaka	Goon	
2022	18 Pages	Office Client	
2023	Veera Simha Reddy	Durga Reddy	
2023	Waltair Veerayya	Corrupt Defense Lawyer	
2023	Katha Venuka Katha		
2023	Unstoppable	Sarangapani	
2023	Samajavaragamana	Bala Saraswathi	
2023	Bhola Shankar	House owner	
2023	Mad	Principal Purushottam	
2024	Guntur Kaaram	Rangam	
2024	Prathinidhi 2		
2024	Vidya Vasula Aham	Vasu’s boss	
2024	Darling	Murthy	
2024	Tiragabadara Saami		
2024	OMG: O Manchi Ghost		
2024	Laggam	Dubai Tirupathi	
2024	Lucky Baskhar	Beggar	
2025	Game Changer	Party worker	
2025	Thalli Manasu		
2025	Coffee with a Killer		
2025	Brahma Anandam	Manohar’s father	
2025	Ramam Raghavam	Raja	
2025	Mazaka		
2025	Mad Square	Principal Purushottam	
2025	Jigel		
2025	LYF: Love Your Father		
2025	Hari Hara Veera Mallu	Munimanikhyam	
2025	Sundarakanda	Siddharth’s manager	
2025	Andhra King Taluka	Film producer	
2026	Mana Shankara Vara Prasad Garu	Intelligence Officer	
2026	Nari Nari Naduma Murari	Judge	
2026	S Saraswathi	Principal Rambabu	
2026	Sampradayini Suppini Suddapoosani	Miravali	
2026	Papam Prathap		
2027	#VenkyAnil5 - NKRAR2 †		

=== Other language films ===
Year	Title	Role	Language	Notes
1994	Uzhiyan	Subramani's henchman	Tamil	
2007	Police Story 2		Kannada	
2014	Abhimanyu	Nandhini's father	Kannada	Uncredited role
2016	Jaguar	CBI Officer Raghu	Kannada	
2021	Kaadan	Maaran's uncle	Tamil	
2024	Jolly O Gymkhana	Telugu-speaking thug	Tamil	
2026	Vishwanath & Sons	Judge Shanmugham	Tamil	

=== Television ===
- Vasantha Kokila (serial)
- Muttaiduva (DD serial)
- Lady Detective (ETV serial)
- Antharangalu (ETV serial)
- Vidhi (ETV serial)
- Arabia Kadali
- Mayasabha
- Super Subbu (Netflix)
