= Ranam (2021 film) =

2021 Indian Kannada-language film

- Directed by: V. Samudra
- Written by: V. Samudra
- Produced by: Kanakapura Srinivas
- Starring: Chiranjeevi Sarja Deepti Sati
- Cinematography: Niranjan Babu
- Edited by: Deepu S Kumar
- Music by: Ravi Shankar; Chinna
- Production company: RS Productions
- Release date: 26 March 2021
- Country: India
- Language: Kannada

Ranam is a 2021 Indian Kannada-language film written and directed by V. Samudra starring Chiranjeevi Sarja, Deepti Sati, Chetan Kumar and Varalaxmi Sarathkumar with a music score by Ravi Shankar and Chinna and cinematography by Niranjan Babu it was released in India on 26 March 2021. The film marks Sarja's penultimate and posthumous appearance following his untimely demise on 7 June 2020.

== Plot ==
The story tells about four students who take it upon themselves to solve the problems being faced by farmers and decide to take on corrupt politicians.

== Cast ==
- Chiranjeevi Sarja
- Deepti Sati
- Chetan Kumar
- Varalaxmi Sarathkumar
- Amir Ali Shaik
- Rahul Dev
- Sadhu Kokila
- Neethu Gowda
- Preeti Sharma

== Production ==
Ranam is 21st cinema for the producer R Srinivas The film was supposed to be released in 2020 itself due to COVID-19 the move had a delayed-release. The movie was supposed to be released as the first Kannada move after lockdown. Ranam was the last film for Chiranjeevi Sarja.

== Soundtrack ==
No.	Title	Singer(s)	Length
1.	"Geleyane Jeevavu"	Santhosh Venky, Anuradha Bhat
2.	"Ranaranga"	Anirudh Ravichander, Ravi Shankar
3.	"Manasare Ninna Nodi"	Vijay Prakash, Chinmayi, Hamsika Iyer
4.	"Yaare Illade"	Karthik
5.	"Anusuya Anusuya"	Anita, Diwakar
6.	"Kanneduru Nenniralu"	Asit Tripathy, Deepali
7.	"Nanna Istave Neenadu"	Mukesh, Rita

== Reception ==
Reviewing Ranam for The Times of India, Sunayana Suresh gave two stars from five. Suresh concluded: "Chiranjeevi, as the tough cop, is good, but the rest of the film does not hold up to that".
