= Surya Prakash (director) =

Indian film director (1968–2024)

- Born: 1968
- Died: 27 May 2024 (aged 56)
- Occupation: Director

Surya Prakash (1968 – 27 May 2024) was an Indian film director who worked on Tamil and Telugu-language films. He made his directorial debut with Manikkam (1996), before making the action films, Maayi (2000) and Diwan (2003).

== Career ==
Surya Prakash began his career by directing Manikkam (1996) featuring Rajkiran, before working on the unreleased Pen Ondru Kanden featuring Prabhu in the lead role during 1998. He later returned to make two action films featuring Sarathkumar in the early 2000s, Maayi (2000) and Diwan (2003). He also worked on Bharata Simha Reddy (2002), a Telugu film, which fetched negative reviews.

Surya Prakash subsequently failed to garner offers to helm big-budget films and worked on the village-centric romance film Varusanadu in the early 2010s. He revealed that the film was based on the real-life romance of his cousin and the film featured newcomers Kumaran and Srushti Dange. The film is yet to have a theatrical release. In 2014, he directed Adhibar (2015), an action thriller, featuring Jeevan in the lead role.

== Death ==
Prakash died from a heart attack on 27 May 2024, aged 56.

== Filmography ==
Year	Film	Notes
1996	Manikkam	
2000	Maayi	
2002	Bharata Simha Reddy	Telugu film
2003	Diwan	
2015	Adhibar	
