= Mullur =

- village
- Country: India
- State: Karnataka
- District: Bengaluru
- Talukas: Bengaluru East Taluk

Government
  - Type: Panchayat raj
  - Body: Gram panchayat

Population (2001)
  - Total: roughly 2,000

Languages
  - Official: Kannada
- Time zone: UTC+5:30 (IST)
- PIN: 560 035
- ISO 3166 code: IN-KA
- Vehicle registration: KA
- Nearest city: Kolar, Bengaluru
- Website: karnataka.gov.in

Mullur is a village near Sarjapur road in Karnataka, India. It is in Bengaluru East Taluk, Bengaluru District in Karnataka. An adjacent village is Gunjur via Kachamaranahalli. The distance from Vidhana Soudha is 22 km.out of the village there is one school called Sri Sri Ravishankar vidhya mandir and there is a railway station 3.5 km from the village.

== Demographics ==
As of the 2001 India census, Mullur had a population of around 2000.

== Temples ==
There are three temples in the village: one being to Goddess Maheshwari, the most powerful one; another old temple, Gopalaswamy temple; and the latest one is the Sri Rama Temple.

== See also ==
- Thrissur
- Districts of Kerala
