= Maayi =

- Poster
- Directed by: Surya Prakash
- Written by: Surya Prakash
- Produced by: R. B. Choudary
- Starring: R. Sarathkumar; Meena
- Cinematography: S. Saravanan
- Edited by: V. Jaishankar
- Music by: S. A. Rajkumar
- Production company: Super Good Films
- Release date: 25 August 2000
- Country: India
- Language: Tamil

Maayi is a 2000 Indian Tamil-language action drama film written and directed by Surya Prakash, starring Sarathkumar and Meena in the lead roles, while Vadivelu, Vijayakumar, Sabitha Anand, Suvalakshmi, Rajan P. Dev, and Anand play supporting roles. The film was a commercial hit, and Vadivelu's comedy performance was critically acclaimed.

The film was later remade into Telugu as Simharasi (2001) and in Kannada as Narasimha (2012).

== Plot ==
Maayi is a well-respected do-gooder in a village. He considers women in the village as his sisters and even helps financially to conduct their weddings. He is a man who is ready to kill his father Irulandi when he learns that the latter had a second wife, but Irulandi opts to kill himself rather than face his son, and so Maayi brings his half-sister Lakshmi to live with him. A local MLA, Sundarapandiyan, comes to Maayi to get his support during the upcoming election, but he refuses and Sundarapandiyan loses the election. But his son, who admires Maayi, marries Lakshmi.

Meanwhile, Bhuvaneswari, Maayi's distant relative's daughter, comes to the village from Bangalore and initially misunderstands Maayi by seeing his looks but later realises her mistake after knowing about Maayi's hard work and his help towards improving the village. Maayi has built free hospitals, daycare centres, colleges, etc. to help the villagers. Bhuvana is attracted towards Maayi and proposes to him, but Maayi does not accept her love. But Bhuvana remains confident about marrying Maayi, following which he tells his flashback.

Maayi was born into a poor family where his mother Nachiyamma was infected by leprosy even before his birth. Due to poor financial condition, Nachiyamma could not be treated in a hospital and instead was kept alone in a room. She was not allowed to touch her son Maayi fearing chances of the disease being spread. Maayi has never seen his mother right from his childhood as she always stays in a closed room. When Maayi was eight years old, his mother gets frustrated more as her disease prevents her to show her affection towards Maayi, and she commits suicide by drowning in a river. This shocks Maayi, and he decides not to marry any woman as he does not want any girl to touch his body, which was even untouched by his beloved mother.

Maayi convinces Bhuvana to marry someone else. He also learns that Lakshmi is being tortured by her husband and that it was all a plan to take revenge on Maayi for not supporting Sundarapandiyan during elections. Maayi beats up Lakshmi's husband and says that he will never support criminal activities even if it impacts his family. On the day of Bhuvana's wedding, the bridegroom's family misunderstands that Maayi and Bhuvana are lovers, seeing Maayi's dhoti in her room, and stops the marriage. Bhuvana's friend discloses the truth that Maayi gave his dhoti to safeguard her when her dresses were washed away in water sometime back. Manorama, who also belongs the village, shouts at the groom's family for their cruel thoughts and requests Maayi to marry Bhuvana as that would be the right thing. Maayi obeys Manorama's words as his mother's and marries Bhuvana.

== Cast ==
- R. Sarathkumar as Maayaandi (Maayi)
- Meena as Bhuvaneswari
- Vadivelu as Mokkaisamy
- Vijayakumar as Irulandi
- Sabitha Anand as Nachiyamma
- Suvalakshmi as Lakshmi
- Rajan P. Dev as MLA Sundarapandiyan
- Anand as Sundarapandiyan's son
- Sathyapriya as Bhuvana's mother
- Manorama as Pecchiyammal, Maayandi's foster mother
- Manivannan as Rajavelu, Maayandi's paternal uncle
- Kovai Sarala as Raakaayi
- Kaka Radhakrishnan as Mokkaisamy's father
- Minnal Deepa as Minnal
- Ponnambalam as a corrupt police officer
- Thiyagu as Sundarapandiyan's Assistant
- Bava Lakshmanan as Minnal's father
- Suryakanth as Raasu
- Singamuthu as a Bus driver, guest appearance
- Muthukaalai
- Pasi Sathya
- Dharini
- Nambirajan
- Bayilvan Ranganathan as Police constable
- Indhu
- Mahendran as Young Maayandi
- Manthra in a Special Appearance
- Riyaz Khan as a Marriage guest (uncredited)
- Raju Sundaram as dancer in song "Thennagam Aalum"

== Production ==
Sarathkumar performed a stunt in the film by jumping from a height of 80 feet (24 m) without the use of a rope. A bungalow was built on a 25-acre land in Udumalaipettai which was bought for the film's shoot.

== Soundtrack ==
Soundtrack was composed by S. A. Rajkumar.

Song	Singers	Lyrics
"Megam Udaithu"(Version l)	S. Janaki, Rajesh	R Ravishankar
"Nilave Vaan Nilave"	Sujatha	Ilayakamban
"Ola Ola"	Swarnalatha, Arunmozhi	Ilayakamban
"Sooriyane"	S. Janaki	R Ravishankar
"Thennagam Aalum"	S. P. Balasubrahmanyam	Mu. Metha
"Megam Udaithu"(Version ll)	Vasundhara Das, Rajesh	R Ravishankar

== Controversy ==
In March 2000, the Puthiya Tamilagam threatened to stall the release of Maayi, with its then leader K. Krishnasamy alleging that while the film revisits the 1957 Ramnad riots, it "totally blacks out the Dalit hero Immanuel who died in the riots" and the Thevar community were "lionised" onscreen. However, Surya Prakash insisted that the film was less about caste and more a "commercial" entertainer.

== Critical reception ==
Malathi Rangarajan of The Hindu wrote, "The movement of the story is rather slow at times, especially in the second half because there is not much happening. But it manages to sustain one's interest". Krishna Chidambaram of Kalki praised Sarathkumar's characterisation, emotional flashback, Raju Sundaram's choreography and Vadivelu's humour but panned the stunt choreography as unrealistic and concluded saying if these flaws are discounted, we can safely say that it is a sensible film. Malini Mannath of Chennai Online wrote "'Mayi' is 'Nattamai' and 'Chinna Gounder' gone a bit too far!".

India Info wrote, "If you like masala rustic style, then Mayee is your cup of tea otherwise give it a go by". K. N. Vijiyan of New Straits Times wrote, "Sarath Kumar's portrayal saves this movie and he remains the sole reason for seeing the film". Dinakaran wrote, "The flashback part in the film is a unique feature. The film moves slowly in the latter part [...] Yet the director Suryapraksh has succeeded in sustaining the interest of the audience by effecting a good treatment for the film".

== Legacy ==
Following Surya Prakash's death in 2024, The Indian Express noted that the film became his breakthrough.
