= Rajasekhar (actor) =

Indian film actor

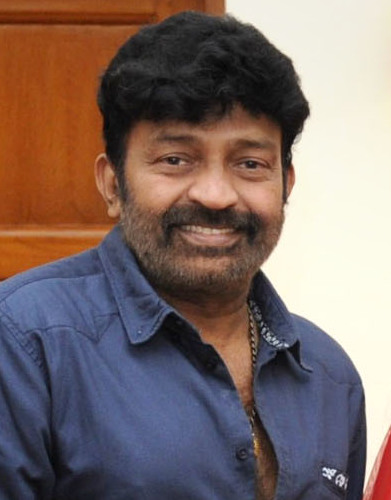
- Rajashekhar in 2015
- Born: Rajasekhar Varadharajan; 4 February 1962 (age 64); Lakshmipuram, Madras State, India
- Occupation: Actor
- Years active: 1985-present
- Spouse: Jeevitha (m. 1991)
- Children: 2
- Relatives: Selva (brother)

Rajasekhar (born 4 February 1962) is an Indian actor known for his works primarily in Telugu cinema. In a career spanning more than 40 years, he has acted in over 80 Telugu films in a variety of roles. He starred in several notable films, including Talambralu, Sruthilayalu, Aahuti, Ankusam, Magaadu, Allari Priyudu, Anna, Omkaram, Suryudu, Sivayya, Manasunna Maaraju, Maa Annayya, Simharasi, Evadaithe Nakenti, Gorintaku, and PSV Garuda Vega. Rajasekhar won two Filmfare Best Actor Awards - Telugu for Magaadu and Anna.

The Nature Waldorf School is owned by Rajasekhar and Jeevitha, to whom he is married. The school is affiliated to Dr. Rajasekhar Charitable Trust and started its operations in July 2010. The mission of the school is to impart non-commercialised education to students.

== Early life ==
Rajasekhar was born on 4 February 1962 in Lakshmipuram, Theni district, Tamil Nadu. Although his mother tongue is Tamil, he identifies himself as Telugu. His father, Varadharajan Gopal, originally from Chittoor district, worked as a Sub-Inspector of Police in Guntur district, where his mother, Andalu, also hails from. According to Rajasekhar, the family migrated to Tamil Nadu and later returned to Andhra Pradesh. His brother, Selva, has acted in Tamil films as a lead actor. Before entering the film industry, Rajasekhar studied medicine (M.B.B.S.) and practiced in Aminjikarai, Chennai while also studying acting course at Adyar film institute to pursue his acting dreams.

Rajasekhar is a practicing Saiva Hindu, after undergoing a transformative personal experience during his formative years.

== Personal life ==
He married erstwhile actress Jeevitha and has two daughters. Their younger daughter Shivathmika debuted with Dorasaani, in 2019 while their elder daughter Shivani debuted with Adbhutham, in 2021.

Recently, Jeevitha was named as one of the nine members of the Central Board of Film Certification (CBFC), with Pahlaj Nihalani as chairman.

== Career ==
Rajashekhar made his acting debut in Tamil with Pudhumai Penn (1984) and also had a character role in Puthiya Theerpu (1985) with Vijayakanth. His Telugu film debut was in 1985 with Vande Mataram. Since then, he has acted in variety of films such as Pratighatana, Repati Pourulu, Station Master, Sruthilayalu, Kashmora, Aradhana, Talambralu, Aruna Kiranam, Mamatala Kovela and Akka Mogudu.

Some of his notable films include Aahuthi, Aartanaadam Nyayam Kosam, Ankusam, Magaadu, Rowdyism Nasinchali, Papa Kosam, Moratodu Naa Mogudu, Anna, Balarama Krishnulu, Agraham, Sivayya, and Evadaithe Nakenti. He is known as the angry young man of Telugu cinema.

He has acted in more than 75 movies though he is mocked for his diction. His voice for most of his Telugu movies was dubbed by Telugu actor Saikumar till 1996 and then was taken over by Srinivasa Moorthy who started dubbing for him in 1997, when he won his first Nandi award for the movie Sivayya. Except for the 2003 film Villain, where Sai's younger brother P. Ravi Shankar dubbed for both Rajasekhar and Vijayan, respectively.

Later, he also gained fame for his family drama films such as Maa Aayana Bangaram, Suryudu, Simharasi, Maa Annayya, Deergha Sumangali Bhava, Manasunna Maaraju and Gorintaku. He was also applauded for his performance in the romance film Allari Priyudu.

He is considered a versatile actor. His performance in Omkaram is a classic example of that, which was directed by Kannada director Upendra. His electrifying performance in the movie Sheshu was applauded critically. His biggest hit of the career came in the year 2007 with Evadaithe Nakenti and his last genuine hit as a lead actor was Gorintaku in the year 2008 until he again tasted success with PSV Garuda Vega in 2017.

Ithu Thaanda Police, the Tamil dub of Ankusam was a hit. His Telugu films were dubbed in Tamil such as Magaadu as Meesaikaran.

== Filmography ==
- All films are in Telugu, unless otherwise noted.

Key
†	Denotes films that have not yet been released

Year	Film	Role	Notes
1984	Pudhumai Penn	Rajasekhar	Tamil film
1985	Puthiya Theerpu	Bhaskar	Tamil film
1985	Vande Mataram	Satyam	
1985	Pratighatana	Prakash	
1986	Ee Prasnaku Baduledi		
1986	Dora Bidda		
1986	Challani Ramayya Chakkani Sitamma		
1986	Talambralu		
1986	Repati Pourulu		
1986	Aruna Kiranam		
1986	Kashmora	Darkha	
1986	Mr. Bharath	Prakash	
1987	America Abbayi		
1987	Prajaswamyam	Ashok	
1987	Aahuthi		
1987	Yuga Kartalu	Raju	
1987	Idaa Prapancham		
1987	Sruthilayalu	Narayana Murthy	
1987	Aradhana	Lawrence	
1988	Nyayam Kosam		
1988	Nava Bharatam		
1988	Annapurnamma Gaari Alludu		
1988	Neeku Naaku Pellanta		
1988	Mr. Hero		
1988	Indra Dhanassu		
1988	Station Master	Rama Rao	
1988	Bava Marudula Saval	Inspector Jai Kumar	
1989	Aarta Nadam		
1989	Mamatala Kovela		
1989	Ankusam		
1989	Prajaa Teerpu		
1989	Chennapatnam Chinnollu		
1989	Yamapasam		
1989	Dharma Yuddham		
1989	Manchivaaru Maavaaru		
1989	Vinta Dongalu		
1990	Rowdyism Nasinchali		
1990	Silasasanam		
1990	Papa Kosam		
1990	Magaadu		
1991	Aagraham		
1992	Moratodu Naa Mogudu		
1992	Akka Mogudu		
1992	Ahankari		
1992	Balarama Krishnulu	Krishna Murthy	
1993	Amma Koduku		
1993	Allari Priyudu	Raja	
1994	Gangmaster	Raja	
1994	Anga Rakshakudu		
1994	Aavesam		
1994	Anna	Komaranna	
1995	Raja Simham	Major Raj Kumar / Chinna Raja and Shrimannarayana	
1995	Ghatotkachudu	Karna	Cameo appearance
1996	Vetagadu		
1997	Ratha Yatra		
1997	Omkaram	Satya	
1997	Maa Aayana Bangaram		
1998	Suryudu	Suryam	
1998	Deergha Sumangali Bhava	Rama Rao	
1998	Sivayya	Sivayya	
1999	Neti Gandhi		
1999	Bobbili Vamsam	Raghava Rayudu	
1999	Mechanic Mavayya	Raju/Siva	
2000	Ravanna	Ravanna	
2000	Okkadu Chaalu	Surya	
2000	Manasunna Maaraju	Dorababu	
2000	Maa Annayya	Madhu and Gopalam	
2001	Simharasi	Narasimharaju	
2001	Subhakaryam		
2002	Seshu	Seshu	
2002	Bharatasimha Reddy	Raja / Devudayya	
2003	Aayudham	Siddartha	
2003	Villain	Siva and Vishnu	
2004	Aaptudu	Bose	
2005	Nayakudu	Raju	
2006	Rajababu	Rajababu	
2007	Evadaithe Nakenti	Major Surya	Also writer
2008	Gorintaku	Ashok and Sarvarayudu	
2009	Satyameva Jayate	DCP Sathya	Also writer
2009	Naa Style Veru	Sivaram	
2010	Maa Annayya Bangaram	Sivaji	
2013	Mahankali	ACP Mahankali	Also writer
2015	Gaddam Gang	Daasu	
2017	PSV Garuda Vega	Pullela Chandrashekhar	
2019	Kalki	Kalki IPS	
2020	Arjuna		
2021	Deyyam	Shankar	
2022	Shekhar	Sekhar	
2023	Extra Ordinary Man	IG Vijay Chakravarthy	
2026	Biker	Bullet Sunil Narayan	

== Awards ==
- Nandi Award for Best Villain - Talambralu (1986)
- Filmfare Award for Best Actor - Telugu - Magaadu (1990)
- Filmfare Award for Best Actor - Telugu - Anna (1994)
