= Giri Babu =

Indian actor, producer and director (1943–2026)

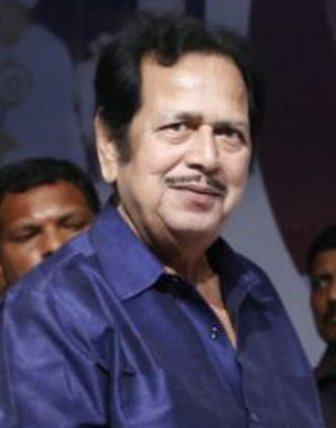
- Giri Babu in 2017
- Born: Yerra Seshagiri Rao; 8 June 1943; Ravinuthala, Prakasam district, Madras Province, British India
- Died: 14 November 2026 (aged 83); Hyderabad, Telangana, India
- Occupations: Actor; producer; director
- Children: Raghu Babu , Bosu Babu , Madhavi

Yerra Seshagiri Rao (8 June 1943 – 14 November 2026), popularly known as Giri Babu, was an Indian actor, producer and director who primarily worked in Telugu films. His son, Raghu Babu, is also a notable actor-director.

== Career ==
Giri Babu hailed from a middle-class agricultural family in Ravinuthala village of the Prakasam district. He moved to Madras to pursue a career in films. Babu started his career as a lead actor but later started portraying antagonistic and comic roles.

== Personal life and death ==
Babu had two sons, including Raghu Babu. Giri Babu died in Hyderabad on 14 November 2026, at the age of 83.

== Filmography ==
=== Director ===
Year	Title	Notes
1985	Ranarangam	
1990	Indrajith	starring his second son Bose Babu
2008	Nee Sukhame Ne Koruthunna	Also producer

=== Producer ===
Year	Title	Notes
1978	Simha Garjana	
1984	Merupu Daadi	
1990	Indrajith	
2008	Nee Sukhame Ne Koruthunna	Also director

=== Actor ===
Year	Title	Role	Note
1973	Jagame Maya Jyothi-Laxmi		
1974	Chandee Bangaru Kalalu		
1974	Dorababu	Shankar	
1975	Zamindarugari Ammayi	Sundar	
1975	Annadammula Anubandham		
1976	Jyothi	Shankara	
1976	Maa Daivam		
1976	Vadhu Varulu		
1976	Swami Drohulu		
1976	Raaja	Jimmy	
1977	Kurukshetram	Dushasana	
1977	Premalekhalu		
1977	Manassakthi		
1977	Indra Dhanussu		
1977	Devathalara Deevinchandi		
1977	Kalpana	Seshu	
1978	Indradhanussu	Gopal	
1978	Dongala Dopidi	Havaldar Adisankara Varaprasada Rao	
1978	Patnavasam	Vasu	
1978	Simha Garjana		
1978	Mallepoovu		
1978	Dudu Basavanna	Kotayya	
1978	Kumara Raja		
1978	Karunamayudu	Saint John	
1978	Shri Rama Raksha		
1978	Sahasavanthudu	Mohan	
1978	Athani Kante Ghanudu		
1979	Naa Illu Naa Vaalu		
1979	Seete Ramudaithe	Giri	
1979	Kothala Raayudu	Inspector Ramu	
1979	Cheyyethi Jai Kottu	Ranga	
1979	Swami Drohulu		
1980	Bhola Shankarudu		
1980	Kaksha		
1980	Mayadari Krishnudu		
1980	Kiladi Krishnudu	Kishore	
1980	Ragile Hrudayalu	Giri	
1980	Adrushtavanthudu	Ravi Babu	
1981	Erra Mallelu		
1981	Ragile Jwala		
1981	Oorukichina Maata	Forest Guard	
1981	Babulugaadi Debba		
1982	Sawaal		
1982	Nivuru Gappina Nippu		
1982	Madhura Swapnam		
1982	Naa Desam	Kumar	
1982	Bangaru Bhoomi	Hari Babu	
1982	Jagannatha Rathachakralu	Nagaraju	
1982	Pratigna	Seshagiri	
1982	Gruha Pravesam		
1982	Kalavari Samsaram	Raghu	
1983	Shakti	Giri	
1983	Mayagadu	Nagaraju	
1983	Mundadugu		
1983	Chattaniki Veyyi Kallu	Gurunatham	
1983	Palleturi Pidugu	Arjun	
1983	Moogavani Paga	Pachchabotu Narasimha aka P.N. Simha	
1983	Dharma Poratam	Bhaskar	
1983	Adavi Simhalu		
1983	Mugguru Monagallu		
1983	Shivudu Shivudu Shivudu		
1983	Lanke Bindelu	Gopi's brother-in-law	
1984	Sardar	Public Prosecutor	
1984	Kanchu Kagada	Narasimhappa	
1984	Kode Trachu	Thatthar Bitthar	
1984	Rustum		
1984	Padmavyuham	Head Constable Hanumanthayya	
1984	Bhale Ramudu	Seshu	
1984	Raraju		
1984	Aparadhi		
1984	Merupu Daadi	Gandadu	
1984	Srimathi Kaavali		
1984	Griha Lakshmi		
1984	Nayakulaku Saval	Nagaraju	
1984	Bangaru Kapuram	Giri	
1984	Mahanagaramlo Mayagadu		
1984	Inti Guttu		
1985	Muchataga Mugguru		
1985	Surya Chandra		
1985	Maha Manishi		
1985	Rechukka	Dada	
1985	Jackie		
1985	Mayadari Maridi		
1985	Mugguru Mitrulu		
1985	Surya Chandra		
1985	Bangaru Chilaka	Vikram	
1985	Ranarangam		
1985	Garjana	Seshagiri	
1985	Intiko Rudramma	Jagannath	
1985	Edadugula Bandham	Giri	
1985	Vijetha	Narasimham's third son	
1986	Ravana Brahma	Shyam Babu	
1986	Ide Naa Samadhanam	Viswanath	
1986	Simhasanam	Ugra Rahu Army chief of Avanthi	
1986	Challani Ramayya Chakkani Seethamma		
1986	Naa Pilupe Prabhanjanam	Balaji	
1986	Ugra Narasimham	Giri	
1986	Jayam Manade		
1986	Khaidi Rudraiah	Venkatagiri Giri	
1986	Vivaha Bandham		
1986	Sakkanodu		
1986	Vetagallu	Sripathi	
1986	Adavi Raja	Nagendra	
1986	Vijrumbhana	Dr. Anand	
1987	Dongodochadu	Giri	
1987	Veera Pratap	Vikram	
1987	Pasivadi Pranam		
1987	Donga Kapuram		
1987	Lawyer Bharathi Devi		
1987	Thene Manasulu	Bhairava Murthy	
1987	Nene Raja Nene Mantri		
1987	Inti Donga		
1987	Jebu Donga	Venkat	
1987	Muddayi	Jaganmohan Rao	
1987	Sankharavam	Uday	
1987	Donga Garu Swagatham	Mushti Prahlada Rao	
1987	Chaitanya Ratham	Avinash	
1987	Viswanatha Nayakudu	Shanmukha Raju, Son of Ummathur Sivaganga Raju	
1987	Marana Homam		
1987	Paga Saadhista	Kali	
1988	Chuttalabbayi		
1988	Tiragabadda Telugubidda		
1988	Nyayaniki Siksha	Chakradhar	
1988	August 15 Raatri		
1988	Bharatamlo Bala Chandrudu		
1988	Inspector Pratap		
1988	Donga Pelli		
1988	Rocky		
1988	Collector Vijaya		
1988	Raktha Tilakam		
1988	Mugguru Kodukulu	Ranga Rao	
1988	Chikkadu Dorakadu	Chinnodu Sivam	
1988	Agni Keratalu	Phanindra	
1989	Goonda Rajyam		
1989	Gudachari 117	Gookarnam	
1989	Vicky Daada	Lawyer Giridhar Rao	
1989	Sahasame Naa Oopiri		
1989	Naa Mogudu Naake Sontham		
1989	Ayyappa Swamy Mahatyam		
1989	Dorikithe Dongalu		
1989	Swathi Chinukulu		
1989	Krishna Gari Abbayi		
1989	Bala Gopaludu		
1989	Simha Swapnam		
1989	Paila Pachessu		
1989	Soggadi Kapuram	Guruvulu	
1989	Ajatha Satruvu	Sivaram	
1989	Koduku Diddina Kapuram	Kondaiah	
1989	Athaku Yamudu Ammayiki Mogudu		
1990	Anna Thammudu	Seshagiri	
1990	Prema Yuddham		
1990	Alajadi		
1990	Prajala Manishi	Giri	
1990	Kadapa Reddemma		
1991	Vidhata	Nagaraju	
1991	Nirnayam	Police Commissioner	
1991	Naa Pellam Naa Ishtam		
1991	Palleturi Pellam		
1991	Chitram Bhalare Vichitram		
1991	Parama Sivudu		
1991	Alludu Diddina Kapuram	Panthulu	
1992	Killer	Malavika's husband	
1992	Gangwar		
1992	Pachani Samsaram		
1992	Sahasam		
1992	Golmaal Govindam		
1992	Pellam Chatu Mogudu		
1992	Mondi Mogudu Penki Pellam		
1992	Pellam Chepithe Vinali		
1992	Sriman Brahmachari		
1992	Pelli Neeku Shobhanam Naaku		
1992	Parvathalu Panakalu		
1992	420		
1992	Chillari Mogudu Allari Koduku		
1993	Chinna Alludu		
1993	Prema Pusthakam		
1993	Asale Pellaina Vanni		
1993	Police Lockup		
1993	Illu Pelli		
1993	Aarambham		
1993	Pellama Majaka		
1993	Alibaba Aradajanu Dongalu		
1993	Evandi Aavida Vachindi		
1993	Parugo Parugu	Veeru	
1994	Hello Brother	Manga's father	
1994	Gandeevam		
1994	Bhale Mavayya		
1994	Neram		
1994	Kishkindha Kanda		
1994	Jailor Gaari Abbayi		
1994	Atha Kodalu		
1994	Lucky Chance		
1994	Prema & Co.		
1994	Presidentgari Alludu	Ramachandra Prasad	
1994	Kurradhi Kurradu	Giri Bab	
1994	Brahmachari Mogudu	Kutumba Rao	
1994	Bhairava Dweepam	Uttar	
1994	Bangaru Kutumbam	Pushpa's brother-in-law	
1994	Hello Alludu		
1995	Vajram	Chakri's uncle	
1995	Bhale Bullodu		
1995	Ooriki Monagadu		
1995	Adavi Dora		
1995	Maatho Pettukoku		
1995	Chilakapachcha Kapuram		
1995	Ammaleni Puttillu		
1995	Ghatotkachudu	Dharma Raju	
1995	Alluda Majaka	Lawyer Sivaramakrishna	
1995	Sisindri		
1996	Ninne Pelladata	Hari	
1996	Once More		
1996	Jabilamma Pelli		
1996	Hello Neeku Naaku Pellanta		
1996	Maavichiguru		
1996	Little Soldiers	Seshagiri	
1997	Ugadi		
1997	Paddukondi Chuddam		
1997	Thoka Leni Pitta		
1997	Aahwanam		
1997	Nayanamma		
1997	Kurralla Rajyam		
1997	Pelli		
1998	Aavida Maa Aavide	Vikranth's father	
1998	Chandralekha	Doctor	
1998	O Panaipothundi Babu		
1998	Suprabhatam		
1998	Premante Idera		
1999	Prema Katha	Janaki Ramaiah	
1999	Swayamvaram	Sivaprasad	
1999	Alludugaaru Vachcharu	Shankar Rao	
1999	Vichitram	Haygreevam	
1999	Ravoyi Chandamama	Sujeeth's father	
2000	Nuvve Kavali	Tarun's father	
2000	Bagunnaraa		
2000	Okkadu Chalu		
2000	Adavi Chukka	Simhachalam	
2001	Apparao Ki Oka Nela Thappindi	Mohan Rao	
2001	Family Circus	Krishna Rao	
2001	Simharasi		
2001	Raa		
2001	Akasa Veedhilo	Jagadiswara Rao	
2001	Nuvvu Leka Nenu Lenu	Krishna Rao	
2001	Darling Darling	P.K. Rao	
2001	Snehamante Idera	Aravind's uncle	
2001	Muthyam		
2002	Parasuram		
2002	Neetho Cheppalani		
2002	Okato Number Kurraadu		
2002	Prema Donga		
2002	Allari Ramudu		
2002	Idiot	Inspector	
2002	Holi		
2002	Nee Sneham	Madhav's father	
2003	Pellam Oorelithe		
2003	Vijayam	Usha's father	
2003	Vishnu		
2003	Golmaal		
2003	Fools	Adabala Raja Rao	
2003	Ninne Ishtapaddanu	Charan's father	
2003	Vasantam		
2003	Sambaram	Geeta's father	
2004	Seenu Vasanthi Lakshmi		
2004	Kushikushigaa		
2004	Nenunnanu		
2004	Sri Anjaneyam		
2004	Cheppave Chirugali		
2004	Mr & Mrs Sailaja Krishnamurthy	Krishnamurthy's boss	
2004	Suryam		
2004	Vidyardhi		
2005	Naa Alludu		
2005	Sankranthi		
2005	Andarivaadu		
2005	Super		
2005	Athadu	Poori's father	
2005	Nayakudu		
2006	Happy		
2006	Kithakithalu	Rajababu's father	
2006	Sundaraaniki Tondarekkuva		
2006	Astram		
2006	Game	Rama Chandra Murthy	
2006	Stalin		
2006	Boss - I Love You		
2006	Chinnodu		
2006	Neeku Naaku		
2006	Pellaina Kothalo		
2007	Allare Allari		
2007	Yogi		
2007	Evadaithe Nakenti	Chief Minister	
2007	Madhumasam		
2007	Okkadunnadu	Gautami's father	
2007	Classmates		
2007	Viyyalavari Kayyalu		
2008	Okka Magaadu		
2008	Krishna		
2008	Vaana		
2008	Nee Sukhame Ne Koruthunna		
2008	Gamyam		
2009	Mestri		
2009	Neramu Siksha		
2009	Evaraina Epudaina	Madhumita's father	
2009	Ganesh	Rama Chandra Murthy, Ganesh's father	
2009	Saleem	Singamanaidu's friend	
2010	Bindaas		
2010	Betting Bangaraju		
2010	Subhapradam		
2011	Raaj		
2012	Racha		
2013	Prema Oka Maikam		
2014	Yuddham		
2015	Gaddam Gang	Politician	
2015	Dongaata	Elderly Man in Senior Living Home	
2015	Krishnamma Kalipindi Iddarini	Krishna’s father	
2016	A Aa	Mr. Banerjee	
2017	Lanka	DIG Madhusudhan	
2018	Raa Raa		
2018	Pantham	High Court Judge	
2018	Srinivasa Kalyanam	Vasu's relative	
2018	Geetha Govindam	Geetha's grandfather	
2021	Jathi Ratnalu	Chief Minister	
2021	Sreekaram	Anantharaju	
2021	Most Eligible Bachelor	Judge	
2022	Oke Oka Jeevitham	Watchman	
2023	Anni Manchi Sakunamule	Judge	
