= P. Ravi Shankar filmography =

The following is the filmography of Indian actor, dubbing artist, director and writer P. Ravi Shankar (also known as Sai Ravi). He has dubbed more than 3,500 films.

== Partial filmography ==
=== As actor ===
Year	Title	Role(s)	Language	Notes
1979	Gorintaku		Telugu	Child artist
1980	Challenge Ramudu	Young Raju	Telugu	Child artist
1981	Saptapadi		Telugu	Child artist
1986	Aalochinchandi	Unknown	Telugu	
1991	Madhura Nagarilo		Telugu	
1991	Keechurallu		Telugu	
1991	Jagannatakam	Chakarvathy	Telugu	
1991	Halli Krishna Delhi Radha		Kannada	
1992	Mana Mecchida Sose	Diwakar	Kannada	
1993	Allari Priyudu	Raja's friend	Telugu	
1995	Aadaalla Majaka		Telugu	
2001	Tholi Valapu	Kailash	Telugu	
2002	Malli Malli Chudali	Police Inspector	Telugu	
2002	Vooru Manadiraa		Telugu	
2009	Kurradu	Satya	Telugu	
2009	Vettaikaaran	Chella Vedanayagam	Tamil	
2010	Happy Happy Ga	Suri	Telugu	
2011	Kote	Katari	Kannada	
2011	Kempe Gowda	Armugam	Kannada	also playback singer
2011	Udhayan	Appu	Tamil	
2011	Bodinayakkanur Ganesan	Thiruvaachi	Tamil	credited as Sai Ravi
2011	Dandam Dashagunam	Tamate Shiva	Kannada	
2011	Once Upon a Warrior	Narrator	Telugu	
2012	Kollaikaran	Nagendran	Tamil	
2012	Shakti	Huchche Gowda	Kannada	Nominated, SIIMA Award for Best Actor in a Negative Role
2012	Chaarulatha	Samiyar	Kannada	
2012	Dandupalya	Inspector Chalapathi	Kannada	
2012	Dhamarukam	Andhakasura	Telugu	
2012	Edegarike	Police Inspector J. Nayak	Kannada	
2012	Yaare Koogadali		Kannada	
2013	Aadhi Bhagavan		Tamil	
2013	Varadanayaka	Section Shankar	Kannada	Nominated, SIIMA Award for Best Actor in a Negative Role
2013	Topiwala	Sarkaar	Kannada	
2013	Dilwala	Devaraj	Kannada	
2013	Bachchan	Jayaraj	Kannada	
2013	Ramayya Vasthavayya	Bhikshapathi	Telugu	
2013	Victory	Mafia	Kannada	
2014	Bahaddur	Appaji gowda	Kannada	
2014	Huchudugaru	Maari Gowda	Kannada	
2014	Maanikya	Beera	Kannada	
2014	Adyaksha	Shivarudre Gowda	Kannada	
2015	Shivam	Amanulla Khan	Kannada	
2015	Abhinetri	Betageri Gangaraju	Kannada	
2015	Raja Rajendra	Bottle Mani	Kannada	
2015	Rudra Tandava	Narasimha Reddy	Kannada	
2015	Indru Netru Naalai	Kuzhandaivelu	Tamil	
2015	Aatagara	Inspector Ravi Gowda	Kannada	
2015	RX Soori	Paritala Ravi	Kannada	
2015	Luv U Alia	Zulfi	Kannada	
2015	Plus	Rankasura	Kannada	
2015	Mana Mechida Bangaru		Kannada	
2015	Rathavara	Manikantha	Kannada	
2015	Masterpiece	Boss (Drug Mafia Don)	Kannada	
2016	Kathe Chitrakathe Nirdeshana Puttanna	Boss	Kannada	
2016	Viraat	Surender Singh	Kannada	
2016	Bhale Jodi	Gejje Kesari	Kannada	
2016	Apoorva	Terrorist	Kannada	Guest appearance
2016	Jaggu Dada	Shankar Dada	Kannada	
2016	Jigarthanda	Aarumuga	Kannada	
2016	Kotigobba 2 / Mudinja Ivana Pudi	ACP Kishore	Kannada/Tamil	
2016	Nataraja Service	Baba	Kannada	
2016	Doddmane Hudga	Cable Babu	Kannada	
2016	Mungaru Male 2	Ponnappa	Kannada	
2016	Mukunda Murari	Leeladhara Swamy	Kannada	Nominated – SIIMA Award for Best Actor In A Negative Role
2016	Santhu Straight Forward	Dubai Bhai (Dummy)	Kannada	
2017	Hebbuli	"Arasikere" Anjanappa	Kannada	Nominated - SIIMA Award for Best Actor in a Negative Role - Kannada
2017	Raj Vishnu		Kannada	
2017	Dandupalya 2	Inspector Chalapathi	Kannada	
2017	College Kumar	Shiva Kumar	Kannada	
2017	Anjani Puthra	SP Surya Prakash	Kannada	
2018	Kanaka	Mallikarjuna	Kannada	
2018	Rajaratha	Uncle	Kannada	
2018	Dandupalya 3	Inspector Chalapathi	Kannada	
2018	Bharat Ane Nenu	MLA Damu	Telugu	
2018	Raambo 2	Jocker	Kannada	Nominated - City Cine Award for Best Villain - Kannada
2018	Ayogya	Bacche Gowda	Kannada	Nominated - Filmibeat Award for Best Villain - Kannada; Nominated - City Cine Award for Best Villain - Kannada; Nominated - SIIMA Award for Best Actor in a Negative Role - Kannada
2018	Victory 2	Maamu	Kannada	
2018	Ananthu Vs Nusrath	Gavilingaswamy Kethamaranahalli	Kannada	
2018	Raja Loves Radhe		Kannada	
2018	Silukkuvarupatti Singam	Cycle Shankar	Tamil	
2019	Seetharama Kalyana	Narasimahaiah	Kannada	
2019	Yajamana	Pulla Reddy	Kannada	
2019	Nata Sarvabhouma	Ghanashyam Yadhav	Kannada	
2019	Sinnga	Rudraswamy	Kannada	
2019	Kurukshetra	Shakuni	Kannada	
2019	Bharaate	Pallava	Kannada	
2019	Odeya	Narasimha	Kannada	
2020	Utraan		Tamil	
2021	Krack	Konda Reddy	Telugu	
2021	Pogaru	M. Ramakrishna	Kannada	
2021	Roberrt	Sarkar	Kannada	
2021	Kotigobba 3	Kishore	Kannada	
2022	Abbara	Vairamudi	Kannada	
2022	Aadavallu Meeku Johaarlu	Sai Krishna	Telugu	
2022	Mukhachitram	Lawyer Vasishta	Telugu	
2022	Kaaneyaadavara Bagge Prakatane	Krishnamurthy	Kannada	
2022	Thaggedele	Chellapa	Telugu	
2022	Triple Riding	Annaiah	Kannada	
2023	Kranti	Narasappa	Kannada	
2023	Pentagon		Kannada	Anthology film; segment Doni Saagali Munde Hogali
2023	Veera Simha Reddy	Home Minister	Telugu	Also dubbed for Duniya Vijay
2023	Bhola Shankar	Local goon	Telugu	
2023	Bhagavanth Kesari	Umesh Dutt's friend	Telugu	
2023	Garadi	Shivappa Rane	Kannada	
2024	Guntur Kaaram	Kata Madhu	Telugu	
2024	Bhaje Vaayu Vegam	David	Telugu	
2024	Ooru Peru Bhairavakona	Rajappa	Telugu	
2024	Karataka Damanaka	Jagga	Kannada	
2024	Not Out	Ontikoppal Devaraj	Kannada	
2024	Ronny	Kaali	Kannada	
2024	Bhairadevi	Aghori	Kannada	
2025	Jaat	Central Minister	Hindi	
2025	Raju James Bond	MLA Bhootayya	Kannada	
2026	Surya: The Power of Love	Maari	Kannada	
2026	Ayogya 2	Bacche Gowda	Kannada	

=== As dubbing artist ===
Year	Title	Voiced for	Language	Notes
1990	Rowdyism Nasinchali	Mohan Raj	Telugu	
1991	Chaitanya	Raghuvaran	Telugu	
1991	Vaidehi Vandhachu	Charan Raj	Tamil	
1992	Antham	Salim Ghouse	Telugu	
1992	Lathi	Raghuvaran	Telugu	
1993	I Love India	Babu Antony	Tamil	
1994	Commissioner	Suresh Gopi	Tamil	
1994	The Lion King	Jeremy Irons	Telugu	For the character Scar
1994	Thendral Varum Theru	Rizabawa	Tamil	
1994	Honest Raj	Devan	Tamil	
1994	Sabhash Ramu	Venkatesh	Tamil	
1994	Anbalayam	Mohnish Behl	Tamil	
1995	Mounam	Raghuvaran	Telugu	
1995	Chutti Kuzhandhai	Nagarjuna	Tamil	
1995	The King	Devan	Tamil	also for Telugu version
1995	Jurassic Park	Jeff Goldblum	Tamil	dubbed versions
1995	Jurassic Park	Jeff Goldblum	Telugu	dubbed versions
1995	Baasha	Devan	Tamil	
1995	Baasha	Charan Raj	Tamil	
1995	Ragasiya Police	Devan	Tamil	
1995	Rangeela	Jackie Shroff	Tamil	Dubbed version
1996	Amalapuram Alludu	Vijay	Telugu	Dubbed version
1996	Pudhu Nilavu	Kazan Khan	Tamil	
1996	Sivasakthi	Mahesh Anand	Tamil	
1996	Deyyam	Ajinkya Deo	Telugu	
1996	Delhi Diary	Suresh Gopi	Tamil	
1996	Kalloori Vaasal	Kalyan	Tamil	
1996	Jagadeka Veerudu	Mahesh Anand	Telugu	
1996	Police Story	Sathyaprakash	Telugu	Dubbed from Kannada film of same name
1997	Lelam	Charan Raj	Malayalam	Dubbed for Suresh Gopi in Tamil version
1997	Ugadi	Sharat Saxena	Telugu	
1997	Hitler	Prakash Raj	Telugu	
1998	Suswagatham	Raghuvaran	Telugu	
1998	Aahaa..!	Raghuvaran	Telugu	
1998	Bavagaru Bagunnara?	Paresh Rawal	Telugu	
1998	Vaettiya Madichu Kattu	Sathyaprakash	Tamil	
1998	Golmaal	Sathyaprakash	Tamil	
1998	Bobbili Vamsham	Raj Kapoor	Telugu	
1999	Adutha Kattam	Raja Ravindra	Tamil	
1999	Sneham Kosam	Prakash Rai	Telugu	
1999	Narasimha	Prakash Raj	Telugu	Dubbed version
1999	Anaganaga Oka Ammai	Raghuvaran	Telugu	
1999	Prema Katha	Manoj Bajpai	Telugu	Nandi Award for Best Male Dubbing Artist
1999	Oke Okkadu	Raghuvaran	Telugu	
1999	Devi	Abu Salim	Telugu	also for Tamil version
1999	Adutha Kattam	Raja Ravindra	Tamil	
1999	Pathram	Suresh Gopi	Tamil	
1999	Crime File	Suresh Gopi	Tamil	
1999	Sathriya Dharmam	Nandamuri Harikrishna	Tamil	Dubbed version
1999	Government	Napoleon	Kannada	
1999	Premanuragam	Mohnish Behl	Telugu	Dubbed version
2000	Prema Gharshana	Arjun Sarja	Telugu	Dubbed version
2000	Periya Gounder	Mammootty	Tamil	
2000	Pelli Sambandham	Raghuvaran	Telugu	
2000	Independence Day	Arun Pandiyan	Tamil	
2000	Vallarasu	Mukesh Rishi	Tamil	
2000	Azad	Raghuvaran	Telugu	
2001	Badri	Bhupinder Singh	Tamil	
2001	Sri Manjunatha	Arjun Sarja	Telugu	
2001	Narasimha	Rahul Dev	Tamil	
2001	Commissioner Eeswara Pandiyan	Mammootty	Tamil	also dialogue writer for Tamil version
2001	Dhill	Ashish Vidyarthi	Tamil	Tamil Nadu State Film Award for Best Male Dubbing Artist
2001	Hello Mama	Nagarjuna	Tamil	also dialogue writer for Tamil version
2001	Kushi	Nassar	Telugu	
2001	Moothavan	Chiranjeevi	Tamil	
2001	Kotigobba	Ashish Vidyarthi	Kannada	
2002	Seema Simham	Raghuvaran	Telugu	
2002	Parva	Radha Ravi	Kannada	
2002	Santhosha Vaanile	Nagarjuna	Tamil	
2002	Bobby	Raghuvaran	Telugu	
2002	Sreeram	Ashish Vidyarthi	Telugu	
2002	Indra	Mukesh Rishi	Telugu	Nandi Award for Best Male Dubbing Artist; also dubbed for Chiranjeevi in its Tamil dubbed version Indhiran
2002	Bagavathi	Ashish Vidyarthi	Tamil	
2002	H2O Kaveri	Upendra	Tamil	Tamil version only
2002	Kadhal Azhivathillai	Prakash Raj	Tamil	Dubbed for Prakash Raj in Telugu dubbed version (Kurradochadu)
2002	Thamizhan	Ashish Vidyarthi	Tamil	
2002	Baba	Ashish Vidyarthi	Tamil	Dubbed for Ashish Vidyarthi in Telugu dubbed version
2002	Baba	Sayaji Shinde	Tamil	Dubbed for Ashish Vidyarthi in Telugu dubbed version
2002	Ezhumalai	Ashish Vidyarthi	Tamil	
2002	Samasthanam	Ashish Vidyarthi	Tamil	
2002	CID Moosa	Ashish Vidyarthi	Malayalam	for his Tamil Voice as he is a Tamilian in this film
2003	Dhool	Manoj K. Jayan	Tamil	
2003	Dhool	Sayaji Shinde	Tamil	
2003	Ramachandra	Ashish Vidyarthi	Tamil	
2003	Villain	Vijayan	Telugu	
2003	Naaga	Raghuvaran	Telugu	
2003	Johnny	Raghuvaran	Telugu	
2003	Dum	Ashish Vidyarthi	Tamil	
2003	Palanati Brahmanaidu	Mukesh Rishi	Telugu	
2003	12 Va Anthasthu	Nana Patekar	Telugu	Dubbed version
2003	Simhadri	Nassar	Telugu	
2003	Simhadri	Mukesh Rishi	Telugu	
2003	Veede	Manoj K. Jayan	Telugu	
2003	Veede	Sayaji Shinde	Telugu	
2004	Shankar Dada MBBS	Paresh Rawal	Telugu	
2004	Shankar Dada MBBS	Bhupinder Singh	Telugu	
2004	Yuva	Suriya	Telugu	Dubbed version
2004	Gowri	Atul Kulkarni	Telugu	
2004	Naani	Raghuvaran	Telugu	
2004	Gudumba Shankar	Ashish Vidyarthi	Telugu	
2004	Venky	Ashutosh Rana	Telugu	
2004	Yagnam	Devaraj	Telugu	
2004	Aai	Ashish Vidyarthi	Tamil	
2004	Aai	Vincent Asokan	Tamil	
2004	Sye	Pradeep Rawat	Telugu	Nandi Award for Best Male Dubbing Artist
2004	Sye	Nassar	Telugu	Nandi Award for Best Male Dubbing Artist
2004	Ghilli	Ashish Vidyarthi	Tamil	
2004	Durgi	Kalabhavan Mani	Kannada	
2004	Durgi	Ashish Vidyarthi	Kannada	
2005	Naa Alludu	Charan Raj	Telugu	
2005	No	Ashish Vidyarthi	Telugu	
2005	Nammanna	Subbaraju	Kannada	
2005	Nayakudu	Nassar	Telugu	
2005	Chatrapathi	Pradeep Rawat	Telugu	
2005	Chatrapathi	Narendra Jha	Telugu	
2005	Athanokkade	Ashish Vidyarthi	Telugu	
2005	Jai Chiranjeeva	Arbaaz Khan	Telugu	
2005	Narasimhudu	Ashish Vidyarthi	Telugu	
2005	Narasimhudu	Puneet Issar	Telugu	
2005	Narasimhudu	Rahul Dev	Telugu	
2005	Chandramukhi	Avinash	Telugu	Dubbed version
2005	Kochi Rajavu	Sudheer Sukumaran	Malayalam	
2005	Aaru	Ashish Vidyarthi	Telugu	
2005	Athadu	Sonu Sood	Telugu	
2005	Athadu	Charan Raj	Telugu	
2005	Athadu	Rahul Dev	Telugu	
2005	Gowtam SSC	Nassar	Telugu	
2005	Sri	Devaraj	Telugu	
2005	Ghajini	Pradeep Rawat	Tamil	
2006	Ranam	Biju Menon	Telugu	
2006	Asadhyudu	Ravi Kale	Telugu	
2006	Pokiri	Nassar	Telugu	Nandi Award for Best Male Dubbing Artist
2006	Pokiri	Ashish Vidyarthi	Telugu	Nandi Award for Best Male Dubbing Artist
2006	Chess	Ashish Vidyarthi	Malayalam	
2006	Happy	Manoj Bajpayee	Telugu	
2006	Himsinche Raju 23rd Pulikesi	Nassar	Telugu	dubbed version
2006	E	Ashish Vidyarthi	Tamil	
2006	Sabari	Pradeep Rawat	Tamil	
2006	Vathiyar	Pradeep Rawat	Tamil	
2006	Sudesi	Sayaji Shinde	Tamil	
2006	Annavaram	Ashish Vidyarthi	Telugu	
2006	Annavaram	Lal	Telugu	
2006	Vikramarkudu	Vineet Kumar	Telugu	
2006	Vikramarkudu	Ajay	Telugu	
2007	Athidhi	Murali Sharma	Telugu	Nandi Award for Best Male Dubbing Artist
2007	Athidhi	Ashish Vidyarthi	Telugu	Nandi Award for Best Male Dubbing Artist
2007	Pokkiri	Mukesh Tiwari	Tamil	
2007	Manikanda	Ashish Vidyarthi	Tamil	
2007	Police Ante Veedera	Sarath Kumar	Telugu	Dubbed version
2007	Police Ante Veedera	Prakash Raj	Telugu	Dubbed version
2007	Azhagiya Tamil Magan	Ashish Vidyarthi	Tamil	
2007	Azhagiya Tamil Magan	Sayaji Shinde	Tamil	
2007	Dada	Suresh Gopi	Telugu	Dubbed version
2007	Evadaithe Nakenti	Raghuvaran	Telugu	
2007	Periyar	Sathyaraj	Telugu	Dubbed version
2007	Athisayan	Jackie Shroff	Malayalam	
2007	Police Story 2	Shobhraj	Telugu	Dubbed version
2007	Munna	Rahul Dev	Telugu	
2007	Munna	Sridhar Rao	Telugu	
2007	Singamalai	Raghuvaran	Telugu	Dubbed version
2007	Sivaji: The Boss	Raghuvaran	Telugu	Dubbed Version
2007	Lakshyam	Yashpal Sharma	Telugu	
2007	Lakshyam	Ashish Vidyarthi	Telugu	
2008	Okka Magadu	Ashutosh Rana	Telugu	
2008	Bheemaa	Ashish Vidyarthi	Tamil	
2008	Ontari	Ashish Vidyarthi	Telugu	
2008	Aatadista	Raghuvaran	Telugu	
2008	Ghatothkach	Samay	Tamil	For the character Duryodhan
2008	Jalsa	Mukesh Rishi	Telugu	
2008	Nayagan	J. K. Rithesh	Tamil	
2008	The Dark Knight	Heath Ledger	Telugu	Dubbed version.
2008	Muni	Rajkiran	Telugu	Dubbed version
2008	Vaitheeswaran	Sayaji Shinde	Tamil	
2008	Bhayya	Ashish Vidyarthi	Telugu	Dubbed version
2008	Santhosh Subramaniam	Sayaji Shinde	Tamil	
2008	Kuruvi	Ashish Vidyarthi	Tamil	
2008	Sathyam / Salute	Upendra	Tamil / Telugu	
2008	Thenavattu	Saikumar Pudipeddi	Tamil	
2008	Bommayi	Sudeep	Tamil	dialogue writer for Tamil version
2008	Krishna	Mukul Dev	Telugu	
2009	Villu	Devaraj	Tamil	
2009	Arundhati	Sonu Sood	Telugu / Tamil	Nandi /Tamil Nadu State Film Award for Best Male Dubbing Artist; Dialogue writer for Tamil Dubbed version; Dubbed in both Telugu and Tamil
2009	Kick	Shaam	Telugu	
2009	Engal Aasan	Ramki Shetty	Tamil	
2009	Bank	Raghuvaran	Tamil	
2009	Naalai Namadhe	Ashish Vidyarthi	Tamil	
2009	Kanthaswamy	Ashish Vidyarthi	Tamil	
2009	Jayeebhava	Mukesh Rishi	Telugu	
2009	Jayeebhava	Ashish Vidyarthi	Telugu	
2009	Anjaneyulu	Sonu Sood	Telugu	Nandi Award for Best Male Dubbing Artist
2009	Anjaneyulu	Nassar	Telugu	Nandi Award for Best Male Dubbing Artist
2009	Billa	Rahman	Telugu	
2009	Billa	Supreeth	Telugu	
2009	Magadheera	Dev Gill	Telugu	
2009	Arya 2	Mukesh Rishi	Telugu	
2009	Drona	Mukesh Rishi	Telugu	
2010	Golimaar	Kelly Dorjee	Telugu	
2010	Golimaar	Nassar	Telugu	
2010	Varudu	Arya	Telugu	
2010	Kalyanram Kathi	Shaam	Telugu	
2010	Nagavalli	Avinash	Telugu	
2010	Rama Rama Krishna Krishna	Nassar	Telugu	
2010	Rama Rama Krishna Krishna	Vineet Kumar	Telugu	
2010	Komaram Puli	Manoj Bajpai	Telugu	
2010	Adhurs	Ashish Vidyarthi	Telugu	
2010	Adhurs	Mahesh Manjrekar	Telugu	
2010	Adhurs	Nassar	Telugu	
2011	Oosaravelli	Shaam	Telugu	
2011	Oosaravelli	Adhvik Mahajan	Telugu	
2011	Siruthai	Avinash	Tamil	Tamil Nadu State Film Award for Best Male Dubbing Artist
2011	Veera	Shaam	Telugu	
2011	Veera	Pradeep Rawat	Telugu	
2011	Aaranya Kaandam	Jackie Shroff	Tamil	
2011	Markandeyan	Srihari	Tamil	
2011	Prema Kavali	Dev Gill	Telugu	
2011	Muni 2: Kanchana	Sarath Kumar	Telugu	Dubbed version
2011	Kandireega	Sonu Sood	Telugu	
2011	Osthe	Sonu Sood	Tamil	
2011	Only Vishnuvardhana	Sonu Sood	Kannada	
2012	Snehitudu	Sathyaraj	Telugu	Dubbed version
2012	Gabbar Singh	Abhimanyu Singh	Telugu	
2012	Julayi	Sonu Sood	Telugu	Nandi Award for Best Male Dubbing Artist
2012	Kalpana	Upendra	Telugu	
2012	Kalpana	Saikumar Pudipeddi	Telugu	
2013	Naayak	Ashish Vidyarthi	Telugu	
2013	Naayak	Pradeep Rawat	Telugu	
2013	Mirchi	Sathyaraj	Telugu	
2013	Baadshah	Ashish Vidyarthi	Telugu	
2013	Sevakudu	Nasser	Telugu	
2013	NH4	Kay Kay Menon	Telugu	Dubbed version
2013	Tadakha	Ashutosh Rana	Telugu	
2013	Balupu	Ashutosh Rana	Telugu	
2013	Attarintiki Daredi	Boman Irani & Mukesh Rishi	Telugu	
2014	Yevadu	Rahul Dev	Telugu	also for Tamil dubbed version under the title Magadheera
2014	Race Gurram	Shaam	Telugu	
2014	Race Gurram	Ravi Kishan	Telugu	
2014	Race Gurram	Mukesh Rishi	Telugu	
2014	Aagadu	Ashish Vidyarthi	Telugu	
2014	Aagadu	Sonu Sood	Telugu	
2015	Gopala Gopala	Mithun Chakraborty	Telugu	
2015	Pataas	Ashutosh Rana	Telugu	
2015	Jil	Kabir Duhan Singh	Telugu	
2015	S/O Satyamurthy	Upendra	Telugu	
2015	Baahubali: The Beginning	Sathyaraj	Telugu	
2015	Kick 2	Ravi Kishan	Telugu	
2015	Kick 2	Sanjay Mishra	Telugu	
2015	Kick 2	Shaam	Telugu	
2015	Shivam	Abhimanyu Singh	Telugu	
2015	Bengal Tiger	Boman Irani	Telugu	
2015	Maga Maharaju	Pradeep Rawat	Telugu (dubbed)	
2016	Janatha Garage	Ashish Vidyarthi	Telugu	
2016	Sarrainodu	Pradeep Rawat	Telugu	
2017	Motta Shiva Ketta Shiva	Ashutosh Rana	Tamil	
2017	Baahubali 2: The Conclusion	Sathyaraj	Telugu	
2017	Spyder	S. J. Surya	Telugu	Only for Telugu version
2017	Adhirindhi	S. J. Surya	Telugu	Dubbed version
2018	Agnyaathavaasi	Boman Irani	Telugu	
2018	Bhaagmati	Jayaram	Telugu	
2018	Vyuham	Sujith Shankar	Telugu	For the character C.I Simon George in the Dubbed Version; (D)-Released in 2020
2018	2.0	Akshay Kumar	Telugu	Dubbed Version
2019	Jersey	Sathyaraj	Telugu	
2019	The Lion King	James Earl Jones	Tamil	For the character Mufasa
2019	The Lion King	James Earl Jones	Telugu	For the character Mufasa
2019	Prati Roju Pandage	Sathyaraj	Telugu	
2021	Krack	Samuthirakani	Telugu	
2021	Alludu Adhurs	Sonu Sood	Telugu	
2021	Uppena	Vijay Sethupathi	Telugu	
2022	Acharya	Sonu Sood	Telugu	
2022	Sarkaru Vaari Paata	Samuthirakani	Telugu	
2022	Pakka Commercial	Sathyaraj	Telugu	
2023	Veera Simha Reddy	Duniya Vijay	Telugu	
2023	Adipurush	Saif Ali Khan	Telugu	Dubbed in Telugu, Tamil, Kannada
2023	Leo	Sanjay Dutt	Tamil	Also for Telugu version
2024	Guntur Kaaram	Jayaram	Telugu	Also for Tamil version
2024	Devara: Part 1	Saif Ali Khan	Telugu	Also for Tamil version
2025	Daaku Maharaaj	Bobby Deol	Telugu	
2025	Daaku Maharaaj	Ravi Kishan	Telugu	
2025	Good Bad Ugly	Sunil	Tamil	
2025	Hari Hara Veera Mallu	Dalip Tahil	Telugu	
2026	The RajaSaab	Sanjay Dutt	Telugu	
2026	The Paradise	Sathyaraj	Telugu	

=== As director ===
Year	Title	Language	Notes
2004	Durgi	Kannada	
2025	Subrahmanyam	Telugu/Kannada	

=== As playback singer ===
Year	Album	Song	Language	Notes
2003	Santhosha Vaanile	"Enuyire Enuyire"	Tamil	
2006	Mohini 9886788888	"Just Say Hai"	Kannada	
2010	Rakta Charitra – I	"Thudilenidhi"	Telugu	
2010	Rakta Charitra – II	"Kondani Dee"	Telugu	
2010	Raththa Sarithiram	"Manidham Yendra"	Tamil	
2011	Kempe Gowda	"Shankara"	Kannada	
2012	Bejawada	"Aigiri Nandini"	Telugu	
2013	Varadanayaka	"Theme"	Kannada	
2016	Jigarthanda	"Kai Ethi Thatdha"	Kannada	
2016	Santhu Straight Forward	"Self Made Shehzaada"	Kannada	
2016	Vangaveeti	"Aigiri Nandini"	Telugu	
2018	Rajaratha; Rajaratham	"Gandaka" "Chal Chal Gurram"	Kannada; Telugu	

=== As dialogue writer ===
Year	Title	Language	Notes
2006	Kumaran	Tamil	
