= Nandi Awards of 2000 =

Indian Telugu film and TV awards ceremony

== 2000 Nandi Awards Winners List ==
Category	Winner	Film
Best Feature Film	Chiru Navvutho	Chiru Navvutho
Second Best Feature Film	Azad	Azad
Third Best Feature Film	Manoharam	Manoharam
Best Actor	Jagapathi Babu	Manoharam
Best Actress	Laya	Manoharam
Best Director	S. V. Krishna Reddy	Saparivara sakutumba sametamga
Best Story Writer	Tirupati Swamy	Azad
Best Supporting Actor	Kota Srinivasa Rao	Pruthvi Narayana
Best Supporting Actress	Jhansi	Jayam Manade Raa
Best Character Actor	Prakash Raj	Azad
Nandi Award for Best Character Actress	Jaya Sudha	Yuvakudu
Best Child Actor	Master Subhakar	Hindustan - the mother
Best Child Actress	Baby Zeeba	Hindustan - the mother
Best Cinematographer	Ashok Kumar	Sri Sai Mahima
Best Screenplay Writer	G Ram Prasad	Chiru Navvutho
Best Dialogue Writer	Trivikram Srinivas	Chiru Navvutho
Best Lyricist	Vennelakanti	Raghavayyagari Abbai (Rudhabhoomi Yuddabhoomi)
Best Male Playback Singer	S. P. Balasubrahmanyam	Raghavayyagari Abbai
Best Female Playback Singer	S. Janaki	Sri Sai Mahima
Best Music Director	Vandemataram Srinivas	Devullu
Best Art Director	Gangadhar	Sri Sai Mahima
Best First Film of a Director	G Ram Prasad	Chiru Navvutho
Best Audiographer	Madhusudhana Reddy	Vijayaramaraju
Best Editor	Srikar Prasadr	Manoharam
Best Male Comedian	L.B. Sriram; M. S. Narayana	Chala Bagundi; Sardukupodam Randi
Best Female Comedian	Kovai Sarala	Rayalaseema Ramanna Chowdary
Best Villain	Jaya Prakash Reddy	Jayam Manadera
Best Choreographer	Tara	Chala Bagundi
Best Costume Designer	Giri	Sri Sai Mahima
Best Makeup Artist	A Sekhar Babu	Hindustan - the mother
Best Film Critic on Telugu Cinema	Bhageeratha	
Best Fight Master	Kanal Kannan	Azad
Best Male Dubbing Artist	S. P. Balasubrahmanyam	Sri Sai Mahima
Best Female Dubbing Artist	Silpa	Vijayaramaraju
Special Jury Award	Yuvakudu	Yuvakudu
Special Jury Award	Sri Hari	Vijayaramaraju
Special Jury Award	AVS	Uncle
Sarojini Devi Award for a Film on National Integration	Hindustan - the mother	Hindustan - the mother
Best Documentary Film	Hyderabad Punarnirmanam	Hyderabad Punarnirmanam
Second Best Documentary Film	Rakshakudu	Rakshakudu
Nandi Award for Best Educational Film	Madhura Kshanalu	Madhura Kshanalu
