= M. S. Narayana =

Indian actor (1951–2015)

- Born: Mallavarapu Surya Narayana; 16 April 1951; Nidamarru, Madras State, (present-day Andhra Pradesh) India
- Died: 23 January 2015 (aged 63); Hyderabad, Telangana, India
- Occupations: Writer; actor; director; comedian
- Years active: 1992–2015
- Works: Full list
- Awards: Full list

M. S. Narayana (16 April 1951 – 23 January 2015) was an Indian actor and comedian, who worked predominantly in Telugu cinema. Narayana worked in over 750 films in his career spanning 23 years. He died on 23 January 2015 due to organ failure in Hyderabad, India.

== Career ==
Narayana dabbled in theatre initially while working as a lecturer at KGRL College, Bhimavaram, and entered the film industry as a writer before being introduced as an actor. He made his debut as a writer in the film Alexander starring his son Vikram. Another film directed by him was Bhajantrilu. He penned dialogues for eight films.

Narayana's debut film as an actor was M. Dharmaraju M.A. which was released in 1994. M. S. Narayana, initially a writer, contributed to comedy track in the film. Director Ravi Raja Pinisetty, seeking an actor with a distinct appearance described as "Dosakai Mokham" (cucumber face), cast Narayana, who was then working as a writer, after an assistant suggested his name. Although hesitant to act, Narayana accepted the role following Pinisetty's encouragement.

Narayana became very popular for his comedian roles in Telugu cinema. He started his career in 1997, at the age of 46. Since then, he has acted in over 700 films in a short period of just 17 years. His friends appealed to the Guinness Records Academy to recognise him.

== Personal life ==
His son, Vikram, is an actor, while his daughter Sasi Kiran is a director.

== Awards and nominations ==
List of M. S. Narayana awards and nominations
Award	Year	Category	Film	Result	Ref.
Nandi Awards	1997	Best Male Comedian	Maa Nannaku Pelli	Won	
Nandi Awards	1999	Best Male Comedian	Ramasakkanodu	Won	
Nandi Awards	2000	Best Male Comedian	Sardukupodaam Randi (Note: Shared with L. B. Sriram for Chala Bagundi)	Won	
Nandi Awards	2003	Best Male Comedian	Sivamani	Won	
Nandi Awards	2011	Best Male Comedian	Dookudu	Won	
Filmfare Awards South	2012	Best Supporting Actor – Telugu	Dookudu	Won	
CineMAA Awards	2012	Special Jury – Best Comedian	Dookudu	Won	
