= Rajshri Ponnappa =

Indian actress

Rajshri
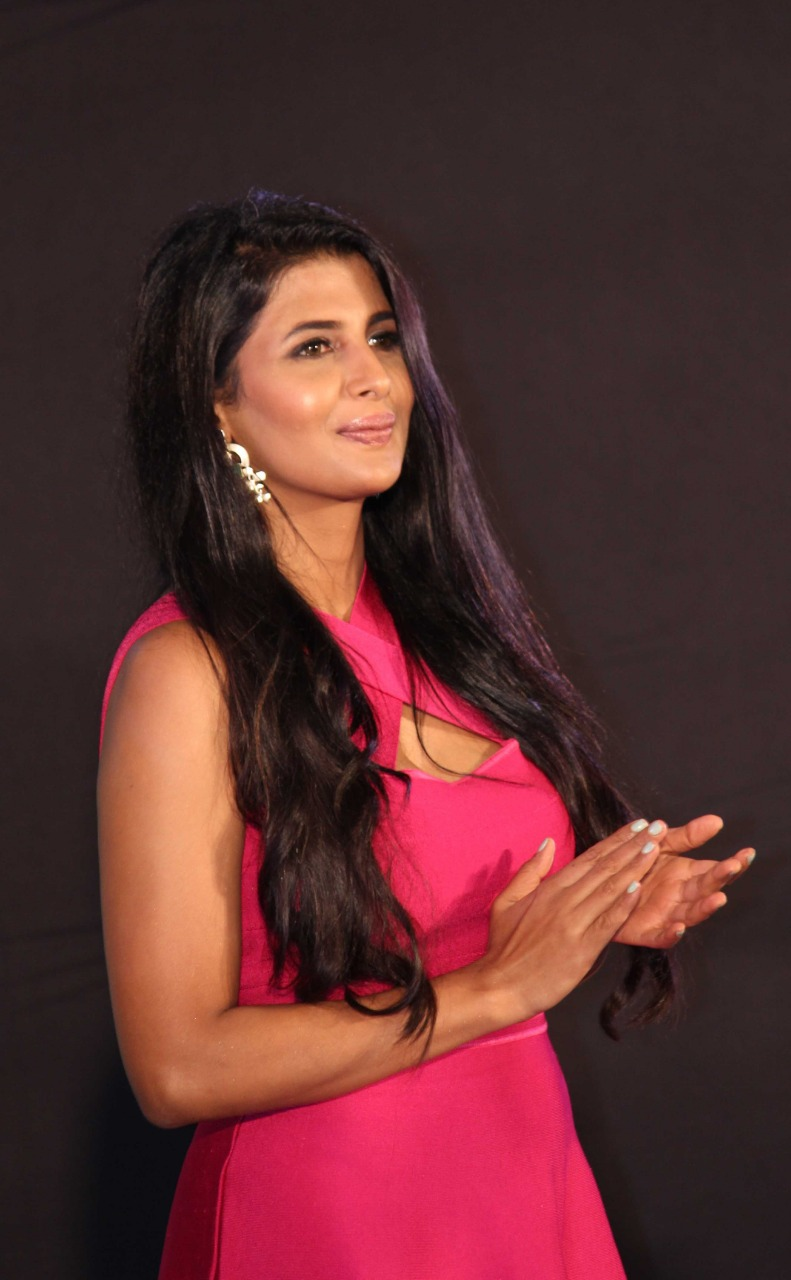
- Rajshri Ponnappa at the Miss Fabb 2018
- Born: Rajshri Ponnappa
- Occupations: Actress; Model
- Years active: 2013 - present

Rajshri Ponnappa is an Indian actress who has predominantly appeared in Kannada-language films. She made her Malayalam Cinema debut in, Aquarium in 2013. She gained acclaim for being the only South Indian actress to be featured on Outlook Magazine's cover. In addition to acting in movies, Rajshri has launched her own production house to produce regional cinema and has won acclaim as a theatre actress.

== Early life ==
Rajshri was born in Coorg, Karnataka to MM Ponnappa, businessman, and Jyothi MP, . She is a trained Bharatnatyam dancer. The eldest of three children, Rajshri has a younger brother and sister who are twins.

She completed her schooling from Clarence High School, JP Nagar, Bangalore and went on to study in Jyoti Nivas College, Bangalore completing her graduation in Bachelors of Mass Communication. During her time in college, she was an all-rounder. She also completed her honors programme in Human Resource Management from St. Joseph's College, Bangalore.

It was during this time that she started doing voice-overs for Radio Mirchi and was also an outdoor broadcasting radio-jockey for Radio One. As a college student, she studied film-making and participated in the making of 3 documentaries, out of which one was made on traffic awareness and was screened by the Chennai city traffic police.

== Career ==
She rose to prominence when she became the face of Zee Kannada after winning multiple reality TV shows and soon after, she was offered her first movie Pithavinum Puthranam Parishudhatmvinum. The film did not release due to religious conflicts but earned her enough fame and popularity to be featured on the cover page of Outlook National Magazine, after which she was offered various films.

She made an impact with a pivotal role in film Vasundhara which was directed by National Award Winner T. S. Nagabharana.This was followed by a role in Rocket with Sathish Ninasam and Achyuth Kumar. She made her Telugu Film debut with Srikanth in Mental Police and won audience acclaim. In 2017, she acted alongside B. C. Patil, Saikumar, Vijaya Raghavendra, Diganth, Dhananjay, Sudharani, Shruthi Hariharan, Sonu Gowda, Margarita and Srushti Patil in Kannada anthology drama – Happy New Year which was directed by Pannaga Bharana. While working with T.S. Nagabharana, Rajshri was introduced to Theatre and soon after, shifted to Mumbai to pursue it. She made her theatre debut with Surnai Theatre and Folk Arts Foundation's Namaste which is an adaptation by Ila Arun of Tom Dudzick's popular play GREETINGS! (1990) and is directed by K.K. Raina. The play has been received well by audiences and has been performed in multiple cities across India including Shimla, Delhi, Jaipur, Hyderabad and the iconic Prithvi Theatre in Mumbai.

She has appeared in advertisements for leading brands such as Kalyan Jewellers (with Shiva RajKumar), Nature's Basket and Lipton Tea. She has also co-produced Namo Bhootatma, a Kannada horror comedy film directed by Murali, it is a remake of the 2014 Tamil film Yaamirukka Bayamey (which itself was based on the Korean movie The Quiet Family). She made her Tamil debut in Samuthirakani's Adutha Saattai, further expanding her presence in the South Indian film industry.

== Philanthropy ==
She participated in the Vanity Trunk Sale, Bangalore along with Kavya Shetty, Manvitha Harish, Meghna Gaonkar, Meghana Raj, Neethu Shetty and other actresses from the South film industry – a cause which had them donating clothes and accessories from their personal wardrobe. The proceeds of which went to her mother's charitable organization JP Foundation and Aadya Foundation.

== Filmography ==
Year	Film	Role	Language	Notes
2014	Vasundhara		Kannada	
2015	Rocket		Kannada	
2016	Mental Police		Kannada	
2017	Happy New Year	Disha	Kannada	
2019	Adutha Saattai	Pachaiammal	Tamil	
2022	Abbara	Vaishali	Kannada	
2022	Aquarium	Jaseentha	Malayalam	Released after 10 years
