= Ramadhanya =

Indian Kannada-language autobiographical film

- Theatrical release poster
- Directed by: T. N. Nagesh
- Written by: Basavaraj Suleripalya
- Produced by: Venkatesh Savanura; Jambanna B Havalada; Santhosh Angadi; Anilkumar Pavali; Govindaraju R Mallesh Rajagandharva; S N Rajashekar Budal; Mahanthesha G Thavamshi
- Starring: Yashas Surya; Nimika Ratnakar
- Music by: Desi Mohan
- Production companies: Sri Lakshminarasimha Movies; Dashamukha Ventures
- Release date: 25 May 2018
- Country: India
- Language: Kannada

Ramadhanya is a 2018 Indian Kannada-language autobiographical film directed by T. N. Nagesh and starring Yashas Surya and Nimika Ratnakar.

== Cast ==
- Yashas Surya in a triple role:
  - Raghav
  - Kanaka Dasa
  - Rama
- Nimika Ratnakar in a triple role:
  - Surabhi
  - Vaduta
  - Sita
- Mandya Ramesh as Dodda Dasayya
- Venkatchala as Sanna Dasayya
- Ramesh Pandit as Hanumappa
- Ganesh Rao Kesarkar as Venkatagiri
- Shivaram as temple priest
- Shringeri Ramamna as Gautama Muni
- Ram Ram as Thathacharya
- Krishna Adiga as Shrinivasacharya
- Suresh Rai as Shri Krishnadevaraya
- Vasudeva Rao as Thimmarasa
- Ramaswamy as Gangappa
- Aruna Balraj as Gangamma
- Sapna Raj as Bachchamma
- Rajashekhar Boodala as Beerappa
- Yash Ninasam as Bhatta
- Venu Raj as Ragi
- Devaraj Roopantara as Narada
- Kuladeepa Muragod as Lakshmana
- Nagaraj Poojari as Anjaneya
- Ujwaj Roopantara as Sugreeva
- Raju Roopantara as Sage Pipila
- Nanjundaswamy as Maharshi
- Santhosh Angadi as Commander-In-Chief
- Rajat as Shree Krishna
- Sandeep as Mauni Baba
- Gururaj Rao as Vyasatheertha
- K. Pradeep Vathaara as Purandara Dasa
- Girisha Raj Roopantara as Bharatha
- Venkatesh Kadamba as Shatrughna
- Roopesh Kumara as Adil Shah

== Production ==
To portray Kanaka Dasa, Yashas Surya watched Bhakta Kanakadasa (1960) and trained for the role.

== Reception ==
Sunayana Suresh of The Times of India rated the film 2.5/5 and wrote, "Raama Dhanya is not your everyday glossy masala flick, but it can be watched once for its message if you pardon a few shortcomings through the course of the story". Shashiprasad S. M. of the Deccan Chronicle wrote, "Most of what the movie intends to serve the audience is well documented, and there is nothing new which is another negative. However, it could be an educating picture for those who are unaware of the saint's work and his greater message to the society".
