= Nimika Ratnakar =

Indian Kannada film actress

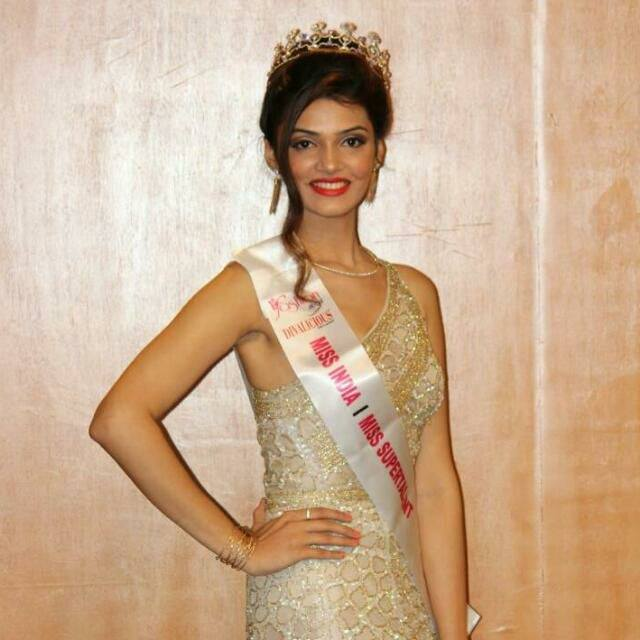
- Ratnakar in 2017
- Born: Mangalore, Karnataka, India
- Occupations: Actress, Model
- Notable work: Mr. Bachelor, Trishulam
- Spouse: Ashish Rajdhyan (m. 2026)

Nimika Ratnakar is an Indian model and actress primarily works in the Kannada Films. She is known for the films like Mr. Bachelor and Kranti.

As a beauty pageant she represented India at the Miss Supertalent of the World 2017 held in Seoul, South Korea.

== Background ==
She was born in Mangalore. She did her schooling from St. Agnes School and E&C Engineering from MITE in Moodbidri

== Career ==
Nimika started her film career as a playback singer and sung for Tulu films including Madipu. Nimika Ratnakar debuted in 2018 with the Kannada film Raama Dhanya, which didn't do well in the box office.

In 2022, Nimika worked in the movies Abbara and The Fighter Suman. Nimika came into limelight in 2023 when she worked in the film Kranti, starring Darshan. She got popularity for the song 'Pushpavati'.

In 2023, she has also worked in the films like the unreleased Trishulam, Mr. Bachelor, and Kranti.

== Filmography ==
- Note: all films are in Kannada, unless otherwise noted.

Year	Film	Role	Notes
2018	Ramadhanya	Surabhi, Vaduta, Sita	Triple role
2022	Abbara	Sonu	
2023	Mr. Bachelor	Pallavi	
2023	Kranti		Special appearance in the song "Pushpavati"
2023	The Fighter Suman	Pooja	Hindi dubbed release
2025	Flirt	Saniha	
TBA	Phoenix †		Fliming
TBA	Guerrilla War †		Announced
