= Yuga Yugagale Saagali =

2008 Indian film

- Official poster
- Directed by: Shashank Raj
- Starring: Yashas Surya; Megha Ghosh
- Cinematography: Nageshwara Rao
- Music by: Hamsalekha
- Release date: 15 February 2008
- Country: India
- Language: Kannada

Yuga Yugagale Saagali is a 2008 Indian Kannada-language romantic drama film directed by Shashank Raj and starring debutantes Yashas Surya and Megha Ghosh. The film's title is based on a song from Hrudaya Geethe (1989).

== Cast ==
- Yashas Surya as Shashi
- Megha Ghosh as Swati
- Rangayana Raghu
- Anant Nag as Sashi's father
- Sharath Lohitashwa as Narasimha
- Vasanth Kumar
- Sangeetha
- Padmaja Rao

== Soundtrack ==
Music composed by Hamsalekha.

- "Aadanga Bari" - Vijay Yesudas

== Reception ==
A critic from The Times of India rated the film 2.5 out of 5 and wrote that "The acting talent of Rangayana Raghu and Anant Nag is sadly wasted with a weak script". R. G. Vijayasarathy of Rediff.com gave the film the same rating and wrote that "While the story has nothing new to offer, the film scores because of the picturisation of songs, which are pretty good and tight screenplay in the second half". A critic from MyMazaa opined that "This is a love and revenge saga we have seen number of times on silver screen. The debutant director Shashankraj fails to impress with such a wafer thin storyline". A critic from IANS rated the film 3 out of 5 and said that "Yuga Yugagale Saagali is a neatly narrated film which can be watched without any inhibitions by the family audience".
