= Kodaikanal (film) =

- Directed by: T. K. Bose
- Written by: Kanmani Raja Mohammad (dialogues)
- Screenplay by: T. K. Bose
- Story by: R. Raghu
- Produced by: R. Swarnalakshmi
- Starring: Ashwanth Thilak; Poorna; Sekar
- Cinematography: Ravindar
- Edited by: L. Kesavan
- Music by: Deva
- Production company: Sri Swarnalakshmi Movies
- Release date: 14 November 2008
- Running time: 115 minutes
- Country: India
- Language: Tamil

Kodaikanal is a 2008 Tamil language thriller film directed by T. K. Bose. The film stars newcomers Ashwanth Thilak, Poorna and Sekar, with Kandeepan, Vadivukkarasi, Senthil, Scissor Manohar, Alex, Bayilvan Ranganathan and Vijay Krishnaraj playing supporting roles. The film, produced by R. Swarnalakshmi, was released on 14 November 2008.

== Plot ==
Surya (Ashwanth Thilak) and Nandha (Sekar) are orphans and petty thieves who steal for a living in Chennai. When they enter a moneylender’s house to rob, they find the safe completely empty and the moneylender dead. For the crime they haven’t committed, they are held as culprits and cops are there chasing them. The two friends, behind the wheel of a stolen car, head to Kodaikanal, a delightful hill station and a perfect place to hide from the police.

In the meantime, the film actress Brinda (Poorna) is attempted to be kidnapped by her film financier (C. M. Bala) but she manages to escape. Her greedy mother (Vadivukkarasi) and evil uncle (Kandeepan) will get paid a lump sum if she sleeps with the financier. Without money and exhausted, Brinda reaches Kodaikanal, however, her uncle and his gang are after her.

Later, Surya finds Brinda unconscious near a river and he brings her to the stolen car. Brinda who wore skin-darkening makeup and tribe clothes poses as a nomad girl. Surya and Brinda slowly fall in love with each other. Thereafter, the police find their hiding place and are chasing them again in driving rain. During the escape, the rain removed her make-up and Surya is stunned to see Brinda's true face. The three take refuge in an abandoned house and Brinda then tells them about the suffering she has endured when she was with her mother and her uncle. Surya and Brinda, who got to know each other better, subsequently get married with the blessings of Nandha in the house. Her uncle finally found their place thus he beats up Surya and tries to abduct Brinda. To save them, Nandha plunges into the void with her uncle and both died. The film ends with Surya and Brinda, in tears, cremating their friend.

== Cast ==
- Ashwanth Thilak as Surya
- Poorna as Brinda
- Sekar as Nandha
- Kandeepan as Brinda's uncle
- Vadivukkarasi as Brinda's mother
- Senthil as Constable Veerasamy
- Scissor Manohar as Police Constable
- Alex as Police Inspector
- Bayilvan Ranganathan as Police Inspector
- Vijay Krishnaraj as Police Commissioner
- Raj Krishna
- C. M. Bala as Film financier
- Nambirajan as Actor
- K. R. Selvaraj
- R. Veeramani
- Gangai Amaran in a guest appearance

== Production ==
After a break from directing, T. K. Bose who directed films such as Raasave Unnai Nambi (1988), Ennai Vittu Pogaathe (1988) and Pongi Varum Kaveri (1989) made his return with the romantic thriller of sorts Kodaikanal. The film was shot entirely at the hill resort in Kodaikanal. The new face Ashwanth Thilak, the dubbing artist Sekar and Malayalam actress Poorna were selected to play the lead roles. During the shooting of the film, the director and producer filed a complaint against Poorna in the Producers Association due to call sheet problems for the film.

== Soundtrack ==
Kodaikanal

Soundtrack album by Deva
- Released: 2008
- Recorded: 2008
- Genre: Feature film soundtrack
- Length: 29:58
- Producer: Deva

The film score and the soundtrack were composed by Deva. The soundtrack, released in 2008, features 6 tracks with lyrics written by Piraisoodan and Yugabharathi. The audio was released in Chennai by Kamal Haasan and P. Bharathiraja received the first CD. Director Rama Narayanan, producer K. Prabakaran, DGP Vaikunth and producer Rajendran attended the audio launch.

Track	Song	Singer(s)	Lyrics	Duration
1	"Kasu Kasu"	Archith, Malathy Lakshman, Deva	Piraisoodan	4:32
2	"Mettu Mettu"	Harini	Yugabharathi	4:44
3	"Chekka Sivantha Chirukki"	Manikka Vinayagam, Jayalakshmi	Piraisoodan	5:30
4	"Suvaiyanadhu Suvaiyanadhu"	Timmy, Suchitra	Piraisoodan	5:04
5	"Anchu Viralaivichan"	Krishnaraj, Pop Shalini	Piraisoodan	4:40
6	"Chinna China Kathai"	Krishnaraj, Senthildass Velayutham, S. Sathya	Piraisoodan	5:28

== Release ==
The film was released on 14 November 2008 alongside the big-budget film Vaaranam Aayiram.

=== Critical reception ===
A critic from Kollywood Today praised the cinematography and the performance of the lead actors, and concluded, "Kodaikanal is a film that offers a different and relishing to the audiences". In contrast, another reviewer gave a negative review stating, "The story and script are somewhat logically conceived, dated direction and sloppy editing lets Kodaikanal down badly despite spirited performances by Shekar and Poorna".

=== Box office ===
The film took a below average opening at the Chennai box office, beginning in the fourth position the first week and finishing in the ninth position the third week. The film was declared a flop at the box office.
