= Aaghaaz =

- Directed by: Yogesh Ishwar
- Written by: Kamlesh Pandey; Alok Upadhyay (dialogues)
- Screenplay by: Nikhil Saini
- Story by: Posani Krishna Murali
- Based on: Sivayya by Posani Krishna Murali
- Produced by: D. Ramanaidu
- Starring: Sunil Shetty; Sushmita Sen; Namrata Shirodkar
- Cinematography: Shyam K. Naidu
- Edited by: K. V. Krishna Reddy
- Music by: Songs: Anu Malik; Score: M. M. Srilekha
- Distributed by: Suresh Productions
- Release date: 6 October 2000
- Running time: 160 minutes
- Country: India
- Language: Hindi

Aaghaaz (Translated: Beginning) is a 2000 Indian Hindi-language action thriller film directed by Yogesh Ishwar. It is the remake of the Telugu film Sivayya, which was also produced by D. Suresh Babu.

== Plot summary ==
Govind Narang is an honest and chivalrous man from a small village in Punjab. He falls in love with Sudha, but marries his mentor's daughter, Pushpa, to save her from public ridicule. Pushpa was impregnated by a police officer who refused to marry her. She does not love Govind and hates Sudha with passion. Together with her brother, Laxman, Pushpa tries to expel Sudha from the village, but is unsuccessful. When Laxman finds out about Pushpa's infidelity, he poisons her. After his wife's death, Govind relocates to Mumbai with his sister, Ratna. He meets beautiful Gitika, and they fall in love.

One day, as Govind defends the honour of a young girl from the brother of a hoodlum, Johnny Handsome, he elicits hatred and animosity. Johnny is humiliated by Govind and swears vengeance with the help of Sadanand Kutty and Karim Khan Toofani. On the other hand, Govind befriends Ram Sevak and with his help and the assistance of a landowner, he arranges the purchase of a large plot of land so that hawkers and small shop-owners could set up their businesses. But nothing goes according to plan. The plot of land and the owner turn out to be fake, Ram Sevak turns out to be a member of the gangsters, and Govind gets all the blame. His sister is openly raped, and Govind himself gets seriously wounded in broad daylight before the very eyes of the people he defended. Govind is then helped by Sudha, and he decides to exact revenge. He files an FIR against everyone in the neighbourhood who witnessed what happened to his sister, except the culprits themselves. When they are brought to court, he condemns everyone for their attitude, and then tells them to be brave and fight the criminals. Encouraged by this, the entire neighbourhood decides to take on the gang. They attack the gangsters throwing glass bottles when they come to threaten them in the locality, and then move on to Johnny Handsome's office, breaking everything and attacking all the goons. They join Govind and Sudha to attack the gangsters and arrest them. The criminals are sentenced to death, and everything returns to normal. In the end, though, on a happy note, Govind's sister marries a close friend of the family, Harish, and Govind agrees to marry Sudha.

== Cast ==
- Suniel Shetty as Govind Narang
- Sushmita Sen as Inspector Sudha
- Namrata Shirodkar as Gitika
- Suman Ranganathan as Pushpa
- Sharad Kapoor as Laxman
- Akshay Anand as Harish Pati
- Shraddha Nigam as Ratna Narang
- Sharat Saxena as Johnny Handsome Mendoza
- Anupam Kher as Balraj Nanda
- Asrani as Gullu
- Rakesh Bedi as Dilip Roy
- Sudhir Dalvi as Pushpa's father
- Gulshan Grover as Sadanand Kutty
- Viju Khote as Deshpande
- Johnny Lever as Rajni Deva
- Govind Namdeo as Karim Khan Toofani
- Alok Nath as Ram Charan Shukla
- Yunus Parvez as Dheerajlal
- Achyut Potdar as The Judge
- Rajesh Puri as Professor Pillai
- Shiva Rindani as Suku
- Asha Sachdev
- Anjan Srivastav
- Mukesh Tiwari as Danny Mendoza
- Manoj Joshi
- Padmini Kapila as Mrs. Balraj Nanda

== Soundtrack ==
Aaghaaz

Soundtrack album by Anu Malik
- Released: 1 September 2000
- Recorded: 2000
- Genre: Soundtrack
- Length: 44:38
- Label: Tips Music
- Producer: Anu Malik

Anu Malik chronology
Har Dil Jo Pyar Karega (2000)	Aaghaaz (2000)	Fiza (2000)

All lyrics are written by Sameer; all music is composed by Anu Malik.

Track-List
No.	Title	Singer(s)	Length
1.	"Aaghaaz Karo"	Sonu Nigam	8:53
2.	"Dil Dil Dil" (Female)	Hema Sardesai	5:23
3.	"Dil Dil Dil" (Male)	Sonu Nigam	5:22
4.	"Dil Ko Patthar"	Kumar Sanu, Alka Yagnik	7:12
5.	"Dosti Ho Gayi"	Sonu Nigam, Sunidhi Chauhan	6:32
6.	"Man Tera Mera Man"	Babul Supriyo, Alka Yagnik	5:23
7.	"Nav Nav Lakha"	Hema Sardesai, Sunidhi Chauhan, Kumar Sanu, Rahul	5:53
Total length:			44:38
