= Flirt (2025 film) =

2025 Indian Kannada language film

- Directed by: Chandan Kumar
- Written by: Chandan Kumar
- Produced by: Chandan Kumar; Dr. Aravind; Kavitha Gowda; Savithramma
- Starring: Chandan Kumar; Nimika Ratnakar; Girish Shivanna; Akshitha Bhopaiah
- Cinematography: H. C. Venugopal
- Edited by: Vinay Yadhunandan
- Music by: Jassie Gift; Nakul Abhyankar
- Production company: Everest Pictures
- Release date: 28 November 2025
- Country: India
- Language: Kannada

Flirt is a 2025 Indian Kannada language film written, co-produced, and directed by Chandan Kumar. The film stars Chandan Kumar, Nimika Ratnakar, Girish Shivanna, and Akshitha Bhopaiah.

== Cast ==
- Chandan Kumar as Krishna
- Nimika Ratnakar as Saniha
- Girish Shivanna as Bala
- Vinay Gowda
- Avinash
- Rangayana Raghu
- Shruti as Sathya
- Sadhu Kokila as Sadhu Simha
- Akshitha Bhopaiah as Manya
- Ashok Hegde
- Aravind Rao
- Mugu Suresh

== Reception ==
Susmita Sameera of The Times of India said that "Flirt packs in numerous twists and may appeal to viewers who enjoy complex relationship-driven dramas. It aims for an ambitious blend of genres, offering moments that will resonate for some while feeling overwhelming for others." A. Sharadhaa of the Cinema Express said that "Flirt is ambitious, modern, and self-aware. It is neither a conventional love story nor a scandal aimed at eliciting shock value. It reflects how we are perceived, how we act, and how trust and loyalty shape our choices." Y. Maheswara Reddy of the Bangalore Mirror said that "Flirt is an entertaining film that offers a good mix of romance, comedy, and court drama. It is worth watching for moviegoers looking for a lighthearted romantic entertainer."
