= Sivayya =

- Directed by: R. Suresh Varma
- Written by: Posani Krishna Murali
- Produced by: D. Ramanaidu
- Starring: Rajasekhar; Sanghavi
- Music by: M. M. Srilekha
- Production company: Suresh Productions
- Release date: 27 March 1998
- Country: India
- Language: Telugu

Sivayya (transl. Lord Shiva) is a 1998 Indian Telugu action drama film directed by R. Suresh Varma and written by Posani Krishna Murali. The film stars Rajasekhar, Sanghavi, Monica Bedi and Srihari.

The film was a box office success. It was later dubbed in Tamil as Thalaivaa. It was also remade in Hindi as Aaghaaz and in Kannada as Dandanayaka.

== Cast ==
- Rajasekhar as Sivayya
- Monica Bedi as Inspector Roja
- Sanghavi as Sirisha
- Srihari
- Ravi Babu
- Raja Ravindra
- Chitti Babu
- Rajitha
- Narasimha Raju
- Mohan Raj
- Chalapathi Rao
- Giri Babu
- Krishnaveni
- Bangalore Padma
- Rama Prabha
- Amanchi Venkata Subrahmanyam
- Jaya Prakash Reddy
- Gundu Hanumantha Rao
- Siva Parvathi

== Soundtrack ==
The soundtrack were composed by M. M. Srilekha. The soundtrack, released in 1998, features five tracks with lyrics written by C. Narayana Reddy and Chandrabose.

Song	Singer(s)	Lyrics	Duration
'Modatisaari'	K. S. Chithra, S. P. Balasubrahmanyam	Chandrabose	4:35
'O Ranganadha'	S. P. Balasubrahmanyam, K. S. Chithra	Chandrabose	5:24
'Nadhichey Devudu'	K. S. Chithra, S. P. Balasubrahmanyam	Chandrabose	3.72
'21st Century'	M. M. Srilekha	Chandrabose	5:00
Ekkadundhira	K. S. Chithra, S. P. Balasubrahmanyam	C. Narayana Reddy	4:05

== Reception ==
A critic from Andhra Online rated the film three out of five stars and wrote, "A successful movie worth watching from the director, Suresh Verma, paired with a strong story, dialogue and screenplay by Krishna Murali. Dr. Rajasekhar's acting is a big plus for this movie to be a hit. His emoting and histrionics coupled with swift action even in the scenes involving Jyothi and gang will appeal to the audience". Reviewing the Tamil dubbed version, D. S. Ramanujam of The Hindu wrote, "Director Suresh Varma has worked well on his story and screenplay to create new, appealing situations, particularly in the closing stages, suitable and acceptable only in this medium".

== Awards ==
Nandi Awards

- Best Male Dubbing Artist – A. Srinivasa Murthy for Rajashekar
