= Pannaga Bharana =

Indian film director and actor

- Born: Bangalore, Karnataka, India
- Occupations: director, actor
- Years active: 2009–present
- Spouse: Nikitha Bharana (m. 2014)
- Parent(s): T. S. Nagabharana (father); Nagini Nagabharana (mother)

Pannaga Bharana is an Indian film director and actor who works in Kannada cinema. He is the son of film director T. S. Nagabharana. He rose to fame with 2017 film Happy New Year.

== Career ==
Bharana started working professionally in the film industry at the age of five when he debuted on one of the most-loved television series Tenali Rama, aired on the DD National Channel (1990). In the same year, he played a crucial role in The Stone Boy, an Indio-Mauritius Project (1990). His played roles in Chinnari Mutha (1993) and Naviddeve Yecharike (1996).

== Theatre ==
Unlike most commercial artists, Pannaga Bharana has pursued theatre while simultaneously working on big budget productions. Between 2002 and 2009, Pannaga worked closely with the notable director B.V. Karanth on a series of projects like Gokula Nirgamana, Hayavadana, Jokumara Swamy, Kathale Belaku, Tabarana Kathe, and Sattavara Neralu.

== Filmography ==
Key
†	Denotes films that have not yet been released

Year	Film	Director	Writer	Producer	Notes
2017	Happy New Year	Yes	Yes	No	
2018	Kaanoorayana	Co-director	Screenplay	No	
2020	French Biriyani	Yes	Yes	No	Won – SIIMA Best Director
2023	Tatsama Tadbhava	No	No	Yes	
TBA	Maduve Impossible †	Yes	Yes	No	Announced

=== As actor ===
Year	Film	Role	Notes
1993	Chinnari Mutha		Child actor
1996	Naviddeve Yecharike		Child actor
2014	Vasundara		
2015	Mrugashira		Won – SIIMA Best Actor in Supporting Role

=== Television ===
Year	Film	Role	Channel	Notes
1991	The Stone Boy		DD National	Child actor
