= Aquarium (film) =

2022 film directed by Deepesh T

- Directed by: Deepesh T.
- Written by: Deepesh T.
- Screenplay by: Balram Mattannur
- Produced by: Shaji Kannambeth
- Starring: Honey Rose; Sunny Wayne; Shari
- Cinematography: Pradeesh M. Varma
- Edited by: Ragesh Narayanan
- Music by: Madhu Govind
- Release date: April 9, 2022 (India)
- Running time: 94 minutes
- Country: India
- Language: Malayalam

Aquarium is a 2022 Indian Malayalam-language drama film written and directed by Deepesh T. The film's screenplay is written by Balram Mattannur. The film features Honey Rose, Rajshri Ponnappa and Sunny Wayne in lead roles. The film was released on Saina Play OTT Platform on 9 April 2022. There was a long case on high court which prevents the release of this film for 10 years.

== Cast ==
- Honey Rose as Sister Elcita
- Rajshri Ponnappa as Sister Jaseentha
- Sunny Wayne as Father Shibu
- Shari as Mother Superior
- Sabu Cyril as Jesus
- V K Prakash
- Sathar
- Santha Kumari
- Urmila Unni
- Theertha Ratnakaran
- Dhanya Malu

== Production ==
The film began production under the title Pithavinum Puthranum. Kannada actress Rajshri Ponnappa made her Malayalam debut with this film playing a nun.

== Release ==
The principal photography was completed in 2013. The release of the film was delayed by various cases against this film due to its controversial content. Later a release was scheduled on 13 May 2021. But there was a stay order upon this release from High court of Kerala. At last the film was released on 9 April 2022.
