= Mrugashira =

2015 Kannada language film

- Directed by: Srivatsa
- Written by: Srivatsa
- Produced by: Sarvamangala Channappa
- Starring: Prajwal Devaraj; Manasa Himavarsha; Ananth Nag; Avinash; Tabla Nani; Pannaga Bharana; Sadhu Kokila
- Cinematography: Srinivas Ramaiah
- Edited by: Vinod Manohar
- Music by: Ravi Basrur
- Release date: 15 May 2015
- Country: India
- Language: Kannada

Mrugashira is a 2015 Indian Kannada-language film directed by Srivatsa, starring Prajwal Devaraj, Manasa Himavarsha, Ananth Nag, Tabla Nani, Pannaga Bharana and Sadhu Kokila in lead roles.

== Cast ==
- Prajwal Devaraj as Prajwal
- Manasa Himavarsha
- Ananth Nag
- Avinash
- Tabla Nani
- Pannaga Bharana
- Sadhu Kokila

== Soundtrack ==
Mrugashira

Soundtrack album by Ravi Basrur
- Released: 2015
- Recorded: 2015
- Genre: Feature film soundtrack
- Length: 16:18
- Language: Kannada

Ravi Basrur chronology
Ekka Saka (2015)	Mrugashira (2015)	Ring Master (2015)

Official audio
- Mrugashira - Full Album on YouTube

Track listing
No.	Title	Lyrics	Singer(s)	Length
1.	"Pade Pade Kaano Hambala"	Ravi Basrur	Haricharan, Anuradha Bhat	4:32
2.	" Oota Maadro"	Yogaraj Bhat	Arjun Janya	4:05
3.	"Yello Kulithiruve Sri Rama"	Thyag Raj, Ravi Basrur	Hari	3:15
4.	"Ee Urudha Para Urudha"	Ashok Neelavar	Jai Sriram	3:11
5.	"Kadala Magala - Bit"	Ravi Basrur	Ravi Basrur	1:15
Total length:				16:18

== Reception ==
=== Critical response ===
The Hindu wrote "Ananth Nag plays the role of an ancestral priest featuring predominantly in a cameo song at the beginning of the film. However, the song too is rather ludicrous for its use of background dancers dressed as several Hanumans. Sadhu Kokila is introduced in the film apparently for comic relief, but his jokes about how he got a transgender pregnant are cringe-worthy and offensive. Mrugashira is bizarre to say the least". The Times of India scored the film at 2 out of 5 stars and says "Ananth Nag and Avinash have limited roles and do justice to what's offered to them. What is commendable in the film, though, is the cinematography. The locations look grand. But, that's where the praise ends". Bangalore Mirror wrote "Prajwal is improving as an actor with each film but the same does not go for his films. Attention to detail was probably never on the minds of those who made this film. The film has too much fantasy but with neither the budget nor the skill to create the make-believe. The only fun you can have fun is at the film’s expense".
