= Abbara =

- Directed by: K Ram Narayan
- Produced by: Basavaraj Manchaiah
- Starring: Prajwal Devaraj; Nimika Ratnakar; Rajshri Ponnappa; Lekha Chandra; P. Ravishankar
- Cinematography: JK Ganesh
- Edited by: Venkatesh UDV
- Music by: Ravi Basrur
- Production companies: C & M Movies
- Release date: 5 January 2022
- Running time: 148 minutes
- Country: India
- Language: Kannada

Abbara is a 2022 Indian Kannada language romantic action drama film directed by K Ram Narayan and starring Prajwal Devaraj, Nimika Ratnakar, Rajshri Ponnappa, Lekha Chandra and P. Ravishankar. The film was released to mixed reviews.

== Cast ==
- Prajwal Devaraj as Shiva a.k.a. Strong Man / Prasad / Shivu
- Nimika Ratnakar as Sonu
- Rajshri Ponnappa as Vaishali
- Lekha Chandra as Dr. Priya
- P. Ravishankar as Vairamudi
- Shobaraj as a boy's father
- M. S. Umesh
- Kote Prabhakar
- Arasu Maharaj
- Vijay Chendoor
- Govinde Gowda

== Production ==
Prajwal Devaraj was reported to play three characters in the film (opposite Nimika Ratnakar, Rajshri Ponnappa, and Lekha Chandra) with five different looks.

== Soundtrack ==
The music was composed by Ravi Basrur. The music was released under the Anand Audio label.

Track listing
No.	Title	Singer(s)	Length
1.	"Thale Kettaga Onde Formula"	Vijay Prakash	3:32
2.	"O Sukumaariye"	Vyasaraj Sosale, Neethu Subramanyam	3:25
3.	"Naanu Neenu"	Santhosh Venky	3:46
4.	"Abbara Title Track"	Santhosh Venky	2:43
5.	"Kathakali"	Saaj Bhat	3:30
6.	"Devara Haaga Nee (F)"	Airaa Udupi	2:48
7.	"Devara Haaga Nee (M)"	Rahul Vellal	2:48
Total length:			22:32

== Reception ==
=== Critical response ===
A critic from Cinema Express rated the film 2.5 out of 5 and wrote that "Overall, Abbara is definitely a watchable film for those who have been missing age-old masala flicks". A critic from Bangalore Mirror wrote that "All in all, Abbara is worth a watch for sheer entertainment". A critic from The South First wrote that "Abbara is made exclusively for a special kind of daredevils. Do share your experiences with us if you are up for the Abbara challenge".
