= P. Ravi Shankar =

Indian actor (born 1966)

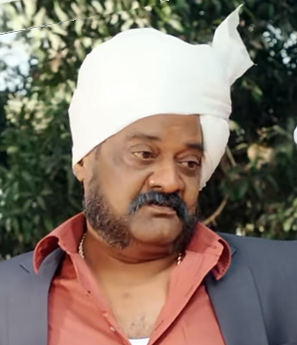
- P. Ravishankar in 2023 Kannada film Garadi
- Born: Pudipeddi Ravi Shankar; 28 November 1966 (age 59); Madras, Madras State (now Chennai, Tamil Nadu), India
- Other names: Armuga Ravi; Bommali Ravi Shankar; Sai Ravi; Kempegowda Ravi Shankar
- Occupations: Actor; dubbing artist; writer; director
- Years active: 1978–1981 (child artist); 1986–present
- Works: Partial list
- Spouse: Suchil
- Children: 1
- Parent: P. J. Sarma (father)
- Relatives: Sai Kumar (brother); Ayyappa P. Sharma (brother); Aadi (nephew)

Pudipeddi Ravi Shankar (born 28 November 1966), also known as Sai Ravi, is an Indian actor, dubbing artist, director and writer. As an actor, he predominantly appears in Kannada films, in addition to Telugu and Tamil films. He has dubbed for over 3,500 films, more than 1000 each being in Telugu and Tamil, and over 150 in Kannada.

Son of the actor P. J. Sarma and the younger brother of actor Sai Kumar, Ravi Shankar made his directorial debut with the Kannada film Durgi in 2004. Shankar worked as a dialogue writer, writing dialogues for over 75 Telugu films and its Tamil counterparts. He also worked as a playback singer for Telugu films, such as Rakta Charitra and Bejawada. He gained recognition for his role in the 2011 Kannada film Kempe Gowda, for which he won the Filmfare Award for Best Supporting Actor – Kannada.

== Early and personal life ==
P. Ravi Shankar was born to Telugu parents in Chennai, Tamil Nadu. Ravi Shankar's mother, Krishna Jyothy Pudipeddi, was a Telugu actress, who acted with Kannada thespian Dr. Rajkumar and others in films such as Sri Krishna Garudi, Makkala Rajya and others. Ravi Shankar's father, Pudipeddi Jogeswara Sharma, was also an actor and dubbing artist who worked in many Telugu, Kannada and Tamil films. His elder brother, Pudipeddi Sai Kumar entered the film industry as a dubbing artist and later became an actor in the Kannada Film Industry.

Shankar is married to Suchil, a Punjabi woman, and the couple has a son, Adhvey. In 2018, Ravi Shankar announced that he would launch Adhvey as an actor in his own directorial film in Kannada.

== Career ==
P. Ravi Shankar made his film debut as a lead actor in 1986 with R. Narayana Murthy's Telugu film Aalochinchandi. He was later seen in supporting roles in films such as Madhura Nagarilo and Keechurallu. With no more offers, Ravi took a hiatus from acting and re-entered as a villain in 2001 with Gopi Chand's debut film Tholi Valapu. Lack of success in his acting career forced him to pursue dubbing as a profession like his father and brother. His first professional dub was the Telugu film Rowdyism Nasinchali, where he dubbed for Tamil actor Mohan Raj.

He continued to dub for many character artists from other languages such as Raghuvaran, Mohan Raj, Devaraj, Charan Raj, Captain Raju, Nassar, Ashish Vidyarthi, Prakash Raj, Ashutosh Rana, Sonu Sood, Mukesh Rishi, Upendra and Pradeep Rawat etc.

In 2004, he directed a Kannada film titled Durgi, starring Malashri. The film was later remade in Telugu as Narasimhudu, starring N. T. Rama Rao Jr., Ameesha Patel and Sameera Reddy. Ravi provided the story for the film which was directed by B. Gopal. The film was heavily criticized and bombed at the box office.

His dubbing work in the 2009 film Arundhati, where he voiced for Sonu Sood, was praised in a review of Idlebrain. He won the Nandi Award for Best Male Dubbing Artist for his performance in the film and was referred to as "Bommali Ravi Shankar" by the Telugu media.

His breakthrough role was from the 2011 Kannada film Kempe Gowda. The film's popularity led to Ravishankar being called "Kempegowda Ravishankar" or "Arumugam Ravishankar" and he grew to become a household name in Karnataka. His performance was not only widely praised by the critics.

Ravi Shankar, after Kempe Gowda, became a busy supporting actor in the Kannada cinema. He then acted in films such as Manikya, Dandupalya, Adhyaksha, Charulatha, Bachchan, Edegarike, Varadanayaka and others. He was also seen in Telugu films such as Kurradu and Happy Happy Ga and in Tamil films such as Vettaikaaran and Kollaikaran.

== Awards and nominations ==
He won his first Nandi Award for Best Male Dubbing Artist in 1999 for Ram Gopal Varma's Prema Katha. He dubbed for Manoj Bajpai in the film. He won his second Nandi Award in 2002 for Chiranjeevi's Indra, in which he dubbed for Mukesh Rishi. His next Nandi Award was in 2004 for his dubbing in S. S. Rajamouli's Sye. He dubbed for Pradeep Rawat in the film. He won four consecutive Nandi Awards from 2006 to 2009 for the films Pokiri, Athidhi, Arundhati and Anjaneyulu respectively. He also won Tamil Nadu State Film Award for Best Male Dubbing Artist for his dubbing for Ashish Vidyarthi in 2001 film Dhill.

| Title | Award | Category | Result | Ref. |
|---|---|---|---|---|
| Prema Katha | Nandi Awards of 1999 | Best Male Dubbing Artist | Won | |
| Indra | Nandi Awards of 2002 | Best Male Dubbing Artist | Won | |
| Dhill | Tamil Nadu State Film Awards 2002 | Best Male Dubbing Artist | Won | |
| Sye | Nandi Awards of 2004 | Best Male Dubbing Artist | Won | |
| Pokiri | Nandi Awards of 2006 | Best Male Dubbing Artist | Won | |
| Athidhi | Nandi Awards of 2007 | Best Male Dubbing Artist | Won | |
| Arundhati | Nandi Awards of 2008 | Best Male Dubbing Artist | Won | |
| Anjaneyulu | Nandi Awards of 2009 | Best Male Dubbing Artist | Won | |
| Siruthai | Tamil Nadu State Film Awards 2011 | Best Male Dubbing Artist | Won | |
| Kempe Gowda | 59th Filmfare Awards South | Best Supporting Actor – Kannada | Won | |
| Kempe Gowda | The Bangalore Times Film Awards | Best Actor in a Negative Role | Won | |
| Damarukam | Filmfare Awards South | Best Supporting Actor – Telugu | Won | |
| Julayi | Nandi Awards of 2012 | Best Male Dubbing Artist | Won | |
| Maanikya | 4th SIIMA Awards | Best Actor in a Negative Role | Won | |
| Aatagara | 63rd Filmfare Awards South | Best Supporting Actor – Kannada | Won | |
| Baahubali: The Beginning | Nandi Awards of 2015 | Best Male Dubbing Artist | Won | |
| College Kumar | 65th Filmfare Awards South | Best Supporting Actor – Kannada | Won | |
| Raambo 2 | 66th Filmfare Awards South | Best Supporting Actor – Kannada | Won | |
| Natasaarvabhowma | 4th SIIMA Awards | Best Actor in a Negative Role | Won | |
| Kotigobba 3 | 10th SIIMA Awards | Best Actor in a Comic Role | Won | |
