= Sekar P. R. =

Indian voice actor and dubbing director

- Born: Rudrapathy Sekar; Chennai, Tamil Nadu, India
- Other names: Rudrapathy Sekar, Shekar
- Occupations: Voice actor; dubbing director; dialogue writer; actor
- Years active: 1980–present
- Spouse: Gayathri Sekar
- Children: 2
- Parent(s): K. P. Rudrapathy (father); Danam Rudrapathy (mother)
- Awards: Tamil Nadu State Film Award for Best Male Dubbing Artist

Sekar P. R., also known as Rudrapathy Sekar, is an Indian voice actor, dubbing director, dialogue writer and actor who works primarily in Tamil. Over a career of more than three decades he has provided the Tamil voice for the lead actors of several of the highest-grossing Indian films, including Prabhas in the Baahubali films, Yash in the K.G.F films, Allu Arjun in Pushpa: The Rise and Pushpa 2: The Rule, and Shah Rukh Khan in Jawan. In 2022 he voiced the leads of two of that year's biggest Kannada successes, Yash in K.G.F: Chapter 2 and Rakshit Shetty in 777 Charlie. He is the Tamil voice of Yash as Ravana in Nitesh Tiwari's Ramayana: Part 1 (2026).

On television, he voiced Rama in the Tamil version of Ramanand Sagar's Ramayan and Krishna in B. R. Chopra's Mahabharat, and later both voiced Rama and wrote the Tamil dialogues for Ramayan (2008). He received the Tamil Nadu State Film Award for Best Male Dubbing Artist for Malarinum Melliya.

== Early life and background ==
Sekar was born in Chennai into a Tamil family of stage performers. His father, K. P. Rudrapathy, led a drama troupe and was known on stage for playing Hanuman. Rudrapathy also worked with director A. P. Nagarajan, designing many of the trick shots and sets used in films of that era.

Sekar began performing at the age of three in his father's troupe. At six he appeared in a social drama and received Best Child Artist honours from the governments of Tamil Nadu and Puducherry at a theatre festival, as well as from Mylapore Fine Arts. Over the following years he played roles including Ayyappan, Narada, Ram, Arjuna and Ashwatthama, appearing in more than 1,000 stage productions.

== Career ==
=== Dubbing ===
Sekar began dubbing for films before the age of ten, initially voicing child characters. His first dubbing role for a lead actor was Ajith Kumar in the Tamil film Pavithra (1994). Through the 1990s and 2000s he regularly voiced actors including Abbas, Vineeth, Kunal, Shaam and Vignesh in Tamil films. He also voiced Tamil versions of Hindi and Telugu releases, among them Aamir Khan in Rangeela (1995).

In 2007 he became the Tamil voice of Shah Rukh Khan as host of Kaun Banega Crorepati on Vijay TV. He has since voiced Khan in several films, and has also dubbed for Salman Khan, making him the only Tamil voice actor to have dubbed for all three of Hindi cinema's leading "Khans": Shah Rukh Khan, Salman Khan and Aamir Khan.

His profile rose with Baahubali: The Beginning (2015) and Baahubali 2: The Conclusion (2017), in which he voiced Prabhas as Amarendra Baahubali. He then became the regular Tamil voice for several pan-Indian leads:

- Yash in K.G.F: Chapter 1 (2018), K.G.F: Chapter 2 (2022) and Toxic (2026).
- Allu Arjun in Pushpa: The Rise (2021) and Pushpa 2: The Rule (2024).
- Ranveer Singh in Bajirao Mastani, Padmaavat and 83.
- Ram Charan in Maaveeran, the Tamil version of Magadheera.
- Vivek Oberoi in Ratha Sarithiram (2010), the Tamil version of Ram Gopal Varma's Rakta Charitra, and later in Vivegam (2017).

He voiced the actors portraying both of India's World Cup–winning cricket captains: Sushant Singh Rajput as M. S. Dhoni in M.S. Dhoni: The Untold Story (2016) and Ranveer Singh as Kapil Dev in 83 (2021). On two occasions he has voiced two characters in the same film. In Saaho (2019) he voiced both Prabhas and Jackie Shroff, and in En Peyar Surya (2018) he voiced both Allu Arjun and Arjun Sarja.

In Hollywood films he has voiced James McAvoy as Charles Xavier in the X-Men films, Ryan Reynolds in Deadpool, Paul Rudd as Ant-Man in the Marvel Cinematic Universe, and Chris Tucker in the Rush Hour films. According to Sekar, he has dubbed more than 2,000 roles across films, television and animation.

=== Mythological and historical television ===
Sekar is particularly associated with mythological television. He voiced Arun Govil's Rama in the Tamil version of Ramayan and Nitish Bharadwaj's Krishna in the Tamil version of Mahabharat, including the Bhagavad Gita discourse. For this work the International Society for Krishna Consciousness (ISKCON) made him an honorary life member. In the 2000s he voiced Rama again and wrote the Tamil dialogues for the Tamil version of the 2008 Ramayan, broadcast on Sun TV. With Nitesh Tiwari's Ramayana, he voices Ravana, having earlier voiced Rama in two separate television adaptations of the epic.

=== Dialogue writing and dubbing direction ===
Sekar began writing Tamil dubbing dialogue at a young age. His early credits include the Tamil versions of the Doordarshan sitcom Dekh Bhai Dekh, a Doordarshan serial by Kutty Padmini, a television series by Revathi, and Street Hawk. His writing covers a wide range of genres and audiences. For mythological and historical series such as Jai Veer Hanuman (Jaya TV), Shirdi Sai Baba (Vijay TV), Mahabharat and Chanakya, he writes formal, classical Tamil. For children's television and animation, including Best of Luck Nikki and Ice Age: Collision Course, he writes accessible, family-friendly dialogue. For adult comedy, he wrote the irreverent, slang-heavy Tamil script of Deadpool (2016), in which he also voiced the title character. His Tamil versions of Deadpool and Ice Age: Collision Course were both commercially successful in Tamil Nadu.

As a dubbing director and writer for streaming platforms, he has handled Tamil adaptations of Farzi, The Mehta Boys, He-Man and the Masters of the Universe and Wrecking Crew. He was also Tamil and Telugu voice director for Matka King.

=== Acting and other work ===
Sekar played the lead in Kodaikanal (2008) and has had supporting roles in Payanam (2011), Gautham Vasudev Menon's Yennai Arindhaal (2015) and Seeru (2020). On television he has acted in Bala Ganapathy (Vijay TV), Uyir Mei and Nalla Neram (Zee Tamil), Maya (Jaya TV) and Aswathama (Doordarshan).

He has appeared in television commercials, including two 7 Up campaigns directed by Gautham Vasudev Menon, one with Dhanush and one with Puneeth Rajkumar, and a Shriram Chits commercial directed by P. C. Sreeram. He has also worked as a model and assisted P. C. Sreeram on several advertising films. He was creative director of The Sound Story (2019), directed by Prasad Prabhakar.

== Personal life ==
Sekar is married to Gayathri; they have two sons, Akshath Tej and Vilva.

== Awards and honours ==
Year	Award	Category	Work	Ref.
2007	Tamil Nadu State Film Awards	Best Male Dubbing Artist	Malarinum Melliya	
2017	Studio One Awards	Best Dubbing Artist	Baahubali 2: The Conclusion	
2018	Kural Selvam Awards	Best Male Voice Artist	—	
—	Government of Tamil Nadu; Government of Puducherry; Mylapore Fine Arts	Best Child Artist (theatre)	Stage	
—	ISKCON	Honorary life membership	Mahabharat (Tamil)	

== Filmography ==
=== As actor ===
==== Films ====
Year	Title	Role	Notes
2008	Kodaikanal	Nandha	Lead role
2011	Payanam	News anchor	
2015	Yennai Arindhaal	Assistant police officer	
2018	Adanga Maru		Scene deleted from theatrical cut
2020	Seeru	Assistant Commissioner Kishore	

==== Television ====
Title	Network
Bala Ganapathy	Vijay TV
Uyir Mei	Zee Tamil
Nalla Neram	Zee Tamil
Maya	Jaya TV
Aswathama	Doordarshan

=== As voice actor ===
==== Tamil films ====
Year	Title	Actor	Role	Notes
1994	Pavithra	Ajith Kumar	Ashok	
1996	Kadhal Desam	Vineeth	Karthik	
1996	Chellakannu	Vignesh		
1997	Nandhini	Vineeth		
1999	Kadhalar Dhinam	Kunal	Raja	
1999	Malabar Police	Abbas		
1999	Monisha En Monalisa	Raman Trikha		
1999	Suyamvaram	Abbas, Vignesh		
2001	Aanandham	Abbas		
2001	Kanna Unnai Thedukiren	Sathyan		
2001	Shahjahan	Krishna		
2002	Kadhal Virus	Richard Rishi	Deepak	
2002	Varushamellam Vasantham	Kunal	Ramesh	
2002	Pesadha Kannum Pesume	Kunal	Vikram	
2002	Punnagai Desam	Kunal, Krishna		
2002	123	Raju Sundaram		
2003	Enakku 20 Unakku 18	Tarun	Sridhar	
2003	Kurumbu	Allari Naresh	Ravi	
2005	Ullam Ketkumae	Shaam	Shaam	
2005	Bambara Kannaley	Vikramaditya	Gautham	
2005	Chinna	Vikramaditya		
2008	Malarinum Melliya	Vignesh	Elango	Tamil Nadu State Film Award for Best Male Dubbing Artist
2009	TN 07 AL 4777	Ajmal Ameer		
2011	Payanam	Nagarjuna	Major Raveendra	
2015	Vedalam	Kabir Duhan Singh	Abhinay	
2017	Vivegam	Vivek Oberoi	Aryan Singha	
2018	Bhaskar Oru Rascal	Aftab Shivdasani	Sanjay	
2019	Kanchana 3	Kabir Duhan Singh		

==== Dubbed films ====
Year	Title	Actor	Role	Original language	Notes
1995	Rangeela	Aamir Khan	Munna	Hindi	
1998	Rush Hour	Chris Tucker	James Carter	English	
2004	Desam	Shah Rukh Khan	Mohan Bhargav	Hindi	Tamil version of Swades
2007	Don	Nagarjuna	Surya	Telugu	
2009	Maaveeran	Ram Charan	Harsha / Kala Bhairava	Telugu	Tamil version of Magadheera
2010	Ratha Sarithiram	Vivek Oberoi	Pratap Ravi	Telugu, Hindi	Tamil version of Rakta Charitra
2011	X-Men: First Class	James McAvoy	Charles Xavier	English	
2012	Businessman	Mahesh Babu	Surya	Telugu	
2013	Chennai Express	Shah Rukh Khan	Rahul	Hindi	Television version
2014	Happy New Year	Shah Rukh Khan	Charlie	Hindi	
2015	Baahubali: The Beginning	Prabhas	Amarendra Baahubali	Telugu	
2015	Ant-Man	Paul Rudd	Scott Lang / Ant-Man	English	
2015	Bajirao Mastani	Ranveer Singh	Baji Rao I	Hindi	
2015	Rudhramadevi	Allu Arjun	Gona Ganna Reddy	Telugu	
2016	Deadpool	Ryan Reynolds	Wade Wilson / Deadpool	English	Also dialogue writer
2016	Captain America: Civil War	Paul Rudd	Scott Lang / Ant-Man	English	
2016	M.S. Dhoni: The Untold Story	Sushant Singh Rajput	M. S. Dhoni	Hindi	
2016	The Angry Birds Movie	Jason Sudeikis	Red	English	Animated
2017	Baahubali 2: The Conclusion	Prabhas	Amarendra Baahubali	Telugu	
2018	K.G.F: Chapter 1	Yash	Rocky	Kannada	
2018	Padmaavat	Ranveer Singh	Alauddin Khalji	Hindi	
2018	En Peyar Surya	Allu Arjun, Arjun Sarja	Surya; Surya's father	Telugu	Tamil version of Naa Peru Surya
2018	Ant-Man and the Wasp	Paul Rudd	Scott Lang / Ant-Man	English	
2019	Avengers: Endgame	Paul Rudd	Scott Lang / Ant-Man	English	
2019	Saaho	Prabhas, Jackie Shroff	Saaho; Narantak Roy	Telugu, Hindi	
2019	Kurukshetram	Darshan	Duryodhana	Kannada	
2020	Vaikunthapuram	Allu Arjun	Bantu	Telugu	Tamil version of Ala Vaikunthapurramuloo
2021	Pushpa: The Rise	Allu Arjun	Pushpa Raj	Telugu	
2021	83	Ranveer Singh	Kapil Dev	Hindi	
2022	K.G.F: Chapter 2	Yash	Rocky	Kannada	
2022	777 Charlie	Rakshit Shetty	Dharma	Kannada	
2022	Radhe Shyam	Prabhas	Vikramaditya	Telugu	
2023	Jawan	Shah Rukh Khan	Vikram Rathore / Azad Rathore	Hindi	
2024	Pushpa 2: The Rule	Allu Arjun	Pushpa Raj	Telugu	
2024	Martin	Dhruva Sarja		Kannada	
2025	Sita Payanam			Kannada	
2026	Toxic	Yash	Raya	Kannada, English	
2026	Ramayana: Part 1	Yash	Ravana	Hindi	Upcoming

==== Television ====
Year	Title	Voice for	Network	Notes
1980s–90s	Ramayan	Arun Govil (Ram)		Tamil version
1990s	Mahabharat	Nitish Bharadwaj (Krishna)		Tamil version
2007	Kaun Banega Crorepati (season 3)	Shah Rukh Khan (host)	Vijay TV	Tamil version
2008	Ramayan	Gurmeet Choudhary (Ram)	Sun TV	Also dialogue writer
2009	Dragon Ball Z	Zordan		Animated
2011–2014	Best of Luck Nikki	Avatar Singh	Disney Channel	

=== As dialogue writer ===
Title	Network / release
Dekh Bhai Dekh	Doordarshan
Street Hawk	
Kaun Banega Crorepati	Vijay TV
Ramayan (2008)	Sun TV
Mahabharat	Doordarshan
Vishnu Puran	Doordarshan
Jai Veer Hanuman	Jaya TV
Shirdi Sai Baba	Vijay TV
Chanakya	Jaya TV
Shaktimaan	Doordarshan
Mann Vasanai (Balika Vadhu)	Raj TV
Best of Luck Nikki	Disney Channel
The Suite Life of Karan & Kabir	Disney Channel
The Da Vinci Code (2006)	Theatrical
Deadpool (2016)	Theatrical
Ice Age: Collision Course (2016)	Theatrical
Ben-Hur (2016)	Theatrical

=== As dubbing director ===
Title	Platform	Notes
Farzi	Prime Video	Tamil
The Mehta Boys	Prime Video	Tamil
He-Man and the Masters of the Universe		Tamil
Wrecking Crew	Prime Video	Tamil
Matka King		Tamil and Telugu voice direction
