= Nandi Awards of 1999 =

Indian film awards

The Nandi Awards for the year 1999 were announced by Andhra Pradesh Government at a news conference in Hyderabad. Kalisundam Raa, starring Venkatesh, won the best film award followed by Nee Kosam and Prema Katha. Venkatesh won best actor award for Kalisundham Raa, Maheswari won the best actress award for Nee Kosam, and Ramgopal Varma won the best director award for Prema Katha.

== 1999 Nandi Awards Winners List ==
Category	Winner	Film
Best Feature Film	Kalisundam Raa	Kalisundam Raa
Second Best Feature Film	Nee Kosam	Nee Kosam
Third Best Feature Film	Prema Katha	Prema Katha
Best Actor	Venkatesh	kalisundam Raa
Best Actress	Maheswari	Nee Kosam
Best Director	Ram Gopal Varma	Prema Katha
Nandi Award for Best Director for (Best Film/Producer)	D.Suresh Babu	kalisundam Raa
Best Music Director	Vandemataram Srinivas	Swayamvaram
Best Male Playback Singer	Hariharan	Annayya
Best Female Playback Singer	Chithra	Swayamvaram
Best Story Writer	Dinraj; Uday Shankar	kalisundam Raa
Best Supporting Actor	K Viswanath	kalisundam Raa
Best Supporting Actress	Radhika	Prema Katha
Best Character Actor	Mallikarjuna Rao	Thammudu
Nandi Award for Best Character Actress	Nirmalamma	Seetharama Raju
Best Child Actor	Mahendra	Devi
Best Child Actress		
Best Cinematographer	Venkata Prasad	Prema Katha
Best Screenplay Writer	Srinu Vaitla	Nee Kosam
Best Dialogue Writer	L.B. Sri Ram	Ramasakkanodu
Best Lyricist	Sirivennela Sitaramasastri	Prema Katha
Best Art Director	Sreenivasa Raju	Rajakumarudu
Best First Film of a Director	Srinu Vaitla	Nee Kosam
Best Audiographer	Madhusudhana Reddy	Samudram
Best Editor	Shankar	Samudram
Best Male Comedian	M. S. Narayana	Ramasakkanodu
Best Female Comedian	Sri Lakshmi	Police
Best Villain	Tanikella Bharani	Samudram
Choreographe	Lawrence	Annayya
Best Film Critic on Telugu Cinema	Vaasiraju Prakasam	
Best Fight Master	Kanal Kannan	Annayya
Special Jury Award	Venu	Swayamvaram
Special Jury Award	Srihari	Police /
Nandi Award for Akkineni Award for best home-viewing feature film	Raja Kumarudu	Raja Kumarudu
Sarojini Devi Award for a Film on National Integration	Bharatha Ratna	Bharatha Ratna
Best Documentary Film	Surabhi	Surabhi
Second Best Documentary Film	Amma Kani O Amma	Amma Kani O Amma
Best Children's Film	Pathanamlo Pasi Vaadu	Pathanamlo Pasi Vaadu
Second Best Children's Film		
