= Yashas Surya =

Indian actor

- Occupation: Actor
- Years active: 2008–present
- Notable work: Garadi (2023)
- Spouse: Ambika (m. 2021)

Yashas Surya is an Indian actor, who works in Kannada-language films.

== Career ==
Yashas Surya played lead roles in Yuga Yugagale Saagali (2008) and Shishira (2009) before playing supporting roles in many films, particularly starring Darshan. He underwent training for the historical film Ramadhanya (2018), which saw him playing three roles including Kanaka Dasa. The film was also partially set in the present.

He played trained to play a wrestler in Yogaraj Bhat's Garadi (2023).

== Personal life ==
He married Ambika, a management professional, on 11 August 2021.

== Filmography ==
Year	Title	Role	Notes
2008	Yuga Yugagale Saagali	Shashi	
2009	Shishira	Suraj	
2012	Chingari	Yashas Surya	
2013	Shravani Subramanya	Sudeep	
2015	March 23: Anti Corruption Day		
2017	Chakravarthy	Doctor	
2017	Psycho Shankra		
2018	Ramadhanya	Raghav, Kanaka Dasa, Rama	Triple role
2018	Chitte		
2019	Kurukshetra	Sahadeva	
2019	Odeya	Vijayendra	
2022	Triple Riding		
2023	Garadi	Garadi Soori	
