= Mr. Bachelor =

Indian romantic drama film

- Theatrical release poster
- Directed by: Naidu Bandaaru
- Produced by: Srinivas L. Hanumanth Rao; Swarnalatha D.
- Starring: Darling Krishna; Nimika Ratnakar; Milana Nagaraj
- Cinematography: Sri Crazy Mindz
- Edited by: Sri Crazy Mindz
- Music by: Manikanth Kadri
- Production companies: Milind Raso Studios; Sri Chandra Productions
- Release date: 6 January 2023
- Running time: 145 minutes
- Country: India
- Language: Kannada

Mr. Bachelor is a 2023 Indian Kannada-language romantic drama film directed by Naidu Bandaaru and starring Darling Krishna, Nimika Ratnakar, and Milana Nagaraj.

== Cast ==
- Darling Krishna as Karthik
- Nimika Ratnakar as Pallavi
- Milana Nagaraj as Pallavi
- Chikkanna as Chikku
- Giri Shivanna as Giri
- Ayyappa P. Sharma
- Yash Shetty
- Pavitra Lokesh

== Soundtrack ==
The music was composed by Manikanth Kadri.

Track listing
No.	Title	Lyrics	Singer(s)	Length
1.	"Mr. Bachelor Title Song"	Maruthi T	Vijay Prakash, Chirayu (rap)	3:57
2.	"Subbalakshmi"	Chethan Kumar	All Ok	3:43
3.	"Rasika Baaro"	V. Nagendra Prasad	Supriya Lohith	3:27
Total length:				11:07

== Reception ==
A critic from The New Indian Express wrote that "A significant part of Krishna’s role reminds us of his own Love Mocktail series. He brings in all-around entertainment and also gets to showcase a bit of his dancing skills". A critic from Deccan Herald wrote that "Darling Krishna appears natural in romantic comedies but he soon needs to find the right scripts". A critic from The Times of India wrote that "Mr Bachelor is the latest in a streak of romantic comedies for Darling Krishna, which has become his forte. This film touches on the question of relationships and marriage, while throwing in some thriller elements".
