= Shishira (film) =

- Directed by: Manju Swaraj
- Written by: Manju Swaraj
- Produced by: B Mahadev; BT Manju
- Starring: Yashas; Prema
- Cinematography: Suresh Babu
- Edited by: K M Prakash
- Music by: B. Ajaneesh Loknath
- Production companies: Mahashaila Cine Sankula; CMB Ventures
- Release date: 25 December 2009
- Country: India
- Language: Kannada

Shishira is a 2009 Indian Kannada-language crime drama film directed by debutante Manju Swaraj and starring Yashas Surya and Prema. It also stars veteran actress Prema in an important role. The movie is based on the 2004 movie 1408.

== Cast ==
- Yashas Surya as Suraj
- Prema
- Meghana as Sonu
- Santhosh
- Athaib as Athai
- Baby Sampriya
- Baby Surabhya
- Ashish
- Tenjin

== Production ==
The entire film takes place in 12 hours. To prepare for his character of a college student who eventually becomes mentally affected, Yashas Surya spent two days at NIMHANS.

== Soundtrack ==
Shishira

Soundtrack album by B. Ajaneesh Loknath
- Released: 2009
- Genre: Film soundtrack
- Producer: B.MAHADEV

B. Ajaneesh Loknath chronology
Shishira (2009)	Varshadhare (2010)

B. Ajaneesh Loknath has scored the music.

No.	Song title	Singers	Lyrics	Length
1	"Elliruve Hegiruve"	K. S. Chithra	K. Kalyan	04:57
2	"Tumbu Hunnimeyali"	K. S. Chithra	Krishnegowda	03:45
3	"Vidyege Dasanagu"	B. Ajaneesh Loknath, Chaitra H. G.	Nagathihalli Chandrashekar	05:25
4	"Ello Ello"	Vijay Yesudas	Manju Swaraj	03:39
5	"Kamana Bille"	Harshika Devanathan, Baby Rakshita Bhaskar	Krishnegowda	04:42
6	"Kamana Bille" (female)	Lakshmi Manmohan	Krishnegowda	04:41

== Reception ==
=== Critical response ===
R. G. Vijayasarathy of Rediff.com scored the film at 3.5 out of 5 stars and wrote "Yashas, who has acted earlier in Yuga Yugagale Saagali, comes out with a brilliant performance. He is definitely a talent to watch out for. Prema, who returns to the film industry after a while, fills the role perfectly. The tall Santosh is quite frightening in the film. Meghana and the other artistes are impressive. Go and watch Shishira". B S Srivani from the Deccan Herald wrote "Ajanish Lokanath’s tunes have a part in this. Perhaps, this was what the director had intended. ‘Shishira’ is a slick film technically and story-wise as well. It doesn't scare people. Experience and patience will definitely help Manju". A critic from the Bangalore Mirror wrote "You are hardly ever scared by the ghosts that appear. The quick narrative does not seem special in the absence of excitement. The film is a commendable effort and a decent watch but is short of being stimulating". A critic from Sify.com wrote "Yashas has the looks and struggled hard to make it convincing. Prema in her come back is not impressive. The brilliant thing about the film is the Suresh Babu['s] Camera work, special effects and Ajanish Lokanth two lovely tunes and the background score done for the film".
