= Happy New Year (2017 film) =

- Theatrical Poster
- Directed by: Pannaga Bharana
- Screenplay by: Pannaga Bharana; Athi Sankar; Avinash Balekkala
- Story by: Pannaga Bharana
- Produced by: Vanaja Patil
- Starring: B. C. Patil; Saikumar; Rajshri Ponnappa; Vijay Raghavendra; Diganth; Dhananjay; Sudharani
- Cinematography: Shreesha Kuduvalli
- Edited by: Deepu S. Kumar
- Music by: Raghu Dixit
- Production company: Soumya Films
- Release date: May 5, 2017
- Country: India
- Language: Kannada

Happy New Year is a 2017 Indian Kannada anthology film directed by Pannaga Bharana and featuring an ensemble cast consisting of B. C. Patil, Saikumar, Rajshri Ponnappa, Vijay Raghavendra, Diganth, Dhananjay, Sudharani, Shruthi Hariharan, Sonu Gowda, Margarita, and Srushti Patil in the lead roles. The film's music is composed by Raghu Dixit. The principal photography commenced on 22 August 2016, and the film was released on 5 May 2017.

== Synopsis ==
The movie revolves around five stories interwoven. Raghavendra (Vijaya Raghavendra) is a police constable who is struggling to make time with his daughter, Pranathi, and wife, Suma (Sonu Gowda). He is unhappy with his job. Harsha (Diganth) is an IT professional who goes on a vacation and falls in love with Vismaya who is an ardent believer of science. Venkatramana Bhat (P. Sai Kumar) is a car showroom head and Varalaxmi (Sudha Rani), his wife, are a childless couple. Venkatramana Bhat is unhappy with his orthodox wife. Danny (Dhananjaya) is an RJ who loves Charvi who is bedridden due to a terminal disease. Danny tries hard to save her. Kourava (B. C. Patil) is an underworld Don who is released from jail and finds love. All the characters are in search of meaning in their life. New Year brings a big change in their lives.

== Cast ==
- B. C. Patil as Kourava
- Saikumar as Venkatramana Bhat
- Vijay Raghavendra as Raghavendra
- Diganth as Harsha
- Dhananjaya as Danny
- Margarita as Esther
- Sudharani as Varalakshmi
- Sonu Gowda as Suma
- Srusti Patil as Vismaya
- Shruthi Hariharan as Charvi
- Rajshri Ponnappa as Disha
- Tabla Nani as Drunkard
- Chandru as Credit kanakadasa
- RJ Siri as Siri
- Master Vishwas as Battery
- Baby Aninditha as Pranathi
- Gurunandan Bhat K as Chandru
- Jay D'Souza as Karthik

Cameo appearances in "Party Anthem" promotional song (in order of appearance)

- Raghu Dixit
- Krishi Thapanda
- Manvitha Kamath
- Chiranjeevi Sarja
- Shubra Aiyappa
- Prajwal Devaraj

== Soundtrack ==
The songs and background score for the film are composed by Raghu Dixit. The audio was launched on 20 February 2017 at the KSC Stadium in Bangalore. Actor Sudeep officially launched the album.

No.	Title	Lyrics	Singer(s)	Length
1.	"Adda Bidde"		Raghu Dixit
2.	"Sa Re Ga Ma Pa Da Ni"		Nakul Abhyankar
3.	"Baduke Neenentha Nataka"		Kapil Nair
4.	"Preethiya Hesare Neenu"		Vasuki Vaibhav, Raghavendra V Kamath
5.	"Kaurava (Theme)"		Master Vishwas, Nakul Abhyankar
6.	"Preethiya Hesare Neenu (Unplugged)"		Vasuki Vaibhav, Raghavendra V Kamath
7.	"The Party Anthem"	Rahul Dit-O (rap lyrics only)	Raghu Dixit, Nakul Abhyankar, Sujay Harthi, Nikhil P Sarathy, Inchara Rao, Apoorva Sridhar, Aishwarya Rangarajan (Rap verse by Rahul Dit-O)

== Reception ==
Sunayana Suresh of Times of india rated 3.5 out of 5 and stated that "The film is definitely worth that summer vacation watch, which you can watch with either your entire family or your special someone". Shyam Prasad S of Bangalore Mirror rated 3.5 out of 5 star and wrote that "Overall the film is a neat little package of a bit of everything. It is a slice of life from characters from different sections of the city".
