= The Stone Boy (TV series) =

Indian children's television series

The Stone Boy is an Indo-Mauritius short film broadcast as a children's television series that aired on the Indian television channel DD National in 1991. It was directed by T.S. Nagabharana. The story was based on a fantasy story of a poor farmer/milkman boy who was cursed by fairies.

== Plot ==
Ajith and his sister Archana have to shift to a new country as their father's job gets transferred for a year to write about the history of Mauritius. They get admitted to a new school. Initially they find it difficult to befriend their new classmates and end up fighting with Bholu and his group. They seem envious of Ajit and are not ready to accept him and try to bully him always. During a school mountain trekking event Ajit learns of a mountain called Stone Boy as a big stone on the top of the mountain resembles a rock. The rumors were that whosoever goes to the mountain vanishes. During that night, Ajit climbs that mountain and sings a song "Aaa gaya hoon paas tere, chod ke sab yaar mere, karle mujhse dosti, Stone Boy". Miraculously a friendly boy appears in front. The stone boy immediately befriends Ajit and informs him that he had been cursed and every 50 years he would appear for only three days only by a call from the true heart of friendship. Ajit asks Stone boy about his story and Stone boy recites that a long, long time ago his name was Dhinu and he was the son of a poor farmer/milkman. He was very wise. He owned a cow and selling that cow's milk was his only source of income. Every day he used to milk his cow and went selling that milk. One day when he was returning home from his business, he saw a group of very beautiful fairies who were dancing and singing. He saw their whole "leela" by hiding behind a large stone. Eventually a fairy happened to see him. The head of the fairies got very angry and gives order to kill the stone boy. But the poor boy pleads for forgiveness. One of the fairies feels pity on him, and asks for forgiveness from the head fairy. As the curse could not be taken back thus the Head fairy asks stone boy to make a promise of not telling about the fairies to anyone and that would in turn give him riches else he would turn into stone and only once in 50 years for three days he would turn back to life. The fairy says "From now onward, you will get prosperous. All your problems will get solved. But only while you keep this secret that we fairies visit this place on earth. You shall have to keep this secret. If you ever tell this to anyone, all your prosperity will be lost and you will get transformed into a stone. You can only appear on being called as a normal human being once in fifty years, for just three days. After three days of your coming back to humans you shall again be transformed into stone for another fifty years waiting for someone to call you. This would be your punishment for not keeping our secret."

As days pass Dhinu starts getting rich as his cow starts giving more milk. This makes the villagers jealous and envious of Dhinu and family. The villagers decide to find the truth. One day during his return from work Dhinu is stopped by the villagers and they threaten to beat him and his family. Fearing this Dhinu starts telling the truth about fairies and no sooner than he utters the secret his body is transformed into a stone of arbitrary shape. That mountain has been called the Stone Boy ever since. The stone boy then informs Ajit that only Ajit can see and hear him.

Ajit takes stone boy home where stone boy finishes up the entire ration of the house as he was very hungry. The next day Ajit and stone boy visit the supermarket and later that day Ajit introduces stone boy to his sister as well. The next day in the school Ajit is challenged for a football match by Bholu where stone boy helps Ajit to win.

They enjoy the day at the beach where Stone boy takes them to the caves where antique items were lying. Ajit and Archana take an ancient bell home which is later noticed by their father. Their father later finds out from his colleagues that the bell was a part of a treasure-laden ship Solomon which was lost at sea.

Later that day stone boy shows the treasure to Ajit and friends and asks them to use the treasure to build a heaven for the kids. They are followed by Bholu who traps them in that cave. Stone boy helps all to come out and realizes that his three days are over and he must return to the top of the mountain or else he will turn into ash. Ajit and friends assist the stone boy to go to the top of the mountain and he is losing his strength. They are followed by Bholu and his friends who try to stop them. Bholu mistakenly falls into a swamp and is drowning. Hearing his shouts the stone boy helps Bholu and saves his life. Bholu realizes his mistake and takes the stone boy to the top of the mountain along with Ajit. The stone boy bids farewell to all and hands over his flute to Ajit as a token of friendship. The Stone boy turns into stone. Ajit and friends tell the truth about the stone boy to their parents who do not believe it.

After another 50 years, the granddaughter of Ajith, again calls the Stone Boy on the same mountain and he returns to life and reunites with Ajith, Archana and Ajith's granddaughter.

== Cast ==
- Manjunath as Ajit
- Neha Contractor as Archana
- Shridhar as Ashok, Ajit and Archana's father
- Ankur Zaveri as Stone Boy
- Rajesh Chand as the Bholu
- Parikshit Ambatkar as Vijay
- Dinesh Chand as Gopi
