= Srinivasa Murthy (voice actor) =

Indian dubbing artist (1972–2023)

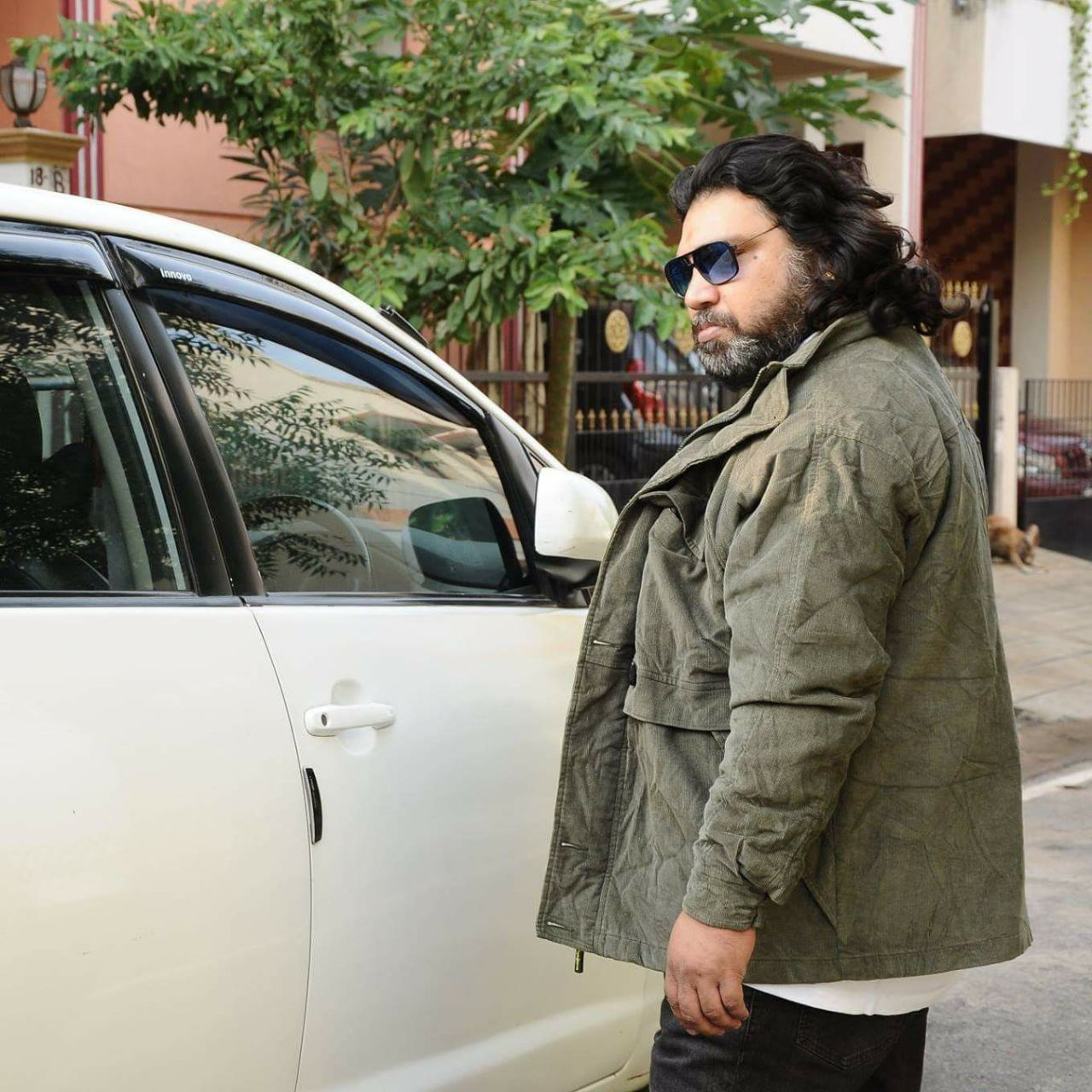
- Murthy in 2017
- Born: 9 May 1972
- Died: 27 January 2023 (aged 50); Chennai, Tamil Nadu, India
- Occupation: Dubbing artist
- Father: A. V. N. Murthy
- Awards: Nandi Award

A. Srinivasa Murthy (9 May 1972 – 27 January 2023) was an Indian dubbing artist, who primarily worked in Telugu cinema. He was born in Vijayawada. Over a career spanning nearly three decades, he provided voices for over 3,000 films, dubbing for prominent Indian and international actors in Telugu versions of their films.

Murthy lent his voice to actors, including Vikram, Ajith, Hrithik Roshan, Rajasekhar, and Upendra in multiple films and was particularly known for dubbing Suriya’s character in the Singam film series. He was recognized for his versatility in adapting to a wide range of characters and tones. In 1998, he received a Nandi Award for his dubbing work in the film Sivayya.

== Career ==
A. Srinivasa Murthy was the son of A. V. N. Murthy, a playback singer and dubbing artist. Murthy began his career as a model at the age of three and continued until he was fifteen. Encouraged by his father, he transitioned to voice-overs for radio and television commercials.

In the early 1990s, Murthy entered the film-dubbing industry with the guidance of writer Sri Ramakrishna, initially dubbing for supporting roles. His first notable work was in Mani Ratnam's Donga Donga (1993), where he dubbed for actor Prashanth. He subsequently dubbed for Sunil Shetty in Anth (1994) and Rajasekhar in Omkaram (1997).

Murthy became a key figure in Tamil films dubbed into Telugu, lending his voice to actors including Vineeth and Abbas. Over the years, he provided dubbing for most-prominent Tamil actors in Telugu cinema, with the exceptions of Rajinikanth and Kamal Haasan. His notable contributions included dubbing for Arjun in Oke Okkadu (1999); Suriya in the Singam series, Ghajini (2005), and 24 (2016); Vikram in Aparichithudu (2005); Ajith Kumar in Gambler (2011), Vivekam (2017), and Viswasam (2019). He also dubbed for Mohanlal in Janatha Garage (2016); and Jayaram in Ala Vaikunthapurramuloo (2020).

In addition to South Indian cinema, Murthy dubbed for Bollywood actors including Shah Rukh Khan, Salman Khan, and Hrithik Roshan, including the Krrish series. He also contributed to Hollywood films dubbed in Telugu, lending his voice to Daniel Craig in James Bond films and to the character Shere Khan in Disney's The Jungle Book (2016).

Murthy was known for his ability to adapt to a wide range of roles, dubbing for heroes, villains, and supporting characters with equal ease. He was recognized for his versatility in handling varying vocal pitches and tones, which established him as a prominent dubbing artist in the Telugu film industry.

In addition to his dubbing work, Murthy appeared in a few Telugu films in character roles. Over his career, he dubbed for more than 3,000 films. He received several accolades, including the Nandi Award in 1998 for his work dubbing Rajasekhar's role in Sivayya. His final contribution as a dubbing artist was for R. Madhavan’s Rocketry: The Nambi Effect (2022).

== Death ==
Srinivasa Murthy died on 27 January 2023 at his residence in Chennai following cardiac arrest. He had previously undergone bypass surgery. He was survived by his son, who, at Murthy's death, resided in France, and a daughter.

== Filmography ==
Year	Title	Voiced for	Language	Notes	Ref
1993	Donga Donga	Prashanth	Telugu (dubbed)		
1994	Anth	Sunil Shetty	Telugu (dubbed)		
1997	Omkaram	Rajasekhar	Telugu		
1997	Pelli	Vadde Naveen	Telugu		
1998	A	Upendra	Telugu (dubbed)		
1999	Oke Okkadu	Arjun	Telugu (dubbed)		
1999	Upendra	Upendra	Telugu (dubbed)		
1999	Premanuragam	Saif Ali Khan	Telugu (dubbed)		
2000	Sakhi	Madhavan	Telugu (dubbed)		
2000	Sivayya	Rajasekhar	Telugu		
2001	Raa	Upendra	Telugu		
2002	Seshu	Rajasekhar	Telugu		
2003	12 Va Anthasthu	Ajay Devgan	Telugu (dubbed)		
2005	Aparichithudu	Vikram	Telugu (dubbed)		
2005	Ghajini	Suriya	Telugu (dubbed)		
2005	Aaru	Suriya	Telugu (dubbed)		
2005	Aaru	Ashish Vidyarthi	Tamil		
2006	Krrish	Hrithik Roshan	Telugu (dubbed)		
2006	Dhoom 2	Hrithik Roshan	Telugu (dubbed)		
2007	Singamalai	Arjun Sarja	Telugu (dubbed)		
2008	Iron Man	Robert Downey Jr.	Telugu (dubbed)		
2008	The Dark Knight	Christian Bale Heath Ledger	Telugu (dubbed) Tamil (dubbed)	for Bale in Telugu and Ledger in Tamil	
2008	Kuruvi	G. V. Sudhakar Naidu	Tamil		
2010	Yamudu	Suriya	Telugu (dubbed)	Telugu dubbed of Singam	
2010	Iron Man 2	Robert Downey Jr.	Telugu (dubbed)		
2011	Transformers: Dark of the Moon	Peter Cullen	Telugu (dubbed)		
2011	Gambler	Ajith Kumar	Telugu (dubbed)		
2012	The Avengers	Robert Downey Jr.	Telugu (dubbed)		
2012	The Dark Knight Rises	Christian Bale	Telugu (dubbed)		
2012	Skyfall	Daniel Craig	Telugu (dubbed)		
2013	Yamudu 2	Suriya	Telugu (dubbed)		
2013	Iron Man 3	Robert Downey Jr.	Telugu (dubbed)		
2013	The Wolverine	Hugh Jackman	Telugu (dubbed)		
2013	Krrish 3	Hrithik Roshan	Telugu (dubbed)		
2014	Transformers: Age of Extinction	Peter Cullen	Telugu (dubbed)		
2014	Bang Bang!	Hrithik Roshan	Telugu (dubbed)		
2014	Veeram	Pradeep Rawat	Tamil		
2015	Avengers: Age of Ultron	Robert Downey Jr.	Telugu (dubbed)		
2016	The Jungle Book	Shere Khan	Telugu (dubbed)		
2016	Captain America: Civil War	Robert Downey Jr.	Telugu (dubbed)		
2016	24	Suriya	Telugu (dubbed)		
2016	Janatha Garage	Mohanlal	Telugu		
2017	Kaabil	Hrithik Roshan	Telugu (dubbed)		
2017	Yamudu 3	Suriya	Telugu (dubbed)		
2017	Spider-Man: Homecoming	Robert Downey Jr.	Telugu (dubbed)		
2017	Vivekam	Ajith Kumar	Telugu (dubbed)		
2018	Avengers: Infinity War	Robert Downey Jr.	Telugu (dubbed)		
2018	Saamy	Vikram	Telugu (dubbed)		
2019	Viswasam	Ajith Kumar	Telugu (dubbed)		
2019	Avengers: Endgame	Robert Downey Jr.	Telugu (dubbed)		
2019	Spider-Man: Far From Home	Robert Downey Jr.	Telugu (dubbed)		
2020	Ala Vaikunthapurramuloo	Jayaram	Telugu	also for Tamil dubbed version	
2021	Mookuthi Amman	Ajay Ghosh	Tamil		
2022	KGF: Chapter 2	Sanjay Dutt	Tamil (dubbed)		
2022	Rocketry: The Nambi Effect	R. Madhavan	Telugu (dubbed)		
2023	Veera Simha Reddy	Nandamuri Balakrishna	Tamil (dubbed)		
2023	Varisu	R. Sarathkumar	Telugu (dubbed)		
2023	Thunivu	Ajith Kumar	Telugu (dubbed)		
