= Nandi Awards of 1997 =

Indian Telugu film and TV awards ceremony

Nandi Awards presented annually by Government of Andhra Pradesh. First awarded in 1964.

== 1997 Nandi Awards Winners List ==
Category	Winner	Film
Best Feature Film	K. Raghavendra Rao	AnnamaYYA
Second Best Feature Film	Krishna Vamsi	Sindhooram
Third Best Feature Film	Akkineni Kutumba Rao	Thodu
