= Garadi (film) =

- Theatrical release poster
- Directed by: Yogaraj Bhat
- Screenplay by: Yogaraj Bhat
- Story by: Vikas YB
- Produced by: Vanaja Patil
- Starring: Yashas Surya; B. C. Patil; Sonal Monteiro; P. Ravishankar
- Cinematography: Niranjan Babu
- Edited by: Suresh Urs
- Music by: V. Harikrishna
- Production company: Soumya Films
- Distributed by: Kourava Production House
- Release date: 10 November 2023
- Country: India
- Language: Kannada

Garadi (transl. Wrestling Competition) is a 2023 Indian Kannada-language sports drama film directed and co-written by Yogaraj Bhat and produced by Vanaja Patil. The film stars Yashas Surya and B. C. Patil in the lead roles, while Sonal Monteiro, Sujay Belur, P. Ravishankar and Tejaswini Prakash appear in pivotal roles. Darshan makes a special appearance in the film. The music is composed by V. Harikrishna, while the cinematography and editing were handled by Niranjan Babu and Suresh Urs.

Garadi revolves around the traditional sport of wrestling set in old Mysore and was shot in a span of 70 days.

Garadi was released on 10 November 2023, coinciding with Diwali, and received mixed reviews from critics.

== Premise ==
Garadi Soori lives in a village called Rattehalli and aspires to become a wrestler, but is forbidden by his teacher Rangappa due to his father Bande Seena and brother Shankara's criminal record. Despite this, Soori trains himself in wrestling by observing Rangappa and tries to achieve his goal despite facing obstacles from Shivappa Rane, who was responsible for Seena's death.

== Cast ==
- Yashas Surya as Garadi Soori
- B. C. Patil as Rangappa
- Sonal Monteiro as Puppy Sukanya alias Kabbali
- P. Ravishankar as Shivappa Rane
- Sujay Belur as Pramod Simha Rane, Shivappa's son
- Tejaswini Prakash
- Raghu
- Dharmanna Kadur as Baovva
- Cheluvaraj
- Prithvi Shamanur
- Nayana Sharath
- S. T. Somashekhar
- Darshan as Shankara, Soori's brother (cameo appearance)
- Nishvika Naidu as a dancer in "Hodirale Halagi"

== Soundtrack ==
V. Harikrishna composed the soundtrack and background score, while the lyrics were written by Yogaraj Bhat.

=== Track listing ===
Track listing
No.	Title	Singer(s)	Length
1.	"Badavana Hrudaya"	Vijay Prakash
2.	"Hodirale Halagi"	Meghana Haliyal
3.	"Garadi Title track"	V. Harikrishna; Shashank Sheshagiri; Aniruddha Sastry; Santhosh Venky; Chetan Sosca; Madhwesh Bharadwaj; Vishak Nagalapura; Hrushikesh B. R. Abhishek M. R. Narahari Achar

== Reception ==
=== Critical response ===
Vinay Lokesh of The Times of India gave 3/5 stars and wrote "Wrestling remains the core of Garadi, but a predictable, lackluster storyline and linear pattern of storytelling nullifies its impact. If you are a die hard fan of wrestling, this movie will certainly impress you." Sujay B. M. of Deccan Herald gave 3/5 stars and wrote "Garadi is an important film on a traditional sport in the days of gym and drugs. Watch it to relive the past but don't expect the book to be as grand as the cover."

A. Sharadhaa of The New Indian Express gave 3/5 stars and wrote "Garadi makes for a wholesome film blending action, romance, and comedy, along with the sport of wrestling. Whether this film gives a boost to Soorya’s career as an actor is a question that remains to be answered. And the audience is left to wonder if Yogaraj Bhat will stick to his signature romantic drama.? Time shall answer." Swaroop Kodur of OTTplay gave 2/5 stars and wrote "Garadi, as already pointed out, may not deliver on the expectations that you carry for a Yogaraj Bhat film but even otherwise, the film feels riddled with problems. You may want to give it a try to get a taste of how traditional wrestling functions in the heartland of Karnataka but the expectations are to be set quite low."

Shuklaji of The News Minute wrote "Garadi, unfortunately, can be best described as an outdated film that has very little to offer, despite boasting a unique premise. One emerges from the theatre wishing to see Yogaraj Bhat return to his old ways but not without the creative risks he is required to take, especially when Kannada cinema is showing signs of a great bloom." Vivek M. V. of The Hindu wrote "Director Yogaraj Bhat’s ‘Garadi,’ starring Yashas Soorya in the lead, is a generic film that does very little to make us care for a dying sport."
