= Dhill =

2001 Indian film by Dharani

- Theatrical release poster
- Directed by: Dharani
- Screenplay by: Dharani
- Dialogues by: Bharathan
- Story by: Dharani
- Produced by: T. Ajaykumar
- Starring: Vikram; Laila; Ashish Vidyarthi
- Narrated by: P. Ravi Shankar (climax)
- Cinematography: S. Gopinath
- Edited by: B. Lenin; V. T. Vijayan
- Music by: Vidyasagar
- Production company: Sree Lakshmi Productions
- Distributed by: Omm Divya LTD Siddhanta Mahapatra
- Release date: 20 July 2001
- Running time: 158 minutes
- Country: India
- Language: Tamil

Dhill (transl. Guts/Courage) is a 2001 Indian Tamil-language action film written and directed by Dharani. The film stars Vikram in the lead role, alongside Laila, Ashish Vidyarthi, Nassar and Vivek in supporting roles. The music was composed by Vidyasagar, while cinematography and editing were handled by S. Gopinath and B. Lenin and V. T. Vijayan.

Dhill was released on 20 July 2001. It received positive reviews and became a commercial success. The film was remade in Telugu as Sreeram (2002), Hindi as Dum (2003), Kannada as Sye (2005), Indian Bengali as Shotrur Mokabila (2002) and in Bangladeshi Bengali as Arman (2002). Dhill was the first film to credit Vikram with the title Chiyaan.

== Plot ==
Kanagavel an aspiring IPS trainee, succeeds in clearing the exams. After having dinner at a restaurant with his girlfriend Asha and while paying the bill, Inspector Encounter Shankar behaves indecently with Asha, but is severely beaten by Kanagavel. Upon learning this, the Chief of Police Training Academy tells Kanagavel that Shankar is an egoistic, corrupt police officer who uses his powers for illegal activities. The Chief reveals that Shankar, along with minister Vedhanayagam and goon Aadhi Bhagavan, alias Adi, were responsible for his daughter's death. His wife, Arathi, losing her sanity as she witnessed Aadhi Bhagavan killing his rival, and she had only came forward to testify in the court.

Learning this, Kanagavel decides to end Shankar's threat once and for all. However, Shankar already goes on the offensive by killing Kanagavel's friend Ashok with the help of Adi. Kanagavel retaliates by attacking Shankar, where he kills Adi with Shankar's gun stolen by him, making everybody believe that Shankar gunned Adi in retaliation. Shankar kills Vedanayagam and frames Kanagavel for the crime. However, it is revealed that Adi's death was faked and that he is actually in Kanagavel's captivity. Unaware of this, Shankar manages to launch a massive manhunt against Kanagavel. Upon learning that Adi is still alive, Shankar springs into action to track down Adi, Kanagavel and Asha.

Shankar traces the trio, and a shootout occurs, where Adi gets fatally injured. Taking advantage of the situation, Shankar tries to corner and kill Kanagavel. On his deathbed, Adi confesses all his crimes to Asha, who records the confession. The police commissioner arrives at the crime scene, where Asha gives him his dying confession. With Shankar's real face exposed, the commissioner orders Kanagavel and Shankar to surrender. Shankar tries to escape, but Kanagavel tracks him down and kills him. Kanagavel surrenders to the court, but he is released based on evidence and is made to join the IPS.

== Cast ==
- Vikram as ACP Kanagavel IPS
- Laila as Asha (Voice dubbed by Sreeja Ravi)
- Ashish Vidyarthi as Inspector "Encounter" Shankar (Voice dubbed by P. Ravi Shankar)
- Nassar as R. Mahendran, Chief of Police Training Academy
- FEFSI Vijayan as Aadhi Bhagavan
- Vivek as "Chinnathirai Singam" Megaserial Mahadevan, Kanagavel's friend
- Rajasekhar as Subramaniam, Kanagavel's father
- Kalairani as Lakshmi, Kanagavel's mother
- Deepa Venkat as Selvi, Kanagavel's sister
- Akash as Sekhar, Kanagavel's brother-in-law & Asha's brother
- Vijaya Bharathi as Shanthi, R. Mahendran's wife
- Sukran as Ashok, Kanagavel's friend
- Mayilsamy as Ezhumalai, Kanagavel's friend
- Pandu as Constable Sudalairaja
- Vaiyapuri as Udumalai, Kanagavel's friend
- Mohan Raj as Minister Vedhanayagam
- Charuhasan as Minister Subbaiya
- MRK as Advocate Perumal
- R. N. R. Manohar
- Crane Manohar as Mani
- Karnaa Radha
- Manikka Vinayagam
- Alphonsa in an item number ("Machan Meesai")
- Priyanka Robo Shankar as Cooking show anchor (uncredited)

== Production ==
Vikram, after the success of the critically acclaimed Sethu, chose to sign on to appear in an action film directed by his Loyola College classmate Dharani. The director had previously worked under the name of Ramani and had made the Mammootty starrer Ethirum Pudhirum in 1999. The film was initially titled as Kanagavel after the lead character, before being renamed to Dhill. To appear trim in the role of the aspiring police officer, Vikram went on a strict diet eating only fruits and drinking juice. He revealed that for the film when bulking, he was on 25 egg whites and one whole cooked chicken a day and also employed a body builder to train him.

Vikram often helped out during the shooting of the film by helping suggest changes to scenes. The film also marked the Tamil debut of Hindi actor Ashish Vidyarthi, who has since gone on to appear in several other prominent films. The actor had to wear prosthetic make-up for the film, noting that it took over one hour to put on.

== Soundtrack ==
The music was composed by Vidyasagar and consists of 5 songs.

Dhill

Soundtrack album by Vidyasagar
- Released: 2001
- Recorded: 2001
- Genre: Soundtrack
- Length: 24:01
- Labels: Hit Musics; Saregama
- Producer: Vidyasagar

Vidyasagar chronology
Randam Bhavam (2001)	Dhill (2001)	Alli Thandha Vaanam (2001)
External audio
- Dhill - Audio Jukebox on YouTube

Track list
No.	Title	Lyrics	Singer(s)	Length
1.	"Dhill Dhill"	Pa. Vijay	Timmy, Sriram Parthasarathy, Ranjith	4:08
2.	"Kannukulle"	Arivumathi	Manikka Vinayagam	4:45
3.	"Machan Meesai"	Pa. Vijay	Pushpa Anand	4:51
4.	"Oh Nanbane"	Arivumathi	Karthik, Tippu, K.S.Chithra	5:25
5.	"Un Samayal Arayil"	Kabilan	P. Unnikrishnan, Sujatha Mohan	4:52
Total length:				24:01

== Release ==
The Hindu stated that "Vikram has the ability and potential" and that "Vikram has once again proved that his success in Sethu was not a fluke". Ayappa Prasad from Screen Magazine wrote that " Dhill stands out for its convincing storyline and a good performance by Vikram who has strained a lot to be a good action hero who can also emote". Dhill became Vikram's first success in the masala film genre and led the way for more such films in the same genre for him.

Dhill won six Tamil Nadu State Film Awards for 2001 with Vidyasagar winning the Best Music Director award for his work in Dhill alongside Thavasi and Poovellam Un Vasam. The film also won the Best Male Playback Singer for P. Unnikrishnan, Best Female Playback Singer for Sujatha and the Best Make-up Artist award for Nageswar Rao. Furthermore, dubbing artistes Sai Ravi and Sreeja picked up the Best Male Dubbing Artist and Best Female Dubbing Artist respectively for their work in the film.

The success of Dhill prompted Vikram and Dharani to come together in 2002 for a project titled Dhool, which also went on to do become a large commercial success. Furthermore, to capitulate on the hit pair of Vikram and Laila, a 1997 Malayalam film they had starred in together, Ithu Oru Snehagadha was dubbed and released in Tamil as Thrill.

== Dubbed versions and remakes ==
The film was remade in Telugu as Sreeram (2002), in Bangladesh Bengali as Arman (2002), in Indian Bengali as Shotrur Mokabila (2003), in Hindi as Dum (2003), and in Kannada as Sye (2005). Despite the Hindi remake, the film was dubbed and released in the same language as Meri Aan: Man In Work.
