= Nandi Award for Best Male Dubbing Artist =

Indian film award

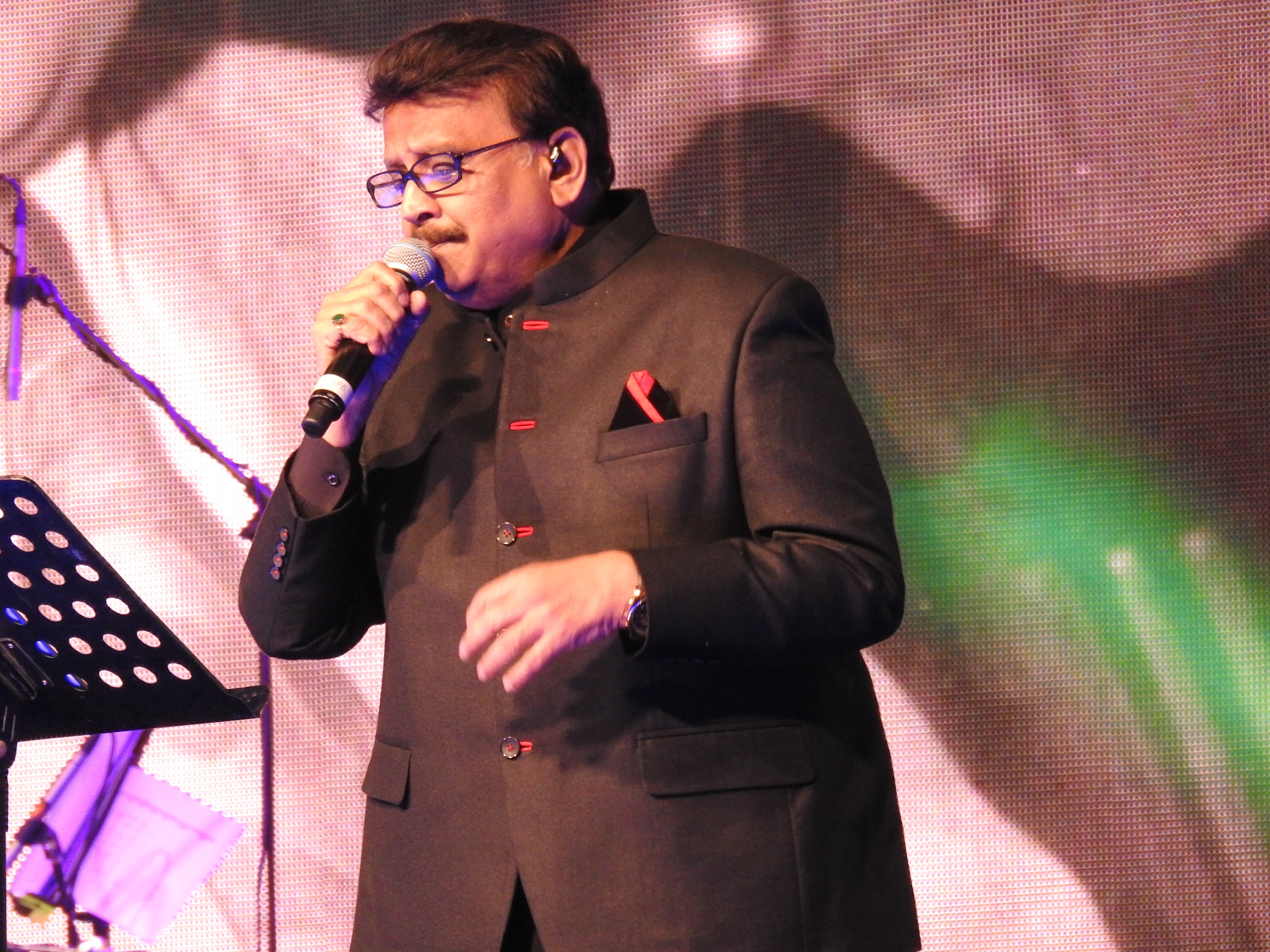
- S.P. Balasubrahmanyam, the first two-time winner in this category

This is the list of Nandi Award for Best Male Dubbing Artist winners since 1996, when the award for this category was instituted.

Year	Artist	Film
1996	Ghantasala Ratnakumar	Tata Manavadu
1997	S.P. Balasubrahmanyam	Annamayya
1998	A. Srinivasa Murthy	Sivayya
1999	P. Ravi Sankar	Prema Katha
2000	S.P. Balasubrahmanyam	Sri Sai Mahima
2001	Raghu	Sampangi
2002	P. Ravi Shankar	Indra
2003	Sivaji	Dil
2004	P. Ravi Shankar	Sye
2005	Jaya Bhaskar	Vuri
2006	P. Ravi Shankar	Pokiri
2007	P. Ravi Shankar	Athidhi
2008	P. Ravi Shankar	Arundhati
2009	P. Ravi Shankar	Anjaneyulu
2010	R.C.M. Raju	Darling
2011	R.C.M. Raju	Poru Telangana
2012	R.C.M. Raju	Minugurulu
2013	P. Ravi Shankar	Attarintiki Daredi
2014	P. Ravi Shankar	Race Gurram
2015	P. Ravi Shankar	Baahubali: The Beginning
2016	Vasu	Arddhanaari
