= Tamil Nadu State Film Award for Best Male Dubbing Artist =

Indian film award

The Tamil Nadu State Film Award for Best Male Dubbing Artist is given by the state government as part of its annual Tamil Nadu State Film Awards for Tamil-language (Kollywood) films.

== The list ==
The award recipients and the films they won for are:

Year	Dubbing Artist	Film	Dubbed For
2015	Gautham Kumar	36 Vayadhinile	
2014	Santhakumar	Nimirndhu Nil	
2013	Kathir	Pandiya Naadu	Sharath Lohitashwa
2012	M. Rajendran	Saguni	Kota Srinivasa Rao
2011	Sai Ravi	Siruthai	Avinash
2010	K. Manohar	Narthagi	
2009	Vinodh	Anthony Yaar?	Lal
2008	M. A. Prakash	Kee Mu	Charan Raj
2007	K. P. Sekhar	Malarinum Melliya	Vignesh
2006	Kathir		
2005	S. N. Surendar	Anniyan	Nedumudi Venu
2004			
2003	M. Rajendran	Saamy	Kota Srinivasa Rao
2002	Murali Kumar	Run	Atul Kulkarni
2001	Sai Ravi	Dhill	Ashish Vidyarthi
2000	Rajeev	Bharathi	Sayaji Shinde

== See also ==
- Tamil cinema
- Cinema of India
