= Prema Katha =

- Directed by: Ram Gopal Varma
- Written by: Vara Prasad Varma (Dialogues)
- Screenplay by: Vara Prasad Varma
- Story by: Vara Prasad Varma
- Produced by: Nagarjuna Akkineni
- Starring: Sumanth; Antara Mali; Manoj Bajpayee; Radhika; Narasimharaju
- Cinematography: Venkat Rama Prasad
- Edited by: Bhanodaya
- Music by: Sandeep Chowta
- Production company: Annapurna Studios
- Distributed by: Annapurna Studios
- Release date: 16 April 1999
- Running time: 123 minutes
- Country: India
- Language: Telugu

Prema Katha (transl. Love Story) is a 1999 Indian Telugu-language romance drama film written directed by Ram Gopal Varma. The director himself, under his legal or writing name Vara Prasad Varma, wrote the film's screenplay, and dialogues. It is the debut film of both Sumanth and Antara Mali as leads in the Telugu film industry. The film opened to positive reviews by critics but was commercially unsuccessful. It had a highly praised soundtrack by Sandeep Chowta including the hit song "Devudu Karunisthaadani". The film bagged six state Nandi Awards and was dubbed into Tamil as Kadhal Vanile.

== Plot ==
Set in a rural backdrop, it is a love story between a poor village boy Suri (Sumanth) and a rich upper-class girl Divya (Antara Mali), much to the opposition of the latter's violent brother, Sankaram (Manoj Bajpayee).

== Cast ==
- Sumanth as Suri
- Antara Mali as Divya
- Manoj Bajpayee as Sankaram
- Radhika as Subhadra, Suri's mother
- Giri Babu as Janaki Ramaiah
- Annapoorna as Parvatiamma
- Narasimha Raju as Suri's father
- Khayyum as Suri's friend
- Tanish as Subba Rao

== Soundtrack ==
The music was composed by Sandeep Chowta and released by Aditya Music. All lyrics were written by Sirivennela Seetharama Sastry.

Prema Katha

Soundtrack album by Sandeep Chowta
- Released: 8 February 1999
- Recorded: 1999
- Genre: Soundtrack
- Length: 30:21
- Label: Aditya Music
- Producer: Sandeep Chowta

Sandeep Chowta chronology
Shanti Shanti Shanti (1998)	Prema Katha (1999)	Mast (film) (1999)

Track list
No.	Title	Singer(s)	Length
1.	"Devudu Karunisthadani"	Rajesh Krishnan, Anuradha Sriram	4:59
2.	"Changre Hangaama"	Sowmya Raoh	5:00
3.	"Nee Kosam"	Rajesh Krishnan	6:14
4.	"Kokkarako"	Rajesh Krishnan	4:51
5.	"Sunday Sunday"	Mano, K. S. Chithra	4:58
6.	"Prema Sangati Emito"	Sowmya Raoh	4:19
Total length:			30:21

== Awards ==
Nandi Awards - 1999

- Third Best Feature Film - Bronze - Nagarjuna
- Best Director - Ram Gopal Varma
- Best Supporting Actress - Radhika
- Best Male Dubbing Artist - P. Ravi Shankar
- Best Cinematographer - Venkata Prasad
- Best Lyricist - Sirivennela Seetharama Sastry
