= Dandupalya (franchise) =

- Directed by: Srinivas Raju; K. T. Nayak (Dandupalya 4)
- Written by: Srinivas Raju; K. T. Nayak (Dandupalya 4)
- Produced by: Prashanth G. R. (Dandupalya); Girish T. (Dandupalya); Venkat (2, Dandupalya 4); Ram Talluri (3); Prem Kumar Pandey (Thaggedele); N. Akhilesh Reddy (Thaggedele); P. V. Subba Reddy (Thaggedele)
- Starring: Pooja Gandhi; Makarand Deshpande; P. Ravi Shankar; Ravi Kale; Shruti (2, 3); Sanjjanaa (2, 3); Suman Ranganathan (Dandupalya 4)
- Cinematography: Venkat Prasad; Manu Girish (Dandupalya 4)
- Edited by: S. Manohar (Dandupalya); C. Ravichandran (2, 3); Garry BH (Thaggedele)
- Music by: Arjun Janya; Anand Rajavikraman (Dandupalya 4); Charan Arjun (Thaggedele); Chinna (Thaggedele)
- Production companies: Apple Blossom Creations (Dandupalya); Venkaat Movies (2, Dandupalya 4); SRT Entertainers Private Limited (3); Bhadra Productions (Thaggedele)
- Release dates: 29 June 2012 (Dandupalya); 14 July 2017 (2); 16 March 2018 (3); 1 November 2019 (Dandupalya 4); 4 November 2022 (Thaggedele)
- Country: India
- Languages: Kannada; Telugu (Thaggedele)

Dandupalya is an Indian crime thriller film franchise created by Srinivas Raju and is based on a real gang named Dandupalya. The franchise consists of four Kannada-language films and one Telugu-language spin-off film.

== Films ==
The trilogy was directed by Srinivas Raju. The second and third films were shot simultaneously. The third film was considered the conclusion of the series. However, a fourth film was made with Raju and Pooja Gandhi distancing themselves from the film. Raju brought back several characters from the trilogy in the Telugu-language film Thaggedele (2022).

== Cast and characters ==
Characters	Main films				Spin-off film
Characters	Dandupalya	Dandupalya 2	Dandupalya 3	Dandupalya 4	Thaggedele
Lakshmi	Pooja Gandhi	Pooja Gandhi	Pooja Gandhi		Pooja Gandhi
Krishna	Makarand Deshpande	Makarand Deshpande	Makarand Deshpande		Makarand Deshpande
Inspector Chalapathi	P. Ravi Shankar	P. Ravi Shankar	P. Ravi Shankar		P. Ravi Shankar
Chander	Ravi Kale	Ravi Kale	Ravi Kale		Ravi Kale
Chikkmuniya	Kari Subbu	Kari Subbu	Kari Subbu		
Koti Thimma	Jayadev Mohan	Jayadev Mohan	Jayadev Mohan		
Abhivyakthi		Shruti	Shruti		
Chandri		Sanjjanaa	Sanjjanaa		
Jailor		Sathyajith	Sathyajith		
Sundri				Suman Ranganathan	
Eshwar					Naveen Chandra
Devi					Divya Pillai
Liza					Ananya Raj

== Impact ==
The franchise's success inspired other similar films such as Khatarnak (2013).
