= Dandupalya (film) =

- Theatrical film poster
- Directed by: Srinivas Raju
- Written by: Srinivas Raju
- Screenplay by: Srinivas Raju
- Produced by: Prashanth G. R. Girish T.
- Starring: Pooja Gandhi; Ravi Kale; Makarand Deshpande; P. Ravishankar; Raghu Mukherjee
- Cinematography: Venkat Rama Prasad
- Edited by: S. Manohar
- Music by: Arjun Janya
- Production company: Apple Blossom Creations
- Release date: 29 June 2012
- Running time: 152 minutes
- Country: India
- Language: Kannada
- Budget: ₹3 crore
- Box office: est. ₹25 crore

Dandupalya is a 2012 Indian Kannada-language crime film directed by Srinivas Raju and starring Pooja Gandhi, Ravi Kale, Makarand Deshpande, P. Ravishankar and Raghu Mukherjee. The plot is based on the real-life exploits of a notorious gang named Dandupalya. The film was a major commercial success and became one of the highest-grossing Kannada films at the time, being shown for more than 100-days in multiple centres. With Gandhi in the lead, it turned out to be the highest grossing female lead film in Kannada cinema.

The film was the first instalment in the Dandupalya franchise. A sequel to the film, Dandupalya 2, was announced in July 2014 and began production on 24 March 2016. Director Srinivas Raju, music director Arjun Janya, cinematographer Venkat Prasad, and Gandhi all reprised their roles. It released on July 14, 2017, to decent reviews by critics. Dandupalya 3 (2018) was shot simultaneously with part 2, having almost the same cast. Dandupalya 4 directed by K. T. Nayak was released in 2019.

== Plot ==
Note: The names used for the gang members in the movie have not been used in the plot to not hurt the sentiments.

The scene opens with the gang killing a pig for food. One SI comes to them for killing a man in Chittoor, Andhra Pradesh. They agree for a mere ₹3,000. They kill the man, who turns out to be another policeman, by slitting his throat. They join as construction workers with the recommendations of a woman, Lakshmi, where she works. The gang then begin the crime. They spot a home with a lone woman and follow a peculiar pattern: the woman asks for a glass of water to the lone woman in the house and the rest of the gang force enter the home, rape and murder her by slitting her throat, and finally loot the home. On a parallel note, a man living with his sister agrees to marry a girl. They get married and the girl gets pregnant but the girl and the man's sister are raped and murdered in a similar style. The man commits suicide. The gang often get jobs from a corrupt lawyer to commit crimes for him for a small amount.

Inspector Chalapathi is a hard and intelligent cop who does not tolerate crime, especially towards women. The rape-murder-theft continues and it brings considerable pressure on him by seniors and frustrates him as the gang often does not leave a single trace of evidence. He then comes across the case of the man's pregnant wife and sister and from the pattern of killing by throat slitting, he deducts that it is a psycho killing unlike conventional murders. He alerts all the informers of suspicious jewellery selling in local shops. One day, he comes across a case of a looted Durga shrine. From a tip-off by an informant, he catches the squint-eyed gang member selling the stolen items. The temple's priest recognizes Lord Kartikeya's vel and informs the police that it is not from the Durga shrine. The initial suspicion of him being a petty criminal makes Chalapathi believe that he is a part of the Dandupalya gang. The squint-eyed person takes the police to a sleeping gang member, Chander. The squint man, Chander and the inspector go to Lord Kartikeya's temple, which was looted earlier and its two priests murdered. The squinted man explains how they stole the ornaments without the other gang members noticing, who were busy raping and killing the priests. Chalapathi deduces that they are the gang he is looking for.

The woman gang member spots them in the police station where they are kept and the gang go to the corrupt lawyer for help. The lawyer sends a habeas corpus writ to Chalapathi. Chalapathi now conforms that they are indeed a part of the Dandupalya gang as no arrest of common migrant construction workers attracts the writ. He locates the other gang members and with his senior's permission, he takes them to a secluded place for 40 days to get information but they do not speak even after unbearable torture, which included beating Lakshmi naked and clipping off the squint man's whole nails. When the inspector lures them with food, they finally speak up and agree to their crimes.

Chalapathi takes them to court, the corrupt lawyer being their only defence. The judge is provided with the stolen items from the looted temples and a rape survivor as evidence, The rape survivor speaks as a witness. The judge sentences the gang with Chalapathi concluding what follows will be shown in Dandupalya 2.

== Cast ==
- Pooja Gandhi as Lakshmi, the lead gang member
- Ravi Kale as Chander
- Makarand Deshpande as Krishna, gang leader
- P. Ravi Shankar as Inspector Chalapathi
- Raghu Mukherjee as Hari
- Priyanka Kothari as Susheela, Hari's wife
- Jayadev Mohan as Koti Thimma
- Karisubbu as Chikkmuniya
- Muniraju
- Yathiraj as gang member
- Danny Kuttappa as gang member
- Petrol Prasanna as gang member
- Sudharani as Bharathi, wife of Inspector Chalapathi
- Bhavya as Bhavya, Hari's sister
- Doddanna as an Advocate Bhat, the corrupt lawyer
- Ramesh Bhat as Susheela's father
- Chitra Shenoy as Susheela's mother
- Srinivasa Murthy as Lawyer
- Harish Rai as Inspector Prathap
- Prathik
- Bullet Prakash as Muniyappa, a general contractor
- Pradeep Gadhadhar
- Edakallu Gudda Chandrashekhar as Judge
- Sanketh Kashi as constable

== Production ==
Pooja Gandhi was asked to do the female lead in this film as Lakshmi, the leader of the infamous Dandupalya gang. She agreed to do the role reluctantly, because of potential negative talk in the Kannada film industry regarding such female characters.

== Soundtrack ==
Dandupalya

Soundtrack album by Arjun Janya
- Released: 18 June 2012
- Genre: Feature film soundtrack
- Length: 56:30
- Language: Kannada
- Label: Sai Audio

Track listing
| No. | Title | Lyrics | Singer(s) | Length |
|---|---|---|---|---|
| 1. | "Aleyo Alegale" | V. Nagendra Prasad | Karthik, Anuradha Bhat | 5:30 |
| 2. | "Kalli Nanu" | V. Nagendra Prasad | Vasundhara Das, Harsha Sadanandam | 5:00 |
| 3. | "Police Theme" | V. Nagendra Prasad | Ravi Basur | 5:30 |
| 4. | "Yaare Neenu" | V. Nagendra Prasad | Nakul, Priya Himesh | 5:00 |
| 5. | "Dandupalya Theme" | V. Nagendra Prasad | Instrumental | 7:00 |
| Total length: | | | | 28:00 |

== Release ==
The film was certified an "A" by the Central Board of Film Certification. It was released across Karnataka on 29 June 2012 with the title name as Dandupalya. However, the Telugu and Tamil versions were released one year later, on 25 Jan 2013 and 24 May 2014 respectively.

== Reception ==
=== Box office ===
The film, along with its dubbed versions collected over ₹25 crore domestically against a production budget of ₹3 crore, and went on to cross over 100-days in multiple centres.

The film was dubbed in Telugu and released as Dandupalyam. It was well received in Andhra Pradesh. The Telugu dubbed version was released with 110 prints and completed a successful 100-days run at Guntur and Ongole in Andhra Pradesh and Telangana.

A Tamil dub titled Karimedu was produced by Rama Narayanan's Sri Thenandal Films and released on 24 May 2013. The film received critical acclaim from critics and audience upon the release. It was also re-released on 3 September 2021.

=== Critical reception ===
A critic from The Times of India scored the film at 3 out of 5 stars and says "Pooja Gandhi walks away with full honours for her excellentperformance as Lakshmi. Makarand Deshapande is amazing. Ravi Kale is brilliant. Ravishankar gives life to his role of police inspector. Music by Arjun Janya and cinematography by Venkat Prasad are added attractions". Srikanth Srinivasa from Rediff.com scored the film at 3 out of 5 stars and wrote "Dandupalya is a spine chilling film that allows you to rewind your memories of the gang that terrorized society some time back. It is horrifying and gory. Go for it to know how the gang operated". Shruti I. L. from DNA wrote "miss out on Pooja’s performance or to find out how this notorious gang was caught by the daring police inspector, Chalapathi. And if you already have watched it, well you now have the sequel to look forward to... Verdict: Watch it for Pooja Gandhi’s performance". A critic from News18 India wrote "but it is Markand Deshpande and Jai Dev who have come out with flying colours. Raghu Mukherjee, Nisha Kothari and Sudharani have filled in their roles adequately. The dialogues are crisp and to the point". B S Srivani from Deccan Herald wrote "Repeats of the gang’s forays, still portraying the police as mean weaklings and the incoherent courtroom dialogue culminating in an ominous climax — take your pick, but Dandupalya doesn’t rise above ribald jokes on wary neighbours and scheming strangers. With a sequel in the offing, more misery is promised". A critic from Bangalore Mirror wrote Dandupalya could have been a gripping crime saga, but it just turns out to be an average tale. If you are game for gore of the voyeuristic kind, go for it. Raju has promised a sequel. Hopefully, it will have more art than fake blood". Y. Sunita Chowdhary reviewing the Telugu version for The Hindu wrote "Over all it is a well-made film technically but one would still wonder if the subject though universal still has a title and content pertaining to Karnataka, would interest the people in Andhra Pradesh. Good effort by Srinivas Raju who succeeds in drawing attention through his first film which is dubbed from Kannada".

Business Standard, Sify.com, News18 India and India TV praised the performance of Pooja Gandhi as the gang leader in the Tamil dubbed version of the film, Karimedu.

== Controversy ==
The film was criticised by social group Bahujan Samaj Horata Samiti, who claimed that its content was offensive. They objected specifically to the film's portrayal of women. Further controversy followed when it was revealed that actress Pooja Gandhi would appear topless in the film. After the release of the film, Ambedkar Kranthi Sena activists demonstrated in Bengaluru against the film's "glorification of anti-social activities".

"According to the dictionary, nudity means that you are not covered with a single item of clothing from head to toe. But in this scene, I have worn a sari and I am trying to cover my body, except for my back" said Gandhi about her controversial scene in the film

== Sequels ==
A sequel to the film was announced in July 2014. Dandupalya 2 began production on 24 March 2016, and it was released on July 14, 2017. Srinivas Raju again directed the film with Gandhi in the lead. Arjun Janya, the music director, and cinematographer Venkat Prasad, also reprised their roles. The film Dandupalya 3 was shot simultaneously with part 2, the second schedule of shooting being held from April 2017. Initially planned to release within a week after part 2, the film however, was pushed for a release on 2 March 2018.

Dandupalya 4 directed by K. T. Nayak released in 2019.

== Legacy ==
The film brought instant fame to Makarand Deshpande in Kannada cinema, and also he was nominated for 2nd South Indian International Movie Awards and Bangalore Times Film Award for Best Actor in a Negative Role for his performance in the film as Krishna. Gandhi also received several awards for her performance as Lakshmi.

== Awards and nominations ==
Awards and nominations
| Award | Wins | Nominations |
| 2nd South Indian International Movie Awards | 1 | 3 |
| Filmfare Awards South | 0 | 1 |
| Bangalore Times Film Awards | 0 | 1 |
| Suvarna Film Awards | 1 | 1 |
- Totals
| Awards won | 2 |
| Nominations | 6 |

=== Awards ===
| Ceremony | Category | Nominee | Result |
|---|---|---|---|
| 2nd South Indian International Movie Awards | Best Actress in a Negative Role | Pooja Gandhi | Won |
| 2nd South Indian International Movie Awards | Best Actor in a Supporting Role | Raghu Mukherjee | Nominated |
| 2nd South Indian International Movie Awards | Best Actor in a Negative Role | Makarand Deshpande | Nominated |
| Suvarna Film Awards | Best Actress | Pooja Gandhi | Won |
| Bangalore Times Film Awards | Best Actor in a Negative Role | Makarand Deshpande | Nominated |
| Filmfare Awards South | Best Actress | Pooja Gandhi | Nominated |
