= Dandupalya 3 =

- Film poster
- Directed by: Srinivas Raju
- Written by: Srinivasa Raju
- Produced by: Ram Talluri
- Starring: Pooja Gandhi; P. Ravishankar; Makarand Deshpande; Ravi Kale
- Cinematography: Venkat Rama Prasad
- Edited by: C. Ravichandran
- Music by: Arjun Janya
- Production company: SRT Entertainers Private Limited
- Release date: 16 March 2018
- Running time: 102 minutes
- Country: India
- Language: Kannada
- Budget: ₹3 crore
- Box office: ₹4.5 crore

Dandupalya 3 (or simply III) is a 2018 Indian Kannada-language crime thriller film directed by Srinivas Raju and produced by Ram Talluri. Based on the infamous dacoit gang from Dandupalya, the film is a sequel to the 2017 critically acclaimed film Dandupalya 2 and is third film in the franchise. The film stars Pooja Gandhi, continuing her role from the prequels and most of the principal cast including P. Ravishankar, Makarand Deshpande, Ravi Kale, Shruti, Petrol Prasanna and Sanjjana reprise their roles from the previous films. The film's score and soundtrack is composed by Arjun Janya and cinematography by Venkat Prasad. The film is dubbed into Telugu language and is entitled Dandupalyam 3. Much of the crew members have been retained for the film from the prequels apart from roping in Naveen Krishna, Tabla Nani, Ramesh and Gururaj Desai to pen the dialogues. The film would mark the end of the franchise.

Most parts of the film were shot simultaneously during the Part 2 filming, while the second schedule of shooting was held from April 2017. Initially planned to release within a week after the Part 2 release, the film however, released on 16 March 2018.

The film opened to mixed reviews from the audience and critics upon the release in both Karnataka and Andhra Pradesh, but earned good collection report from the 'B' and 'C' centres with almost packed houses across the states and emerged as a sleeper hit at box office.

== Plot ==
After Abhivyakti "Abhi's" news creates a sensation, Inspector Chalapathi takes her to the gang and reprimands her. Pointing to Umesh Reddy, he asks in which angle the gang looked innocent. He further explains how crime flowed in their DNA from their ancestors and how their children are trained by their mothers: forcefully beating them up to survive harsh beatings in the future and making them drink donkey's blood to make their bodies strong. The movie now follows the buildup of the gang. When Bengaluru city is developed by integrating the surrounding villages, the children who now form the Dandupalya gang, move to the city.

The female gang member finds a job as a maid despite the objections made by the lady of the house for allowing an unknown to work in the house. After she learns that the family is leaving for a pilgrimage to Tirupati, she informs the gang of this and they plan for their first theft in the city. The following day, she arrives with the gang only to find the girl inside the house. As they argue, the men forcefully enter the house and tie her up. While the other men steal, one man rapes her and others follow. The gang leader (Makarand Deshpande) slits her throat when the gang is afraid of her going to the police. During the struggle for her breath, the girl forcefully breathes which makes further blood come out of her throat, which makes a peculiar hissing sound. This makes him a manic for slitting throats and listening to the sound, thus slitting every victim's throat. They often leave no evidence which frustrates the police.

S.I Chalapathi explains that the success of the gang was due to the negligence of the Police. One night, when the gang leader gets arrested for being drunk, he is taken to the police station where the police discuss how criminals have outgrown police employing several techniques, including wanted getting arrested for petty crimes which serves a dual purpose: it cools off the crime period and the police do not suspect them as they are petty criminals. Further, mingling with the common citizens makes the police divert their attention from them. Overhearing the conversation, the gang implements the same and commits proof-less rapes and murders. This leaves Abhi shocked.

The inspector explains the fake witnesses: when he meets a rape survivor, after initially declining the event, she breaks down and acknowledges. But due to social stigma, she is unable to be a witness. Further, to nab the notorious, sometimes any ends are justified.

The movie ends with Ravi Shankar asking the public to be careful when someone rings the doorbell.

== Cast ==
- Pooja Gandhi as Lakshmi
- P. Ravishankar as Inspector Chalapathi
- Makarand Deshpande as Krishna
- Ravi Kale as Chander
- Shruti as Abhivyakti "Abhi"
- Sanjjana as Chandri
- Kari Subbu as Chikkmuniya
- Petrol Prasanna
- Adi Lokesh as Umesh Reddy
- Danny Kuttappa
- Jayadev Mohan as Koti Thimma
- Muniraju
- Satyajith as Jailor
- Harish Rai as Prathap

== Soundtrack ==
The soundtrack was composed by Arjun Janya.

3 Dandupalyam 3

Soundtrack album by Arjun Janya
- Released: 2018
- Genre: Feature film soundtrack
- Language: Kannada
- Label: Vivid Dreams Entertainment
- Producer: Arjun Janya

Arjun Janya chronology
College Kumar (2017)	3 Dandupalyam 3 (2018)	Nane Next CM (2018)

=== Kannada version ===
Kannada track list
No.	Title	Lyrics	Singer(s)	Length
1.	"Arugarugo"	Bhuvana Chandra	Arjun Janya	2:30
2.	"Ganja Ganja Ganja"	Bhuvana Chandra	Simha	4:00
Total length:				6:30

=== Telugu version ===
Telugu track list
No.	Title	Lyrics	Singer(s)	Length
1.	"Arugarugo"	Bhuvana Chandra	Arjun Janya	2:30
2.	"Ganja Ganja Ganja"	Bhuvana Chandra	Simha	4:00
Total length:				6:30

== Critical reception ==
The writer Sunayana Suresh of The Times of India, rated the film 3/5 and stated "It is advisable for one to watch the first two parts of the film to understand what the style of filmmaking is. Nothing is mellowed down, and there crude criminals and officers are shown as is. P Ravi Shankar steals the show as the ghastly cop on a mission to make these heartless criminals confess to their crimes. Pooja Gandhi in her uninhibited avatar is another person who deserves applause. Makarand Deshpande evokes fear, while the rest of the cast stay true to their parts."

The writer of Chtraloka, rated 3.5/5 and stated "Terrifying account of Dandupalya crimeIII, part three of the film on the Dandupalya gang's crime is a terrifying account of the ways and Director Srinivas Raju has made a film that will shock and scare people about how this gang was captured and brought to book."

The writer of Cinema Express, rated 3/5 and stated that "Pooja Gandhi wins over the audience with her powerful performance, while Makarand Deshpande gets deep into the character's skin. Ravi Shankar is an all-rounder and makes no mistakes in getting into the police avatar. Shruthi, Kari Subbu, Ravi Kale, and Danny are all well chosen for their roles and do justice to them. Arjun Janya's background score is haunting and complements the script well."

The writer of Telangana Today, called it 'A package of spine-chilling scenes' and stated that "Director Srinivasa Raju does well in his raw presentation of crimes committed by Dandupalyam gang and some of the spine-chilling scenarios are aptly supported with the background score of Arjun Janya. The conclusion also is executed well leaving little scope for questions to be raised. On the acting front, Ravi Shankar as police officer Chalapathi wins accolades while other leads, Pooja Gandhi and Makarand Deshpande leave a positive mark."

The writer Shyam Prasad of Bangalore Mirror, stated that "It is a more stylish version of the first part. The cinematography and editing are top class. The stylish presentation, however, does not cover the intent; to shock and awe. Expletives, ample display of cleavage, graphic murders and rapes do the trick. If that excites you, III is for you."

The writer Sharadha of New Indian Express, rated 3/5 and stated that "Pooja Gandhi wins over the audience with her powerful performance, while Makarand Deshpande gets deep into the character's skin. Ravi Shankar is an all-rounder and makes no mistakes in getting into the police avatar."

== Sequel ==
Dandupalya 4, the fourth film in the series and a sequel to Dandupalya 3, was directed by K. T. Nayak and released in 2019.

== See also ==
- Dandupalya
- Dandupalya 2
