= Ram Talluri =

Indian film producer in Tollywood

- Born: September 26th Andhra Pradesh, India
- Occupation: Film producer
- Political party: Jana Sena Party
- Spouse: Rajani Talluri

Ram Talluri is an Indian entrepreneur, film producer working in Tollywood.He is associated with actor and politician Pawan Kalyan and has been linked with the Jana Sena Party. He produces films under his production banner SRT Entertainments. Ram produced his first film Chuttalabbai in 2016. He later produced Dandupalya 3, a Kannada-language crime thriller in 2018 , Nela Ticket in 2018, Disco Raja in 2020, and Mechanic Rocky in 2024.

== Early life and career ==
Ram Talluri began his professional career in the information technology sector before expanding into construction, real estate and entertainment ventures. He is associated with companies including Lead IT Corporation, Ram Innovations, and Ram Entertainments (Sky Zone).

== Filmography ==
=== As producer ===
Year	Title	Cast	Director	Language	Notes
2016	Chuttalabbai	Aadi Saikumar, Namitha Pramod, Sai Kumar	Veerabhadram Chowdary	Telugu	
2018	Dandupalya 3	Pooja Gandhi, Makarand Deshpande, P. Ravi Shankar	Srinivas Raju	Kannada	
2018	Nela Ticket	Ravi Teja, Malvika Sharma, Jagapati Babu	Kalyan Krishna	Telugu	
2020	Disco Raja	Ravi Teja, Payal Rajput, Tanya Hope, Bobby Simha	Vi Anand	Telugu	
2022	Kinnerasani	Kalyaan Dhev	Ramana Teja	Telugu	
2023	Vasantha Mullai; Vasantha Kokila	Bobby Simha, Reshmi Menon	Ramanan Purushothama	Tamil; Telugu	
2024	Matka	Varun Tej, Meenakshi Chaudhary	Karuna Kumar	Telugu	
2024	Mechanic Rocky	Vishwak Sen, Meenakshi Chaudhary, Shraddha Srinath	Ravi Teja Mullapudi	Telugu	

Also he produced a Bengali film Tiger, which was a remake of Tamil film Ramana, Released on 2007.

== Other ==
There are some speculations about his entry into politics, becoming a member of Pawan Kalyan's Jana Sena Party.
