= Dandupalya 2 =

- Theatrical release poster
- Directed by: Srinivas Raju
- Written by: Srinivas Raju
- Produced by: Venkat
- Starring: Pooja Gandhi; Makarand Deshpande; P. Ravishankar; Shruti; Sanjjana
- Cinematography: Venkat Rama Prasad
- Edited by: C. Ravichandran
- Music by: Arjun Janya
- Production company: Venkaat Movies
- Release date: 14 July 2017
- Running time: 102 minutes
- Country: India
- Language: Kannada
- Budget: ₹1.5 crore
- Box office: ₹10.25 crore

Dandupalya 2 (or simply 2) is a 2017 Indian Kannada-language crime thriller film directed by Srinivas Raju and produced by Venkat. Based on the infamous dacoit gang from Dandupalya, the film is a sequel to the 2012 film Dandupalya and the second instalment in the Dandupalya franchise. The film stars Pooja Gandhi, continuing her role from the predecessor. The principal cast includes P. Ravi Shankar, Makarand Deshpande, Ravi Kale, Shruti, and Sanjjana. The film features music composed by Arjun Janya and cinematography by Venkat Prasad. The film opened to mixed reviews from audience and critics upon the release and went on to become a box-office hit at both Karnataka and Andhra Pradesh.

The film was dubbed into Telugu language and released as Dandupalyam 2. While the official launch of the movie was held on 24 March 2016, the theatrical release was on 14 July 2017. The makers announced that they would release the third sequel in August 2017, but it was later rescheduled.

== Plot ==
The opening scene starts with the gang taken to the prison for execution, with Inspector Chalapathi warning the prison's warden to be careful with them. An Indian Express investigative journalist Abhivyakti "Abhi" starts re-investigating the entire case, insisting that there had been no circumstantial evidence, no signs of fingerprints, no semen tests made to confirm the rape and murders. She starts with the local jewellery maker, who reveals that stolen ornaments were remade with him and produced as false evidence in the court and that the witness from Singapore was also fake. She finds various secrets and confidential information, including not lodging an FIR and taking away the gang for 40 days torturing them. She meets a victim's parents, who say that no neighbour had seen them in the locality, nor they have seen the accused and further on asking why they believed it was them, they reply that police took the victims to them and explain how they committed the crime. She claims that they were falsely framed on the virtue of being poor. After an initial failed attempt, she gets a chance to meet them, and they are shifted to another prison, specifically for execution. Here they meet the innocent-looking Umesh Reddy. The gang narrate their side of the story to Abhi, accusing the police of using torture to frame them.

The gang members explain their problems: Migrating to an unknown land, not having food to eat, living in the slums, begging for food, often turned down by many homes for domestic work, thus forced to eat stray animals. They soon find work as construction workers. When the Dandupalya serial killings, thefts and gang-rapes occur, there is considerable pressure on the Inspector for his failure to keep crimes in check though forces were increased. One night, after a late-night movie show, the inspector spots two of the gang members (the squint-eyed old man from the first movie) and hits them when they fail to show the tickets. He then drops them to their slum. The next night, a murder and theft incident occurs and the inspector comes to the site. The squint-eyed steals a gold ring to cure his wife's leg hurt by an iron nail. He tries selling it to a local jewellery shop, but just then the inspector arrives and hits him. That night, the police forcefully take away the rest of the gang members to a secluded spot and torture them, including sexually assaulting a female gang member. Finally, after 40 days of physical torture, they agree to crimes which they have not committed.

Abhi then prints an article accusing police of using force and false evidence. The inspector meets her and the rest follow the sequel.

== Cast ==
- Pooja Gandhi as Lakshmi
- Sanjjana as Chandri
- Makarand Deshpande as Krishna
- P. Ravi Shankar as Inspector Chalapathi
- Ravi Kale as Chander
- Shruti as Abhivyakthi
- Kari Subbu as Chikkmuniya
- Petrol Prasanna
- Jayadev Mohan as Koti Thimma
- Adi Lokesh as Umesh Reddy
- Satyajith as Jailor
- Avinash as Police officer
- Rekha Sagar as Prisoner
- Tanisha Kuppanda as Prisoner

== Soundtrack ==
2 Dandupalyam 2

Soundtrack album by Arjun Janya
- Released: 2017
- Genre: Feature film soundtrack
- Language: Kannada
- Label: Vivid Dreams Entertainment
- Producer: Arjun Janya

Arjun Janya chronology
Tiger (2017)	2 Dandupalyam 2 (2017)	Chamak (2017)

The soundtrack was composed by Arjun Janya.

=== Kannada version ===
Track list
No.	Title	Lyrics	Singer(s)	Length
1.	"Janana Sari Samaa"	V. Nagendra Prasad	Ashwin	2:48

=== Telugu version ===
Track list
No.	Title	Lyrics	Singer(s)	Length
1.	"Jananam Oka Katha"	Mythili Kiran	Ashwin	2:48

== Release ==
The film was awarded an "A" certificate by the Central Board of Film Certification. It was released across Karnataka on 14 July 2017 with the title name as 2 after courts were against the use of the word Dandupalya in the film's title. The Telugu version was released a week later, on 21 July 2017.

=== Critical reception ===
A critic from The Times of India rated the film three-and-a-half out of five stars and wrote that "The filmmaker has brought two sides of the case in the first two parts of the film and this leaves the viewer curious about the third and concluding part. Go watch this film, its worth that trip to the hall". A critic from The News Minute wrote that "Unless you are a hardcore fan of the first Dandupalya film, it’s probably easier to give this one a miss". A critic from Bangalore Mirror wrote that "The biggest burden on 2 is Dandupalya itself. Those who enjoyed the first film will find this tepid and too timid. 2 is good in itself and builds up the expectations about the promised sequel". A critic from The New Indian Express rated the film three out of five and wrote that "A special mention with regard to costumes and art work, which bring each frame alive. With Part 3 also in the offing, this one for now is an interesting watch".

== Controversy ==
The scenes involving characters being stripped and tortured was leaked, creating controversy. Sanjjana clarified that she performed this scene wearing clothes and that the news had been blown out of proportion.

== Box office ==
The film received positive reviews from the critics and mixed reviews from the audience upon the release in Karnataka in around 210 theaters with 85% occupancy in 'B' and 'C' centres, and performed fairly well at the Sandalwood box office. One week later the film was released in Andhra Pradesh and Telangana in over 120 screens, and opened to decent reviews and went on to become commercially successful at the Tollywood box office against a low production budget an estimated ₹1.5 crore.

== See also ==
- Dandupalya
- Dandupalya 3
