= Ritu Barmecha =

Indian film actress

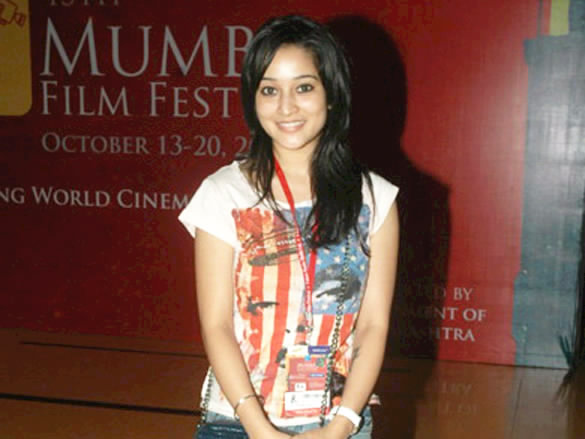
- Ritu Barmecha at 13th Mumbai Film Festival in 2012
- Born: Ritu; 16 November 1988 (age 37); Delhi, India
- Relatives: Rajat Barmecha (brother)

Ritu Barmecha is an Indian actress. She starred, along with Allari Naresh, in the film Aha Naa Pellanta directed by Veerabhadram Chowdary.

== Personal life ==
Her brothers Rajat Barmecha and Vicky are also pursuing careers in film.

== Filmography ==
Film

Year	Film	Role	Language	Notes
2011	Aha Naa Pellanta	Sanjana	Telugu	
2012	Vasool Raja	Jaanu	Telugu	
2013	Action 3D	Sandhya	Telugu	

Television series

Year	Film	Role	Language	Channel
2016	Agar Tum Saath Ho	Neema (Lead Role)	Hindi	Zindagi
