= Kathe Chitrakathe Nirdeshana Puttanna =

- Theatrical film poster
- Directed by: Srinivas Raju
- Written by: Srinivas Raju
- Based on: Geethanjali (Telugu)(2014) by Raj Kiran
- Produced by: Narayana Babu
- Starring: Komal Kumar; Priyamani; P. Ravi Shankar
- Cinematography: Shyam Prasad
- Edited by: C. Ravichandran
- Music by: Arjun Janya
- Production company: Apple Blossom Creations
- Release date: 1 January 2016
- Running time: 138 minutes
- Country: India
- Language: Kannada

Kathe Chitrakathe Nirdeshana Puttanna (transl. Story, screenplay, direction Puttanna) is a 2016 Indian Kannada-language comedy horror film directed by Srinivas Raju. It is a remake of the 2014 Telugu horror comedy, Geethanjali. It stars Komal Kumar and Priyamani in the lead roles whilst Pooja Gandhi also features in a pivotal role. Arjun Janya composed the soundtrack and background score for the film.

== Plot ==
P. Ravi Shankar, a businessman, rapes and kills Anjali, a Bharatanatyam dancer, after she slaps him when he asked her for one night sex and also rejects his marriage proposal before this. Using his influence he modified and make others believe that she committed suicide due to his boyfriend's sex torture. Priyamani returns as ghost to avenge her death. Parallel to this, her twin sister tries to make Ravi Shankar a lunatic (mental patient) for the same reason to avenge her sister's death. What will happen to Ravi Shankar in climax? forms the crux of the story.

== Cast ==
- Priyamani
- Komal Kumar as Puttanna
- P. Ravi Shankar
- Doddanna as a producer
- Sadhu Kokila as Dr. Saithan Raj
- Bullet Prakash
- Pooja Gandhi as Herself in a Cameo appearance
- Kuri Prathap
- Prashanth Siddi
- Anirudh Balaji
- Jaidev Mohan
- Srinivas Gowda
- Danny Kuttappa
- Dingri Nagaraj
- Mohan Juneja

== Controversies ==
Since the title included the name "Puttanna", it was strongly referenced to the veteran film maker Puttanna Kanagal. However, the director Srinivasa Raju denied the reports which suspected the story line linked to the legendary director. Kanagal's wife Nagalakshmi raised an objection to the release of the film. She asked the director to show the film to her prior to its release to which the team agreed.

Apart from the title, the film's first trailer also kicked up controversy with Komal's character mocking several Kannada film stars and directors. To this Komal denied any involvement in such activities.

== Music ==
Arjun Janya has composed 2 songs and the audio is released under Ashwini Media Networks banner.

== Reception ==
=== Critical response ===
Sunayana Suresh of The Times of India scored the film at 3.5 out of 5 stars and says ". P Ravi Shankar has an interesting role unlike his usual loud villainous characters and his scenes with Komal are a treat, for it is a battle of two good talents trying to outdo each other. However, it is Priya Mani who takes the cake, with an author-backed role." Shyam Prasad S of Bangalore Mirror scored the film at 3.5 out of 5 stars and says "Komal gives his best as if his life depended on this film. He is ably supported by the other cast. The real highlight is Priyamani in an uncommon role. If you are looking for fun, KCNP is the place to be."Vijaya Karnataka scored the film at 3.5 out of 5 stars and says "The cinematography and background music for the horror scenes is the Sakhat mix. Thus, those who have a hardened heart should watch movies. Komal stands by his cinema again. The cinema can be seen as a thrill experience with comedy."

== Box office ==
Kathe Chitrakathe Nirdeshana Puttanna has completed 50 days of successful run at the box-office. Puttanna was the first Kannada film to complete 50 days run at the box-office in 2016. And became commercially successful at the box office.
