= Hey Prabhu! =

Indian web series

- Promotional poster
- Genre: Comedy, Romance
- Written by: Nihit Bhave
- Directed by: Shashanka Ghosh
- Starring: Rajat Barmecha; Parul Gulati; Ritu Raj Singh; Achint Kaur; Sheeba Chaddha; Prynca Talukdar
- Composers: Advait Nemlekar; Arijit Datta; Dipanjan Guha
- Country of origin: India
- Original language: Hindi
- No. of seasons: 2
- No. of episodes: 16

Production
- Executive producer: Gautam Talwar
- Producer: Sanket Kunde
- Cinematography: Vijay Mishra
- Editor: Bhupesh 'Micky' Sharma
- Production company: Times Studio

Original release
- Network: MX Player
- Release: 20 February 2019

Hey Prabhu! is a 2019 Hindi-language comedy web series directed by Shashanka Ghosh for MX Player. The series stars Rajat Barmecha, Parul Gulati, Ritu Raj Singh, Achint Kaur, Sheeba Chaddha and Prynca Talukdar. It is written by Nihit Bhave and produced by Sanket Kunde. The series was premiered on 20 February 2019, on MX Player. The second season of Hey Prabhu! was released on 26 March 2021.

== Plot ==
The web series is based on the story of a boy named Tarun Prabhu (played by Rajat Barmecha), who is in his mid-20s with a strong fan following on social media platform, Twitter. Tarun soon realizes that online popularity is not enough to overcome real-life situations. Mita (played by Achint Kaur) and Arunima (played by Parul Gulati) hate Tarun's reckless behaviour and make his life difficult at work. Arunima (played by Parul Gulati), Mita's senior correspondent, who assists Tarun. His social life gets disturbed when everyone gets to know that he is suffering from erectile dysfunction. The title is a pun on Hey Prabhu, (Oh God), a common opening for Hindi prayers and poems.

== Cast ==
- Rajat Barmecha as Tarun Prabhu
- Sheeba Chaddha as Tarun's mom
- Rituraj Singh as Ishwar Prabhu (Tarun's father)
- Neha Panda as Rimjhim
- Vaishnavi Rao as Ira
- Ashish Bhatia as Aarambh
- Parul Gulati as Arunima
- Achint Kaur as Mita
- Raj Bhansali as Tejpal
- Pryanca Talukdar as Karishma
- Shashwat Mukherjee as Sumanta
- Devdutt Daani as ChaarMinaar

== Marketing and release ==
The web series's official trailer was launched 13 February 2019, by MX Player on YouTube. It is streaming on OTT Platform MX Player from 20 February 2019. The second season was released on 26 March 2021, on MX Player platform.

=== Piracy ===
All the episodes of the series were leaked by the bootleg website Tamil Rockers within a week of release.

== Reception ==
Sakshma Srivastav of Times Now gave three-and-a-half of five, saying, "What I liked about the show is one, its entertaining plot and two, its natural performances. There is a lot of situational comedy and drama." D.Krishna Prasad, writing for IWMBuzz gave 3.5 out of 5 stars and said, "The overall package, in terms of acting, script, background work, is really good. It is depicted in a natural and powerful way. It features an interesting real life story and a script well written by Nihit Bhave. The main reason why it seemed more realistic was because the series adopted a hilarious and funny way to show Rajat Barmecha's problem in a comical way, even while it touched upon the real aspects of today’s generation." TheDigitalHash.com stated, "Hey Prabhu is one of the rare web series that has an intelligent script and wants to handle the protagonist's personal as well as work-life with crackling speed and laser-sharp precision."
