= Umesh Reddy =

Indian serial rapist and serial killer

- Born: BA Umesh; 1969 (age 56–57); Basappa Malige, Karnataka, India
- Other names: Rajulu, Ramesh, Venkatesh
- Convictions: Murder (9 counts); Rape
- Penalty: Death (2009); commuted to 30-year imprisonment (2022)

Details
- Victims: 18+
- Span of crimes: 1996–2002
- Country: India
- States: Karnataka, Maharashtra, Gujarat

Umesh Reddy (born 1969) is a serial killer and serial rapist from India. He confessed to killing 18 women, and was convicted in 9 cases. The police believe that he raped at least 20 women in the states of Karnataka, Maharashtra and Gujarat. They also suspect that several of his crimes have not been reported, because the victims feared social stigma.

The Karnataka High Court sentenced Reddy to death in 2009, a decision upheld by the Supreme Court of India in 2011. After Reddy filed a mercy petition, the Supreme Court commuted his death sentence to a 30-year sentence in 2022.

== Early life ==
Umesh Reddy was born BA Umesh in 1969, in Basappa Malige, a village in Chitradurga district, Karnataka.

After being selected in the Central Reserve Police Force (CRPF), he was posted in Jammu and Kashmir. While on duty as a guard at the house of a commandant, he attempted to rape the commandant's daughter. He then fled to Chitradurga district. In 1996, he managed to join the District Armed Reserve (DAR) Police, who were not aware of his background in CRPF. Reddy had been charged in a road rage incident, but the local DAR inspector chose to ignore this "petty case". Reddy completed his police training in Madhya Pradesh, and then returned to Karnataka.

== Crimes ==
Reddy carefully selected his victims. He usually targeted housewives between 11 am and 3 pm, when there would be no men at home. He would gain entry into the victims' house on the pretext of asking for water or an address. He then threatened them with a knife, forced them to remove their clothes, tied them up, and raped them. He often choked his victims, and raped them while they were unconscious. After the rape, Reddy killed his victims and removed their jewellery to make the crime appear like a robbery. He then escaped with the victim's undergarments. Reddy was found wearing women's lingerie under his clothes, whenever the police arrested him.

In November 1996, Reddy attempted to rape a high school girl, who was walking at KEB Colony in Chitradurga. The girl hit him with a stone and managed to escape. On 6 December 1996, Reddy allegedly raped and murdered 16-year-old Roopa, when she was returning to her house in the same locality. The next month, he was arrested and dismissed from service, when his first victim identified him at a Republic Day police parade by chance.

Reddy, along with four others, was charged with Roopa's murder, and remanded to judicial custody (later, in 2004, he was acquitted in this case due to lack of sufficient evidence). A court asked him to be shifted to Bellary jail. In March 1997, while the Chitradurga police were handing him over to the Bellary prison authorities, Reddy escaped. He then killed an income tax officer's wife in Bangalore, a girl in Ahmedabad, two girls in Baroda and a widow in Kunigal.

Reddy would steal lingerie put up for drying in the backyards of houses. On 7 July 1997, he was arrested by Peenya police for stealing women's undergarments. When the police raided his room, they recovered a gunny bag full of lingerie. At the time of his arrest in Peenya, he told the police that his name was "Ramesh". Reddy escaped within 24 hours while being transferred to the MICO Layout police station for interrogation in another case. The police initially tried to hush up his escape, but Reddy's father filed a habeas corpus petition in the High Court. Two police personnel were then suspended, and a lookout notice was issued in the name of Ramesh.

On 28 February 1998, Reddy raped and murdered 37-year-old widow Jayashree Maradi Subbaiah in Peenya. The police believe that he repeatedly had sex with the dead body. When her 8-year-old son Suresh returned from school, he saw Reddy in his house. Reddy told the boy that an evil spirit had entered his mother's body, so he had tied her to the window grill. He then fled saying that he was going to get a doctor. Reddy then attempted to rape another woman in Peenya. When the woman raised the alarm, he tried to escape by jumping from the first floor of the house. He sprained his ankle, and was caught by the neighbours, who handed him over to the police.

In 1999, Reddy once again escaped from the police custody near Hirekerur. Before he could commit any crime, he was arrested by inspector Nyame Gowda, in Chikkaballapur.

On the night of 3–4 March 2002, Reddy escaped from police custody again, while being transferred from Bellary to Bangalore in a KSRTC bus. The District Armed Reserve (DAR) personnel of Bellary, who accompanied him, claimed that he was handcuffed at the time, but Reddy denied this when he was arrested two months later. He stated that he bought rum and chicken for the policemen, and earned their trust. When the bus stopped at a dhaba near Hiriyur bypass, he requested the policemen to remove his handcuffs on the pretext that he needed to answer the call of nature. Once free, he ran into the fields and escaped.

Over the next two months, Reddy raped three girls in Davangere, Hubli-Dharwad and Pune. He also stole three mobile phones and two credit cards. He worked as a waiter in a Pune hotel. He stole cash and clothes from there, and then fled to Dharwad.

On 17 May 2002, Reddy arrived in Bangalore from Tumkur, and left his luggage in the cloakroom at the Yeshwanthpur railway station. Around 8 am, he visited a salon in Yeshwanthpur area, to get a haircut and a clean shave. As he entered the salon, an auto-rickshaw driver Sathyavelu recognized him from a newspaper photograph and an earlier court appearance. The driver called his elder brother Rajendran from a telephone booth and asked him to fetch the police. Meanwhile, he kept a vigil outside the salon. When Reddy exited the salon and started walking towards the railway station, Sathyavelu tipped off the police and followed him. Inspector Nagaraja Urs intercepted Reddy near Sharief Nagar and arrested him. At first, Reddy claimed to be somebody else but admitted that he was the serial killer, after being taken to the police station. The police rewarded the driver with ₹ 20,000. Reddy was found wearing a bra and panties. His baggage, seized from the cloakroom, contained several women's garments: 18 pairs of panties, 10 bras, 8 churidars, 6 saris, 4 blouses and 2 nighties.

== Death sentence ==
Reddy was tried and convicted in 9 cases, including the rape of Jayashree Subbaiah. He was acquitted in 11 cases due to lack of sufficient evidence. On 26 October 2006, Judge K Sukanya of the Bengaluru city fast-track court gave him multiple sentences including a death sentence, a 7-year sentence plus ₹ 25,000 fine and a 10-year sentence plus ₹ 25,000 fine. Reddy tried to win the judge's mercy by saying that he wanted to study and take care of his mother, but the judge did not relent. Since the death sentence was the heaviest sentence, the case was referred to the High Court as per procedure.

On 4 October 2007, a division bench of the Karnataka High Court also convicted Reddy, but the judges differed on the death sentence. Justice V G Sabhahit upheld the death penalty, but Justice Ravi B Naik advocated rigorous imprisonment for life with no scope for amnesty. A third judge, Justice S. R. Bannurmath, was appointed to resolve the tie. On 18 February 2009, Bannurmath upheld the death sentence, and thus, the High Court confirmed the death penalty for Umesh Reddy. On 1 February 2011, the Supreme Court also upheld the death sentence. Justices Altamas Kabir and A K Pathak argued that Reddy was incapable of rehabilitation, and that his rape and murder of Jayashree fell under "rarest of the rare" category, a requirement for capital punishment in India.

Reddy immediately filed a mercy petition before the President of India. On 7 May 2012, the Government of Karnataka rejected Reddy's mercy plea. Subsequently, the President of India also rejected his mercy petition on 12 May 2013. Reddy then filed a fresh petition, following which on 4 November 2022, the Supreme Court commuted his death sentence to 30 years imprisonment.

== In popular culture ==
The Kannada language movie Umesh (2013) is a fictionalized version of Umesh Reddy's life. Khatarnak or Khataranak Umesh Reddy (2013), another Kannada movie, was also based on Umesh Reddy's life. His character was also portrayed by Adi Lokesh in Dandupalya 2 & Dandupalya 3, where he is seen as one of the inmates of Dandupalya gang in Hindalga Prison.

A three-episode documentary called Beast of Bangalore: Indian Predator was released on Netflix on 16 December 2022 depicting Umesh's heinous crimes. The documentary included interviews with local police officials, victims and associates who helped Umesh in some of his crimes.

== See also ==
- List of serial killers by country
