= Thaggedele =

Indian suspense thriller film

- Release poster
- Directed by: Srinivas Raju
- Written by: Srinivas Raju
- Produced by: Prem Kumar Pandey; N Akhilesh Reddy; P V Subba Reddy
- Starring: Naveen Chandra; Divya Pillai; Ananya Raj; P. Ravi Shankar
- Cinematography: Venkat Rama Prasad
- Edited by: Garry BH
- Music by: Charan Arjun; Chinna (BGM)
- Production company: Bhadra Productions
- Release date: 4 November 2022
- Country: India
- Language: Telugu

Thaggedele (transl. I won't back down) is a 2022 Indian Telugu-language suspense thriller film directed by Srinivas Raju and starring Naveen Chandra, Divya Pillai, Ananya Raj and P. Ravi Shankar.

The film's title is based on a popular dialogue from Pushpa (2021). P. Ravi Shankar, Pooja Gandhi, Makarand Deshpande and Ravi Kale reprise their roles from the Kannada-language Dandupalya franchise. The film was dubbed into Kannada as Hubli Dhaba.

== Plot ==
Inspector Chellappa is on the verge of busting the drug mafia in the city and waits for the right moment. Meanwhile, a corporate man gets entangled with the world of drugs and later becomes a suspect in a murder case. Simultaneously, the D-gang from Dandupalyam returns with a vengeance. Who committed the murder? Did the gang get their revenge forms the crux of the story

== Cast ==
- Naveen Chandra as Eshwar
- Divya Pillai as Devi
- Ananya Raj as Liza
- P. Ravi Shankar as Chalapathy
- Naina Ganguly
- Raja Ravindra
- Naga Babu
- Ayyappa P. Sharma
- Pooja Gandhi as Lakshmi
- Makarand Deshpande as Krishna
- Ravi Kale as Chander
- Rupa Lakshmi

== Soundtrack ==
The music is composed by Charan Arjun.

1. "Thaggede Le"
2. "Idhe Idhe"
3. "Ninnu Kalaganna"

== Reception ==
A critic from The Times of India wrote that "High on intense violence, strong language and bold romance, the film manages to entertain and thrill in parts. However, it is not for the faint-hearted". A critic from Sakshi Post wrote that "Thaggede Le is a thriller movie that works to an extent. There is plenty of violence and also adult content. Watch it if you don't mind those elements".
