= Dandupalya 4 =

- Directed by: KT Nayak
- Written by: KT Nayak
- Produced by: Venkat
- Starring: Suman Ranganathan
- Cinematography: Manu Girish
- Music by: Anand Rajavikraman
- Production company: Venkaat Movies
- Release date: 1 November 2019
- Country: India
- Language: Kannada

Dandupalya 4 is a 2019 Indian Kannada-language crime thriller film directed by KT Nayak and starring Suman Ranganathan. The film is based on the infamous dacoit gang from Dandupalya, and it is the fourth installment of the Dandupalya franchise.

The film was dubbed in Telugu as Dandupalayam 4. The film was partially reshot in Tamil as Dandupalyam by Venkat with Sonia Agarwal, Vanitha Vijayakumar, Supergood Subramani and Birla Bose. The Tamil version featured scenes from the previous films of the franchise, and was released on 7 June 2024.

== Cast ==
- Suman Ranganathan as Sundri
- Banerjee as Kaali
- Sanjeev Kumar as Venkta
- Richa Shasthri as Chinny
- Vittal Ranganaya as Jatka
- Bullet Soma as Govinda
- Jeeva Simon as Konde
- Sneha Nayar as Manji
- Arun Bachan as Muniya
- Rockline Sudhakar as Michine Rajanna
- D. S. Rao as Olegowda
- Venkat as Ashok Kumar
- Mumaith Khan in an item number

== Production ==
In March 2018, Pooja Gandhi confirmed that she was not a part of the film and director Srinivas Raju disassociated himself with the film saying that he made a trilogy and that this film was trying to bank off of the Dandupalaya name. While shooting for the film in Pavagada, the film cast and crew were confused for real life child traffickers.

In January 2019, the film was rejected by the Indian censor board.

== Soundtrack ==
The music was composed by Anand Rajavikraman.

Track listing
No.	Title	Singer(s)	Length
1.	"Kannu Hodeyo"	Anthony Daasan, Jogi Sunitha	4:00
2.	"Duddire Duniya"	Chandan Shetty, Indu Nagaraj	4:03
Total length:			8:03

== Release ==
The film was initially scheduled to release on 15 August 2019.

== Reception ==
A critic from The Times of India rated the film two out of five stars and wrote that "The film doesn't offer anything new. The story lacks new content and freshness compared to the previous editions and is not engaging". Regarding the Telugu-dubbed version, a critic from 123telugu rated the film one-and-three-quarters out of five and wrote that "On the whole, Dandupalayam 4 fails to live up to all its expectations. The same crime scene and violence has been doubled in this part which is hard to digest and does not impress you one bit".

Regarding the Tamil version, a critic from Maalai Malar gave a mixed review. Thinaboomi critic wrote that the director has very cleverly incorporated the current scenes with the older scenes.
