= Shivam (2015 Kannada film) =

- Theatrical release poster
- Directed by: Srinivas Raju
- Written by: Srinivas Raju
- Produced by: C. R. Manohar
- Starring: Upendra Rao; Saloni Aswani; Ragini Dwivedi
- Cinematography: Venkat Rama Prasad
- Edited by: Vinod Manohar
- Music by: Mani Sharma
- Production company: Tanvi Films
- Distributed by: Jayanna Films
- Release date: 2 January 2015 (India)
- Running time: 149 minutes
- Country: India
- Language: Kannada
- Budget: ₹15 crore (US$1.6 million)

Shivam is a 2015 Indian Kannada action thriller film written and directed by Srinivas Raju and produced by C. R. Manohar. It stars Upendra, Saloni Aswani, Ragini Dwivedi, Makarand Deshpande, Sharath Lohitashwa, P. Ravi Shankar and Srinivasa Murthy.

Shivam was released on 2 January 2015 and received positive reviews from critics. It was dubbed and released in Telugu as Brahmana in 2016.

== Premise ==
Basavanna is forced to become a priest after his father's sudden death, where he soon learns about the manipulations in the temple's maintenance and decides to eliminate them.

== Cast ==
- Upendra as Basavanna / Alexander
- Saloni Aswani as Bhavani
- Ragini Dwivedi as Mandira undercover RAW officer/Amanulla Khan's concubine
- Makarand Deshpande
- Sharath Lohitashwa
- P. Ravi Shankar as Amanulla Khan
- Srinivasa Murthy as Parameshwar Bhat
- Avinash as Siddanna
- Gowrish Akki as Shivu
- Sihi Kahi Chandru
- Bullet Prakash
- Geetha
- Bhavya
- Doddanna
- Lohithaswa
- Chidanand
- C. R. Gopi as Bhoothayya
- Shivaram
- Lakshman
- Muni
- Kitti
- Pooja Jhaveri in "Alli Nodu" song

== Production ==
=== Casting ===
Reports emerged in May 2013 of Upendra's signing for the film, then titled Basavanna and that Srinivasa Raju would be directing it. The report said the film however, would not be based on the life of the 12th century A.D. Indian social reformer Basavanna. Ragini Dwivedi's casting as the first female lead was confirmed in June 2013, her second opposite Upendra, after Arakshaka (2012). Saloni Aswani, who was cast opposite Upendra in Budhivanta (2008) and Dubai Babu (2009) was signed as the second female lead in July 2013.

=== Filming ===
The principal photography began on 15 May 2013 in Bangalore Palace. Filming began in June 2013, at the Dodda Ganeshana Gudi, a temple in the Basavanagudi locality of Bangalore. It required that Upendra sport a bald head in the film, and instead of the head being shaved, prosthetics were used, considering that he was simultaneously filming with another film that did not require the look. The 3-D effects used in making it was the first for an Indian film and costed around ₹90 lakh (US$93,000). Parts of the shooting were completed in India, Sweden, Thailand and Turkey. The shooting schedule in India was however delayed by over a month, owing to delay in getting official permission for filming at the temple site in Thanjavur. The Indian schedule also included filming in Chennai, Mysore, Melukote and Bangalore. The song sequences were then filmed in places like Istanbul and Antalya in Turkey, and Cyprus. Speaking of Upendra's dialogues and screen time in the film, Raju said, "Upendra has very less dialogues in this film, that's quite a change from what people have seen of him on screen so far." and said that he would feature in the bald look for 40 minutes in the film. Filming completed in May 2014, and the film producer was said to have contemplated its release on 18 September 2014, on the occasion of Upendra's birthday, which however did not materialise. The work on dubbing was complete at the Balaji Digital Studio in Bangalore in late October 2014.

=== Title controversy ===
The controversial first look poster of Shivam (then titled Basavanna)

Following the announcement of the film and during the pre-production stages, the film was titled Hara Hara Mahadev. Following a discussion by the makers, it was retitled Basavanna. This caused an uproar in the Lingayat community in Karnataka, as the name suggested a reference to the Lingayatism pioneer and social reformer Basava, referred to commonly as Basavanna. The issue was raised at the Karnataka Legislative Assembly by former Chief Minister of Karnataka, B. S. Yeddyurappa, who urged that the title be changed. Following this, the director decide to title the film Brahmana, but this title was refused permission by the Karnataka Film Chamber of Commerce (KFCC) and was immediately withdrawn. The producers then decided to release the film theatrically without a title. The film posters showed a symbol of Nandi, a bull, believed to be the vehicle of the mythological Hindu deity Shiva, and Upendra sitting in dhyana mudra, the spiritual gesture of meditation, like an ascetic. Having been rejected by the KFCC again, sections of the Kannada film industry began calling it Naama and Trinetra, before the film was titled Shivam, which the Regional Board of Film Certification accepted in mid-November 2014.

=== Marketing ===
The first look poster was launched on 13 May 2014, two days prior to the muhurat shot. It featured a person seated in Chin Mudrā posture with a pistol by his side. The poster became controversial and immediately drew the attention of the media, following which the Manohar promised that the forthcoming posters would not feature the pistol. The motion poster of it was released on YouTube. Following this, posters were released featuring Upendra with a bald head brandishing a sword. They were followed by title-less posters featuring Upendra in dhyana mudra with a symbol of Nandi by his side and another featuring three horizontal lines of Vibhuti with deity Shiva's third eye vertically across them. The film trailer was released on 30 November 2014, on the occasion of the film's audio release in Bangalore.

== Music ==
Shivam

Soundtrack album by Mani Sharma
- Released: 30 November 2014
- Genre: Feature film soundtrack
- Length: 26:55
- Label: Lahari Music

Background score for the film and soundtrack were composed by Mani Sharma, with lyrics for the soundtracks written by K. Kalyan and V. Nagendra Prasad. The soundtrack album consists of six tracks. It was released on 30 November 2014 in Bangalore.

Track listing
No.	Title	Lyrics	Singer(s)	Length
1.	"Dham Dham Dhamaruga"	K. Kalyan	Karunya	5:27
2.	"Sarala Virala"	V. Nagendra Prasad	Dinakar, Sreenidhi	4:51
3.	"Roma Roma Romance"	K. Kalyan	Karunya, Ramya Behra	4:30
4.	"Dreamige Bande"	V. Nagendra Prasad	Karunya, Sahithi	4:20
5.	"Bandekkira"	V. Nagendra Prasad	Anjana Sowmya	4:22
6.	"Alli Nodu Illi Nodu"	V. Nagendra Prasad	Sahithi, Sweekar Agasti	3:25
Total length:				26:55

== Release and response ==
The film was given the "U/A" (Parental Guidance) certificate by the Regional Censor Board, after making 25 cuts in the film, trimming it by four minutes. The censored part included scenes featuring dialogues on religion and the demolition of Indian temples in the past.

=== Critical reception ===
Upon theatrical release, the film received mostly positive reviews from critics. G. S. Kumar of The Times of India reviewed the film giving it a rating of 3.5/5, and felt that the film was "armed with a lively script". He credited the dialogues in the films and the role of cinematography and music. Of Upendra's performance, he wrote, "It's Upendra all the way, who steals the show with a brilliant performance." S. Viswanath of Deccan Herald gave it a rating of three out of five and wrote, "Over the top, full paisa vasool. That's Shivam for you. If a fan of Real Star, there’s double treat." He added writing praises of the performances of Upendra and Ragini Dwivedi and concluded, "Shivam, is one rollicking, riotous Uppi show, sending fans into hysterical frenzy." Shyam Prasad S. of Bangalore Mirror rated the film 3/5 and called the film "pro-religion" adding that "[the]...hero mouths all the relevant shlokas and quotes religious texts in Sanskrit when his credentials to become a priest are questioned." Without giving a clear verdict, he concluded writing, "The film may please a large section and rake in the moolah. The crowd is happy to see someone finally speak on screen what has become the talk on the street. Welcome to a religiously awakened Sandalwood." Writing for The New Indian Express, A. Sharadhaa felt that "unlike the edgy thriller, falls into a complete masala category." and added that "[The] hero-villain cat and mouse chase, strong dialogues, Upendra’s dramatic avatars, item songs and graphic violence form the essence of the film." She credited the performance of Upendra and the "screenplay saves the film somewhat as events unfold logically." IBNLive in its review gave the film a 1.5/5 rating and said it tests the watcher's "patience". It added that the film's plot was "clichéd" with a "misshapen screenplay" and that the music was "bland". Shashiprasad S. M. of Deccan Chronicle rated the film 1.5/5 and wrote, "Neither the script work is good or the making."
