= Ravi Kale =

Indian actor

- Born: 28 October 1973 (age 52); Ghodegaon, Maharashtra, India.
- Occupation: Actor
- Years active: 1994–present

Ravi Kale is an Indian actor known for his work in Kannada, Telugu, Hindi, Tamil, and Marathi films. He played Chander in the Sarkar series and the Dandupalya series.

== Filmography ==
=== Kannada ===
- Cyanide (2006)
- Vamshi (2008)
- Anjadiru (2009)
- Mylari (2010)
- Jackie (2010)
- Deadly-2 (2010)
- Dashamukha (2012)
- Khatarnak (2013)
- Attahasa (2013)
- Lakshmi (2013)
- Dandupalya (2013)
- Abhimanyu (2014)
- Ambareesha (2014)
- Vajrakaya (2015)
- Mythri (2015)
- Ram-Leela (2015)
- Ricky (2016)
- Tyson (2016)
- Home Stay (2016)
- Happy Birthday (2016)
- Jaguar (2016)
- March 22 (2016)
- Pushpaka Vimana (2017)
- Hebbuli (2017)
- Naa Panta Kano (2017)
- Dandupalya 2 (2017)
- Dandupalya 3 (2018)
- Amma I Love You (2018)
- Kumari 21F (2018)
- Jhansi I.P.S (2020)
- Gana (2025)

=== Telugu ===
- Mass (2004)
- Shock (2006)
- Ashok (2006)
- Asadhyudu (2006)
- Okka Magaadu (2008)
- Salute (2008)
- Drushyam (2014)
- Jaihind 2 (2014)
- Jadoogadu (2015)
- Krishna Gaadi Veera Prema Gaadha (2016)
- Rendu Rendlu Aaru (2017)
- Naa Peru Surya (2018)
- Padi Padi Leche Manasu (2018)
- Software Sudheer (2019)
- Aranya (2021)
- Thaggedele (2022)
- Ahimsa (2023)
- Harom Hara (2024)
- Daaku Maharaaj (2025)
- Mathru (2025)
- Krishna Leela (2025)

=== Hindi ===
- Ek Hasina Thi (2004)
- Ab Tak Chhappan (2004)
- James (2005)
- Sarkar (2005)
- Teesri Aankh: The Hidden Camera (2006)
- Black Friday (2007)
- Aag (2007)
- Go (2007)
- Sarkar Raj (2008) as Chander
- Agyaat (2009)
- The Attacks of 26/11 (2013)
- Baadshaho (2017)
- Haathi Mere Saathi (2021)

=== Tamil ===
- Saravana (2006)
- Kreedam (2007)
- Sathyam (2008)
- Thenavattu (2008)
- Aattanayagann (2010)
- Ayyanar (2010)
- Guru Sishyan (2010)
- Eppadi Manasukkul Vanthai (2012)
- Jaihind 2 (2014)
- Dhigil (2016)
- Kaala (2018)
- Kaadan (2021)
- Pattathu Arasan (2022)

=== Marathi ===
- Bangarwadi (1995)
- Sumbaran (2009)
- Paradh (2010)
- Pipani (2012)
- Vanilla, Strawberry & Chocolate (2018)
- Dashavatar (2025)

=== Television ===
- Shaitan (2023) (Telugu)
