= Nannavanu =

- Directed by: Srinivas Raju
- Written by: Srinivas Raju
- Produced by: Thulasi Gopal
- Starring: Prajwal Devaraj; Aindrita Ray; Avinash; Jayanthi
- Cinematography: K. Datthu
- Edited by: Suresh Urs
- Music by: Ilaiyaraaja
- Production company: Markwell Entertainment
- Release date: 28 May 2010
- Running time: 145 minutes
- Country: India
- Language: Kannada

Nannavanu (Kannada: ನನ್ನವನು) is a 2010 Indian Kannada language romantic drama film written and directed by Srinivas Raju and produced by Thulasi Gopal. The film stars Prajwal Devaraj along with Aindrita Ray and Avinash in pivotal roles. The film deals with the reincarnation revenge story as the backdrop. Music maestro Ilaiyaraaja scored the music and V. Nagendra Prasad wrote the lyrics for the songs.

The film released on 28 May 2010 across Karnataka and set high expectations for its storyline, music and also some controversies. However upon release, the film generally met with negative reviews from the critics and audience.

== Plot ==
Sanjana (Aindrita) suddenly wakes up to know that she was murdered in her previous birth. She musters up courage to fight a case and seek justice to her murder through a lawyer. She finds a struggling lawyer Bharadwaj (Prajwal) who has a striking resemblance to her lover in her previous birth. She hires him to fight her case and offers him huge amount even if he lost the case. They take up the case to fight against an MLA (Avinash) who was the Chief Minister earlier responsible for her death. What happens to her case and who wins forms the rest of the story.

== Cast ==
- Prajwal Devaraj as Bharadwaj
- Aindrita Ray as Sanjana
- Avinash
- Jayanthi
- Doddanna
- Ramesh Bhat
- Komal
- Satya Prakash
- Bank Janardhan
- Shankar Melkote as Professor Melkote
- Mandya Ramesh
- Kishori Ballal
- Shille Manjunath

== Production ==
Director Srinivas Raju announced his second directorial venture and called Nannavanu as a pure love story. He had said that the story had flashed to his mind during his engineering study days and was keeping on working on it. He said that actor Prajwal was having two different get-ups, one being a lawyer role. Shooting was initially scheduled for a straight 72 days but the team finished well within 58 days. During the shooting process, since the days clashed with the general elections, the team had to shift to Hyderabad's Ramoji Rao Studios to complete some sequences. However, the film got entangled in controversies such as actress Aindrita not attending the promotional campaigns since she alleged that she was not paid as promised by the producer. The director claimed that the producer's busy schedule was one of the reasons for the delayed release of the film.

== Soundtrack ==
Nannavanu

Soundtrack album by Ilaiyaraaja
- Released: 8 May 2009
- Genre: Film soundtrack
- Label: Audio 9
- Producer: Ilaiyaraaja

Ilaiyaraaja chronology
Kadha Thudarunnu (2010)	Nannavanu (2009)	Gaayam 2 (2010)

All the songs are composed by Ilaiyaraaja teaming up with the director yet again. A new audio company called Audio 9 was unveiled by politician Sahai Raj and the very first film to be produced under this label was Nannavanu. Actor Devaraj was the special invitee and he released the official soundtrack. The event was held in Bangalore on 8 May 2010.

All lyrics are written by V. Nagendra Prasad; all music is composed by Ilaiyaraaja.

Track listing
No.	Title	Singer(s)	Length
1.	"Denna Dennanna"	Vijay Yesudas
2.	"Hey Maamu"	Karthik, Vijay Yesudas, Tippu
3.	"Muthuthara Muthamma"	Ilaiyaraaja, Bela Shende
4.	"Modalane Baari"	S. P. Balasubrahmanyam, Bela Shende
5.	"Om Shivoham"	S. P. Balasubrahmanyam, Bela Shende
6.	"Enidu Enidu"	Sriram, Bela Shende
7.	"Devaadi Deva (bit)"	S. P. Balasubrahmanyam

== Reception ==
=== Critical response ===
Shruti Indira Lakshminarayana of Rediff.com scored the film at 1 out of 5 stars and says "Prajwal gets to shed his action hero image with Nannavanu and does a decent job. He is better off in the second half though. Aindrita is okay. Nannavanu fails to recreate the magic of some of the recent rebirth-oriented scripts like Magadheera. It can definitely be avoided". A critic from The Times of India scored the film at 2 out of 5 stars and says "Prajwal has done exceptionally well in the second half. Aindritha is okay. Komal excels in an impressive role. Music by Ilayaraja has only Tamil tunes and camera by K Dattu is average". Satish Shile from Deccan Herald wrote "The movie’s pace in the first half simply tests the audiences’ patience. It is a mix of senseless comedy and illogical sequence of events. The only welcome relief is Ilayaraja’s music". A critic from Bangalore Mirror wrote "Prajwal is good as the undertaker in the flashback while Aindrita does her job without much fuss. The music is a relief though not of the ‘hit’ quality you expect from Ilayaraja. Not a must watch but you won’t mind watching Nannavanu".
