= Vasool Raja =

- Directed by: Karthikeya Gopalakrishna
- Produced by: Batthula Rathanpaandu; Mahankali Divakar
- Starring: Navdeep; Srihari; Ritu Barmecha
- Music by: Chinni Charan
- Production company: BM Studios
- Release date: 11 April 2013
- Running time: 143 minutes
- Country: India
- Language: Telugu

Vasool Raja is a 2013 Indian Telugu-language action drama film directed by Karthikeya Gopalakrishna. The film stars Navdeep in a thief role and Srihari in a role of cop, while Rithu Barmecha, Brahmanandam, Satyam Rajesh plays supporting roles. The film was produced under the BM Studios banner by Batthula Rathanpaandu and Mahankali Divakar, Ramaswamy has written the film's dialogues and music was composed by Chinni Charan.The film released on 11 April 2013.

== Plot ==
Raja (Navdeep) is a part time robber. He makes his source of revenue by robbing cars. One a day he meets Janaki alias Jaanu(Ritu Bharmecha). At the same time he falls in love with Jaanu. He introduced himself as a business man. Time passes and Jaanu starts love with Vasool Raja.

They both get serious in love and they are planning to settle down in life. Then Vasool Raja plans his final robbery. He joined with a group who import illegal arms in to the country. Then ACP Yadav (Sri Hari) comes into the picture who is appointed to take care of the illegal arms. Then what happens to Vasool Raja? What happens to his love story? is rest of the film.

== Cast ==
- Navdeep as Raja
- Srihari as ACP Yadav
- Ritu Barmecha as Janaki alias Jaanu
- Brahmanandam
- Satyam Rajesh
- Thagubothu Ramesh
- Kadhal Dhandapani
- Jyothi
- Gemini Suresh

== Soundtrack ==
Vasool Raja

Soundtrack album by Chinni Charan
- Released: 2013
- Recorded: 2013
- Genre: Soundtrack
- Length: 18.56
- Label: Adithya Music
- Producer: Chinni Charan

The soundtrack was composed by Chinni Charan, songs were penned by Chinni Charan, Sagar Narayana, Mahie.

Track listing
No.	Title	Lyrics	Singer(s)	Length
1.	"Thimmini Bammini"	Chinni Charan	Rahul Nambiar	3:52
2.	"Jahnavi"	Sagar Narayana	Anudeep Dev, Aparna Nandhan	3:67
3.	"Nakko Nakko"	Mahie	Sahithi, Mahie	3:89
4.	"Muddosthunnav Nana"	Chinni Charan	Hymath, Bhargavi Pillaye	3:34
5.	"Paisaye Paramathma"	Sagar Narayana	Narsan Kasala, Geetha Madhuri, Hymath, Malavika, Deepthi, Shravana Bhargavi	4:14
Total length:				18.56

== Reception ==
The Times of India wrote, "Let’s just say the quality of acting is in sync with the utter mediocre the production values of the movie and leave it at that". The Hindu wrote, "If you’re looking at passively spend two and a half hours at the cinema amidst disjointed scenes, stale jokes and over dramatic performances, Vasool Raja is for you".
