= Rajat Barmecha =

Indian film actor

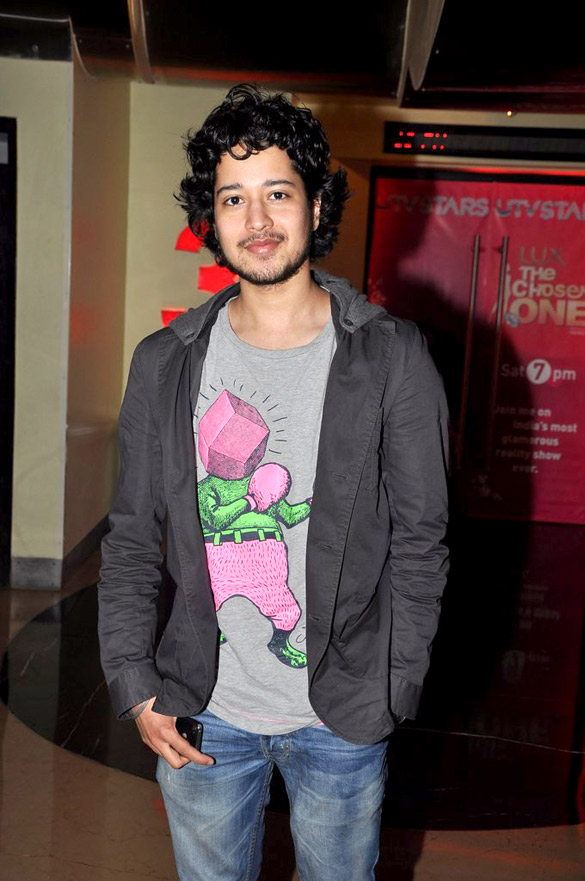
- Barmecha in 2020
- Born: Rajat Barmecha; Ladnun, Rajasthan, India
- Occupation: actor
- Years active: 2010–present
- Height: 1.78 m (5 ft 10 in)
- Relatives: Ritu Barmecha (sister)

Rajat Barmecha is an Indian actor who is best known for his lead role in the 2010 film Udaan.

== Childhood ==
Barmecha was born in Ladnun, Rajasthan, and grew up in Delhi. He attended Bal Bharati Public School, Brij Vihar. He has had a passion for acting since childhood. Though his father, Narendra Barmecha, is a Businessman, he supported Rajat to take up his dream.

His sister Ritu Barmecha is also an actor and brother Vicky Barmecha is a Film Director who assisted Anurag Kashyap on Bombay Velvet.

== Career ==
At 18 years old, Rajat moved to Mumbai to pursue a career in Jewellery designing but dropped the idea within a few days. He started his acting career by featuring in several commercials for brands like Frooti, Sonata and Max New York life insurance.

At the age of 21, he made his debut in the film Udaan. His character was of a 17-year-old Rohan (played by Barmecha) who had been expelled from boarding school after being caught watching an adult film. He is forced to return home to an authoritarian father and a half-brother he had been unaware of. For his role in the film, he was nominated for a Screen Award for Most Promising Newcomer – Male. He then made a cameo appearance in Shaitan.

Barmecha is a known face when it comes to Web-series. He first appeared in a special appearance as Kartik in the web-series Girl In The City, with Mithila Palkar in 2016.

== Filmography ==
Year	Title	Role	Other notes
2010	Udaan	Rohan	Award for Best Male Debut
2011	Shaitan	Shomu	Cameo
2011	Gulmohar	Nima	Short film
2011	The Finish Line	Ayaan	Won a National Award (Short Film)
2016	Girl In The City	Kartik (Special Appearance)	Web Series
2017	Leader (Tentative Title)	Romi	Post production
2017	Girl In The City (Chapter 2)	Kartik (Special Appearance)	Web Series
2018	Love, Lust and Confusion	Jonathan /Johnny	Web series(on viu app)
2018	Girl In The City 3	Kartik	Web Series
2019 - 2021	Hey Prabhu!	Tarun Prabhu	Web series on MX Player
2022	Kacchey Limbu	Aakash Nath	Film
