= Bhai (2013 film) =

- Promotional poster
- Directed by: Veerabhadram Chowdary
- Written by: Diamond Ratna Babu
- Screenplay by: Veerabhadram Chowdary
- Story by: Veerabhadram Chowdary
- Produced by: Nagarjuna Akkineni
- Starring: Nagarjuna Akkineni; Richa Gangopadhyay
- Cinematography: Sameer Reddy
- Edited by: Karthika Srinivas
- Music by: Devi Sri Prasad
- Production companies: Annapurna Studios; Reliance Entertainment
- Release date: 25 October 2013
- Running time: 154 minutes
- Country: India
- Language: Telugu

Bhai (transl. Brother) is a 2013 Indian Telugu-language action comedy film, produced by Nagarjuna Akkineni under Annapurna Studios and directed by Veerabhadram Chowdary in association with Reliance Entertainment. It stars Nagarjuna Akkineni and Richa Gangopadhyay, with music composed by Devi Sri Prasad. This remains the final Telugu film of Gangopadhyay as of May 2026.

== Plot ==
David, a Hong Kong-based don, relies heavily on his most skilled and trusted enforcer, Bhai, to manage his operations, much to the resentment of his sons, James and Tony.

David sends Bhai to Hyderabad to eliminate an undercover police officer disrupting the mafia's activities. There, Bhai meets Radhika, a horticulturist who falls in love with him, but he rejects her advances. While investigating the officer, Bhai discovers that he is Arjun. On the day of the trial, Bhai recognizes Arjun as his brother after seeing him with their father, Raghava, and abandons his plan to kill him. However, someone secretly records Bhai aiming a gun at Arjun. Meanwhile, several armed men disguised as civilians attack Arjun, who kills them all. Bhai is shocked to discover that one of the dead men is Tony, who had travelled to India at James's suggestion to kill Arjun and earn David's approval. Devastated by Tony's death, David vows to kill Arjun.

Bhai's associate Munna questions him about his unusual behavior at the scene, prompting Bhai to recount his past. Originally named Vijay, Bhai grew up in a village near Warangal with his siblings, Arjun and Geetha. Their father, Raghava, was highly respected but had a longstanding rivalry with Venkat Reddy.

When Raghava organizes the annual temple festival against Venkat Reddy's wishes, the latter sends his son to set fire to the festivities. Raghava catches the boy and locks him in a room, where the boy dies from an accidental injury caused by Raghava. Unaware of what happened, Raghava faces the consequences when Vijay takes the blame to protect his father's reputation and is imprisoned. After his release, Vijay assaults Venkat Reddy's men, prompting Raghava to expel him from the family home.

Vijay moves to Hyderabad and builds a life in David's criminal organization under the name Bhai. After Tony's death, Bhai, Munna, and their associates work to protect his family from David and James. Bhai reunites with Geetha, now a software professional preparing to marry Sandeep, who lives in the United States. At Geetha's request, Bhai reveals his identity to her and brings his henchmen to her home disguised as wedding planners, allowing him to participate in the celebrations. Radhika joins the group as a florist, making it difficult for Bhai to avoid her.

As the wedding preparations continue, Bhai reconnects with his family, although only Geetha and his paternal uncle know that he is Vijay. On the wedding day, Venkat Reddy calls Raghava and reveals that Sandeep is his foster son. He explains that he cannot attend the wedding because he has placed Sandeep under house arrest. Bhai rescues Sandeep, impressing Venkat Reddy and prompting him to reconcile with Raghava, allowing the wedding preparations to proceed.

To prevent David and James from interfering, Bhai and Munna arrange for their henchmen to kidnap James while posing as plain-clothes police officers. Although they beat him, James eventually escapes. As David and James head to the airport to return to Hong Kong, they recognize the leader of the gang that attacked James. After both the gang leader and Munna commit suicide, David discovers Bhai's schemes against him and James following Tony's death.

Meanwhile, after seeing the recording of Bhai aiming a gun at him, Arjun attempts to arrest his brother. Bhai escapes and attends Geetha's wedding as she wished. After Arjun is suspended and kidnapped by James, Bhai feigns surrender to the police before confronting them, sparing their lives and escaping with Arjun to Raghava's house. Having learned the truth about Vijay's past from his brother-in-law, Raghava reconciles with his son. At the family's urging, Bhai finally accepts Radhika's love.

== Cast ==
- Nagarjuna Akkineni as Bhai / Vijay
- Prasanna as Arjun
- Richa Gangopadhyay as Radhika
- Ashish Vidyarthi as David
- Sonu Sood as James
- Ajay as Tony
- Rahul Dev as Bhavani
- Nagineedu as Raghavayah, Bhai and Arjun's father
- Brahmanandam as Vikram Donor
- M. S. Narayana as Mansion Raju
- Raghu Babu as Ramaraj's henchman
- Adithya Menon as Munna
- Mukul Dev as Anthony
- Jaya Prakash Reddy as Venkat Reddy
- Kamna Jethmalani as Colony Girl
- Sayaji Shinde as Home Minister Mukund Pandey
- K. Viswanath
- Vennela Kishore as Home Minister's PA
- Paruchuri Venkateswara Rao as Vijay (Bhai)'s uncle
- Chalapathi Rao
- Duvvasi Mohan as Bhai's henchman
- Supreeth as Bhai's Henchman
- Hema as Mukund Pandey's wife
- Vinaya Prasad as Vijay a.k.a. Bhai's Mother
- Gundu Sudarshan as Customer in Ashram
- Prudhvi Raj as Bhai's Henchman
- Fish Venkat as Bhai's Henchman
- Satyam Rajesh as Bobby
- Dhanraj
- Narsing Yadav as Bhai's Henchman
- Prabhas Sreenu
- Rajitha
- Allari Subhashini
- Zara Shah
- Hamsa Nandini in a special appearance in the song "Most Wanted"
- Nathalia Kaur in a special appearance in the song "Bhai"

== Production ==
Brazilian model and actress Nathalia Kaur will be shaked a leg with Nagarjuna in this film. Hamsa Nandini shared screen space with Nagarjuna in a special song for this film. Sekhar Kammula's Life Is Beautiful fame Zara Shah got the chance to work with Nagarjuna in this film.

Few sequences of this film was shot in Predjama castle.

== Music ==
Bhai

Soundtrack album To Bhai by Devi Sri Prasad
- Released: 14 October 2013
- Recorded: 2013
- Genre: Feature film soundtrack
- Length: 19:30
- Language: Telugu
- Label: Aditya Music
- Producer: Devi Sri Prasad

Devi Sri Prasad chronology
Attharintiki Daaredhi (2013)	Bhai (2013)	1 (2013)

The music was composed by Devi Sri Prasad. Music was released on 14 October 2013 through Aditya Music. The soundtrack consists of 5 songs which received positive talk.

Track listing
No.	Title	Lyrics	Artist(s)	Length
1.	"Bhai"	Ramajogayya Sastry	Suchith Suresan	3:26
2.	"Nemmadiga"	Anantha Sriram	Venu Srirangam, Swetha Mohan	3:43
3.	"O Pilla Pilla"	Ramajogayya Sastry	David Simon, Rita	3:44
4.	"Aibaaboi Nee Choopu"	Bhaskara Bhatla	Tippu, Geetha Madhuri	3:53
5.	"Most Wanted"	Ramajogayya Sastry	Narendra, Mamta Mohandas	4:54
Total length:				19:30

== Critical reception ==
Bhai received mixed to negative reviews from critics: The Hindu wrote "Bhai is an ordeal to sit through unless you're interested in punch lines" and "Nagarjuna is the silver lining in this mediocre fare".

apherald.com gave rating of 1.5 out of 5 for Bhai.

== Box office ==
Bhai opened 80% – 100% occupancy on first day collected ₹ 85 million at the box office.
