= Chuttalabbai =

- Theatrical release poster
- Directed by: Veerabhadram Chowdary
- Written by: Veerabhadram Chowdary
- Story by: Veerabhadram Chowdary
- Produced by: Ram Talluri; Venkat Talari
- Starring: Aadi; Namitha Pramod
- Cinematography: S. Arun Kumar
- Edited by: M. S. Rajashekhar Reddy (S. R. Shekhar)
- Music by: S. Thaman
- Production company: SRT Entertainments
- Release date: 19 August 2016
- Running time: 155 minutes
- Country: India
- Language: Telugu
- Budget: ₹5 crores
- Box office: ₹10 crores

Chuttalabbai (transl. Relative's boy) is a 2016 Telugu-language romantic action comedy film . The film was directed and written by Veerabhadram Chowdary, and produced by S.R.T Entertainments. The film stars Aadi and Namitha Pramod.

== Plot ==
Recovery Agent Babji came across a girl, named Kavya and helped her. He discovered that she was in danger from her family. Babji saves her. Unfortunately, Kavya's brother misunderstood that Babji was behind this and starts chasing the couple.

Babji takes Kavya with him to his village and introduces her as his best friend. As time passes Kavya and Babji fall in love with each other, but at the end, both Kavya's family and another gang attack Babji and his family. The rest of the story shows how Babji handles the issue, solves his problems and eventually marries Kavya.

== Cast ==
- Aadi as Recovery Agent Babji
- Namitha Pramod as Kavya
- Sai Kumar as Dorababu, Babji's father
- Abhimanyu Singh as ACP Gautam Krishna
- John Kokken as Antagonist
- Prudhviraj as E. Govardhan Reddy "Mr. Ego"
- Ali as Kidnap Krish
- Posani Krishna Murali as Varada Raju
- Anitha Nath as Varada Raju's wife
- Malavika Avinash as Dorababu's wife, Babji's mother
- Yamini Malhotra as Chilaka
- Himaja as Himaja
- Charandeep as Police Officer
- Neelya Bhavani as Mr. Ego's keep
- Annapoorna as Babji's grandmother
- Vamsi Krishna as Police Officer, Gautam Krishna's colleague
- Raghu Babu
- Nagineedu
- Ravi Babu
- Murali Sharma
- Shravan
- Shakalaka Shankar
- Sudharshan
- Giridhar
- Bhadram

== Soundtrack ==
Chuttalabbai

Soundtrack album by S. Thaman
- Released: 20 July 2016
- Recorded: 2016
- Genre: Soundtrack
- Length: 21:22
- Label: Lahari Music
- Producer: S. Thaman

S. Thaman chronology
| Dhilluku Dhuddu (2016) | Chuttalabbai (2016) | Srirastu Subhamastu (2016) |

The music was composed by S. Thaman, and released by Lahari Music.

Track-List
| No. | Title | Lyrics | Singer(s) | Length |
|---|---|---|---|---|
| 1. | "Chotisi Jindagi" | Varikuppala Yadagiri | S. Thaman | 3:33 |
| 2. | "Pee Pee Dum Dum" | Ramajogayya Sastry | Ramajogayya Sastry, Sri Krishna, Geetha Madhuri | 5:09 |
| 3. | "Rabba Rabba" | Vasista Sharma | Deepak, Megha | 3:56 |
| 4. | "Dhum Dhum" | Ramajogayya Sastry | Sri Krishna, Deepu, Geetha Madhuri | 4:46 |
| 5. | "Chuttalabbayi" | Ramajogayya Sastry | Ramya Behara, Simha | 3:58 |
| Total length: | | | | 21:22 |
