= Mechanic Rocky =

2024 film directed by Ravi Teja Mullapudi

- Theatrical release poster
- Directed by: Ravi Teja Mullapudi
- Written by: Ravi Teja Mullapudi
- Produced by: Ram Talluri
- Starring: Vishwak Sen; Meenakshi Chaudhary; Shraddha Srinath
- Cinematography: Manojh Reddy Katasani
- Edited by: Anwar Ali
- Music by: Jakes Bejoy
- Production company: SRT Entertainments
- Release date: 22 November 2024
- Running time: 156 minutes
- Country: India
- Language: Telugu
- Box office: ₹10.87 crore

Mechanic Rocky is a 2024 Indian Telugu-language action comedy thriller film written and directed by Ravi Teja Mullapudi, in his directorial debut. It is produced by Ram Talluri under SRT Entertainments. The film stars Vishwak Sen in a dual role, alongside Shraddha Srinath and Meenakshi Chaudhary.

The film has music composed by Jakes Bejoy, cinematography handled by Manojh Reddy Katasani and editing by Anwar Ali. It was initially set to release on 31 October 2024, coinciding with Diwali but was eventually released on 22 November 2024. It received mixed reviews from critics and audiences and failed at the box office.

== Plot ==
The movie starts with a woman who has just come home after heavy rain. She later argues with her brother for being too irresponsible and lazy, due to which her brother commits suicide. She later feels bad for it.

Rakesh, a happy mechanic, runs a shop with his father Ramakrishna, also a mechanic. He also works as a part-time driving instructor. He meets Maya, a NIC employee who wants to learn to drive from Rakesh. Rakesh accepts, and both became friends. Maya wants to learn about Rakesh's past, so Rakesh tells her.

Rakesh's grandfather Nagireddeppa is a dangerous but funny faction leader who named his friend Reddappa's son. As Reddappa's enemies found this out, Nagireddeppa runs from them, but one of the henchmen cuts his left hand. Nagireddeppa later dies, and his grandson later becomes a carbon copy of him.

Rakesh then goes to college to pursue civil engineering, where he falls in love with Priya, the sister of his best friend Sekhar. Both Rakesh and Priya start a relationship, but she later cuts ties with him after his brother is falsely suspended for stealing the question paper, which Rakesh had done.

Priya later learns to drive, as her boss wants her to become her driver, but unexpectedly meets Rakesh. After a series of comic misadventures, Priya falls for Rakesh, who happily accepts. Rakesh also knows that his father has a dream of travelling from Kanyakumari to Kashmir, for which he gets a ticket from tours and travels. Ramakrishna was overjoyed that his son had fulfilled his dream, but unfortunately dies.

Ranki Reddy, a ruthless land grabber, decides to buy Rakesh's garage for a mall project. He sends Upma, his right-hand man, along with a few henchmen, to buy the garage, but Rakesh trashes them.

Maya, feeling bad for Rakesh, decides to help him by offering some money, and he accepts. As Rakesh is coming back to the garage, he finds out that Ranki Reddy is about to destroy the garage because Rakesh once made fun of him. Rakesh begs Rankireddy not to destroy it, to which Rankireddy tells Rakesh to get 2 crores immediately or face the consequences.

Maya immediately begins arranging money with the help of her manager Vivek. Kranthi, a suspended police officer, learns about the scams and arrests Vivek. Rakesh and Maya came to an abandoned place, where Vivek gets beaten up. Rakesh and Maya tell Kranthi not to get involved in this and leave Vivek alone, Maya even offers some money to Kranthi, who happily accepts. Kranthi later tells Rakesh to give him 40 lakhs. Maya gives Kranthi 10 lakhs, while Rakesh later goes to arrange 40 lakhs.

It is then revealed that Maya is Apsara, Vivek is Natraj, Kranthi is Chanti, and they are all scammers who exploit the poor and middle class by calling them and asking them for money. Rakesh later calls Priya and drops her off at the office. He then gives her the papers she forgot, but is shocked that she filed an FIR.

It is then shown that the man who committed suicide is none other than Sekhar, and the woman is Priya. Sekhar wanted to become a national cricketer and was shown to practice cricket every day. One day, he got a call from the bank people, who said they needed money to help him. Sekhar sold everything to them, unaware that they were scammers. Rakesh later realizes that they duped him, and out of shame, he commits suicide. Priya later regrets misunderstanding her brother. She then goes to every police station, but nobody helps her, as they do not know where these scammers are or what they look like.

Enraged, Rakesh decides to take matters into his own hands and find the scammers. He later realises that Apsara, Vivek, and Kranthi are the scammers. He decides to seek the help of Ranki Reddy, who is actually a good man, as Nagireddeppa named Redeppa's son Ranki Reddy, due to which Ranki Reddy is forever indebted to Rakesh's family. Ranki Reddy and Rakesh later stage an incident where Ranki Reddy threatens Rakesh to give him 2 crores or face the consequences.

It is then revealed that Ramakrishna was alive, and seeing the news of his death, he confronts Rakesh, who tells him all the truth.

Rakesh, with the help of Dhruvan, his police officer friend, and his team, nabs the scammers. In a one-to-one duel, Rakesh overpowers Chanti and trashes him publicly. The scammers are later jailed and are confused as to how Rakesh knew the plan. It is revealed that Rakesh knew the plan the day he met Apsara and took revenge on them smartly.

== Cast ==
- Vishwak Sen in a dual role as
  - Nagumomu Rakesh "Rocky"
  - Nagireddeppa, Rocky's grandfather
- Shraddha Srinath as Apsara / Maya
- Meenakshi Chaudhary as Priya
- Naresh as Nagumomu Ramakrishna, Rocky's father
- Sunil as Ranki Reddy
- Harsha Vardhan as Natraj / Vivek
- Raghu Ram as Chanti / R. Kranthi
- Vishwadev Rachakonda as Sekhar, Priya's brother
- Harsha Chemudu as Harsha, Rocky's friend
- Hyper Aadi as Murthy, a person who scams Ramakrishna
- Dhruvan Katakam as Dhruvan K., a police officer
- Manik Reddy as Upma

== Music ==
The music and background score is composed by Jakes Bejoy, in his first collaboration with Vishwak Sen and Ravi Teja Mullapudi. The audio rights were acquired by Sony Music India. The first single, titled "Gulledu Gulledu", was released on 7 August 2024. The second single, titled "Oo Pillo", was released on 18 September 2024.

No.	Title	Lyrics	Singer(s)	Length
1.	"Gulledu Gulledu"	Suddala Ashok Teja	Mangli	4:15
2.	"Oo Pillo"	Krishna Chaitanya	Nakash Aziz	3:58
3.	"I Hate U My Daddy"	Sanare	Ram Miriyala	3:20

== Release ==
=== Theatrical ===
The film was theatrically released on 22 November 2024.

=== Home media ===
The film began streaming on Amazon Prime Video from 13 December 2024 in Telugu and dubbed versions of Tamil, Malayalam and Kannada languages.

== Reception ==
A critic from The Hans India rated the film three out of five stars and wrote that "Mechanic Rocky explores the everyday struggles of the middle class while weaving in a gripping narrative about fraud and resilience. Raviteja Mullapudi succeeds in delivering a film that is both entertaining and thought-provoking." Paul Nicodemus of The Times of India gave the film three out of five stars and wrote that "Mechanic Rocky strikes a fine balance between mass entertainment and meaningful storytelling. The inclusion of cybercrime as a subplot adds contemporary relevance, elevating the film beyond a standard action-drama. With strong performances, Ravi Teja Mullapudi crafts a film that, despite its flaws, resonates emotionally and delivers action-packed entertainment."

T Maruthi Acharya of India Today gave it two-and-a-half out of five stars and wrote that "The central plot has promise, but it gets lost in trying to cram too many elements into one narrative, diluting the impact. With a tighter screenplay and more focused direction, this could have been a compelling thriller rather than a muddled mix of genres." Sashidhar Adivi of Times Now gave it two-and-a-half out of five stars and wrote that "Overall, the film delivered only in parts and fine-tuning of the script avoiding routine elements would have added more depth to the story."

Aditya Devulapally of The New Indian Express wrote, "The film sets your expectations so low with its initial silliness that when the twist lands, it feels like a masterstroke. However, this reliance on twists is a double-edged sword. Without them, the film offers little beyond technical finesse and a few clever moments. It’s a trick that works best when you go in expecting very little." Sangeetha Devi Dundoo of The Hindu wrote, "If Mechanic Rocky had done away with some of the stereotypical humour and song and dances and leveraged on its thriller portions, it could have been far more engrossing."

BVS Prakash of Deccan Chronicle gave it one-and-a-half out of five stars and noted that "Initially, the hero is pitted against a gangster who wants to usurp his garage and then he is pushed into an online scam and he flexes his muscles too". Swaroop Kodur of The Hollywood Reporter India opined that "Mechanic Rocky isn't a game-changer for the comedy-crime genre, but the good thing is that it doesn't wish to be one either. It's a good ol' entertainer that gets more right than wrong and has all the ingredients needed to keep us hooked nearly till the end."
