= Jailer (2023 Malayalam film) =

2023 film by Sakkir Madathil

- Theatrical release poster
- Directed by: Sakkir Madathil
- Written by: Sakkir Madathil
- Produced by: N. K. Mohammed
- Starring: Dhyan Sreenivasan; Manoj K. Jayan; Divya Pillai; Sreejith Ravi
- Cinematography: Mahadevan Thampi
- Edited by: Deepu Joseph
- Music by: Riyas Payyoli
- Production company: Golden Village Production
- Distributed by: Indian Movie Makers; 72 Film Company
- Release date: 18 August 2023
- Running time: 122 minutes
- Country: India
- Language: Malayalam

Jailer is a 2023 Indian Malayalam-language thriller drama film written and directed by Sakkir Madathil. It is a remake of the 1957 Hindi film Do Aankhen Barah Haath, directed by V. Shantaram. The film stars Dhyan Sreenivasan in lead role, alongside Manoj K. Jayan, Divya Pillai and Sreejith Ravi in the supporting cast. Set in the 1950s, it tells the story of a prison officer who stays in a bungalow with five prisoners who were charged with different crimes and his experiments to reform them.

Jailer was released in theatres on 18 August 2023. This movie was a box office bomb.

== Cast ==
- Dhyan Sreenivasan as Jailer Shantaram
- Manoj K. Jayan as Superintendent of Police
- Divya Pillai as Chembaka
- Sreejith Ravi as Keshavan
- Binu Adimali as Shankaran
- Navas Vallikkunnu as Kammaran
- Tiju Mathew as Madhavan
- Unni Raja as Dhamu
- Jayaprakash as Velu Thampi
- V. K. Baiju
- Shashankan
- Shanthakumari
- Ansi Vineesha
- Vasudev Sajeesh Marar
- Suryadev Sajeesh Marar

== Production ==
The title launch of the film was held in 2022 in Sharjah at the Come On Kerala event. On 4 November 2022, Prithviraj Sukumaran unveiled the film's motion poster through Facebook.

== Soundtrack ==
Jailer

Soundtrack album by Riyas Payyoli
- Released: 2023
- Venue: Kochi
- Studios: K7 Studios; NHQ Studios
- Genre: Feature film soundtrack
- Language: Malayalam
- Label: Millennium Audios
- Producer: Riyas Payyoli

The film's music is composed by Riyas Payyoli, with lyrics written by Nidheesh Nadery.

No.	Title	Lyrics	Singer(s)	Length
1.	"Vadum Mullapoovalla"	Nidheesh Nadery	Sithara	3:48
2.	"Ravinnin Lavala"	Nidheesh Nadery	Rijiya Riyas	3:54

== Release ==
Initially, the makers of the film had announced that Jailer would be released on 10 August 2023, but with the release of Tamil-language Jailer on the same date being announced, the release date was later postponed by a week. The film was released on 18 August 2023 across 85 theatres in Kerala and 40 theatres in GCC countries.

== Title dispute ==
The film's makers had disputes over the title with Rajinikanth's Jailer. According to director Sakkir Madathil, the title Jailer was registered with the Kerala Film Chamber of Commerce (KFCC) in August 2021. He had requested Sun Pictures consider changing the Tamil-language film's title when releases in Kerala. Later, both Sun Pictures and the makers of the Malayalam-language film took the title dispute to court.

== Reception ==
=== Critical reception ===
Princy Alexander of Onmanorama wrote "Overall, the dark and gloomy treatment of the film takes the sheen away from a movie made with good intentions." S.R. Praveen of The Hindu wrote "Jailer seems to have been made with the intention of never giving the audience anything to cheer for... it does succeed in that endeavour." Arjun Ramachandran of The South First gave the film 2.5 stars out of 5 and wrote "Jailer is a film with a novel theme but works only in parts."
