= Priya Himesh =

Priya Hemesh
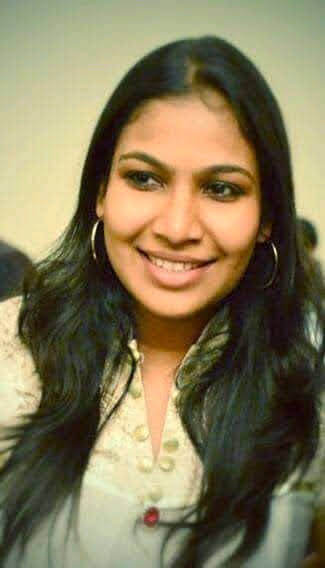

Background information
- Born: 10 February 1985 (age 40); Chennai, Tamil Nadu, India
- Genres: Playback singer
- Occupation: Playback singer
- Instrument: Vocals
- Years active: 2006-present
- Website: https://priyahemesh.com/

Priya Hemesh (also credited as Priya Himesh) is an Indian playback singer. She sings predominantly in Kannada, Telugu, Tamil, Malayalam, and Odia movies. She has sung more than 200 songs, working with many leading music directors like Illayaraja, Harris Jeyaraj, Imman, Vijay Antony, Devi Sri Prasad, Yuvan Shankar Raja, Mani Sharma, Karthik Raja, Bharadhwaj, Dhina, and numerous others.

Priya started singing in light music orchestras in 1989 and performed in more than 5,000 stage shows with many leading orchestras in India and overseas.

Priya is the recipient of the Filmfare Award for Best Female Playback Singer – Telugu for her Telugu song "Ringa Ringa" in the film Aarya 2.

== Selected discography ==
Year	Song name	Film name	Language	Music director	Notes
2006	"Rangu Raba Raba"	Rakhee	Telugu	Devi Sri Prasad	
2006	"Ondhe Ondhu Saari"	Mungaru Male	Kannada	Mano Murthy	
2006	"Nimbiya Banada Myagala"	Sevanthi Sevanthi	Kannada	S. A. Rajkumar	
2007	"Kan Vizhithal Vennilavu"	Guru	Tamil	A.R. Rahman	
2007	"Hudugi Malebillu"	Geleya	Kannada	Mano Murthy	
2007	"Kozhi Veda Kozhi"	Unakkum Enakkum	Tamil	Devi Sri Prasad	
2008	"Geleya Beku"	Moggina Manasu	Kannada	Mano Murthy	
2009	"A To Z" "Yenthapani Chestiviro"	King	Telugu	Devi Sri Prasad	
2009	"Seheri"	Oy!	Telugu	Yuvan Shankar Raja	
2009	"Ringa Ringa"	Arya 2	Telugu	Devi Sri Prasad	
2009	"Meow Meow"	Kanthaswamy	Tamil	Devi Sri Prasad	
2009	"Meow Meow"	Mallanna	Telugu	Devi Sri Prasad	
2009	"Yaare Ninna Mummy"	Maleyali Jotheyali	Kannada	V. Harikrishna	
2009	"Assalaam Walekkum"	Adhurs	Telugu	Devi Sri Prasad	
2009	"En Jannal Vandha"	Theeradha Vilaiyattu Pillai	Tamil	Yuvan Shankar Raja	
2009	"Neenendare"	Raam	Kannada	V. Harikrishna	
2009	"Ambum Kombum"	Pazhassi Raja	Tamil	Illayaraja	
2010	"Oorella Nanna Porki" "Daane Daane"	Porki	Kannada	V. Harikrishna	
2010	"Edavatt Aytu"	Jackie	Kannada	V. Harikrishna	
2010	"Ding Dong" "Tuttaadoin"	Namo Venkatesa	Telugu	Devi Sri Prasad	
2010	"Sarigama"	Hoo	Kannada	V. Harikrishna	
2010	"Band Baaja Nodu Majaa"	Kichha Huchha	Kannada	V. Harikrishna	
2010	"Kannu Randum"	Kutty	Tamil	Devi Sri Prasad	
2010	"Bulle Bulle"	Darling	Telugu	G.V. Prakash	
2010	"Neela Vaanam" "Neelaakasam"	Manmadhan Ambu; Manmadha Banam	Tamil; Telugu (dubbed)	Devi Sri Prasad	
2011	"Kettimelam"	Pesu	Tamil	Yuvan Shankar Raja	
2011	"Diyalo Diyala"	100% Love	Telugu	Devi Sri Prasad	
2011	"Kanchana Mala"	Vanthaan Vendraan	Tamil	S. Thaman	
2011	"Thagalakkonde Naanu"	Jogayya	Kannada	V. Harikrishna	
2011	"Roses Roses Everywhere"	Casanovva	Malayalam	Gopi Sundar	
2011	"Bad Boys"	Businessman	Telugu	S. Thaman	
2011	"Karuppanna Saami'"	Mambattiyan	Tamil	S. Thaman	
2011	"Pade Pade"	Jarasandha	Kannada	Arjun Janya	
2011	"Godava Godava"	Dhada	Telugu	Devi Sri Prasad	
2011	"Anukoneledhuga"	Panjaa	Telugu	Yuvan shankar raja	
2012	"Aathadi Manasudhan"	Kazhugu	Tamil	Yuvan Shankar Raja	
2012	"Mandya Dindha"	Lucky	Kannada	Arjun Janya	
2012	"Vegam Vegam"	Sridhar	Tamil	Rahul Raj	
2012	"Thugoji Pagoji"	All the Best	Telugu	Hemachandra	
2012	"Julayi"	Julayi	Telugu	Devi Sri Prasad	
2012	"Yaare Neenu"	Dandupalya	Kannada	Arjun Janya	
2012	"Vella Bambaram"	Saguni	Tamil	G. V. Prakash Kumar	
2012	"Manethanka Baare Manethanka"	Rambo	Kannada	Arjun Janya	
2012	"Dibiri Dibiri"	Genius	Telugu	Joshua Sridhar	
2012	"Ye Janma Bandhamo"	Mr. Nookayya	Telugu	Yuvan Shankar Raja	
"Thiru Guru"	Mr. Nagappan	Tamil	Thomas Rathnam		
2013	"Mississippi"	Biriyani	Tamil	Yuvan Shankar Raja	
2013	"London Babu"	1: Nenokkadine	Telugu	Devi Sri Prasad	
2013	"Kannukulle"	Singam II	Tamil	Devi Sri Prasad	
2014	"Uyrin Maeloru Uyirvanthu"	Vadacurry	Tamil	Yuvan Shankar Raja	
2014	"Nillu Nillu" "Yellu Yellu"	Dil Rangeela	Kannada	Arjun Janya	
2014	"Alludu Seenu"	Alludu Seenu	Telugu	Devi Sri Prasad	
2015	"Gathama Gathama"	Malli Malli Idi Rani Roju	Telugu	Gopi Sunder	
2015	"Dhimmathirigae"	Srimanthudu	Telugu	Devi Sri Prasad	
2016	"Thendral Varum Vazhiyil"	Oyee	Tamil	Ilaiyaraaja	
2016	"Aval"	Manithan	Tamil	Santhosh Narayanan	
2016	"Poda Poda Porambokku"	Thiru Guru	Tamil	Thomas Rathnam	
2017	"Appu Dance"	Raajakumara	Kannada	V. Harikrishna	
2017	"Innu Kaayalare"	Bangara s/o Bangarada Manushya	Kannada	V. Harikrishna	
2017	"Life is a rainbow"	Vunnadhi Okate Zindagi	Telugu	Devi Sri Prasad	
2017	"O Kothhaga Kothhaga"	Middle Class Abbayi	Telugu	Devi Sri Prasad	
2018	"Rama Loves Sita"	Vinaya Vidheya Rama	Telugu	Devi Sri Prasad	
2020	"Saattaiyin Munaiyil (Nee Seitha Neerodai)"	Meendum Oru Mariyathai	Tamil	Yuvan Shankar Raja	
2020	"Yengada Pona Romeo"	Yevanum Buthanillai	Tamil	Mariya Manokar	
2021	"Madhavi Ponmayilaaga"	Theal	Tamil	C. Sathya	
2022	"Thalape Toofaanai"	Regina	Telugu (dubbed)	Sathish Nair	
