= Aha Naa Pellanta! (2011 film) =

- Theatrical poster
- Directed by: Veerabhadram Chowdary
- Written by: Veerabhadram Chowdary
- Produced by: Ramabrahmam Sunkara
- Starring: Allari Naresh; Ritu Barmecha; Anita Hassanandani; Srihari; Brahmanandam
- Cinematography: Loganathan Srinivasan
- Music by: Raghu Kunche
- Distributed by: AK Entertainments
- Release date: 2 March 2011
- Running time: 2.30
- Country: India
- Language: Telugu
- Box office: 25 crores

Aha Naa Pellanta! (transl. Yeah! I'm Getting Married!) is a 2011 Indian Telugu language action comedy film written and directed by Veerabhadram. It stars Allari Naresh, newcomer Ritu Barmecha, and Anita Hassanandani with Srihari and Brahmanandam in important roles. The music was composed by Raghu Kunche. The film was released on 2 March 2011.

The movie completed 50 days in 48 centers across the state and 100 days in all main centers. It was reported that this was the only Telugu film which raked profits in early 2011 along with Mirapakay and Ala Modalaindi.Aha naa pellanta Blockbuster Movie

== Cast ==
- Allari Naresh as Subrahmanyam
- Ritu Barmecha as Sanjana
- Anita Hassanandani as Madhu
- Srihari as Durga, Sanjana's brother
- Brahmanandam as Balaraju
- Ahuti Prasad as Dr. Anand Rao, Subrahmanyam's uncle
- Rajitha as Subrahmanyam's aunt
- Subbaraju as Sanjana's brother
- Samrat Reddy as Sanjana's brother
- Jaya Prakash Reddy as Khan Dada (special appearance)
- Prithviraj as Pilot
- Thagubothu Ramesh as Fan
- Nagineedu as Jagarlamudi "JJ" Janaki Ramaiah, Sanjana's father
- Hamsa Nandini
- Ranganath
- Giridhar as Subrahmanyam's colleague
- M. S. Narayana as Naidu Pantulu
- AVS as Sanjana's would-be father-in-law
- Kota Srinivasa Rao as Narrator
- Satyam Rajesh
- Venu Madhav
- Vennela Kishore as Prem Das
- Sridhar Rao as Aditya Malhotra
- Sri Latha as Sanjana's friend
- Ruthika as Go-go dancer (cameo)
- Gundu Hanumantha Rao as Wedding guest (cameo)
- Mukhtar Khan as Durga's enemy

== Soundtrack ==
Aha Naa Pellanta!

Soundtrack album by Raghu Kunche
- Released: 2011
- Recorded: 2011
- Genre: Feature film soundtrack
- Length: 24:57
- Language: Telugu
- Label: Aditya Music
- Producer: Raghu Kunche

Raghu Kunche chronology
Bumper Offer (2009)	Aha Naa Pellanta! (2011)	Daggaraga Dooramga (2011)

The music was composed by Raghu Kunche.

Track list
No.	Title	Lyrics	Singer(s)	Length
1.	"Subrahmanyam"	Bhaskarabhatla	Raghu Kunche	4:25
2.	"Nuvve"	Sira Sri	Chitra	4:51
3.	"Left Chusthey"	Bhaskarabhatla	Venu, Simha, Bhargavi Pillai	4:11
4.	"Vennela Deepam"	Sira Sri	Raghu Kunche	3:26
5.	"Chinukulurali (Remix)"	Veturi	Raghu Kunche, Anjana Soumya	4:32
6.	"Saturday Evening"	Ramajogayya Sastry	Prudhvi Chandra, Anudeep Dev, Noel Sean (Rap)	3:30
Total length:				24:57
