= Divya Pillai =

Indian actress

- Born: Dubai, United Arab Emirates
- Citizenship: India
- Occupation: Actress
- Years active: 2015–present

Divya Pillai is an Indian actress who predominantly works in Malayalam films along with some Telugu and Tamil films. She debuted in the 2015 film Ayal Njanalla, followed by Oozham in 2016.

== Early life ==
Divya Pillai was born in Dubai, UAE to a Malayali Nair family. She began her career as a Flydubai employee prior to entering the film industry.

== Career ==
Pillai made her film debut in 2015 with the romantic-comedy Ayal Njanalla opposite Fahadh Faasil, in the directorial debut of actor Vineeth Kumar. Her second project was under the direction of Jeethu Joseph in Oozham (2016), a revenge-drama starring Prithviraj Sukumaran. The film was a box office success. In 2019 she had a guest role as Jancy in the television serial Uppum Mulakum. She made her Telugu debut with Thaggedele followed by Mangalavaaram.

== Filmography ==
=== Films ===
Key
†	Denotes films that have not yet been released

List of film credits
Year	Title	Role	Language	Notes
2015	Ayal Njanalla	Heera	Malayalam	
2016	Oozham	Gayathri	Malayalam	
2017	Masterpiece	Sreedevi	Malayalam	Cameo appearance
2019	My Great Grandfather	Delna	Malayalam	
2019	Edakkad Battalion 06	Sameera	Malayalam	
2019	Jimmy Ee Veedinte Aishwaryam	Jancy	Malayalam	
2019	Safe	Nithya	Malayalam	
2020	Easy Go	Anna	Malayalam	Short film
2021	Kala	Vidya	Malayalam	
2022	Kaathuvaakula Rendu Kaadhal	Young Minah Kaif	Tamil	
2022	King Fish	Mehrin Marakkar	Malayalam	
2022	Simon Daniel	Stella	Malayalam	
2022	Louis	Divya	Malayalam	
2022	Shefeekkinte Santhosham	Sainu	Malayalam	
2022	Thaggedele	Devi	Telugu	
2022	Naalam Mura	Mini	Malayalam	
2023	Jailer	Chembaka	Malayalam	
2023	Garudan	Haritha	Malayalam	
2023	Mangalavaaram	Rajeswari Devi	Telugu	
2024	Nadikar	David's mother	Malayalam	
2024	Raayan	Annam Sethuraman	Tamil	
2025	Thandel	Chandra	Telugu	
2025	Bazooka	Annie Benjamin	Malayalam	
2025	Ace	Kalpana	Tamil	
2025	Bhairavam	Purnima	Telugu	
2025	JSK: Janaki V v/s State of Kerala	Saira Fathima	Malayalam	
2025	Dheeram	SI Diya Prabhakar	Malayalam	
2026	Honey	Lalitha	Telugu	
2026	Bhishmar	Gouri	Malayalam	

=== Television ===
List of television credits
Year	Title	Role	Network	Notes
2019	Comedy Utsavam	Judge	Flowers	
2020	Uppum Mulakum	Jancy	Flowers	
2020–2021	Mr.&.Mrs	Judge	Zee Keralam	
2020–2021	GP Stories	DP	YouTube	
2021	Udan Panam 3.0	Participant	Mazhavil Manorama	
2021	Let's Rock And Roll	Mentor	Zee Keralam	
2021	Onam Ruchi Melam	Mentor	Asianet	

=== Web Series ===
List of television credits
Year	Title	Role	Language	Network	Notes	Ref
2023	Master Peace	Aparna	Malayalam	Disney+ Hotstar	Web Debut	
2023	The Village	Neha	Tamil	Amazon Prime Video		
2026	Super Subbu	Rajini	Telugu	Netflix		
