= Khatarnak (2013 film) =

- Promotional poster
- Directed by: Malavalli Saikrishna
- Written by: Malavalli Saikrishna
- Produced by: Adithya Ramesh
- Starring: Ravi Kale; Roopika; Shobha Raghavendra
- Cinematography: M. R. Seenu
- Edited by: J. N. Harsha
- Music by: Sadhu Kokila
- Production company: Adithya Ramesh Combines
- Release date: 22 November 2013
- Country: India
- Language: Kannada

Khatarnak is a 2013 Indian Kannada-language drama film directed by Malavalli Saikrishna and starring Ravi Kale in the titular role, Roopika and Shobha Raghavendra. The film was released to mixed-to-negative reviews.

== Cast ==
- Ravi Kale as Umesh Reddy
- Roopika as Roopa
- Sadhu Kokila as a police officer
- Sharath Lohitashwa as Hanumantha
- Bullet Prakash
- Shobha Raghavendra as Umesh's mother

== Production ==
The film was initially titled Khatarank Umesh Reddy before being shortened to Khataranak after the release of a similarly film titled Umesh (2013). The film was given an A certificate.

== Reception ==
A critic from Rediff.com rated the film two-and-a-half out of five stars and wrote that "Khatarnaak is devoid of entertainment or any elements that entertain. It is violence, sex and gore. But, the movie is a wake up call for vigilance in our neighbourhood". A critic from The Times of India rated the film two out of five stars and wrote that "Though director Malavalli Saikrishna has brilliantly presented each of his criminal acts with a firm grip over script and narration, the message he is sending to the youth through this movie is questionable. There is sex, violence and killings that were part of Umesh’s life". A critic from Bangalore Mirror wrote that "The film is strictly for those who want to watch ‘soft porn’ on big screen. But it is the first 15 minutes or so that actually titillate. The rest of it is just plain documentary of a serial killer's life"
