= Makarand Deshpande =

Indian actor, writer, and director (born 1966)

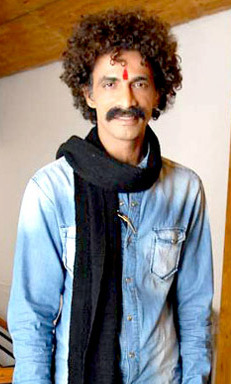
- Makarand Deshpande at Zee Marathi TV serial 'Kesari' launch
- Born: Mumbai, Maharashtra, India
- Occupations: Actor; director; writer; producer
- Spouse: Nivedita Pohankar (m. 2018)

Makarand Deshpande is an Indian actor, writer, and director in Hindi, Kannada, Marathi, Telugu, Malayalam, Tamil films, and Indian theatre. He is often seen in supporting and pivotal roles in films like Jungle, Sarfarosh, Swades, Makdee, Satya, Bbuddah... Hoga Terra Baap and Darna Zaroori Hai where he plays drunkard, wayfarer, and comic roles. He has directed five films.

== Career ==
His contribution to the theatre includes over 50 short plays and 40 full-length plays, including Sir Sir Sirla, Joke, Maa In Transit, Krishna Kidding, and Shakepearcha Mhatara. His recent play, Patni, with Niladri Kumar has been a hit across the country. His work in theatre started in 1990 at Prithvi Theatre with support from Sanjana Kapoor. He started Ansh Theatre Group in the year 1993, along with Kay Kay Menon, who remains one of the pillars of the group.

Deshpande is known for his role in the Kannada-language film series Dandupalya.

He made his English-language debut in the 2024 film Monkey Man, directed by Dev Patel.

== Television ==
- Aahat (1998) as Panna (season 1- episode 142 and 143)
- Circus (1989)
- Devta as Suraj (1996)
- Filmi Chakkar as Papa Natekar (1994)
- Waqt Ki Raftaar
- Sailaab
- Sarabhai vs Sarabhai (season 1- guest appearance)
- Asmita as Deshmukh Saheb (2014) (Guest Appearance - Ep 97)
- Kyunki Saas Bhi Kabhi Bahu Thi as Vijay Saxena
- Vikram Betaal Ki Rahasya Gatha (2018) (Betaal)
- Maharashtracha Superstar 2 as Judge

=== Web Series ===
Year	Title	Role	Platform	Notes
2017	Inside Edge	Mukund Pansare	Amazon Prime Video	
2019	Modi: Journey of a Common Man	Laxman Inamdar / Vakil Sahab	Eros Now	
2019	The Verdict – State vs Nanavati	Public Prosecutor Chandu Trivedi	ALTBalaji and ZEE5	
2020	Hundred	Satyendra Ahir aka Sattu Uncle	Hotstar	
2022	Shoorveer	Milind Phanse	Hotstar	
2022	The Fame Game	Harilal	Netflix	
2023	The Jengaburu Curse	Dr. Panigrahi	SonyLIV	

== Filmography ==
=== Director ===
- Danav (2003)
- Hanan (2004)
- Shahrukh Bola "Khoobsurat Hai Tu" (2010)
- Sona Spa (2013)
- Saturday Sunday (Marathi) (2014)

=== Actor ===
==== Hindi ====
- Qayamat Se Qayamat Tak (1988) (as Mac Deshpanday) as Baba
- Salim Langde Pe Mat Ro (1989) as Peera
- Prahaar: The Final Attack (1991) as Shirley's brother
- Anth (1994) as Kali
- Sir (1993) as Mak
- Bedardi (1993) as Gulla, Goon
- Pehla Nasha (1993)
- Jazbaat as Babban
- Naajayaz (1995) as Street Singer
- Naseem (1995)
- Fareb (1996)
- Ghatak: Lethal (1996) as Punk (repeatedly slapped by Kashi)
- Udaan (1997) (as Makarand Deshpande) as Masoombhai Dayachan
- Satya (1998) (as Makarand Deshpande) as Advocate Chandrakant Mule
- Sarfarosh (1999) as Shiva
- Jungle (2000) as Dorai Swamy
- Ghaath (2000) as Happy Singh
- Ek Aur Visphot (2002) as Mun. Comm. Omkar Manav
- Company (2002) as Narrator
- Pyaar Diwana Hota Hai (2002) (as Makrandh Deshpandey) as Bhiku
- Lal Salaam (2002) as Rajayya
- Road (2002) as Inderpal, Truck driver
- Makdee (2002) as Kallu, the village butcher
- Market (2003) as Anthony Kaalia
- Chameli (2003) as Taxi driver
- Hanan (2004) as Surya
- Paisa Vasool (2004)
- Ek Se Badhkar Ek (2004) as Krishnamurthy
- Swades (2004) as Fakir
- Khamoshh... Khauff Ki Raat (2005) as Manas Dutta
- Ek Khiladi Ek Haseena (2005) as Poker Player
- Darna Zaroori Hai (2006) as Rahul
- Yun Hota Toh Kya Hota (2006)
- Krazzy 4 (2008) as Drunk
- Guzaarish (2010)
- Khatta Meeta (2010) as Azad Bhagat
- That Girl in Yellow Boots (2010) as Post Master
- Bbuddah... Hoga Terra Baap (2011)
- My Friend Pinto (2011) as Don
- Kalpvriksh (2012)
- Jackpot (2013)
- Issaq (2013)
- Satya 2 (2013) (voiceover)
- Aa Gaya Hero (2017)
- Hawaa Hawaai (2014)
- Mogali Puvvu (2015)
- Pratichhaya (2016)
- Meri Beti Sunny Leone Banna Chaahti Hai (2017) as Father
- Fukrey Returns (2017) as Father of the main character
- The Wishing Tree (2017) as Sadho
- Hanuman: Da' Damdaar (2017) as Voice of Vishrav
- Game of Ayodhya (2017)
- Mere Pyare Prime Minister (2019)
- Junglee (2019)
- Chicken Curry Law (2019)
- Bombay Rose (2019)
- Malang (2020) as Tony
- Sadak 2 (2020) as Gyaan Prakash aka Guruji
- Liger (2021)
- 12 'O' Clock (2021) as Rao
- Shoorveer (2022)
- Bholaa (2023)
- Chhota Bheem and the Curse of Damyaan (2024) as Skhandi
- Jaat (2025) as a villager

==== Marathi ====
- Ek Ratra Mantarleli (1989)
- Rita (2009)
- Samaantar (2009)
- Ajintha (2012)
- Panhala (2015)
- Dagadi Chawl (2015)
- Mazhi Tapasya (2016) Baburao
- Truckbhar Swapna (2018)
- Chatrapati Shasan (2019)
- Aathva Rang Premacha (2021)
- Daagadi Chawl 2 (2022)
- Satarcha Salman (2023) as Arun Kalbhor
- Alyad Palyad (2024)
- Amhi Jarange (2024)
- PaniPuri (2024)
- Chaabi (2025)

==== Malayalam ====
- No. 66 Madhura Bus (2012) as Sanjayan
- Amen (2013) as Shevaliyar Pothachan
- Bhaiyya Bhaiyya (2014) as Maoist Leader
- Two Countries (2015) as Patelkar Ji
- Pulimurugan (2016) as Ramaiyya
- Kuttikalundu Sookshikkuka (2016) as Kareem Usthad
- Team 5 (2017)
- Sayanna Varthakal (2022)
- Voice of Sathyanathan (2023) as Saahi Bhai

==== Telugu ====
- Jalsa (2008) as Naxalite
- Ek Niranjan (2009) as Chidambaram
- Bombhaat (2020) as Mad Scientist
- Liger (2022) as Mallesh
- Romantic (2021) as Samsun
- RRR (2022) as Peddayya
- Thaggedele (2022) as Krishna
- Spy (2023) as RAW Chief Sastry
- Hidimbha (2023)
- Rules Ranjann (2023)
- Razakar (2024)
- Tiragabadara Saami (2024) as Konda Reddy
- Daaku Maharaaj (2025) as Govind Gujjar
- Hari Hara Veera Mallu (2025) as Meera
- Kishkindhapuri (2025) as Swamiji

==== Kannada ====
- Dandupalya (2012) as Dandupalya Krishna
- Aakramana (2014)
- Abhinetri (2015)
- Shivam (2015)
- Dandupalya 2 (2017) as Krishna
- Dandupalya 3 (2018)
- Adyaksha in America (2019) as Seth

==== Tamil ====
- Lisaa (2019) as Raghavan
- Ponniyin Selvan: II (2023) as Chief Kalamugar
- Jailer (2023) as Sikandar Singh

==== English ====
- Monkey Man (2024) as Baba Shakti

== Awards ==
- Suvarnaratna Lifetime Achievement Awards-2025
- Nominated Filmfare Award for Best Supporting Actor – Marathi for film Dagdi Chawl

South Indian International Movie Awards

- Best Actor in a Negative Role for Dandupalya and No. 66 Madhura Bus
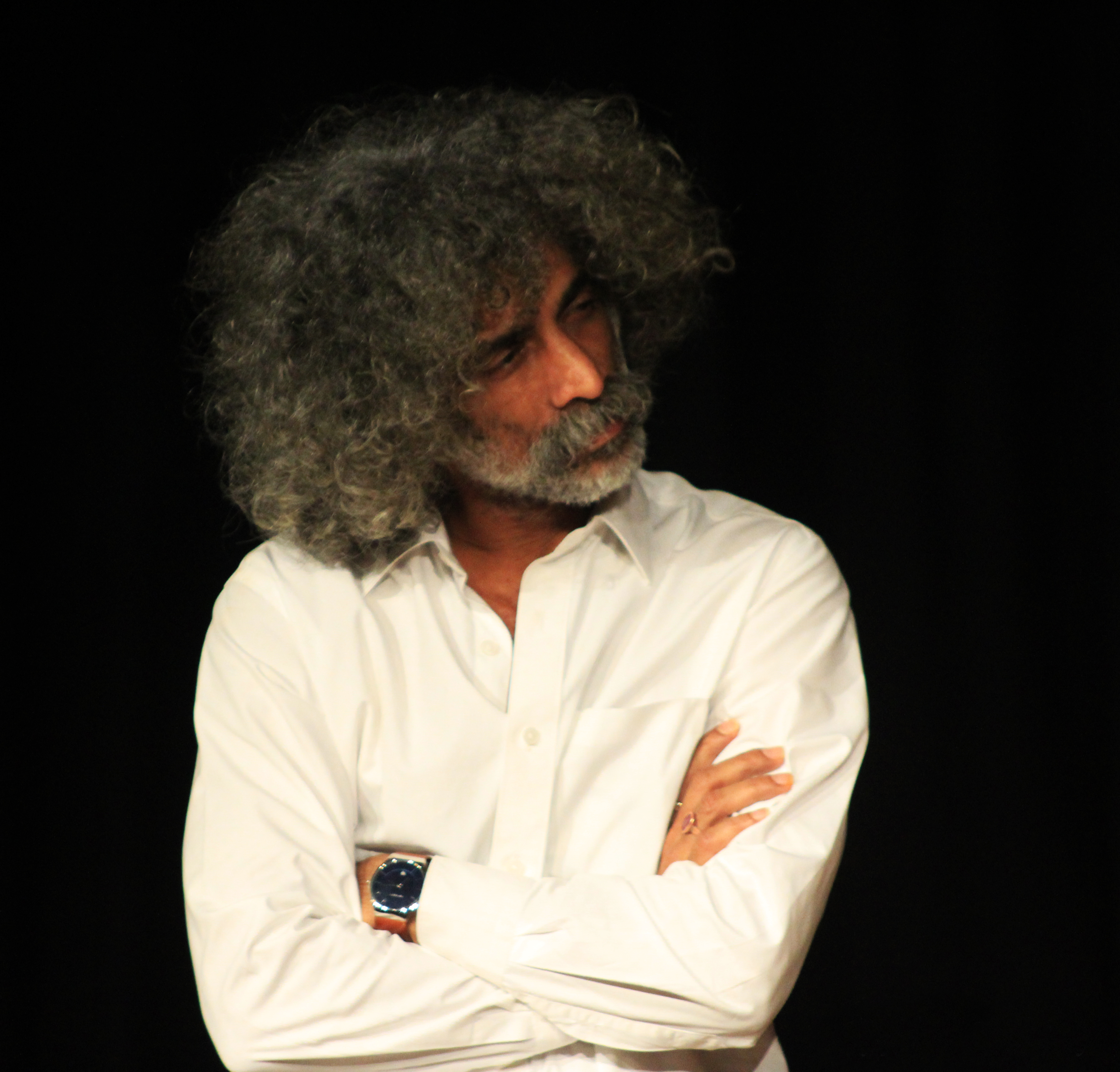
  Makrand Deshpande Latest Picture 2017
