= Veerabhadram Chowdary =

Indian film director

- Occupation: Film director
- Years active: 2011–present

Veerabhadram Chowdary is an Indian film director and screenwriter who works predominantly in Telugu cinema. He began his career in the Telugu film industry as an assistant director under E. V. V. Satyanarayana in 1997. He later worked with directors Teja, Jayanth C. Paranjee, Krishna Vamsi and A. Karunakaran as a co-director and in other filmmaking roles. He made his directorial debut with Aha Naa Pellanta (2011).

Veerabadhram Chowdhary

== Early life and education ==
Veerabhadram Chowdary is from Nidadavole, Andhra Pradesh. He completed his Bachelor of Commerce (B.Com) degree before entering the Telugu film industry. Veerabhadram Chowdary is from the Godavari region of Andhra Pradesh and hails from a farming family. His father was a farmer. He developed an interest in cinema from an early age and was passionate about films and filmmaking during his childhood.

== Career ==
- Early career Veerabhadram entered the Telugu film industry in 1997 and began his career as an assistant director under filmmaker E. V. V. Satyanarayana. He worked on several films, including:
  - Akkada Ammayi Ikkada Abbayi (1996)
  - Nenu Premisthunnanu (1997)
  - Kanyadaanam (1998)
  - Maavidakulu (1998)
  - Chala Bagundi (2000) He subsequently worked with director Teja as a co-director on several films, including:
  - Nuvvu Nenu (2001)
  - Family Circus (2001)
  - Jayam (2002)
  - Nijam (2003)
  - Yeh Dil (2003), the Hindi version of Nuvvu Nenu. He later worked on Shankar Dada M.B.B.S. (2004), directed by Jayanth C. Paranjee, as a second-unit director. He also worked as a co-director on Danger (2005), directed by Krishna Vamsi, and Happy (2006), directed by A. Karunakaran.

== Directorial career ==
- Veerabhadram made his directorial debut with the Telugu comedy & action film Aha Naa Pellanta, starring Allari Naresh and Ritu Barmecha. The film was released on 2 March 2011. He subsequently directed the following films:
  - Aha Naa Pellanta (2011)
  - Poola Rangadu (2012)
  - Bhai (2013)
  - Chuttalabbayi (2016) His films have primarily been Telugu comedy and commercial entertainers.

== Upcoming projects ==
Dilwala, a crime comedy featuring Naresh Agastya & Rajendra prasad, shwetha havasthi was announced as one of his subsequent projects.

Krishna from Brundavanam is another project associated with him as director and has been reported as an upcoming production.

== Filmography ==
Year	Film	Notes
2011	Aha Naa Pellanta	Directorial debut
2012	Poola Rangadu	Director
2013	Bhai	Director
2016	Chuttalabbai	Director
2026	Krishna From Brundavanam	In production, subject to confirmation
2026	Dilwala	Upcoming / production status to be verified
2026	Kirathaka	Under production

== As assistant director and co-director ==
Year	Film	Director	Role
1996	Akkada Ammayi Ikkada Abbayi	E. V. V. Satyanarayana	Assistant director
1997	Nenu Premisthunnanu	E. V. V. Satyanarayana	Assistant director
1998	Kanyadaanam	E. V. V. Satyanarayana	Assistant director
1998	Maavidakulu	E. V. V. Satyanarayana	Assistant director
2000	Chala Bagundi	E. V. V. Satyanarayana	Assistant director
2001	Nuvvu Nenu	Teja	Co-director
2001	Family Circus	Teja	Co-director
2002	Jayam	Teja	Co-director
2003	Nijam	Teja	Co-director
2003	Yeh Dil	Teja	Co-director
2004	Shankar Dada M.B.B.S.	Jayanth C. Paranjee	Second-unit director
2005	Danger	Krishna Vamsi	Co-director
2006	Happy	A. Karunakaran	Second-unit director

== Acting ==
Veerabhadram Chowdary has also been associated with the film Highway as an actor. This credit requires an independent source confirming his role.
