= Srinivas Raju =

Indian film director

- Born: Tallapaka, Andhra Pradesh, India
- Occupations: film director, screenwriter

Srinivas Raju is an Indian film director who works in Kannada and Telugu-language cinema. He made his directorial debut with the 2010 Kannada film, Nannavanu. He then followed it up with the Dandupalya franchise, consisting of: Dandupalya (2012), Dandupalya 2 (2017), and Dandupalya 3 (2018). The franchise was written and directed by him. He also directed Kannada actor, Upendra, in Shivam (2015).

== As a director ==
Year	Title	Language	Notes
2010	Nannavanu	Kannada	
2011	Kote	Kannada	
2012	Dandupalya	Kannada	
2015	Shivam	Kannada	
2016	Kathe Chitrakathe Nirdeshana Puttanna	Kannada	
2017	Dandupalya 2	Kannada	
2018	Dandupalya 3	Kannada	
2022	Thaggedele	Telugu	
2024	Krishnam Pranaya Sakhi	Kannada	
2026	Brindavihari	Kannada	
