= Jayadev Mohan =

Indian actor

- Born: Bengaluru, Karnataka, India
- Occupations: Actor, director
- Years active: 2006–present
- Website: www.jayadevmohan.in

Jayadev Mohan, is an Indian actor and director who appears in Kannada and Tamil language films.

== Career ==
Jayadev Mohan began his acting career with drama Agni mattu male, a short play by Girish Karnad. He started his film career with the film Junglee. This was followed up by Dandupalya, a film which is based on the real-life exploits of a notorious gang named Dandupalya, in the film he plays the role of one of the Dandupalya gang members.

Jayadev Mohan is currently acting in film Uttama Villain, an upcoming Tamil comedy film directed by Ramesh Aravind and produced by N. Lingusamy. The film is co-written and co-produced by Kamal Haasan, who himself plays the lead role alongside Jayaram, Andrea Jeremiah, Pooja Kumar, Parvathi and Parvathy Nair. Crazy Mohan writes the film's dialogues while M. Ghibran composes the film's music.

== Filmography ==
Year	Film	Role	Other notes
2012	Dandupalya	Koti Raama	Kannada
2014	Sweety Nanna Jodi	–	Kannada
2014	Uttama Villain	–	Tamil

Junglee – of Jumki fame – by – Duniya Suri
