= Dandupalya =

Village in Karnataka, India

Coordinates: 13°04′N 77°49′E

- village
- Interactive map of Dandupalya
- Country: India
- State: Karnataka
- Taluk: Hoskote

Languages
  - Official: Kannada
- Time zone: UTC+5:30 (IST)

Dandupalya is a village in the taluk of Hoskote in the Bengaluru North district of Karnataka, India. It lies near the Old Madras Road, National Highway 4, about 5 kilometers from the town of Hoskote and an hour's drive from Bangalore.

== Dandupalya gang ==
It has become notorious for the activities of the Dandupalya gang which between about 1996 and 2001 committed murders, rapes, and robberies. The gang numbered about 30 men and women, some of whom lived in Dandupalya. They are thought to have killed more than 80 people. Sixteen death sentences and four sentences of life imprisonment have been given to members of the gang, while others have received shorter prison sentences.

The main Dandupalya gang members belonged to a Kannada-speaking community whose ancestors had migrated from the Karnataka-Andhra border area during the pre-independence era, around 1930. The Dandupalya gang come from line of dacoits starting with their great grandparents committing murders and dacoity. The childhood of Danduplaya gang members was stricken with hunger and bone biting poverty which led to the "dog eat dog" survival instinct. The gang when finally apprehended by the police would take in a surprising amount of physical torture but would break down and confess to their crimes only when lured with food, especially pork.

In 2012 a Kannada film, Dandupalya, was made about the activities of the gang and launched a subsequent franchise.
