= Pandem =

2005 Indian romantic comedy film

- DVD cover
- Directed by: Sabapathy Dekshinamurthy
- Written by: Satish Vegesna (story/dialogues)
- Screenplay by: Sabhapati
- Produced by: Valluripalli Ramesh Babu
- Starring: Jagapati Babu; Kalyani
- Cinematography: Sarath
- Edited by: Basva Paidireddy
- Music by: Chakri
- Production company: Maharshi Cinema
- Release date: 5 February 2005
- Running time: 132 minutes
- Country: India
- Language: Telugu

Pandem (transl. A Bet) is a 2005 Indian Telugu-language romantic comedy film directed by Sabapathy Dekshinamurthy in his Telugu debut. It stars Jagapati Babu, Kalyani and music composed by Chakri. It was dubbed into Hindi as Mera Challenge.

== Cast ==
- Jagapati Babu as Seenu
- Kalyani as Seeta
- Ramaraju as Lingaraju
- Ahuti Prasad as Satya Murthy
- M. S. Narayana as Surinarayana
- Kondavalasa as Jilla Rambabu
- Krishna Bhagawan as Muriki Appala Naidu
- Sivaji Raja as Abbulu
- Chinna as RMP Doctor
- Prudhviraj
- Ravi Varma as Rajesh
- Subbaraya Sharma as Villager
- Sarika Ramchandra Rao as Pamula Narsaiyya
- Chitram Basha
- Jeeva as Police Inspector
- Apoorva
- Mahathi as Pankajam
- Drasharamam Saroja as Saroja
- Lavanya
- Shobha Rani
- Sakhi

== Soundtrack ==
Pandhem

Film score by Chakri
- Released: 2005
- Genre: Soundtrack
- Length: 21:52
- Label: Aditya Music
- Producer: Chakri

Chakri chronology
Dhana 51 (2005)	Pandhem (2005)	Chakram (2005)

Music was composed by Chakri.

No.	Title	Lyrics	Singer(s)	Length
1.	"Kukku Kukku"	Vennelakanti	Hariharan, Kousalya	4:50
2.	"Guppedu Gundela"	Vennelakanti	Chakri, Kousalya	4:36
3.	"Ammadu Gummadu"	Bhaskarabhatla	Shankar Mahadevan, Kousalya	3:45
4.	"Ammalaganna Ammalara"	Sahithi	Adarshini, Matin, Simha, Vasu	4:18
5.	"Abbayo Vayasu"	Kandikonda	Ravi Varma, Sunanda	4:09
Total length:				21:52

== Reception ==
Idlebrain rated the film 3.25 out of 5 stars and noted that "On the whole, Pandem is a minimum guarantee film which you would never regret watching". Full Hyderabad wrote that "But the script is nowhere near taut, and the individual moments of the film completely undo the potential of the plot".
