= Kandikonda =

Indian film lyricist (1973–2022)

- Born: Kandikonda Yadagiri; 13 October 1973; Warangal, Telangana, India
- Died: 12 March 2022 (aged 48); Hyderabad, Telangana, India
- Occupation: Lyricist

Kandikonda (13 October 1973 – 12 March 2022) was an Indian film lyricist known for his works in Telugu cinema. Kandikonda was born in Nagurlapally, Narsampet Mandal, Warangal district. He was awarded a doctorate for his thesis on Situational songs in Telugu cinema from Osmania University.

== Career ==
Kandikonda penned lyrics for over a hundred films in Telugu as well as private albums. Early in his career, he worked for many private and spiritual albums with composer Chakri. His vested interest in Chalam's literature inclined him to pen songs as a lyricist in the Telugu film industry. While working with Chakri, he made his debut into the industry with Malli Kuyave Guvva for Puri Jagannadh's film Itlu Sravani Subramanyam. Thereafter he worked on many songs, including Chupulatho Gucchi Gucchi and Gala Gala Paruthuna. He also wrote a song named Maagani Matti Merupu on the journey towards Telangana statehood. In 2019 he wrote a song Bhogimantalu, Sankrantulu, Kanuma Poojalu Saradalu based on the festival Sankranti. In 2018 he wrote a song about K. T. Rama Rao on his birthday, titled Vachadu Vachadu Oka Leader.

== Personal life and death ==
Kandikonda was a native of Nagurlapally. He died in Hyderabad on 12 March 2022, at the age of 48. He had been battling throat cancer for the two prior years.

== Discography ==
Year	Film	Song name	Music director
2001	Itlu Sravani Subramanyam	Malli kuyave guvva	Chakri
2001	Itlu Sravani Subramanyam	Neekosam vechi	Chakri
2002	Idiot	Chupultho Gucchi gucchi champake	Chakri
2002	Idiot	Eeroje thelisindhi	Chakri
2002	Idiot	Sara Sara Sye	Chakri
2002	Aaduthu Paduthu	Neeli Neeli Muthyamalle	Chakri
2002	Aaduthu Paduthu	Chamaku chamaku	Chakri
2003	Amma Nanna O Tamila Ammayi	Chennai chandhrama	Chakri
2003	Sivamani	Gold rangu pedhavulu	Chakri
2003	Sivamani	Rama rama	Chakri
2003	Sivamani	Sun sun sundhari	Chakri
2003	Satyam	Ori devuda	Chakri
2003	Satyam	Madhurame Madhurame	Chakri
2003	Satyam	I'm in love	Chakri
2004	Andhrawala	Malletheegaroi	Chakri
2004	Andhrawala	Kokkokolamisa	Chakri
2004	Andhrawala	Gicchi gicchi	Chakri
2004	143	Endhukani	Chakri
2004	143	Kalalona	Chakri
2004	143	Orori devuda	Chakri
2004	Donga Dongadi	Bhagya Nagara	Chakri
2004	Donga Dongadi	Sotta Buggala	Chakri
2004	Andharu dongale	Tholi Tholiga	Chakri
2004	Andharu dongale	Manmadhudu	Chakri
2004	Andharu dongale	Kanne Thanam	Chakri
2005	Super	Akkad bakkad bomai po	Sandeep Chowta
2005	Super	Masthana	Sandeep Chowta
2005	Chakram	Sony cellphone	Chakri
2005	Sada Mee Sevalo	Oh Meghamala	Chakri
2005	Sada Mee Sevalo	Hello Hello Madam Suryakantham	Chakri
2005	Bhageeratha	Dilse Karna	Chakri
2005	Allari Pidugu	Chinukulaga	Mani Sharma
2006	Pokiri	Gala gala paruthunna	Mani Sharma
2006	Pokiri	Jagadame	Mani Sharma
2006	Stalin	I wanna spyderman	Mani Sharma
2006	Ranam	Cheli jabili allipokuma	Mani Sharma
2006	Chukkallo Chandrudu	Navvuthu Cellphone Laga	Chakri
2006	Pogaru (Dubbed version)	Rabba rabba	Yuvan Shankar Raja
2006	Shock	Cycle ekki	Ajay-Atul
2006	Seetha Ramudu	Cheli Chemanthale Pooche	Ramana Gogula
2006	Seetha Ramudu	Life antha	Ramana Gogula
2006	Seetha Ramudu	Thakadhimi	Ramana Gogula
2007	Desamuduru	Ninne Ninne	Chakri
2007	Desamuduru	Manasule	Chakri
2007	Takkari	Ammi Ammi	Chakri
2007	Takkari	Kobbari Kobbari	Chakri
2007	Takkari	Yele Yele	Chakri
2007	Takkari	Nacho Nacho	Chakri
2007	Takkari	Aa Aa Aa	Chakri
2007	Takkari	Yele Yelele	Chakri
2007	Munna	Manasa	Harris Jayaraj
2007	Munna	Bhaga bhaga	Harris Jayaraj
2007	Chirutha	You are my chocobar	Mani Sharma
2007	Dhee	Kanupapaku	Chakri
2008	Bujjigadu	Manasunte Chala	Sandeep Chowta
2008	Neninthe	Nuvvante chacchentha picchi	Chakri
2008	Neninthe	Veluge varsham	Chakri
2008	Mr. Medhavi	Kala Kaadugaa	Chakri
2008	Mr. Medhavi	O Maguvaa	Chakri
2008	Mr. Medhavi	Neeli Kanula	Chakri
2008	Mr. Medhavi	Kallu Kallatho	Chakri
2008	Mr. Medhavi	Neeti Chinuku	Chakri
2008	Mr. Medhavi	Love You Raa	Chakri
2008	Mr. Medhavi	Ningi Nela	Chakri
2008	Maska	Hare Hare Rama	Chakri
2008	Maska	Gunde Godarila	Chakri
2008	Maska	Kalloki Dilloki	Chakri
2008	Maska	Kalagannana Kalagannana	Chakri
2008	Maska	Aa Vaipunna Ee Vaipunna	Chakri
2008	Maska	Bhagdad Gajadongai Vasta	Chakri
2008	Aadavari Matalaku Arthale Verule	Cheli chemaku kanulu	Yuvan Shankar Raja
2008	Lakshmi Putrudu	Em Chusi Nanne Nuvvu	D. Imman
2008	Lakshmi Putrudu	Zee Bhoom Baa	D. Imman
2008	Lakshmi Putrudu	Sawariya Sawariya	D. Imman
2008	Lakshmi Putrudu	Ekkadunna Tension Mama	D. Imman
2008	Lakshmi Putrudu	Adigadigo Toofan	D. Imman
2008	Lakshmi Putrudu	Em Smile Raa	D. Imman
2010	Baava	Mila Mila	Chakri
2010	Baava	Nagara Nagara	Chakri
2010	Saradaga Kasepu	Nee palukula	Chakri
2010	Yemaindi Ee Vela	Thunigalle	Chakri
2010	Yemaindi Ee Vela	Nuvvu Ani	Chakri
2011	Babloo	Theme Song	Chakri
2011	Babloo	Thappo Oppo	Chakri
2011	Babloo	Chikna Chikna	Chakri
2011	Babloo	Nee Navve	Chakri
2011	Babloo	Okkasari	Chakri
2011	Babloo	Nee Intiperu	Chakri
2012	Devaraya	Halale Halale	Chakri
2012	Srimannarayana	Halale Halale	Chakri
2012	Thuppakki	Thakathai thakathai	Chakri
2012	Thuppakki	Alaika Alaika	Chakri
2012	Thuppakki	Chinni Chinni	Chakri
2012	Lovely	Lovely lovely	Anoop Rubens
2012	Poola Rangadu	Okkade Okkade	Anoop Rubens
2013	Sukumarudu	Thongi Thongi	Anoop Rubens
2014	Hello Premisthara	Ninna Monna	Chakri
2014	Hello Premisthara	Yennadu Leni	Chakri
2014	Hello Premisthara	Nee Peru Vintene	Chakri
2014	Hello Premisthara	Life Ante Travel	Chakri
2014	Hello Premisthara	Pokiri	Chakri
2014	Hello Premisthara	Dum Dum Dum	Chakri
2014	Lingaa (Dubbed version)	Mona Mona	A. R. Rahman
2016	Temper	One More Time	Anup Rubens
2018	Needi Naadi Oke Katha	Edho Jarigem	Suresh Bobbili
2018	Needi Naadi Oke Katha	Parvathi Tanayudivo	Suresh Bobbili
2022	Kothala Rayudu	O Thalapai	Sunil Kashyap
