= Neninthe =

- Directed by: Puri Jagannadh
- Written by: Puri Jagannadh
- Produced by: D. V. V. Danayya
- Starring: Ravi Teja; Siya Gautham; Supreeth
- Narrated by: Puri Jagannadh
- Cinematography: Shyam K. Naidu
- Edited by: M. R. Varma
- Music by: Chakri
- Production company: Universal Media
- Distributed by: Vaishno Academy
- Release date: 19 December 2008
- Country: India
- Language: Telugu
- Budget: ₹18 crore (US$1.9 million)
- Box office: ₹28 crore (US$2.9 million)

Neninthe (transl. I am like this) is a 2008 Indian Telugu-language action drama film written and directed by Puri Jagannadh and produced by D. V. V. Danayya under his banner Universal Media. The film features Ravi Teja and Siya Gautam in the lead roles, while Supreeth, Subbaraju, and Brahmanandam play supporting roles. The music is composed by Chakri with cinematography by Shyam K. Naidu and editing by M. R. Varma.

The film released on 19 December 2008 and was average at the box office. However, the film won three Nandi Awards and eventually gained cult status. The movie was dubbed in Hindi as Ek Aur Vinashak (2009).

== Plot ==
Ravikumar "Ravi" works as an assistant director for director Idly Viswanath in the Telugu film industry. During the shooting, Ravi meets Sandhya, a group dancer. Sandhya's sister Surekha marries Rambabu, who harasses her only to exploit Sandhya. Ravi narrates an interesting story to producer Shankar, but the latter is not ready to take the risk with a debutante director like Ravi after suffering failures previously.

Meanwhile, a rich goon Yadu, who usurps prime lands, casts his eyes on Sandhya, and Rambabu tries to make use of this in his favor. At this juncture, Ravi narrates the story to hero Mallik, who also expresses his doubts regarding its feasibility. When Ravi pleads for a chance, he agrees for a trial shoot, and they seek the help of Sandhya and other friends. Popular director V. V. Vinayak asks Ravi for a heroine. Having seen Sandhya's performance in the trial shoot, he books her.

When Sandhya becomes a heroine, Rambabu ignores Yadu. Mallik, impressed with the trial shoot, convinces Shankar, who had suffered much loss due to Vishwanath's film. The film shooting begins with Mallik as the hero and Sandhya as the heroine. At this time, an item dancer Mumaith, who had an affair with Mallik, attempts suicide and is raped by two of Yadu's men while being taken to the hospital by her assistant. As a result, the project lands in trouble after the junior artists and the financier walk out of the project. Yadu comes forward to finance the project. After learning who raped Mumaith, Ravi beats the two men at the night Once the shooting is over, Ravi finds his name missing in the titles. Eventually, he teaches Yadu a lesson and replaces the name.

== Cast ==
- Ravi Teja as Ravikumar
- Siya Gautam as Sandhya
- Supreeth as Yadhu
- Subbaraju as Mallik
- Brahmanandam as Idly Vishwanatham
- Sayaji Shinde as Shankar, film producer
- M. S. Narayana as Co-Director
- Rama Prabha as Rajyam (Ravi's mother)
- Mumaith Khan as Mumaith
- Kovai Sarala as Urmila
- Raghu Babu as Raghu, Ravikumar's friend
- Surekha Vani as Surekha
- Krishna Bhagawan as Rambabu
- Abhinaya as Aditri, Shankar's daughter
- Venu Madhav as Sathibabu/Senthil/Venu
- Uttej as Bhaskar, Shankar's assistant
- Satyam Rajesh as Rajesh
- Sairam Shankar as Sai
- Raja Ravindra
- Harish Shankar (cameo appearance)
- V. V. Vinayak (cameo appearance)
- Kona Venkat (cameo appearance)
- Chakri (cameo appearance)

== Soundtrack ==
Neninthe

Soundtrack album by Chakri
- Released: 7 December 2008
- Recorded: 2008
- Genre: Soundtrack
- Length: 24:55
- Label: Aditya Music
- Producer: Chakri

Chakri chronology
| Nagaram (2008) | Neninthe (2008) | Maska (2009) |

The music was composed by Chakri and released by Aditya Music. The song "Oh I Miss You" is based on "Miss You" from Insomniac.

Track list
| No. | Title | Lyrics | Singer(s) | Length |
|---|---|---|---|---|
| 1. | "Krishna Nagarey" | Bhaskarabhatla Ravi Kumar | Chakri | 4:39 |
| 2. | "Puduthuney Uyyala" | Bhuvana Chandra | Chakri, Geetha Madhuri | 5:17 |
| 3. | "Veluguley" | Kandikonda | Chakri, Kousalya | 4:20 |
| 4. | "Nuvantene Pichchi" | Kandikonda | Chakri, Nilayini | 5:19 |
| 5. | "Oh I Miss U" | Ramajogayya Sastry | Raghu Kunche | 5:20 |
| Total length: | | | | 24:55 |

== Reception ==
Jeevi of Idlebrain.com wrote that "Overall, Neninthe is more like a personal film made from Puri Jagan’s personal experiences". A critic from The Times of India wrote that "Director Puri Jagannath widely covers the opinions of the film fraternity including fans but somewhere lost his way in churning out a money-spinner".

== Awards ==
Nandi Awards - 2008

- Best Actor - Ravi Teja
- Best Dialogue Writer - Puri Jagannadh
- Best Fight Master - Ram-Lakshman
