= Andaru Dongale Dorikite =

2004 Telugu film

- Movie Poster
- Directed by: Nidhi Prasad
- Written by: Chintapalli Ramana (Dialogues)
- Screenplay by: Nidhi Prasad
- Produced by: Harsha Reddy
- Starring: Rajendra Prasad; Prabhu Deva; Kiran Rathod; Ankitha; K.Nagababu
- Cinematography: Sarath
- Edited by: Shankar
- Music by: Chakri
- Production company: Geo Media
- Release date: 18 June 2004
- Running time: 155 minutes
- Country: India
- Language: Telugu

Andaru Dongale Dorikite (transl. Everyone are Thieves when they are Caught) is a 2004 Indian Telugu-language comedy film, produced by Geo Media and directed by Nidhi Prasad. It stars Rajendra Prasad and Prabhu Deva in lead roles with Kiran Rathod, Ankitha and K.Nagababu playing supporting roles.The music is composed by Chakri. The movie was based on the 1997 movie Excess Baggage.

== Cast ==
- Rajendra Prasad as Bangaru Raju
- Prabhu Deva as Bujji (Voice dubbed by Sivaji)
- Kiran Rathod as Naveena
- Ankitha as Usha
- K. Nagababu as KK
- Brahmanandam as C.Co
- Ali as Shohebastar
- M. S. Narayana as Truck Driver
- Mallikharjuna Rao as Sivamani
- Giri Babu as Bujji's father
- Raghu Babu as Simhadri
- Krishna Bhagavaan as Indra
- Surya as Pushparaj
- Jeeva as Khadir
- Jenny as Pushparaj's father
- Banerjee as Inspector Shyam
- G. V. Sudhakar Naidu as Chi.La.Sow.Suryakantham's brother
- Narsing Yadav
- Kishore Das as Dhaba Owner
- Junior Relangi
- Kavitha as Bujji's mother
- Kovai Sarala as Chi.La.Sow.Suryakantham
- Jyothi as Bipasa

== Soundtrack ==
Andaru Dongale Dorikithe

Film score by Chakri
- Released: 10 June 2004
- Genre: Soundtrack
- Length: 27:37
- Label: Madhura Entertainments
- Producer: Chakri

Chakri chronology
143 (2004)	Andaru Dongale Dorikithe (2004)	Konchem Touchlo Vunte Cheputanu (2004)

Music composed by Chakri. Music released on Madhura Entertainments Audio Company.

No.	Title	Lyrics	Singer(s)	Length
1.	"Gumma Gumma"	Bhaskarabhatla	Simha	4:42
2.	"Toli Toliga"	Kandikonda	Chakri, Chaitra Ambadipudi	4:33
3.	"Manmadhuda"	Kandikonda	Revathi	4:10
4.	"Kannethanam Vannethanam"	Kandikonda	Tippu, Smita	4:35
5.	"Dongala Story"	Bhaskarabhatla	Ravi Varma, Chakri	4:50
6.	"Gun Gunare"	Sahithi	Sunanda Charki	4:47
Total length:				27:37

== Reception ==
Full Hyderabad wrote "First up, all the people who expect to recapture the comic magic of the past, and relive the brilliant entertainment of Rajendra Prasad movies through this movie must realize that the ticket is NON-REFUNDABLE". Idlebrain wrote "It's a pretty heavy task to make such a small storyline into a 15-reel film. The director has partly succeeded in making this film as a comedy fare. However, there are quite a few loose ends and boring moments, especially the jungle episodes and chases towards the climax". Telugu Cinema wrote "This is nidhi prasad’s third venture. He is experimenting with others money. He needs to attend some direction school before he attempts another film. The film has some good movements, but over all it is boring".
