= Idiot (2002 film) =

2002 Indian film by Puri Jagannadh

- Directed by: Puri Jagannadh
- Written by: Puri Jagannadh
- Based on: Appu (Kannada)
- Produced by: Puri Jagannadh
- Starring: Ravi Teja; Rakshita
- Cinematography: Shyam K. Naidu
- Edited by: Marthand K. Venkatesh
- Music by: Chakri
- Production company: Vaishno Academy
- Release date: 22 August 2002
- Running time: 133 minutes
- Country: India
- Language: Telugu
- Box office: ₹16 crore distributors' share

Idiot: O Chanti Gaadi Prema Katha (lit. 'Idiot: Chanti's love story') is a 2002 Indian Telugu-language action romantic comedy film which released on 22 August 2002 and was directed by Puri Jagannadh. It was the second collaboration between Ravi Teja and Puri Jagannadh after the successful film Itlu Sravani Subramanyam. The dialogue was written by Puri Jagannadh with soundtrack by Chakri. This film stars Ravi Teja and Rakshita (in her Telugu debut, reprising her role from original). It turned out to be a blockbuster. The film ran for 100 days in 36 centres. The film was a remake of director's own 2002 Kannada movie Appu.

== Plot ==
Bhaskar Rao a.k.a. Chantigadu is the son of a head constable Venkata Sami. Chanti is a guy with a carefree attitude. He is beaten by a rival gang at night and is rescued by a beautiful girl, Suchitra. She pays his hospital bills and donates her blood. She is gone from the hospital by the time Chanti becomes conscious. When Chanti's friends inform him about the girl who rescued him, he starts loving her immediately for her goodheartedness, though he did not see her. Suchi later turns out to be the daughter of the city police commissioner Vipra Narayana.

Chanti meets Suchi in the college for the first time and expresses his love. When she does not agree, he tries to tease her. She complains to her father, and he takes Chanti to the police station and severely beats him before being rescued by his father and his fellow constables. Even though Chanti is beaten by Narayana, he becomes more adamant to win his ladylove. He proposes to Suchi again in the college. She asks him to jump from the building. When he is ready to do so, she agrees to his love.

However, Narayana is not happy about their relationship and ropes in some rowdies to amputate his leg. Suchi discovers this and runs to help him, but is met with an accident. Both of them get admitted to the same hospital, and they unite there also. Narayana finally arranges her marriage with another person, to which she openly opposes and tries to commit suicide. Chanti comes and rescues her, but Narayana still wants to get her married to a man of his own choice. He also engages goons to kill Chanti. Chanti finally escapes all the troubles and meets the DGP to help him to marry his love. The DGP finally suspends Narayana and arranges Chanti's marriage in the police station. Finally, Chanti appears for civil services and is selected for IPS.

== Cast ==
- Ravi Teja as Bhaskar Rao a.k.a. Chantigadu
- Rakshita as Suchitra a.k.a. Suchi
- Prakash Raj as Police Commissioner Vipra Narayana
- Kota Srinivasa Rao as Head Constable Venkata Swamy
- Sangeetha as Rajyalakshmi, Chanti's mother
- Ali as Motorcycle thief
- Kaikala Satyanarayana as Seetha Ramaiah; DGP
- Giri Babu as Police Officer
- Jeeva as Police Officer
- Pruthviraj as Police Officer
- Jr. Relangi as Police Officer
- Vidya Vathi as Chanti's sister
- Sairam Shankar as Sai, Chanti's friend
- Srinivasa Reddy as Chanti's friend
- MS Narayana as College Principal
- Narsing Yadav as Yadav

== Production ==
This is a remake of the Kannada film Appu directed by Puri Jagannath which was the debut movie of Puneeth Rajkumar.

== Soundtrack ==
Idiot

Soundtrack album by Chakri
- Released: 16 August 2002
- Recorded: 2002
- Genre: Soundtrack
- Length: 29:02
- Label: Aditya Music
- Producer: Chakri

Chakri chronology
Avunu Valliddaru Ista Paddaru (2002)	Idiot (2002)	Ammayilu Abbayilu (2003)

The music was composed by Chakri, and the soundtrack was released under the Sohan Audio label. It consists of six tracks. The tune of the song "Jai Veeranjaneya" was based on the song "Kolumande Jangama" from the 1996 Kannada film Janumada Jodi. The song "Choopultho Guchi" was based on the song Sawan Mein Lag Gaye Aag from the 1998 Punjabi pop album of the same name and the beginning portions were reused from "Taliban Alla Alla" from Appu.The song "Ee Roje Thelisindi" was sampled by Bulgarian pop-folk singer Emilia in her song "Ti si mi".

Track list
No.	Title	Lyrics	Singer(s)	Length
1.	"Sye Sara Sye"	Kandikonda	Chakri	4:50
2.	"Choopultho Guchi"	Kandikonda	Shankar Mahadevan	4:29
3.	"Cheliya Cheliya"	Peddada Murthy	Ravi Varma	5:19
4.	"Ee Roje"	Kandikonda	Kousalya	4:52
5.	"Le Letha"	Bhaskarabhatla Ravi Kumar	Udit Narayan, Kousalya	5:07
6.	"Jai Veeranjaneya"	Bhaskarabhatla Ravi Kumar	Raghu Kunche	4:25
Total length:				29:02

== Reception ==
A critic from Idlebrain.com rated the film 4/5 stars and wrote, "Idiot is a good film to watch for everybody". A critic from Sify wrote, "on the whole the film is a good comedy caper".
