= Sairam Shankar =

Indian actor

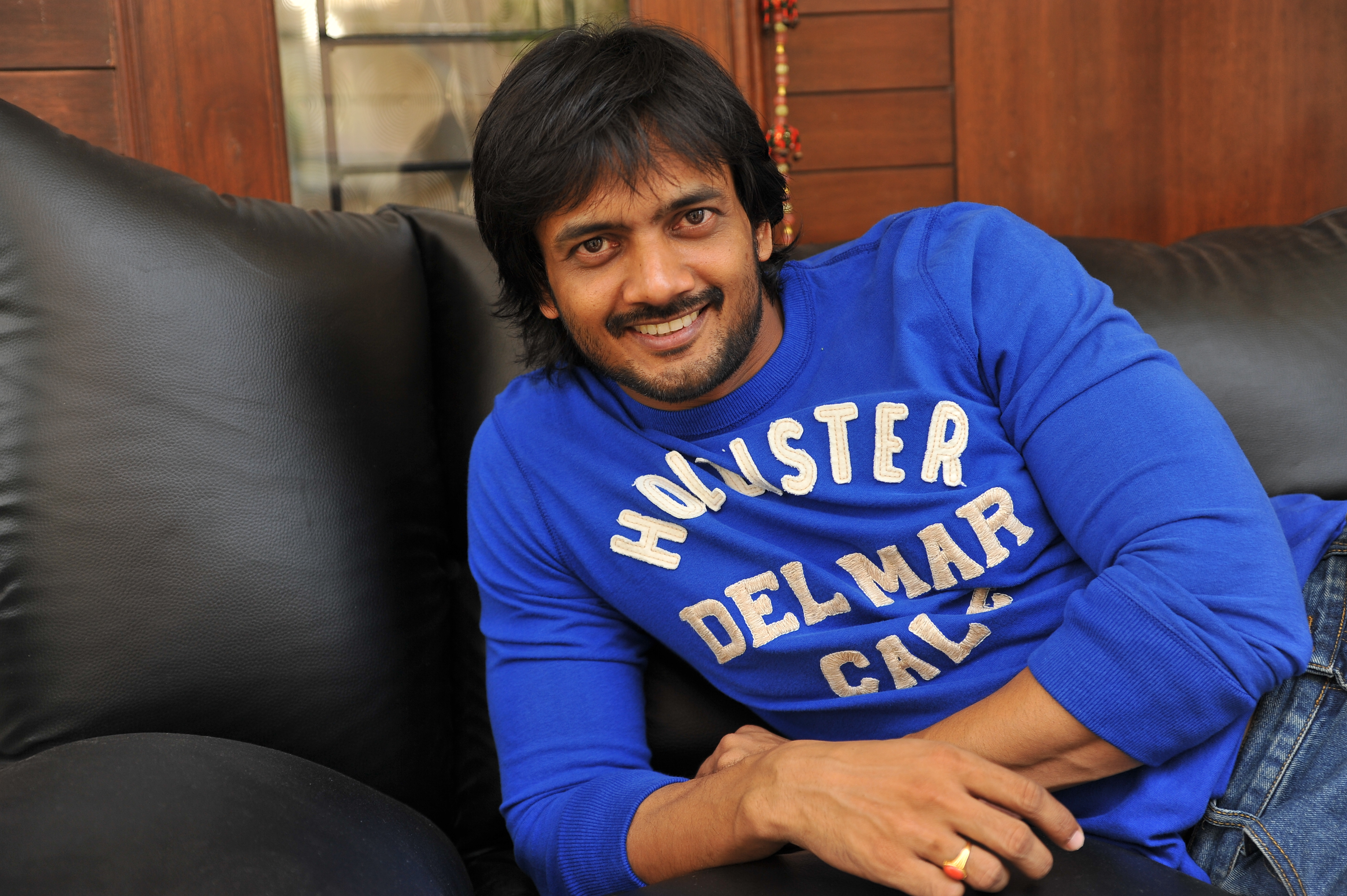
- Shanker in 2013
- Born: Kothapalli, Andhra Pradesh, India
- Occupation: Actor
- Years active: 2002–present
- Relatives: Puri Jagannadh (brother); Petla Uma Sankara Ganesh (brother)

Petla Sairam Shankar is an Indian actor in Telugu cinema. He is the younger brother of Indian film director and producer Puri Jagannadh. He began his acting career as a lead actor in 2004 film 143. He later continued acting in films such as Danger, Neninthe and Bumper Offer.

== Film career ==
Sairam Shankar started his film career by assisting his brother Puri Jagannadh in the direction department. He joined Puri Jagannath as an assistant director in 1997 and assisted him in films such as Badri, Bachi, Itlu Sravani Subramanyam, Idiot, Amma Nanna O Tamila Ammayi and Sivamani. During that time, his interest in films grew and decided to pursue acting as a career. He portrayed a small role in the film Idiot. He was trained in acting at Satyanand Film Institute in Visakhapatnam. While still in training, Puri Jagannadh wanted him to act as the main lead in his next film. In 2004, his first film as the lead actor, 143 produced and directed by Puri Jagannadh was released. Sairam was paired alongside the debutant actress Samiksha and Asha Saini. The film was released to mixed reviews and although Sairam's performance was well received, his dubbing voice was heavily criticized. Few days after the release his voice in the film was replaced by that of Sri. His next acting venture was alongside Allari Naresh, Swati Reddy, Sherin and Abhi in 2005 film Danger, directed by Krishna Vamsi. Sairam was one of the three main lead actors in the film and his performance was well received by the critics. But the film itself was released to negative reviews and was not successful at the box office. In 2007, his next film Hello Premistara, directed by Raj Kumar was released. The film was produced by Puri Jagannadh and had Sheela acting opposite Sairam. Sairam played dual roles in the film and his performance was praised by the critics. The film opened to negative reviews and failed at the box office. In 2008, he was seen in a supporting role in Ravi Teja's Neninthe, directed by Puri Jagannadh.

In 2009, Sairam Shankar had his first success with Bumper Offer, directed by Jaya Ravindra. The film was written and produced by Puri Jagannadh and it had Bindu Madhavi acting opposite Sairam. The year also saw his next release Vade Kavali, directed by Rajendra Darshan. His film titled Yamaho Yama co-starring Srihari, Parvati Melton and Sanjjanaa was released in 2012. He also started filming for a new film titled Romeo, directed by Gopi Ganesh. The film is written by Puri Jagannadh and produced by Valluripalli Ramesh. He also signed a film titled Veyyi Abaddalu under the direction of Teja.

== Filmography ==
=== As actor ===
Key
| † | Denotes films that have not yet been released |

| Year | Title | Role(s) | Notes |
|---|---|---|---|
| 2002 | Idiot | Sai | |
| 2004 | 143 | Siddu | Debut as lead actor |
| 2005 | Danger | Karthik | |
| 2007 | Hello Premistara | Aravind / Arjun | Dual role |
| 2008 | Neninthe | Sai | |
| 2009 | Bumper Offer | Sai | |
| 2009 | Vade Kavali | Anand | |
| 2012 | Yamaho Yama | Balu | |
| 2013 | 1000 Abaddalu | Satya | |
| 2014 | Dillunodu | Sai | |
| 2014 | Romeo | Kittu | |
| 2015 | Vaadu Nenu Kadhu | Sai | |
| 2016 | Araku Road Lo | Pothuraju | |
| 2017 | Nenorakam | Gautham | |
| 2024 | Vey Dharuvey | Shankar | |
| 2025 | Oka Padhakam Prakaram | Siddharth Neelakanta | |

=== Direction department ===
| Year | Title |
|---|---|
| 2000 | Badri |
| 2000 | Bachi |
| 2001 | Itlu Sravani Subramanyam |
| 2002 | Idiot |
| 2003 | Amma Nanna O Tamila Ammayi |
| 2003 | Sivamani |
