= Golimaar (film) =

2010 action film by Puri Jagannadh

- Theatrical release poster
- Directed by: Puri Jagannadh
- Written by: Puri Jagannadh
- Produced by: Bellamkonda Suresh
- Starring: Gopichand; Priyamani; Roja Selvamani
- Cinematography: Shyam K. Naidu
- Edited by: Marthand K. Venkatesh
- Music by: Chakri (songs); Mani Sharma (score)
- Production company: Sri Sai Ganesh Productions
- Release date: 27 May 2010
- Running time: 145 minutes
- Country: India
- Language: Telugu
- Box office: ₹12 crore distributors' share

Golimaar (transl. Shoot the Bullet) is a 2010 Indian Telugu-language action crime film directed by Puri Jagannadh and produced by Bellamkonda Suresh under Sri Sai Ganesh Productions banner. The film stars Gopichand and Priyamani in the lead roles. The soundtrack was composed by Chakri, while the background score was composed by Mani Sharma. It is inspired by the life of Daya Nayak, who was known for his record number of encounter killings in the late 1990s.

Golimaar was released on 27 May 2010 to positive reviews from critics and became a commercial success at the box office. Geetha Madhuri won the Filmfare Award for Best Female Playback Singer for the film's song "Magallu".

== Plot ==
Gangaram is an orphan who grows up to become an honest cop. DIG Bharath Nandan promotes him as an encounter specialist after being impressed with his combat and shooting skills. Gangaram intends to bring down the gangster networks of Talwar, who is operating in the city, and Khalid, who is operating from Malaysia. ACP Patnayak becomes jealous of Gangaram, who starts eliminating criminals with the help of his team and becomes famous for the encounter killings. Eventually, Gangaram attacks Talwar but runs out of ammunition before he can shoot him. Patnayak arrives and arrests him, much to Gangaram's disappointment.

Later, Talwar injures himself in an attempt to escape from the hospital, but Gangaram accompanies and kills him along with his henchmen. Knowing Khalid is in Kenya for a private trip, Gangaram decides to go there to kill him, but the DIG asks him to tender his resignation due to the confidentiality of the operation. While Gangaram is at home with his girlfriend Pavitra, Patnayak and other officers raid his house and arrest him on the charges of syndicate connections. In custody, Gangaram learns from Khalid on the phone that he was used by him and the DIG to eliminate their opponent Talwar. He escapes and explains to the media how he was framed despite his honesty. Gangaram now becomes a gangster named "Gangu Bhai" and starts eliminating Khalid's men and the police officers involved in the encounter attempt on him.

Patnayak arrests and tortures Pavitra to find out Gangaram's location. Learning this, Gangaram gets Patnayak killed by one of his henchmen as Pavitra recovers in the hospital. Pavitra's mother Arundhati is taken away by police officers, and the DIG, who is revealed to be her estranged husband, asks her to make Gangaram spare his life for the sake of Pavitra. However, Arundhati tells him on the phone to kill the DIG, further explaining how he betrayed her and got her falsely arrested. The DIG shoots her dead. Gangaram uses the DIG to find out Khalid's location in Malaysia. After killing the DIG, Gangaram goes to Malaysia, where he makes one of Khalid's henchmen, David, help him in killing other henchmen at gunpoint.

However, Gangaram is beaten up and questioned by Khalid, who believes someone has helped him. Making Khalid suspect his henchmen, Gangaram gets into a fight and kills the henchmen in an ensuing chase. Khalid rushes to a helipad, where Gangaram kills the pilot and fights with Khalid. Khalid reveals he has been living in Malaysia with a Mexican passport under the name of Anthony. Gangaram shoots Khalid dead and informs DGP Prakash (it is revealed that the whole plan was made by Gangaram with Prakash helping him). Gangaram wants to return to India and resume his duties, but Prakash instead tells him to stay there and operate his gang to keep the syndicate under the police. Gangaram agrees and calls his henchmen, Pavitra, to settle in Malaysia.

== Cast ==
- Gopichand as SI Gangaram
- Priyamani as Pavitra
- Roja Selvamani as Arundhati, Pavitra's mother
- Kelly Dorji as Khalid
- Shawar Ali as Talwar
- Nassar as DIG Bharat Nandan
- Mukhtar Khan as ACP Patnayak
- M. S. Narayana as Hotel Babai
- Ali as Gopi
- Jeeva as a police constable
- Satyam Rajesh as Rajesh
- Pruthviraj as Laxmikant Reddy
- Salim Baig as David, Khalid's henchman
- Pavala Syamala as a maid
- Junior Relangi as man at the grocery shop
- Dheer Charan Srivastav as a pimp
- Prakash Raj as DGP Prakash Raj (extended cameo appearance)

== Soundtrack ==
Golimaar

Soundtrack album by Chakri
- Released: 5 May 2010
- Recorded: 2010
- Genre: Soundtrack
- Length: 24:15
- Label: Aditya Music
- Producer: Chakri

Chakri chronology
Simha (2010)	Golimaar (2010)	Aakasa Ramanna (2010)

The soundtrack was composed by Chakri, while the lyrics were written by Bhaskarabhatla. The soundtrack was released by ADITYA Music Company. The music was released on 5 May at a function organized in Club Jayabheri. The song "Magallu" is based on the Italian song "L'Italiano".

No.	Title	Singer(s)	Length
1.	"Gundello Edo Sadi"	Chakri, Kousalya	4:12
2.	"Theenmaar"	Mumaith Khan	2:19
3.	"Magallu"	Geetha Madhuri	3:51
4.	"Golimaar"	Chakri	5:17
5.	"Salaam Police"	Simha	4:13
6.	"Nidharosthale"	Vasu	4:03
Total length:			24:15

== Production ==
After delivering an average grosser in the form of Ek Niranjan, Puri Jagannath announced that his next project is titled Golimaar (గోలీమార్) with Gopichand playing the role of an encounter specialist. Hansika Motwani was originally announced as heroine, but the actress denied being part of this film and was replaced by Priyamani. Shooting started on 21 December 2009 at Jubilee hills in Hyderabad.

== Awards ==
Filmfare Awards

Won

- Best Female Playback Singer - Geetha Madhuri - "Magallu"
- Best Supporting Actress - Roja Selvamani
- Best Lyricist - Bhaskarbatla Ravi Kumar - "Gundello Edo Sadi"

== Release ==
The film received an "A" certificate from the CBFC.

=== Critical reception ===
Fullhyd.com gave the film 3.5/5 and praised the construction of Gopichand's character, action sequences, dialogues and writing, but criticized the "done-to-death villainy and the predictability of the script." 123Telugu gave 3.25/5 stars and wrote "If you could call Desperado a stylish take on a ‘Western Spaghetti’, you could as well call this film a typical 'Telugu Film Style' take on a cop story! Go watch it." Telugu cinema wrote "Golimaar is strictly okay. Nothing new, nothing exciting. Just plain, ordinary, masala action film from Puri." Rediff wrote "All in all, Golimaar is a full on masala film." Sify wrote "Golimaar unleashes a feel among the audience that the gap between the thoughts of Puri Jagan and their reach with the spectators is widening with each film."

=== Box-office ===
The film was said to be completed 50 days in 79 centres.

== Home Video ==
The Hindi-dubbed version was released on DVD, VCD and also on YouTube by Aditya Music in 2011. The Telugu version was made available to stream on Sun NXT.
