= Razole, Konaseema district =

Razole Razolu
- Village
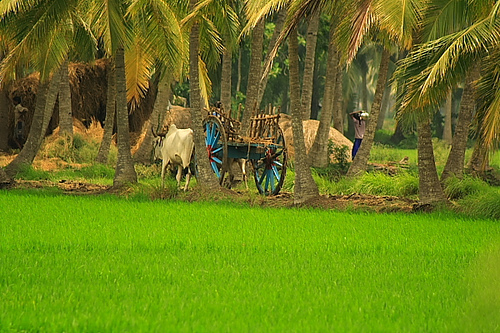
- Scenic Greenery by Kotikalapudi
- Interactive map of Razole
- Location in Andhra, Pradesh, India
- Coordinates: 16.474326°N 81.840196°E
- Country: India
- State: Andhra Pradesh
- District: Dr. B.R. Ambedkar Konaseema
- Talukas: Razole

Government
  - MLA: Rapaka Vara Prasada Rao

Population (2011)
  - Total: 13,597

Languages
  - Official: Telugu
- Time zone: UTC+5:30 (IST)
- PIN: 533242
- Telephone code: 08862
- Vehicle Registration: AP05 (Former); AP39 (from 30 January 2019)
- Nearest city: Palakollu

Razole, natively known as Razolu, is a village in Dr. B.R. Ambedkar Konaseema district of Andhra Pradesh, India. The town is surrounded by the river Vashishta (Godavari) and is known for its coconut and palm trees. Several Tollywood directors have used the region around Razole as a backdrop for films, including Ladies Tailor, Chanti, Kabaddi Kabaddi, and Vinayakudu. The resort of Dindi is located on the banks of the Godavari.

Razole has a good number of schools. ZP Boys high school is the oldest, celebrating its 100th year anniversary in 2018. Sobhana High school, Narayana e-Techno, Ravindra Bharathi, and Akshara are the most popular schools in the locality.

Sobhana and Ravindra Bharathi are the oldest of all these schools.

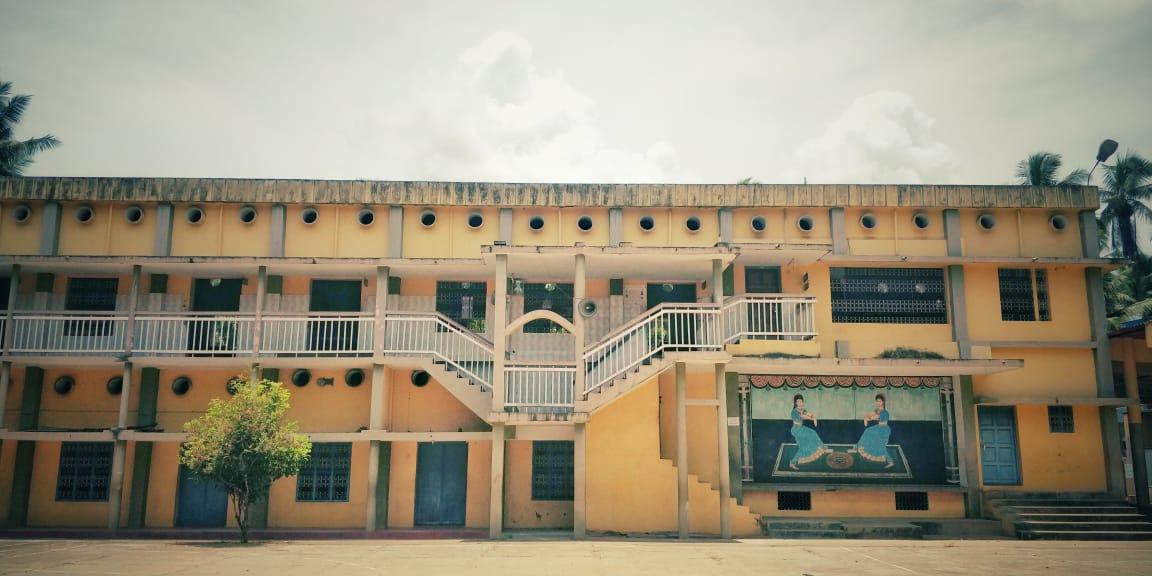
Sobhana English medium high school

When it comes to colleges in Razole, the town is home for colleges like Sri Chaitanya junior college, Narayana college, Andhrapradesh social welfare college (gurukul) and Government junior & degree college, Razole.

== Notable people ==
- Sukumar: Director
- Vamsy: Director
- Anjali: Actress
- Hema: character artist
- Bandaru Ayyappa: IPL Cricketer represents Andhra in Ranji Trophy

== Assembly ==
Razole is one of the 175 Assembly Constituencies in Andhra Pradesh. The current MLA is Deva Vara prasad from Jana Sena Party.
