= Yamaho Yama =

- Directed by: Jithender Yadagiri
- Written by: Jithender Yadagiri
- Produced by: G. Vijay Kumar
- Starring: Sairam Shankar; Parvati Melton; Srihari; Sanjjana
- Cinematography: Bharani K. Dharan
- Edited by: Marthand K. Venkatesh
- Music by: Mahathi
- Distributed by: GVK Arts
- Release date: 14 December 2012
- Running time: 142 minutes
- Country: India
- Language: Telugu

Yamaho Yama (transl. Oh Yama, It's Yama) is a 2012 Telugu language fantasy comedy film starring Sairam Shankar, Parvati Melton, Srihari and Sanjjana and directed by Jithender Yadagiri. The movie is dubbed in Hindi as Qatilon Ka Qatil.

== Plot ==
Balu (Sairam Shankar) is a young lad who is fated to die at the age of 25, as per his horoscope. In order to prevent this, his grandmother (Rama Prabha) makes him a devotee of Lord Yama (Srihari) in order to avert this. As Balu approaches the age of 25 years, Ram Prabha decides to send the young lad to USA. Balu roams around without any responsibilities and ends up as a good for nothing lad. In order to mend Balu's ways, none other than Lord Yama enters the fray. He decides to travel to the US and help out the kid. But even the great Yama fails to mend Balu and that is when he realises that Balu needs to fall in love to become a better person. He makes Balu fall in love with Swapna (Parvati Melton) and the rest of the movie is about how Balu becomes a better person.

== Cast ==
- Sairam Shankar as Balu
- Parvati Melton as Swapna
- Srihari as Yama
- Sanjjana as Nisha
- Sithara as Yama's wife
- Prabhakar
- M. S. Narayana as Chitragupta
- Rama Prabha as Balu's grandmother
- Siva Reddy as Balu's friend
- Thagubothu Ramesh
- Telangana Shakuntala
- Narsing Yadav

== Reception ==
=== Critical response ===
A reviewer of 123Telugu says "This film will test your patience and insult your intelligence. Avoid it unless you want to experience visual torture". Ch Sushil Rao from The Times of India wrote "Sai Ram Shankar steals the show as he performs with ease – both in his role, dance and fights. But he should know it is the 'Statue of Liberty' and not 'Liberty of statue' in the US". Prasad from India Herald wrote "There are uncountable scenes of this kind which never stop testing your patience’s until you reach last 15 minutes of this movie.Entire technical team is big minus points to this flick".
