= Rechipo =

2009 Indian film by Parachuri Murali

- Film poster
- Directed by: Parachuri Murali
- Written by: Parachuri Murali
- Produced by: G. V. Ramana
- Starring: Nithiin; Ileana D'Cruz; Ahuti Prasad
- Cinematography: T. Surendra Reddy
- Edited by: Kotagiri Venkateswara Rao
- Music by: Mani Sharma
- Release date: 25 September 2009
- Country: India
- Language: Telugu

Rechipo (transl. Rock It) is a 2009 Indian Telugu-language romantic action comedy film, starring Nithiin and Ileana D'Cruz. The film is produced by G. V. Ramana, cinematography by T. Surendra Reddy and directed by Parachuri Murali. The film released on 25 September 2009. Later, it was dubbed into Tamil as Dhana and Hindi as Aaj Ka Naya Khiladi (2010). The film was a box office bomb.

== Cast ==
- Nithiin as Siva
- Ileana D'Cruz as Krishnaveni
- Bhanu Chander as Police Commissioner
- Sunil as Sunil, Siva's friend
- MS Narayana as Naryana
- Raghu Babu as Zimbabwe a.k.a. Kasai
- Ramaprabha as Aunt Thangamma
- Prabha as Vasundara, Siva's mother
- Sarath Babu as Shankar Rao, Siva's father
- Nalini as Kancha Kanakaratnam, Krishnaveni's mother
- Ahuti Prasad as Prasad Home Minister, Krishnaveni's father
- Nadhiya as Prabhavati, Siva's aunt
- Tanikella Bharani as Bharani, Siva's uncle
- Suman Shetty as Suman
- Shawar Ali as Mafia Don Shukkur Ahmed
- Karuna Bhusan as Krishnaveni's friend
- Hema as Hema
- Sravan as Jaleel Bhai
- Venu Madhav as Venu
- Prudhvi Raj as Police Officer

== Soundtrack ==
Rechipo

Soundtrack album by Mani Sharma
- Released: 10 September 2009
- Recorded: 2009
- Genre: Feature film soundtrack
- Length: 26:25
- Language: Telugu
- Label: Supreme Music
- Producer: Mani Sharma

Mani Sharma chronology
Ek Niranjan (2009)	Rechipo (2009)	Baanam (2009)

The songs were composed by Mani Sharma.

All lyrics are written by Bhaskarabhatla.

Track-List
No.	Title	Artist(s)	Length
1.	"Bhayam"	Rahul Nambiar	03:36
2.	"O Rori"	Venu, Geetha Madhuri	04:51
3.	"Tholi Tholiga"	Ranjith, Swetha	04:26
4.	"Gaalaina"	Hemachandra, Malavika	05:17
5.	"Ettuko"	Geetha Madhuri	04:07
6.	"Pathikella"	Ranjith, Saindhavi	04:08
Total length:			26:25
