= Satyam (2003 film) =

- Directed by: Surya Kiran
- Written by: Surya Kiran; Dialogues: Sateesh-Ravi
- Produced by: Nagarjuna
- Starring: Sumanth; Genelia; Kota Srinivasa Rao
- Cinematography: Sameer Reddy; Raja
- Edited by: Nandamuri Hari
- Music by: Chakri
- Production company: Annapurna Studios
- Release date: 19 December 2003
- Running time: 144 minutes
- Country: India
- Language: Telugu

Satyam is a 2003 Indian Telugu-language romantic drama film directed by debutant Surya Kiran and produced by actor Nagarjuna under Annapurna Studios banner. The film stars Nagarjuna's nephew Sumanth as the titular character alongside Genelia, marking her debut in Telugu cinema. The film was released on 19 December 2003 to positive reviews and was a box office success. It was one of the biggest successes in Sumanth's career. Chakri won the Filmfare Award for Best Male Playback Singer – Telugu. It was remade in Bengali language as Shakti.

== Plot ==
Satyam is an aspiring songwriter who inadvertently gets misunderstood both by his father Vishwanath and his love interest Ankita. He ghostwrites for a selfish and popular film lyricist. He decides to prove himself as an independent songwriter before expressing his love to Ankita. In the meantime, a classmate of Ankita proposes to her. Through all of this, Ankita's father Shankar, unexpectedly befriends Satyam without his daughter's knowledge. Satyam eventually overcomes his obstacles and succeeds in reconciling with his father and Ankita.

== Cast ==
- Sumanth as Satyam
- Genelia as Ankita
- Kota Srinivasa Rao as Shankar
- Bramhanandam as Lingam
- Rajesh as Satish Petla
- Tanikella Bharani as Chakradhar
- Raghava Malladi as Viswanath
- Kondavalasa as Simhadri
- Varsha as Swati
- Sridhar as Prakash
- Narsing Yadav as MLA
- Duvvasi Mohan as Chakradhar's assistant
- Gautam Raju
- Apoorva as Lingam's wife
- Kanta Rao (Cameo appearance)
- Chakri as himself (Cameo appearance)
- Raghava Lawrence as himself (Special appearance in the song "Kuch Kuch")

== Production ==
In mid-2000, Sumanth signed three films included one that was to be produced by Annapoorna Studios with Ezhil considered as a potential director. Sumanth wanted Genelia D'Souza to be a part of the film after seeing of one her ads.

== Soundtrack ==
Satyam

Film score by Chakri
- Released: 3 December 2003
- Recorded: 2003
- Genre: Soundtrack
- Length: 26:35
- Producer: Chakri

Chakri chronology
| Sivamani (2003) | Satyam (2003) | Toli Choopulone (2003) |

The music was composed by Chakri. The audio launch function took place on 3 December 2003 at Annapoorna Studios with Akkineni Nageswara Rao attending the event as the chief guest.

| No. | Title | Lyrics | Singer(s) | Length |
|---|---|---|---|---|
| 1. | "O Maguva" | Bhaskarabhatla | Chakri | 5:57 |
| 2. | "Kuch Kuch" | Viswa | Viswa, Kousalya | 5:24 |
| 3. | "Mokka Jonna" | Rajesh, Venkata Ramana | Venkata Ramana, Surya Kiran | 2:46 |
| 4. | "Madhurame Madhurame" | Kandikonda | Shankar Mahadevan | 4:38 |
| 5. | "I Am in Love" | Kandikonda | Venu | 5:39 |
| 6. | "Pilichina Palakadu Prema" | Bhaskarabhatla | Ravi Varma, Chakri | 5:18 |
| 7. | "Ori Devuda" | | | 5:18 |
| Total length: | | | | 26:35 |

== Release and reception ==
The film was released in 22 centers and was a success.

Jeevi of Idlebrain.com rated the film 3.25/5 and wrote, "Director Soorya Kiran makes a mark for himself through Sathyam. Hero Sumanth's proves himself as a perfectionist". A critic from Sify wrote, "The storyline though wafer-thin has been technically well shot and Sumanth has done his best to look convincing as Satyam".
