= Romeo (2014 film) =

- Poster
- Directed by: Gopiganesh Pattabhi
- Written by: Puri Jagannadh
- Produced by: Dorai Swamy
- Starring: Sairam Shankar; Adonika
- Cinematography: P. G. Vinda
- Edited by: Naveen Nooli
- Music by: Sunil Kashyap
- Release date: 10 October 2014
- Country: India
- Language: Telugu

Romeo (Telugu: రోమియో) is a 2014 Telugu drama film starring Sairam Shankar and Adonika in the lead, directed by Gopiganesh Pattabhi. Valluripalli Ramesh produced this movie under the Maharshi Cinema Banner and Sunil Kashyap provided the music for the film. The film released after much delay.

== Cast ==
- Sairam Shankar as Kittu
- Adonika as Madhoo
- Subbaraju
- Pragathi
- Ali
- Ravi Teja as himself (cameo appearance)

== Production ==
The film is set in Verona, the same place where Shakespeare's drama Romeo and Juliet was set.

== Soundtrack ==
The songs are composed by Sunil Kashyap. Lyrics by Viswa, Bhaskarabhatla, Paidisetty Ram and Sunil Kashyap.

- "Aajaa Aajaa" - Sravana Bhargavi
- "Ee Ammaiyil Antha" - Sunil Kashyap
- "Pranamaa" - Sunil Kashyap
- "Neelo Neelo" - Alfans
- "Naalo Cheragani" - Karthik, Ranjith
- "Romeo Rocks" - Sunil Kashyap

== Reception ==
A critic from The Times of India wrote that "Ten minutes into the story, there are hints that the film is beyond redemption and it continues to tumble down the rabbit hole".
