= Nenorakam =

2017 film

- Theatrical release poster
- Directed by: Sudershan Salendra
- Produced by: Depa Srikanth Reddy
- Starring: Sairam Shankar; Reshmi Menon
- Music by: Mahit Narayan
- Release date: 17 March 2017
- Country: India
- Language: Telugu

Nenorakam is a 2017 Indian Telugu-language action thriller directed by Sudershan Salendra. The film stars Sairam Shankar and Reshmi Menon with Sarath Kumar in a supporting role. This film performed better than Shankar's previous films.

== Cast ==
- Sairam Shankar as Gautam
- Reshmi Menon as Swecha
- Sarath Kumar as Sarath
- Saira Banu as Sarath daughter
- Adithya Menon as Police officer
- Y. Kasi Viswanath as Swecha's father
- Prudhvi as Gautam's boss
- M. S. Narayana as Nandi Raju Srikanth
- Viva Harsha as Nandi Raju Srikanth's son
- Sudigali Sudheer as Sudheer
- Getup Srinu as Goon
- Vajja Venkata Giridhar as Gautam's friend
- Gautam Raju as Police officer
- Chammak Chandra as Goon

== Soundtrack ==
The songs were composed by Mahit Narayan.

1. "Pidikedu Nadumu" – Jassie Gift
2. "Choodakunda" – Prakash Parighosh
3. "I Am So Crazy" – Swaraag Keerthan
4. "Habbu Pabbu" – Bhargavi Pillai
5. "Naa Cheli Yedhi" – Rahul Sipligunj

== Reception ==
Sify gave the film a rating of two-and-three quarters out of five stars and noted that "Nenorakam entertains here and there. Sarathkumar's character surprise will have its takers. The screenplay could have been much better towards the climax. Lack of intensity and pre-interval scenes are dampener". The Times of India gave the film a rating of two out of five stars and stated that "The film is a story of two halves, and the second half is definitely worth a watch for its cinematography and plot twists".
