= Srimannarayana =

2012 Indian film by Ravi Chavali

- Movie Poster
- Directed by: Ravikumar Chavali
- Written by: Ravikumar Chavali
- Produced by: Ramesh Puppala
- Starring: Nandamuri Balakrishna; Parvati Melton; Isha Chawla
- Cinematography: T. Surendra Reddy
- Edited by: Gautham Raju
- Music by: Chakri
- Production company: Yellow Flowers
- Distributed by: Hari Venkateswara Pictures (overseas)
- Release date: 30 August 2012
- Country: India
- Language: Telugu

Srimannarayana is a 2012 Indian Telugu-language action film directed by Ravi Chavali and cinematography by T. Surendra Reddy. Starring Nandamuri Balakrishna, Parvati Melton, Isha Chawla and music composed by Chakri.

== Plot ==
The film begins with three spiteful Harshad Kotari, a famous Hawala broker in Malaysia, Agricultural Minister Bail Reddy, his brother-in-law Pulikeshava Reddy conducts land encroachment. The squat the plots allotted to disabled soldiers that is Jai Jawan Scam, and Govt, Police, & judiciary suffer defeat. Here, a solitary that aids them is a brave & bellicose journalist, Srimannarayana, who exposes the diddle and accords land to the original. Parallelly, Swapnika, a reporter, is his adversary behind him to overpower, but in vain. After a series of donnybrooks, she crushes for him, but Srimannarayana is already in love & engaged with his cousin Bhanumati. Anyhow, she doesn't give up, and the two compete.

Besides, Srimannarayana's father, Kalki Narayana Murthy, is a social activist who is honored with Padma Shri. On that occasion, three more pernicious IG Marthand, Premier Bank Chairman Rajan Mudaliar, & Dr. Srikar Prasad arrive. Accordingly, Narayana Murthy aims to establish an association, "Jai Kisan Trust," for the welfare of farmers, which imparts gigantic results of ₹50,000,000,000 (US$520 million) of funds. Next, he deposits it at Premier Bank for usage; stunningly, Narayana Murthy dies, and the mysterious circumstances swindle 63 million. At the same time, Srimannarayana is distracted, depraved, and incriminated in the scam.

The judiciary takes Srimanarayana into custody and hands the case to CBI under Gyaneshwar's charge. However, Srimannarayana starts his investigation from the prison with the help of Swapnika when he detects a bell rung at Rajan Mudaliar. So, he silently breaks the bar attacks by coercing Jailor Shankar Reddy. As of now, Rajan Mudaliar divulges the actuality that Narayana Murthy is a cold-blooded murder done by these six knaves and posed as a heart attack. They shifted the amount to Swiss bank, which holds a 6-letter password known by each individual. Thus, the infuriated Srimannarayana initiates his murder spree by slaughtering the five blackguards without any evidence and retrieving their passwords, i.e., 4, K, I, A, N.

Gyaneshwar attempts to hit him to the maximum possible every time, which misfires. Simultaneously, Srimanarayana succeeds in proving himself guiltless and acquits. Today, Harshad abducts Srimannarayana's family, endangers them, and seeks the password. On that spot, he cleverly perceives his secret letter between I&A as S. Surprisingly, Srimannarayana announces that the lock, which miscreants created, is 4KISAN. At last, Srimannarayana battles and ceases Harshad when Gyaneshwar closes the file without a testament. Finally, the movie ends on a happy note with Srimannarayana out setting Jai Kisan Trust.

== Cast ==
- Nandamuri Balakrishna as Srimannarayana
- Isha Chawla as Bhanu
- Parvati Melton as Swapnika
- Suresh as Harshad Kotari
- Vinod Kumar as Gyaneshwar
- Vijayakumar as Kalki Narayana Murthy
- Kota Srinivasa Rao as Rajan Modaliyar
- Ahuti Prasad as Shankar Reddy
- Jaya Prakash Reddy as Bail Reddy
- Rao Ramesh as Marthand Rao IPS [IG]
- Dharmavarapu Subramanyam as Swapnika's boss
- M. S. Narayana as priest
- Nagineedu as Dr. Sreekar Prasad
- Supreeth as Pulakesava Reddy
- Krishna Bhagavan as priest
- Raja Ravindra
- Prabhu
- Kamal
- Dhanraj
- Duvvasi Mohan
- Sudha
- Satya Krishnan
- Pavala Syamala
- Lakshmi
- Usha Sri
- Madhu
- Sujatha Reddy
- Siri
- Anitha Nag

== Soundtrack ==
Srimannarayana

Film score by Chakri
- Released: 6 August 2012
- Recorded: 2012
- Genre: Soundtrack
- Length: 22:50
- Label: Aditya Music
- Producer: Chakri

Chakri chronology
Naa Ishtam (2012)	Srimannarayana (2012)	Devaraya (2012)

Music was composed by Chakri. Music was released on Aditya Music Company.

No.	Title	Lyrics	Singer(s)	Length
1.	"Thakkathai Thikkathi"	Kandikonda	Udit Narayan, Kousalya	4:23
2.	"Ottedhunane Chuttedhuna"	Praveen Lakma	Sukhwinder Singh, Geetha Madhuri	5:05
3.	"Chalaaki Choopultho"	Praveen Lakma	Daler Mehndi, Aadarshini	4:24
4.	"Kya Be Jaare"	Balaji	Vinod Yajamanya, Vijaya	4:14
5.	"Aaradugula Abbayi"	Chandrabose	Mano, Kousalya, Sravana Bhargavi	4:42
Total length:				22:50

== Reception ==
The Times of India gave a rating of 3/5 stating "Balakrishna's fans may not have any complaints against the movie. The movie is not interesting, though it is predictable." Chandini Prashar of NDTV gave a review stating "Watch the film with no expectations and you will not be disappointed." Rediff.com gave a rating of 2/5 stating "Srimannarayana's film subject is good but director Ravi Kumar Chavali has not paid enough attention to its execution."
