= Raa Raa (2018 film) =

2018 film

- Film poster
- Directed by: Shankar
- Produced by: M Vijay
- Starring: Srikanth; Naziya; Seetha Narayana
- Cinematography: Poorna
- Music by: Rap Rock Shakeel
- Release date: 23 February 2018
- Country: India
- Language: Telugu

Raa Raa (Telugu: Come, Come) is a 2018 Indian Telugu-language comedy horror film directed by Shankar and starring Srikanth, Naziya, and Seetha Narayana. This is Srikanth's first horror film.

== Cast ==
- Srikanth as Raj Kiran
- Naziya as Madi Vadani
- Seetha Narayana
- Giri Babu
- Chandra Mohan
- Shakalaka Shankar as Bumper Star
- Venu Yeldandi
- Getup Srinu
- Ali
- Chammak Chandra
- Raghu Babu
- Jeeva
- Hema
- Posani Krishna Murali
- Raghu Karumanchi
- Prudhvi Raj

== Soundtrack ==
Music composed by Rap Rock Shakeel.

- "Gallate Gallate" - Moushmi Neha
- "Nila Nila" - Vedala Hemachandra, Rap Rock Shakeel
- "Android Phone" - Rap Rock Shakeel, Sravana Bhargavi
- "Turrumani" - Rap Rock Shakeel, Swaraag Keerthan, Allrounder Ravi
- "Raa Raa" - Moushmi Neha

== Release ==
The Times of India gave the film a rating of one-and-a-half out of five stars and noted that " Suffice to say that Raa Raa is one film to which you can safely say Raanu (Telugu: won't come)". Deccan Chronicle gave the film the same rating and wrote "A big disappointment for Srikanth and you can give a complete miss to this film". Cinema Express gave the film the same rating and note that "Raa Raa runs you over and makes you feel restless without doing anything exciting. Overall, it’s an incredibly awry story that fails to engage its viewers on any level". Telangana Today wrote that "The movie has an interesting storyline but fails to fire properly". The Hans India wrote that "The point of the movie is routine, and we have already seen it in several other movies in the past".
