= Hello Premistara =

2007 Indian Telugu-language film by Raj Kumar

- Theatrical release poster
- Directed by: Raj Kumar
- Written by: Raj Kumar; Jaya Simha (dialogues)
- Produced by: Puri Jagannadh
- Starring: Sairam Shankar; Sheela Kaur
- Cinematography: Bharani
- Edited by: Marthand K. Venkatesh
- Music by: Chakri
- Production company: Vaishno Academy
- Release date: 14 September 2007
- Country: India
- Language: Telugu

Hello Premistara (transl. Hello, do you love?) is a 2007 Indian Telugu-language romantic action film directed by Raj Kumar in his sophomore directorial after Mazhai and produced by Puri Jagannadh. The film stars Sairam Shankar in a dual role alongside Sheela Kaur. The film has music composed by Chakri. The plot follows a triangle love drama between two step-brothers and a woman, inspired by the 1999 film Vaalee.

== Cast ==
- Sairam Shankar as Aravind and Arjun
- Sheela Kaur as Nandhini
- Vijayakumar as Arjun's grandfather
- Sunil as Sunil
- Brahmanandam as Amaravathi
- Ali
- Dharmavarapu Subramanyam
- Bhanu Chander
- Ranjitha
- Chandra Mohan as Nandhini's father
- M. S. Narayana as Marriage broker
- Mallikarjuna Rao
- Srinivasa Reddy
- Chitram Srinu
- Gundu Hanumantha Rao
- Kallu Chidambaram
- Sudha as Aravind's mother
- Sana as Nandhini's mother
- Bhuvaneshwari
- Sudeepa Pinky
- Satyam Rajesh

== Soundtrack ==
The soundtrack was composed by Chakri.

All lyrics are written by Kandikonda.

Track listing
No.	Title	Singer(s)	Length
1.	"Ninna Monna"	Chakri	4:57
2.	"Yennadu Leni"	G. Venugopal, Kousalya	4:38
3.	"Nee Peru Vintene"	Ravi Varma, Madhuri	4:16
4.	"Life Ante Travel"	Chakri	3:55
5.	"Dum Dum Dum"	Sai Shivani	4:43
6.	"Pokiri"	Chakri, Kousalya	4:04
Total length:			26:33

== Reception ==
G P Aditya Vardhan of Rediff.com wrote that "Though the plot is good, the director fails to make it an intense viewing". Jeevi of Idlebrain.com opined that "This kind of story line works well for Tamil films featuring competent actors, but it may not work out in Telugu". Sify said "Hello Premistara has nothing new to offer and turns out to be a forgettable experience". Full Hyderabad criticised the film.
