= Chakri (composer) =

Indian composer and singer

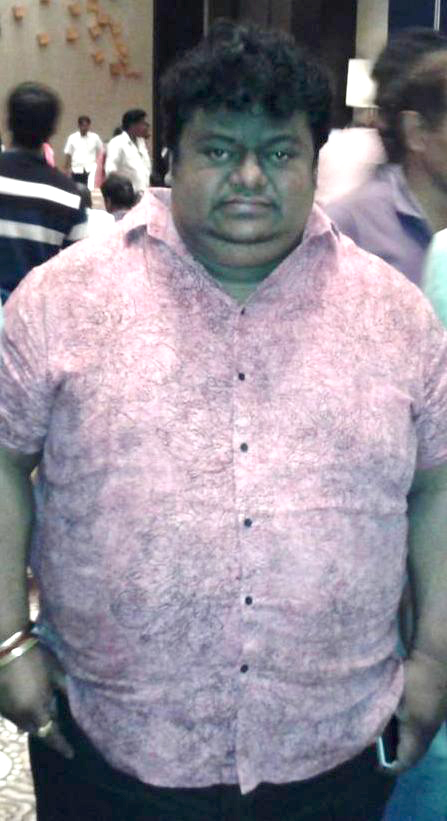
- Chakri in 2014

Background information
- Born: Gilla Chakradhar; 15 June 1974; Kambalapalli, Mahabubabad district, Andhra Pradesh (now in Telangana), India
- Died: 15 December 2014 (aged 40) Hyderabad, Telangana, India
- Genre: Film score
- Occupations: Film score composer, singer
- Years active: 2000–2014

Gilla Chakradhar (15 June 1974 – 15 December 2014), known professionally as Chakri, was an Indian composer and singer who worked in Telugu cinema. He won the Filmfare Award for Best Male Playback Singer – Telugu for Satyam (2003) and the Nandi Award for Best Music Director for Simha (2010).

== Early life ==
Chakradhar was born on 15 June 1974 in Kambalapalli, a village of the Mahabubabad district, Telangana.

== Career ==
Chakradhar was known for composing music. He worked as a music director in around 85 movies. He started his career as the music director of the 2000 film Bachi, directed by Puri Jagannadh. Chakri is a self-made musician with no background or contacts in the movie industry. He humbly began his journey as a music enthusiast with a goal to publish a music album which he did through Aditya Music. Eventually, he got the opportunity through a friend to meet with Puri Jagannadh who liked his work and promised to work together. The duo later on went on to become a sensation with hits like Itlu Sravani Subramanyam, Idiot, Amma Nanna O Tamil Ammayi. Chakri also grabbed the opportunity to work with veteran director Vamsi who is known for his great taste for music and for his long term collaboration with Ilayaraja. His orchestration, chorus and the nuances in his composition were pleasantly surprising to the Telugu audience. Chakri composed a record number of 18 movies in a single year although he got very few chances to work with established heroes despite producing great music for small budget movies.

He won the best singer award for Satyam in the Tollywood Filmfare Awards and a Nandi Award for Simha. He created many musical hits for Ravi Teja and director Puri Jagannadh, working on nine films with the former and ten films with the latter.

Chakradhar has been praised for his generosity when working with technicians, and his support to new-comers. A popular opinion is that his lack of boundaries with friendships and being generous caused him personal losses.

== Personal life ==
Chakradhar married Sravani in 2004, shortly after he divorced his first wife. He has a brother and three sisters.

=== Death ===
Chakradhar died in his sleep on 15 December 2014. His wife Sravani took him to a nearby hospital, where he was pronounced dead at around 7:45 am. Chakradhar had developed obesity-related comorbidities.

== Controversies ==
In 2013, a molestation case was filed against Chakradhar and producer Paruchuri Prasad over alleged harassment of a 36-year-old woman at a party. The police complaint lodged by the victim clarified that Chakri was made accountable as the host of the party but was not involved in the harassment himself.

== Discography ==
=== Telugu films ===
Year	Title	Notes
2000	Bachi	
2001	Itlu Sravani Subramanyam	
2002	Aaduthu Paaduthu	
2002	Dhanalakshmi, I Love You	
2002	Avunu Valliddaru Ista Paddaru	
2002	Idiot	
2003	Juniors	
2003	Ammayilu Abbayilu	
2003	Kabaddi Kabaddi	
2003	Amma Nanna O Tamila Ammayi	
2003	Dreams	
2003	Oka Raju Oka Rani	
2003	Donga Ramudu and Party	
2003	Anaganaga O Kurraadu	
2003	Sivamani	
2003	Satyam	Filmfare Award for Best Male Playback Singer – Telugu
2003	Veede	
2003	Toli Choopulone	
2004	Andhrawala	
2004	Pedababu	
2004	143	
2004	Andaru Dongale Dorikite	
2004	Suryam	
2004	Konchem Touchlo Vunte Cheputanu	
2005	Dhana 51	
2005	Pandem	
2005	Soggadu	
2005	Chakram	
2005	Bhageeratha	
2006	Party	
2006	Chukkallo Chandrudu	
2006	Devadasu	
2006	Asadhyudu	
2006	Bhagyalakshmi Bumper Draw	
2006	Aadi Lakshmi	Also actor
2007	Satyabhama	
2007	Desamuduru	
2007	Dhee	
2007	Hello Premistara	
2007	Takkari	
2008	Aatadista	
2008	Kasipatnam Chudara Babu	
2008	Krishna	
2008	Nagaram	
2008	Victory	
2008	Keka	
2008	Neninthe	
2009	Maska	
2009	Gopi Gopika Godavari	
2009	Raju Maharaju	
2010	Simha	Nandi Award for Best Music Director
2010	Golimaar	Soundtrack only
2010	Aakasa Ramanna	
2010	Baava	
2010	Saradaga Kasepu	
2011	Wanted	
2011	Money Money, More Money	
2011	Jai Bolo Telangana	
2012	Naa Ishtam	
2012	Denikaina Ready	Composed 3 songs out of 5
2012	Srimannarayana	
2012	Devaraya	
2014	Laddu Babu	
2014	Yuddham	
2014	Erra Bus	
2015	Rey	Posthumous release
2025	Mass Jathara	Used AI-generated voice

=== Kannada films ===
Year	Title	Notes
2004	Veera Kannadiga	Simultaneously shot with Andhrawala
2005	Giri	Reused two songs from Amma Nanna O Tamila Ammayi
2010	Gandedhe	
2011	Kanteerava	
2011	Smuggler	
2013	Neenandre Ishta Kano	Remake of Ammayilu Abbayilu

=== Other language films ===
Year	Title	Language	Notes
2004	Shakti	Bengali	Remake of Satyam
2011	Pillaiyar Theru Kadaisi Veedu	Tamil	Reused one song from Gopi Gopika Godavari
