= Bhageeratha (film) =

2005 film by Rasool Ellore

- DVD cover
- Directed by: Rasool Ellore
- Dialogues by: Kona Venkat; Abburi Ravi
- Story by: Kishore Kumar Pardasani (Dolly)
- Produced by: Mallidi Satyanarayana Reddy
- Starring: Ravi Teja; Shriya Saran; Prakash Raj
- Cinematography: Sunil K. Reddy
- Edited by: Gautham Raju
- Music by: Chakri
- Release date: 13 October 2005
- Running time: 161 minutes
- Country: India
- Language: Telugu

Bhageeratha is a 2005 Telugu action drama film directed by Rasool Ellore. The film stars Ravi Teja and Shriya Saran in the lead roles. Bhageeratha was an average grosser at the box office. The film was dubbed in Hindi as The Return of Sikander in 2008.

== Cast ==
- Ravi Teja as Chandrashekhar "Chandu"
- Shriya Saran as Shweta / Mahalakshmi / Sonali / Madam
- Prakash Raj as Venkata Ratnam I.A.S
- Vijayakumar as "Bridge" Bullabbai
  - Tanish as Young Bullabbai
- Brahmanandam as Hotel Manager
- Sunil as Nanda
- Nassar as Durga Prasad
- Dharmavarapu Subramanyam
- Jeeva as Yadhanna
- Raghunatha Reddy as Bullabbai's father
- Hema
- Sudha
- Srinivasa Reddy
- Venu Madhav
- Fish Venkat
- Vijay Sai

== Production ==
Few song sequences were shot in Austria and Italy. A set resembling trade fair was built at Kukatpally grounds.

== Soundtrack ==
The music was composed by Chakri and released by Aditya Music.

Bhageeratha

Soundtrack album by Chakri
- Released: 6 October 2005
- Recorded: 2005
- Genre: Soundtrack
- Length: 30:41
- Label: Aditya Music
- Producer: Chakri

Chakri chronology
Chakram (2005)	Bhageeratha (2005)	Party (2006 film) (2006)

Track list
No.	Title	Lyrics	Singer(s)	Length
1.	"Po Po Po Pove"	Bhaskarabhatla Ravi Kumar	Chakri	4:27
2.	"Narinja Pulupu"	Bhaskarabhatla Ravi Kumar	Chakri, Tina Kamal	5:06
3.	"Evaro Evaro"	Chandrabose	Hariharan, Kousalya	4:56
4.	"O Prema Nuvve"	Chandrabose	Karthik, Shweta Pandit	5:55
5.	"Prapanchame Kadanna"	Chandrabose	Shankar Mahadevan	5:48
6.	"Dil Se Karna"	Kandikonda	Ravi Varma	4:29
Total length:				30:41

== Reception ==
Idlebrain wrote "First half of the film is adequate. Second half is pretty slow. Climax is very soft. Rasool's work is good in parts. Ravi Teja's typical dialogue delivery and casual one-liners do make us like his character immensely. On a whole, Bhageeratha makes an average fare". Full Hyderabad wrote "You will watch this flick only for the dialect, the dialogues, and Ravi Teja's rasping-crude and funny delivery of these. Like the cherry you pick off a boring dessert, he sticks out appealingly, but alone. The rest of the movie, quite simply, is boring. And yes - gratuitously long".
