= Nagaram (2008 film) =

- Movie Poster
- Directed by: CC Srinivas
- Screenplay by: Swamiji-Vijay
- Based on: Abhimanyu (1991)
- Produced by: M. Anjibabu; P. Kishore Babu
- Starring: Srikanth; Jagapati Babu; Kaveri Jha
- Cinematography: Sarath
- Edited by: Gautham Raju
- Music by: Chakri
- Production company: Mac Media-Blue Sky Entertainment
- Release date: 6 March 2008
- Running time: 148 minutes
- Country: India
- Language: Telugu

Nagaram (transl. City) is a 2008 Indian Telugu-language action film produced by M. Anjibabu, P. Kishore Babu on Mac Media-Blue Sky Entertainment banner and directed by C. C. Srinivas. The film stars Srikanth, Jagapati Babu, and Kaveri Jha with music composed by Chakri. The film is loosely based on Tamil film Thalai Nagaram (2006), which itself was remake of Malayalam film Abhimanyu (1991).

== Plot ==
Right is a noted riotous in the city but is more known for his good deeds. He works as a henchman to a big-time mafia leader, Qaasim Bhai, who uses Right and his gang as professional killers. ACP Chowdhary, a sheer cop, believes in cosmic law by eliminating criminals. Navya is a Ph.D. student who researches criminals. So, she enters Right's life, and from there onwards, a dramatic change arises in his life, and they fall in love. As an eventual result, a brawl arises between Right and Qaasim. Moreover, Right kills Kaasim's son, Nazaar Bhai. Still, unfortunately, Right's henchman, Balu, dies in the contest, which evokes Right, and he surrenders to Chowdary, who gives him a chance to reform. After some time, Qaasim moved away Chowdhary, and a corrupt ACP in his place. These brutal slaughters Right's team, including his sister Lavanya. Shortly before Right's encounter, Chowdary backs for his protection. At last, two cease the baddies.

== Cast ==
- Srikanth as Right
- Jagapati Babu as ACP Chowdary
- Kaveri Jha as Nadiya
- Pradeep Rawat as Qaasim Bhai
- Brahmanandam as Mani
- Ali
- Kalabhavan Mani as New ACP
- Ajay as Balu
- Bhuvaneswari as Qaasim Bhai's trophy wife
- Jaya Prakash Reddy as Gudisala Narayana Murthy
- Raghu Babu as Shankar Dada
- G. V. Sudhakar Naidu as Nazaar Bhai
- L. B. Sriram as Lecturer
- Satyam Rajesh as ATM
- Sivaji Raja as Inspector Swamy
- Ravi Varma as Vikram
- Chinna as Chinna
- Vizag Prasad as Commissioner
- Gundu Hanumantha Rao
- Dharmavarapu Subramanyam
- Venu Madhav
- Subbaraya Sharma
- Gundu Sudarshan
- Rajitha
- Meena as Lavanya
- Prabhu as Right's henchman
- Raghu Karumanchi as Right's henchman
- Bhargavi as Balu's wife
- Prasanna Kumar as Police Inspector
- Ramjagan as Constable Gundu
- K. Ashok Kumar as Minister
- Kadambari Kiran as Auto Driver
- Bhauvaneswari as Vaani
- Vallabhaneni Janardhan as Rajugaru
- Apoorva
- Master Gaurav as Pandu
- Manisha Koirala as an item number

== Soundtrack ==
Nagaram

Film score by Chakri
- Released: 2008
- Genre: Soundtrack
- Length: 25:20
- Label: Madhura Audio
- Producer: Chakri

Chakri chronology
Victory (2008)	Nagaram (2008)	Neninthe (2008)

The music was composed by Chakri and released on MADHURA Audio Company.

No.	Title	Lyrics	Singer(s)	Length
1.	"Edhalopala Edodaham"	Bhakarbhatla	Kousalya	6:14
2.	"Varevva Vayase Garam"	Veturi	Ravi Varma, Sai Shivani	5:00
3.	"Abhi Abhi"	Bhakarbhatla	Chakri, Kousalya	4:59
4.	"Hoshiyare Hoshiyare"	Bhuvanachandra	Sunidhi Chauhan	4:35
5.	"True Life Come On"	Bhakarbhatla	Chakri, Revathi	4:32
Total length:				25:20
