= Vey Dharuvey =

Indian action film

- Theatrical release poster
- Directed by: Naveen Reddy D
- Written by: Naveen Reddy D
- Produced by: Deva Raj Pothuru
- Starring: Sairam Shankar; Yasha Shivakumar; Sunil; Deva Raj Pothuru
- Cinematography: Satish Mutyala
- Edited by: S. B. Uddhav
- Music by: Bheems Ceciroleo
- Production company: Sai Teja Entertainments
- Release date: 15 March 2024
- Running time: 127 minutes
- Country: India
- Language: Telugu

Vey Dharuvey is a 2024 Indian Telugu-language action comedy film written and directed by Naveen Reddy D, produced by Deva Raj Pothuru under Sai Teja Entertainments. The film stars Sairam Shankar, Yasha Shivakumar, Sunil, and Deva Raj Pothuru. Music was scored by Bheems Ceciroleo with cinematography by Stish Mutyala and editing by S.B. Uddhav.

== Plot ==
Under duress from his family, Shankar, a young guy from Karimnagar, relocates to Hyderabad in quest of work. He gets seduced by Shruti in Hyderabad, but when he learns a startling fact, his feelings for her take an unexpected turn.

His connection to Fly Consultants CEO Satya Harishandra Prasad and his brother Banu is established by this disclosure, which sets off a sequence of events that serve as the main plot point. The remainder of the novel follows Shankar as he works through these revelations and pursues justice.

== Cast ==
- Sairam Shankar as Shankar
- Yasha Shivakumar as Shruti
- Sunil as Banu
- Deva Raj Pothuru as Satya Harishandra Prasad
- Satyam Rajesh as Shankar's friend
- Posani Krishna Murali as Lawyer
- Prudhvi Raj as Puli Parasuram
- Y. Kasi Viswanath as Shankar's father
- Aadukalam Naren
- Chammak Chandra
- Prabhas Sreenu
- Hebah Patel (special appearance in a song)
