= Baava =

- DVD cover
- Directed by: Rambabu
- Written by: Veera Pothana (dialogues)
- Screenplay by: Rambabu
- Story by: Rambabu
- Produced by: M. L. Padma Kumar Chowdary
- Starring: Siddharth; Pranitha; Rajendra Prasad
- Cinematography: Arvind Krishna
- Edited by: K. V. Krishna Reddy
- Music by: Chakri
- Production company: Sri Keerthi Creations
- Release date: 29 October 2010
- Running time: 145 mins
- Country: India
- Language: Telugu

Baava (transl. Brother-in-law) is a 2010 Indian Telugu-language romantic comedy-drama film, produced by M. L. Padma Kumar Chowdary on Sri Keerthi Creations banner and directed by Rambabu. The film stars Siddharth, Pranitha, and Rajendra Prasad. The music is composed by Chakri. It was remade in Bangladeshi Bengali as Bhalobasar Rong (2012).

== Plot ==
Veerababu (Siddharth) is a carefree youth who lives in a village with his parents. His father Seetharamudu (Rajendra Prasad) marries a girl (Pavitra Lokesh) from a big family against her family's wishes, and they do not accept them as part of their family. All his life, Seetharam spends time regretting that he separated his wife from her family and yearns to be part of a big family. Seetharam wants his son Veerababu to marry a girl from a big family and have a status of a son-in-law. Meanwhile, Veerababu falls in love with Varalakshmi (Pranitha), a girl from the nearby village. Later it is revealed that she is Veerababu's maternal relative, and they do not agree to their marriage. Seetharam worries that his son's fate is going to be just like him and tries to dissuade him from marrying Varalakshmi. However, he later helps his son and story. The rest of the story revolves around how Veerababu wins the hearts of his girlfriend's family members and ends with their family accepting both the couples as part of their family.

== Cast ==
- Siddharth as Veerababu and young Seetharamudu
- Pranitha as Varalakshmi
- Rajendra Prasad as Seetharamudu, Veerababu's father
- Pavitra Lokesh as Veerababu's mother
- Brahmanandam
- Ali
- Sindhu Tolani
- Surekha Vani
- Tanikella Bharani
- Ahuti Prasad
- Raghu Babu
- Y. Kasi Viswanath
- Srinivasa Reddy
- Satyam Rajesh
- Duvvasi Mohan
- Praveen
- Uttej
- Narsing Yadav
- Venu Yeldandi
- Samrat Reddy
- Bharath Raju
- Prabhas Sreenu
- Jogi Naidu
- Rajitha
- Ushasri
- Jaya Murali

== Soundtrack ==
Baava

Film score by Chakri
- Released: 2010
- Genre: Soundtrack
- Length: 31:25
- Label: Aditya Music
- Producer: Chakri

Chakri chronology
Aakasa Ramanna (2010)	Baava (2010)	Saradaga Kasepu (2010)

Music composed by Chakri.

No.	Title	Lyrics	Singer(s)	Length
1.	"Pannendella Praayam"	Ananta Sriram	M. M. Keeravani	6:14
2.	"Naa Rama Chilaka"	Bhaskarabhatla	Vasu	4:56
3.	"Mila Milamani Suryo"	Kandikonda	Ranjith, Harini	5:00
4.	"Nagara Nagara"	Kandikonda	Chakri, Geetha Madhuri	4:50
5.	"Rudrudu Ramudu"	Vanamali	Mano	4:31
6.	"Baava Baava"	Ramajogayya Sastry	Siddharth	5:40
Total length:				31:25

== Release ==
Serish Nanisetti of The Hindu gave a negative review and opined that "The dénouement is a dressed up feudal drama masquerading as a cycle race. Even before the beginning you can predict the contrived end". A critic from The Times of India gave the film a rating of two out of five stars and wrote that "Although, the village backdrop is captivating, but the plot of childhood friends who later re-unite as lovers, has been done-to-death by T-Town dream merchants". Radhika Rajamani of Rediff gave the film the same rating and stated that "All in all, Baava is rather pedestrian fare. It's quite disappointing to see performances by the artistes go waste in a script like this".
