= Vaishno Academy =

Indian film production house

- Type: Private
- Industry: Entertainment
- Founded: Hyderabad, Telangana in 2002
- Founder: Puri Jagannadh
- Headquarters: Hyderabad, India
- Key people: Puri Jagannadh
- Products: Films
- Owner: Puri Jagannadh
- Subsidiaries: Puri Jagannadh Touring Talkies; Puri Sangeet

Vaishno Academy is an Indian film production company established by Telugu cinema director Puri Jagannadh. The company is based in Hyderabad. The company's logo is based on Jagannath.

== Description ==
In 2002 Vaishno Academy produced its first production, Idiot. It was remade into Tamil and Hindi. Vaishno Academy produced Amma Nanna O Tamila Ammayi and Sivamani in 2003 and 143 (and I Miss You) in 2004. This film didn't do well at box office. In 2006 Pokiri was highest grosser of Vaishno Academy's films and highest grossing Telugu film of all time.

== Film Production ==
Year	Title	Cast	Director	Notes	ref
2002	Idiot	Ravi Teja, Rakshita	Puri Jagannadh		
2003	Amma Nanna O Tamila Ammayi	Ravi Teja, Asin Thottumkal, Jayasudha, Prakash Raj	Puri Jagannadh		
2003	Sivamani	Nagarjuna, Rakshita, Asin Thottumkal	Puri Jagannadh		
2004	143	Sairam Shankar, Samiksha, Flora Saini	Puri Jagannadh		
2006	Pokiri	Mahesh Babu, Ileana D'Cruz, Prakash Raj	Puri Jagannadh		
2007	Hello Premistara	Sairam Shankar, Sheela Kaur	Raja Kumar		
2009	Bumper Offer	Sairam Shankar, Bindu Madhavi	Jaya Ravindra		
