= Hema (actress) =

Indian Telugu actress

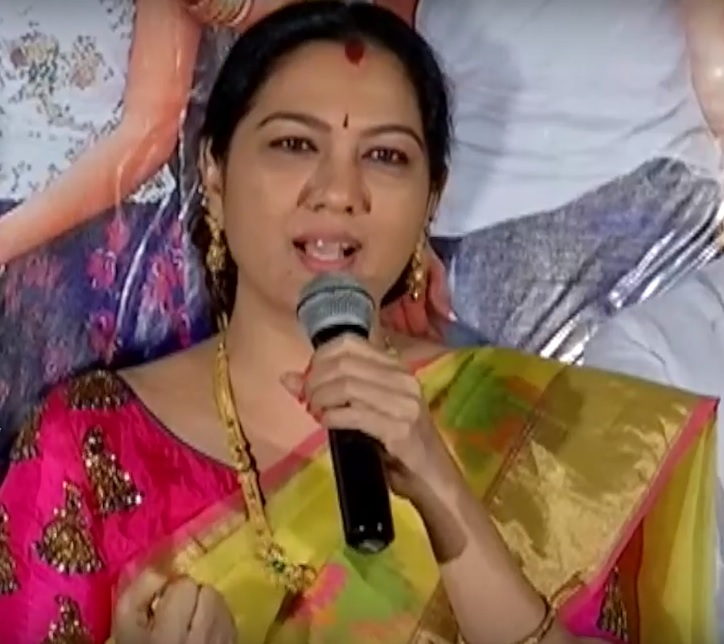
- Hema in 2018
- Born: Krishna Veni; 1972; Razole, Andhra Pradesh, India
- Occupation: Actress
- Years active: 1989–present
- Spouse: Syed Jaan Ahmed

Hema (born Krishna Veni) is an Indian actress and comedian who predominantly appears in Telugu films. She has acted in more than 250 films as of 2014. She won Nandi Award for Best Female Comedian for her performance in Konchem Ishtam Konchem Kashtam.

== Early life ==
She was born as Krishna Veni in a family from Razole, East Godavari district. She studied until seventh class, then discontinued her studies. She had an interest in films from her childhood. After acting in some, she got married. She made her comeback to film with Murari, and is now continuing her film career. She changed her name to Hema after coming to the film industry. She started working in films since 1989, it is about 35 years industry experience. She caught up in May 2024 in Bengaluru in relation to drug rackets.

== Filmography ==
=== Telugu ===
Year	Title	Role	Note
1989	Chinnari Sneham		
1989	Koduku Diddina Kapuram		
1989	Swathi Chinukulu		
1989	Muddula Mavayya		
1989	Bala Gopaludu		
1989	Palnati Rudrayya		
1989	Dharma Yudham		
1989	Paila Pachis		
1989	Vintha Dongalu		
1989	Ayyappa Swami Mahathyam		
1989	Bhale Donga		
1989	Jayammu Nischayammu Raa		
1990	Aggiramudu		
1990	Dr. Bhavani		
1990	Adadhi		
1990	Chevilo Puvvu		
1990	Jayasimha		
1990	Raja Vikramarka		
1990	Rambha Rambabu		
1990	Lorry Driver		
1991	Tholi Poddu		
1991	Teneteega		
1991	Rowdy Gaari Pellam		
1991	Kshana Kshanam		
1992	Hello Darling Lechipodama		
1992	Dabbu Bhale Jabbu		
1992	Rowdy Inspector		
1993	Money		
1993	Rendilla Pujari		
1993	Aadarsam		
1993	Mayadari Mogudu		
1993	Konguchatu Krishnudu		
1993	Pachani Samsaram		
1993	Varasudu		
1993	Mechanic Alludu		
1994	Police Bharya		
1994	Parugo Parugu		
1997	Kodalu Didhina Kapuram		
2000	Jayam Manade Raa		
2000	Goppinti Alludu		
2001	Murari		
2001	Naa Manasistha Raa		
2001	Nuvvu Naaku Nachav		
2002	Vyamoham		
2002	Premasallapam		
2002	Sontham		
2002	Pilisthe Palukutha		
2002	Nee Sneham		
2003	Ninne Istapaddanu		
2003	Simhadri		
2003	Vasantham		
2003	Okariki Okaru		
2003	Tiger Harischandra Prasad		
2004	Dost		
2004	Anjali I Love U		
2004	Pallakilo Pellikoothuru		
2004	Anandamanandamaye		
2004	Malliswari		
2004	Bhadradri Ramudu		
2004	Ammayi Bagundi		
2004	143		
2005	Friendship		
2005	Alex		
2005	Naa Alludu		
2005	Manasu Maata Vinadhu		
2005	Sravanamasam		
2005	Andhagadu		
2005	Andarivadu		
2005	Oka Oorilo		
2005	123 From Amalapuram		
2005	Soggadu		
2005	Athadu		
2005	Nuvvante Naakishtam		
2005	Bhageeratha		
2005	Danger		
2006	Evandoi Srivaru		
2006	Seetharamudu		
2006	Ramalayam Veedhilo Balu Madhumathi		
2006	Sri Ramadasu		
2006	Maayajaalam		
2006	Nee Navvu Chaalu		
2006	Roommates		
2006	Konte Kurrallu		
2006	Stalin		
2006	Boss		
2006	Tata Birla Madhyalo Laila		
2006	Gopi – Goda Meedha Pilli		
2006	Pellaina Kothalo		
2006	Annavaram		
2007	Athidhi		
2007	Yamagola Malli Modalayindi		
2007	Desamuduru		
2007	Gnapakam		
2008	Krushi		
2008	Kantri		
2008	Deepavali	Sirisha's sister	
2008	Apada Mokkulavadu		
2008	Mr. Medhavi		
2008	Idi Sangathi		
2008	Bhale Dongalu		
2008	Gamyam		
2008	Gita		
2008	Kalidasu		
2008	Sawaal		
2008	Bujjigadu		
2008	Gorintaku		
2008	Aalayam		
2008	Salute		
2008	Ashta Chemma		
2008	Rainbow		
2008	Kousalya Supraja Rama		
2008	Blade Babji		
2008	Andamaina Abaddam		
2008	Kuberulu		
2008	Chedugudu		
2009	Rs 999 Matrame		
2009	Konchem Ishtam Konchem Kashtam	Gachibowli Diwakar's wife	
2009	Aa Aa E Ee: Athanu Aame Inthalo Eeme		
2009	Vaade Kavali		
2009	Mitrudu		
2009	Bangaru Babu		
2009	Ride		
2009	Magadheera		
2009	Josh		
2009	Samardhudu		
2009	Rechipo		
2009	Jayeebhava		
2009	Saleem		
2009	Maha Muduru		
2010	Yugalageetham		
2010	Srimathi Kalyanam		
2010	Mouna Ragam		
2010	Betting Bangaraju		
2010	Buridi		
2010	Hasini		
2010	Rama Rama Krishna Krishna		
2010	Chalaki		
2010	Kothi Muka		
2010	Ramdev		
2010	Aunty Uncle Nandagopal		
2010	Adi Nuvve		
2010	Brindavanam		
2010	Visu		
2010	Prathi Roju		
2011	Golconda High School		
2011	Veera		
2011	Rajanna		
2011	Kandireega		
2011	Sri Rama Rajyam		
2011	Veedu Theda		
2011	Kshetram		
2012	Rachcha		
2012	Julayi		
2012	Dhoni		
2012	Yamudiki Mogudu		
2012	Sudigadu		
2012	Rebel		
2012	Krishnam Vande Jagadgurum		
2013	Donga Police		
2013	Sevakudu		
2013	NRI		
2013	Mirchi		
2013	1000 Abaddalu		
2013	Kamina		
2013	Attarintiki Daredi		
2013	Doosukeltha		
2013	Bhai		
2013	D for Dopidi		
2014	Jump Jilani		
2014	Rabhasa		
2014	Oohalu Gusagusalade		
2014	Joru		
2014	Erra Bus		
2014	Pilla Nuvvu Leni Jeevitam		
2014	Ee Varsham Sakshiga		
2015	S/O Satyamurthy		
2015	Vinavayya Ramayya		
2015	James Bond		
2015	Akhil		
2015	Kumari 21F		
2016	Dictator		
2016	Shourya		
2016	Eedo Rakam Aado Rakam		
2016	Srimathi Bangaram		
2016	Hyper		
2016	Abhinetri		
2016	Saptagiri Express		
2017	Lakshmi Bomb		
2017	Samanthakamani		
2017	SriValli		
2017	Inkenti Nuvve Cheppu		
2018	Raa Raa		
2018	Ammammagarillu		
2018	Saakshyam		
2018	Silly Fellows		
2019	Vinaya Vidheya Rama		
2019	Guna 369		
2020	Bombhaat		
2021	30 Rojullo Preminchadam Ela		
2021	Konda Polam		
2021	Crazy Uncles		
2022	Kothala Rayudu		
2023	Organic Mama Hybrid Alludu	Sitamma	

=== Tamil ===
Year	Film	Role	Notes
1991	Eeramana Rojave	Shanthi's friend	
2004	Gajendra	Azhagarsamy's second son-in-law's wife	
2007	Azhagiya Tamil Magan	Bus passenger	Uncredited cameo
2008	Satyam	Deiva's mother	
2012	Dhoni	History teacher	
2016	Saagasam	Madhu's stepmother	
2016	Devi	Devi's mother	

=== Other languages ===
Year	Film	Role	Language	Notes
2014	Power	Prashanti's mother	Kannada	
2016	Tutak Tutak Tutiya	Devi's mother	Hindi	

=== Television ===
Year	Programme	Role	Channel	Language	Notes
1993	Seetha Ramula Cinema Gola	Female lead	Doordarshan	Telugu	
1999	Anveshitha		ETV	Telugu	
2000	Santhi Nivasam		ETV	Telugu	
2019	Bigg Boss 3	Contestant	Star Maa	Telugu	Reality TV series; evicted on Day 9
2021	Alitho Saradaga	Guest	ETV	Telugu	Talk show
2021	Sri Devi Drama Company	Guest	ETV	Telugu	As Attha in Kitty Party show
2021	3 Roses	Rithika’s mother	Aha	Telugu	

== Politics ==
In 2014, Hema contested as MLA in 2014 Andhra Pradesh Legislative Assembly election and lost from Mandapeta constituency for Jai Samaikyandhra Party.

=== As MLA ===
S.no	Year	Assembly Constituency	Result
1	2014	Mandapeta	Lost
