= 1000 Abaddalu =

- Theatrical release poster
- Directed by: Teja
- Written by: Teja
- Produced by: Paladugu Sunitha
- Cinematography: Rasool Ellore
- Edited by: Gopi Krishna
- Music by: Ramana Gogula
- Production company: Sree Productions
- Distributed by: Chitram Movies
- Release date: 15 August 2013
- Country: India
- Language: Telugu

1000 Abaddalu or Veyyi Abaddalu (transl. Thousand Lies) is a 2013 Indian Telugu-language romantic comedy film directed by Teja and starring Sairam Shankar and Ester Noronha. The film was released on 15 August 2013, coinciding with the Indian Independence Day.

== Cast ==
- Sairam Shankar as Satya
- Ester Noronha as Satya
- Naga Babu as Tower Star
- Sameer Reddy as Surya, Satya's fiance
- Naresh as Satya's father
- Hema as Satya's mother
- Venu Yeldandi as Satya's friend
- Suman Setty as Satya's friend
- Kondavalasa as Train passenger
- Babu Mohan as Train passenger
- Vizag Prasad as Surya's father
- Prudhvi Raj as Police officer
- Gautham Raju as Minister Machi Raju
- Josh Ravi as Satya's friend
- RJ Hemanth as Satya's friend
- Chitram Srinu as Machi Raju's assistant
- Satya as Satya's friend
- Satyam Rajesh as Roadside stall owner
- Chalapathi Rao as Satya's friend's father
- R. S. Shivaji as Satya's grandfather

== Soundtrack ==
All music is composed by Ramana Gogula.

No.	Title	Lyrics	Singer(s)	Length
1.	"Abaddalu"	Kasarla Shyam	Dhanunjay Seepana
2.	"Aggipulla Vaithe"	Sai Arisetty	Dhanunjay, Chaitra H. G.
3.	"Devuda Mokkaliraa"	Pothula Ravi Kiran	Ramana Gogula, Sri Jyothi (RJ Jo)
4.	"Konte Konte"	Ramana Gogula	Dhanunjay, Chaitra H. G.
5.	"Puttinodiki"	Sai Arisetty	Narendra, Ramya
6.	"Rumba Rumbaaba"	Kasarla Shyam	Ramana Gogula, Megha, Anjana Soumya

== Reception ==
A critic from The Times of India wrote that "Teja is the director of the movie but did not see his signature anywhere throughout the movie. Not worth watching". A critic from 123telugu wrote that "1000 Abaddalu can be watched only for Naga Babu. Otherwise, there is nothing much for the viewer in this film".
