= Poola Rangadu (2012 film) =

- Film poster
- Directed by: Veerabhadram Chowdary
- Written by: Veerabhadram Chowdary
- Produced by: R. R. Venkat; Atchi Reddy
- Starring: Sunil; Isha Chawla
- Cinematography: Prasad Murella
- Edited by: Gowtham Raju
- Music by: Anup Rubens
- Production companies: R. R. Movie Makers; Max India Productions
- Distributed by: R. R. Movie Makers
- Release date: 18 February 2012
- Running time: 150 minutes
- Country: India
- Language: Telugu
- Box office: ₹50 crore

Poola Rangadu is a 2012 Indian Telugu-language action comedy film written and directed by Veerabhadram Chowdary. The film stars Sunil and Isha Chawla.This is a blockbuster movie.

== Plot ==
Ranga (Sunil) leads a happy and normal life with his family members. One day two men offer him to buy 30 acres of land in partnership with Ranga. Ranga, who is unaware of the risk, agrees to the offer. He sells his home which was being kept for his younger sister's marriage to buy the land. The land which he buys is between 300 acres on either side belonging to Konda Reddy (Dev Gill) and Lala Goud (Pradeep Rawat) both local criminals in that village who would kill whoever tried to buy the land. Ranga leaves his house and reaches the village to see his newly bought land. He doesn't yet know he got cheated by buying land which is under litigation. Soon after arriving the village, he meets his old friend Vasu (Ali), who warns Ranga to leave the place and forget about his land, revealing the danger about that place. Ranga then decides to sell his land and get the money for his sister's marriage. Lala Goud's daughter Anitha falls in love with Ranga. However, Ranga is unaware that Anitha loves him. There is flashback revealing Konda Reddy's sister eloping with Lala Goud who was a servant under Konda Reddy's father before him. Now angry, Konda Reddy wants to take revenge on Lala Goud by marrying his daughter with the intent of torturing her. The story continues and in the end Ranga battles against Konda Reddy and wins his love and the land.Poolarangadu Blockbuster Super Hit movie.100days Running Successfully in 50 theatres.

== Cast ==
- Sunil as Ranga
- Isha Chawla as Anitha
- Kota Srinivasa Rao as Ranga's father
- Dev Gill as Konda Reddy (Anitha's Uncle)
- Pradeep Rawat as Lala Goud, Anitha's father
- Ali as Vasu, Ranga's friend
- Sumithra as Anitha's maternal grandmother
- Satyam Rajesh as Bosu, Ranga's friend
- Prudhviraj as Eedara Gavvaraju "Eega" (Money Lender)
- Duvvasi Mohan as Eedara Gavvaraju's henchman
- Sudha as Ranga's mother
- Pragathi as Lakshmi ( Konda Reddy's Sister), (Anitha's Mother)
- Raghu Babu as Thalapathy (Lala Goud's Assistant)
- Arundhati Aravind as Malli
- Manava Koteshwar Rao as Event Organizer of Pochamma Thalli Fair

== Soundtrack ==
The audio of the film was released on 17 January 2012 and the launch was held at Hotel Katriya in Hyderabad on same day. The soundtrack was composed by Anoop Rubens and it consists of six songs. Lyrics for two songs were written by Kandikonda and one song by Anantha Sriram and another by Ramajogayya Sastry and remaining by Vanamali, Chandrabose.

Poola Rangadu

Soundtrack album by Anoop Rubens
- Released: 17 January 2012
- Recorded: 2012
- Genre: Film soundtrack
- Length: 25:11
- Label: Aditya Music
- Producer: Anoop Rubens

Anoop Rubens chronology
| Kodipunju (2011) | Poola Rangadu (2012) | Ishq (2012) |

Track listing
| No. | Title | Lyrics | Singer(s) | Length |
|---|---|---|---|---|
| 1. | "Poola Rangadu" | Anantha Sriram | Benny Dayal, Nakash, Bhargavi, Lipsika | 4:04 |
| 2. | "Nuvvu Naku Kavali" | Ramajogayya Sastry | Anoop Rubens, Ranjith, Kousalya | 4:05 |
| 3. | "Okkade Okkade" | Kandikonda | Raja Hassan, Noel, Lipsika | 4:29 |
| 4. | "Nuvve Nuvvele" | Vanamali | Karthik, Gayatri | 4:34 |
| 5. | "Chocklate" | Chandrabose | Udit Narayan, Meenal Jain | 3:50 |
| 6. | "Okkade Okkade (Rubens Club Mix)" | Kandikonda | Raja Hassan, Lipsika | 4:09 |
| Total length: | | | | 25:11 |

== Reception ==
A critic from The Times of India wrote that "No holds barred entertainment! That’s what “Poolarangadu” is all about. Sunil shows once again that given the right kind of script, he can carry a film on his muscular shoulders". A critic from 123telugu wrote that "Poola Rangadu is a good, clean entertainer".

== Box office ==
After the film ran for 50 days on 7 April 2012 in notable centres it had collected box office takings of ₹ 500 million. Movie makers have released a press note in this regard. The film has completed 100 days on 27 May 2012.

== Accolades ==
| Ceremony | Category | Nominee | Result |
|---|---|---|---|
| 2nd South Indian International Movie Awards | Best Film | R. R. Venkat, Atchi Reddy | Nominated |
