= Danger (2005 film) =

- DVD cover
- Directed by: Krishna Vamsi
- Written by: Krishna Vamsi
- Dialogue by: Uttej
- Produced by: Sunkara Madhu Murali
- Starring: Allari Naresh; Sairam Shankar; Abhishek; Swathi; Shireen
- Cinematography: Om Prakash
- Edited by: Lokesh; Naveen (Digital)
- Music by: Joshua Sridhar
- Production company: Karthikeya Creations
- Release date: 29 October 2005
- Running time: 126 minutes
- Country: India
- Language: Telugu

Danger is a 2005 Indian Telugu-language thriller film written and directed by Krishna Vamsi. The film features an ensemble cast starring Allari Naresh, Sairam Shankar, Abhishek, Colours Swathi, and Shireen. The film soundtrack and background score were composed by Kaadhal-famed Joshua Sridhar, who made his straight Telugu debut through the film. Dialogues for the film were written by popular actor Uttej. Danger marked the film debut of popular television anchor Colours Swathi.

The film was released on 29 October 2005 and was successful at the box office. The film was later dubbed and released in Tamil as Abhayam.

== Plot ==
Karthik, Satya, Ali, Lakshmi, and Radhika Reddy are childhood friends. They set out to a farmhouse for a party to celebrate the prospective marriage of Lakshmi. On the way, they collide with a police vehicle, and they speed away to the party happening in the outskirts of the city. The policemen in the vehicle are badly hurt, and one of them takes note of the car number which hit them. The police raids the party in search of the owners of the car. Panic raises among the crowd, and the group consisting of the five friends escapes from the party and in process of avoiding the chasing cops, they get lost in the Vikarabad forest. There, they tumble upon a ghastly incident where a man is taking the life of a toddler as part of a sacrificial ritual and black magic. Ali shoots the entire episode with his video camera. It is revealed that the man who killed the toddler is Gattayya, a politician who believes that using black magic can make him successful. The group gets discovered by Gattayya while filming the ritual. With Gattayya's goons chasing them, the group escapes from there. A corrupt cop named Raju Nayak is hired by Gattayya to search for the group. The group cannot return to their homes because the police are still looking for them at their respective houses. The group struggles with the situation and finally emerges victorious when they upload the video that was recorded to the internet. In the end, Raju Nayak is killed by the police commissioner and Gattayya is arrested.

== Cast ==
- Allari Naresh as Satya
- Sairam Shankar as Karthik
- Abhishek as Ali
- Shireen as Radhika Reddy
- Swathi as Lakshmi
- Siva Prasad as Gattayya
- Satya Prakash as Raju Nayak, Police Circle Inspector
- Brahmanandam as Brahmam, a driving school instructor
- Shafi as Gattayya's brother
- Harsha Vardhan as Inspector Rajesh
- Hema as Lakshmi's mother
- Krishna Bhagavaan as Doctor Kelvin
- Vinay Varma as Black Magic Tantrik
- Ahuti Prasad as Police Commissioner Alexander IPS
- Ravi Prakash as Ravi, Lakshmi's fiancé
- Kota Shankar Rao as Karthik's father
- Bharath Raju as Nelson, Kartik's friend
- Kavitha as Karthik's mother
- Chittajalu Lakshmipati as Karthik's uncle
- Venkata Sriram

== Production ==
The entire film was shot using a single Arri 3 camera in 35 Days. Krishna Vamsi revealed that no cranes or steady cameras were used in the filming and only torch lights and natural lighting were used. Major filming was done in Hyderabad and some part of the film was shot in Vikarabad and Narsapur forests. This film also marks the debut of successful TV anchor Colours Swathi into films.

== Reception ==
The film released on 29 October 2005 and received mixed to positive reviews from critics.

Priyanka Pulla of fullhyd.com rated the film 7.5 out of 10 stars and wrote, "From horror to fear to comedy, Danger takes a decent shot at all. That's better entertainment-per-unit-time value than you'll get in a long time. Go for this one for a good rattle and shake this week (and probably many after). It will keep you jiving long after you leave the theater."

Jeevi of Idlebrain.com gave the film 2.75 out of 5 stars and said, "Krishna Vamsi must be appreciated for attempting a different film, but it is of no use if the film does not make a mark for itself."

IndiaGlitz said, "Krishna Vamsi must be applauded for trying something new and staying away from the predictable path. In the event, he gets over 70 percent for attempt, but just pass marks for accomplishment."

== Accolades ==
Nandi Awards

- Nandi Award for Best Villain – Siva Prasad
