= Bumper Offer =

- Directed by: Jaya Ravindra
- Written by: Puri Jagannadh (dialogues)
- Screenplay by: Jaya Ravindra
- Story by: Puri Jagannadh
- Produced by: Puri Jagannadh
- Starring: Sairam Shankar; Bindu Madhavi; Sayaji Shinde
- Cinematography: Sai Sriram
- Edited by: M. R. Varma
- Music by: Raghu Kunche
- Production company: Vaishno Academy
- Release date: 23 October 2009
- Country: India
- Language: Telugu

Bumper Offer is a 2009 Indian Telugu-language action comedy romance film directed by Jaya Ravindra. The film stars Sairam Shankar and Bindu Madhavi. The music of the film was composed by Raghu Kunche. The film released on 23 October 2009. Puri Jagannadh produced this film apart from writing the story and the dialogues. The movie was a commercial success. The movie was remade in Bengali in 2013 as Loveria and in Bengali Bangladesh in 2020 as Shoshurbari Zindabad 2.

== Plot ==
Sai completes his education and wastes his time. He refuses to marry as his mother Ramanamma wanted to put some responsibility on him. Sai's father Rao is a clerk with a real estate firm run by Surya Prakash.

Once, Surya Prakash"s daughter Aiswarya breaks the leg of Sai mistaking him to be someone who tried to tease her. This makes him lose his heart to Aiswarya. After a few turn of events, Aiswarya too falls flat for Sai. But this irks Surya Prakash who tried to thrash both Rao and Sai black and blue. Aiswarya reaches the spot and warns that she would shoot herself if any harm is done to them. Surya Prakash budges to the situation and gives an offer to Sai to earn at least five per cent value of his assets and marry Aiswarya. But the latter refuses the offer saying that he is giving another bumper offer to Surya Prakash that he would make him lose his entire property and assets and pull him down to the earth and make him equal to their family to catch the hand of Aiswarya.

What plans did Sai make to make Surya Prakash bankrupt? What happens to the love between Sai and Aiswarya? Who is Mallikarjun and what kind of help or harm did he do to Sai? Did Sai emerge victorious in teaching a lesson to Surya Prakash? Answers to all these questions form part of the climax.

== Cast ==
- Sairam Shankar as Sai
- Bindu Madhavi as Aishwarya
- Sayaji Shinde as Surya Prakash, Aishwarya's father
- Rani as Aishwarya's mother
- Brahmanandam as Viswanath
- Dharmavarapu Subrahmanyam
- MS Narayana
- Ali as Bhairava
- Kovai Sarala as Ramanamma, Sai's mother
- Chandra Mohan as Rao, Sai's father
- Jaya Prakash Reddy
- Venu Madhav as Mitravinda
- Supreeth as Mallikharjun
- Khayyum as Khayyum, Sai's friend
- Shankar Melkote as Doctor
- Gundu Sudarshan
- Master Bharath
- Sravan
- Vamsi
- Kiranmayi
- Chaitanya
- Junior Relangi

== Production ==
This film marks the debut of Jaya Ravindra, an assistant director to Puri Jagannadh.

== Soundtrack ==
Bumper Offer

Soundtrack album to Bumper Offer by Raghu Kunche
- Released: 11 September 2009
- Recorded: 2009
- Genre: Feature film soundtrack
- Language: Telugu
- Label: Puri Sangeet
- Producer: Raghu Kunche

Raghu Kunche chronology
Bumper Offer (2009)	Aha Naa Pellanta (2011)

Raghu Kunche composed the music. making his debut as a music director. He won the Nandi Special Jury Award for Music Director in the year 2009. The music of the film was launched at a function organized in Prasad Labs on the night of 11 September 2009. "Bujjikonda" is based on "Linda Linda" by the Dutch band Tee-Set.

All lyrics are written by Bhaskarabhatla.

No.	Title	Artist(s)	Length
1.	"Ravanamma"	Raghu Kunche
2.	"Maikam"	Nilayini
3.	"Bujjikonda"	Raghu Kunche, Savitha Reddy
4.	"Olammo"	Raghu Kunche
5.	"Naarinja Pandu"	Vinaya Gopalakrishnan, Rahul Nambiar

== Awards ==
- Raghu Kunche won Nandi Special Jury Award for Best Singer – "Enduke Ramanamma"
