= Chakram (2005 film) =

- Directed by: Krishna Vamsi
- Screenplay by: Satyanand; Krishna Vamsi
- Story by: Krishna Vamsi
- Produced by: C. Venkatraju; G. Sivaraju
- Starring: Prabhas; Asin; Charmy Kaur
- Cinematography: C. Ramprasad; Om Prakash; Arvind Krishna
- Edited by: K. V. Krishna Reddy
- Music by: Chakri
- Production company: Geeta Chitra International
- Release date: 25 March 2005
- Running time: 150 minutes
- Language: Telugu

Chakram (transl. Wheel) is a 2005 Indian Telugu-language drama film directed and co-written by Krishna Vamsi. It stars Prabhas, Asin and Charmy Kaur. The music was composed by Chakri. The film was released on 25 March 2005 to mixed reviews and became a flop at the box office. However, it won two Nandi Awards. It was dubbed in Hindi and Bhojpuri languages under the same name and in Malayalam as Dharma Chakram.

== Plot ==
Chakram (Prabhas) is a foreign returnee who has a dream of building a hospital at Pulivendula. He is in love with his colleague and cousin Lakshmi (Asin), who studied medicine with him abroad. For an unknown reason, he runs away from his marriage hall. He then moves to Hyderabad and stays in a place called "Sahara Colony". There, he helps all the people solving their problems and to smile again. Seeing all this, another girl who is also named Lakshmi (Charmy) slowly falls in love with Chakram. Chakram left because he found out that he has blood cancer and will die soon.

== Cast ==
- Prabhas as Chakram
- Asin as Lakshmi
- Charmy Kaur as Lakshmi
- Prakash Raj as Peddi Reddy, Chakram's father
- Urvashi as Chakram's mother
- Tanikella Bharani as Lakshmi's (Asin) father
- Rajya Lakshmi as Lakshmi's (Charmy) mother
- Radha Kumari as Lakshmi's (Charmy) grandmother
- Ahuti Prasad as Ram Prasad
- Venu Madhav as Auto Driver
- M. S. Narayana as Watchman
- Raghu Babu as Conman
- Santhosh Keezhattoor as Giri
- Brahmanandam as railway T.C.
- Mallikarjuna Rao
- Srinivasa Reddy
- Bhuvaneswari
- Siva Reddy
- A.V.S.
- Delhi Rajeswari
- Narayana Rao
- Kalpana
- Vajja Venkata Giridhar as Henchman
- B. Padmanabham as himself
- Bill Bitra

== Soundtrack ==
The music was composed by Chakri.

Chakram

Soundtrack album by Chakri
- Released: 28 February 2005
- Recorded: 2005
- Genre: Soundtrack
- Length: 29:01
- Label: Aditya Music
- Producer: Chakri

Chakri chronology
Soggadu (2005)	Chakram (2005)	Bhageeratha (2005)

Track list
No.	Title	Lyrics	Singer(s)	Length
1.	"Na Peru Chakram"	Chandrabose	Sri	5:07
2.	"Sony Cell Phone"	Kandikonda	Chakri, Kousalya	4:54
3.	"Oke Oka Mata"	Sirivennela Seetharama Sastry	Chakri	5:30
4.	"Koncham Karanga"	Sirivennela Seetharama Sastry	Kousalya	4:26
5.	"Rangeli Holi"	Sirivennela Seetharama Sastry	Shankar Mahadevan	4:46
6.	"Jagamanta Kutumbam"	Sirivennela Seetharama Sastry	Sri	4:18
Total length:				29:01

== Reception ==
A critic from Rediff.com opined that "despite spending lavishly, a wafer-thin plot ensures a loser". Jeevi of Idlebrain.com said that "On the whole, Chakram disappoints". A critic from Full Hyderabad wrote that "Not worth a watch unless there is nothing better around".

== Awards ==
Nandi Awards

- Best Director - Krishna Vamsi
- Best Lyricist - Sirivennela Sitarama Sastry for "Jagamantha Kutumbam"
