= Takkari =

- DVD cover
- Directed by: Amma Rajashekhar
- Written by: Boopathy Pandian
- Based on: Thiruvilaiyaadal Aarambam (Tamil)
- Produced by: Parachuri Shivarama Prasad
- Starring: Nithiin; Sadha; Sayaji Shinde
- Cinematography: Santosh Srinivas
- Edited by: Gautham Raju
- Music by: Chakri
- Production company: United Movies
- Release date: 23 November 2007
- Country: India
- Language: Telugu

Takkari (transl. Cunning) is a 2007 Indian Telugu-language film directed by Amma Rajashekhar. The film stars Nithiin and Sadha. It is a remake of Tamil language film, Thiruvilaiyaadal Aarambam. The film was later dubbed in Malayalam as Gambler and in Hindi as Meri Ladai in 2008.

== Plot ==
Tirupathi (Nithiin) is a brilliant man who wants to become a realtor, much to the chagrin of his father (Chandra Mohan), who doesn't support his goal. Eventually Tirupati wins the heart of a rich girl, Priya (Sadha), sister of a business tycoon and villainous Guru (Sayaji Shinde). He realizes his ambition in real estate. The Guru wants him to drop his sister; Tirupati in return demands money. The villain gives him a cheque from a dubious bank. However, Tirupathi gets his money as he blackmails the heroine's brother, threatening to expose some photos. The villain also plans an IT raid on Tirupathi's companies. However, that plan backfires. Then Guru tries to get his sister married to another, but the hero marries her. The story ends with Tirupathi returning all the money taken from the Guru, who finally accepts the marriage.

== Cast ==
- Nithiin as Tirupathi
- Sadha as Priya
- Sayaji Shinde as Guru
- Giri Babu as Rama Chandra Murthy, Priya's father
- Chandra Mohan as Chandram, Tirupathi's father
- Suhasini Maniratnam as Snehalatha, Priya's mother
- Sudha as Janaki, Tirupathi's mother
- Raghu Babu as Muthukrishna
- Brahmanandam as Nandagopal, Tirupathi's friend
- Venu Madhav as Venu
- Ali as Roshan from HITEC City
- Uttej as Bus conductor
- Narsing Yadav as Train ticket collector
- Satyam Rajesh as Tirupathi's friend
- Venu Yeldandi as Tirupathi's friend
- Gundu Hanumantha Rao as Astrologer
- Sana as Lakshmi, Guru's wife
- Madhunandan as Tirupathi's friend
- Ambati Srinivas

== Soundtrack ==
Takkari

Soundtrack album by Chakri
- Released: 11 April 2007
- Genre: Feature film soundtrack
- Label: Vel Records

Chakri chronology
Dhee (2006)	Takkari (2007)	Kasipatnam Chudara Babu (2008)

The soundtrack of the film was composed by Chakri.

Track-list
No.	Title	Singer(s)	Length
1.	"Ammi Ammi"	Chakri, Sai Shivani	5:36
2.	"Kobbari Kobbari"	Chakri, Kousalya	5:13
3.	"Yelele Yelele"	Zubeen Garg, Revathi	4:37
4.	"Yelele Yelele 2"	Chakri, Revathi	4:39
5.	"Nacho Nacho"	Ravi Varma	4:17
6.	"Aa Aa Aa"	Naveen Madhav, Kousalya	4:28

== Reception ==
Y. Sunita Chowdary of The Hindu noted that "Takkari looks to be exactly what it promises to be-Nitin’s return to form".
