= Itlu Sravani Subramanyam =

2001 Telugu film by Puri Jagannadh

- DVD cover
- Directed by: Puri Jagannadh
- Written by: Puri Jagannadh
- Produced by: C. Seshu Reddy; K. Venugopal Reddy
- Starring: Ravi Teja; Tanu Roy; Samreen Zaidi
- Cinematography: K. Datthu
- Edited by: Marthand K. Venkatesh
- Music by: Chakri
- Production company: S. V. Celluloid
- Release date: 14 September 2001
- Country: India
- Language: Telugu

Itlu Sravani Subramanyam (transl. Regards, Sravani and Subramanyam) is a 2001 Indian Telugu-language romantic drama film written and directed by Puri Jagannadh. This film stars Ravi Teja, Tanu Roy and Sheen (the latter two make their debut). The plot follows two strangers who desire to unite following a suicide attempt. The music was composed by Chakri with cinematography by K. Dutt and editing by Marthand K. Venkatesh.

The film released on 14 September 2001 and was declared a blockbuster. Jagannadh won Nandi Award for Best Story Writer for the film. It is remade in Tamil as Thavam (2007) and unofficially in Hindi as Anjaana Anjaani (2010).

== Plot ==
Sravani and Subramanyam are strangers who meet at the suicide point on Vizag's seashore. Before attempting the suicide, they tell each other the reason of ending their lives and duly write suicide notes. Sravani's relatives-cum-guardians nag her for the ancestral money while Subramanyam is cheated by a friend who took a lump sum of money in lieu of getting a job in Dubai. Sravani and Subramanyam fulfill their last wishes with each other's help. In their suicide attempt, they consume a high dosage of sleeping pills in Subramanyam's flat. However, the landlord rescues them. Subramanyam ends up with a plum job later while Sravani's relatives take her back home. Subramanyam's marriage gets fixed with a girl of his mother's choice, and Sravani's marriage is fixed with her maternal uncle. Sravani and Subramanyam flee from their respective marriage halls independently and unite against all odds.

== Cast ==
- Ravi Teja as Subramanyam
- Tanu Roy as Sravani
- Samreen Zaidi as Boss's daughter
- Tanikella Bharani as Subramanyam's uncle
- L. B. Sriram as Sundar
- M. S. Narayana
- Kalpana Rai as Priyanka Chopra
- Uttej as Peon in Subramanyam's office
- Ananth Babu as Photographer
- Annapoorna as Subramanyam's mother
- Gundu Sudarshan
- Jeeva
- Dharmavarapu Subramanyam
- Chinna
- Raghu Kunche
- G. V. Sudhakar Naidu
- Prasanna

== Soundtrack ==
The music was composed by Chakri and released by Aditya Music.

Itlu Sravani Subramanyam

Soundtrack album by Chakri
- Released: 2001
- Recorded: 2001
- Genre: Soundtrack
- Length: 30:21
- Label: Aditya Music
- Producer: Chakri

Chakri chronology
| Bachi (2000) | Itlu Sravani Subramanyam (2001) | Aaduthu Paaduthu (2002) |

Track list
| No. | Title | Lyrics | Singer(s) | Length |
|---|---|---|---|---|
| 1. | "Happy Day" | Chandrabose | Chakri | 4:32 |
| 2. | "Malli Kuyave" | Kandikonda | Hariharan, Kousalya | 6:12 |
| 3. | "Neekosam" | Kandikonda | Sudha | 4:43 |
| 4. | "Ramasakkani" | Bhaskarabhatla Ravi Kumar | Sukhwinder Singh, Saveri | 5:11 |
| 5. | "Emoemavuno" | Sahithi | Chakri | 4:57 |
| 6. | "Pillo Pisinari Pillo" | Sahithi | Kumar Sanu, Kousalya | 4:46 |
| Total length: | | | | 30:21 |

== Reception ==
Griddaluru Goplarao of Zamin Ryot praised Jagannadh's screenplay and direction. He added that Ravi Teja's performance was convincing and supporting cast played their part as well. Idlebrain.com rated the film 3/5 and wrote, "The film starts on an interesting and offbeat note. Due to slow narrative, the film is dragged in some moments. Overall, it is a good film with offbeat storyline."

== Awards ==
- Nandi Award for Best Story Writer – Puri Jagannadh
