= SVBC =

Indian television channel

Sri Venkateswara Bhakti Channel
- Country: India
- Headquarters: Tirupati, Andhra Pradesh, India

Programming
- Languages: Telugu, Kannada, Tamil, Hindi
- Picture format: 16:9 (576i, SDTV) (1080p, HDTV)

Ownership
- Owner: Tirumala Tirupati Devasthanams

History
- Launched: 7 July 2008; 18 years ago

Links
- Website: SVBCtv; SVBCtv2

Sri Venkateswara Bhakthi Channel (SVBC TV) is the pioneer devotional (bhakthi) channel of TTD. It is the first 24-hour satellite Telugu devotional channel dedicated to broadcasting Hindu devotional programs and live telecasts of poojas performed in the Tirumala Tirupati Devasthanams from Tirupati in Andhra Pradesh, India.

SVBC channel is available on Tata SKY, Videocnon DTH, SUN Direct and many other Indian satellite TV providers.
