= Prudhvi Raj =

Indian Telugu actor

- Born: Balireddy Pruthviraj; 6 August 1964 (age 62); Tadepalligudem, Andhra Pradesh, India
- Education: M.A
- Alma mater: Andhra University, Visakhapatnam
- Occupations: Actor; politician
- Years active: 1986–present
- Organization: Movie Artists Association
- Political party: Jana Sena Party (2024–present)
- Other political affiliations: YSR Congress Party (2019−2022)
- Spouse: Sri Laxmi

Balireddy Prudhviraj (born 6 August 1964) is an Indian actor and politician known for his roles in Telugu films. He has appeared in over 100 films, primarily in comedic roles, and is widely recognised for his iconic dialogue "30 years industry" from the 2002 film Khadgam.

In addition to his career in cinema, Prudhviraj has been actively involved in politics. In February 2019, he was appointed as the state secretary of the YSR Congress Party in Andhra Pradesh. He also served as the chairman of the SVBC TV channel, which is operated by Tirumala Tirupati Devasthanams, until January 2020. Prudhviraj is currently a member of the Janasena Party.

== Career ==
Prudhviraj was born in Tadepalligudem, West Godavari District, Andhra Pradesh. He was introduced by noted actor M. Prabhakar Reddy and E. V. V. Satyanarayana in their first film Aa Okkati Adakku (1992). During this film he spent forty days with Rao Gopala Rao, where he learnt about the film industry. He played many roles in about 100 films. He was well recognized for his dialogue "30 Years Industry ikkada" in Krishna Vamsi's film Khadgam (2002) and this film changed his fate. In the year 2022, he joined Jana Sena Party.

== Controversy ==
Prudhvi Raj had joined the YSRCP in 2018, and after it came into power he has been nominated as chairman of Sri Venkateswara Bhakti Channel in 2019. In January 2020, his audiotape recording with a female employee of SVBC TV channel went viral on YouTube and SVBC employees protested urging him to resign from his post as the chairman of the channel. Following that incident Prudhviraj resigned as chairman of Sri Venkateswara Bhakti Channel.

Prithviraj joined the Janasena party at the Janasena office in Mangalagiri, Andhra Pradesh, on 24 January 2024 in the presence of party president Pawan Kalyan.

== Filmography ==
=== Telugu films ===
Year	Title (Note: Films are listed in the order of their release date)	Role	Notes and Ref.
1986	Ladies Tailor		
1989	Gandipeta Rahasyam	Character resembling NTR	
1990	Intinta Deepavali		
1990	Prema Khaidi		
1990	Prajala Manishi	Hari	
1990	Nagastram		
1991	Vidhata	Inspector Jagannath	
1992	Aa Okkati Adakku		
1993	Varasudu		
1996	Ninne Pelladata		
1997	Sindhooram	Naxalite	
1997	Priyamaina Srivaru		
1998	Ganesh	Dr. Anand	
1998	Chandralekha	Ramaraju	
1999	Samudram	Police Officer	
2000	Bachi		
2000	Devullu		
2001	Inspector Vikram		
2002	Kalusukovalani	Interviewer	
2002	Idiot	Police Officer	
2002	Khadgam	30 Years Industry	
2003	Ammayi		
2003	Amma Nanna O Tamila Ammayi	Police officer	
2003	Simhachalam	Sriram Yadav	
2004	Arya	Reddy	
2004	Sri Anjaneyam		
2005	Okkade	Police Officer	
2005	Gowtam SSC	Police Officer	
2006	Ranam	Police Inspector	
2006	Pokiri	Viswanath	
2006	Evandoi Srivaru	Himself	
2007	Evadaithe Nakenti	Diwakar	
2007	Dhee	Rowdy	
2007	Yamagola Malli Modalayindi	Man in Rama getup	Uncredited
2008	Gautama Buddha	Minister	
2008	John Apparao 40 Plus		
2008	Ready		
2008	King		
2008	Souryam	Police Officer	
2008	Yuvatha	Krishna Manohar	
2009	Sasirekha Parinayam	Lorry Driver	
2009	Fitting Master	Police Officer	
2009	Rechipo	Police Officer	
2009	Kick	Minister	
2009	Naa Style Veru		
2009	Current	Police officer	
2009	Snehituda...	Police officer	
2009	Ek Niranjan	Ex-minister	
2009	A Aa E Ee	Police Officer	
2010	Adhurs		
2010	Namo Venkatesa	Prasad's gang member	
2010	Rama Rama Krishna Krishna		
2010	Prasthanam		
2010	Vedam	Bullebbayi	
2011	Jai Bolo Telangana		
2011	Kudirithe Kappu Coffee	Company MD	
2011	Aha Naa Pellanta	Pilot	
2011	Brahmi Gadi Katha	Producer's henchman	
2011	Dookudu	Dummy Doctor	
2011	Bezawada		
2012	Poola Rangadu	Eedara Gavvaraju	
2012	Six	Jagga Reddy	
2012	Nuvva Nena		
2012	Gabbar Singh		
2012	Uu Kodathara? Ulikki Padathara?	Siddha	
2012	Vennela 1½		
2012	Damarukam	Ad film director	
2012	Yamudiki Mogudu		
2013	Donga Police		
2013	Seethamma Vakitlo Sirimalle Chettu		
2013	Baadshah	Kathi Netthuru actor	
2013	Sukumarudu		
2013	Action 3D		
2013	1000 Abaddalu	Police Officer	
2013	Dalam		Bilingual film
2013	Athadu Aame o Scooter	Govind Raju's father	
2013	Attarintiki Daredi	Paata Basthi Parameswar	
2013	Venkatadri Express	Subrahmanyam	
2013	Kevvu Keka	Punchutality Prabhanjanam	
2013	Aadu Magaadra Bujji		
2013	Kharjooram		
2014	Legend	Party candidate	
2014	Bhimavaram Bullodu	A blind man	
2014	Adavi Kaachina Vennela		
2014	Oohalu Gusagusalade	Marriage Broker	
2014	Power	Cabinet Minister	
2014	Rabhasa	College Principal	
2014	Aagadu	Veera Kesavulu	
2014	Geethanjali	House Broker	
2014	Loukyam	'Boiling Star' Bablu	
2015	Pataas	Politician	
2015	Pandaga Chesko		
2015	Jadoogadu		
2015	James Bond		
2015	Dongaata	ACP Kanakambaram	
2015	Mirchi Lanti Kurradu		
2015	Kick 2		
2015	Sher	Pappi's uncle	
2015	Sankarabharanam	Percentage Paramesh S.I.	
2015	Bengal Tiger	'Future Star' Siddappa	
2015	Bruce Lee – The Fighter	Ratnam	
2015	Soukhyam	Shivudu	
2015	Jatha Kalise		
2016	Abbayitho Ammayi		
2016	Dictator	Ramesh Patro	
2016	Terror	MLA Ravi	
2016	Speedunnodu	Sobhan's brother-in-law	
2016	Sarrainodu	Obul Reddy's henchman	
2016	Supreme	Tom	
2016	Rarandoi Veduka Chudham	Dorababu	
2016	Parvathipuram	KTV News Channel head	
2016	Selfie Raja	Ankusam	
2016	Babu Bangaram	Batayyi Babji	
2016	Aatadukundam Raa		
2016	Chuttalabbai	Mr. Ego / E. Govardhan Reddy	
2016	Jakkanna	Katakatala Katappa	
2016	Abhinetri	Spirit Priest	Uncredited
2016	Eedu Gold Ehe	Narada	
2016	Premam	Suma's father	
2016	Krishna Gaadi Veera Prema Gaadha	Police Officer	
2016	Ekkadiki Pothavu Chinnavada	Doctor	
2016	Meelo Evaru Koteeswarudu	'Variation Star' Veera Babu	
2017	Khaidi No. 150	Minister Shekar	
2017	Winner	Singham Sujatha	
2017	Gunturodu	Babu Rao	
2017	Kittu Unnadu Jagratha	Rechukka	
2017	Nenorakam		
2017	Katamarayudu	NASA Sarvam	
2017	Mister	Director	
2017	Baahubali 2: The Conclusion	Kunthala Kingdom's Minister	
2017	Ninnu Kori	Lova Babu	
2017	Vaisakham	Babu Rao	
2017	LIE	Indrudu	
2017	Paisa Vasool	Advocate Pruthviraj	
2017	Raja the Great	Bank Manager Babji	
2017	PSV Garuda Vega	Doctor	
2017	Prematho Mee Karthik		
2017	Balakrishnudu	Maddy R	
2018	Achari America Yatra		
2018	Gayatri	Minister Shankar Rao	
2018	Ego	CI Aavugadda Apparao	
2018	Raa Raa		
2018	MLA	Kalyan's PA	
2018	Rangasthalam		
2018	Bharat Ane Nenu	MLA	
2018	Pantham	House Owner Vaadakam	
2018	Tej I Love You	Tej's Uncle	
2018	Raju Gadu	Dr. Saima	
2018	Vijetha	Police SI	
2018	Rangu	Stage Artist	
2018	Desamudurs	Bhoom Bhaskar	
2018	Shailaja Reddy Alludu	Manikyam	
2018	Devadas	Jahnavi's manager	
2018	My Dear Marthandam	Lawyer	
2018	Bluff Master	Dhana Shetty	
2019	Vinaya Vidheya Rama	Rajasekhar	
2019	F2: Fun and Frustration	Ramaswamy Naidu	
2019	Yatra	Sujaya Krishna Ranga Rao	
2019	Maharshi	Journalist	
2019	Burrakatha	Bongaram Hema	
2019	Edaina Jaragocchu		
2019	Software Sudheer	Doctor	
2019	Iddari Lokam Okate	Mukesh	
2019	Sye Raa Narasimha Reddy	Madhavayyar	
2021	Bangaru Bullodu	Bank Manager	
2021	Jai Sena		
2021	Zombie Reddy	Veera Reddy's henchmen	
2021	Idhe Maa Katha		
2022	Super Machi		
2022	Shasana Sabha		
2022	Son of India		
2022	F3	Palace Incharge	
2022	Ante Sundaraniki	Sundar's uncle	
2022	Konda	Nalla Balli Sudhakar Rao	
2022	Saakini Daakini	Raghu	
2022	Geetha		
2022	Nachindi Girl Friendu	Police inspector	
2022	Malli Modalaindi	Judge	
2023	Organic Mama Hybrid Alludu	Haasini's prospective groom's father	
2023	Das Ka Dhamki	Sanjay’s uncle	
2023	Meter	Arjun’s girlfriend’s father	
2023	Bhuvana Vijayam		
2023	Boo	Cop	
2023	Unstoppable		
2023	Maya Petika	Corporator	
2023	Bro	Sambabu	
2023	Sound Party	MLA Varaprasad	
2023	Extra Ordinary Man	Yadav	
2023	Salaar: Part 1 – Ceasefire	Village Sarpanch	
2024	Inti No. 13		
2024	Vey Dharuvey	Puli Parasuram	
2024	Prathinidhi 2		
2024	Tiragabadara Saami		
2024	Swag	Ekambaram	
2024	Viswam	Jali Reddy	
2024	Zebra	Shrungara Samaram	
2024	Pranaya Godari		
2024	Dhoom Dhaam	Phani Sharma	
2025	Game Changer	Bobbili Mopidevi's assistant	
2025	Ramam Raghavam	Kasinadh	
2025	Dear Uma	Doctor	
2025	Jigel		
2026	Vanaveera	Doraswami	
2026	Sampradayini Suppini Suddapoosani	SI Veera Naidu	
2026	KJQ: King Jackie Queen	Film Producer	

=== Tamil films ===
Year	Title	Role	Notes
2006	Pudhupettai	Murthy	
2014	Koottam		Bilingual film
2021	Parris Jeyaraj	Prakash Raj	
2022	Beast	Veera's psychiatrist	
2023	Kannitheevu		
2023	Boo	Cop	
2024	Bloody Beggar	Kuberan	credited as Maruthi Prakash Raj
2025	Veera Dheera Sooran	"Periyavar" Ravi	credited as Maruthi Prakash Raj

=== Films in other languages ===
Year	Title	Role	Language
2008	Tathagatha Buddha	Minister	Hindi
2022	Rowdy Inspector		Bhojpuri

=== Television ===
Year	Title	Role	Channel	Notes
1995	Lady Detective		ETV	Episodes 71-72
