= 143 (2004 film) =

2004 film by Puri Jagannadh

143 (I Miss You)
- Movie Poster
- Directed by: Puri Jagannadh
- Written by: Puri Jagannadh
- Produced by: Puri Jagannadh
- Starring: Sairam Shankar; Samiksha; Flora Saini; Nagendra Babu; Brahmanandam
- Cinematography: Shyam K. Naidu
- Edited by: Marthand K. Venkatesh
- Music by: Chakri
- Production company: Vaishno Academy
- Release date: 27 August 2004
- Running time: 143 minutes
- Country: India
- Language: Telugu

143 is a 2004 Indian Telugu-language romantic action film directed, written, and produced by Puri Jagannadh, starring Sairam Shankar and Samiksha in the lead roles. Flora Saini, Nagendra Babu, Brahmanandam, Dharmavarapu Subramanyam, Brahmaji, M. S. Narayana and Ali play supporting roles.

The film was released on 27 August 2004 to mixed reviews from critics. The movie introduces Sairam Shankar, brother of director Puri Jagannadh as the lead actor. The soundtrack of the movie was composed by Indian music director Chakri.

== Plot ==
Siddu (Sairam Shankar) is a carefree boy-next-door. Sanjana (Samiksha) is a doting sister of four elder brothers. Siddu is like a family member in Sanjana's household. One fine day, Sanjana elopes with Siddu. And fate separates them. Sanjana goes into the protective hands of naxalites. Siddu lands up in the house of a journalist (Flora Saini). Siddu thinks Sanjana is dead. Sanjana thinks Siddu is no more. The rest of the story is all about how fate unites them again.

== Cast ==
- Sairam Shankar as Siddhu
- Samiksha as Sanjana
- Flora Saini as TV Reporter
- Nagendra Babu as DGP
- Brahmanandam as Interviewer Bramanandam
- Ali as Man asking for lift to Vijayawada
- Ramaraju as Sanjana's brother
- Brahmaji as Police officer
- Satya Prakash as Naxalite Leader
- Mallikarjuna Rao as Doctor Satyanaryana RMP
- M. S. Narayana as Patient
- Dharmavarapu Subramanyam as Police Inspector L. Gowtham
- Venu Madhav as Sanjana's potential groom
- Uttej as Tenant
- Bandla Ganesh as Tenant
- Srinivasa Reddy as Tenant
- Hema as Sanjana's relative
- Rajitha as Sanjana's relative
- Gundu Sudarshan as Priest
- Shobha Rani as Gowtham's wife

== Production ==
The film's shoot began in April of 2004 and was completed by 17 July.

== Soundtrack ==
The music was composed by Chakri. The audio launch was held at Viceroy (now Marriott) Hotel & Convention Centre, Hyderabad on 5 August 2004 with Raghu Kunche as the anchor.

143 (and i miss you)

Soundtrack album by Chakri
- Released: 5 August 2004
- Label: Maruthi Music

No.	Title	Lyrics	Singer(s)	Length
1.	"Endukani"	Kandikonda	Chakri	5:37
2.	"Kalalona"	Kandikonda	Chakri	4:44
3.	"Le Le Le Lelele Thalle..."	Thatha (Ammo Bomma fame)	Chakri, Pallavi	4:37
4.	"Orori Devuda"	Kandikonda	Ravivarma, Sunanda	4:33
5.	"Raragamai"	Chandrabose	Chakri, Kousalya	4:51
6.	"Tha Thadi"	Bhaskarabhatla Ravikumar	Aadarshini, Venu	3:56

== Reception ==
Jeevi of Idlebrain.com rated the film 3.25/5 and wrote, "The positive points of the film are Puri Jagan's story, screenplay, comedy and music. The negative point is dubbing of the hero and lack of love episodes (being a film that is titled as 143 (I love you)". A critic from Sify wrote, "On the whole the film will disappoint you".
