= Bachi (film) =

- Audio Cover
- Directed by: Puri Jagannadh
- Written by: Chintapalli Ramana (dialogues)
- Screenplay by: Puri Jagannadh
- Story by: Puri Jagannadh
- Produced by: Chanti Addala; V. Srinivas Reddy
- Starring: Jagapathi Babu; Neelambari; Prakash Raj
- Cinematography: V. Srinivasa Reddy
- Edited by: V. Nagi Reddy
- Music by: Chakri
- Production company: Srinivasa Arts
- Release date: 9 November 2000
- Country: India
- Language: Telugu

Bachi is a 2000 Indian Telugu-language comedy film directed by Puri Jagannadh. It stars Jagapathi Babu, Neelambari and Prakash Raj. The music was composed by Chakri with cinematography by V. Srinivasa Reddy and editing by V. Nagi Reddy. The film was released on 9 November 2000.

== Cast ==
- Jagapathi Babu as Bhaskar Chinmay "Baachi"
- Neelambari as Venkata Lakshmi
- Master Sajja Teja as Habibi
- Prakash Raj as Tatineni Koteswara Rao
- Kota Srinivasa Rao as Satyambabu
- Ali
- Yamuna as Parvathi
- Dharmavarapu Subramanyam as CP Gokarnam, Special Branch Chief
- AVS as Quarter Narayana, Venkatal Lakshmi's father
- Babloo Prithiveeraj as Baachi #2
- Chinna as S.I. Appalakonda
- Raghu Kunche as Raghu, Special Branch Officer
- Chitti Babu as Koyadora
- Uttej as Courier Boy
- Pruthviraj as Courier Office Manager
- Kaushal Manda as a Special Branch Officer in Bachi's Team
- Ananth Babu as Satyambabu's P.A.
- Krishna Chaitanya
- Junior Relangi as Constable
- Vidya as Jayamalini, Special Branch Officer
- Kalpana Rai as Bachi's neighbour
- Gautam Raju as Bachi's neighbour
- Narsing Yadav as Goon
- Tirupathi Prakash as Money lender
- Kadambari Kiran as Beggar

== Production ==
Newcomer Nilambari made her debut with this film and dubbed for herself. One of the schedules of the film was ongoing as of 13 September 2000 and ended on 19 September.

== Soundtrack ==
Baachi

Film score by Chakri
- Released: 2000
- Genre: Soundtrack
- Length: 25:06
- Label: His Master's Voice
- Producer: Chakri

Chakri chronology
Baachi (2000)	Athanu (2001)

The music was composed by Chakri in his debut as a music director.

No.	Title	Lyrics	Singer(s)	Length
1.	"Lachmi Lachmi"	Chandra Bose	Raghu Kunche, Smita	4:51
2.	"He Kundanala"	Kula Shekar	Chakri, Swarnalatha	4:50
3.	"O Chilaka"	Kula Shekar	Unni Krishnan, Kousalya	5:08
4.	"Habibi"	Kula Shekar	Mano, Gopika Poornima, Usha	5:12
5.	"Titanic"	Kula Shekar	Ravi Varma, Kousalya	5:05
Total length:				25:06

== Reception ==
A critic from Sify wrote that "The plot is thoda hatke (transl. a little different), so is the treatment. Now only, if the music was as good". A critic from Full Hyderabad wrote that "Despite spending so much money and acquiring all the gloss, the film does not get anywhere".
