= Puri Jagannadh =

Indian filmmaker (born 1966)

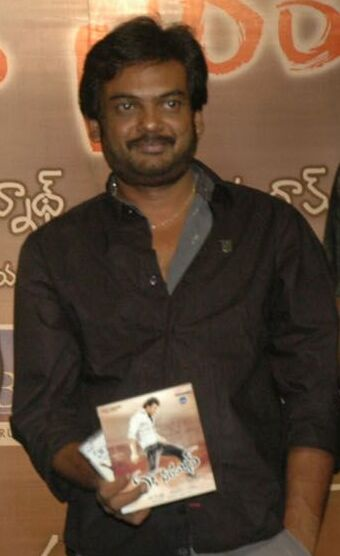
- Jagannadh in 2009
- Born: Petla Jagannadh; 28 September 1966 (age 60); Pithapuram, Andhra Pradesh, India
- Other names: Jagan and Puri
- Occupations: Director; producer; screenwriter
- Years active: 2000–present
- Spouse: Lavanya (m. 1996)
- Children: 2, including Akash Puri
- Relatives: Petla Uma Sankara Ganesh (younger brother); Sairam Shankar (youngest brother); Parasuram (cousin)

Petla "Puri" Jagannadh (born 28 September 1966) is an Indian film director, screenwriter, and producer, who works primarily in the Telugu film Industry. He made his directorial debut in 2000 with the Telugu film Badri starring Pawan Kalyan, Renu Desai and Ameesha Patel. In 2006, he directed the Telugu film Pokiri, premiered at the 7th IIFA Film Festival held in Dubai. The film was later re-made into several Indian languages, and brought Puri widespread Indian recognition. He made his Hindi film debut in 2004, with the film Shart: The Challenge. In 2011, he directed the Hindi film Bbuddah... Hoga Terra Baap starring Amitabh Bachchan, which was archived in the Oscar library.

He also produces films under his co-owned production companies, Puri Jagannadh Touring Talkies, Vaishno Academy and Puri Connects in partnership with actress Charmme Kaur. He owns a music company called Puri Sangeet. The box office hits that he directed include Badri, Itlu Sravani Subramanyam, Appu, Idiot, Amma Nanna O Tamila Ammayi, Sivamani, Pokiri, Desamuduru, Golimaar, Businessman, Iddarammayilatho, Heart Attack, Temper and iSmart Shankar.

== Early life ==
Puri Jagannadh was born on 28 September 1966 in Pithapuram, Andhra Pradesh. His native place is Bapiraju Kothapalli village of Anakapalli district in Andhra Pradesh. He was schooled at St. Theresa High School, Pedda Boddapalli and graduated from A. M. A. L. College, Anakapalle in 1986.

His first younger brother, Petla Uma Sankara Ganesh, is a former MLA from Narsipatnam, YSR Congress Party, while second younger brother, Sairam Shankar, is an actor.

He married Lavanya in 1996. The couple has a son, Akash and a daughter, Pavithra. Akash made his film debut as a lead in Mehbooba (2018).

His paternal cousin, Parasuram, assisted Puri in several movies before making his directorial debut with Yuvatha (2008).

== Career ==
Puri started his film directorial career as an assistant director to Ram Gopal Varma for several Telugu films mainly of action genre. His Telugu film directorial debut, Badri starred Pawan Kalyan. Apart from Telugu films, he has also worked in the Kannada film industry and introduced Puneeth Rajkumar with the film Appu. In 2011 he worked with Amitabh Bachchan in the film Bbuddah... Hoga Terra Baap.

In 2022, Jagannadh directed action film Liger, which was produced by Dharma Productions and Charmme Kaur. It stars Vijay Deverakonda and Ananya Panday in lead roles. The film was a box-office disappointment.

== Filmography ==
Key
†	Denotes films that have not yet been released

=== As director ===
Year	Title	Language	Notes	Ref.
2000	Badri	Telugu		
2000	Bachi	Telugu		
2001	Yuvaraja	Kannada	Remake of Thammudu (1999), which itself was based on Jo Jeeta Wohi Sikandar (1992), which in turn was inspired by Breaking Away (1979)	
2001	Itlu Sravani Subramanyam	Telugu	Nandi Award for Best Story Writer	
2002	Appu	Kannada	Cinema Express Award for Best Director – Kannada; Cinema Express Award for Best Film – Kannada	
2002	Idiot	Telugu	Remake of Appu	
2003	Amma Nanna O Tamila Ammayi	Telugu	Nandi Award for Best Dialogue Writer	
2003	Sivamani	Telugu		
2004	Andhrawala	Telugu		
2004	Shart: The Challenge	Hindi	Remake of Badri	
2004	143	Telugu		
2005	Super	Telugu		
2006	Pokiri	Telugu	Filmfare Award for Best Director – Telugu; Santosham Best Director Award	
2007	Desamuduru	Telugu		
2007	Chirutha	Telugu		
2008	Bujjigadu	Telugu		
2008	Neninthe	Telugu	Nandi Award for Best Dialogue Writer	
2009	Ek Niranjan	Telugu		
2010	Golimaar	Telugu		
2011	Nenu Naa Rakshasi	Telugu		
2011	Bbuddah... Hoga Terra Baap	Hindi		
2012	Businessman	Telugu	Santosham Best Director Award; Nominated—SIIMA Award for Best Director – Telugu	
2012	Devudu Chesina Manushulu	Telugu		
2012	Cameraman Gangatho Rambabu	Telugu		
2013	Iddarammayilatho	Telugu		
2014	Heart Attack	Telugu		
2015	Temper	Telugu		
2015	Jyothi Lakshmi	Telugu		
2015	Loafer	Telugu		
2016	Ism	Telugu	Also playback singer	
2017	Rogue	Telugu; Kannada	Bilingual film	
2017	Paisa Vasool	Telugu		
2018	Mehbooba	Telugu		
2019	iSmart Shankar	Telugu		
2022	Liger	Telugu; Hindi	Bilingual film	
2024	Double iSmart	Telugu		
2026	Slumdog: 33 Temple Road †	Telugu	Post-Production	

=== As producer ===
Year	Title	Language	Notes	Ref.
2002	Idiot	Telugu	Remake of Appu	
2003	Amma Nanna O Tamila Ammayi	Telugu		
2003	Sivamani	Telugu		
2004	143	Telugu		
2006	Pokiri	Telugu	Nandi Award for Best Popular Feature Film	
2007	Hello Premistara	Telugu		
2009	Bumper Offer	Telugu		
2011	Bbuddah... Hoga Terra Baap	Hindi		
2014	Heart Attack	Telugu		
2018	Mehbooba	Telugu		
2019	iSmart Shankar	Telugu		
2021	Romantic	Telugu		
2022	Liger	Telugu; Hindi	Bilingual film	
2024	Double iSmart	Telugu		

=== As writer ===
This is a list of films that he wrote for but did not direct.

Year	Title	Language	Writer	Notes	Ref.
2003	Anaganaga O Kurraadu	Telugu	Story		
2004	Veera Kannadiga	Kannada	Yes	Simultaneously shot alongside Andhrawala	
2009	Bumper Offer	Telugu	Story and dialogues		
2014	Romeo	Telugu	Yes		

=== As actor ===
- Shiva (1990; Hindi) as Shiva's friend
- Ye Maaya Chesave (2010) as himself
- Businessman (2012) as a taxi driver
- Temper (2015) as a biker
- Ism (2016) as a hotel customer
- ISmart Shankar (2019) as himself
- Romantic (2021) as himself in a song
- Liger (2022) as himself in the song "Coka 2.0"
- Godfather (2022) as Govardhan
- Ori Devuda (2022) as himself
- Double iSmart (2024) as himself in the song "SteppaMaar"
