= The Family Man (soundtrack) =

Soundtrack album from television series

The Family Man: Music from the Original Series

Soundtrack album by Various Artists
- Released: 2019–2021
- Genre: Amazon Original Series Soundtrack
- Languages: Hindi; Balochi; Kashmiri; Tamil; Malayalam; Sanskrit
- Label: Amazon Music

The Family Man: Music from the Original Series is the original soundtrack album for the Amazon Prime Original television series of the same name, featuring various artists contributed to the soundtrack album. The album consists of songs with Balochi, Kashmiri, Malayalam, Tamil and Sanskrit lyrics, apart from featuring songs written in Hindi languages.

== Background ==
Raj Nidimoru and Krishna D.K. believed that music and songs play a key role in "uplifting the entertainment factor in a spy thriller series" and when comes to web series, "the scope of a soundtrack and score is considerably bigger than a feature film, and contrary to films, "the commercial side of the series takes a back seat and they may have a lot more songs and explore different genres". Being a fan of indie and Indian classical music, both Raj and DK approached composers, musicians and artists across the country and chose tracks and sounds of their album, as the duo believed that "it will go well with the story". The album for the two-season series, has a combination of classical and original numbers, which was positively received upon release.

== Development ==
The soundtrack for the first season has fourteen songs used in the series. One song "Dega Jaan" composed by Sachin–Jigar, was released as the promotional single track on Amazon Music. It was unveiled on 16 September 2019, through music streaming platforms and as a video song through YouTube.

The soundtrack has music composed by Sachin–Jigar, Divya Limbasia, Mahesh Shankar, The Local Train, Jaan Nissar Lone, Aabha Hanjura, Thaikkudam Bridge and Underground Authority, and lyrics written by Irshad Kamil, Divya Limbasia, Gulshan Irfan Khanday, Mahesh Shankar, Piyush Kapoor, The Local Train, Jaan Nissar Lone, Aabha Hanjura, Thaikkudam Bridge and Underground Authority. The background score is composed by Ketan Sodha, also for the second season. Two tracks from Thaikkudam Bridge's independent music album Navarasam (2015), were reused in the series.

For second season, the previous track "Dega Jaan" was recreated with Tamil lyrics. The album featured seven tracks, including the recreated title track, contributed by the Pune-based Indie band Fiddlecraft (Gaurav Kadu and Sudeep Shetty), Mahesh Shankar and Shobha Raja. In addition to the soundtrack, three songs were reused: "Vainko", a song curated by Brodha V, which was earlier released with a promotional video featuring Nasser-Al-Azeh and Vineeth Kumar of Jordindian fame to positive response. The track "Beta Sweater Pehno" released as an independent single by the band Swarathma, went popular after the series' release. "Unnara Vaithai", a Tamil-independent number by Bindhumalini Narayanaswamy and Prakash Sontakke, and "Kho Gaye Hain Wo" by Harpreet were also featured in the series. Padma Shri-awardee Shobha Raju, recorded the Sanskrit song "Kanda Kumara".

== Track listing ==
=== Season 1 ===
The Family Man: Season 1 (Music from the Original Series)

Soundtrack album by Various Artists
- Released: 23 September 2019
- Recorded: 2019
- Genre: Amazon Original Series Soundtrack
- Languages: Hindi; Balochi; Kashmiri; Tamil; Malayalam
- Label: Amazon Music

Singles from The Family Man
- 1. "Dega Jaan" Released: 16 September 2019

The Family Man: Season 1
No.	Title	Lyrics	Music	Singers	Length
1.	"Kiske Liye Tu Dega Jaan"	Jigar Saraiya, Mellow D	Sachin–Jigar	Shreya Ghoshal, Mellow D	3:10
2.	"Banjara"	Divya Limbasia	Divya Limbasia	Ved Jamsandekar	5:00
3.	"Gol O Pullani" (Balochi)	Gulshan Irfan Khanday	Mahesh Shankar	Gulshan Irfan Khanday	4:37
4.	"Khudi"	The Local Train	The Local Train	The Local Train	2:29
5.	"Harmukh Bartal" (Kashmiri Folk)	Jaan Nissar Lone	Jaan Nissar Lone	Jaan Nissar Lone, Sniti Mishra	4:53
6.	"Hukus Bukus" (Kashmiri Folk)	Aabha Hanjura	Aabha Hanjura	Aabha Hanjura	3:04
7.	"Navarasam" (Malayalam)	Thaikkudam Bridge	Thaikkudam Bridge	Thaikkudam Bridge	6:45
8.	"Inbam" (Tamil)	Mahesh Shankar	Mahesh Shankar	Anita Udeep	4:29
9.	"Aarachar" (Malayalam)	Thaikkudam Bridge	Thaikkudam Bridge	Thaikkudam Bridge	5:31
10.	"Naalai" (Tamil)	Mahesh Shankar	Mahesh Shankar	Mahesh Shankar	4:16
11.	"Ilaahi"	Piyush Kapoor	Divya Limbasia	Piyush Kapoor	2:41
12.	"Pehchaan"	Underground Authority	Underground Authority	Underground Authority	3:28
13.	"Hukus Bukus" (Rock Version)	Divya Limbasia	Divya Limbasia	Suraj Biswas	2:55
14.	"Kiske Liye Tu Marega"	Jigar Saraiya, Mellow D	Sachin–Jigar	Shreya Ghoshal, Mellow D	3:09

=== Season 2 ===
The Family Man: Season 2 (Music from the Original Series)

Soundtrack album by Various Artists
- Released: 7 June 2021
- Recorded: 2020–2021
- Genre: Amazon Original Series Soundtrack
- Languages: Hindi; Tamil; Sanskrit
- Label: Amazon Music

The Family Man: Season 2
No.	Title	Lyrics	Music	Singers	Length
1.	"Dega Jaan"	Jigar Saraiya, Mellow D	Sachin–Jigar	Shreya Ghoshal, Mellow D	3:10
2.	"Chal Ghar Wapas Chale"	Fiddlecraft	Fiddlecraft	Fiddlecraft	3:31
3.	"Maya" (Tamil)	Mahesh Shankar	Mahesh Shankar	Sumitra Guha, Mahesh Shankar, Sheetal Nidimoru, Sahitya Srinivasan	2:53
4.	"Aahaa Bhoomi" (Tamil)	Mahesh Shankar	Mahesh Shankar	Hariharasudhan, Mahesh Shankar, Ramesh Chellamani, Sahitya Srinivasan	2:16
5.	"Toofan"	Fiddlecraft	Fiddlecraft	Fiddlecraft	1:54
6.	"Kanda Kumara" (Sanskrit)	Shobha Raja	Shobha Raja	Shobha Raja	6:53
7.	"Andherey"	Fiddlecraft	Fiddlecraft	Fiddlecraft	3:10

== Songs ==
Season 1

- "Dega Jaan" – Promotional track for the series
- "Kiske Liye Tu Marega" – Episode 1 & 10
- "Banjara" – Episode 2
- "Gol O Pullani" (Balochi) – Episode 2
- "Khudi" – Episode 3
- "Harmukh Bartal" (Kashmir folk) – Episode 4
- "Hukus Bukus" (Kashmiri folk) – Episode 5
- "Inbam" (Tamil) – Episode 5
- "Naalai" (Tamil) – Episode 6
- "Ilaahi" – Episode 7
- "Pehchaan" – Episode 8
- "Hukus Bukus" (Rock version) – Episode 9

Season 2

- "Dega Jaan" – Promotional track, recreated with Tamil lyrics
- "Chal Ghar Wapas Chale" – Episode 1 & 2
- "Maya" (Telugu) – Episode 4
- "Aahaa Bhoomi" (Tamil) – Episode 5
- "Toofan" – Episode 6
- "Kanda Kumara" (Sanskrit) – Episode 7
- "Andherey" – Episode 8 & 9

=== Reused tracks ===
- "Navarasa" ft. Thaikkudam Bridge (Malayalam) – Season 1; Episode 5
- "Aarachar" ft. Thaikkudam Bridge (Malayalam) – Season 1; Episode 6
- "Vainko" ft. Brodha V – Season 2; Episode 3
- "Unnara Vaithai" ft. Bindhumalini Narayanaswamy and Prakash Sontakke (Tamil) – Season 2; Episode 3
- "Beta Sweater Pehno" ft. Swarathma – Season 2; Episode 4
- "Kho Gaye Hain Wo" ft. Harpreet – Season 2; Episode 7

== Reception ==
The Rolling Stone India-based critic Tanushi Bhatnagar called the soundtrack had "succeeded to amalgamate Tamil classical melodies with Hindi and English rap and electronic beats, all packed in a short nine-parter series", further calling it as "aptly reflective of the story" and "the emotion throughout the show as a mix of genres is put to the test fruitfully".
