= Udeep =

Udeep may refer to:

- Udeep tribe, Indian tribe
- Anita Udeep (born 1978), Indian screenwriter
