= Navarasam =

2015 studio album by Thaikkudam Bridge

Navarasam (An Ennead)

Studio album by Thaikkudam Bridge
- Released: 21 October 2015 (Digital); 9 November 2015 (Compact disc)
- Recorded: August 2014 – 2015
- Studios: Noise Head Quarters, Kochi; Sound Garden, Pondicherry
- Genres: R&B; rock; pop; EDM; Indian folk; Hindustani classical; death metal; jazz; Sufi music
- Length: 55:05
- Languages: Malayalam; Tamil; Hindi
- Labels: Satyam Audios; Mathrubhumi Music
- Producer: Thaikkudam Bridge

Thaikkudam Bridge chronology
Navarasam (2015)	Namah (2019)

Singles from Namah
- 1. "One" Released: 30 September 2015

Navarasam (transl. Nine emotions) is the debut studio album produced by the band Thaikkudam Bridge. The album features nine songs, as per its title, and explores various themes such as political satire, social inequality and historic stories from the Mughal era. It is the first multi-lingual studio album to be produced in Malayalam, Tamil and Hindi.

Following the success of their maiden original single "Fish Rock", the band decided to work on a studio album consisting original songs, as they had produced only cover versions of film and album songs since their inception and popularity in Music Mojo, a Kappa TV television show. Siddharth Menon, singer and cousin of frontman Govind Menon, suggested this idea and eventually the recording works for the album began in August 2014 and were completed within a year. As a part of its promotion, the music video of the track "One" was released on YouTube and other digital platforms on 30 September 2015. It gained 100,000 views within hours of its release.

The album was released in digital formats on 21 October 2015 and a physical release was held in Kochi and Dubai on 9 November 2015. The album was also launched in Dubai, at the concert where the band had performed. The album gained highly positive response from music critics and eventually the band got nationwide popularity. They performed all the songs in leading international concert tours. The music videos for the tracks "Aarachar" and the title track "Navarasam" were released and became popular among audiences.

== Development ==
Thaikkudam Bridge debuted in 2013 with the television show Music Mojo, a program aired on Kappa TV, which is based for independent music artists. The band gained popularity by performing cover versions of film songs — notably, "Khwaja Mere Khwaja" from Jodhaa Akbar (2008) and "Tum Hi Ho" from Aashiqui 2 (2013). During the period, they performed an original song titled "Fish Rock", a death metal composition. It is based on the band's love for fish fry, a popular food in the coastal regions of Kerala. Released in August 2014, had opened to wide response and gained more than 3 million views in YouTube and Facebook; its success attributed to the "lyrics which uses colloquial Malayalam references from Cochin" resulted in being an instant hit with the local fanbase.

The success of the song prompted the team to produce an original album in the following month, as Menon, a cousin of the band's frontman and film composer Govind Menon, suggested him to do so; the band had produced cover versions and medley of film songs, ever since its inception in 2013. In order to experiment on independent music, they decided to create the studio album as a multi-lingual and multi-genre project; the songs consist of rhythm and blues, electronic dance music, death metal, trance music, rock-and-pop fused with Hindustani classical, Indian folk, Sufi music, and songs will feature lyrics in Malayalam, Tamil and Hindi languages, which is first-of-a-kind for an indie album.

== Themes ==
The title Navarasam is based on the Indian concept of the Rasa (aesthetics) and a song also released in the same name, serving as a tribute to Kathakali, a popular classical dance in Kerala. A classical rock number, the song is about the "commercialisation of the art form" and how it "exhorts the practitioners to revive the dance". The songs in the album features themes such as equality, politics, history and mythology. One of the tracks titled "Sultan" looks at the "untold stories of the Mughal empire". Mithun Raju, the lead guitarist of the band said that "the team had went on a research to study about the life of Mughals; thereby revealing the dark and murky side of the rule apart from knowing the glorious side in their period". The album also featured a devotional song titled "Jai Hanuman", which is a "pure, progressive rock track in the album based on the concept of awakening" and "Viduthalai", a poem written by Mahakavi Subramaniya Bharathiyar was also included. Another track "Aarachar" was based on "the black world of Indian politics". Govind Menon, the frontman of Thaikkudam Bridge said that two of the tracks "Khwab" and "Urumbu" were light-hearted soul music, the former being focused on "aspirations and dreams" and Urumbu (translating to ants) is based on the relationship between man and ants. The lead single from the album titled "One" is mostly about the celebration of the soul and soil of Kerala and its people. For recording the track, the band travelled from Kasaragod to Thiruvananthapuram in a 25-day journey, during the Onam festival, and shot frames of Puli Kali, boat race, tug of war and several other events happened during the festival. The director of the video song Littil Swayamp said that "Everything is real, nothing has been staged, neither the emotions nor the expressions".

== Track list ==
All music is composed by Thaikkudam Bridge.

No.	Title	Lyrics	Artist(s)	Length
1.	"Navarasam"	Dhanya Suresh	Vipin Lal	6:34
2.	"Sultan"	Piyush Kapoor	Anish Krishnan	4:04
3.	"Urumbu"	Dhanya Suresh	Christin Jose, Govind Menon, Vipin Lal, Anish Krishnan	5:13
4.	"Aarachar"	Dhanya Suresh	Govind Menon	6:51
5.	"Jai Hanuman"	—	Thaikkudam Bridge	4:31
6.	"Khwaab"	Dr. Gajanan Mitke	Krishna Bongane, Nila Madhab Mohapatra, Govind Menon, Anish Krishnan	7:13
7.	"Chathe"	Dhanya Suresh	Peethambaran Menon	4:38
8.	"One"	Dhanya Suresh	Siddharth Menon	4:29
9.	"Viduthalai"	Mahakavi Subramaniya Bharatiyar	Anish Krishnan	4:20
10.	"Shiva"	Dr. Gajanan Mitke	Krishna Bongane, Nila Madhab Mohapatra, Govind Menon, Anish Krishnan	7:07
Total length:				55:05

== Release ==
The multi-genre album has two Hindi, four Malayalam and three Tamil-language tracks. The track "One" was released as the lead single on 30 September 2015 through music streaming platforms. Following the success of the single track, the band members released the entire album in digital platforms on 21 October 2015 which was marketed by Satyam Audios for digital download. On 9 November, the producers launched the album in physical formats in Kochi and also performed the album in a live concert in Dubai on the same day, where the physical formats of the album was also launched. Mathrubhumi Music acquired the rights for the audio album and distributed the music CDs. "Chathe", performed by the band which released as an independent single earlier in late-2014, was included in the album.

== Music video ==
The music video of the lead single "One" was released on 30 September 2015, coinciding the track's digital release and gained more than 100,000 views within hours of its release. The video directed and edited by Littil Swayamp captures the expressions, emotions, moments, places and people of Kerala, which gained accolades from audience. Post the album-release, the makers also unveiled the studio versions of the tracks in YouTube following its launch on 21 October, while they had planned for the videos which will be directed by established filmmakers.

Bejoy Nambiar was hired to direct the music video for the track "Aarachar" which had visuals by Ravi Varman. On the music video, Nambiar said that the visuals will have "fire-starter quality", further saying that "I deliberately wanted to get out of a narrative based approach and try and do something completely different in the treatment. The style and the grandness was planned to give the video a wider appeal". The video featured actress Aditi Rao Hydari as a Goth princess. The music video was launched at an event held in Mumbai on 5 February 2016 with the presence of prominent Bollywood celebrities. On 7 May 2016, the makers unveiled the video song of "Sultan" which was edited and directed by R. Mahesh Kumar. The music video of "Navarasam" was unveiled on 11 January 2017, which was directed, filmed and edited by Littil Swayamp.

== Reception ==
Vipin Nair of Music Aloud called the album as a "solid debut from Thaikkudam Bridge that manages to produce songs fitting the diverse vocal range of its singers, all the while staying anchored to the rock base. A debut that proves beyond doubt that the band has come a long way from its cover song days." Karthik Srinivasan of Milliblog called the album as an "exhilarating debut from one of India’s most promising bands". Ramesh of Assorted Collections listed the tracks "Navarasam" and "One" as one of "the best indie-pop albums" in their Music Round-Up 2015 review. The music video of "Aarachar" from the album was praised by a critic from BollywoodLife.com who said that "The music from the band is really at another level. The heavy music, the heavier sounding guitars and the ceaseless drums will just pump you up. Govind Menon's mellow voice when combined with the hardcore music, makes for a very interesting contrast". Commenting about the visuals, he said that "it almost looks like something out of a horror movie with all the dark effects, and the image of the grim reaper with the trademark sickle and black cloak". The video song of "Navarasam" also gained positive response from notable members of the film fraternity, including composer A. R. Rahman and actor Kamal Haasan, who praised the visuals and music and called it as a "commendable effort".

== Legacy ==
With Navarasam, the band Thaikkudam Bridge emerged popularity among music listeners. For their second album titled Namah, which was considered as their ambitious album and took two long years for production, the band had got the opportunity to collaborate with renowned Indian and international artists, as they had listened to the tracks of this album. The album's success prompted the band perform at international tours, including the 2019 edition of Summerfest (a 11-day music festival held at Wisconsin, United States, which was certified by the Guinness World Records as "The World’s Largest Music Festival"), thus becoming the first Indian band to be performed at the event. Thaikkudam Bridge performed all the songs from Navarasam, along with two of the independent compositions from Namah.

Two of the compositions from Navarasam, including "Aarachar" and the titular track, gained the most consumer response and were used in the Indian web series, The Family Man. The band's frontrunner Govind Vasantha later became a leading music composer in Tamil and Malayalam films, and scored for films such as Solo (2017), Asuravadham and 96 (2018), whose album earned critical acclaim for the compositions. Govind also recreated the tune phrase from the song "Urumbu" and included in "Aagasam" from Soorarai Pottru composed by G. V. Prakash Kumar.

== Personnel ==
Credits adapted from CD liner notes and the official website of Thaikkudam Bridge

- Thaikkudam Bridge – Musical composition and production
- Govind Menon – Violin, Mandolin
- Mithun Raju – Lead guitar, Ukulele
- Ashok Nelson – Rhythm, Bass guitar
- Ruthin Thej – Keyboard
- Vian Fernandes – Bass
- Anish TN – Drums
- Vishnu Sreekumar – Chenda, Elathalam, Kombu
- Rajan KS – Audio mixing
- Amith Bal – Audio mixing
- Hemanth Mukundan – Audio mixing
- Vivek Thomas – Audio mastering
- Joel Wanasek – Audio mastering
- Recorded at – Noise Headquarters (Kochi), Sound Garden (Pondicherry)
- Sujith Unnithan – Studio manager
