= 90ml =

90ML may refer to:

- 90 ML (2019 Tamil film), an Indian Tamil-language film
- 90ML (2019 Telugu film), an Indian Telugu-language film
