= Family Man =

Family Man may refer to:

== Film ==
- The Family Man (1979 film), American drama starring Ed Asner
- The Family Man, American 2000 romantic comedy/drama starring Nicolas Cage
- A Family Man, American 2016 drama starring Gerard Butler

== Television ==
- Family Man (American TV series), 1988 American sitcom starring Richard Libertini and Mimi Kennedy
- The Family Man (American TV series), 1990–91 American sitcom starring Gregory Harrison
- The Family Man (British TV series), 2006 British three-part medical drama
- Family Man (Hong Kong TV series), 2002 Hong Kong drama
- The Family Man (Indian TV series), 2019 Indian action drama
- "The Family Man", a 1954 episode of The Motorola Television Hour
- "Family Man" (FBI), a 2018 episode
- "Family Man" (Fear Itself), a 2008 episode

== Literature ==
=== Comics ===
- "Family Man", daily strip created in 1940 by Reginald Ernest ("Reg") Hicks for The Sun (Sydney)
- Family Man, a 1995 graphic novel written by Jerome Charyn and illustrated by Joe Staton

=== Fiction ===
- Family Man, a 1992 novel by Jayne Ann Krentz
- Family Man, a 1996 novel by Rosemary Carter
- The Family Man, a 1942 novel by Anne Meredith
- The Family Man, a 1974 novel by Robin Moore with Milt Machlin
- The Family Man, a 1982 novel by Joseph Monninger
- The Family Man, a 1988 novel by Todd Strasser
- The Family Man, a 1993 novel by Ian Cross
- The Family Man, a 2006 novel by Irene Hannon
- The Family Man, a 2009 novel by Elinor Lipman
- The Family Man, a 2016 novel by T. J. Lebbon
- The Family Man, a 2021 novel by Kimberley Chambers

=== Non-fiction ===
- Family Man, a 1998 book by Calvin Trillin

=== Plays ===
- A Family Man, a 1921 play by John Galsworthy

== Music ==
- "Family Man", song by James Taylor from In the Pocket, 1976
- Family Man (Jaki Byard album), 1978
- "Family Man" (Mike Oldfield song), 1982, covered by Daryl Hall and John Oates in 1983
- Family Man (Black Flag album), 1984
- "Family Man" (Fleetwood Mac song), 1987
- "Family Man", a 1988 song by Roachford from Roachford
- "Family Man", a 1991 song by Nitzer Ebb from the EP As Is and album Ebbhead
- "Family Man" (Craig Campbell song), 2010
- Family Man, a 2012 album by Shooter Jennings
- "Family Man", a 2018 song by Lily Allen from No Shame
- The Family Man (soundtrack), music from the 2019 Hindi-language television series

== People ==
- Aston "Family Man" Barrett (born 1946), Jamaican reggae musician

== See also ==
- Family Guy, 1999 American animated sitcom
