= Gummalam =

2002 Tamil-language film

- Directed by: Sugi S. Moorthy
- Written by: Sugi S. Moorthy
- Produced by: A. Kanthasamy
- Starring: Mithun Tejaswi; Adithya; Ganesh; Zakeer; Rathi
- Cinematography: Krishna
- Edited by: Rahubob
- Music by: Gandhidasan
- Production company: Sharmatha Productions
- Release date: 29 November 2002
- Country: India
- Language: Tamil

Gummalam (transl. Excitement) is a 2002 Indian Tamil-language teen film. Sugi S. Moorthy directed this film featuring newcomers Mithun Tejaswi, Rathi, Akash, Ganesh and Zakeer.

== Cast ==
- Mithun Tejaswi as Dinesh
- R. Ganesh as Sekhar
- Adithya as Uncle
- Zakeer as Iyyappan
- Rathi as Anu
- Kazan Khan
- Vineetha
- Kaka Radhakrishnan
- Ponnambalam
- Vasu Vikram
- Ravikumar
- Selvam
- Murali Mohan
- Typist Gopu
- Kavitha
- Gowthami Vembunathan

== Production ==
This was the second film produced by Kandhasamy after Sethu (1999) and it marked the directorial debut of Suki S. Murthy who earlier assisted Selva. The film was primarily shot at Ooty. The cinematographer Krishna previously worked as an assistant to Santosh Sivan. Two of the songs were shot at Rameswaram and Ooty.

== Soundtrack ==
Soundtrack was composed by Gandhidasan.

- "Thitranga" – Tippu
- "Kaatre" – Sujatha
- "Yaaro" – Unni Menon
- "Dhimsukattai" – Timmy
- "Ovvoru Naalum" – P. Unnikrishnan

== Reception ==
The Hindu wrote, "if the story hardly affects you at any point, it is the treatment which leaves much to be desired". Visual Dasan of Kalki wrote while the refugee camp flashback at the end of the vibrant film has more density and depth, Vinita's character and the imposed songs are occasional reminders that Kummalam is commercial cinema. Malini Mannath of Chennai Online wrote "That the director is a debutant is no excuse, he should have been better prepared before he ventured. Surprising, that it's the same banner that produced a film like 'Sethu'!". Sify wrote "It is absolutely a lamebrained film as the story and situations are totally corny. However the new comers Mithun, Rati, Tejaswini and Ganesh have come out with decent performances. The songs are below average".
