= Mahesh Shankar =

Indian music director

- Occupation: Music director
- Years active: 2002–present
- Spouse: Shuba

Mahesh Shankar is an Indian music director who primarily works in Telugu cinema and is known for his associations with Raj & DK.

== Personal life and career ==
Mahesh Shankar did his bachelor's of engineering degree at Sri Venkateswara College of Engineering where he performed alongside Drums Sivamani, Vikku Vinayaka Ram, Ganesh and Kumaresh and V. Selvaganesh. He received his master's degree from North Carolina State University and lived in Hayward, California. He was associated with Anita Udeep for her Tamil music album Mugangal (2002). He worked on two Indian English films: Udeep's Knock Knock, I'm Looking to Marry (2003) and Raj & DK's Flavors (2003). He worked with Ganesh and Kumaresh on the end credits track for Dance Like a Man (2004).

== Discography ==
Year	Title	Language	Notes
2002	Mugangal	Tamil	Music album
2003	Knock Knock, I'm Looking to Marry	English	
2003	Flavors	English; Hindi; Telugu	
2005	Vennela	Telugu	
2009	Prayanam	Telugu	
2010	Prasthanam	Telugu	
2011	Vaareva	Telugu	
2013	D for Dopidi	Telugu	
2016	Manamantha	Telugu	
2017	Endukila	Telugu	TV series
2019	The Family Man	Hindi	TV series; songs in Tamil and Balochi

== Filmography ==
Year	Title	Role	Language	Notes
2003	Flavors	Gita's dad	English	Voice role
