= Knock Knock, I'm Looking to Marry =

Indian romantic drama film

- DVD cover
- Directed by: Anita Udeep
- Written by: Anita Udeep
- Produced by: Anita Udeep
- Starring: Rathi; Suhaas Ahuja
- Cinematography: Preetha Jayaraman
- Edited by: Sundeep V Menon
- Music by: Mahesh Shankar
- Production companies: N-Viz Entertainment; Pentamedia
- Release date: 26 December 2003
- Running time: 150 minutes
- Country: India
- Language: English
- Budget: ₹80-85 lakh
- Box office: ₹3.5 lakh

Knock Knock, I'm Looking to Marry is a 2003 Indian English-language romance film directed by Anita Udeep and starring Rathi and Suhaas Ahuja.

The film is about the dilemma faced by the newer generation about whether to love someone first or to marry them first and love them afterwards.

== Plot ==
24-year-old Nithya, a Tamil Brahmin software engineer working for a MNC, is pressured by her parents to get married in the next two months. Her parents try to find her a groom through arranged marriage. Meanwhile, 26-year-old Sandeep, a Punjabi software engineer also working for a MNC, is confident to find a girl for himself. Nithya and Sandeep meet in an acting class and become friends. Eventually, Nithya and Sandeep realised that they are in love.

== Cast ==
- Rathi as Nithya
- Suhaas Ahuja as Sandeep
- A. C. Murali Mohan as Nithya's father
- Geetha Ravishankar as Nithya's mother
- Bagiarathy Narayanan

== Production ==
Anita Udeep made her directorial debut through this film, which shows the difference between parents and their children's way of thinking. This film marked the film debut of Suhaas Ahuja after his other two films during that time did not release. This film marked the independent debut of Preetha Jayaraman, the daughter of P. C. Sreeram. The film was shot in Bangalore and Chennai.

== Soundtrack ==
The music features seven tracks by Mahesh Shankar that were shortened into one-minute bit songs. The songs were promoted on SS Music.

== Release and reception ==
The film was released in Bangalore, Chennai and Hyderabad (in three prints including Prasads Multiplex) on 26 December 2003.

Suresh Krishnamoorthy of The Hindu wrote that "The film has good and pleasant, racy music that would appeal to the youth by Mahesh Shankar" and added that "Special mention is required for the cinematography by Preetha Jeyaraman [...] A majority of the indoor scenes reveal the liberal use of cross-lighting, which has a natural look. The use of very little make-up for the artistes has helped retain the originality of the character".
