= Allari Bullodu =

- DVD cover
- Directed by: K. Raghavendra Rao
- Produced by: Anil Kumar Koneru
- Starring: Nithiin; Trisha; Rathi
- Cinematography: S. K. A. Bhupathi
- Edited by: A. Sreekar Prasad
- Music by: M. M. Keeravani
- Release date: 15 September 2005
- Running time: 175 minutes
- Country: India
- Language: Telugu

Allari Bullodu is a 2005 Indian Telugu-language action comedy film stars Nithiin, Trisha and Rathi. The film is directed by K. Raghavendra Rao. The score and soundtrack was composed by M. M. Keeravani, was released in September 2005 and it was an average grosser at the box office.

== Plot ==
Madhava Rao is a big businessman and his competitor Saxena is a crook. When Madhav Rao meets with an accident, his daughter Trisha takes over the company. Raju comes from nowhere to help Trisha. Trisha appoints Raju as general manager. Trisha has an inseparable younger sister called Usha. Due to certain circumstances, Raju forces himself to disguise as Balu and Usha falls in love with Balu. As the confusion about mixed identities continue, Munna - another lookalike of Raju - comes from Mumbai. Munna is a right hand of Karim Lala - a Mumbai underworld don. The rest of the story is all about what happens when Munna try to destroy the family which Raju intend to save.

== Cast ==
- Nithiin as Raju a.k.a. Balu / Munna [Double Role]
- Trisha as Trisha
- Rathi as Usha
- Sunil as Babji
- Saurabh Shukla as Karim Lala
- Telangana Shakuntala as Nellore Naiduamma
- Brahmanandam as Nellore Naiduamma's husband
- Vizag Prasad as Madhava Rao (Trisha's father)
- Satya Prakash as Saxena
- Kota Srinivasa Rao
- Ali
- Krishna Bhagavan
- Sudha
- Jayalalitha
- Tanikella Bharani as Raju's father
- Venu Madhav
- Dharmavarapu Subramanyam
- Chitram Srinu

== Music ==
The music and background score was composed by M. M. Keeravani.

Track list
No.	Title	Lyrics	Music	Artist(s)	Length
1.	"Andamantee Evaridhi"	Chandrabose	M. M. Keeravani	SPB. Charan, Sunitha	5:01
2.	"Noppi Noppi Emi Noppi"		M. M. Keeravani	Udit Narayan, Shreya Ghoshal	4:01
3.	"Dashukunte Dhanadhan"	Chandrabose	M. M. Keeravani	Devi Sri Prasad, Chitra	4:21
4.	"Trisha Achata Ichata"	Chandrabose	M. M. Keeravani	M. M. Keeravani, Chitra	4:12
5.	"Mogavada Mathi Poyara"	Chandrabose	M. M. Keeravani	Tippu, Shweta Pandit	4:47
6.	"Ataka Meeda Undhamo"	Chandrabose	M. M. Keeravani	Jassie Gift, Sunidhi Chauhan	3:45

== Reception ==
The Hindu noted that "The film looks cinematic with no logic and only the saving grace is performances by Nitin and Trisha".
