= Harpreet =

Harpreet may refer to

- Harpreet Sawhney, engineer
- Harpreet Sandhu (actor), actor and filmmaker
- Harpreet Sandhu (politician), Indian American politician and community activist
- Harpreet Singh (boxer) (born 1979), Indian boxer
- Harpreet Singh (carrom player), state carrom champion of Punjab, India
- Harpreet Singh (cricketer, born 1967) (born 1967), Indian cricketer
- Harpreet Singh (footballer, born 2002), Indian football player
- Harpreet Singh (sport shooter), Indian pistol shooter
- Harpreet Singh Bhatia (born 1991), Indian cricketer
- Harpreet Singh Giani, Indian Advocate and Barrister
- Harpreet Singh Nehal (born 1966), Singaporean lawyer and politician
