= Saarang =

Annual social and cultural festival of IIT Madras

- Genre: Cultural Festival
- Dates: January 11th–15th (2023)
- Location: Chennai, India
- Founded: 1974
- Attendance: 70,000+
- Organizer: Student community of IIT Madras
- Filing status: Student-run non-profit organization
- Website: saarang.org

Saarang (meaning 'Chital' or Spotted Deer in Sanskrit, a common sight on IIT Madras campus) is the annual social and cultural festival of IIT Madras. It is a 5-day long festival usually in the second week of the year. Founded in 1974, Saarang is the second oldest college festival in India. It was started in the name of 'Mardi Gras' with a small number of quizzes and music events. It adopted the name 'Saarang' and grew with the help of corporate sponsorship, collaboration with large-scale event organizers and international artists.

Saarang is a not-for-profit, entirely student-run, ISO 9001:2015 organization. All organizing members of the festival are current students of IIT Madras. 450 coordinators are organized as per function, in 12 departments, each headed by a 'core coordinator'. The 12 departments are led by the 2 cultural secretaries, who are elected by the institute annually in March.

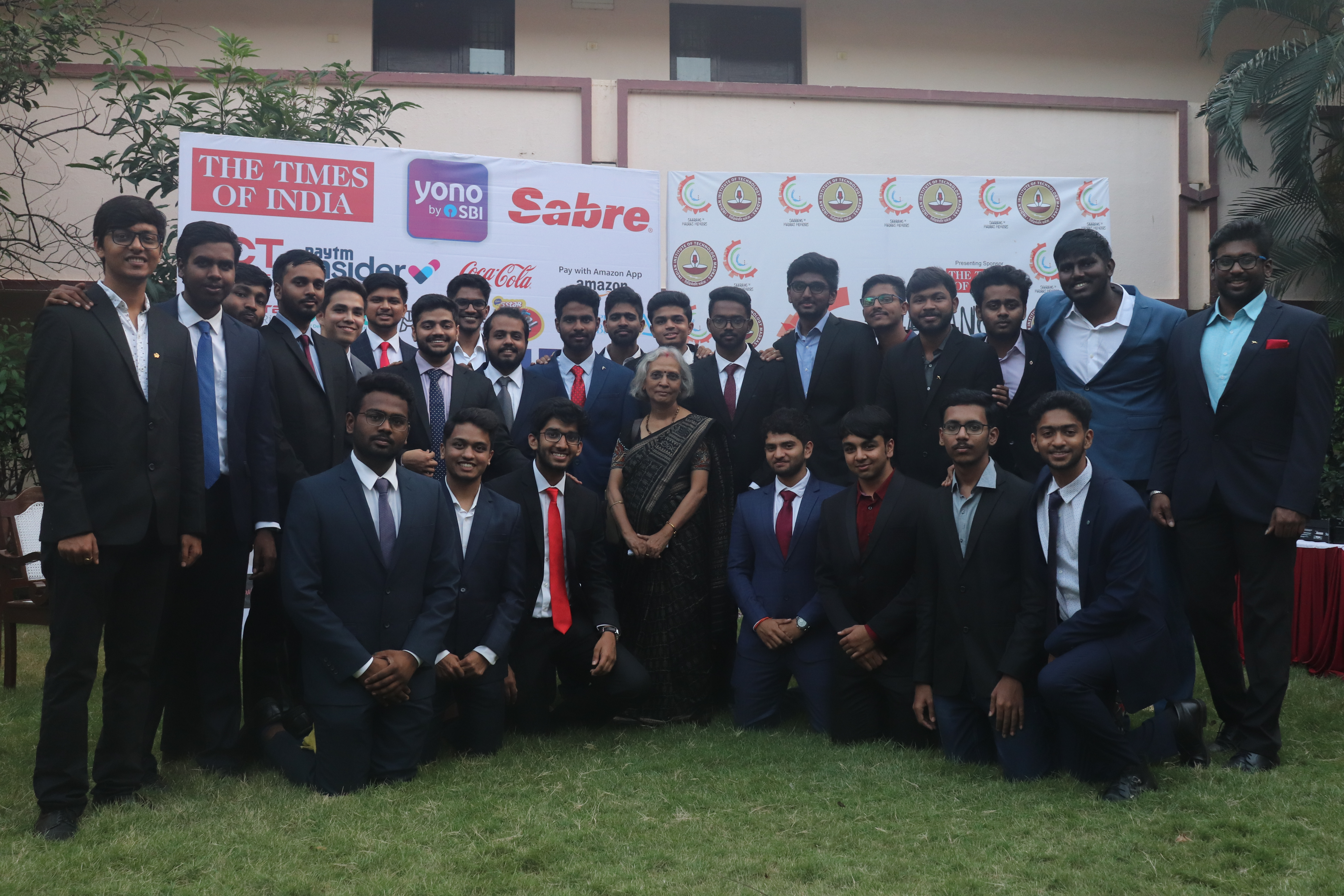
Saarang Core Team 2020

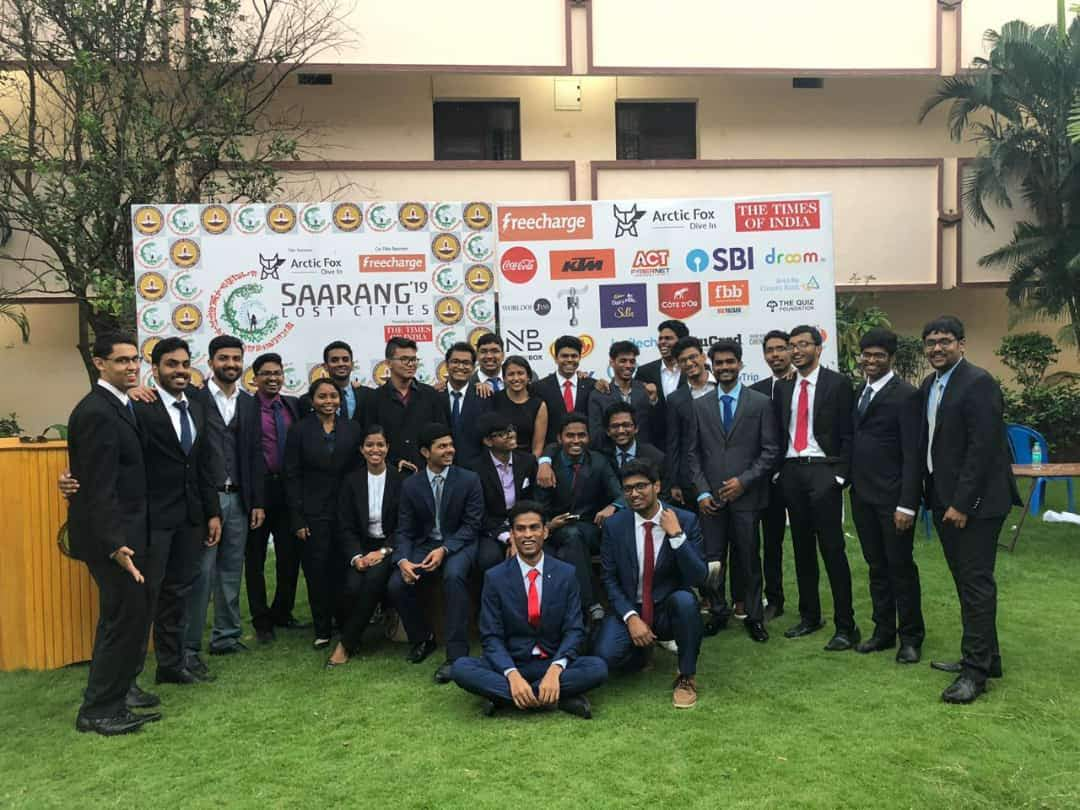
Saarang's Core Member Team, 2019

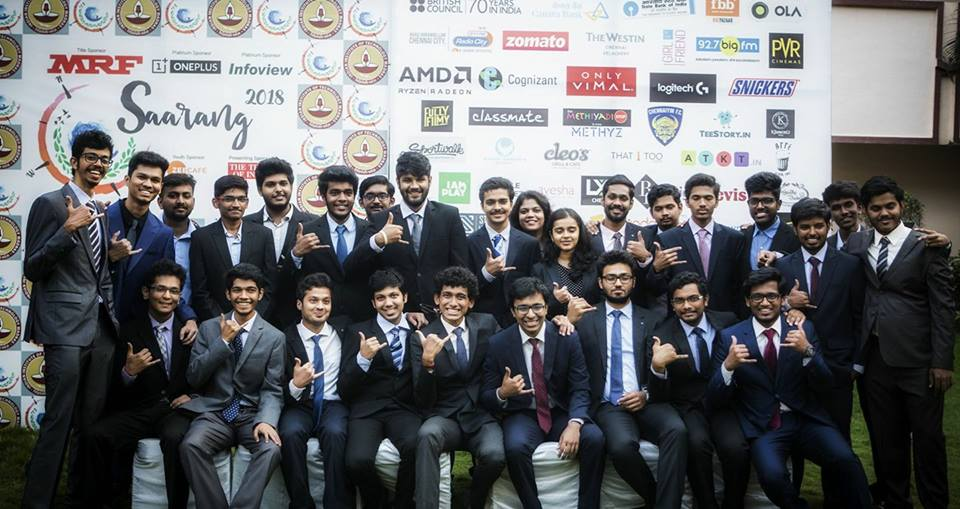
Saarang Core Member Team 2018

== History ==
In the early 1970s, a "cultural week" festival was held.

The fest was formally started in 1974–75 as Mardi Gras, the focus of the festival being to promote interest in cultural and literary activities and to develop the organizational skills of the students. The event was renamed to 'Saarang' in 1996 to give it a more 'Indian' theme. Commercial sponsorships for the event increased significantly in the late 90s.

== Events ==
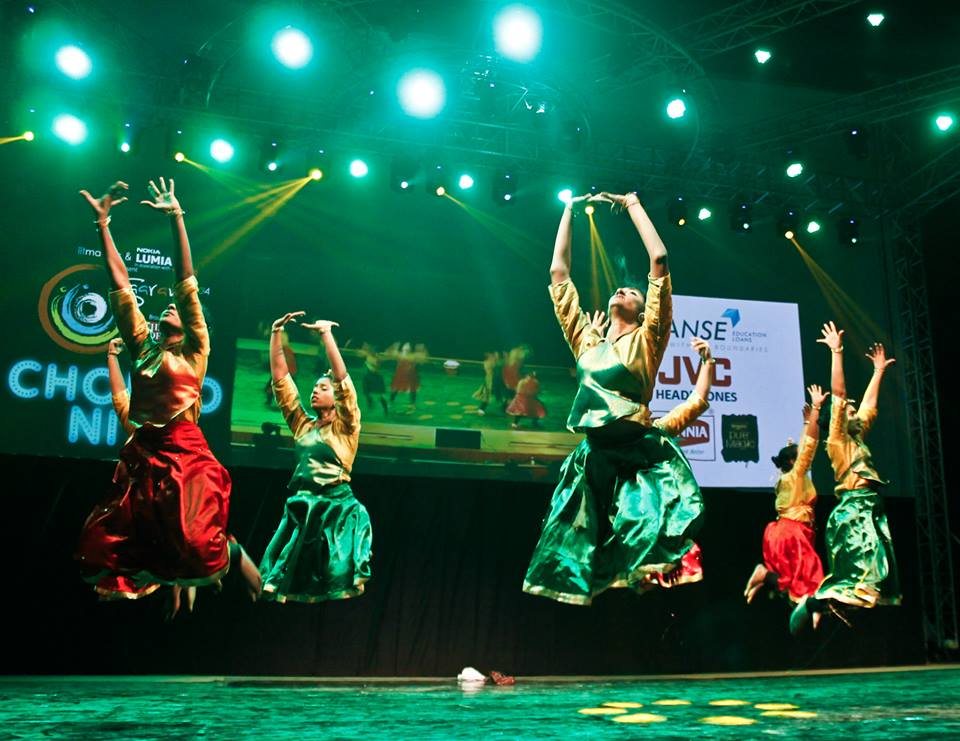
Students performing at a Choreo event

=== Spotlight (lectures and demonstrations) ===
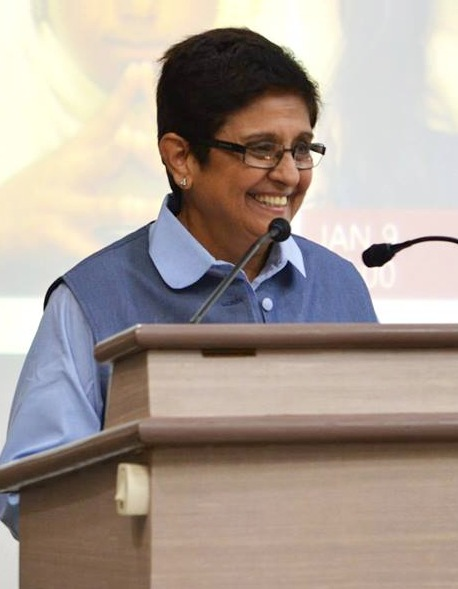
Kiran Bedi talks to students as part of Lectures and Demonstrations at Saarang, IIT Madras

Saarang has observed a wide range of personalities present lectures and conduct demonstrations during the event and as a part of Pre-Saarang activities. "Spotlight", a concept in the previous editions of Saarang was a platform for famous and notable persons from various fields to address the audience and hold interactive sessions with them. Past speakers featured in Saarang include Dr. Shashi Tharoor, Kamal Hassan, Shriya Saran, Manu Joseph, Nawazuddin Siddiqui, Mahesh Dattani, Leela Samson, Leander Paes, Kiran Bedi, Anita Rathnam, Ira Trivedi and R. Balakrishnan.

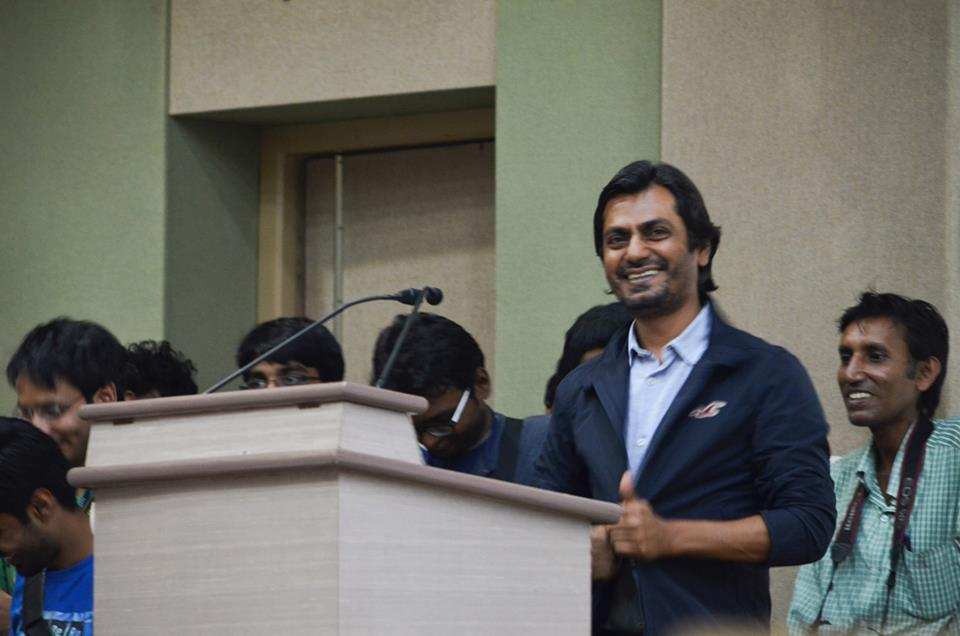
Nawazuddin Siddiqui at Saarang's Lectures and Demonstrations

=== Competitions ===
Competitive events are held throughout Saarang and registration begins in December through their website. There are events in every field of art, dance and music as well as literary events (Quizzing, Word Games, Oratory) and group events like Scavenger Hunt. They are hosted by the Sangam clubs of the institute. There are also informal stalls set up every day for spectators to participate in many small events.

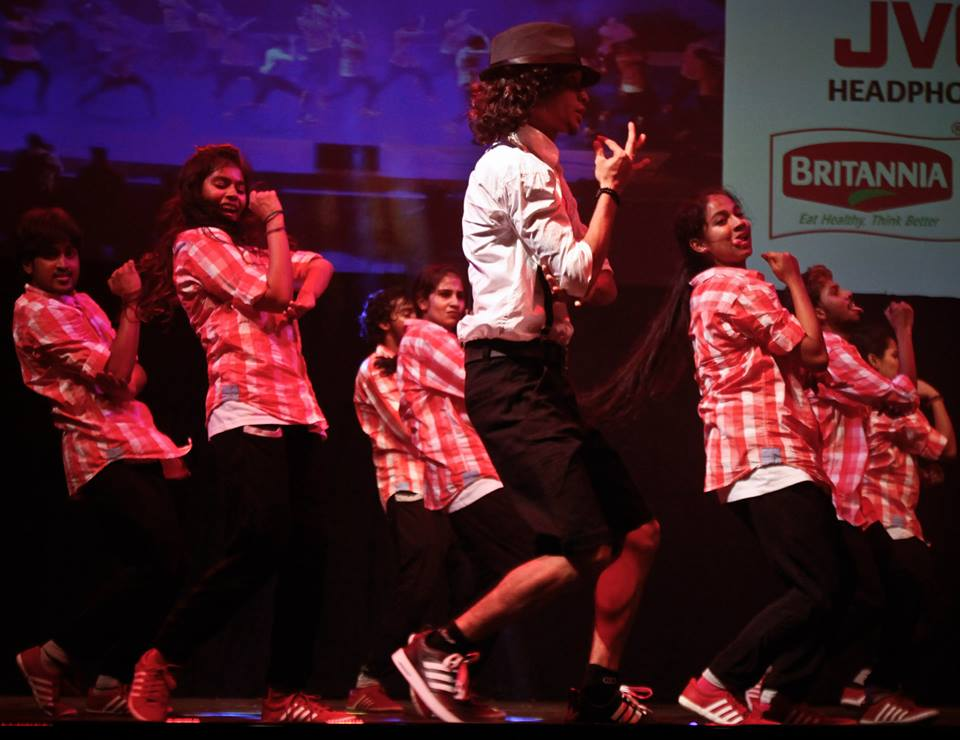
IIT students perform at Choreo Nite

=== World Fest Shows ===
The World Fest, previously known as "World Culture Show" (WCS), at Saarang is a platform to showcase culture and talent from around the world and hosts artists from various countries across the world. There have been many such performances at Saarang, in many kinds of music, like Irish folk, contemporary music, alternative rock, hip-hop and acoustic music. In the past, World Fest had introduced artists into Chennai's cultural scene through the contributions of Goethe-Institute/Max Mueller Bhavan, Alliance Française de Madras, the Philippine National Commission for Culture and the Arts, the Embassy of Israel, and the US Consulate in Chennai, among other international organizations, in support of their respective artistes.

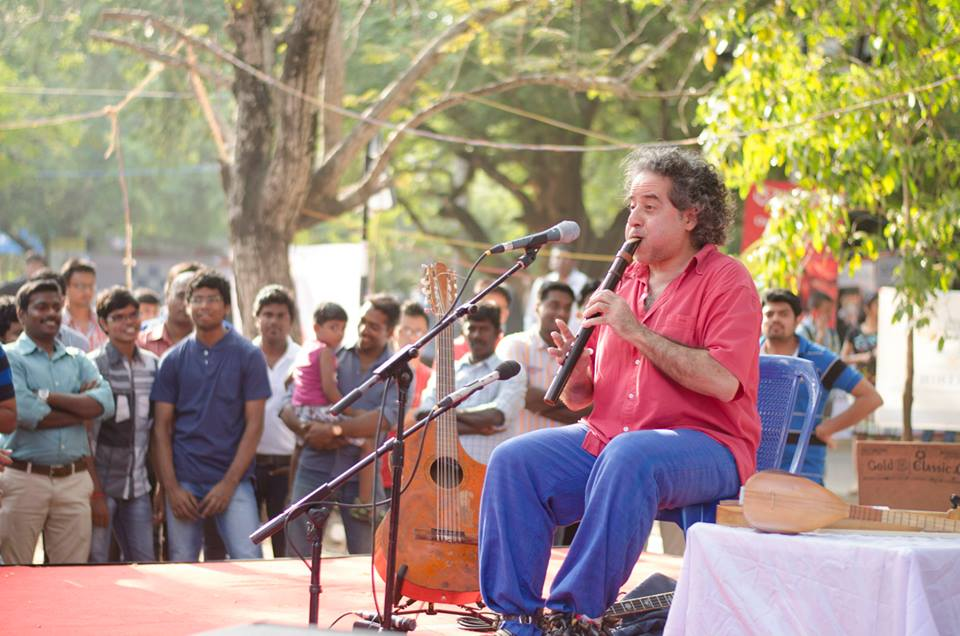
Abaji performs at the World Cultural Show in Saarang

=== Rock Show ===
At The Rock Show of Saarang, musicians of international bands of rock, alternative rock, metal and fusion have performed.

- 2003: Brahma (Headlining)
- 2004: Motherjane (Headlining),
- 2005: Orange Street (Headlining) Moksha (in 2005),
- 2006: Led Zepplica (Headlining), Parikrama
- 2007: Merzhin (Headlining), Mynta, Junkyard Groove
- 2008: Firebrands, Prestorika (in 2008)
- 2009: Opeth (Headlining)
- 2010: HammerFall (Headlining) and Hurricane Bells
- 2011: Pain of Salvation (Headlining),
- 2012: Vildhjarta (Headlining)
- 2013: Anathema (Headlining), Bevar Sea, Heretic
- 2014: Architects (Headlining), Grimus
- 2015: Karnivool(Headlining) preceded by Paradigm Shift.
- 2016: The Red Jumpsuit Apparatus
- 2017: Katatonia (Headliner), preceded Thaikkudam Bridge
- 2018: Veil Of Maya
- 2019: Parikrama (band), preceded by Local Train
- 2020: Motherjane, preceded by When Chai Met Toast
- 2022: Corner Cafe Chronicles
- 2023: Pineapple Express, preceded by Girish and the Chronicles
- 2024: Thaikkudam Bridge, preceded by RJD the Band
- 2025: Antariksh, preceded by Mysore Xpress
- 2026: Avial, preceded by Skrat
- 2027 will have Agam as the headliner

=== EDM Night ===
EDM Night is initiated in 2013. Brands like Sunburn and VH1 Supersonic have featured as its organizing partners. The line-up has featured popular artists in electronic dance music as well as a few international artists.

- 2013 - Sunburn Campus with DJ (S)haan and Dualist Inquiry.
- 2014 - Sunburn Campus with Dualist Inquiry, Nucleya, Anish Sood and Lost Stories.
- 2015 - VH1 Supersonic Campus with Thermal Projekt, Progressive Brothers and Nucleya.
- 2016 - DJs from Mars as international headliners. Sicklead, Aceaxe and Candice Redding as supporting acts.
- 2017 - Marnik as International headliner, Aceaxe & Sartek as Supporting Act
- 2018 - AronChupa as International headliner, Nina Suerte as Supporting Act
- 2019 - Maddix (DJ) as International headliner, Adrima as Supporting Act
- 2020 - DubVision as International headliner, Olly Esse as Supporting Act
- 2023 – Kaaze as international headliner, Krispie as supporting act.
- 2024 – Matisse & Sadko as international headliner, Holy C as supporting act.
- 2025 – Ritviz as headliner, Frozt as supporting act.
- 2026 – The EDM Night was rebranded as "Hip-Hop × EDM" for the first time since its inception, featuring Brodha V and Angemi as headliners, with Viola as supporting act.
- 2027 - EDM x Hip-Hop Night makes its return, with DJ Paroma and Chaar Diwaari as headliners.

=== Classical Night ===
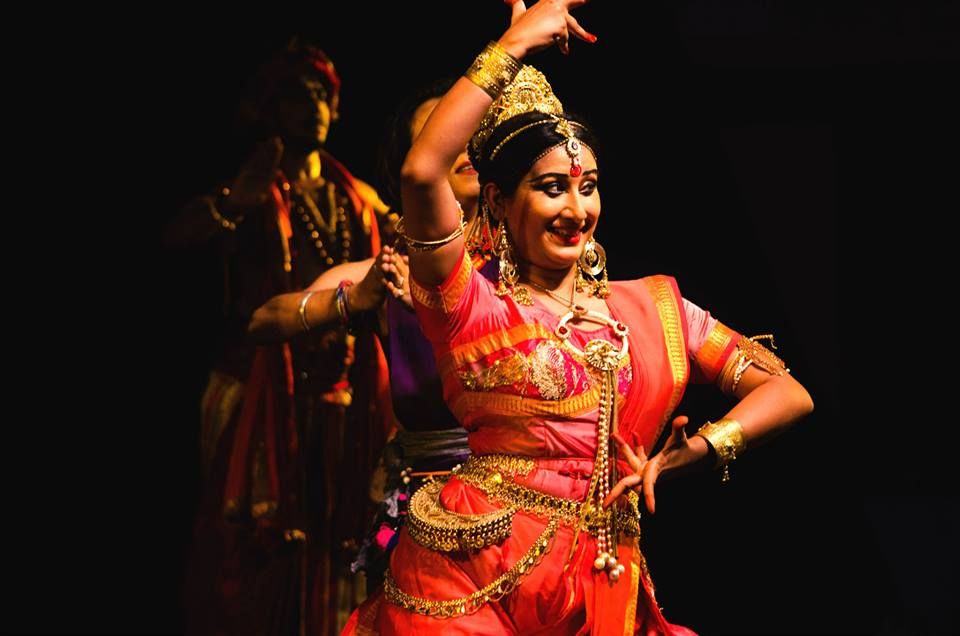
Sonal Mansingh performs at Classical Night

Every year Saarang starts with "Classical night" in the Open Air Theatre of IIT Madras. Reputed performers of Indian classical music and dance forms inaugurate Saarang at this professional show. M. Balamuralikrishna, Daksha Seth Dance Academy represented by Isha Sarvani, Mallika Sarabhai and troupe, Anil Srinivasan, Sikkil Gurucharan, Navin Iyer, Ganesh Kumaresh, S. Sowmya, B.S. Purushothaman, Sonal Mansingh, Aruna Sairam, Shobana have performed in the previous editions of Saarang.

=== Popular Night ===
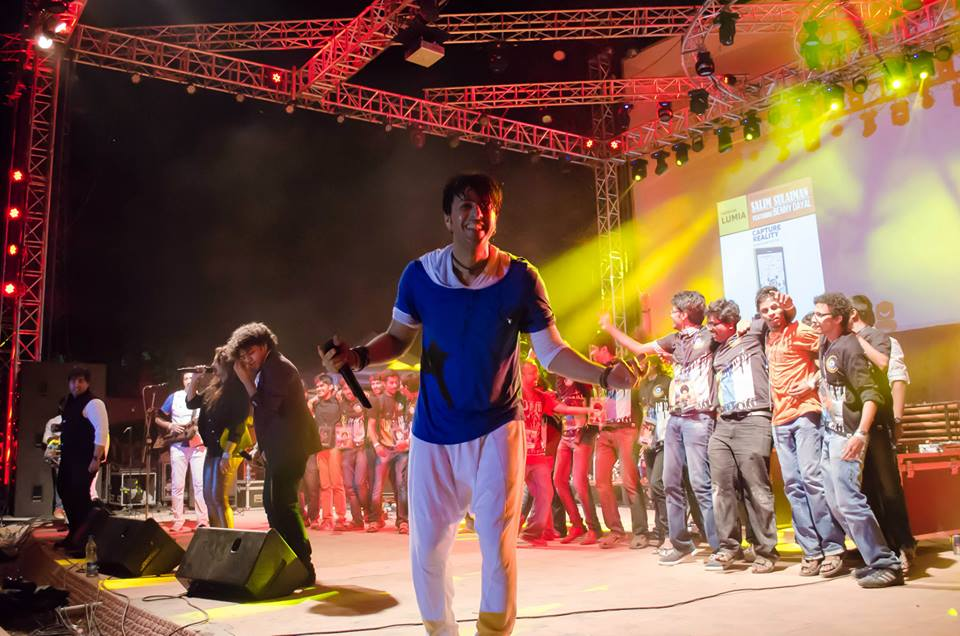
Salim -Sulaiman perform at Popular Night

Popular Night is hosted at the Open-Air Theatre of IIT Madras. It features live performances by members of the Kollywood and Bollywood music industry. Popular Night has featured artists like Devi Sri Prasad and Vishal& Shekhar (in the year 2012), Krishnakumar Kunnath, (in the year 2011), the musical trio Shankar, Ehsaan & Loy(in 2010) Sonu Nigam(in 2009), Lucky Ali and Karthik (in 2008), Sukhwinder Singh (in 2007), Shaan (in 2004)., Salim-Sulaiman, Benny Dayal (2019) and Shankar Mahadevan (2020).

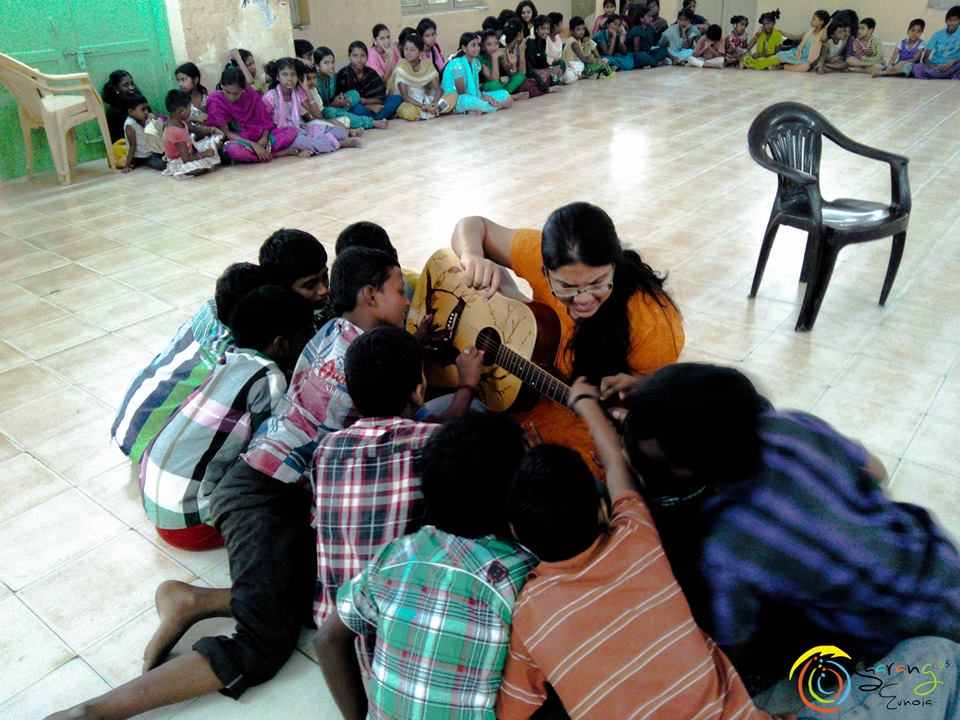
Workshop as part of Saarang Eunoia

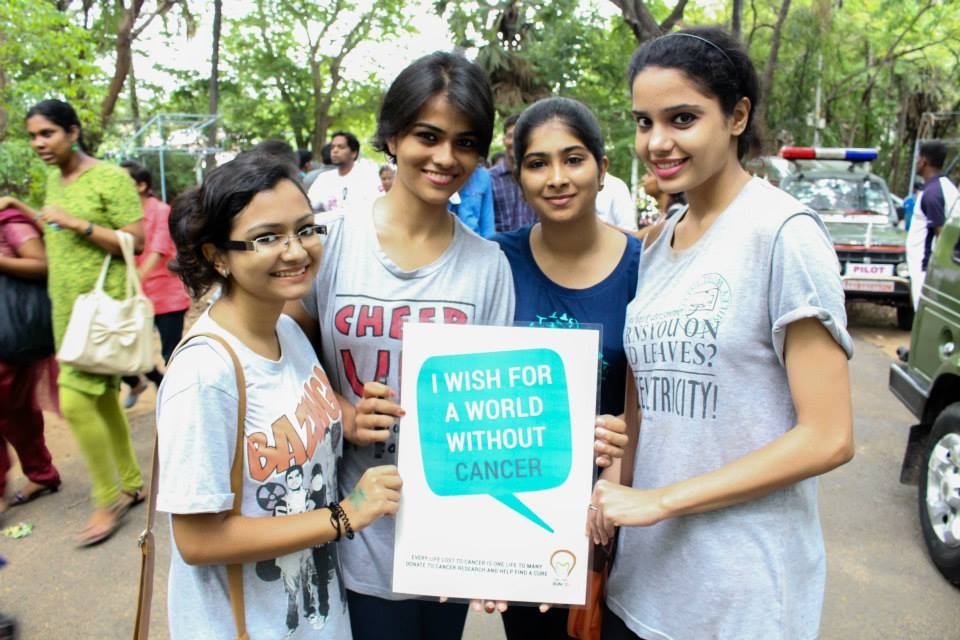
People at the Terry Fox run to raise cancer awareness at IIT Madras

== Social Campaign ==
Each year Saarang gives back to society in the form of initiatives taken as part of social campaigns. Saarang's past social campaigns have centered around community welfare in the form of water conservation, education, mental health, and health and hygiene awareness.

=== Panacea (2023) ===
Inspired by the Greek goddess of universal wellbeing, Panacea was the health and hygiene social campaign of Saarang 2023. The five major spheres under the campaign included, personal well-being, environmental hygiene, public health awareness, sanitation and sexual health. Initiatives such informative presentations, cyclathons, case competitions, educational text-based games, podcasts, and breast awareness campaigns, were used to spread awareness about keeping clean and healthy.

=== Mann & Mann 2.0 (2021 & 2022) ===
The years 2021 and 2022 hosted the social campaigns, Mann and its successor, Mann 2.0. Mann aimed to destigmatize the topic of mental health by bringing conversations on the topic to the forefront. Saarang collaborated with the MINDS foundation to conduct webinars for school children to encourage positive discussion normalizing the existence of mental illnesses and the need to provide professional help and support to those in need. With Mann Conversations, interactive conversations were held with mental health professionals and an educated perspective on the topic was streamed for thousands to see. The Mann website has multiple published articles about mental health issues, interactive quizzes on the topic and resources of mental health helplines, thereby acting as a steady source of support and guidance to those seeking mental help.

== Past associates and sponsors ==
Saarang has been sponsored by various established corporations. The main sponsor of Saarang for many years has been MRF Limited. Some of the other companies that have been sponsoring various events of Saarang are Max, Vodafone Essar, Bharti Airtel, Nokia, SBI, Exprez, Canara Bank, Derby, Wildcraft, Durex Jeans, Pepe Jeans, Aircel, Times of India, Freecharge, INOX, McDonald's, TATA Tion, isoft, Club Mahindra Holidays.
