= Thaikkudam Bridge =

Indian musical band

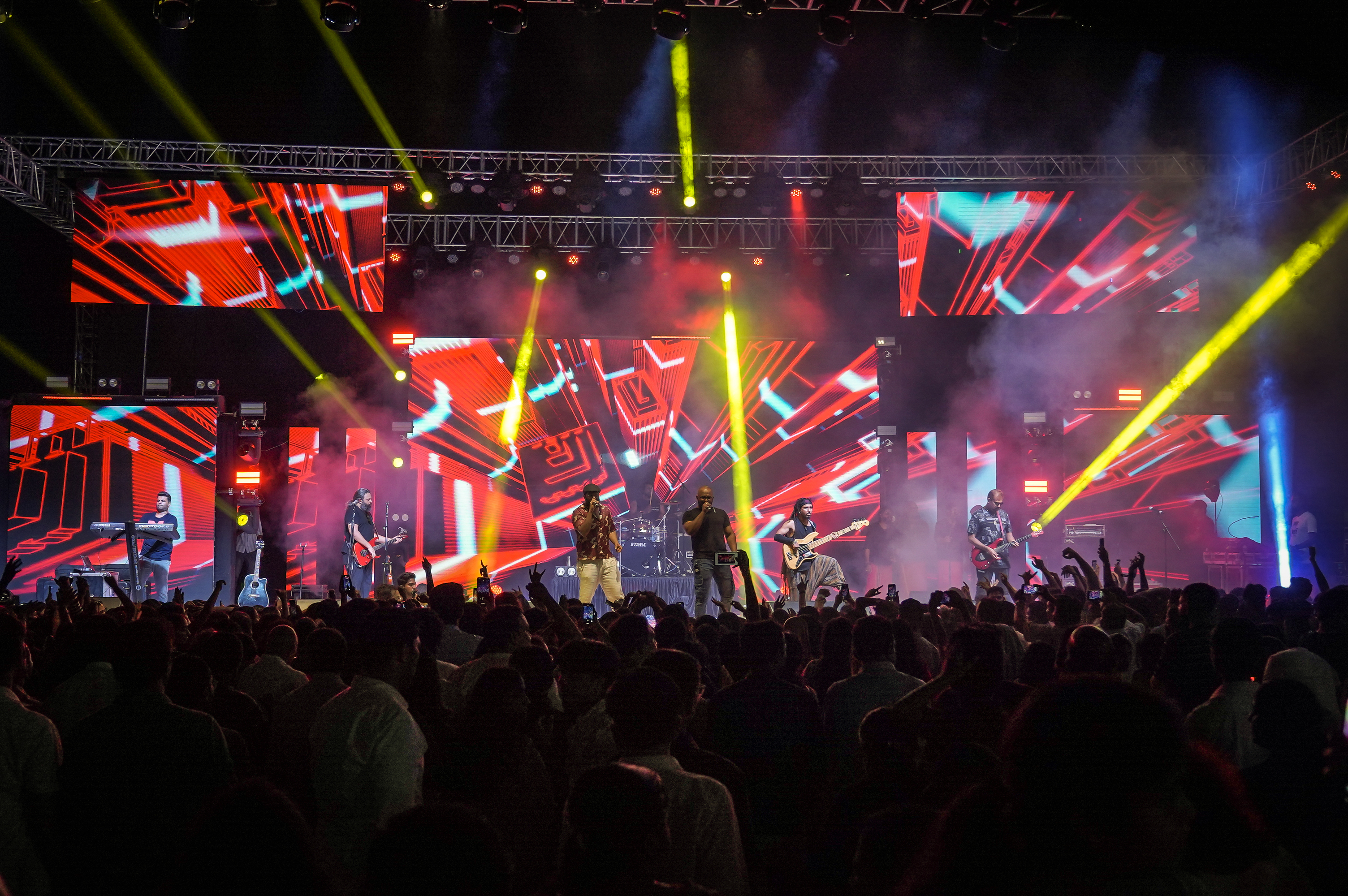
- Thaikkudam Bridge in 2022

Background information
- Origin: Kochi, Kerala, India
- Genres: Indian pop; Indian rock; heavy metal; folk; world
- Years active: 2013–present
- Labels: Wonderwall Media; Independent
- Members: Full list
- Past members: Siddharth Menon; Piyush Kapoor; Abin Thej
- Website: thaikkudambridge.com

Thaikkudam Bridge is a multi-genre Indian music band, formed in Kerala in 2013. It achieved its first commercial success through the musical show Music Mojo, which used to be telecast on Kappa TV where they released their debut original composition, "Fish Rock". The song is also popularly known by the lyrics "Ayela, mathi, choora, kaari...". The track went viral on social media, getting them extensive fame. The band has won numerous awards, and has performed in over 600 shows across 25 countries as of 2024.

== History ==
The band was conceived by Siddharth Menon and Govind Vasantha in 2013. The band's name, proposed by Piyush Kapoor (ex-member), is derived from a bridge located in Kochi, Kerala. Prior to forming Thaikkudam Bridge, the members had individual careers as musical artists. The members of the band Siddharth Menon and Vian Fernandes were part of a band.

Following the band's commercial breakthrough and increased demand for live shows, members put their individual careers on hold and focused on the Thaikkudam Bridge.

== Career ==
Formed in 2013, they began making songs with the music Television channel Kappa TV. Their first YouTube release was the cover for Michael Jackson's song "Beat It" which was performed by their former member Piyush Kapoor as a tribute on Michael Jackson's birthday. Later, along with Music Mojo, they released Nostalgia, featuring melodies of the popular 80s and 90s Malayalam movie songs "Mandara Cheppundo", "Panchakkarikkaaya Thattil", "Allimalarkavil", and "Chinkarakinnaram". The track Nostalgia first went viral on social media.

On 30 August 2013, their debut original composition, "Fish Rock," was released during the Kappa TV's "Music Mojo" session. The song is also popularly known by the lyrics "Ayela, mathi, choora, kaari...". The song gained significant popularity on social media, particularly on YouTube, which led to their first commercial success. They were soon invited to perform at colleges and major events.

Following the success, they released their debut studio album Navarasam in 2015, featuring nine songs, on various themes such as political satire, social inequality and historic stories from the Mughal era. It is a multi-lingual studio album where the songs are in Malayalam, Tamil and Hindi languages. The music videos for the tracks "Aarachar", "One", "Sulthan" and the title track "Navarasam" were released and became popular among audience. Before the release of their debut album, they released their first independent single "Chathe" after the Music Mojo sessions with Kappa TV. Later, it was included in the album Navarasam.

In 2015, the band composed the song "Theevandi" to the soundtrack of the film "Haram". This marked their debut in composing music for a feature film. Starring Fahadh Faasil, the film was released on 20 February 2015.

In 2017, the band's co-founder, Siddharth Menon, took a hiatus from the group. This was followed by an official announcement of his departure to pursue a solo career.

In March 2018, the band were invited to perform live at YouTube FanFest in Bangalore, an event featuring Indian YouTube creators hosted by YouTube, alongside Kappa TV.

Following the success of "Navarasam", the band's second studio album, "Namah", was released in 2019. Recording began in 2017. "Namah" is a concept album conceived as a tribute to the various artists who influenced the band's music. The album release coincided with the promotional concert from the band held at Forum Shantiniketan Mall in Bangalore.

In late 2019, the band received the "Most Popular Musical Band" Award at the Behindwoods Gold Mic Music Awards. The band also included a live tribute performance honour of A. R. Rahman.

The same year, they won the Best Band Award in the World Music Stage Category and Best Emerging Artiste at Summerfest.

== Controversy ==
The 2022, the Kannada movie Kantara has a track titled Varaha Roopam, which garnered a lot of publicity and popularity for its compelling music, visuals, and folk fusion. Social media users started noticing and pointing out this track had a resemblance to the 2017 title track from Navarasam.

Critics have referred to the musical and thematic similarities of the two tracks. Members of the band took notice as well, with one of the band members quoting:
"Initially, we were okay with it as some songs do have similarities at times. However, the comments, messages and calls didn't stop. In fact, thousands of comments were deleted on Varaha Roopam's video. We still gave it time, listened to it a number of times and made sure of the similarities."

They filed a copyright lawsuit against the makers of the film, Hombale Films, on the allegations of plagiarism against the song "Varaha Roopam". The band's management claimed that Varaha Roopam had infringed copyright laws by copying tracks from their debut album Navarasam. Later, the Kozhikode District court passed an injunction order against Hombale Films based on a suit filed by the band leading to prohibiting from playing its song Varaha Roopam in theaters, and on OTT and digital platforms.

== Band members ==
The band has 15 members consisting of musicians from various parts of India who contribute their own style and influences to the ensemble. Current

- Peethambaran Menon – vocals
- Govind Vasantha – vocals, violin
- Mithun Raju – lead guitar
- Anish TN – drums
- Ashok Betty Nelson – rhythm guitar
- Vian Fernandes – bass, vocals
- Ruthin Thej – keyboards
- Anish Krishna – vocals
- Krishna Bongane – vocals
- Nila Madhav Mohapatra – vocals
- Vipin Lal – vocals
- Christin Jose – vocals
- Amith Bal Kenath – sound engineering
- Rajan K.S – sound engineering
- Hemanth K – sound engineering

Past

- Siddharth Menon – vocals
- Piyush Kapoor – drums
- Abin Thej – keyboards

== Discography ==
=== Albums ===
Title	Year
Navarasam	2015
Namah	2019

=== Singles ===
Title	Year	Featuring
Giddh	2023	
Mazhaye	2022	Govind Vasantha
Hello 2021 (Tribute to A. R. Rahman)	2021	
Gokulam Kerala FC	2018	
Chathe	2015	
Theevandi (from Haram)	2015	
Fish Rock	2013	

== Major performances ==
They have performed live in over 25 countries, having played more than 600 shows as of 2024.

Event name	Year	City	Ref
Mahindra Independence Rock Festival	2022	Mumbai	
Summerfest	2023	Milwaukee	
Echoes of Earth	2023	Bangalore	
Saarang, IIT Madras	Various	Chennai	
Indiegaga	Various	Various	
Royal Enfield Rider Mania	2022	Goa	
South Side Stories	Various	Various	
Summerfest	2019	Milwaukee	
Kasauli Rhythm and Blues Festival	2019	Kasauli	
Visakha Utsav	2018	Visakhapatnam	
Mojo Rising by Kappa TV	2018	Kochi	
Pearl	2016	Hyderabad	
Red Bull Tour Bus	2016	Chennai	
NH7 Weekender	Various	Various	
