= Namah (Thaikkudam Bridge album) =

2019 studio album by Thaikkudam Bridge

Studio album by Thaikkudam Bridge
- Released: 30 November 2019
- Recorded: March 2017 – September 2019
- Studios: Rajiv Menon Studio (Chennai); K7 Studios (Kochi); NHQ Studio (Kochi)
- Genres: R&B; rock; pop; EDM; Indian folk; Hindustani classical; heavy metal; trance music; jazz
- Length: 1:08:53
- Languages: Malayalam; Tamil; Hindi; English
- Producer: Thaikkudam Bridge

Thaikkudam Bridge chronology
Navarasam (2017)	Namah (2019)

Singles from Namah
- 1. "Inside My Head" Released: 27 October 2017; 2. "Saalaikal" Released: 9 February 2018; 3. "Kanne" Released: 11 March 2020

Namah (transl. Salutations) is a 2019 studio album produced by the band Thaikkudam Bridge. Following the success of their studio album Navarasam, the band started working on the album during March 2017, and was officially revealed to the public and the media in August 2017. The album is considered as a "tribute to various renowned artists that influenced and inspired their music and made them who they are today". It was considered as the band's "most ambitious project" and had planned to rope international and national musical artists who were renowned for their works in the Indian and world music. The process made the team to delay the prospects of the album until they completed recording and compiling the entire album within September 2019.

Before the official album launch on 30 November 2019, Thaikkudam Bridge unveiled two songs as singles to have a glimpse for the album. The first being titled "Inside My Head", whose music video was uploaded by the band in October 2017 and another track titled "Saalaikal" was performed live by the band at a concert held in Bangalore in February 2018. The album release was coincided with the promotional concert from the band held at Forum Shantiniketan Mall in Bangalore and was simultaneously released in various music platforms for streaming and digital download.

== Creation ==
According to Mithun Raju, the lead guitarist, Namah translates to 'salutation' in English language, saying that "the album marks as an inspiration to all the 'great' musicians". It was touted to be the ambitious and the biggest projects of Thaikkudam Bridge; the album featured different genres bridging from Indian folk music to Hindustani classical, fused with rock, pop, rhythm and blues, electronic dance music, heavy metal, trance music and jazz music and had songs featuring in multiple languages: Malayalam, Tamil, Hindi, English, also with an inclusion of an instrumental track, similar to the band's previous studio album Navarasam. Mithun said that "We have stuck with the band's identity — the multi-lingual and multi-genre aspect, apart from the two or three heavy tracks". Eventually, the album features renowned musical artists from across the country and the world, featuring sitar artist Niladri Kumar, Hindustani vocalist Rashid Khan, Mohanveena exponent and Grammy Award-winner Pandit Vishwa Mohan Bhatt and renowned German-musician and multi-instrumentalist Marco Minnemann. All the artistes agreed to be part of the project after listening the tracks from their first album, Navarasam and other works from the band. The band decided to continue production of the album, especially on the basis of crowdfunding, to meet the enormous production cost.

== Composition ==
In March 2017, Thaikkudam Bridge started working on the album by composing for three of the tracks in the album. They finished one of the tracks titled "Kaliyankaattu Neeli" which had Pandit Vishwa Mohan Bhatt, playing mohan veena. The song had gone through 16 takes to be perfect. Later, another song from the album featuring Rashid Khan (which was later deciphered as "Jeele Jebhar"), was recorded within 15 minutes. All the tracks were recorded within the short-span of the time, but the production of the album was delayed as the band wanted to collaborate with more notable artists across the world, deferring its launch in September. Later, Govind Vasantha scored for three films during the album's production: Asuravadham, Solo and 96, and after the success of the latter, Govind decided to concentrate on film music.

Ashok Nelsan, the band's member met Jordan Rudess, lead keyboardist from the Dream Theater band when he was in Ratmalana Airport. In the progress, Rudess played the keyboard for one of the tracks named "Saalaikal", which speaks of harmony and friendship. Another track titled "Thekkiri" was recorded during mid-April 2018 and featured drummer Chris Adler, and mridangam artist Umayalpuram K. Sivaraman. It is considered to be a heavy-beat track that has a peculiar blend of mridangam and drums. Nelson said that "It ended up becoming the closing track on the album, but it remains eerie and heavy, Adler amping up on double-bass drumming while Sivaraman's mridangam portions coming in the second half of the track, almost apocalyptic in its intent, if Carnatic music ever could be that."

In February 2019, Anandraj Benjamin Paul, lead vocalist from the band Avial recorded the track titled "Kanne" during February 2019. It is about a father-daughter bond, how he promises to take care of her and raise her without any hatred. Govind tried to keep in-touch with Anand through social media, though he stepped back initially, he later agreed, as being a family-man, he was emotionally attached with the song. Anand had practised several times a day for nearly a month because he wanted to ensure that the result did not disappoint. A listening session of the album was conducted by the band through virtual media at Palarivattom on 28 November 2019, two days before the official launch.

== Track listing ==
All music is composed by Thaikkudam Bridge.

No.	Title	Lyrics	Performer(s)	Length
1.	"Saawariya"	Kenny, Santosh Bote	Thaikkudam Bridge, Pt. Ram Narayan	7:33
2.	"Kanne"	Dhanya Suresh	Thaikkudam Bridge, Anandraj Benjamin Paul	4:55
3.	"Saalaikal"	Ganesh Kumar Krish	Thaikkudam Bridge, Jordan Rudess	6:25
4.	"Inside My Head"	Ashok Nelson	Thaikkudam Bridge, Anish Krishnan, Marco Minnemann	7:01
5.	"Kaadum Malayum"	Dhanya Suresh	Thaikkudam Bridge, Rakesh Chaurasia	5:52
6.	"Nee"	Karthik Netha	Thaikkudam Bridge, Niladri Kumar	6:57
7.	"Jeele Jeebhar"	Sandeep S. Patil	Thaikkudam Bridge, Rashid Khan	8:15
8.	"I Can See You"	Ranjini Achuthan	Thaikkudam Bridge, Guthrie Govan	6:35
9.	"Kalliyankatt Neeli"	Dhanya Suresh	Thaikkudam Bridge, Pt. Vishwa Mohan Bhatt	6:00
10.	"Thekkini"	—	Thaikkudam Bridge, Chris Adler, Umayalpuram K. Sivaraman	9:20
Total length:				1:08:53

== Marketing and release ==
The album was first revealed to the public and media by Thaikkudam Bridge in June 2017 to The New Indian Express-based subsidiary publication IndulgeXpress, with the band briefly describing about the album and the prospects. A teaser for the album was unveiled during August, and the band had planned to release the album during mid-September but was deferred as the band's frontrunner and composer Govind Vasantha had said: "We planned to collaborate with worldwide artists as it is very important album to us. Also we had to promote the album in unique ways, but could not be achieved the cost we planned, so there is much delay in the production of the album". During the production of the album, the makers planned to release two music videos from the songs, based from the album — one of the tracks titled "Inside My Head" was performed by the band with Marco Minnemann handling the drums, released on 27 October 2017 through YouTube and digital platforms. Ashok Nelson said that "It is basically one mad man inviting others to the inside of his head. There are three men, a lot of chasing around, violence, blood, water and a beautiful forest, all appearing inside of a man's head. Thaikkudam Bridge released the music video of the track "Salaikal" on 9 February 2018 as the second song from the album.

The album was released at the Forum Shantiniketan Mall held in Whitefield, Bangalore on 30 November 2019. In addition to the album release, the team conducted a mini-concert for fans at the location and performed all the songs from the album at the venue. The songs were also made available in music streaming platforms such as Spotify, Gaana, JioSaavn, Apple Music, iTunes, Wynk, Hungama and Google Play Music for digital download and streaming.

== Live performance ==
Thaikkudam Bridge performed the song "Salaikal" live at the YouTube Fanfest showcase event held in Bangalore on 9 February 2018, and the music video was uploaded the same day. Initially, they planned to release the entire album during-June 2019 at the 51st edition of Summerfest, a 11-day music festival held at Wisconsin, United States, where they got the recognition of being the first Indian band to be performed at the event. However, it did not happen, the band performed the singles "Salaikal" and "Inside My Head" at the event. Despite the album launch in November, the band hosted a show at the Kochi Design Week, in Bolgatty Palace and Island Resort on 14 December 2019, to perform all the songs from the album. The band performed the album in their concert tour of 2020, which was halted in that March, due to COVID-19 pandemic lockdown in India being announced the same month. As a part of the concert tour in Kochi, the video song for "Kanne" was released on 11 March 2020 which was recorded in that concert. Eventually, it was reported that Thaikkudam Bridge had planned to shoot music videos for rest of the tracks in the album, and also planned to attend further international tours to perform the album live, but they could not do so, following lockdown and travel restrictions.

== Reception ==
Anurag Tagat of Rolling Stone India gave the album 4 out of 5 stars. Music critic Vipin Nair said that "Namah is a brilliant and efficient album from Thaikkudam Bridge and is worth the hype that we have waited for four long years" giving 3.5 out of 5 to the album; he listed "Kaliyankaattu Neeli", "Nee", "Saalaikal" and "Inside My Head" in their Music Aloud Playback – Best of 2019 in his review. Karthik Srinivasan of Milliblog said that "though it is less engaging, the album is a sprawling, ambitious effort with a lot of interesting collaborations. But that, perhaps forced them to think in a different direction for the album's overall sound. It is a highly listenable effort." He noted "Saalaikal" as "the most accessible track in the entire album along the four other tracks". Ramesh of Assorted Collections said "the guitar riffs with the progressive rock arrangements is a spellbinding listen".

== Personnel ==
Credits adapted from Thaikkudam Bridge official website

- Govind Vasantha – Vocalist, violin
- Mithun Raju – Lead guitar
- Ashok Nelson – Rhythm, bass guitar, sound engineer
- Vian Fernandes – Bass guitar, vocalist
- Ruthin Theij – Keyboards
- Anish T N – Drums
- Pt. Ram Narayan – Sarangi
- Niladri Kumar – Sitar
- Jordan Rudess – Keyboard
- Pt. Vishwa Mohan Bhatt – Mohan veena
- Rakesh Chaurasia – Flute
- Marco Minnemann – Drums
- Guthrie Govan – Acoustic guitar
- Chris Adler – Drums
- Umayalpuram K. Sivaraman – Mridangam
- Anandraj Benjamin Paul – Vocalist
- Rashid Khan – Vocalist
- Peethambaran Menon – Vocalist
- Vipin Lal – Vocalist, sound engineer
- Christin Jos – Vocalist, sound engineer
- Anish Gopalakrishnan – Vocalist
- Krishna Bongane – Vocalist
- Nila Madhab Mohapatra – Vocalist
- Amith Bal – Vocalist, mixing engineer
- Rajan K S – Vocalist, mixing engineer
- Hemanth Mukundan – Vocalist, mastering engineer
- Jayakrishnan Nalinkumar – Mastering engineer
- Frank Arkwright – Mastering engineer (Abbey Road Studios, London)
- Recorded at – Rajiv Menon Studio (Chennai), K7 Studio (Kochi), NHQ Studio (Kochi)
- Sujith Unnithan – Studio manager
