= Vaanam Kottattum =

2020 film by Dhana Sekaran

- Theatrical release poster
- Directed by: Dhana
- Screenplay by: Dhana; Mani Ratnam
- Story by: Mani Ratnam
- Produced by: Mani Ratnam
- Starring: R. Sarathkumar; Vikram Prabhu; Shanthanu Bhagyaraj; Radhika Sarathkumar; Aishwarya Rajesh; Madonna Sebastian
- Cinematography: Preetha Jayaraman
- Edited by: Sangathamizhan E.
- Music by: Songs: Sid Sriram; Score: Sid Sriram; K
- Production company: Madras Talkies
- Distributed by: YNOTX
- Release date: 7 February 2020
- Running time: 127 minutes
- Country: India
- Language: Tamil

Vaanam Kottattum (transl. Let it rain) is a 2020 Indian Tamil-language drama film directed by Dhana, who co-wrote the film with Mani Ratnam. The film has an ensemble cast of R. Sarathkumar, Vikram Prabhu, Shanthanu Bhagyaraj, Radhika Sarathkumar, Aishwarya Rajesh and Madonna Sebastian with an ensemble supporting cast. The film is produced by Mani Ratnam for Madras Talkies, with the latter also credited for co-writing the film's script. The film was released on 7 February 2020.

== Plot ==
As a young boy, Selva witnesses his paternal uncle Velusaamy Thevar being stabbed by someone. His father Bose Kaalai takes him to the hospital, where Bose kills two people who were responsible for his brother's condition. Bose's wife Chandra is shocked and wishes her son not to become like his father. She moves to Chennai with her son Selva and daughter Mangai.

Chandra struggles with adolescent Selva's stubborn attitude. Bose's elder brother Velusaamy supports his family. As adults, Selva works as a call taxi driver and Mangai is a law college student. They share a good friendship with Ramanathan. Selva drives a couple in his taxi and sees them fighting over their breakup. The girl threatens her lover to marry her or commit suicide by jumping from a bridge into a lake. Selva saves both the boy and the girl, rescuing them both.

Velusaamy asks Selva to accompany him to a wholesale plantain market to settle accounts with Paramasivan. He gets the due money back and starts a new business of plantain wholesale. They approach the victim's family to supply plantains, which they reluctantly agree to. Preetha's family is heavily indebted, and they approach Reddy, a big head in plantain wholesale, for supply of Andhra plantains. Reddy agrees to do business with them provided they secure a shop in the Koyambedu market. Mangai intelligently accomplishes the task, winning a place in the Koyembedu market and befriending Reddy's son Kalyan.

Meanwhile, Bose is released from prison after 16 years. Selva and Mangai feel bad about their father as he was in jail and this will affect the respect in the neighborhood. Chandra gets angry about her children's attitude and supports her husband. Bose interferes in Selva's business without his consent, which irritates Selva. The plantain supplier, who belongs to the family of the person killed by Bose, refuses to continue business with Selva as Bose returned from prison. Hence the supply for plantains stop. Bose disappears from home for three days with Chandra's jewels. Mangai and Selva think that he ran away with the jewels, but Bose returns bringing a truck of golden fruits (plantain variety) procured from Bangalore. Selva is irked by the golden fruits and supplies them free of cost as they may rot at any time. He gets angry that Bose wasted the money. This ensues a fight between Bose and Selva, and Bose angrily leaves home.

Bose also insults Preetha that she flirted with his son and made him give a bank guarantee for two crores. He misunderstands the relation between Mangai and Kalyan and warns him to stay away from his daughter. This angers Selva and Mangai, but they keep quiet for their mother. Selva finds that the variety of the golden fruit is in much demand and becomes delighted about the orders he gets. Reddy comes to Selva's home to ask Mangai's hand for marriage with his son, but Mangai declares that she loves her childhood friend Ramanathan. Reddy happily agrees to it and blesses her.

Meanwhile, Baskaran has been following Bose the moment he got released from jail. His twin brother Natrayan warns him to stay away from Bose's family as killing him is not a solution; rather, his future will get spoiled. Baskaran accidents Bose's bike, and Bose is injured and hospitalized. Selva sees Baskaran running away from the hospital and chases him but in vain. Meanwhile, George passes away. Selva consoles Preetha, and they start a relationship. Bose is heartbroken that his children do not accept him in their life and leaves to his brother's house. He finds the victim's family went to Chennai in search of him. Scared that they might harm his family, Bose rushes to Chennai. Baskaran tricks Selva posing as Natrayan and pretends to warn that he has come to save his family from Baskaran. Selva gets kidnapped by Baskaran. Bose arrives on time and rescues Selva. He tells Baskaran that jail is hell and that he should not waste his life killing Bose. If he still wants to take revenge, he can go ahead. Baskaran changes his mind and leaves them.

The film ends with Bose and Chandra celebrating their 60th anniversary in their hometown with the reconciled Selva, Mangai, and the entire family.

== Cast ==
- Sarathkumar as Bose Kaalai
- Vikram Prabhu as Selva, Bose Kaalai's son
  - Master Raghavan as Young Selva
- Shanthanu Bhagyaraj as Ramanathan
- Nandha in a dual role as:
  - Bhaskaran
  - Natrayan
- Radhika Sarathkumar as Chandra, Bose Kaalai's wife
- Aishwarya Rajesh as Mangai, Bose Kaalai's daughter
- Madonna Sebastian as Preetha George
- Amitash Pradhan as Kalyan Reddy
- Balaji Sakthivel as Velusaamy Thevar, Bose Kaalai's brother
- Madhusudhan Rao as Reddy
- Ram C as Prathap
- M. J. Shriram as George, Preetha's father
- Sreeja Ravi as Velumani, Ramanathan's mother
- "Murattu Pandian" Baboos as Paramasivan
- Supergood Subramani
- Aroul D. Shankar

== Production ==
Mani Ratnam finalised plans to produce a film for Madras Talkies by his assistant director Dhana Sekaran in late 2018. The story of the film was conceived by Mani Ratnam during a recce during the pre-production stages of O Kadhal Kanmani (2015). He had written a story based on the lives of real characters from Theni, which his assistant Dhana had recollected from his years growing up in the hill town. Mani Ratnam chose to eventually prioritise other directorial ventures, but agreed to produce the script with Dhana as director, owing to his familiarity with the characters. Dhana initially considered naming the film either Two Brothers or Brother Sister, but Mani Ratnam suggested the title of Vaanam Kottattum, a title he had earlier considered for his O Kadhal Kanmani and Kaatru Veliyidai (2017).

The first crew member to be publicly announced was music composer Govind Vasantha, who accepted to work on the film following negotiations in early November 2018. G. V. Prakash Kumar was signed to play the lead role, while Aishwarya Rajesh joined the cast shortly after to play the sister of Prakash Kumar's character. Vikram Prabhu replaced Prakash Kumar during March 2019, while Madonna Sebastian was subsequently cast opposite him. Actors Sarathkumar and Radhika Sarathkumar were then drafted in to play the parents of Vikram Prabhu's character.

Prior to the start of the shoot, actors Nandha Durairaj, Shanthanu Bhagyaraj and Amitash Pradhan were also added to the cast. Director Balaji Sakthivel joined the film's cast in August 2019 to portray a supporting role, marking an extended foray into acting following his role in Asuran (2019). Preetha Jayaraman was signed as the film's cinematographer, while Eka Lakhani joined as the costume designer. Despite finishing work on two songs, Govind Vasantha opted out of the film owing to a production delay and was replaced by playback singer Sid Sriram, who made his debut as a music composer through the project.

The film began production on 19 July 2019 and was continued throughout August. Scenes and a montage song titled "Business" featuring Vikram Prabhu was filmed near Jerusalem College of Engineering, Chennai. Further scenes were filmed at home in Triplicane, with Mani Ratnam also often visiting the shoot. During the first look poster release, the rest of the technicians working on the film was revealed, including K. Kathir as art director, debutant Sangathamizhan E. as film editor, Viji Sathish as choreographer, and "Stunner" Sam as stunt choreographer.

== Music ==
Vaanam Kottattum

Soundtrack album by Sid Sriram
- Released: 23 January 2020
- Recorded: 2019
- Studios: AM Studios, Chennai; 20dB Studios, Chennai; Krimson Avenue Studios, Chennai
- Genre: Feature film soundtrack
- Length: 21:14
- Language: Tamil
- Label: Sony Music
- Producer: Navneeth Balachandran

Singles from Vaanam Kottattum
- 1. "Kannu Thangom" Released: 15 November 2019; 2. "Easy Come Easy Go" Released: 20 November 2019; 3. "Poova Thalaiyaa" Released: 15 January 2020; 4. "En Uyir Kaatre" Released: 20 January 2020

The music for the film was composed by singer Sid Sriram, making his debut as a film composer. In addition to him singing most of the songs in this movie (except for the song, "Mannava"), he also composed the film's background score, alongside music director K. The album features six songs (with four of them were previously being released as singles), in which the lyrics for all the songs are written by Siva Ananth.

The first single track, "Kannu Thangom" was released on 15 November 2019. The second single track, "Easy Come Easy Go" was released on 20 November 2019. The third single track, "Poova Thalaiyaa" was released on 15 January 2020, coinciding with Pongal celebration. The fourth single track, "En Uyir Kaatre" was released on 20 January 2020.

The film's album was released at the music and trailer launch event which held on 23 January 2020. In addition, the album was made available immediately through music streaming platforms.

Govind Vasantha was signed in to compose music for the film. However, despite finishing work on two songs, Govind Vasantha opted out of the film owing to a production delay and was replaced by Sid Sriram, who made his debut as a music composer through the project.

| No. | Title | Singer(s) | Length |
|---|---|---|---|
| 1. | "Kannu Thangom" | Sid Sriram, Shakthisree Gopalan | 3:27 |
| 2. | "Easy Come Easy Go" | Sid Sriram, Sanjeev Thomas, MADM, Tapass Naresh | 3:50 |
| 3. | "Poova Thalaiyaa" | Anthony Daasan, Sid Sriram | 3:09 |
| 4. | "En Uyir Kaatre" | Sid Sriram | 4:14 |
| 5. | "Mannava" | Shakthisree Gopalan | 3:04 |
| 6. | "Thinam Thinam" | Sid Sriram | 3:30 |
| Total length: | | | 21:14 |

== Release ==
YNOTX was announced as the film's distribution partner on 6 January 2020. The film was originally scheduled to be released on 31 January 2020, was released on 7 February 2020.

== Critical reception ==
A critic from Dinamalar rated the film 3.25/5. M. Suganth of The Times of India rated the film 3/5 stars and wrote, "While the characters that Dhana and Mani Ratnam have created are certainly interesting, the plotting isn't as effective. Even if there are no dull moments, the leisurely pacing does make the film feel longer than its slightly over two-hour duration."

Sudhir Suryawanshi of The New Indian Express wrote, "This is such a great premise. [...] If you will allow me the conceit of employing the metaphor of this film’s title, I’d say that the premise deserved an emotionally affecting downpour. What we get though is a deficient drizzle." Sreedhar Pillai of Firstpost gave the film 3/5 stars and wrote, "It moves at such a leisurely pace, that the 124 minutes film feels too long and stretched. [...] In the end, Vaanam Kottatum is a decent family film that has its moments, though far and few and is more of a drizzle than the skies opening up."

Anjana Shekar of The News Minute wrote, "Vaanam Kottatum is all about family and relationships and while the story is nothing new, it's elevated by the actors who deliver great performances." Srivatsan S. of The Hindu wrote, "Despite its flaws, Director Dhana Sekaran has excelled by pulling off a great casting coup, that makes even the slightest of scenes look great".

S. Subhakeerthana of The Indian Express rated the film 2.5/5 stars and wrote, "Vaanam Kottattum has excellent bits of writing, but as a whole, it is not consistent." Janani K. of India Today wrote, "Director Dhana Sekaran's Vaanam Kottatum is a family drama with an age-old revenge saga at the centre. Apart from incredible performances, the film doesn't hold your attention."
