= Siddharth Menon (singer) =

Indian singer (born 1989)

- Born: 1 July 1989 (age 37); Mumbai, Maharashtra, India
- Occupations: Singer; actor
- Years active: 2012–present
- Spouse: Tanvi Palav

Siddharth Menon (born 1 July 1989) is an Indian playback singer and actor. He is a founder and former vocalist of the band Thaikkudam Bridge.

== Career ==
Menon founded the band Thaikkudam Bridge with Govind Vasantha in 2013. He left the band to pursue a solo career in February 2017.

He made his playback‑singing debut with the song "Tharangal" in the 2013 film North 24 Kaatham.

He also founded the Siddharth Menon Live Music Band, which has been active for over 12 years — a platform for his solo career and live performances.

== Personal life ==
He married Marathi actress Tanvi Palav on 22 December 2019.

== Awards ==
Year	Award	Category	Movie	Outcome	Ref(s)
2016	SIIMA Awards	Best Male Debut	Rockstar	Won	
