= Rathi Arumugam =

Indian actress

Rathi
- Born: Rathi Arumugam; 23 September 1982 (age 44); Bangalore, Karnataka, India
- Occupation: Actress
- Years active: 2002–2006; 2011-2021

Rathi is an Indian former actress, who appeared mostly in Tamil cinema and Telugu cinema.

== Early life ==
Rathi was born in Bangalore, Karnataka to Tamil people Arumugam and Bharani. She has two siblings, one elder sister and one younger brother. She was a student of dentistry at the Mathrushri Ramabai Ambedkar Dental College and Hospital in Bangalore. She is a trained classical dancer and had her Arangetram.

== Career ==
She made her acting debut in the 2002 Tamil film Gummalam. She starred opposite Cheran in Thangar Bachan's Solla Marandha Kadhai. She appeared in a couple more Tamil films, including Adi Thadi starring Sathyaraj, but none of them were commercially successful. She had also performed an item number in the Tamil film Anjaneya featuring Ajith Kumar in the lead role. She then migrated to Telugu cinema and acted in six films.

Between her careers in both film and television, she also managed to complete a bachelor's degree in genetics.

== Public appearances ==
In 2003, Rathi created a sensation when she appeared on stage as a special guest in the 'Euphoria 03' event at the PSG College of Arts and Science.

== Filmography ==
Year	Film	Role	Language	Notes
2002	Enge Enadhu Kavithai	Kavitha	Tamil	
2002	Solla Marandha Kadhai	Parvathi Chokkalingam	Tamil	Nominated- Filmfare Award for Best Tamil Actress
2002	Gummalam	Anu	Tamil	
2003	Pallavan	Meenakshi, Reena	Tamil	
2003	Anjaneya		Tamil	Special appearance
2003	Anbe Un Vasam	Bharathi	Tamil	
2003	Knock Knock, I'm Looking to Marry	Nithya	English	
2004	Kerala House Udan Vilpanakku	Sundari	Malayalam	
2004	Adi Thadi	Priya	Tamil	
2004	Singara Chennai	Bhuvana	Tamil	
2004	Pallakilo Pellikoothuru	Rani	Telugu	
2005	Sankranthi	Kaveri	Telugu	
2005	Ayodhya	Sasirekha aka Shotput	Telugu	
2005	Boyfriend		Kannada	
2005	Allari Bullodu	Usha	Telugu	
2005	Moguds Pellams	Padmavathi	Telugu	
2006	Asadhyudu		Telugu	Special appearance
2006	Prema Sangamam		Telugu	

=== Voice artist ===
- Genelia D'Souza – Boys (2003)
- Diya – Kodambakkam (2006)

== Television ==
Year	Serial	Channel	Language	Notes
2011–2012	Shanthi Nilayam	Jaya TV	Tamil	
2013–2015	Bangara	Udaya TV	Kannada	Remake of Thangam (TV series)
2013	Chithiram Pesuthadi	Jaya TV	Tamil	Replaced by Priyanka
2013	Godha Kalyanam	ETV	Telugu	
2021	Rudramadevi	Star Maa	Telugu	
