= Preetha Jayaraman =

Indian cinematographer

- Occupation: Cinematographer
- Years active: 2003–present
- Relatives: P. C. Sreeram (uncle)

Preetha Jayaraman is an Indian cinematographer. She is the niece of famous cinematographer P. C. Sreeram. Jayaraman is a gold medallist from the Film and Television Institute in Chennai and holds a Master's degree from Bond University, Australia. She is one of the first four women to be inducted into the Indian Society of Cinematographers. She is also a member of the South Indian Cinematographer's Association (SICA) and the Indian Women's Cinematographer's Collective (IWCC).

== Early life and education ==
Jayaraman earned a gold medal from the Film and Television Institute (FTI) in Chennai. She began her career at age 18 as an assistant to P. C. Sreeram, working with him for five years before pursuing further education. She later completed a Master's degree in Film and Television from Bond University in Australia (2000-2001), during which she received an internship with Warner Brothers during the production of Scooby-Doo (2002).

== Career ==
After completing her master's degree, Jayaraman returned to India and shot her first feature film, Knock Knock, I'm Looking to Marry (2003), in English. She came to prominence with her work on Abhiyum Naanum (2008), a Tamil family drama directed by Radha Mohan and produced by Prakash Raj. The film was awarded Best Film by the Tamil Nadu state government for the year 2008. Jayaraman has worked extensively across multiple Indian film industries, shooting features in Tamil, Telugu, Kannada, Hindi, Malayalam, and English. She frequently collaborates with actor-director Prakash Raj, having worked on his trilingual film Un Samayal Arayil (2014), also released as Ulavacharu Biryani in Telugu and Oggarane in Kannada. She later shot Raj's Hindi directorial debut Tadka (2022). Her notable works include Vaanam Kottatum (2020), produced by Madras Talkies, Hey Sinamika (2022) in Tamil, and Dhoomam (2023) in Malayalam. In 2025, she worked as one of three cinematographers on the coming-of-age drama Bad Girl, directed by Varsha Bharath, which premiered at the International Film Festival Rotterdam. Beyond feature films, Jayaraman has extensive experience shooting television commercials, music videos, short films, and documentaries. Her commercial work includes campaigns for major brands such as ICICI Bank, Britannia, Titan, and Apple. She shot the music video "Teri Deewani" (2007) for singer Kailash Kher.

== Filmography ==
Year	Title	Language	Notes
2003	Knock Knock, I'm Looking to Marry	English	
2007	Kannamoochi Yenada	Tamil	
2008	Abhiyum Naanum	Tamil	
2009	Aakasamantha	Telugu	
2011	Aidondla Aidu	Kannada	1 of 5 cinematographers
2013	Gouravam	Tamil; Telugu	
2014	Ulavacharu Biryani; Un Samayal Arayil; Oggarane	Telugu; Tamil; Kannada	
2015	Boxer	Kannada	
2019	The Fakir of Venice	Hindi	
2019	Aadi Lakshmi Puraana	Kannada	
2020	Vaanam Kottatum	Tamil	
2021	Hey Sinamika	Tamil	
2021	Badava Rascal	Kannada	
2022	Tadka	Hindi	
2023	Dhoomam	Malayalam	
2023	Baanadariyalli	Kannada	Story writer
2025	Bad Girl	Tamil	Cinematography alongside Jagadeesh Ravi and Prince Anderson
2026	John Doe	Tamil	

== Awards and recognition ==
Year	Award	Category	Film	Result
2019	Karnataka State Award	Excellence in Cinematography		Won
2019	Wonder Women Awards	Best Cinematography		Won
2020	Inspirational Global Woman Award	Cinematography		Won
2021	JFW Movie Awards	Best Cinematographer	Vaanam Kottatum	Won
