= 90 ML (2019 Tamil film) =

2019 film directed by Anita Udeep

- Theatrical release poster
- Directed by: Anita Udeep
- Written by: Anita Udeep
- Produced by: Anita Udeep
- Starring: Oviya; Anson Paul; Masoom Shankar; Monisha Ram; Shree Gopika; Bommu Lakshmi
- Cinematography: Arvind Krishna
- Edited by: Anthony
- Music by: Silambarasan
- Production company: Nviz Entertainment
- Release date: 1 March 2019
- Running time: 129 minutes
- Country: India
- Language: Tamil

90 ML is a 2019 Indian Tamil-language coming-of-age comedy drama film written and directed by Anita Udeep. The film stars Oviya in the lead role, while Anson Paul, Masoom Shankar, Monisha Ram, Shree Gopika, and Bommu Lakshmi play supporting roles. The film is produced by Udeep under Nviz Entertainment. The film's soundtrack was composed by Silambarasan with editing done by Anthony and cinematography by Arvind Krishna. 90 ML is among the first openly lesbian-related films in Tamil cinema. It was released on 1 March 2019.

== Plot ==
Thamarai and her husband Sathish visit a drug rehabilitation centre for a counselling session with a psychologist named Dr. Priyadarshini, but Sathish, who is a rowdy, walks out with haste.

Thamarai then starts to narrate how Rita moved to their apartment, where she mingles with the neighbours Kajal, Paru, Suganya, and Thamarai. One day, Rita notices Thamarai crying and gets to know that it is her birthday and that her husband is not even aware of it. She decides to throw a party on the terrace, where they all drink beer and open up about their personal lives. They go to Tasmac, where Sathish comes and picks them up. Later, Thamarai and Sathish cozy up and have sex, but he warns her to never meet her drunkard friends.

Eventually, after sometime, they all meet in Rita's house as Suganya asks for a party where she goes mad, but she reveals that her lover Chris is getting married at Pondicherry. They all go there, kidnap the couple, and bring them to Suganya — she runs and hugs the bride, leaving everyone in shock. They end up at a police station, where they are sent off with a warning. Rita's boyfriend and Sathish have a small scuffle.

Later, Rita's boyfriend Venky agrees for marriage, which she declines, and they break up. They all meet up with Suganya and her partner, where they decide to switch from drinks to cannabis. They seek the help of youths to get weed, but they are chased by cops. They end up in a crossfire between Sathish and his rival gang, but he saves them.

Kajal then says that her husband has an affair. They all go there and ridicule him, and Paru says that she has not consummated her marriage. She confronts her husband, and he tells her that he was in love with another girl and was forced into marriage, so they decide to divorce.

Finally, Thamarai cries out and seeks her friends' help to free Sathish from his bald boss. They all go to his hideout, fight the henchmen, and hold the boss at gunpoint, while Sathish comes to save him.

Later, they are all partying (again), where a guy (Simbu) says to his lover that he does not believe in marriage; he is not anyone's property, and they break up. They all watch him and suggest that he is more like Rita. She walks to him and gives him a lip lock.

== Cast ==
- Oviya as Rita
- Anson Paul as Venky
- Masoom Shankar as Kajal
- Monisha Ram as Suganya "Sugi"
- Shreegopika Neelanath as Paru
- Bommu Lakshmi as Thamarai
- Tej Charanraj as Sathish
- Soundariya Nanjundan as Christine "Chris"
- Arvind Sivakumar as Abhi, Kajal's husband
- Devadarshini as Dr. Priyadarshini (cameo appearance)
- Silambarasan as Rita's fling at the bar (cameo appearance)

== Soundtrack ==
The soundtrack was composed by Silambarasan. The first single, "Marana Matta", sung by Oviya, was released on 31 December 2017. It is her singing debut.

Track listing
No.	Title	Singer(s)	Length
1.	"Marana Matta"	Oviya, Silambarasan, Harish Kalyan	3:15
2.	"Beer Biriyani"	Maria	4:52
3.	"Friendy Da"	Aishwarya, Maria, Deepika, Priyanka NK	4:15
4.	"Sivabaanam"	Silambarasan, Anita Udeep	4:48
5.	"Kadhal Kadikkuthu"	Silambarasan	4:30
Total length:			21:40

== Release and reception ==
The film was initially scheduled to be released 22 February 2019, but ultimately released over a week later, on 1 March. Srivatsan S. of The Hindu wrote, "The film is yet another case of cinematic marvel where the filmmaker thinks that gender reversal is the ultimate act of liberating women from the shackles of society [...] 90 ml ends up being one of those so-called 'adult entertainers' that needs to be called out for its terribly unimaginative ideas and insensitive portrayal of LGBT communities". Thinkal Menon of The Times of India said the film "has nothing new to offer in terms of story. We have seen similar stories with men playing lead roles", adding, thay "there are audiences who might enjoy watching girls in a never before seen manner as far as Tamil cinema is concerned. What the film lacks is a proper emotional connect though it entertains to a certain extent. A strong screenplay would have made the movie better".

Sudhir Srinivasan of Cinema Express reviewed the film more favourably, saying, "90ML isn't great cinema, sure, but it's still far better than some of our recent adult comedies, if only because you see it from the perspective of women". Sowmya Rajendran of The News Minute wrote, "This is new wine in a new bottle – sure, the content itself isn't fantastic, but at least the experience is fresh". Ranjani Krishnakumar of HuffPost said it "is a terrible film. In fact, it's hardly a film: It's an inebriated vomit of giggles, pretensions, exaggerations and an over-acting Oviya", and also criticised the music, staging and cinematography . Sify wrote that the film "talks about feminism, liberation, and sexual issues of modern women. But the director often gets muddled, as she confuses feminism by glorifying boozing and smoking. The young girls in the film also crack double meaning jokes which are partly funny, mostly crass".
