= Mugangal =

Studio album by Anita Chandrasekharan, Mahesh Shankar
- Released: 2002 (India)
- Genre: Indian pop
- Label: Dreams Audio

Mugangal (transl. Faces) is a 2002 Tamil-language album performed by Anita Chandrasekharan and composed by Mahesh Shankar.

== Production ==
While studying for her master's in the United States, Anita Chandrasekharan sang "Kaadhal", which was composed by her college mate Mahesh Shankar, to her parents for their 25th wedding anniversary. Their appreciation for the song prompted Anita Chandrasekharan and Mahesh Shankar to create the album Mugangal. The decision to make it about emotions was so that it could have a universal appeal.

The album comprises six songs, each relating to a different emotion that you experience throughout life. "Kaadhal" (Love) is about a girl lost in the thought of love while "Inbam" (Happiness) is about a girl who finds pleasure in the little things in life. The songs contrasted each other with some of the songs like "Kaadhal" having a Carnatic rhythm with violin and mrindangam while other songs like "Pidivadham" (Stubbornness) appealed to the younger generation and had a western influence. The other three songs were "Sanchalam" (Apprehension), "Thunicchal" (Courage), and "Sogam" (Sadness), respectively.

== Track listing ==
All lyrics are written by Ramesh Chellamani; all music is composed by Mahesh Shankar.

Track listing
No.	Title	Singer(s)	Length
1.	"Kaadhal"	Anita Chandrasekharan	—
2.	"Inbam"	Anita Chandrasekharan	4:29
3.	"Sanchalam"	Anita Chandrasekharan	—
4.	"Thunicchal"	Anita Chandrasekharan	—
5.	"Sogam"	Anita Chandrasekharan, Deepak Mahadevan	—
6.	"Pidivadham"	Anita Chandrasekharan, Ramesh Chellamani	—
Total length:			—

== Reception and legacy ==
Vignesh Ram of Nilacharal wrote, "It's monotonous to hear all the songs in her voice. Though the concept taken in hand is to bring different emotions in the songs, her voice fails to express them". He concluded, "Anyway it is a good effort by the team and could have performed well with more involvement. Expecting a better album from them next time".

Cassettes for the album were sold in Chennai and CDs were sold online. According to Anita Chandrasekharan, the album did "pretty well" both in India and abroad. After listening to the album, J. D.–Jerry gave Anita Chandrasekharan the opportunity to sing "Azhagiya Asura" in Whistle (2003). The song "Inbam" was reused in the first season of The Family Man.

== Credits and personnel ==
- Vocals - Anita Chandrasekharan, Ramesh Chellamani, Deepak Mahadevan
- Composed, Programmed and Arranged by Mahesh Shankar
- Lyrics - Ramesh Chellamani
- Guitar - Brendan Neutra
- Additional Sequencing - Nandakumar Mahadevan
- Violin - Anuradha Sridhar
- Mrindangam and Gajeera - Sriram Brahmanandam
- Recorded, Mixed and Mastered at Spark Studios, Emeryville, CA
