= Udeep tribe =

The Udeep tribe of India represent about 300 families living in northern India. Based solely in the Himachal Pradesh of northern India, the Udeep(s) live in two different towns each controlled by a separate clan. The town of Junkow is the home to the Kulkarni clan while the Chhattispur clan manages the town of Aokini. The Udeep represent some of the last vestiges of Jainism remaining in that region of India and its essence is concern for the welfare of every being in the universe.

== History ==
A people of Dravidian descent, when they emigrated out of southern India away from the rest of the Dravidians is unclear but the migration appears to have happened in the mid 13th century after they sided with the invading Mongols and were driven out of the Southern Peninsula.
