= A. C. Murali Mohan =

Indian actor

- Born: Murali Mohan; 1 June 1960
- Died: 25 June 2014 (aged 54); Chennai, Tamil Nadu, India
- Occupation: Actor
- Years active: 1991-2014
- Spouse: Sumathi
- Children: 1

A. C. Murali Mohan (1960-25 June 2014) was an Indian actor who appeared in Tamil-language films and television. He acted in movies as well as appearing for several advertisements. He is notable for a popular commercial for Horlicks and was popularly called Horlicks Mama and also for his role as Laxman in the Popular serial Thendral.

In the early 1990s he started in a character and comedy based roles in Tamil films. He has acted in several serials and appeared in several advertisements.

== Partial filmography ==
Year	Film	Role	Notes
2000	Hey Ram	Parthasarathy	Bilingual film
2001	Minnale		
2001	Thavasi		
2001	Alli Thandha Vaanam	Television host	
2003	Boys		
2003	Knock Knock, I'm Looking to Marry	Nithya's father	English film
2006	Rendu		
2007	Sivaji	Doctor	Uncredited
2008	Kuruvi	Doctor	Uncredited
2012	Mayanginen Thayanginen		
2013	Kantha		
2014	Malini 22 Palayamkottai	Lalitha's husband	
2018	Moonavathu Kann		

=== Television ===
Year	Series/Show	Role	Notes
2010-12	Thendral	Laxman	Sun TV Serial
2013-14	Vamsam	Sendhil Raja	Sun TV Serial

== Death ==
He committed suicide by hanging himself from the roof on the night of 25 June 2014. He is survived by his wife Seetha Rani, and son Uma Shankar.
