= Underground Authority =

Rock band

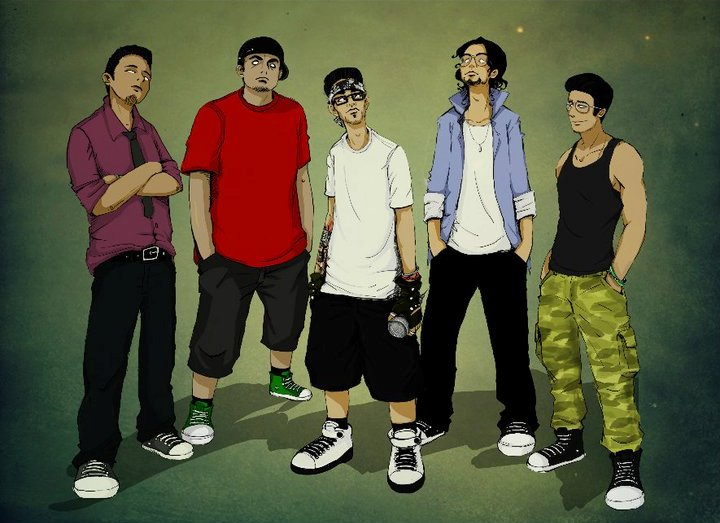

Background information
- Origin: Kolkata, West Bengal, India
- Genres: Rap rock, alternative rock, protest poetry, nu metal
- Years active: 2010–2017–2019–present
- Members: Adil Rashid; Soumyadeep Bhattacharya; Sourish Kumar
- Website: Underground Authority on ReverbNation

Underground Authority is an alternative rock and rap rock band from India. Formed in early 2010, in Kolkata, their music is flavoured by a blend of protest poetry, reggae, alternative rock, rap rock and hard rock. The band is noted for their socio-political messages and anti-capitalism agenda in their song lyrics.

The current line-up includes, Adil Rashid, Soumyadeep Bhattacharya and Sourish Kumar.

== History ==
=== Formation / early years / pre India's Got Talent ===
Underground Authority was formed in early 2010, when two of the previously existing acts from Kolkata, collaborated to put forth a new act together. They primarily started off performing in the premier pubs of Kolkata and participated in major music events, including the Closed Mic / Best of open mic at Someplace Else and Tuborg Unseen Underground Pub Rock festival. They were also the runners up at a national rock band competition, Yamaha Asian Beat 2010, held at Hard Rock Cafe in Mumbai.

If not rivalry, then we would surely prefer the term 'fierce competitors' to describe us in the past, when we used to face off and compete as a band at the national / local music circuit. But then again, we always had this dream of coming together as a unit at some point of time and fortunately, it happened on the pleasant evening of April 3, 2010. We figured that all five of us wanted to experiment and come up with something new and unique; so when the idea of Underground Authority came up, we straight away went for it as we all had a gut feeling that it would result in something fresh and inviting.

— Underground Authority at an interview for Eight Octaves, Music news and services in India.

On 17 May 2010 – They had performed at a concert in Kolkata organised by Power 107.8 FM to help promote mass awareness on the extinction on tigers in the country.

On 16 July 2010 – They had also been a part of a special night organised by popular city bands and individuals to offer a tribute to the Indian film music directors at the pub, 'Basement' at 'Samilton Hotel' in Kolkata. They performed A. R. Rahman directed songs, 'Rukmini' and 'Humma Humma' in their own versions as a tribute to the former.

=== !Banned ===
!Banned was a rap-metal band from the city, composed of Santhanam Srinivasan Iyer on the vocals, Kuntal De on the rhythm guitar, Roheet Mukhejee on the bass guitar and Anup Hela on the drums.

They were mostly active from time period January 2009– March 2010 and had won many rock band competitions held at the cultural festivals of colleges. Some of the notable are named below,

- 'Outlawed/Rivet 2010' – NUJS (The West Bengal National University of Juridical Sciences), Annual cultural festival – Battle of bands winners.
- 'Srijan 2010' – Indian School of Mines Dhanbad, Cultural Festival – 'Avalanche 2010' (Band competition) winners.
- 'Rockophonix 2010' – National Institute of Technology, Durgapur, Annual Cultural Festival – Battle of bands winners.
- 'Irock 2010'- Institute of Engineering and Management, Kolkata, Annual Cultural Festival – Band competition winners.
- 'Integration 2010' ISI (Indian Statistical Institute, Kolkata), Cultural-tech Festival – Band competition winners.
- 'Sanskriti 2010' – Jadavpur university, Cultural Festival organised by the students of the Engineering Department- Band competition Winners.
- 'Spunkz' 2010 – Pailan College of Management and Technology, Annual Cultural Festival – Band competition winners.
- 'Sanskriti 2010' – Jadavpur university, Cultural Festival organised by the students of the Arts Department – Band Competition winners.
- 'Cacophony 2010' – Calcutta Institute of Engineering and Management, Annual Cultural Festival – Battle of Bands winners.
- 'Springfest 2010' – IIT KGP (Indian Institute of Technology Kharagpur), Annual Cultural Festival – 'Wildfire' battle of bands runners up.
- 'AGON 2009' – Calcutta National Medical College, Annual Cultural Festival – Battle of bands winners.
- 'MITALI 2009' – Nil Ratan Sarkar Medical College and Hospital, Annual Cultural Festival – Battle of bands winners.
- Calcutta Medical College (Medical College and Hospital, Kolkata) – Battle of bands, Winners, 2009.
- 'Eclecia 2009' – Heritage Institute of Technology, Kolkata, Annual Cultural Festival – 'On the rocks' band competition, third-place winners.

On 23 January 2010, Kolkata, they had opened for Krishnakumar Kunnath, a famous Bollywood playback singer and were also awarded by him on stage, as the band had won the 'Times of Youth Challenge 2010' rock band competition organised by the Times of India and the Times group.

The band discontinued in April 2010, as the bass guitarist, Roheet Mukherjee left the band to join another city band Five Little Indians.

=== Skydive ===
Skydive started as a rap-rock side project that included Santhanam Srinivasan Iyer on the vocals/rap, Adil Rashid on the lead guitar, Soumyadeep Bhattacharya on the bass guitar, Bhaveen Juthani on the rhythm guitar and Sourish Kumar on the drums.

Though the activity of the band didn't span for more than three months, January to March 2010, the band had an unbeatable record of winning all the band competitions it had taken part in at cultural festivals of colleges. The following are the competitions they took part in,

- 'Oorja 2010' – Indian School of Mines Dhanbad, Cultural festival – Battle of bands winners.
- 'Kritansh 2010' – KIIT University, Annual cultural festival, 'Holocaust 2010' – Band competition winners.
- 'Almafiesta 2010' – Indian Institute of Technology Bhubaneswar, Annual cultural festival, 'Euphony 2010' – Band competition winners.
- 'Srijan 2010' – Shri Shikshayatan College, Annual cultural festival – Battle of bands winners.

On 28 January 2010 they took part and had won the band competition event at 'Caledonia 2010' – the annual cultural fest of Scottish Church College, Calcutta. Their original composition Private investigation of a microphone in Jerusalem was an instant hit among the audience and the judge, Radio Jockey Vineet of Red FM 93.5.

== Band members ==
=== Santhanam Srinivasan Iyer (EPR) ===
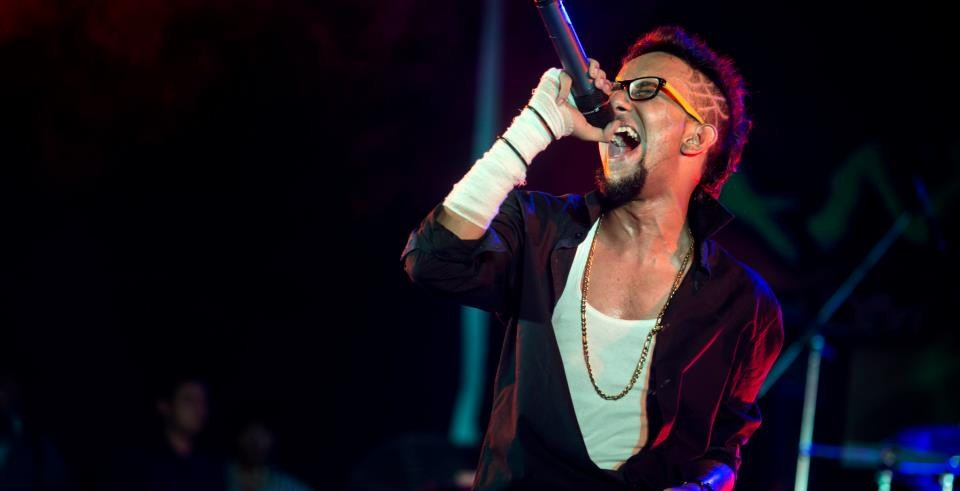
Santhanam Srinivasan Iyer (Epr) performing at an Underground Authority Concert held in Nazrul Mancha, Kolkata

Also known as E.P.R. (emcee/poet/rapper), Santhanam Srinivasan Iyer is the frontman / emcee of the band, he's one of the first emcees / rappers in the city to make a mark. He is noted for his stage presence and passionate delivery of vocals. He's also the lyricist of the band and is a follower of Anarchist Communism, which can be seen in his works.

Previously he used to often perform at open mic sessions at Someplace Else, Park Hotel, Kolkata and was a very popular performer since then. Iyer started to participate in online rap communities like Insignia, on Orkut. His interactions with the audience are powerful and he frequently crowd surfs at his performances. He also participated in the first season of MTV Hustle and finished runner-up next to winner, M Zee Bella. Since then, Iyer has returned to the show as a squad boss in every successive season. He released his debut solo studio album, Protest Poetry, in June 2020. Iyer announced his exit from the band in 2023.

There is very little space to jump. If I jump over you guys, will you hold me?

— Santhanam Srinivasan Iyer at a performance, Unseen Underground Pub Rock Festival.

=== Adil Rashid ===
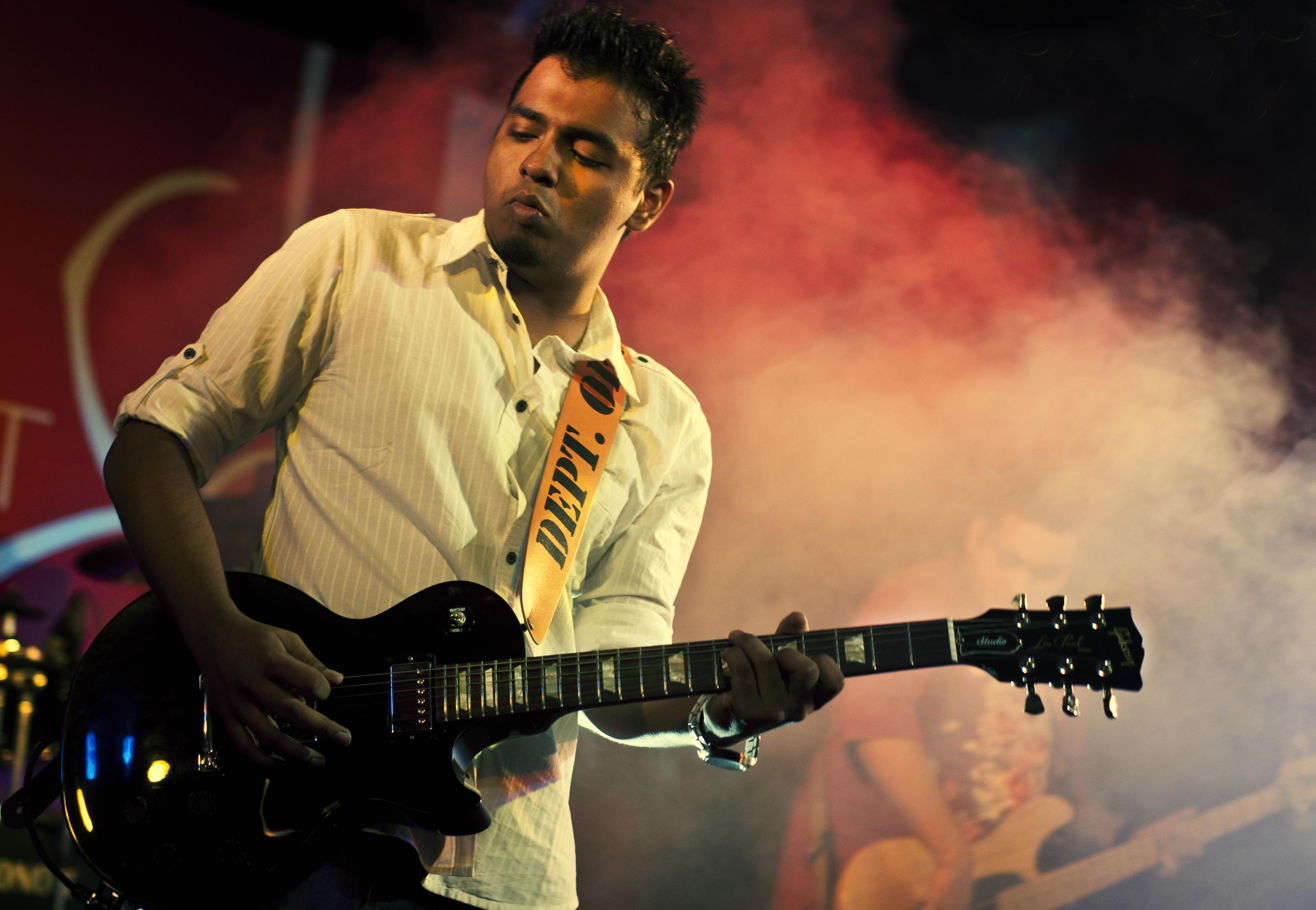
Adil Rashid

He is the lead guitarist of the band and is a Gibson supported artist from Gibson Guitar Corporation. He specialises in jazz, blues, funk, rock and metal. His inspirations are Paul Gilbert (Mr Big), Yngwie Malmsteen, Slash (Guns N' Roses), Vito Bratta, to name a few. He is also the grandson of Mohammed Salim, who was the first Indian footballer to play overseas, in 1936 for the Scottish club Celtic FC 1st division.

=== Soumyadeep Bhattacharya ===
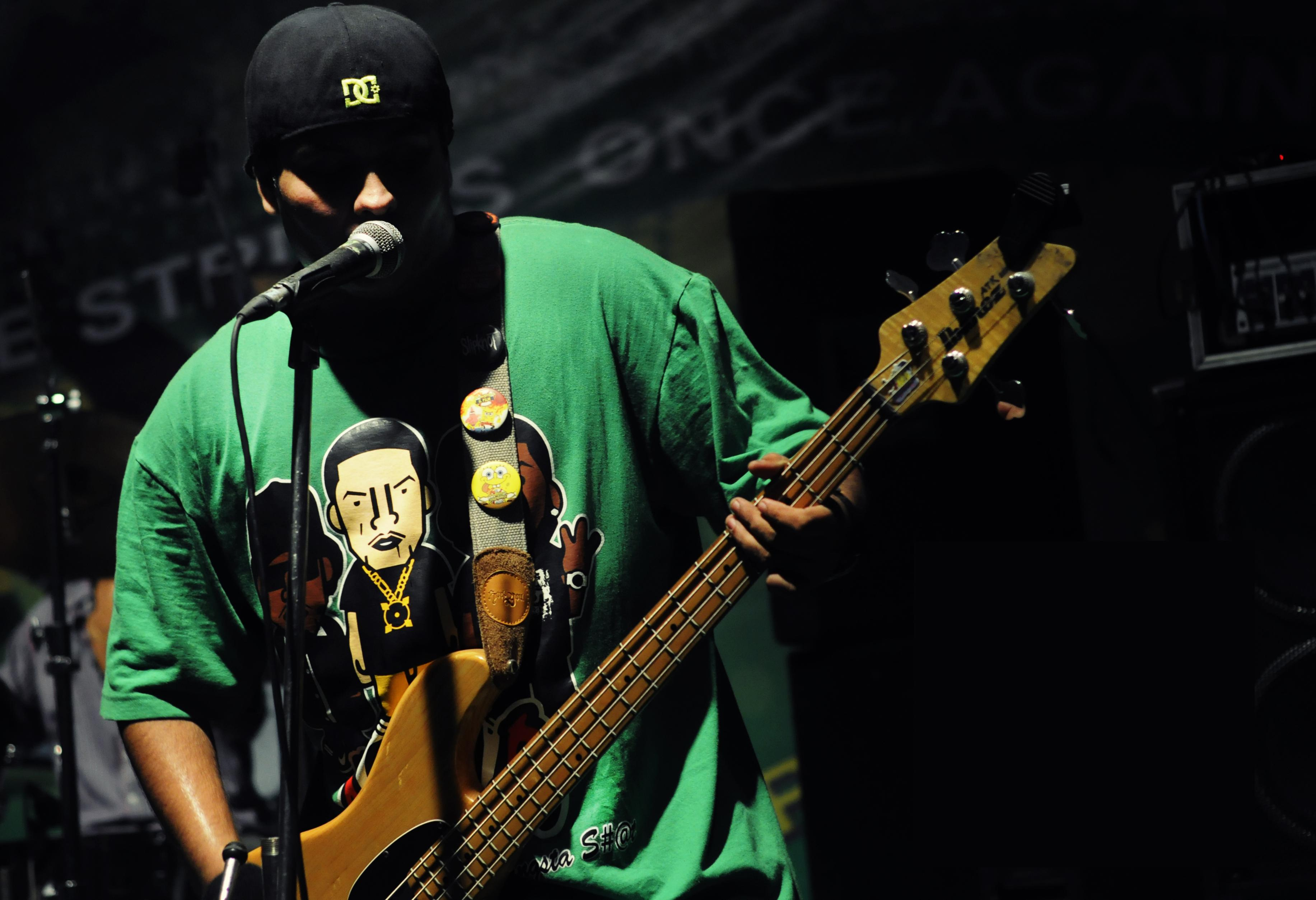
Soumyadeep Bhattacharya

Soumyadeep Bhattacharya alias 'Bubbla' is the bassist in the band. He states that he fell in love with the instrument called the bass guitar when he first saw it in a shop.

=== Sourish Kumar ===
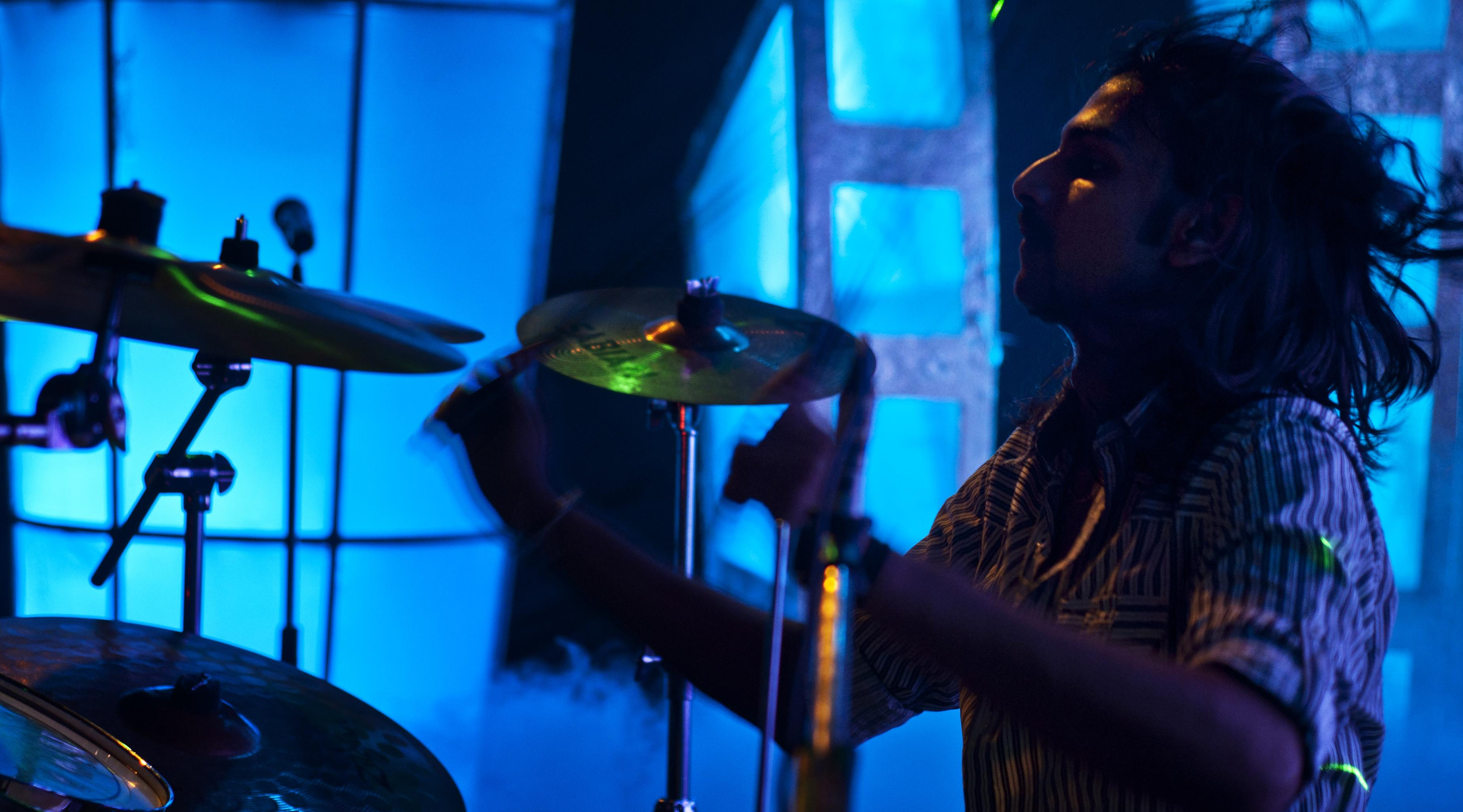
Sourish Kumar

Sourish is the drummer of the band. He is extremely versatile and received the best drummer award at Hornbill International Rock Contest 2013. He is one of the best drummers from Kolkata.

== Musical influences ==
"You Can't Stop"
A 29-second sample of the song "You Can't Stop", one of the singles recorded by Underground Authority in the year 2010 just after India's Got Talent (Season 2).

Underground Authority is known for its original compositions, which always tend to portray a political message which they term it as "Protest Poetry". Some of their popular original songs include,

- "Microphone" (a tribute to the song Handlebars by Flobots)
- "Realize" (a song which is completely based on the establishment of a classless society and Communism),
- "You Can't Stop Us" (a song which speaks against Racism),
- "We Kill G.I. Joes" (a song which addresses the stereotypical society being dominated by the ideals of materialism)

Apart from their originals their acts also include the rap-rock remixed versions of A R Rahman's songs –

- "Urvashi"
- "Humma Humma"
- "Rukmani"
- "Kabhi Kabhi Aditi"
- "Maa Tujhe Salam"

The band cites Rage Against the Machine, KRS-One, Cypress Hill, Living Colour, Public Enemy and The Roots as their biggest musical influences.

== India's Got Talent – Khoj −2 ==
Underground Authority tried their luck at the auditions of the second season of India's Got Talent, which is a large-scale televised entertainment variety show created by Simon Cowell and Syco TV. The show presents India's best unknown acts and talents, and made their maiden appearance on national television through Colors TV.

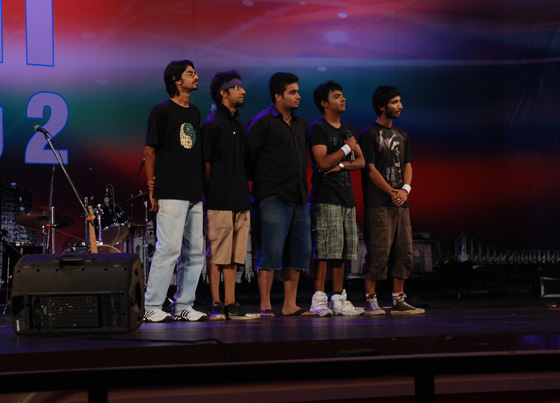
Underground Authority in the audition round of India's Got Talent

During the nationwide talent competition, the band covered A. R. Rahman's hits in their own style, which secured their position as one of the nine finalists in the show, earning them a huge fan following. During the competition, the band performed a song from the soundtrack of the Hindi action film Dabangg, which starred guest judge Salman Khan.

The band received an overwhelming response from the Indian audience, winning the hearts of Indian celebrities, including Salman Khan, Sonali Bendre, Nikhil Chinapa, Ayushmann Khurrana and Kirron Kher. Salman Khan requested them to remix the whole Dabangg soundtrack album, in their own unique style. After India's Got Talent, the band became known for twisting Bollywood retro songs and presenting them in their own style of music.

During the television shoot for the auditions of India's Got Talent, in Kolkata, Nikhil Chinapa had liked their performance so much that he had instantly uploaded a status message on them on his account on the social networking site, Twitter.

In all my years of listening to Indian bands, this was one group that gave me goosebumps!

— Nikhil Chinapa on Underground Authority.

== Hornbill International Rock Competition 2013 ==
Hornbill International Rock Competition (HIRC 2013) was a part of the annual cultural extravaganza, Hornbill Festival, which showcases the rich Naga culture and is organised by the state government of Nagaland's Music Task Force (MTF), department of Youth Resources and Sports.

Hornbill International (formerly National) Rock Contest is also the longest music festival in the country, it being a seven-day-long festival. India's biggest prize money for battle of bands contest has been an integral event of the Hornbill Festival extravaganza since its inception in 2000. The contest was held at the newly constructed venue at Solidarity Park, Kohima from 1 to 10 December.

On celebrating the 50th year of statehood, of Nagaland, the government decided to double up the prize money for the competition to make it grander and to have something to remember.

The selected bands competed for the top prize of a whopping 10,00,000/- (1 Million INR), 2,50,000/- (250 thousand INR) for the second place and 1,50,000/- (150 thousand INR) for the third place. Individual Prizes for Best Vocalist, Best Guitarist, Best Drummer, Best Bassist will also be given with a prize money of INR 30,000/- each and other surprise Sponsored Prizes.

On 10 December, following the final performances by the short-listed bands, it was announced that 'Underground Authority' were this year's un-doubted winners along with winning, other individual prizes of Best Vocalist ( Santhanam Srinivasan Iyer), Best Bassist (Soumyadeep Bubbla Bhattacharya), Best Drummer ( Sourish Kumar) and Best Runner's up guitarist (Adil Rashid).

While every other band was out feasting on local cuisine and rice beer, Kolkata band Underground Authority were rehearsing hard on the second stage (I spotted the band jamming four times in three days)

— Anurag Tagat, Rolling Stone India on Underground Authority winning HIRC 2013.

The competition was judged by True School of Music co-founder Ashutosh Phatak, Nagaland youth activist and pastor Doring Lungalung and actor Purab Kohli.

Hornbill International Rock Contest 2013 Winners:

- Winners: Underground Authority (Kolkata)
- 1st Runners-Up: We The Giants (Dimapur)
- 2nd Runners-Up: The F16s (Chennai)
- Best Vocalist: Santhanam Srinivasan Iyer (Underground Authority)
- Best Guitarist: Aren Longkumer (Infuse)
- Best Bassist: Soumyadeep Bhattacharya (Underground Authority)
- Best Drummer Sourish Kumar (Underground Authority)
- Best Keyboardist: Harshan Radhakrishnan (The F16s)

We have won almost all the big rock fests in India. We have had 21 wins so far. Hornbill was the only one left for us and we knew, if we had this in our kitty, we would have aced every prestigious rock competition in the country. We rehearsed day in and day out. For us, this was the last competition, at least in India. We went in with one goal: to win

— Epr on an interview to Calcutta Times, Times of India on Underground Authority winning HIRC 2013.

== Professional career ==
The band has toured and performed at events across India, including college festivals and concerts. They have has also raised funds for charities and welfare projects on subjects like education, healthcare, livelihood, women empowerment, and advocacy.

== Tracks ==
No.	Title	Writer(s)	Length
1.	"Microphone"	Underground Authority	4:50
2.	"Realise"	Underground Authority	4:37
3.	"You can't Stop"	Underground Authority	3:52
4.	"Urvashi (Cover)"	A. R. Rahman	4:33
5.	"Dabangg (Scratch Demo)"	Underground Authority	2:48
6.	"Where the streets have a name"	Underground Authority	5:31
7.	"Kaash Meri Girlfriend (Demo)"	Underground Authority	1:31
8.	"We Rise (Demo)"	Underground Authority	1:26

== See also ==
- Rock music of West Bengal
