= Harpreet Sawhney =

American electrical engineer

Harpreet Sawhney is an American electrical engineer at SRI International in Trenton, New Jersey. He was named a Fellow of the Institute of Electrical and Electronics Engineers (IEEE) in 2012 for his work with video algorithms.
