= Anita Udeep =

Indian film director

- Born: Anita Chandrasekharan; 1978 (age 47–48); Chennai, Tamil Nadu, India
- Occupations: Director, writer, producer, playback singer
- Years active: 2009–present
- Notable work: "Azhagiya Asura"
- Spouse: Udeep (m. 2003)
- Children: 2

Anita Udeep (formerly Anita Chandrasekharan) is an Indian director, screenwriter, producer and playback singer, who has worked on Tamil and English-language films.

== Career ==
Anita initially studied an engineering degree in Chennai, before enrolling at Loyola Marymount University in Los Angeles to do a master's degree in Film and TV Production for three years. During her time in the United States, Anita made a series of short films such as Flowery Thorn and Om, while also working as an intern for Steven Spielberg's science fiction miniseries Taken (2002). Anita had a strong interest in the Indian film industry and initially worked as a singer in Tamil films after returning to India. She produced a Tamil pop album Mugangal. Her early songs included "Azhagiya Asura" from D. Imman's album for the Tamil slasher film Whistle (2003), was a hit.

Aged 25, Anita opted to direct her first feature film in 2003 and subsequently made the English language film Knock Knock, I'm Looking to Marry for her home production studios NVIZ Entertainment. Starring actors Rathi Arumugam and Suhaas Ahuja in the lead roles, the film was made by a young crew including cinematographer Preetha Jayaraman and music composer Mahesh Shankar. She later directed the animated film Gulliver's Travel for Pentamedia Graphics, and the film got short listed for the semifinals at the Oscar awards.

Anita continued her interest in films by opting to make Indian language films and wrote, produced and directed the Tamil college drama Kulir 100° (2009) starring Sanjeev and Riya Bamniyal in the lead roles. The script was based on the lives of wealthy college kids in a boarding school in Ooty. The film garnered pre-release publicity owing to its popular music album, and the film fared average at the box office .

Anita then worked with actress Oviya for the coming-of-age film 90ML (2019), which garnered publicity prior to its release for its tackling of historically taboo subjects in Tamil cinema. Despite the controversies and negative reviews, the film did well commercially and was a hit at the box office.

== Personal life ==
Her father Chandrasekhar was the chairman of Pentamedia.

Anita is married to Udeep, the CEO of Splash TV channel, and has 2 sons.

== Filmography ==
Year	Film	Director	Writer	Producer	Language	Notes
2003	Knock Knock, I'm Looking to Marry	Yes	Yes	Yes	English	
2005	Gulliver's Travel	Yes	No	No	English	
2009	Kulir 100°	Yes	Yes	Yes	Tamil	
2019	90ML	Yes	Yes	Yes	Tamil	

== Discography ==
Year	Film/Album	Song	Language	Notes
2002	Mugangal	"Kaadhal"	Tamil	
2002	Mugangal	"Inbam"	Tamil	
2002	Mugangal	"Sanchalam"	Tamil	
2002	Mugangal	"Thunicchal"	Tamil	
2002	Mugangal	"Sogam"	Tamil	
2002	Mugangal	"Pidivadham"	Tamil	
2003	Whistle	"Azhagiya Asura"	Tamil	
2003	Flavors	"At Home"	English	
2004	Meesai Madhavan	"Vaada Vaada"	Tamil	
2005	Thaka Thimi Tha	"Rayalaseema Rani"	Tamil	
2019	90ML	"Sivabaanam"	Tamil	
