= Kappa TV =

Indian television channel

KappaTV
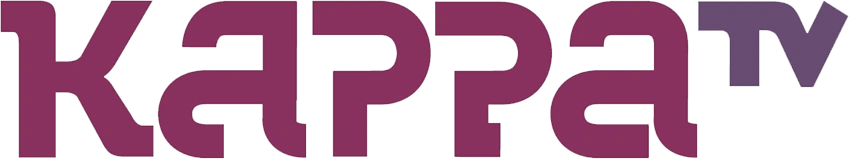
- Logo used since 2013
- Broadcast area: India
- Headquarters: Thiruvananthapuram, Kerala

Programming
- Language: Malayalam

Ownership
- Owner: Mathrubhumi
- Sister channels: Mathrubhumi News

History
- Launched: 1 February 2013; 13 years ago

Kappa TV is an Indian Malayalam language free to air youth music channel owned by Mathrubhumi. The channel was named after tapioca, a starch extracted from the root of the cassava plant, which is called "kappa" in Malayalam language. The channel focus on youth oriented programs. Music Mojo, which features bands from Kerala and other southern Indian states, is a popular program on Kappa TV. The studios are located in Thiruvananthapuram and Kochi.

In 2023, Kappa diversified into a production house and independent music label, in addition to the TV channel. As of 15 January 2023, at a live event held at Durbar Hall, Kochi, Kappa successfully launched the music label Kappa Originals, with the project "I'm Original".
