= B. V. S. Ravi =

Indian film maker (born 1974)

B.V.S.Ravi
- Born: Bachimanchi Venkata Subrahmanyam Ravi; 22 June 1974 (age 52); Nidadavole, Andhra Pradesh, India
- Occupations: Screenwriter, Director, Actor and Producer
- Years active: 2002—present
- Spouse: Sri Latha

Bachimanchi Venkata Subrahmanyam Ravi, better known as B. V. S. Ravi or Macha Ravi, is an Indian screenwriter, director, actor and producer who works in Telugu cinema.

== Personal life ==
He was born in Nidadavole town in Andhra Pradesh and is a native Vijayawada. His father was a lecturer in Economics and his mother is a homemaker. Ravi did his schooling from NSM Public school, a highly reputed school in Vijayawada. After graduating in Civil engineering from VEC Engineering College, Bellari, he moved to Hyderabad to pursue a career in the movies. He is known to be a voracious reader. His writing style is known for quick wit and high drama.

He is married to Srilatha and resides in Hyderabad with his family.

== Career ==
=== Writer ===
Ravi has started out as an assistant to Posani Krishna Murali and has worked under him for over 54 movies. During this period, he had developed close association with Koratala Siva & Boyapati Srinu.

In 2002, he cemented his place as commercial writer in the industry with his first story Girlfriend. He gained notable recognition as an assistant writer for the movies Bhadrachalam & Seetharama Raju.

Ravi started working independently in 2003 and had scored a major success with the critically acclaimed commercial hit movie, Satyam. He continues to flourish as a writer and has worked with K Raghavendra Rao, Boyapati Srinu, Koratala Siva, V.V. Vinayak, Puri Jagannath, Bommarillu Bhaskar, YVS Chowdary etc. He has written for all major stars in the industry - Chiranjeevi, Balakrishna, Nagarjuna, Venkatesh, Mohanbabu, Pawan Kalyan, Prabhas, Junior NTR, Allu Arjun, Raviteja etc.

His notable works as a writer include Satyam, Bhadra, Parugu, King, Denikaina Ready etc.

In 2012, he started his long-term association with Puri Jagannath and has written for major projects Devudu Chesina Manushulu, Cameraman Ganga tho Rambabu, Iddarammayilatho etc.

He is also an in-house writer for the production house Sri Venkateswara Creations helmed by noted producer “Dil” Raju.

=== Director ===
Ravi ventured as a director with the movie Wanted starring Gopichand. The movie was received with lukewarm response from the audience and was declared commercially unsuccessful at the box office.

His second venture as a director was with the movie Jawaan starring Sai Dharam Tej. The movie was a moderate success and has received critical acclaim.

=== Producer ===
Ravi started his stint as a producer with the movie Second Hand. The movie has received rave reviews and has created a lot of buzz in the social media. The song “Subbarao” in the movie is known for being shot in single shot during the early days of digital movie making.

Kishore Tirumala has started his career as a director with this movie and Vijay Binni has debuted as a choreographer.

He also produced Sarvam Shaktimayam for Zee5. This is a docu-drama which stood out to be a “one of its kind” project in the Indian streaming space.

Ravi also has written for the Netflix show Rana Naidu with Venkatesh Daggubati and Rana Daggubati in the leading roles.

== Filmography ==
=== As director and screenwriter ===
| Year | Title | Notes |
|---|---|---|
| 2011 | Wanted | Debut in as Director |
| 2017 | Jawaan | |

=== As a producer ===
| Year | Title | Notes |
|---|---|---|
| 2013 | Second Hand | Debut in as Producer |

=== As a screenwriter ===
| Year | Work | Writer | Notes |
|---|---|---|---|
| 2002 | Girl Friend | Story | |
| 2002 | Khaidi Brothers | Yes | |
| 2002 | Khadgam | Uncredited | |
| 2003 | Satyam | Dialogue | |
| 2005 | Bhadra | Dialogue | |
| 2005 | Ayodhya | Yes | |
| 2005 | Chakram | Uncredited | |
| 2005 | Nayakudu | Dialogue | |
| 2005 | Dhana 51 | Dialogue | |
| 2006 | Raam | Yes | |
| 2006 | Naayudamma | Story, dialogue | |
| 2007 | Athidhi | Uncredited | |
| 2007 | Munna | Dialogue | |
| 2008 | Parugu | Dialogue | |
| 2008 | King | Dialogue | |
| 2008 | Tulasi | Uncredited | |
| 2009 | Saleem | Yes | |
| 2009 | Jayeebhava | Story, dialogue | |
| 2010 | Jhummandi Naadam | Yes | |
| 2010 | Thakita Thakita | Yes | |
| 2012 | Devudu Chesina Manushulu | Uncredited | |
| 2012 | Cameraman Gangatho Rambabu | Uncredited | |
| 2012 | Denikaina Ready | Story | |
| 2013 | Iddarammayilatho | Uncredited | |
| 2013 | Gouravam | Dialogue | |
| 2014 | Pandavulu Pandavulu Tummeda | Story | |
| 2015 | Dynamite | Dialogue | |
| 2021–present | Unstoppable | Yes | Talk show |
| 2022 | Thank You | Yes | |
| 2023–present | Rana Naidu | Yes | Netflix series |

=== As an actor ===
| Year | Title | Role |
|---|---|---|
| 2004 | Kedi No:1 | |
| 2005 | Sravanamasam | |
| 2005 | Ayodhya | |
| 2006 | Naayudamma | |
| 2021 | Krack | Bystander |
| 2022 | Dhamaka | |
| 2023 | Veera Simha Reddy | |
| 2023 | Waltair Veerayya | |
| 2023 | 9x10=91 | |
| 2023 | Bedurulanka 2012 | Film producer |
| 2024 | Mr. Bachchan | Chalapathi |
| 2025 | Jaat | Constable Ravi |
| 2025 | Anaganaga | |
