= Okka Magaadu =

2008 Indian film by Y. V. S. Chowdary

- Theatrical release poster
- Directed by: Y. V. S. Chowdary
- Written by: Y. V. S. Chowdary; Chintapalli Ramana (dialogues)
- Produced by: Y. V. S. Chowdary
- Starring: Nandamuri Balakrishna; Anushka Shetty; Simran; Nisha Kothari; Ashutosh Rana
- Cinematography: Madhu A. Naidu; C. Ramprasad
- Edited by: Kotagiri Venkateswara Rao
- Music by: Mani Sharma
- Production company: Bommarillu
- Release date: 11 January 2008
- Running time: 178 minutes
- Country: India
- Language: Telugu

Okka Magaadu: One and Only (transl. One man army) is a 2008 Indian Telugu-language vigilante action comedy film co-written, produced and directed by Y. V. S. Chowdary. The film stars Nandamuri Balakrishna, Anushka Shetty, Simran, Nisha Kothari and Ashutosh Rana. The film's music was composed by Mani Sharma. The film was overwhelmingly criticized for plagiarism with the 1996 Tamil film Indian. The film was a box-office bomb.

== Plot ==
The film begins with Veera Venkata Satyanarayana Swamy, an arbiter of a terrain esteemed as a deity. In his reign, that area is eternal from four sides. He resides with his grandmother. Sarada looks hyperactive, but Satyanarayana treats her as an infant. Once, Satyanarayana defenses Chief Minister Namboodriyar's son, when his father opposes his relation with his girlfriend. After saving him from chief minister's goons, Satyanarayana call chief minister, who proceeds and panics, sighting his tremendous vast acolytes of Satyanarayana. He gallantly espouses them in front of chief minister, which infuriates him. At that juncture, Bhavani, chief minister's daughter, lusts Satyanarayana. Parallelly, Aliveelu, a journalist, also crushes for him, and the two compete.

Meanwhile, the doctors, lawyers, and journalists terrifically vitiated society when a 101-year-old man, Okka Magadu, raises a missing in action against them. He allegedly kills the miscreants, but their bodies are missing, and that catastrophe creates mayhem in the country. Today, the government handed over the case to CBI under the charge of AK, who is in the thick of it. So, he makes a trap to clutch the secret killer. Plus, he views CCTV footage of the Okka Magadu abducting a judge. Upon which, AK affirms it is impossible the man is old by his body language & strength and uncovers his young shade, i.e., Satyanarayana. Since it is not feasible in his area, they silently operate at night and seize him.

Simultaneously, the chief minister ruses to eliminate his son and his girlfriend, and assaults them when they stab Sarada while hindering them. Here lands Okka Mogadu, Sarada's husband, a guerrilla & tall warrior whom she discerns and faints. Concurrently, CBI is under the interrogation of Satyanarayana while Okka Mogadu arrives and acquits him, stating he is a homicide. Next, he absconds from there, amid AK traces particular relevance between Satyanarayana & Okka Mogadu. So, he reaches their village and claims Okka Magadu is a traitor when enraged Sarada reveals him as a great patriot who dedicated his life to the country.

Past: Now, the tale shifts to the pre-independence era. Okka Magadu is a benevolent doctor who treats everyone equally and believes that human life is precious. Plus, he impedes participation in the movement as he promised his parents to take care of his younger. During that period, an evil British controlling authority, Douglas, omits conformity and ruthlessly kills anybody. Once, he slaughters the siblings of Raghupati Raghava Rajaram when he turns into a rebel Okka Magadu as incensed. Later, Douglas attempts to molest Sarada, an insurgent, when Okka Magadu decapitates him and knits her. Following, he knocks down Britishers gigantically. Hence, they declared independence, providing that all the revolutionaries surrendered as POW, including Okka Magadu. Before leaving, he promises pregnant Sarada to return.

Present: After 60 years, Okka Magadu escapes from their prison and reaches India. Whereat he experiences the contrast between virtual & reality. Satyanarayana is delighted to know such a man of the mark as his grandfather. Further, Okka Magadu retrieves the ill-gotten gains of chief minister from the Swiss bank and endows them to human welfare organizations. Thus, the livid chief minister planned the killing and forged it as a protest to protect Okka Magadu. He announced blood money for victims, accelerating massive suicides out of poverty. It is inevitable for Okka Magadu's famous appearance before the open court at a stadium between giant applause. On the spot, Okka Magadu exposes the diabolic shade of chief minister and produces the outlaws who are supposed to be slain by him before the judiciary. At last, all the criminals, including chief minister, plan to cross the borders on a flight that crashed by Okka Magadu. After a while, a reporter moves to Sarada, and she proclaims that he will be back. Finally, the movie ends with showing Okka Magadu walking between the mountains by the side of the exploded aircraft.

== Cast ==
- Nandamuri Balakrishna in a dual role as Raghupati Raghava Rajaram and Veera Venkata Satyanarayana Swamy
- Anushka Shetty as Bhavani, Swamy's love interest and Namboodriyar's daughter
- Simran as Sarada alias Baby, Swamy's grandmother
- Nisha Kothari as Alivelu, Swamy's love interest
- Ashutosh Rana as Chief Minister Namboodriyar
- Ravi Kale as CBI Officer
- Kota Srinivasa Rao
- Giri Babu
- Chandra Mohan
- Subbaraju as CBI Officer's assistant
- Chalapathi Rao
- Ranganath
- Sivaji Raja
- Annapurna
- Rajyalakshmi
- Raghu Babu as Namboodriyar's personal assistant
- Ravi Prakash as Ravi
- Krishna Bhagawan
- Chinna
- Lakshmipati
- Raghunatha Reddy
- G. V. Sudhakar Naidu
- Narsingh Yadav
- Devadas Kanakala
- Bandla Ganesh
- Salim Baig
- Sameer Hasan
- Sravan
- Prabhakar
- Ping Pong Surya
- Prasad Babu
- Narayana Rao
- Hari Prasad
- Siva Prasad
- Siva Parvathi
- Alapathi Lakshmi
- Haritha
- Karishma

== Production ==
The project was announced on 9 August 2006. Director Y. V. S. Chowdary got the title Okka Magaadu from a song composed by M. M. Keeravani for the film Seetayya (2003). After registering the title, Chowdary began developing a screenplay tailored for a "hero worshipping" film. He believed that Nandamuri Balakrishna was "the only hero who could do justice" to the role and presented the screenplay to him during the post-production of Devadasu (2006). Chowdary said he would have scrapped the project if Balakrishna had turned it down. Chowdary described the film as a "South Indian spicy meal".

Filming began in December 2006, but only three songs were completed in the following four months. After a hiatus, shooting resumed in April 2007 and completed in December that year. The film was shot in various locations, including Australia, Malaysia, Rayalaseema, Rajahmundry, and Hyderabad. The old aged looks of Balakrishna and Simran were designed by Eeswar, and the team went to the United States for 20 days to consult with make-up technicians. Applying the makeup took four hours, and removing it took one hour for Balakrishna.

== Soundtrack ==
Okka Maggadu

Soundtrack album by Mani Sharma
- Released: 21 December 2007
- Recorded: 2007
- Genre: Soundtrack
- Length: 35:57
- Label: Supreme Music
- Producer: Mani Sharma

Mani Sharma chronology
Godava (2007)	Okka Maggadu (2007)	Ontari (2008)

Music composed by Mani Sharma. Lyrics were written by Chandrabose. The music was released on 21 December 2007.

Track-List
No.	Title	Singer(s)	Length
1.	"Okka Magaadu"	Rita, Bhargavi	5:41
2.	"Devadi Deva"	Vijay Yesudas, Ranjith	5:47
3.	"Nanu Paalinchaga"	Mallikarjun, Rita	5:04
4.	"Aa Aaa Ee Eee"	Rahul Nambiar, Janani Madhan (Jey)	4:58
5.	"Ammatho"	Naveen, Anushka Manchanda	4:57
6.	"Rey"	Rita	4:37
7.	"Pattuko Pattuko"	S. P. Balasubrahmanyam, Chitra	4:53
Total length:			35:57

== Release ==
Okka Magaadu was released in theatres on 11 January 2008.

=== Critical reception ===
Critic from Sify gave an unfavourable review, stating it to have "silly graphics, non-serious getups of Balakrishna, confused first half, monotonous screenplay and mediocre direction". However, he said that the songs were a "good watch", except for the last song.
