= Pradip Somasundaran =

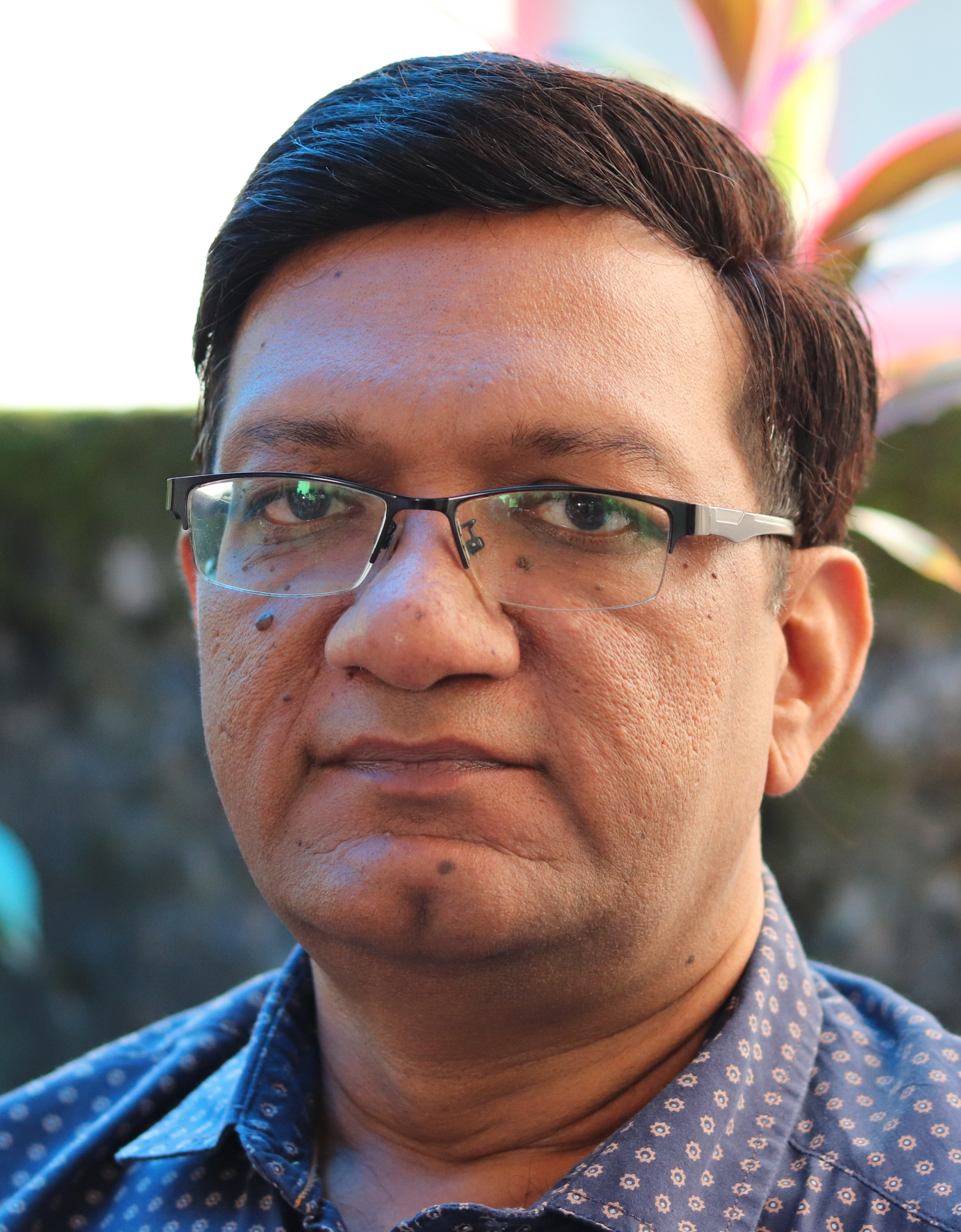
- Born: 26 January 1967 (age 59); Nelluvaya, Thrissur, India
- Education: Bharathidasan University
- Occupations: Singer; composer; music producer; lecturer
- Years active: 1993–present
- Spouse: Ranjini Pradip
- Children: 2
- Musical career
- Genres: Indian classical music; Playback singing; Filmi
- Instrument: Vocals
- Labels: East Coast Audios; His Master's Voice

Pradip Somasundaran (born 26 January 1967) is an Indian playback singer, who sang around 100 songs in Malayalam, Tamil and Hindi languages. He is also a college principal by profession.

== Early life ==
Pradip Somasundaran was born on 26 January 1967 in Nelluvaya, Thrissur district of Kerala. His parents are Somasundaran and Santha. He was initially trained in carnatic music under Geetha Rani and later under V. Gopalan of Thrissur, and started giving stage performances at the age of sixteen.

== Music career ==
It was music director Raveendran who gave Pradip the first break in 1993, with the song "Samayam Manoharam" in the film Ezhuthachan. He has also worked with the late Johnson, Mohan Sithara and Ilaiyaraaja in Malayalam. Sandeep Chowta introduced him in Telugu films with Bujjigadu directed by Puri Jagannadh. He also sang for Saleem another Sandeep Chowta musical, directed by YVS Chowdary. He has also sung the title song "Bhagavane" for the television series Gajarajan Guruvayur Keshavan which was composed by Vidyadharan for Surya TV. In addition to being a playback singer he sings carnatic music, ghazals and devotional songs.

In 2007 he released "Koti Pranam" his first international album as a composer and singer for the Art of Living foundation. In 2011 he released "Mazhanritham" his first musical work in Malayalam as a composer collaborating with other playback singers like Gayatri Asokan, Franco, Shahabaz Aman and actor Manoj K Jayan.

== Achievements ==
He won the "Lata Mangeshkar Trophy" for the best male singer along with Sunidhi Chauhan who won in the female category, in the national level music competition Meri Awaz Suno in 1996, which was telecast by Doordarshan. Meri Awaz Suno was conducted jointly by Doordarshan, Lata Mangeshkar, and Yash Chopra's Metavision.

== Personal life ==
Pradip holds a master's in electronics from Andhra University and is currently working as the principal of College of Applied Science Vadakkencherry. He is a free software enthusiast and was involved in the activities of the Free Software Foundation India during Richard Stallman's 2001 visit to Kochi. He has been residing at Thrissur for a long time.

== Discography ==
- Note (D) indicates dubbing.

=== Film songs ===
Song	Film	Released by	Music director	Year of release	Notes
Samayam Manoharam	Ezhuthachan	His Master's Voice (RPG)	Raveendran	1993	
Perumathodi	Mannadiyar Penninu Chenkotta Chekkan	Ankith Audio	Raveendran	1996	
Punyam	Kalyanappittennu	Sargam	Raveendran	1997	
Muthe Ninne Thedi	Manasam	Ankith Audio	Johnson	1997	
Vavaa Vo	Manasam	Ankith Audio	Johnson	1997	
Moham Manassil	Arjunan Pillayum Anju Makkalum	Sargam	Mohan Sitara	1997	
Mohini Enikkayi	Manjeeradhwani (D)	Johny Sagariga	Ilayaraaja	1998	Dubbed from the Telugu film Priyuralu
Sandhya Ragamai	Kannadikkadavathu	East Coast Audio	Balabhaskar	2000	
Manava Mochana	Arunam	–	Ramesh Narayan	2006 (To be Released)	
Chitti Aayi Re	Bujjigadu Made in Chennai (Telugu)	Aditya Audios	Sandeep Chowta	2008	
Poolu Gusa Gusa	Saleem (Telugu)	Sony Music	Sandeep Chowta	2009	
Virahardra, Muthola	Dhanyam (Malayalam)	Pooram Arts	K.K Sebastian	2012	
Chenkadalu Viriyunna	D Company (Malayalam)	Happy & Ruby	Ratheesh Vegha	2013	
Hey Ganga Maiya	Maiya	Iris Films	Poly Varghese	2018	
Nimisham	Kaliyuga (Telugu)	Aditya Music	D Kamal Kumar	2019	

=== Non-film albums ===
Album	Language	Released by	Music director	Year of release
Pratyasha Vol 1,2,3,4	Hindi	Dharmabharathi	Fr. Paul Poovathigal	1994, 1997, 2000, 2006
Sangeetharchana	Malayalam	His Master's Voice (RPG)	Jaya Vijaya	1997
Ayyappamayam	Malayalam	Sargam	Suresh & Suma Varma	1997
Pradakshinam	Malayalam	Audiotracs	Kalyan Anand	1997
Kripa	Malayalam	Johny Sagariga	Jerson Antony	1997
Sangeetha Sangamam	Malayalam	Johny Sagariga	MACTA Live Program	1998
Ninakkayi	Malayalam	East Coast Audios	Balabhaskar	1998
Ponnonam	Malayalam	Sargam Audios	Raveendran	1998
The Golden Voice	Hindi	Maruthi Audios	Cover Versions	1998
Aadyamayi	Malayalam	East Coast Audios	Balabhaskar	2000
Onappeeli	Malayalam	East Coast Audios	Balabhaskar	2000
Ayyappathrippadam	Malayalam	Pranathy Audios	Ravindran Paingodu	2000
Angel	Malayalam	Angel Vision	Johnson, Joy Cheruvathoor, Ouseppachan	2000
Ennennum	Malayalam	Satyam Audios	Manoj George	2001
Jeevan	Malayalam	Grace Communications	Joy Cheruvathoor	2002
Koti Pranaam	Mixed	The Art of Living Foundation International	Himself	2007
Rithubhangi	Malayalam	Manorama Music	Kallara Gopan	2009
Mazhanritham	Malayalam	Highness Video	Himself	2011
