= Chintapalli Ramana =

Indian writer

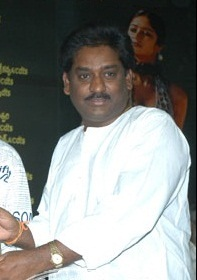
- Chintapalli Ramana.
- Born: Palakollu, Andhra Pradesh, India
- Occupation: Screen Writer
- Years active: 1986–present

Chintapalli Venkata Ramana Babu (born in Palakol, Andhra Pradesh, India) is a Telugu film writer. His screen name is Chintapalli Ramana.

== Personal life ==
Chintapalli Ramana was born in Palakol, West Godavari District, Andhra Pradesh, India. His father, Chintapalli Suryanarayana Reddy, was a stage drama writer and director.

== Career ==
Chintapalli Ramana worked as a dialogue writer for nearly forty films, out of which thirty were super hits. Before entering into the Tollywood, he had written and directed many stage dramas. In the early days of his film career he worked as an associate director with the name Chintapalli Ramanaareddy for many films. He had been introduced as a dialogue writer through the film Chinnabbulu. After that he wrote dialogues for the film Suswagatham. His third film was Tholi Prema, which became a trendsetter in the Telugu film industry.

Chintapalli Ramana worked with Tollywood top directors namely YVS Chowdary, Srinu Vaitla, Puri Jagannadh, V V Vinayak, Bhimaneni Srinivasa Rao, S V Krishna Reddy, A. Karunakaran, Kodi Ramakrishna and many more.

== Filmography ==
=== Filmography as associate director ===
- Konte Kapuram (1986)
- Dabbevariki Chedu (1987)
- Gundamma Gari Krishnulu (1987)
- Thodallullu (1988)
- Bhama Kalapam (1988)
- Poola Rangadu (1989)
- Padmavathi Kalyanam (1990)
- Police Bharya (1990)
- Srivari Chindulu (1991)
- Kobbari Bondam (1991)

=== Filmography as co-writer ===
Release year	Film
1997	Subhakankshalu
1997	Maa Ayana Bangaram
1998	Suryavamsam

=== Filmography as dialogue writer ===
Release year	Film
1995	Chinnabbulu
1998	Suswagatham
1998	Tholi Prema
1998	Suprabhatam
1999	Thammudu
2000	Yuvaraju
2000	Kouravudu
2000	Bachi
2001	Priyamaina Neeku
2001	Anandam
2001	Snehamante Idera
2002	Priya Nestama
2002	Aaduthu Paaduthu
2002	Friends
2002	Lahiri Lahiri Lahirilo
2002	Sontham
2002	Sandade Sandadi
2003	Pellam Oorelithe
2003	Dil
2003	Ottesi Cheputunna
2003	Vasantham
2003	Abhimanyu
2003	Neeke Manasichaanu
2004	Love Today
2004	Andaru Dongale Dorikite
2004	Donga Dongadi
2004	Intlo Srimathi Veedhilo Kumari
2004	Letha Manasulu
2005	Orey Pandu
2006	Devadasu
2006	Boss, I Love You
2006	Raraju
2007	Dubai Seenu
2007	Sunny
2008	Okka Magadu
2008	Ullasamga Utsahamga
2009	Arundhati
2009	Saleem
2010	Namo Venkatesa
2010	Mounaraagam
2011	Maaro
2013	Okkadine
2022	Raajahyogam
