= Farhad Shahnawaz =

Indian model, dancer and actor (born 1980)

- Born: 28 September 1980 (age 45); Hyderabad, Andhra Pradesh, India
- Occupations: Actor, Model

Farhad Shahnawaz (born 28 September 1980) is an Indian model, dancer and actor. He is known for playing the role of Rammy in Sanskaar - Dharohar Apnon Ki, an Indian soap opera that aired on Colors TV. As a dancer, Farhad was the winner of Boogie Woogie (TV series)

== Early life ==
Farhad Shahnawaz was born on 28 September 1980. His father was in the merchant navy. He is the youngest of three siblings.

== Career ==
He has walked the ramp for Lakme Fashion Week from 2004 to 2009. He was the "Show stopper" for Sabyasachi Mukherjee in Lakme Fashion Week in 2008. He has worked with the leading fashion designers of India including Manish Malhotra, Rocky S., Asmita Marwa, Rohit Bal, Sabyasachi Mukherjee, JJ Valaya, Wendell Rodricks, Narendra Kumar, Raghavendra Rathore, Vikram Phadnis, Arjun Khanna, Dev & Neil and Muzafar Ali. He was the brand ambassador for Kalaniketan, Nokia Champions starring Priyanka Chopra and was the face of 'Chi Man' in the United States to name a few.

As a dancer, Farhad Shahnawaz was the winner of Boogie Woogie (TV series). He acts in Sanskaar - Dharohar Apnon Ki, where he plays the role of Rammy.

He made his Telugu cinema debut with the film Relax, which was released in March 2005. His next movie, Style, was released in January 2006, where he played the role of a dance instructor. He is currently acting in a movie called Rey, being directed and produced by Y. V. S. Chowdary, which is due for release in 2014.
