= Jawaan =

2017 Telugu action thriller film by B.V.S.Ravi

- Theatrical release poster
- Directed by: B. V. S. Ravi
- Written by: B. V. S. Ravi; Kalyan Varma Dandu; Sai Krishna; Vamsi Balapanuri
- Produced by: Krishna Kommalapati
- Starring: Sai Dharam Tej; Mehreen Pirzada; Prasanna; Subbaraju
- Cinematography: K. V. Guhan
- Edited by: M. S. Rajashekhar Reddy (S. R. Shekhar)
- Music by: S. Thaman
- Production company: Arunachal Creations
- Release date: 1 December 2017
- Running time: 130 minutes
- Country: India
- Language: Telugu
- Box office: ₹17.4 crore

Jawaan (transl. Soldier) is a 2017 Indian Telugu-language action thriller film directed by B. V. S. Ravi and produced by Krishna Kommalapati, under Arunachal Creations. It stars Sai Dharam Tej and Mehreen Pirzada while Prasanna and Subbaraju play the antagonists. The music was composed by S. Thaman. Jawaan was released worldwide on 1 December 2017.

== Plot ==
Yellapragada Jai is a Rashtriya Swayamsevak Sangh volunteer who wants to serve India by working for DRDO. After giving an interview to DRDO, his selection is put on hold for an indefinite period as another candidate is selected. This is also the time when Jai's childhood friend, Keshava, who is an international criminal based in Hong Kong, plans to get hold of the new missile system which has been developed by DRDO, in Hyderabad. He is on the payroll of foreign enemies working to destroy India. How Jai, with the help of his friends and police, defeats the plans of Keshava by killing him and his henchmen in the climax even at the cost of danger to his family forms the rest of the story.

== Cast ==
- Sai Dharam Tej as Yellapragada Jai
- Mehreen Pirzada as Bhargavi
- Prasanna as Keshava
- Subbaraju as Iqbal
- Jayaprakash as Yellapragada Ramachandra Rao, Jai's father
- Easwari Rao as Yellapragada Lakshmi, Jai's mother
- Kota Srinivasa Rao as Prakash Rao, Jai's uncle
- Surya as Raghavaram, Keshava's father
- Nagendra Babu as Commissioner
- Appaji Ambarisha Darbha as Senior Scientist
- Anish Kuruvilla as a DRDO scientist
- Satyam Rajesh as Rajesh, Jai's friend
- Raj Madiraju as Bhargavi's father
- Madhunandan as Jai's friend
- Karunya Chowdary as Jai's sister
- Sashidhar as Jai's brother
- Revathi as Jai's sister-in-law

== Soundtrack ==
The film's soundtrack was composed by S. Thaman.

Jawaan

Soundtrack album by S.Thaman
- Released: 19 November 2017
- Recorded: 2017
- Genre: Feature film soundtrack
- Length: 20:35
- Label: Mango Music
- Producer: S. Thaman

S.Thaman chronology
Raju Gari Gadhi 2 (2017)	Jawaan (2017)	Golmaal Again (2017)

Traack-List
No.	Title	Lyrics	Singer(s)	Length
1.	"Intiki Okkadu Kavale"	Krishna Kanth	Aditya, Raghuram, Saketh, Sri Krishna	04:13
2.	"Aunanaa Kaadanaa"	Krishna Kanth	Shreya Ghoshal, Thaman S	04:30
3.	"Bangaru"	Bhaskarabhatla Ravi Kumar	Deepu, Raashii Khanna	04:17
4.	"Bugganchuna"	Sri Mani	Sri Krishna, Lipsika	04:02
5.	"Bomma Adirindhi"	Bhaskarabhatla Ravi Kumar	Saketh, Mohana Bhogaraju	03:35
Total length:				20:37

== Production ==
The movie was launched on 30 January 2017 with a formal pooja ceremony. The ceremony was flanked by many from Tollywood. Jr NTR sounded the clapboard, while Koratala Siva switched on the camera and V. V. Vinayak directed the first shot. The Pre-look of the movie was released on 8 June 2017. The prerelease event was conducted on 19 November 2017 in Hyderabad at Peoples Plaza, where audio of the movie was released. Director Koratala Siva and V. V. Vinayak attended as the chief guest.
