= Saleem (film) =

2009 Indian film by Y. V. S. Chowdary

- Directed by: Y. V. S. Chowdary
- Written by: Y. V. S. Chowdary; Chintapalli Ramana
- Produced by: Mohan Babu
- Starring: Vishnu Manchu; Ileana D'Cruz; Mohan Babu
- Cinematography: C. Ramprasad
- Edited by: Kotagiri Venkateswara Rao
- Music by: Sandeep Chowta
- Production company: Sree Lakshmi Prasanna Pictures
- Distributed by: Reliance BIG Pictures
- Release date: 12 December 2009
- Running time: 164 minutes
- Country: India
- Language: Telugu

Saleem is a 2009 Indian Telugu-language romantic action comedy film directed by YVS Chowdary (of Devadasu fame). The film was released on 12 December 2009. Starring Vishnu Manchu, Ileana D'Cruz and Mohan Babu in the lead roles. This was an utter flop film at box office.

== Plot ==
The story begins with Saleem (Vishnu Manchu) beating up baddies in a village to save his love interest Satya (Ileana). In a flashback he is shown to be the world's most wanted gangster. He is wanted in Mexico, Switzerland and Miami. In all these places he is shown to be a big gangster. The reason why he went after Ileana makes up the rest of the story.

== Cast ==
- Manchu Vishnu as Saleem / Munna
- Ileana D'Cruz as Satyavati "Satya"
- Mohan Babu as Ogirala Jogaiah "Ozo"
- Venkat as Krish
- Mukesh Rishi as Appala Naidu
- Ali as Gafar Khan
- Ravi Mariya as Natakula Venkata Bharadwaj
- Jeeva as Appala Naidu's henchman
- Raghu Babu as Janaki, Ojo's henchman
- Napoleon as Singamanaidu, Satyavati's father
- Kaveri Jha as English teacher
- Banerjee as Appala Naidu's henchman
- Brahmanandam as Raj Chauhan
- Tanikella Bharani as Satyavati's relative
- Prudhviraj as Satyavati's relative
- Jaya Prakash Reddy as Satyavati's relative
- Hema as Satyavati's relative
- Pragathi as Satyavati's mother
- Sivannarayana Naripeddi as Satyavati's relative
- Bharath Reddy as Satyavati's fake groom
- Giri Babu as Singamanaidu's friend
- Master Bharath as Laddu
- M S Narayana as Satyavati's relative
- Telangana Shakuntala as Nookamma
- Ramya Sri as Appala Naidu's wife
- Giridhar as Satyavati's relative
- Amit Jha

== Soundtrack ==
Saleem

Soundtrack album by Sandeep Chowtha
- Released: 11 November 2009
- Genre: Film soundtrack
- Label: Sony BMG
- Producer: Sandeep Chowta

Sandeep Chowtha chronology
| Josh (2009) | Saleem (2009) | Kedi (2010) |

The soundtrack has music composed by Sandeep Chowtha, with lyrics by Chandrabose. The music was released on 11 November 2009.

Track list
| No. | Title | Artist(s) | Length |
|---|---|---|---|
| 1. | "Mama Mia" | Shefali Alvares | 05:31 |
| 2. | "Baby Baby" | Megha Girish | 05:19 |
| 3. | "I Wanna Talk to You" | Nikita Nigam | 06:10 |
| 4. | "Kalti Kalti" | Sandeep Chowtha, Chandrabose | 05:38 |
| 5. | "Lite Le Lo" | Sanjeev Wadhwani, Nikita Nigam | 05:11 |
| 6. | "Freak Out" | Amey Date, Geetha Madhuri | 05:18 |
| 7. | "Swargam Narakam" | Nikita Nigam, Sowmya Raoh | 02:19 |
| 8. | "Poolu Gusa Gusa" | Pradip Somasundaran, Sonu Kakkar | 05:29 |
