= Wild Dog (film) =

2021 film by Ahishor Solomon

- Theatrical release poster
- Directed by: Ahishor Solomon
- Written by: Ahishor Solomon
- Produced by: S. Niranjan Reddy; K. Anvesh Reddy
- Starring: Nagarjuna Akkineni; Bilal Hossein; Dia Mirza; Saiyami Kher; Atul Kulkarni
- Cinematography: Shaneil Deo
- Edited by: Shravan Katikaneni
- Music by: S. Thaman
- Production company: Matinee Entertainment
- Release date: 2 April 2021
- Running time: 127 minutes
- Country: India
- Language: Telugu
- Budget: ₹6 crore
- Box office: est. ₹7 crore

Wild Dog is a 2021 Indian Telugu-language action thriller film written and directed by debutant Ahishor Solomon. Produced by Matinee Entertainment, the film stars Nagarjuna, Bilall Hossein, Dia Mirza, Saiyami Kher, and Atul Kulkarni. The film includes many terrorist incidents in India, including the Gokul Chat bomb blast in 2007 and the capture of Yasin Bhatkal. Wild Dog released theatrically on 2 April 2021 to positive reviews.

== Plot ==
On 13 February 2010 at John's Bakery in Pune, a bomb explosion claims many innocent lives. Two weeks later, the Ministry of Home Affairs hands over the case to the National Investigation Agency, and its top officer Vijay Varma, also known as Wild Dog, is reenlisted by his senior friend DGP Hemanth. Through a series of investigations, Vijay and his team come across the CCTV footage of a man entering the bakery with a bag and exiting without it. Further, with the help of a survivor's testimony, they are able to create a sketch of the culprit. On the other hand, Hemanth explains to Vijay about a two-week older incident involving killings of two cops inside a truck at the Andhra–Tamil Nadu border, three days before which he had received a tip-off from the Intelligence Bureau about 50 kilograms of RDX being transported at the border. As the culprit's sketch is circulated everywhere, a shop owner quickly recognizes the suspect and explains to the cops that he let the suspect live in his house on the recommendation of a man named Mirza Baig. Vijay and his team manage to nab Baig and torture him into revealing the culprit's name: Khalid, who bombed the bakery, and his accomplice, Khatil who was supposed to blow up the Dagdusheth Temple but could not, given the tight security at the temple due to a VIP's visit.

Vijay orders a search for Khalid and sends his teammate Ali Reza undercover in prison where one of Khalid's allies, Mohammed Peerbuoy, instructs Ali to visit a library named Darul-ul-Islam in Darbhanga, Bihar under his recommendation. Through further investigating, Vijay reveals the culprit to be Khalid Bhatkal, a member of the Indian Mujahideen. On the other hand, Khalid targets Indian Premier League and enlists Khatil for the job. However, Khatil is nabbed by Vijay's team in Bihar while visiting his ailing son and provides them with Indian Mujahideen's details in exchange for his son's treatment. With his help, police nab several suspects. Asadullah, the librarian, enlists Ali to meet with a special person at Mumbai, and learning of this, Vijay believes him to be Khalid himself. In Mumbai, Khalid instructs Ali through a phone call while watching him. Vijay also keeps an eye on the movements and is about to nab Khalid as the latter prepares to meet Ali inside a taxi, but the mission is foiled by the Mumbai ATS who were following Ali due to a tip-off from the Bihar intelligence. Enraged, Vijay slaps one of the cops and is suspended from the mission. However, he continues working unofficially and through Arya, a source in Nepal, learns Khalid is hiding there. He asks for Hemanth's help, but the ministry turns them down. Vijay finally flees to Nepal along with his team to execute the covert "Operation Wild Dog".

At the rendezvous point, they are attacked by armed men, before Arya arrives and helps them fight off the attackers. Hemanth is suspected for blowing their cover since he was the only one aware of the mission. Laxman, a senior inspector at Nepal Intelligence, reveals they were attacked by the henchmen of a don named Bomzan, who is ambushed and reveals he was ordered to kill them by Abdullah, an MP working for the ISI. Vijay executes Bomzan before ordering him to lie to Abdullah about killing them. Vijay and his team fail to capture Khalid at the wedding of Abdullah's son but later succeed following a shootout with the Maoists guarding him. Laxman betrays them by revealing to Abdullah their escape in an ambulance, but Vijay improvises the route. Khalid awakens and attacks Vijay, who overpowers him as the ambulance reaches the border. Two of Vijay's teammates disguised as Indian Embassy officials request the ambulance's entry for a "VIP's operation". Vijay's defibrillation experiment involving Khalid works and seeing his life in danger, the ambulance is allowed to pass through the borders. It is further revealed that Vijay secretly texted Hemanth about a traitor in the agency and it was discovered to be Hemanth's friend Vinod, who was assisting with the operation. Vijay hands over Khalid to Hemanth and salutes the tricolor along with his team.

== Cast ==
- Nagarjuna Akkineni as NIA agent Vijay Varma alias "Wild Dog"
- Dia Mirza as Priya Varma
- Saiyami Kher as Arya Pandit, NIA agent
- Atul Kulkarni as DIG Hemanth
- Bilal Hossein as Khalid Batkal (based on Yasin Bhatkal)
- Ali Reza as Ali Reza, NIA agent
- Rahul Singh as Nawaz
- Mayank Parakh as Caleb Matthews, NIA agent
- Rudra Pradeep as Hashwanth Manohar, NIA agent
- Prakash Sudarshan as Rudra Goud, NIA agent
- Anish Kuruvilla as Vinod
- Shivam Malhotra as Saajid
- K. C Shankar as Laxman
- Kumer Kakon Uzzal as Zan
- Shawar Ali as Bomzan
- Avijit Dutt as Abdullah
- Aziz Naser as Car Driver

== Production ==
=== Development ===
The film was announced in December 2019. Based on true events, Nagarjuna Akkineni is cast as a National Investigation Agency officer with Saiyami Kher in pivotal role. S. Thaman has composed the film's score.

=== Filming ===
The filming took place in Hyderabad and Goa for 20 days and a schedule was planned in Thailand. Nearly 70% of the shoot was complete by February 2020, before being halted due to COVID-19 pandemic in India. The shooting is resumed in September 2020. After filming crucial sequences in Leh, Manali and Jammu the production was wrapped up in November 2020.

== Release ==
The film was originally reported to release as a Netflix Original film. However, in March 2021 the producers and team of Wild Dog announced that they have withdrawn the digital deal with Netflix in order to opt for a theatrical release. The date later on was announced as 2 April 2021 by Niranjan Reddy at the press meet.

=== Home media ===
The film's digital rights were sold to Netflix. The film's digital premiere took place on Netflix on 22 April 2021, after 20 days of its theatrical run in Telugu along with dubbed versions in Kannada, Malayalam, and Tamil languages.

== Reception ==
On the review aggregator website Rotten Tomatoes, 40% of 5 critics' reviews are positive, with an average rating of 5/10.

Neeshitha Nyayapati of The Times of India rated the film 3 stars of 5 and wrote, "Wild Dog is a simple story that doesn’t veer much beyond the tale of a team looking to nab a terrorist. Ahishor Solomon must be lauded for attempting to make an action film that’s devoid of any commercial elements." The Hindu critic Sangeeth Devi Dundoo felt that with more attention writing in the first hour, Wild Dog could have raised the bar higher. On technical aspects, she wrote, "The film benefits from its able technical crew and special mentions are due to action director David Ismalone, cinematographer Shaneil Deo and Thaman for his background score."

In his review for Firstpost, Hemanth Kumar gave the film 3/5 and stated: "Despite its packaging and pace, Wild Dog presents an overwhelming sense of familiarity in terms of characters and their motivations, leaving not much room for surprises." A reviewer from The Hans India appreciated the approach to this story which did not deviate with unnecessary commercial elements. However, they opined that the screenplay could have been tighter.

The Indian Express journalist Manoj Kumar R stated that Wild Dog feels "more or less it feels like a television film." He added, "Solomon’s writing is the saving grace of the film. His no-frills approach works but only to an extent."
