= Charminar (2003 film) =

2003 Telugu language film

- DVD cover
- Directed by: Sagar
- Written by: Vinay (dialogues)
- Screenplay by: Sagar
- Produced by: B. R. Naidu; Srinivasa Rao Dommalapati (presents)
- Starring: Venkat; Abhirami; Prakash Raj; Telangana Shakuntala
- Cinematography: G. Srinivas
- Music by: Ghantadi Krishna
- Production company: Sri Kali Creations
- Release date: 15 August 2003
- Country: India
- Language: Telugu

Charminar is a 2003 Indian Telugu-language directed by Sagar. The film stars Venkat, Abhirami, Prakash Raj and Telangana Shakuntala. It was theatrically released on 15 August 2003. The film is a remake of the Kannada film Majestic (2002).

== Cast ==
- Venkat as Nandu
- Abhirami as Keerthi
- Prakash Raj as Surendra Babu
- Telangana Shakuntala as Lakshmibayamma
- Jeeva as Krishnamurthy
- Surya as Gowd
- L. B. Sriram
- Raghu Babu
- Bhuvaneswari
- Srinivas
- Sarika Ramachandra Rao
- Lakshmipati
- Sony
- Kaushal Manda
- Master Manoj as young Nandu

== Reception ==
=== Critical response ===
Gudipoodi Srihari from The Hindu wrote "Venkat's good physique and histrionic talent are wasted in this thankless role. Even Prakashraj gets an equally bad role. None of the artistes fares better. Music score by Ghantadi Krishna sounds melancholic in this mayhem called Charminar". A reviewer of idlebrain.com says "This film does not offer anything but for a couple of well picturised melodious songs. You can safely avoid watching this film". A reviewer of Sify wrote "it seems was not paid his full remuneration and hence he decided not to dub. Abhirami (the heroine of Kamal’s Sandiyar) is good as Keerthi. On the whole it is a shoddily made film, and watching it is a waste of time".
