= Sri Sita Ramula Kalyanam Chootamu Raarandi =

- DVD cover
- Directed by: Y. V. S. Chowdary
- Written by: Jandhyala (dialogues)
- Screenplay by: Y. V. S. Chowdary
- Story by: Y. V. S. Chowdary
- Produced by: Nagarjuna Akkineni
- Starring: Akkineni Nageswara Rao; Venkat; Chandni
- Cinematography: K. Rajendra Prasad
- Edited by: Shankar
- Music by: M. M. Keeravani
- Production company: Great India Entertainments
- Release date: 26 June 1998
- Running time: 149 minutes
- Country: India
- Language: Telugu

Sri Sita Ramula Kalyanam Chootamu Raarandi (transl. Come on! Let's watch the marriage of Sita and Rama) is a 1998 Indian Telugu-language romance family drama film, produced by Nagarjuna Akkineni under the Great India Entertainments banner and directed by debutant Y. V. S. Chowdary. It stars Akkineni Nageswara Rao, Venkat (in his debut), and Chandni. The music was composed by M. M. Keeravani. The film was a box office success.

== Cast ==
- Akkineni Nageswara Rao as Ramachandra Raju
- Venkat as Raju
- Chandni as Madhavi
- Chandra Mohan as Chandram
- Ahuti Prasad as Raghu
- Murali Mohan as Mohan Rao
- Chalapathi Rao as Qasim
- Banerjee as Venu
- Chandu as Krishna
- Sivaji as Sivaji
- Kamal as Kamal
- Radha Krishna as Radha
- Vinayak as Kishore
- Venniradai Nirmala as Bhavani
- Rama Prabha as Begum
- Kalpana as Rajyalakshmi
- Priya as Priya
- Krishna Sri as Mahalakshmi
- Neelima Sudha as Lavanya
- Rajeswari as Sujatha
- Durga as Sribajith
- Baby Niharika as Rajyam

== Production ==
Producer Nagarjuna supported director Y. V. S. Chowdary's decision to make a film with newcomers and new face Venkat was cast.

== Soundtrack ==
Sri Sita Ramula Kalyanam Chootamu Raarandi

Soundtrack album by M. M. Keeravani
- Released: 1998
- Recorded: 1998
- Genre: Soundtrack
- Length: 37:50
- Label: Aditya Music
- Producer: M. M. Keeravani

M. M. Keeravani chronology
Pelli Kanuka (1998)	Sri Sita Ramula Kalyanam Chootamu Raarandi (1998)	Seetharama Raju (1999)

The music was composed by M. M. Keeravani. Lyrics were written by Sirivennela Sitarama Sastry. Music was released on ADITYA Music Company.

No.	Title	Singer(s)	Length
1.	"Evamma Vainamemamma"	S. P. Balasubrahmanyam, Chitra, Sunitha	4:07
2.	"O Prema"	S. P. Balasubrahmanyam, Sunitha	4:59
3.	"E Desamegina"	Suresh Peters	4:43
4.	"Ramayana Saaram"	Sunitha	1:08
5.	"Nee Oohallo"	M. M. Keeravani, Suresh Peter, Sunitha	2:43
6.	"Banturethi Koluvu"	S. P. Balasubrahmanyam	3:59
7.	"Om Ani"	S. P. Balasubrahmanyam, Sunitha	5:04
8.	"Hai Rabba"	Chitra, Radhika	5:04
9.	"Evamma Computeramma"	Mano, M. M. Keeravani, Sujatha, Sunitha	4:21
10.	"Story Theme"	Instrumental	1:14
11.	"Shuklam Baradharam"	Chitra, Sunitha	1:04
Total length:			37:50

== Reception ==
A critic from Andhra Today wrote, "By his sheer skill, the debutante director turned a mediocre story into an appealing movie. The excellent songs and the rich locations are special attractions, while photography by Aravind is impressive. The slow pace in the first half picks up momentum".
