= Annayya (2000 film) =

2000 film by Muthyala Subbaiah

- Film poster
- Directed by: Muthyala Subbaiah
- Screenplay by: Muthyala Subbaiah; Bhoopathi Raja; Satyanand (dialogues)
- Story by: Bhoopathi Raja
- Produced by: K. Venkateswara Rao
- Starring: Chiranjeevi; Soundarya; Venkat; Ravi Teja; Chandni; Sishwa; Priya; Kota Srinivasa Rao
- Cinematography: Chota K. Naidu
- Edited by: A. Sreekar Prasad
- Music by: Mani Sharma
- Production company: Sri Sai Ram Arts
- Distributed by: Geetha Arts
- Release date: 7 January 2000
- Running time: 157 mins
- Country: India
- Language: Telugu

Annayya (transl. Elder brother) is a 2000 Indian Telugu-language film directed by Muthyala Subbaiah who also co-wrote the screenplay with Bhupati Raja and Satyanand. The film stars Chiranjeevi, Soundarya, Venkat, Ravi Teja, Chandni, Sishwa, Priya and Kota Srinivasa Rao. It has music composed by Mani Sharma with cinematography by Chota K. Naidu. It was released on 7 January 2000.

The film won three state Nandi Awards. It was later dubbed into Tamil as Moothavan.

== Plot ==
Rajaram, owner of a fleet of lorries, meets Devi, a garment factory owner. After that acquaintance, she once sought his help in dealing with two street ruffians who were teasing her sisters, Latha and Geetha, and was shocked when the culprits turned out to be his brothers, Ravi and Gopi. Rajaram takes the incident lightly, considering it a prank by youngsters, and is very lenient with them. With more such incidents, the two fall in love, with the brothers and sisters not far behind.

At his brothers' request, Rajaram approaches Devi to ask for her sisters' hands in marriage for his brothers. But she curtly refuses, citing that the two are wayward drunkards. Rajaram reacts sharply and vows to have his brothers marry her sisters.

Since then, he has been more exacting with his brothers and has brought about a transformation in them. Devi agrees to their marriage. But the incorrigible brothers come in an inebriated condition for their engagement, and Rajaram faces the brunt of Devi's ire. She insults him and leaves with her sisters. An outraged Rajaram kicks his brothers out of the home.

The two brothers, being state rank holders in engineering, find favor with a businessman, Rangarao, who employs them. Rajaram, who is genuinely fond of his brothers, sells away his property and gives money secretly to Rangarao, paving the way for a partnership deal between Rangarao and his brothers. Piqued at being kicked out of home, his brothers, unaware of his hand in securing the partnership for them, nurse a grudge against their brother and insult Rajaram in Devi's presence. She, being in the know, slaps them and opens their eyes by informing them of his sacrifice. This brings about a total change in them, and the repentant duo go to Rangarao to restore the property to their brother.

Rangarao has other plans and tries to have them killed with goons. The brothers escape death and land in a hospital with injuries. A furious Rajaram goes to Rangarao, who reveals his real identity. Rangarao is the brother of Chinna Rao, a criminal who was caught in the police dragnet with Rajaram's help and later died. This is Rangarao's vendetta. In the ensuing melee, Rangarao is killed. Rajaram and his brothers reunite.

The film ends with all three brothers getting married: Rajaram with Devi, Ravi with Latha, and Gopi with Geetha.

== Cast ==
- Chiranjeevi as Rajaram (Aathmaram in hallucination)
  - Dilip Kumar Salvadi as young Rajaram
- Soundarya as Gajjala Kanaka Maha Lakshmi Devi
- Venkat as Gopi, Rajaram’s youngest brother
- Ravi Teja as Ravi, Rajaram’s younger brother
- Chandni as Latha, Devi’s younger sister
- Sishwa as Geeta, Devi’s youngest sister
- Priya as Priya, Devi’s friend
- Kota Srinivasa Rao as Babai, Rajaram’s uncle
- Sarath Babu as Rangarao
- Bhupinder Singh as Chinna Rao, Rangarao’s brother
- Uttej as Raju, Rajaram’s assistant
- M. S. Narayana as police officer
- Hema as Devi’s mother
- Surya as Devi’s father
- Raja Ravindra as Ravi and Gopi’s friend
- Gangadhar Panday as Personal secretary
- Simran in an item song

== Production ==
Vineeth was originally selected to portray as one of Chiranjeevi's younger brothers. Chakravarthy was also part of this project however he left the film and they were replaced by Ravi Teja and Venkat. Two songs were shot in Switzerland.

== Soundtrack ==
Annayya

Soundtrack album by Mani Sharma
- Released: 2000
- Recorded: 1999–2000
- Genre: Film soundtrack
- Length: 24:38
- Label: Sabdaalaya Audio
- Producer: Mani Sharma

Mani Sharma chronology
Yuvakudu (2000)	Annayya (2000)	Azad (2000)

Mani Sharma composed the songs, while Veturi, Bhuvanachandra, Jonnavittula and Vennelakanti penned the lyrics. The track "Hima Seemallo", sung by Hariharan and Harini won the Nandi Award for Best Playback Singer, Male for Hariharan.

=== Telugu tracklist ===
Annayya (Telugu Version)

Song title	Singers	Lyricist
"Sayyare Sayya"	S. P. Balasubrahmanyam, Sukhwinder Singh (Chorus-Uncredited)	Vennelakanti
"Hima Seemallo"	Hariharan, Harini	Veturi
"Gusagusale"	Udit Narayan, Sujatha Mohan	Veturi
"Vana Vallappa"	Hariharan, Sujatha Mohan	Veturi
"Baava Chandamaamalu"	S. P. Balasubrahmanyam, Chitra, S. P. B. Charan, Teja	Jonnavittula
"Aata Kaavala"	Sukhwinder Singh, Radhika, Devi Sri Prasad	Bhuvanachandra

=== Tamil Tracklist ===
Moothavan (Tamil Version)

No.	Title	Lyrics	Artist(s)	Length
1.	"Auto Venuma"	Kadhal Mathi	Mano, Anuradha Sriram
2.	"Ayyare"	Muthulingham	Mano
3.	"Imayam"	Muthulingham	P. Unnikrishnan, Harini
4.	"Kadhal"	Kadhal Mathi	P. Unnikrishnan, Harini
5.	"Kusu Kusunnu"	Muthulingham	M. M. Srilekha, Ravi Sankar
6.	"Maama"	Muthulingham	Mano, M. M. Srilekha, Ravi Sankar

== Reception ==
Deccan Herald wrote "Though packed with good intentions and a top flight performance by Chiranjeevi and Soundarya, the film buckles under a cliched plot and a narrative which lacks coherence. Nevertheless, Annayya, in which the brother sentiment is beaten to pulp, is quite good for family viewing". Idlebrain wrote "Muthyala Subbaiah's mark of sentiment is missing. He seems to have got carried away by projecting the charisma of Chiranjeevi and there by concentrating less on sensible narration of story. There is no heavy sentiment in this film". Andhra Today wrote "Muthyala Subbaiah, who gave Chiranjeevi a hit movie with "Hitler" by exploiting sisterly sentiment, has done it again, this time with brotherly sentiment. Already equipped with all the trappings necessary to impress the masses, the movie has a light entertaining comedy track, catering to all tastes and is sure to be a hit with the audience".

== Box office ==
The film had collected a distributors' share of Rs.11 crores. It completed 50 days in 92 centres and 100 days in 60 centres.

== Awards ==
Nandi awards 2000

- Best Male Playback Singer - Hariharan for "Hima Seemallo" - won
- Best Choreographer - Raghava Lawrence for "Aata Kaavala" - won
- Best Fight Master - Kanal Kannan - won
