= Rafta Rafta – The Speed =

Indian romantic drama film

- Directed by: Raj Sharma
- Written by: Nawab Arzoo
- Produced by: Madhusudhan D. Mehta
- Starring: Sameer Dharmadhikari; Viraaj Kumar; Urmila Rao; Monica Castelino; Rahul Roy
- Cinematography: Damodar Naidu
- Edited by: Keshav Naidu
- Music by: Sen Brothers
- Production company: Raj Dhairya Entertainment
- Release date: 17 February 2006
- Country: India
- Language: Hindi
- Budget: ₹3 crore

Rafta Rafta – The Speed is a 2006 Hindi-language romantic drama film directed by Raj Sharma starring Sameer Dharmadhikari, Viraaj Kumar, Urmila Rao, Monica Castelino and Rahul Roy with Jawed Sheikh and Shakti Kapoor in supporting roles.

The film was released to negative reviews although the music was well received. The film, however, was a commercial failure.

== Cast ==
- Sameer Dharmadhikari as Rahul
- Viraaj Kumar as Akshay
- Monica Castelino as Neha
- Urmila Rao as Shilpa
- Rahul Roy as Spencer
- Jawed Sheikh as Shilpa's brother
- Shakti Kapoor as Johny
- Shahbaz Khan as Ponty Chaddha
- Sheetal Bedi as Candy Kaur
- Shakti Singh as Harish
- Pushpa Verma as Gayetri
- Brownie
- Shaukat Ali
- Heena Rajput as Mrs. B. Garewal
- Asha Sachdev as Parminder Kaur
- Mumaith Khan (item number in "Sachmuch Badi Ho Gayi")

== Production ==
The film was shot in London. The film was stuck in production for one-and-a-half years.

== Soundtrack ==
Rafta Rafta – The Speed

Soundtrack album by Sen Brothers
- Released: 6 December 2005
- Genre: Feature film soundtrack
- Length: 31:22
- Language: Hindi
- Label: Venus Music

The music was composed by the Sen Brothers with lyrics by Nawab Arzoo. In a music review, a critic from The Tribune wrote that "Sometimes small films manage to surprise one with the quality of their music. This is one such" and called the title song rendered by Udit Narayan and Shreya Ghoshal as the pick of the album.

Track listing
No.	Title	Singer(s)	Length
1.	"Rafta Rafta Tumse Pyar Ho"	Udit Narayan, Shreya Ghoshal	4:47
2.	"Lagi Lagan"	Keerthi Sagathia	10:44
3.	"Pyar Mohabbat Romance"	Kunal Ganjawala, Madan	5:08
4.	"Main Such Much Badi Ho Gayi"	Sonu Kakkar	4:53
5.	"Mukhtasar Si Ek Hasi"	Abhijeet	5:48
Total length:			31:22

== Reception ==
A critic from Bollywood Hungama wrote that "On the whole, RAFTA RAFTA - THE SPEED is a dull fare".

== Box office ==
The film earned ₹44, 683 in its first week.
