= S. Niranjan Reddy =

Indian Producer and politician

Sirgapoor Niranjan Reddy
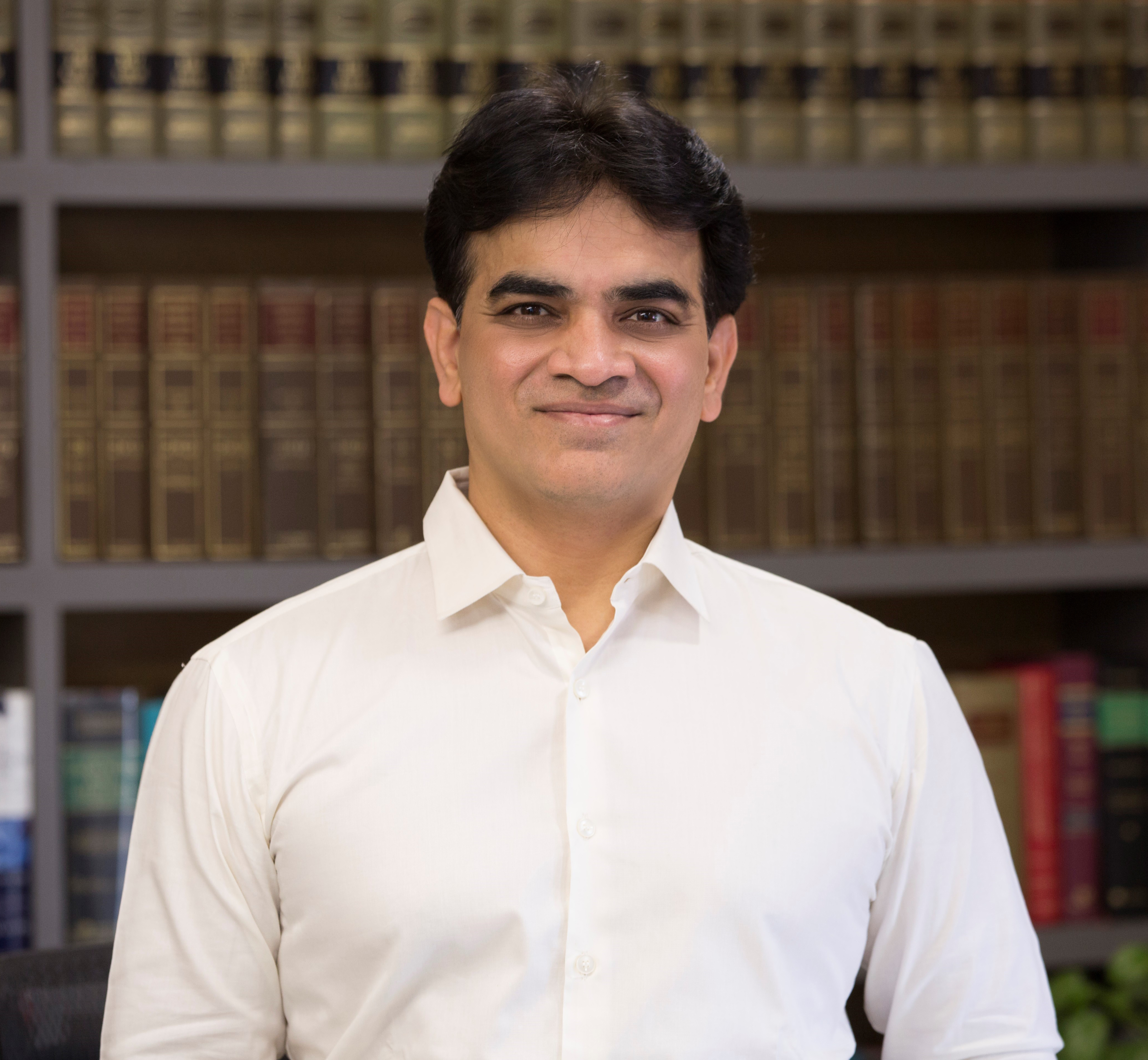
- Reddy in 2022

Member of Parliament, Rajya Sabha
- Incumbent
- Assumed office 22 June 2022
- Preceded by: Y. S. Chowdary
- Constituency: Andhra Pradesh

Personal details
- Born: Sirgapoor Niranjan Reddy; 22 July 1970 (age 56) Nirmal, Andhra Pradesh (present–day Telangana), India
- Party: YSR Congress Party
- Children: 2
- Education: Symbiosis Law School, Pune
- Occupation: Lawyer, producer, politician

Sirgapoor Niranjan Reddy (born 22 July 1970) is an Indian lawyer, practicing in Supreme Court of India and National Company Law Appellate Tribunal. He is a Member of Parliament in Rajya Sabha representing the State of Andhra Pradesh since 2022. He is also known for maintaining diverse interests and is popularly recognized for having produced the Telugu films, Kshanam (2016), Ghazi (2017), Wild Dog (2021), and Acharya (2022).

== Early life ==
Niranjan Reddy was born on 22 July 1970 in Nirmal, Adilabad district, Telangana. His father, Vidya Sagar Reddy, was a well- known lawyer in the said region. He did his early schooling from a rural convent school in Kisan Nagar of Nizamabad district and then shifted to Hyderabad for his secondary and higher education. He studied and completed his schooling from Siva Sivani Public School in 1987. He thereafter pursued a 5 year Integrated Law Course from Symbiosis Law School in Pune and graduated in 1992.

== Career ==
=== Legal ===
After completing his LLB in 1992, he joined the legal practice of the erstwhile senior advocates O. Manohar Reddy and K. Pratap Reddy, in the Andhra Pradesh High Court. He also worked briefly in the Supreme Court of India, in 1994-95, with Justice Muralidhar.

He started his independent practice as a lawyer in 1995 in Hyderabad. He had extensive practice across all courts/fora in Hyderabad. He was particularly sought after in commercial, criminal, and arbitration matters. He was the standing counsel for the Election Commission of India and Medical Council of India. He was designated as a Senior Advocate in the year 2016. He has since shifted to and is currently practising in the Supreme Court, New Delhi. He also represented various corporate groups and worked as the lawyer for Y. S. Jagan Mohan Reddy in the CBI/PMLA Cases. When film star Allu Arjun needed legal assistance in the Sandhya Theatre stampede case, he sought the help of Mr Reddy, a distinguished lawyer who also has deep insights into the film industry. As a practising advocate before the Supreme Court of India, he has represented several high-profile and sensitive matters from the Telugu states of Andhra Pradesh and Telangana, as well as leading corporates across the country, earning recognition as one of the leading advocate at the Supreme Court of India.

=== Political ===
In 2022, he was elected as an MP from Andhra Pradesh to the Rajya Sabha, from YSRCP.

He is currently serving as a Member of Rajya Sabha Standing Committee of Housing and Urban Affairs. He is also a member of the Rajya Sabha Committee on Subordinate Legislation. He is a member of the Hindi Salahkar Samiti of Ministry of Jal Shakti. He is also a member of the Consultative Committee of Ministry of Law and Justice, Union of India.

He was a member of the Joint Parliamentary Committee constituted on The Multi-State Co-operative Societies Amendment Bill, 2022.

=== Film ===
He maintains an abiding interest in the creative aspects of film making. He had worked as an assistant director to Ram Gopal Varma. He is also credited with writing the screenplay for Ghazi (2012).

He has produced several films including Gaganam (2011), Kshanam (2016), Ghazi, Wild Dog (2021), and Acharya (2022).

=== Other interests ===
Reddy maintains a healthy interest in Arts and Films. He is the Founder Trustee of Art @ Telangana, an Art Foundation, that was formed prior to the bifurcation of the State of Andhra Pradesh to promote the cultural ethos of Telangana region.

He is an avid nature enthusiast and pursues environmental issues.
