= Pilla Nuvvu Leni Jeevitham =

Pilla Nuvvu Leni Jeevihtam
- Movie Poster
- Directed by: A. S. Ravi Kumar Chowdary
- Written by: A. S. Ravi Kumar Chowdary
- Produced by: Bunny Vas; Harshith Reddy
- Starring: Sai Durgha Tej; Regina Cassandra
- Cinematography: Dasaradhi Sivendra
- Edited by: Gautham Raju
- Music by: Anoop Rubens
- Production companies: Geetha Arts and Sri Venkateswara Creations
- Release date: 14 November 2014
- Running time: 132 minutes
- Country: India
- Language: Telugu
- Box office: ₹11 crore distributors' share

Pilla Nuvvu Leni Jeevitam (transl. Girl, Life Without You) is a 2014 Telugu romantic action comedy film directed by A. S. Ravi Kumar Chowdary and jointly produced by Bunny Vasu and Harishith Reddy, under Geetha Arts and Sri Venkateswara Creations. The film stars Sai Durgha Tej and Regina Cassandra, while Jagapathi Babu and Prakash Raj play supporting roles. music was composed by Anoop Rubens. The film is the first release of Sai Dharam Tej as the lead actor. The title was taken from a song of the film Gabbar Singh. The film opened to positive to mixed reviews from critics and was a hit at the box office.

Sai Durgha Tej's debut was Rey, produced and directed, by YVS Chowdary on his Bommarillu films banner. The film was launched at Ramanaidu Studios in Hyderabad on 17 October 2010 on the eve of Vijayadasami. The filming ended on 6 August 2013. Rey had been delayed due to financial issues and it was released on 20 January 2014. Sai Dharam Tej won SIIMA Award for Best Male Debut (Telugu) at 4th SIIMA and Best Debut Actor Award at the 13th Santosham Film Awards.

== Plot ==
Srinu is an engineering student who discovers that his girlfriend Siri is in danger from the CM aspirant Prabhakar as Siri is Prabhakar's illegitimate daughter. Prabhakar hires a contract killer named Maisamma to finish off Siri, but Srinu plays a cat-and-mouse game and finally exposes Prabhakar's misdeeds through a journalist named Shafi. In the aftermath, Maisamma retires from the underworld and becomes an auto driver, while Srinu and Siri get married.

== Cast ==
- Sai Durgha Tej as Srinu
- Regina Cassandra as Shailaja (Shailu) / Sirisha (Siri)
- Jagapathi Babu as Maisamma
- Brahmanandam as Nandagopal
- Prakash Raj as Prabhakar
- Raghu Babu as Yadigiri
- Sayaji Shinde as Ganga Prasad
- Giri Babu as Rama Chandra Murthy
- Chandra Mohan as Chandram
- Prabhakar as Maisamma's henchman
- Ahuti Prasad as S.P.
- Jaya Prakash Reddy as J.P.
- Surya as orphanage manager
- Vizag Prasad as MLA
- Shankar Melkote as Principal
- Shafi as Shafi, investigative journalist
- Prudhvi Raj as MLA
- Prabhu as the police inspector
- Prabhas Sreenu as Delhi
- Venu Gopal as Maisamma's henchman
- Satyam Rajesh
- Thagubothu Ramesh
- Ambati Srinivas
- Kishore Das as anchor
- Duvvasi Mohan as movier
- Gundu Sudharshan as Prabhakar's assistant
- Hema as Hema
- Surekha Vani as Surekha
- Rajitha as Chandra Mohan's wife
- Y. Kasi Viswanath as Hema's husband
- Satya Krishnan as Satya
- Priya as Parvati
- Suresh as G. Suresh
- Subhashini as a hostel warden

== Soundtrack ==
Pilla Nuvvu Leni Jeevitam

Soundtrack album by Anup Rubens
- Released: 25 October 2013
- Recorded: 2013
- Genre: Film soundtrack
- Length: 17:42
- Label: Aditya Music
- Producer: Anoop Rubens

Anup Rubens chronology
Khushi Khushiyagi (Kannada) (2012)	Pilla Nuvvu Leni Jeevitam (2013)	Manam (2014)

Music composed by Anup Rubens. The soundtrack of the film was released worldwide on 25 October 2013 on Aditya Music Company.

Tracklist
No.	Title	Lyrics	Singer(s)	Length
1.	"Dilse"	Sri Mani	Rahul Nambiar, Megha Raj	3:43
2.	"Pilla Nuvvu Leni Jeevitham"	Bhaskarabhatla Ravi Kumar	Anudeep Dev, Rahul Nambiar	3:54
3.	"Aa Roje Tholisari"	Sirivennela Sitarama Sastry	Sri Rama Chandra	4:00
4.	"Neeli Neeli Kalladana"	Bhaskarabhatla Ravi Kumar	Rupam Islam	3:04
5.	"Atoo Itoo Etoo"	Suddala Ashok Teja	M. L. R. Karthikeyan	2:41
Total length:				17:42

== Reception ==
The satellite rights of the film were acquired by MAA TV. The film opened to mixed reviews.

== Box office ==
The film opened good response all over the world by collecting ₹2.32 crore (US$240,000)(Share) on its first day. The film collected ₹7.85 crore (US$820,000) (Share) in its first week. The film ended by collecting ₹10.75 crore (US$1.1 million) worldwide.
