= Subramanyam for Sale =

Subramanyam For Sale
- Theatrical poster
- Directed by: Harish Shankar
- Screenplay by: Ramesh Reddy; Satish Vegesna
- Story by: Harish Shankar
- Produced by: Dil Raju
- Starring: Sai Durgha Tej; Regina Cassandra; Adah Sharma
- Cinematography: C. Ramprasad
- Edited by: Gautham Raju
- Music by: Mickey J Meyer
- Production company: Sri Venkateswara Creations
- Release date: 24 September 2015
- Running time: 152 minutes
- Country: India
- Language: Telugu
- Box office: est. ₹33.95 crore

Subramanyam For Sale is a 2015 Telugu-language romantic action comedy film written and directed by Harish Shankar, produced by Dil Raju on Sri Venkateswara Creations banner. The film stars Sai Dharam Tej, Murali Mohan, Rao Ramesh, Suman, Regina Cassandra, and Adah Sharma. The music is composed by Mickey J Meyer. The film was later remade by Eskay Movies in Bengali in 2018 as Chalbaaz starring Shakib Khan and Subhashree Ganguly.

== Plot ==
Subramanyam, a money-minded person doing odd jobs in United States, comes across Seetha, who ran away on her marriage day. Time passes, and Seetha gets cheated on by her boyfriend Abhi and is stranded in the US. Subramanyam comes to Seetha's rescue and solves her problems. Seetha receives a call from her parents and is told to come along with Subramanyam to come to Kurnool for her sister, Geetha.

Seetha requests Raghava & Subramanyam, who reluctantly accepts the proposal by demanding a considerable amount. The couple lands in Kurnool, and the entire family misunderstands them to be already married. Trouble ensues for Seetha and Subramanyam as Geetha's marriage is fixed with the son of an NRI Rajasekhar, who met Seetha and Subramanyam and misunderstood them as a couple.

Meanwhile, Govind is a dreaded don who is after Subramanyam for him to marry the former's sister, Durga. While pretending to be Seetha's husband, Subramanyam reveals to Govind's henchmen that Durga had made him cancel the marriage as she was in love with an AC repairer named Asgar. Durga reveals the truth and says that Asgar betrayed her for money, and she is ready to marry Subramanyam.

Govind reaches Geetha's marriage and reveals the truth. Despite this, Geetha gets married, and Seetha returns to the US. After a week, Subramanyam also returns and meets Seetha. When Seetha asks about Durga, Subramanyam reveals that Durga canceled the marriage after she learned about Subramanyam's love for Seetha. Later, Seetha and Subramanyam plan their marriage.

== Cast ==
- Sai Dharam Tej as Subramanyam "Subbu"
- Regina Cassandra as Seetha
- Pranitha Subhash As (Cameo)
- Murali Mohan As Raghava, Seetha’s father
- Adah Sharma as Durga
- Brahmanandam as Chintakaya, Subramanyam's uncle
- Suman as Reddappa, Seetha's paternal uncle & families member
- Naga Babu as NRI Rajashekhar, Subramanyam’s friend Along With Redappa
- Rao Ramesh As B.M Bujji, Local Goon & Redappa’s Big Father
- Ajay as Govind, Durga's brother
- Kota Srinivasa Rao as Govind's father
- Naresh as Subramanyam's father
- Jhansi as Parvathamma, Subramanyam's stepmother
- Tejaswi Madivada as Geetha, Seetha's younger sister
- Pragathi as Seetha's aunt and Redappa's wife
- Surekha Vani as Seetha's aunt
- Pradeep Shakti as Avakai restaurant's owner in the US
- Thagubothu Ramesh as Dasu
- Mast Ali as Asgar; a AC repairer
- Jeeva as Home Minister Yesupadam
- Shatru as Bala
- Prabhas Sreenu as Prabhakar, Seetha's elder cousin-brother
- Narsing Yadav as Narsing
- Fish Venkat as Govind's henchman
- Ranadhir Reddy as Abhi, Seetha’s boyfriend
- Ananth Babu
- Rupa Lakshmi
- Kamal
- Prasanna Kumar
- Chitti
- Giridhar as Govind's henchmen
- Bhanu Sree Reddy

== Soundtrack ==
Subramanyam For Sale

Soundtrack album by Mickey J Meyer
- Released: 17 August 2015
- Recorded: 2015
- Genre: Soundtrack
- Length: 20:51
- Label: Aditya Music
- Producer: Mickey J Meyer

Mickey J Meyer chronology
Kerintha (2015)	Subramanyam For Sale (2015)	Brahmotsavam (2016)

The music was composed by Mickey J Meyer and Raj–Koti (remix of one song from Khaidi No. 786). The music released on Aditya Music Company. Audio was launched on 17 August 2015, held at Hyderabad Shilpakala Vedika by Chiranjeevi on the eve of his birthday.

Track-List
No.	Title	Lyrics	Singer(s)	Length
1.	"Subramanyam For Sale"	Vanamali	Rahul Nambiar	3:57
2.	"I’m in Love"	Vanamali	Aishwarya Majmudar, Aditya	3:54
3.	"Aakasam Thassadiyya"	Bhaskarabhatla Ravi Kumar	Krishna Chaitanya, Ramya Behara	3:47
4.	"Guvva Gorinkatho"	Bhuvana Chandra	Ramya Behara, Mano	4:21
5.	"Telugante"	Chandrabose	Shankar Mahadevan	4:05
Total length:				20:51

== Reception ==
=== Critical response ===
Pranita Jonnalagedda of The Times of India gave 3/5 stars and wrote "All the key elements that make a typical Tollywood flick are sprinkled in abundance. It's a film Sai Dharam Tej fans would want to watch."
