= Naayudamma =

- Directed by: A. Madhava Sai
- Written by: B. V. S. Ravi
- Produced by: Gopal Ramchandani; M. Ramakrishna
- Starring: Vijayashanti; Prabhu Deva
- Cinematography: Diwakar
- Music by: Deva
- Production company: Srimahalakshmi Moviemakers
- Release date: 11 August 2006
- Country: India
- Language: Telugu

Naayudamma is a 2006 Indian Telugu action-drama film directed by Madhava Sai. It stars Vijayashanti, Prabhu Deva and Rekha in the lead roles. Naayudamma had been in the making for several years, before opening to mixed reviews in August 2006.

== Cast ==
- Vijayashanti as Naayudamma and Jhansi
- Prabhu Deva
- Rekha
- Sayaji Shinde
- Mansoor Ali Khan
- Narasimha Raju
- Shivadhwaj
- Delhi Ganesh
- Riyaz Khan
- M. S. Narayana
- Kondavalasa

== Production ==
The production of Nayudamma was initially planned in three languages; Kannada, Tamil and Telugu, but the delayed nature of the production meant that the idea was shelved. The delay of the film meant that Vijayashanti had already opted to quit films and pursue a political career, by the end of shoot in 2004. The film was stuck in production for several years, before having a delayed release in August 2006.

== Release ==
Vijayashanti's political affiliations meant that posters of the film were burnt after she campaigned solely for the development of Telangana.
