= Venkat (actor) =

Telugu actor

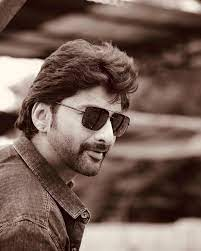
- Born: Venkat Manohar
- Occupation: Actor
- Years active: 1998–present

Venkat is an Indian actor who works predominantly in Telugu-language films. He is best known for his work in Sri Sita Ramula Kalyanam Chootamu Raarandi (1998).

== Career ==
Venkat is from Vijayawada and lived in Mumbai where he worked as a model during college and for his father's brand of shirts. His pictures in a magazine were noticed by Nagarjuna, who cast him in Sri Sita Ramula Kalyanam Chootamu Raarandi after the film's director Y. V. S. Chowdary wanted a new cast. The film was a box office success and got Venkat further film offers. His next films were the multistarrers Velugu Needalu and Prema Kosam (both 1999). During this period, he played Chiranjeevi's brother in Annayya (2000) and Jagapathi Babu's brother in Siva Rama Raju (2002). Regarding his performance in Annayya, a critic wrote that "Venkat is slightly on a backfoot as for as the dialogue delivery is concerned". He played supporting roles in Bhalevadivi Basu (2001), Anandam (2001), Siva Rama Raju (2002) and Madhyanam Hathya (2004). He returned as a lead with Charminar (2003), which was a box office failure. Regarding his performance, a critic noted that "Venkat's good physique and histrionic talent are wasted in this thankless role". He fractured his left leg while shooting for Kurukshetram.

He made his Hindi film debut under the stage name of Viraaj Kumar with the moderately successful Rafta Rafta – The Speed (2006) and made his comeback as a lead in Telugu with the thriller Konchem Kothaga (2008), which had a low-key release and received positive reviews from the audience. He played a police officer in Aa Aiduguru (2014). After a gap of six years, he returned with Run (2020) in the role of a cop.

== Filmography ==
Year	Film	Role	Notes	Ref.
1998	Sri Sita Ramula Kalyanam Chootamu Raarandi	Raju		
1999	Velugu Needalu	Gopi		
1999	Prema Kosam	Chandu		
2000	Annayya	Gopi		
2000	Yuvaraju	Vamsi		
2001	Bhalevadivi Basu	Sagar		
2001	Anandam	Vamsi		
2002	Siva Rama Raju	Rama Raju		
2003	Charminar	Nandu		
2004	Madhyanam Hathya	Rohit		
2006	Rafta Rafta – The Speed	Rahul	Hindi film; credited as Viraaj Kumar	
2006	Thrill			
2007	Madhumasam	Peter	Cameo appearance	
2008	Konchem Kothaga	Venkat		
2009	A Aa E Ee	Venkat	Cameo appearance	
2009	Saleem	Krish		
2014	Aa Aiduguru	Thota Chakravarthy		
2014	Mana Kurrale	Appu		
2020	Run	Bharath		
2021	Ichata Vahanamulu Niluparadu	Narasimha Yadav		
2023	Organic Mama Hybrid Alludu	Himself	Cameo appearance	
2024	Maa Nanna Superhero	Circle Inspector		
2025	They Call Him OG	Parthasarathi "Pardhu" Roy Nandan		
2026	Harudu	DCP Shankar alias Encounter Shankar		

=== Television ===
Year	Title	Role	Network	Notes	Ref
2020	Loser	Raghavender	Zee5	Season 2; cameo appearance	
2021	The Baker and the Beauty	Lakshmi	Aha		
