= Ayodhya (2005 Telugu film) =

- DVD cover
- Directed by: Kodi Ramakrishna
- Written by: Kodi Ramakrishna; B. V. S. Ravi (dialogues)
- Produced by: Dodda Rama Govinda Reddy
- Starring: Krishna; Vadde Naveen; Rathi; Shiju; Prema
- Cinematography: Kodi Lakshman
- Edited by: Ramesh
- Music by: Vandemataram Srinivas
- Production company: Maruthi Combines
- Release date: 21 April 2005
- Country: India
- Language: Telugu

Ayodhya is a 2005 Indian Telugu-language family drama film directed by Kodi Ramakrishna and starring Krishna, Vadde Naveen, Rathi, Shiju and Prema.

== Cast ==
- Krishna as Ram Prasad
- Vadde Naveen as Rajesh
- Rathi as Sasirekha aka Shotput
- Shiju as Jagan
- Prema as Jyothi
- Ravi as Ravi
- Harsha
- Jhansi as Jagan's wife
- Brahmanandam as Tribal
- Dharmavarapu Subramanyam as Police officer
- Pavala Syamala as Gangamma
- Mandadi Krishna Reddy as JK
- Vemi Reddy
- Narsimha Reddy
- M Satyanarayana Reddy
- A Narasimha Rao

== Soundtrack ==
The music was composed by Vandemataram Srinivas and the audio rights were bagged by Aditya Music.

Track listing
No.	Title	Lyrics	Singer(s)	Length
1.	"Chodo Chodo"	Suddala Ashok Teja	Tippu, Malathi
2.	"Adagandhe Andaalu"	Jayasurya	Tippu, Kalpana
3.	"Aa Gaganam Virigindha"	C. Narayana Reddy	S. P. Balasubrahmanyam
4.	"Jimmu Choodu"	Suddala Ashok Teja	Vasu, Nishma
5.	"Navvula Puvvulu"	Sai Harsha	Mano

== Reception ==
Jeevi of Idlebrain.com wrote that "Only saving grace of this film is the performance of Krishna and Prema. You can safely avoid watching 'Ayodhya'".
