= Y. V. S. Chowdary =

Indian writer, director, and producer

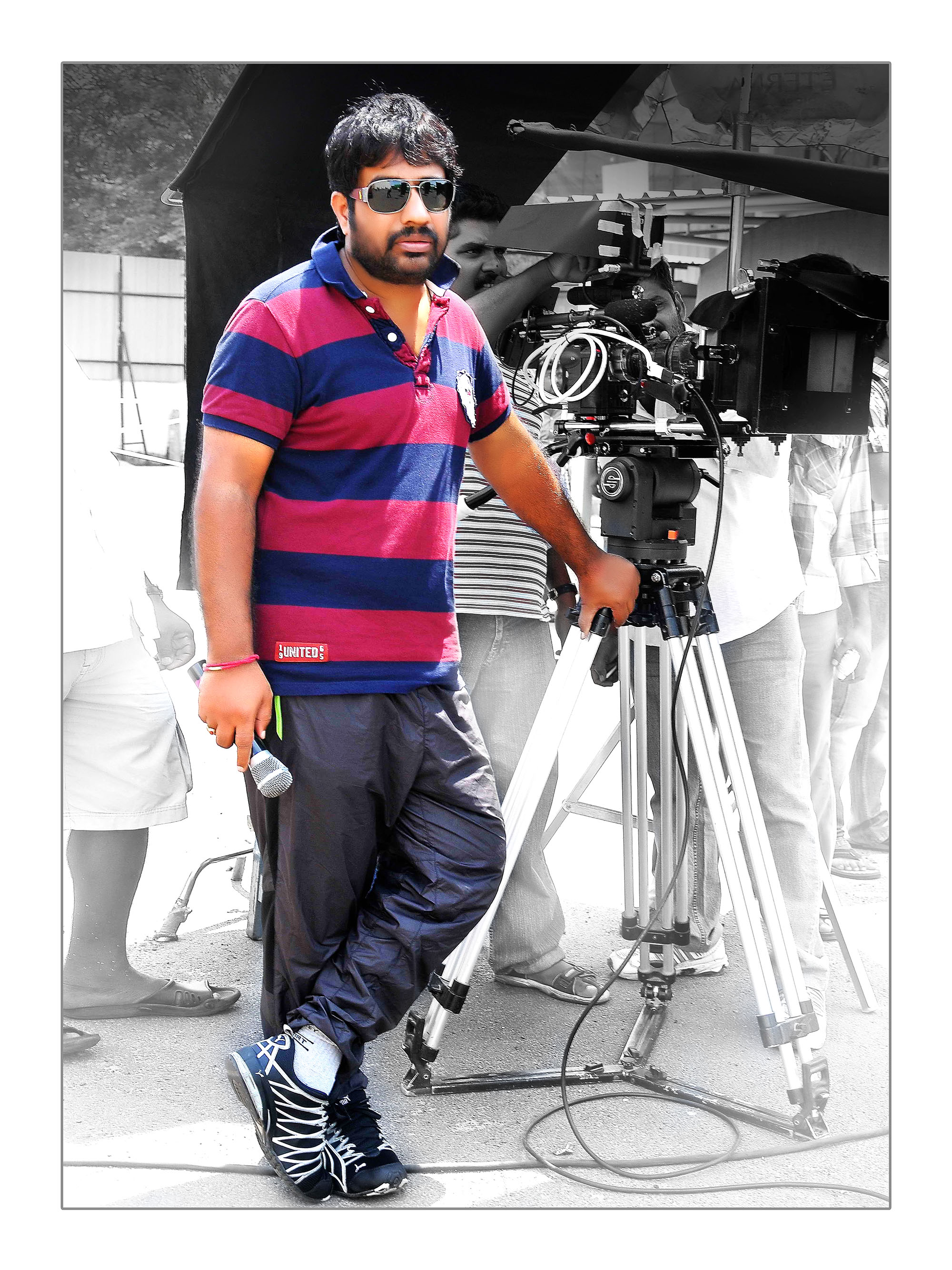
- Chowdary on sets of Rey
- Born: Yalamanchili Venkata Satyanarayana Chowdary; Gudivada, Krishna, Andhra Pradesh, India
- Occupations: screenwriter; film director; film producer; film distributor; film exhibitor; music label owner
- Years active: 1998 – present

Yalamanchili Venkata Satyanarayana Chowdary is an Indian Telugu cinema writer, director, producer, distributor, exhibitor and a music company owner. He made his debut as a director in 1998 with the film Sri Sita Ramula Kalyanam Chootamu Raarandi produced by Nagarjuna under the banner "Great India Entertainments". He then directed Seetharama Raju starring Nagarjuna and Nandamuri Harikrishna, and Yuvaraju starring Mahesh Babu. He then established his own production house "Bommarillu Vari" and started producing his own directorial efforts with Lahiri Lahiri Lahirilo. Later, he directed Seetayya, Devadasu, Okka Magaadu, Saleem, Rey. Among these, Saleem is the only film which is not from his production house. He has directed nine films till date. In 2012, he produced Nippu starring Ravi Teja and Deeksha Seth under the direction of Gunasekhar.

Chowdary says he entered the Telugu film industry inspired by Nandamuri Taraka Rama Rao. He introduced various actors including Venkat, Chandini and Chandu with his debut film Sri Sita Ramula Kalyanam Chootamu Raarandi (1998), Aditya Om and Ankitha with Lahiri Lahiri Lahirilo (2002), Ram Pothineni and Ileana with Devadasu (2006), Sai Dharam Tej and Saiyami Kher with Rey (2015), though Sai Dharam Tej's second film Pilla Nuvvu Leni Jeevitham (2014) was released earlier than Rey.

== Early life ==
Chowdary was born on at Gudiwada of Krishna district as a last child to the couple Yalamanchili Narayana Rao and Ratnakumari. His father was a truck driver and mother was a housewife. His family was of lower middle class and his parents were uneducated.

He joined a college at Gudiwada to pursue Intermediate and joined an engineering college at Madras.

== Film career ==
=== Early years ===
Chowdary joined as an assistant to editor Narasimha Rao. He also worked under K. Raghavendra Rao in Kaliyuga Pandavulu (1986), Sahasa Samrat (1987), Agni Putrudu (1987), Donga Ramudu (1988), Janaki Ramudu (1988), Rudranetra (1989), and Jagadeka Veerudu Athiloka Sundari (1990).

=== Career expansion ===
Chowdary's directorial debut, Sri Sitaramula Kalyanam Chutamu Rarandi (1998), started with Nagarjuna as producer, under the "Great India Entertainments" production house. Starring ANR and debutant Venkat in the lead roles, it released on 26 June 1998 to positive reviews and was successful, which brought him 26 offers from different producers. After the success of his debut film, Nagarjuna gave Chowdary another opportunity to direct him, which turned out to be his second film, Seetharama Raju (1999), also starring Nandamuri Harikrishna. He later directed Yuvaraju (2000), starring Mahesh Babu, Simran, and Sakshi Shivanand. Unlike his first two films, Yuvaraju opened to mixed reviews and was only an average grosser at the box office.

=== Turning into producer: Lahiri Lahiri Lahirilo (2002) ===
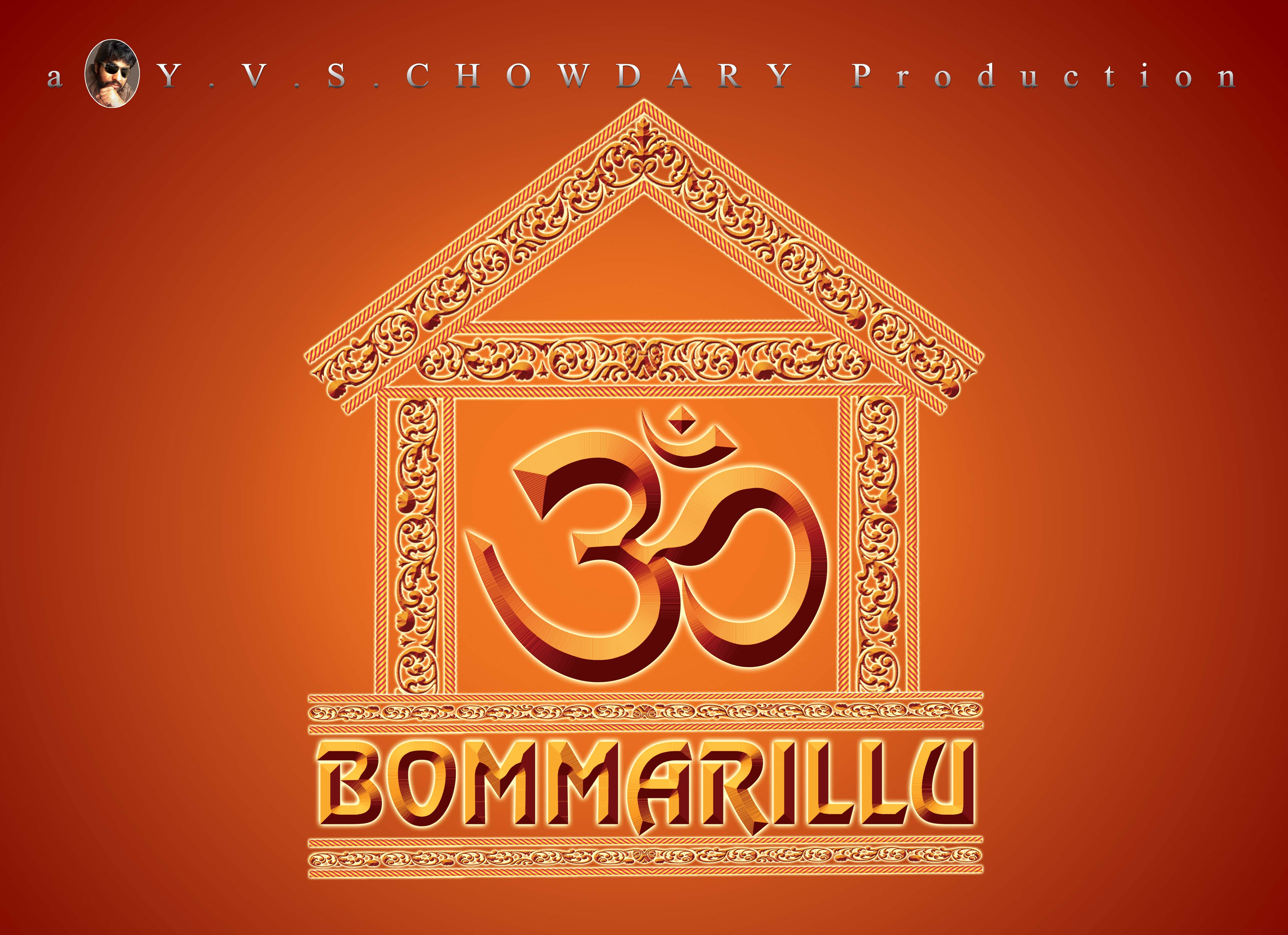
Logo of Chowdary's production house "Bommarillu Vaari". "Bommarillu means a house that makes films or a house that exhibits films", Chowdary said in an interview.

His first production, Lahiri Lahiri Lahirilo (2002), starring Nandamuri Harikrishna, was named after the title of a song from the popular and evergreen Telugu film, Mayabazar (1957), directed by K. V. Reddy. The film became successful and ran for 100 days and he organized the event at Gudiwada. In an interview, Chowdary stated that R. Narayana Murthy, who established "Sneha Chitra" and E. V. V. Satyanarayana, who established E. V .V. Cinema, inspired him to establish "Bommarillu Vaari".

=== Later years (2003–present) ===
Nandamuri Harikrishna became a commercially successful actor at the age of 48 with Seetayya (2003), directed by Chowdary. After Seetayya, Chowdary met Sravanthi Ravi Kishore for a directorial opportunity. The film, Devadasu (2006), featured Kishore's nephew, Ram Pothineni, and Ileana D'Cruz in the lead roles. It was released on 11 January 2006 and became a slow blockbuster after a theatrical run of 47 days, eventually grossing ₹17 crores. During the post production of Devadasu, Chowdary approached Nandamuri Balakrishna to collaborate for Okka Magaadu. It was released on 11 January 2008. The film became a flop and most of the theaters were seen vacant after the first week of release.

Chowdary then directed Saleem starring Manchu Vishnu, Ileana and Mohan Babu in prominent roles. It was produced by Mohan Babu in his production house Sree Lakshmi Prasanna Pictures. This was the only film Chowdary didn't produce after establishing his own production house. It was released on 12 December 2009 and failed to get appreciation from audiences and critics.

In 2012, Chowdary produced the film Nippu under the direction of Gunasekhar, starring Ravi Teja and Deeksha Seth. Chowdary and Ravi Teja shared same room and Gunasekhar lived in another floor of same building at Madras, during their trails in film industry. This film was released on 17 February 2012. Though it got good openings it turned out to be a flop later. In 2010, Chowdary launched the film Rey introducing Chiranjeevi's nephew Sai Dharam Tej and Saiyami Kher as lead actors. The release was then postponed to 2013 but it didn't happen too. Finally, the film was released on 27 March 2015. Meanwhile, Tej's second film Pilla Nuvvu Leni Jeevitham directed by A. S. Ravikumar Chowdary was released. However, Rey became a flop. Chowdary is now in trails of launching his next film with debut actors again.

== Personal life ==
While working for Ninne Pelladata, Chowdary liked actress Geetha who played the role of Nagarjuna's sister. With mutual consent, they both wanted to get married but Chowdary's parents were not willing to accept an inter-caste marriage. Later, he convinced them and married Geetha. She also acted in Sindhooram opposite Ravi Teja. After Seetayya, Chowdary took a break of one year as his brother expired and Chowdary's elder daughter was born. Chowdary has two daughters.

Chowdary had a good personal rapport with Nandamuri Harikrishna from the time of Pattabhishekam, as the latter was the producer of that film. Harikrishna personally took Chowdary along with him to many places. "He was the person who taught me the etiquettes of star hotels. I never knew how to use forks", Chowdary remembered his relationship with Harikrishna in an interview. After the success of Lahiri Lahiri Lahirilo, Chowdary held a function at a place where Harikrishna contested and failed in elections, to show the following he had.

== Other work ==
Chowdary is a big fan of Nandamuri Taraka Rama Rao whom he claims as his inspiration to enter the film industry. Every film produced in his production house "Bommarillu Vaari" starts with a prayer song on NTR by showing his picture on screen. It ends showing his picture again. The prayer song was written, composed and sung by music director M. M. Keeravani. Chowdary started an audio company "Yuktha Music" named after his elder daughter Yuktha and released the audio of Devadasu as the first album through it. He printed 36-page and 24-page special invitations for the film launch and audio launch events respectively of Devadasu.

Chowdary purchased the "Gopala Krishna" theater at Gudivada. He renovated it and renamed it as "Bommarillu" after his production house. It was the first movie theater at Gudivada with AC and DTS technologies. He exhibited Okka Magaadu as the first film in it.

== Filmography ==
| Year | Film | Credited as | | | Notes | Ref. |
| Year | Film | Director | Writer | Producer | Notes | Ref. |
|---|---|---|---|---|---|---|
| 1998 | Sri Sita Ramula Kalyanam Chootamu Raarandi | Yes | Yes | No | | |
| 1999 | Seetharama Raju | Yes | Yes | No | | |
| 2000 | Yuvaraju | Yes | Yes | No | | |
| 2002 | Lahiri Lahiri Lahirilo | Yes | Yes | Yes | | |
| 2003 | Seetayya | Yes | Screenplay | Yes | | |
| 2003 | Tiger Harischandra Prasad | No | No | No | Editor | |
| 2006 | Devadasu | Yes | Yes | Yes | | |
| 2008 | Okka Magaadu | Yes | Yes | Yes | | |
| 2009 | Saleem | Yes | Yes | No | | |
| 2012 | Nippu | No | No | Yes | | |
| 2014 | Rey | Yes | Yes | Yes | | |
