= Rey (film) =

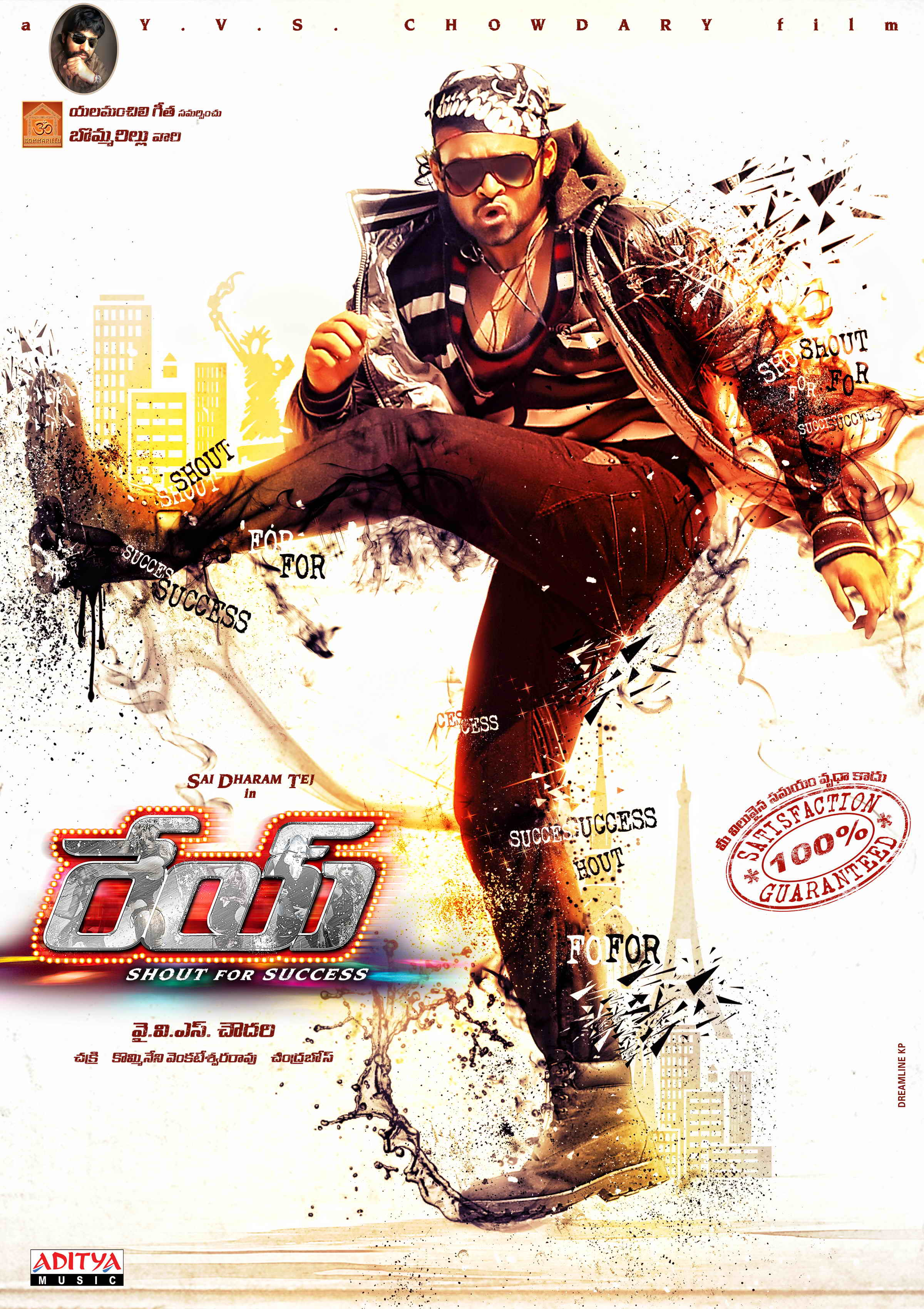
- Movie poster
- Directed by: Y. V. S. Chowdary
- Screenplay by: Y. V. S. Chowdary; Rajasimha; Sridhar Seepana
- Story by: Y. V. S. Chowdary
- Produced by: Y. V. S. Chowdary
- Starring: Sai Dharam Tej; Shraddha Das; Saiyami Kher
- Cinematography: Gunasekharan
- Edited by: Kotagiri Venkateswara Rao
- Music by: Chakri
- Production company: Bommarillu Vaari
- Release date: 20 January 2014
- Running time: 165 minutes
- Country: India
- Language: Telugu

Rey is a 2014 Indian Telugu-language romantic action dance film produced and directed by YVS Chowdary. The film stars Sai Dharam Tej (in his debut), Saiyami Kher, Shraddha Das while Arpit Ranka and Farhad Shahnawaz play supporting roles. Chakri composed the music.

The film was launched at Ramanaidu Studios in Hyderabad on 17 October 2010 on the eve of Vijayadashami, and ended on 6 August 2013. The film is released on 20 January 2014.

== Cast ==
- Sai Dharam Tej as Rock, Gangster of Jamaica
- Saiyami Kher as Amrutha
- Shraddha Das as Jenna, Goddess of America
- Farhad Shahnawaz as Sandy
- Arpit Ranka as Dange, a don in USA
- Naresh as Rock's father
- Richie Stephens as The Reverend
- Ali as Lungi Baba
- Venu Madhav as Virus
- Jaya Prakash Reddy as Principal
- Brahmanandam as Siva Reddy
- Rao Ramesh as Ramareddy
- Tanikella Bharani as Nagareddy
- Noel Sean as Balareddy
- M. S. Narayana as Rama
- Raghu Babu as Bhaskar
- Duvvasi Mohan as Krishnareddy
- Kota Srinivasa Rao as Radhareddy
- Praveen as Naga Rao
- Saptagiri as Shankar

== Soundtrack ==
Rey

Soundtrack album by Chakri
- Released: 3 December 2013
- Recorded: 2011–2013
- Genre: Film soundtrack
- Length: 37:41
- Language: Telugu
- Label: Aditya Music
- Producer: Chakri

Chakri chronology
Devaraya (2012)	Rey (2013)	Laddu Babu (2014)

The music composed by Chakri, with lyrics written by Chandrabose. The soundtrack album was released under the label Aditya Music on 3 December 2013. The soundtrack received a mixed review from Cinecorn.com, receiving a rating of 2/5, stating Director YVS Chowdhary for the maximum part hasn't disappointed musically despite the ‘been there, done that kind’ of feel it evokes but fails to deliver a knock out album. One feels the extra hard work being put for the album but it ends up hurting the album. Rey too is in similar vein and a lot depends on the choreography and placement of the songs in the film as well."

No.	Title	Singer(s)	Length
1.	"Girls"	Ranjith, Noel Sean, Sahithi, Sravani, Deepthi, Pranika, Neha	5:18
2.	"Oh Dear"	Chakri, S. Thaman, Hemachandra, Rahul Nambiar, Sri Mani, Chandrabose	5:23
3.	"Rey (Theme)"	Noel Sean	1:22
4.	"Golimar"	Vasu, Noel Sean	5:09
5.	"Ammaaye"	Chakri, Venu, Dinker, Noel Sean, Saicharan, Sahithi, Shravani, Deepthi, Neha, Parinika	5:43
6.	"Priyathama"	Chakri	5:56
7.	"Dance"	Jaspreet Jasz, Suchitra, L. V. Revanth	5:00
8.	"Rey (Manthra)"	Sravana Bhargavi	1:17
9.	"Power Of Rey"	Chakri, Noel Shan, Bhargavi Pillai	8:04
10.	"Rey With Pawanism"	Narendra, Noyal Sean	4:57
Total length:			37:41

== Reception ==
=== Box office ===
Rey collected a share of ₹1.55 crore on its opening day at the AP and Nizam box office
