= Sai Durgha Tej =

Indian actor

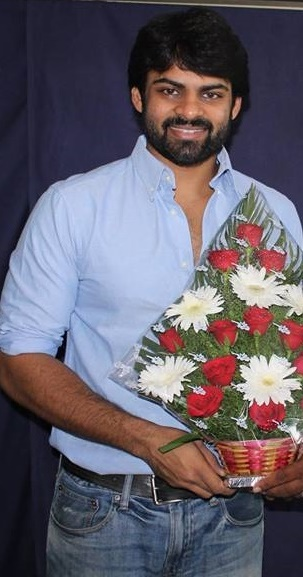
- Tej in 2015
- Born: Panja Sai Dharam Tej; 15 October 1986 (age 40); Hyderabad, Andhra Pradesh (now in Telangana), India
- Other name: Sai Dharam Tej
- Education: St. Mary's College, Hyderabad
- Occupation: Actor
- Years active: 2013–present
- Relatives: Panja Vaisshnav Tej (brother)
- Family: Konidela–Allu family

Sai Durgha Tej (born Panja Sai Dharam Tej; 15 October 1986) is an Indian actor who predominantly works in Telugu films. Tej started his acting career with the box office success Pilla Nuvvu Leni Jeevitham (2014), which earned him the SIIMA Award for Best Male Debut – Telugu.

Post his debut, Tej appeared in films such as Subramanyam for Sale (2015) and Supreme (2016), which were box office successes. Back-to-back critical and commercial failures followed this. Tej then went onto establish himself with successful films Chitralahari (2019) and Prati Roju Pandage (both 2019), Solo Brathuke So Better (2020) and Republic (2021). In 2023, Tej appeared in two of the year's highest grossing films — Virupaksha and Bro.

== Early life and background ==
Tej was born as Panja Sai Dharam Tej to Dr. Siva Prasad and Vijaya Durga, the younger sister of Telugu film actor-politician Chiranjeevi, on 15 October 1986. His paternal Panja family hails from Panja Vemavaram village, Veeravasaram mandal, West Godavari district, Andhra Pradesh. Tej did his schooling from Chettinad Vidyashram, Chennai and Nalanda School, Hyderabad and completed his graduation from St. Mary's College, Hyderabad. His younger brother Panja Vaisshnav Tej is also an actor in TFI .

Actors Ram Charan, Varun Tej and Niharika Konidela are Tej's cousins. Pawan Kalyan and Nagendra Babu are his maternal uncles. Actors Allu Arjun and Allu Sirish and their father, Allu Aravind are related by marriage through Chiranjeevi.

In March 2024, he announced that he is changing his name from Sai Dharam Tej to Sai Durgha Tej. The changed name is derived from both his mother's name.

== Career ==
=== Debut and early work (2014–2018) ===
Tej made his film debut with Pilla Nuvvu Leni Jeevitham, opposite Regina Cassandra in 2014. The film was a hit at the box office. Times of India noted, "... Tej’s rustic charm makes his actions believable. The actor is particularly quite impressive with his dance moves". Deccan Chronicle stated, "Sai Dharam Tej delivers a mature performance. He entertains throughout the film with his performance and he has done this quite comfortably." He received SIIMA Award for Best Male Debut - Telugu for his performance.

Tej had two releases in 2015. His first film was Rey where he portrayed Rock opposite Saiyami Kher. 123telugu said, "Sai Dharam Tej’s electrifying performance is the major asset of this film." Tej's second release in 2015 was Subramanyam for Sale, which was successful at the box office, grossing over ₹33.95 crore. He starred alongside Regina Cassandra, for the second time, after Pilla Nuvvu Leni Jeevitham (2014). Although various critics called it "routine", Tej's portrayal was cited as "improved performance", "spontaneous", and "stunning".

=== Resurgence and other work (2016–2018) ===
Tej's action comedy Supreme which released the following year, was also financially successful and is one of his best movies. Following Supreme, Tej went onto star in five films (in lead), including Thikka (2016), Winner (2017), Jawaan (2017), Inttelligent (2018) and Tej I Love You (2018). Tej was criticized for selecting similar and regular stories in his films.

=== Commercial success and progression (2019–present) ===
Chitralahari was his first release of 2019. The film was a box office success with critics praising his performance and Tej giving one of his career best performances. The Times of India had called the character Vijay in the film, the best in Tej's career so far. About his role in the film, Deccan Chronicle reported "Sai Tej has put on weight and with a beard looks fresh and fits the character. For this role, he has completely set aside his mass image". His next film of the year, Prati Roju Pandage was also successful. Murali Krishna CH of The New Indian Express in his review of the film, wrote that "The film definitely Sai Tej’s canvas and he delivers his standard chops with flamboyance". Later in 2020, his film Solo Brathuke So Better was released following the COVID-19 pandemic. Despite the restriction of 50% occupancy in cinemas, the film was successful at the box office. Idlebrain's Jeevi appreciated Tej's performance, particularly his comedy timing and acting in the emotional scenes of the film. In contrast, Y Sunita Chowdhary of The Hindu opined that "Tej could have benefited from a better script."

In his next film Republic (2021), directed by Deva Katta, Tej played the role of an IAS officer. The film, a political drama, opened to positive reviews, with critics calling his performance "matured" and the film was well received by audience and became a 'hit'. Prakash Pecheti of Telangana Today stated: "Republic surely adds a cap in the feather for Sai Dharam Tej."

Tej's 15th film, Virupaksha, a socio-fantasy thriller directed by Karthik Varma Dandu of Bham Bolenath fame, opened to generally positive reviews and became the highest-grossing film of his career. He next acted with his maternal uncle, Pawan Kalyan, in the remake of Vinodhaya Sitham, Bro, directed by Samuthirakani, who also directed the original. It released in July 2023. He has also signed films with debutant Jayanth Panuganti and Sampath Nandi.

== Motorbike accident ==
In September 2021, Tej was in a single-vehicle motorcycle accident near the Durgam Cheruvu Bridge in Hyderabad. He was admitted to Apollo Hospitals whose doctors announced that he sustained soft tissue injuries and a collar bone fracture but was out of danger. He announced a six-month career break in July 2023 to focus on fitness and get back into form.

== Media image ==
Tej stood at the 25th place on Forbes India's most influential stars on Instagram in South cinema for the year 2021. He ranked 24th in Hyderabad Times Most Desirable Men list of 2016.

Tej turned brand ambassador for ‘Sky Zone Park’. He also became an ambassador for charity organisation 'Think Peace'.

== Filmography ==
=== Films ===
Key
| † | Denotes films that have not yet been released |

| Year | Title | Role | Notes | Ref. |
|---|---|---|---|---|
| 2014 | Pilla Nuvvu Leni Jeevitham | Srinu | | |
| 2015 | Rey | Rock | | |
| 2015 | Subramanyam for Sale | Subramanyam "Subbu" | | |
| 2016 | Supreme | Balu | | |
| 2016 | Thikka | Aditya | | |
| 2017 | Winner | Siddharth "Siddu" Reddy | | |
| 2017 | Nakshatram | Alexander IPS | | |
| 2017 | Jawaan | Yellapragada Jai | | |
| 2018 | Inttelligent | Dharma Teja / Dharma Bhai | | |
| 2018 | Tej I Love You | Tej | | |
| 2019 | Chitralahari | Vijay Krishna | | |
| 2019 | Prati Roju Pandage | Sai Tej | | |
| 2020 | Solo Brathuke So Better | Virat | | |
| 2021 | Republic | Panja Abhiram IAS | | |
| 2023 | Virupaksha | Surya | | |
| 2023 | Bro | Markandeyulu "Mark" and Sanjay Rajan | | |
| 2023 | Soul of Satya | Satya | Short film | |
| 2027 | SYG - Sambarala Yeti Gattu † | Bali | Filming | |

=== Television ===
| Year | Title | Role | Notes | Ref. |
|---|---|---|---|---|
| 2017 | Nenu Mee Kalyan | Himself | Guest appearance | |

== Accolades ==
| Year | Award | Category | Work | Result | Ref. |
|---|---|---|---|---|---|
| 2015 | South Indian International Movie Awards | Best Male Debut - Telugu | Pilla Nuvvu Leni Jeevitam | Won | |
| 2015 | Filmfare Awards South | Best Male Debut – South | Pilla Nuvvu Leni Jeevitam | Nominated | |
| 2015 | 13th Santosham Film Awards | Best Male Debut | Pilla Nuvvu Leni Jeevitam | Won | |
| 2015 | CineMAA Awards | Best Male Debut | Pilla Nuvvu Leni Jeevitam | Won | |
| 2024 | South Indian International Movie Awards | Best Actor – Telugu | Virupaksha | Nominated | |
