= Seetayya =

Seethaiyya
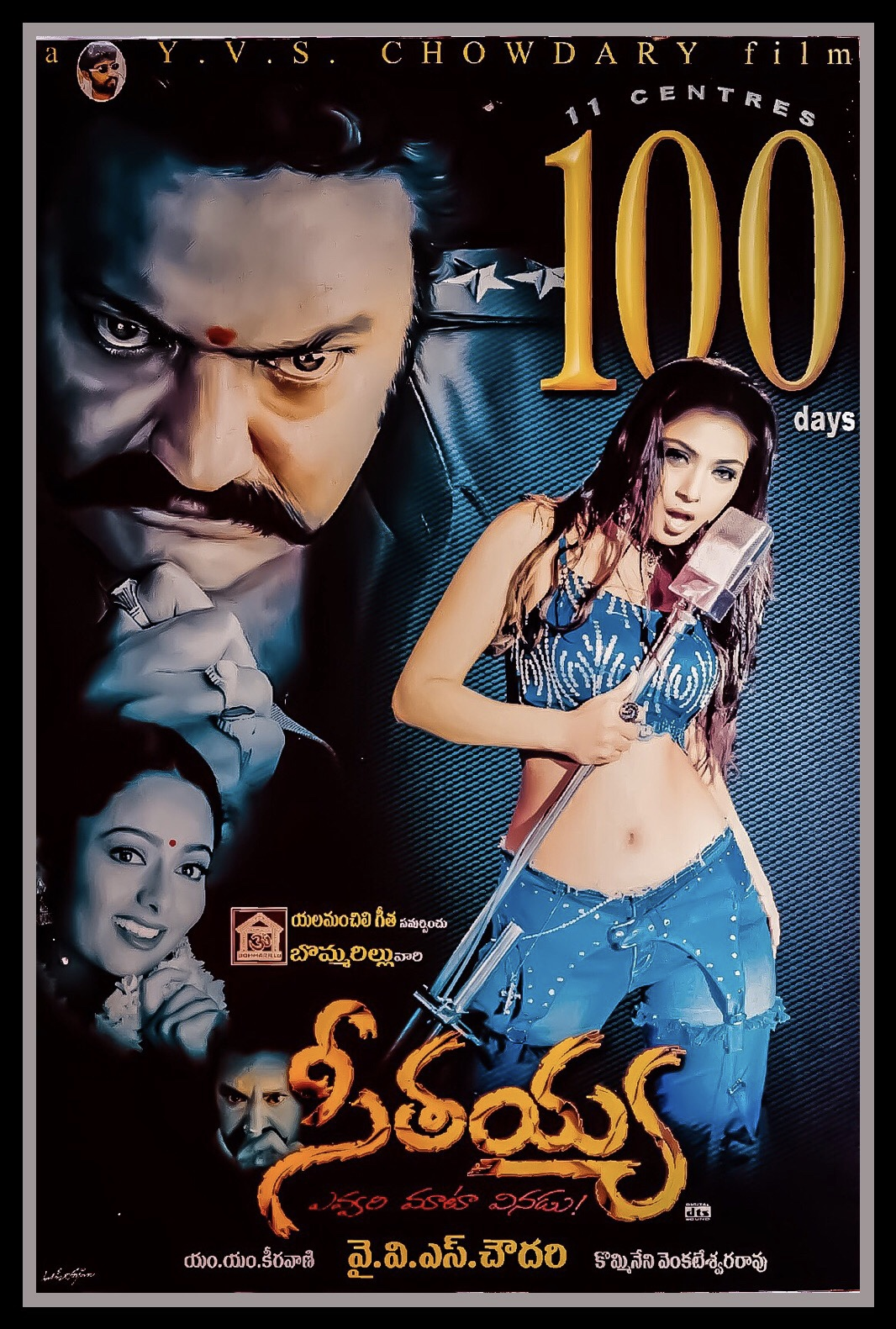
- Promotional poster
- Directed by: YVS Chowdary
- Screenplay by: YVS Chowdary; Posani Krishna Murali
- Story by: Posani Krishna Murali
- Produced by: YVS Chowdary
- Starring: Nandamuri Harikrishna; Soundarya; Simran
- Cinematography: Madhu A. Naidu
- Edited by: Kotagiri Venkateswara Rao
- Music by: M.M. Keeravani
- Release date: 22 August 2003
- Running time: 179 minutes
- Country: India
- Language: Telugu
- Box office: ₹9 crore distributors' share

Seetayya is a 2003 Indian Telugu-language action drama film directed by Y. V. S. Chowdary and written by Posani Krishna Murali. It stars Nandamuri Harikrishna as lead actor alongside Soundarya and Simran as co-stars. Music for the movie was well received and composed by M.M. Keeravani.

== Plot ==
The movie starts with introducing two rival faction families in Rayalaseema dharmavaram one was Durgamba family who plan to take revenge on their rival venkat rayudu (mukeshrishi) family with her mother and daughter Durgamba mother mentions not to forget loss for them because of Venkat rayudu Durgamba says that she was not changed as widow after losing her husband due to revenge on Venkat rayudu Meanwhile, Durgamba daughter Jaya scolds her husband when he arrived to give carriage and mentions to meet her after killing or attacking Venkat rayudu but he leaves Durgamba mother mentions that Venkat rayudu went to America for knee operation and asks to plan railway contract tender which was going to Venkat rayudu family and asks to make phone call to her husbands younger brother sarvarayudu(jayaprakashreddy) who was jail sarvarayudu promises that he will grab the contract from jail and asks help of his partner obulu Another side Venkat rayudu wife ganganamba mentions that about Durgamba plan and mentions that her every one should be feared by hearing his husband name and tender should be get into there hands her sons and son in law promises to grab the contract by spending money but ganganamba brother chengal rayudu (rahuldev) who was a lawyer mentions that it was not correct to spend money it was correct to make fear and calls chaudappa asks to clean obul batch publicly who were in venkateswara lodge chaudappa accepts and attacks them with bombs and kills them brutally on road same time dsp arrives and become serious but gets cool immediately and mentions that they know every thing but won't take any action after chaudappa leaves Durgamba arrives and slaps dsp for supporting Venkat rayudu family at that evening police batch discuss that not even god can change this factionism at same time Seetayya(NandamuriHarikrishna) enters to Rayalaseema in tender office chaudappa asks officer to register the tender on Venkat rayudu name but he says that one more person applied for the tender when chaudappa asks about him an old person enters to office Seetayya arrives by holding umbrella old person mentions that he will take the contract for same price but chaudappa warns and asks his henchmen to tear his tender papers while his henchmen was tearing the application Seetayya starts attacking them and beats all chaudappa henchmen and warns chaudappa when he tries to attack Seetayya beats him brutally feared chaudappa and his henchmen run to police station and asks to save them Meanwhile, Seetayya arrives as CI to police station and pulls chaudappa on road and slaps a person on road who asks to punish them and mentions every one should punish and explain greatness of Rayalaseema.Afterwards DSP (Aahutiprasad) scolds Seetayya not arresting Chaudappa But Seetayya explains he escaped by biting his tie but dsp asked to caught him in twenty four hours Seetayya accepts and move Thinking about the insult Venkat rayudu wife ganganamba asked to do Seetayya before knowing the insult to her husband her son and son in law promises to attack but she asks to meet her after attacking Seetayya and locks her in room they meet ganagamba brother who was watching Seetayya rally video and asks to plan for attacking Seetayya but he mentions that thinking was more important to attack Seetayya he will plan by learning Seetayya weakness same time a batch arrives behind Seetayya house and watch him and takes bombs and knife's from there bags and informs opposite person in phone that they joined in opposite house of Seetayya. The story turns to a riot girl bangaram(Simran) family who were trying to get her married stop two warring factionist families in Dharmavaram from killing each other. Bangaram comes to Seetayya's house by accident and falls in love with him. meanwhile the factionist families come to know of Seetayya's past, Rest of the story is about Seetayya solving the issues and bringing about peace in Rayalaseema.

== Cast ==
- Nandamuri Harikrishna as Seetayya / Sivaiah
- Soundarya as Seeta
- Simran as Bangaram / Pentamma
- Mukesh Rishi as Venkat Rayudu
- Rahul Dev as Chengal Rayudu
- Ravi Prakash as Srinivas Rayudu "Chanti"
- Jaya Prakash Reddy as Sarvarayudu
- Posani Krishna Murali as Anjanappa
- Mohan Raj as Choudappa
- Kanta Rao
- Balayya as Court Judge
- Ahuti Prasad as DSP
- Rajan P Dev as Sivaiah's father
- Devan as Seeta's father
- Nalini as Venkat Rayudu's wife
- Satya Prakash as Venkat Rayudu's son
- Subhashini as Sarvarayudu's wife
- Vindhya as Jayamma
- Brahmanandam as Koti
- Ali as Pentamma
- M. S. Narayana as Jailer Ranjit Kumar
- Dharmavarapu Subramanyam as Bangaram's uncle
- Mallikarjuna Rao as Puliraju, Bangaram's grandfather
- G. V. Sudhakar Naidu as Venkat Rayudu's son-in-law
- Ranganath as Venkat Rayudu's father
- Raghunatha Reddy as Dharma Rayudu, Venkat Rayudu's brother-in-law
- Rama Prabha as Bangaram's grandmother
- Sunitha Verma as Divya
- Kolla Ashok Kumar as Venkat Rayudu's son
- Fish Venkat as Goon

== Soundtrack ==
The music was composed by M. M. Keeravani and released by Aditya Music.

Seetayya

Soundtrack album by M. M. Keeravani
- Released: 2003
- Recorded: 2003
- Genre: Soundtrack
- Length: 43:50
- Label: Aditya Music
- Producer: M. M. Keeravani

M. M. Keeravani chronology
| Simhadri (2003) | Seetayya (2003) | Okariki Okaru (2003) |

Track list
| No. | Title | Lyrics | Singer(s) | Length |
|---|---|---|---|---|
| 1. | "Evarimata Vinadu" | C. Narayana Reddy | Keeravani | 2:58 |
| 2. | "Edhigo Rayalaseemagadda" | C. Narayana Reddy | S. P. Balasubrahmanyam | 4:59 |
| 3. | "Ravayya Ravayya" | C. Narayana Reddy | S. P. Balasubrahmanyam, Keeravani | 3:54 |
| 4. | "Okka Magaadu" | Chandrabose | Keeravani, Anuradha Sriram | 5:35 |
| 5. | "Siggesthondi" | Chandrabose | Shreya Ghoshal, Keeravani | 5:30 |
| 6. | "Bussekki Vastavo" | Chandrabose | S. P. Balasubrahmanyam, K. S. Chithra | 4:55 |
| 7. | "Adhishankarula" | Chandrabose | S. P. B. Charan, Sunitha | 5:21 |
| 8. | "Ammathodu" | Chandrabose | Udit Narayan, K. S. Chihtra | 5:59 |
| 9. | "Samayaniki" | Chandrabose | Vijay Yesudas, Sunitha | 4:39 |
| Total length: | | | | 43:50 |

== Reception ==
A critic from Idlebrain.com rated the film three out of five and wrote that "The first half of the film is decent. But the second half is little slow. The climax is weak. The strengths of the film are Hari Krishna's performance, Keeravani music, YVS's picturization of songs and high production values. The weakness is the story, script and slow narration". A critic from Sify wrote that "The film is tailor made for Harikrishna who tries to imitate his father with all those violent dramatic gestures. Simran provides oomph and mid-riff exposure to the hilt. Director Chowdary has squeezed a lot of mass element, which slows the tempo of the film". A critic from The Hindu wrote that "Scriptwriter Posani Krishnamurali treads the same old path of rendering the film as a verbal drama with theatrical appeal. The screenplay structure looks as if some preconceived scenes of high-voltage drama are pieced together with an otherwise thin storyline".

== Awards ==
- S. P. Balasubrahmanyam won Nandi Award for Best Male Playback Singer for the song "Idhigo Rayalaseemagadda"
