= Seetharama Raju =

1999 Indian Telugu drama film

- Theatrical release poster
- Directed by: Y. V. S. Chowdary
- Written by: Posani Krishna Murali (Dialogues)
- Screenplay by: Y. V. S. Chowdary
- Story by: Y. V. S. Chowdary
- Produced by: Nagarjuna, D. Sivaprasad Reddy
- Starring: Harikrishna; Nagarjuna; Sakshi Shivanand; Sanghavi; Ravi Teja
- Cinematography: K. Rajendra Prasad
- Edited by: Shankar
- Music by: M. M. Keeravani
- Distributed by: Great India Entertainments; Kamakshi Movies
- Release date: 5 February 1999
- Running time: 166 minutes
- Country: India
- Language: Telugu

Seetharama Raju is a 1999 Indian Telugu-language action drama film written and directed by Y. V. S. Chowdary. Produced by Nagarjuna, and D. Sivaprasad Reddy, it stars Nandamuri Harikrishna, Nagarjuna Akkineni, Sakshi Shivanand, and Sanghavi with music composed by M. M. Keeravani. The film won two state Nandi Awards. It was dubbed in Tamil as Chathriya Dharmam.

== Plot ==
The movie starts with introducing two rival villages Pedda Ogirala which was ruled by two brothers Basavaraju (Kota srinivasa rao) and Chanti(Satyaprakash) and Chinna Ogirala which was ruled by another two brothers Seetayya(Hari Krishna) and Ramaraju(Nagarjuna) A person named Seenu(Ravi Teja) who gets stabbed by Basavaraju son Babji tries to escape from them and runs into Chinna Ogirala But police inspector stops Babji and team and explain not break the rules between two villages Babji return back with disappointment

== Cast ==
- Nagarjuna as Ramaraju
- Harikrishna as Seetayya
- Sakshi Shivanand as Satya
- Sanghavi as Gowri
- Ravi Teja as Seenu
- Chandra Mohan as Raghava Raju
- Kota Srinivasa Rao as Basavaraju
- Ahuti Prasad as Basavaraju's uncle
- Prasad Babu as Intelligence Officer Prasad
- Satya Prakash as Chinna
- Brahmaji as Chandu
- Banerjee as S. I. Prabhakar
- Sivaji as Sivaji
- Sameer as Suri
- Vivekvasu as Kumar
- Kalpana as Lakshmi
- Rajitha
- Apoorva
- Aparnna
- Santhoshini
- Manya as Suma
- Nirmalamma as Basavaraju's grandmother
- Master Raghu Chaitanya as Nani

== Production ==
The film saw Nagarjuna and Harikrishna acting together for first time. The film's launch saw the families of Akkineni Nageswara Rao and N. T. Rama Rao attending the event with Nageswara Rao slapping the clapboard and his wife Annapurna switched on the camera for the first shot. Some scenes were shot at a bungalow situated at Banjara Palace, Begumpet. A village set was erected at Gandhipet.

== Soundtrack ==
Seetharama Raju

Soundtrack album by M. M. Keeravani
- Released: 1999
- Genre: Soundtrack
- Length: 37:50
- Label: Aditya Music
- Producer: M. M. Keeravani

M. M. Keeravani chronology
Sri Sita Ramula Kalyanam Chootamu Raarandi (1998)	Seetharama Raju (1999)	Alludugaaru Vachcharu (1999)

The music was composed by M. M. Keeravani. Lyrics were written by Sirivennela Sitarama Sastry. Music was released on ADITYA Music Company.

No.	Title	Singer(s)	Length
1.	"Changure Changure"	S. P. Balasubrahmanyam, M. M. Keeravani, Radhika, Sarada	5:16
2.	"Sreevaru Doragaaru"	S. P. Balasubrahmanyam, Chitra	6:13
3.	"Ekaseka Tatta"	S. P. Balasubrahmanyam, M. M. Keeravani, Sujatha	5:15
4.	"Ecstacy Privacy"	M. M. Keeravani, Chitra	5:55
5.	"Kundanapu Bommaki"	S. P. Balasubrahmanyam, M. M. Keeravani, S. P. Sailaja	4:52
6.	"Uyalala Uyalala"	M. M. Keeravani	5:01
7.	"Vinudu Vinudu"	Nagarjuna Akkineni, M. M. Srivalli	2:07
Total length:			37:50

== Reception ==
Jayalakshmi K. of Deccan Herald wrote "While Posani Krishnamurali has woven a script that brims with revenge and retribution, lacing it also with a few drops of sentiment, director Y V S Choudhary succeeds in balancing the star images of both Nagarjuna and Harikrishna".

== Accolades ==
Nandi Awards-1999

- Best Character Actress - Nirmalamma
- Best Makeup Artist - Ramachandra Rao
