= Devadasu (2006 film) =

2006 Indian film by Y. V. S. Chowdary

Devdasu
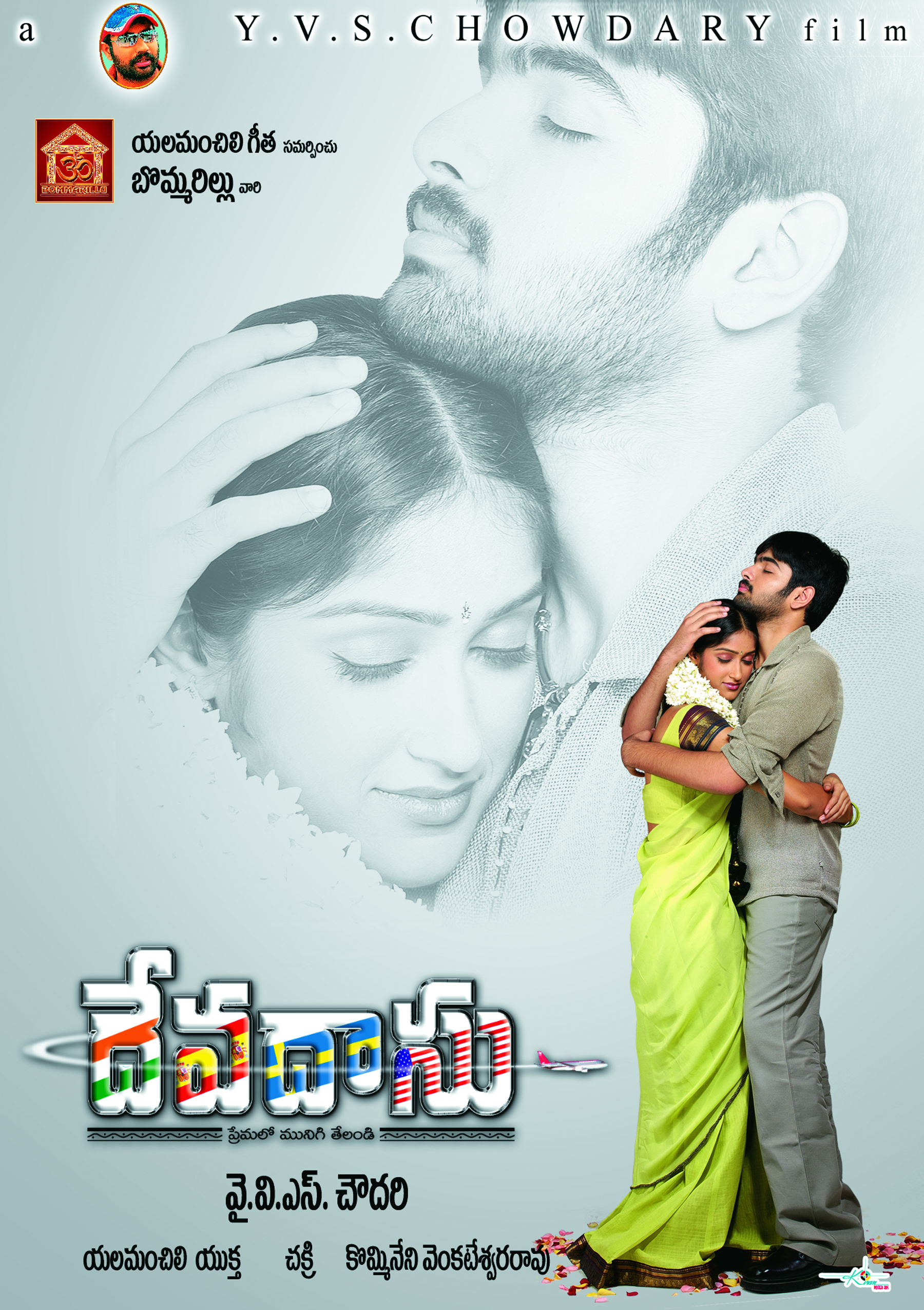
- Directed by: Y. V. Satyanarayana. Chowdary
- Written by: Y. V. S. Chowdary; Chintapalli Ramana (Dialogues)
- Produced by: Y. V. S. Chowdary
- Starring: Ram Pothineni; Ileana D'Cruz; Sayaji Shinde
- Cinematography: Bharani K. Dharan
- Edited by: Kotagiri Venkateswara Rao
- Music by: Chakri
- Release date: 11 January 2006 (India)
- Running time: 174 minutes
- Country: India
- Language: Telugu
- Budget: ₹7 crore
- Box office: ₹14 crore distributors' share

Devadasu is a 2006 Indian Telugu-language romantic drama film directed and produced by Y. V. S. Chowdary. The film features the debutants Ram Pothineni and Ileana D'Cruz in the lead roles while Sayaji Shinde plays the supporting role.

Released on 11 January 2006, the film was commercially successful. Both Ram and Ileana won Filmfare Awards South for Best Debut. The film was remade in Hindi as Loveyatri (2018).

== Plot ==
Devdas is a poor student, while Bhanumati is a rich NRI girl whose father Katamraju is the senator of New York. They fall in love when Bhanu comes to India to learn classical Carnatic music. Coming to know about their love, Katamraju hatches a plan to separate them. He promises to get them married but takes his daughter and mother-in-law back to the USA. The rest of the story is how Devdas makes it to the USA and succeeds in attaining his girl.

== Cast ==
- Ram Pothineni as Devdas
- Ileana D'Cruz as Bhanumati
- Sayaji Shinde as Katamraju
- Rama Prabha as Bhanu's grandmother
- Bhargavi as SRR College student
- Sameer Ali Khan as Bobby
- Venu Madhav as Dev's friend
- M. S. Narayana
- Manuel Drieschmanns as Embassy employee
- Shriya Saran as herself (Cameo)
- Y. V. S. Chowdary as himself (Cameo)
- Chakri as himself (Cameo)

== Soundtrack ==
The music was composed by Chakri and released by Aditya Music with lyrics written by Sirivennela and Chandrabose.

Devadasu

Soundtrack album by Chakri
- Released: 27 November 2005
- Recorded: 2005
- Genre: Soundtrack
- Length: 49:19
- Label: Aditya Music
- Producer: Chakri

Chakri chronology
Bhageeratha (2005)	Devadasu (2005)	Chukkallo Chandrudu (2006)

Track list
No.	Title	Lyrics	Singer(s)	Length
1.	"Bangaram"	Chandrabose	Chakri, Revathi	5:19
2.	"Kshaminchu"	Chandrabose	Kousalya	5:19
3.	"Nuvvantene Istham"	Chandrabose	Chakri	5:55
4.	"Adigi Adagaleka"	Chandrabose	Karthik, Sujatha Mohan	5:18
5.	"Kurrallu"	Chandrabose	Malathy Lakshman	4:45
6.	"Telusa"	Chandrabose	Cherri, Revathi	1:30
7.	"Oka Nestham"	Chandrabose	Karthik, Tina Kamal	4:40
8.	"Aye Babu"	Chandrabose	Anushka Manchanda	4:54
9.	"Gundelni Pindedhi"	Chandrabose	Chakri, Vishwa	4:12
10.	"Idigidigo"	Chandrabose	Simha, Venu	2:18
11.	"Mayadari Chinnodu"	Viswa	Vijaya Lakshmi	5:09
Total length:				49:19

== Box office ==
The film grossed around ₹40 crore. and had a 175-day run in 17 theatres, including a 205-day run in Odeon 70 mm, Hyderabad.

== Awards ==
- Filmfare Award for Best Male Debut - South - Ram
- Filmfare Award for Best Female Debut - South - Ileana D'Cruz
