= Saiyami Kher =

Indian actress (born 1992)

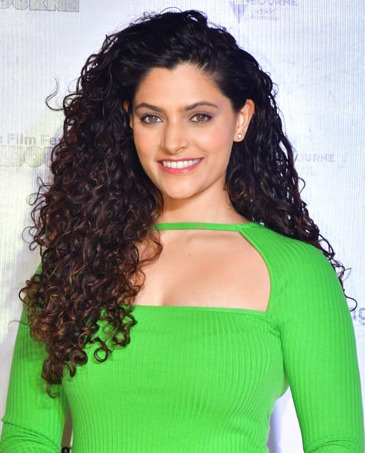
- Kher in 2023
- Born: 29 June 1992 (age 34); Nashik, Maharashtra, India
- Education: St. Xavier's College, Mumbai
- Occupation: Actress
- Years active: 2015–present
- Relatives: Usha Kiran (grandmother); Tanvi Azmi (aunt)

Saiyami Kher (born 29 June 1992) is an Indian actress who primarily works in Hindi and Telugu films. Kher made her acting debut with the Telugu film Rey (2015) and her Hindi debut with Mirzya (2016), for which she received Stardust Award for Superstar of Tomorrow – Female. Kher has since appeared in Mauli (2018), Choked (2020), Wild Dog (2021) and Ghoomer (2023). She has also starred in the streaming series Special OPS (2020) and Faadu (2022).

== Early life and family ==
Kher was born on 29 June 1992 in Nashik, Maharashtra, India. Her father, Advait Kher, was a model, while her mother, Uttara Kher, won the Femina Miss India pageant in 1982. Her older sister, Saunskruti Kher, is also an actress in the Marathi film industry.

She is the granddaughter of actress Usha Kiran and the niece of actress Tanvi Azmi. Kher completed her graduation from St. Xavier's College, Mumbai.

== Career ==
In 2015, Kher made her debut with Telugu film Rey and appeared in Rakesh Omprakash Mehra's Punjabi folklore Mirza Sahiban based Hindi film Mirzya opposite Harshvardhan Kapoor in following the year. In 2020, She appeared in Mayank Sharma's web series Breathe alongside Abhishek Bachchan. In 2021, she starred alongside Nagarjuna in the action film Wild Dog as an NIA Agent.

In 2023, Sayami featured in R. Balki's Ghoomer.

== Filmography ==
Key
†	Denotes films that have not yet been released

=== Films ===
Year	Title	Role	Language	Notes	Ref.
2015	Rey	Amrita	Telugu		
2016	Mirzya	Suchitra	Hindi		
2018	Mauli	Renuka	Marathi		
2020	Choked	Sarita Pillai	Hindi		
2020	Unpaused	Ayesha Hussain	Hindi	Segment: "Glitch"	
2021	Wild Dog	Arya Pandit	Telugu		
2022	Highway	Asha Bharath	Telugu		
2023	8 A.M. Metro	Iravati	Hindi		
2023	Ghoomer	Anina "Ani" Dixit	Hindi		
2024	Sharmajee Ki Beti	Tanvi Sharma	Hindi		
2024	Agni	Avni Purohit	Hindi		
2025	Jaat	SI Vijaya Lakshmi	Hindi		
2026	Uyir	PI Keerthi Deshpande	Malayalam		
2026	Haiwaan	Inspector Varsha Joshi	Hindi		

=== Television ===
Year	Title	Role	Notes	Ref.
2020	Special OPS	Juhi Kashyap	Season 1	
2020	Breathe: Into the Shadows	Shirley	2 seasons	
2022	Faadu	Manjiri		
2025	Special OPS	Juhi Kashyap	Season 2	

== Awards and nominations ==
Year	Award	Category	Work	Result	Ref.
2016	Stardust Awards	Superstar of Tomorrow – Female	Mirzya	Won	
2020	Filmfare OTT Awards	Best Actor Female in Web Original Film	Choked	Nominated	
2024	69th Filmfare Awards	Filmfare Critics Award for Best Actress	Ghoomer	Nominated	
2024	Iconic Gold Awards	Powerpacked Performance of the Year - Female	Ghoomer	Won	

Saiyami Kher's became the first Indian actress to compete in the Ironman 70.3 triathlon in Berlin: The Ironman 70.3 is a triathlon that involves a 1.9 km swim, a 90 km bike ride, and a 21.1 km run, all completed in order without breaks.
