= Autonagar Surya (soundtrack) =

Soundtrack album by Anup Rubens
- Released: 31 January 2014
- Recorded: 2011–2013
- Genre: Feature film soundtrack
- Length: 26:00
- Language: Telugu
- Label: Aditya Music
- Producer: Anup Rubens

Anup Rubens chronology
| Heart Attack (2014) | Autonagar Surya (2014) | Bhimavaram Bullodu (2014) |
External audio
- Official Audio Jukebox on YouTube

Autonagar Surya is the soundtrack album to the 2014 film of the same name directed by Deva Katta starring Naga Chaitanya and Samantha Ruth Prabhu. The film's soundtrack featured seven songs composed by Anup Rubens and lyrics written by Anantha Sriram. The release of the film's soundtrack delayed multiple times due to the film's postponements, before eventually being released on 31 January 2014. The music received mixed response with criticism for its placement, while the background score was well received.

== Development ==
Autonagar Surya marked Rubens' maiden collaboration with Chaitanya and Katta. The film's soundtrack consisted of seven songs, according to Katta, where two of them would be used in the titles and end credits, respectively. The album features an introduction number, two duet numbers, an item number among several others. Rubens worked on the film's music during early-2011 and continued till 2013. He started working on re-recording the film's background score and completed within a month.

== Release ==
The music launch was delayed multiple times, which was attributed to the film's production troubles. Initially, it was scheduled during the last week of September 2013, which did not happen. After filming of the last song featuring Chaitanya and Samantha, the producers planned to conduct the film's music launch on the occasion of Chaitanya's birthday, 23 November 2013. But by mid-November, they had one more song to be filmed, which was the item number "Hyderabadi Biriyani", which led the team to postpone the event to 30 November; the same day, the film's production has been wrapped. After the post-production process, Katta confirmed that the film's music will be launched on 9 January 2014. But was again postponed to 13 January, the eve of Makar Sankranti, which also did not happen.

A press note was released by producer Atchi Reddy on 19 January, that the film's music would be launched at an event on 31 January at Shilpakala Vedika in Hyderabad. The rights for the soundtrack album were purchased and marketed by Aditya Music. The track list was released on 30 January 2014, through Aditya Music's social media page. The audio launch was held on 31 January 2014. Apart from the film's cast and crew, the other members who attended the event were Sukumar and Sharwanand, with Rana Daggubati as the chief guest.

== Reception ==
Upon release, the album received mixed-to-positive response from the critics. Karthik Srinivasan of Milliblog described the soundtrack as a "mixed bag". Sangeetha Devi Dundoo of The Hindu reviewed that while "few songs look sorely out of place", she complimented the background score as it "add to the intensity". Suresh Kavirayani of Deccan Chronicle wrote "Anoop Rubens' music has not hit the mark and the songs are average." Karthik Pasupulate of The Times of India called the music to be "run-of-the-mill" and the background score to be the "other bright spot in an otherwise mediocre product."

== Track listing ==
All lyrics are written by Ananta Sriram.

| No. | Title | Artist(s) | Length |
|---|---|---|---|
| 1. | "Time Entha Raa" | Vijay Prakash, Chorus | 4:41 |
| 2. | "Mancheli" | Anup Rubens | 4:18 |
| 3. | "Autonagar Brahmi" | Brahmanandam, Venu Madhav, Anup Rubens, Sai Charan, Amurtha Varshini, Pranathi | 4:00 |
| 4. | "Sura Sura" | Chaitra, Anup Rubens, Santhosh, Ramki | 4:20 |
| 5. | "Hyderabad Biryani" | Ritu Pathak, Chorus | 4:08 |
| 6. | "Aayudham" | Deva Katta, Siddharth, Raghu | 2:49 |
| 7. | "Theme Song" | Anup Rubens | 1:41 |
| Total length: | | | 26:00 |
