= Srinagar Colony =

Neighbourhood in Hyderabad, Telangana, India

- Neighbourhood
- Location in Andhra Pradesh, India Srinagar Colony (Telangana) Srinagar Colony (India)
- Coordinates: 17.416471°N 78.438247°E
- Country: India
- State: Telangana
- District: Hyderabad
- Metro: Hyderabad

Government
  - Body: GHMC

Languages
  - Official: Telugu
- Time zone: UTC+5:30 (IST)
- PIN: 500 073
- Lok Sabha constituency: Secunderabad Lok Sabha constituency
- Vidhan Sabha constituency: Khairatabad Assembly constituency
- Planning agency: GHMC

Srinagar Colony is an important commercial and residential area in the western part of Hyderabad, Telangana, India. It formed Ward No. 104 of Greater Hyderabad Municipal Corporation in 2009.

Because the area is close to Madhapur, with many working software professionals, it is a popular residential area, with a growing number of higher-valued flats. The area has also seen a large increase in real estate prices in recent years.

== Commercial area ==
There are many banks, supermarkets and restaurants located in this suburb. There are many software companies which have made Srinagar colony their base. Many malls and theatres like RK Cineplex (PVR RK Cineplex), Hyderabad Central, PVR Cinemas, Big Bazaar (Big Cinemas), Cinemax, and GVK One (Inox) are within 1 to 2 km distance. Ameerpet is very close, which is a major shopping center also a capital of Software training. Most of them have made Srinagar colony their residence.

== Residential area ==
Srinagar Colony of Hyderabad is a posh suburban neighbourhood to the west of Hyderabad, Telangana. It is one of the best residential location in the city with rental prices up to Rs.60,000.00 for a three-bedroom flat (furnished flats rent for up to Rs.70,000.00). Most building in the area are five floors, with lot of small parks along the road. Ganapathi Complex is very famous meeting place for television stars. This landmark is known for its many artists of cinema and television stars.

== Transport ==
The buses run by TGSRTC connect Srinagar colony to all parts of the city. There is also a mini-bus service called as Setwin service. The closest MMTS Train station is at Begumpet. The nearest metro stations are Yousufguda Metro Station, Road No. 5 Jubilee Hills Metro Station and Ameerpet Metro Station.
