= Nijam With Smita =

Indian talk-show

- Genre: Talk show
- Created by: Smita
- Written by: Anantha Sriram; Murthy Devagupthapu
- Directed by: Kiran Jay Kumar
- Presented by: Smita
- Country of origin: India
- Original language: Telugu
- No. of seasons: 1
- No. of episodes: 10

Production
- Executive producer: Shyam Sharma M
- Producer: Smita
- Cinematography: Subramanian Gnanam
- Editors: DG; M Rajasekhar; Manideepak; K Vijaya Kumar
- Camera setup: Multi-camera

Original release
- Network: SonyLIV
- Release: 10 February – 23 April 2024

Nijam With Smita is an Indian Telugu-language streaming television talk show produced and hosted by Smita. It was premiered on 10 February 2023 on SonyLIV.

== Production ==
Filming of the episodes were done September and October 2022, but is premiered in February 2023. The introduction title song was shot separately. Sameer Reddy is the cinematographer with Mickey J. Meyer composing the music. Bosco Martis and Vijay Binni are the dance choreographers of the song. A closing song is presented at the end of every episode. Each song is based on the theme of the episode.

== Episodes ==
| Episode | Title | Premiere | Guest(s) |
|---|---|---|---|
| 1 | "Upward Mobility" | 10 February 2024 | Chiranjeevi |
| 2 | "Development Vs Populism" | 16 February 2024 | N. Chandrababu Naidu |
| 3 | "Nepotism – Boon or Bane" | 23 February 2024 | Rana Daggubati, Nani |
| 4 | "Sport And Beyond" | 2 March 2024 | Pullela Gopichand, Sudheer Babu |
| 5 | "The Lady Super Star" | 9 March 2024 | Sai Pallavi |
| 6 | "Influence Of Cinema. The Good, Bad, And Ugly." | 16 March 2024 | Deva Katta, Sandeep Reddy Vanga |
| 7 | "Brave Hearts Of India" | 23 March 2024 | Adivi Sesh, Major Bharath Reddy |
| 8 | "The Power of Humour" | 30 March 2024 | Anil Ravipudi, Allari Naresh |
| 9 | "Religion and The Secular Fabric of India" | 6 April 2024 | Jaya Prakash Narayana, Ram Madhav |
| 10 | "Powerful Women Behind The Screen" | 13 February 2024 | Radhika, Supriya Yarlagadda, Swapna Dutt |

== Music ==
Track list
| No. | Title | Lyrics | Music | Singer(s) | Length |
|---|---|---|---|---|---|
| 1. | "Title Song" | Rahman | Mickey J. Meyer | Smita |
| 2. | "Episode 1 Closing Song" | Anantha Sriram | Saketh Komanduri | A. Yashwanth Nag |
| 3. | "Episode 2 Closing Song" | Anantha Sriram | Saketh Komanduri | Vinod, Vinuthna |
| 4. | "Episode 3 Closing Song" | Anantha Sriram, MaaHaa | Saketh Komanduri | MaaHaa |
| 5. | "Episode 4 Closing Song" | Anantha Sriram | Saketh Komanduri | Roll Rida, Saketh Komanduri |
| 6. | "Episode 5 Closing Song" | Anantha Sriram | Saketh Komanduri | Sri Krishna |
| 7. | "Episode 6 Closing Song" | Anantha Sriram | Saketh Komanduri | Bharat Raj |
| 8. | "Episode 7 Closing Song" | Anantha Sriram | Saketh Komanduri | Little Musicians Academy Students |
| 9. | "Episode 8 Closing Song" | Anantha Sriram | Saketh Komanduri | L. V. Revanth |
| 10. | "Episode 9 Closing Song" | Anantha Sriram | Saketh Komanduri | Parnika Manya, Prudhvi Chandra |
| 11. | "Episode 10 Closing Song" | – | Saketh Komanduri | Smita, Shivani, Keerthana |
