= Kamina (film) =

Telugu-language film

- Directed by: Lakshmikanth Chenna
- Starring: Sai Kumar; Subbaraju; Krishi Arimanda; Brahmaji; Ravi Babu; Ashish Vidyarthi; Roja; Lekha Washington
- Cinematography: Jawahar Reddy
- Edited by: Lokesh
- Music by: Agastya
- Release date: 13 September 2013
- Country: India
- Language: Telugu

Kamina is a 2013 Indian Telugu-language crime thriller film directed by Lakshmikanth Chenna and featuring Sai Kumar, Subbaraju, Krishi Arimanda, Brahmaji, Ravi Babu, Ashish Vidyarthi, Roja and Lekha Washington in important roles. It is the Telugu remake of the 2007 Bollywood film Johnny Gaddar. The film was shot in Ghatkesar, Hyderabad and Bangalore.

== Cast ==
- Sai Kumar as Dharma
- Subbaraju as Siva
- Krishi Arimanda as Siddharth "Siddhu"
- Brahmaji as Kailash
- Ravi Babu as Kalyan
- Ashish Vidyarthi as Teja
- Roja
- Lekha Washington as Vasuki
- Ruby Parihar as Samiksha
- Ravi Babu
- Telangana Shakuntala
- Hema as Manager Mani Moli Maran
- Prabhas Sreenu as Siddhu's friend

== Soundtrack ==
Soundtrack composed by Agastya was released through Aditya Music.

Track list
No.	Title	Lyrics	Singer(s)	Length
1.	"Kamina Theme Song"	Chirravuri Vijay Kumar	Bhargavi Pillai	2:50
2.	"Aata Paata"	Krishna Kanth	Agastya	2:31
3.	"Inkaa Yemi Cheppalo"	Anantha Sriram	Sahithi, Prudhvi	4:32
4.	"Niga Niga Thoorupe"	Chirravuri Vijay Kumar	Anuja	3:00
5.	"Kamina Title Music"	Instrumental	Agastya	2:48
6.	"Nuvvu Nuvvu Nuvvey"	Ramajogayya Sastry	Sunidhi Chauhan	4:17
Total length:				19:59

== Reception ==
A critic from The Times of India wrote that "It’s a yawn fest, watch it only if you are in the mood to well, doze". A critic from India Herald wrote that "It has been a while since Chenna made a film in Telugu and it is obvious that he underestimates the viewer’s here. It is a simple story that unveils at a leisurely pace and often, in a disturbingly and predictable way".
