= Ruby Parihar =

Indian actress

- Born: New Delhi, India
- Occupations: Actress, model
- Years active: 2009–2019

Ruby Parihar is a former Indian actress who works in Telugu, Hindi and Kannada-language films.

== Career ==
Originally from Delhi, her first role was in the Telugu film Prasthanam (2010), directed by Deva Katta where she co-starred with Sharwanand. She subsequently appeared in the Kannada film Yaksha (2010) opposite Yogesh. Her role in both films were labelled as minor by critics and were limited to songs.

== Filmography ==
Year	Film	Role	Language
2009	Prasthanam	Latha	Telugu
2010	Yaksha	Unnamed	Kannada
2013	Kamina	Samiksha	Telugu
2014	Premalo ABC	Swapna	Telugu
2014	Rudrakshapalli		Telugu
2014	It's My Life		Telugu
2015	Gabbar Is Back	Varsha	Hindi
2019	V for Victor		Hindi
