= Valasa =

- Directed by: Deva Katta
- Produced by: Sachi Pinagapani
- Cinematography: Sachi Pinagapani; Deva Katta
- Edited by: Sachi Pinagapani; Deva Katta
- Country: United States
- Language: Telugu

Valasa (transl. Migration) is an unreleased Telugu-language documentary film directed by Deva Katta. The film is about the lives of Indian students who go abroad to the United States for college.

== Production ==
Deva Katta worked on this film while working in an automobile company as a mechanical engineer. The film was produced by Deva Katta's friend Sachi Pinagapani, who also worked as a cameraman and editor alongside Katta. The film starred Katta's colleagues and roommates. The film began production in 1999 as an 18-episode low-budget television serial shot in Detroit on a Panasonic MiniDV camcorder during the weekends in winter. The film was shot for around a year. Ravi Varma auditioned for one of the lead roles in 2000 but was not selected. Katta edited the film using Adobe Premiere. Since Katta was not satisfied with the final cut due to technical issues, he shortened the serial into a two hour film in 2003.

== Future ==
Katta used Valasa as the basis of his feature film debut Vennela (2005), co-produced by Sachi Pinagapani, which additionally included a love story.
