= Parvati Melton =

American actress

- Born: California, United States
- Occupations: Actress; model
- Years active: 2004–2013
- Spouse: Shamsu Lalani (m. 2012)

Parvati Melton is an American model and actress known for her works in Indian Telugu and Malayalam-language films. She was a 2004 Miss Teen India Bay Area winner and is a trained ballet and classical Indian dancer.

She debuted in the film industry with the Telugu film Vennela (2005) starring Raja, which turned out to be a success. She acted in the blockbuster Malayalam film Hallo (2007) with Mohanlal. She again shot to fame with the item song "Poovai Poovai" in Telugu film Dookudu (2011) opposite Mahesh Babu.

== Early life and career ==
Parvati was born in San Francisco, California to a German/Scottish father Sam Melton and an Indian Punjabi mother Preity Singh. She has one younger sister Ariana Sitara Melton. She is a trained Bharatanatyam dancer and was a professional figure skater. She graduated from Emeryville High School and attended Vista Community College in Berkeley, California. She won several beauty pageants like the Miss Teen India Bay Area pageant in 2004 and the Miss India Le Visage USA pageant in 2005. She participated in Hindi and Punjabi pop albums. While still studying in Vista College, she was offered the lead role in the Telugu film Vennela. Although she intended to go back to school after the project, the film's success kept her away.

She married Shamsu Lalani, a real estate businessman, in 2012 and subsequently retired from films.

== Filmography ==
Year	Film	Role	Language	Notes
2005	Vennela	Pavani	Telugu	Telugu Debut
2006	Game	Swetha	Telugu	
2007	Madhumasam	Maya	Telugu	
2007	Hallo	Parvathi	Malayalam	Malayalam Debut
2007	Allare Allari	Swathi	Telugu	
2007	Flash	Midhun's wife	Malayalam	Cameo appearance
2008	Gautama Buddha	Prerana	Telugu	
2008	Tathagatha Buddha	Prerana	Hindi	Hindi debut
2008	Jalsa	Jyotsna	Telugu	Nominated – Filmfare Award for Best Supporting Actress – Telugu
2011	Dookudu	Dancer	Telugu	Item number in "Poovai Poovai" song
2012	Srimannarayana	Swapnika	Telugu	
2012	Yamaho Yama	Swapna	Telugu	
2026	Raktha Kashmira	Sasikala	Kannada	
