= Yaksha (2010 film) =

- DVD cover
- Directed by: Ramesh Bhagawathar
- Screenplay by: Ramesh Bhagawathar
- Produced by: T.P. Siddaraju
- Starring: Yogesh; Ruby Parihar; Nana Patekar
- Cinematography: Chandrashekhar
- Music by: J. Anoop Seelin
- Production company: Samy Associates
- Release date: 29 October 2010
- Country: India
- Language: Kannada

Yaksha is a 2010 Indian Kannada-language action drama film directed by Ramesh Bhagawathar and starring Yogesh, Ruby Parihar and Nana Patekar in his Kannada debut.

The film was released on 29 October 2010.

== Cast ==
- Yogesh as Yaksha Raj Pulikeshi
- Ruby Parihar
- Nana Patekar as Yograj Pulakeshi
- Atul Kulkarni as Machendranath Poonja
- Saranya Ponvannan as Yaksha's mother
- Kishore
- Master Hirannaiah as Yaksha's grandfather
- Komal
- Mahesh
- Sudhakara Bannanje
- Girish Mattannavar
- GK Govinda Rao

== Production ==
Pranitha Subhash was initially considered to play the heroine.

== Soundtrack ==
The music of the film is composed by J. Anoop Seelin.

Track listing
No.	Title	Singer(s)	Length
1.	"Om Namaha"	Anoop Seelin, Ritisha	4:27
2.	"Nanna Iniyana (Remix)"	Shamitha Malnad	5:08
3.	"Yaksha"	Megha, Anoop Seelin	4:34
4.	"Om Namaha (Remix)"	Anoop Seelin, Ritisha	4:24
5.	"Santhosha Ondu Kade"	Anoop Seelin	1:16
6.	"Aunty Kelu Anthapura"	Kailash Kher	3:55
7.	"Rakachik Takachik"	Vijay Prakash	3:48
8.	"Nanna Iniyana"	Ritisha	3:58
Total length:			31:39

== Reception ==
A critic from Rediff.com wrote that "In short, Yaksha has nothing to offer.". A critic from IANS wrote that "Except for its dance picturisation and good visuals, Yaksha is an ordinary fare which can be enjoyed by Yogish's ardent fans". A critic from Chitraloka.com wrote that "A film that is sure to endear Yogish to his fans more".
