= Raktha Kashmira =

Indian Kannada-language adventure drama film

- Theatrical release poster
- Directed by: Rajendra Singh Babu
- Screenplay by: Rajendra Singh Babu
- Story by: Rajendra Singh Babu
- Produced by: MDM Productions
- Starring: Upendra; Ramya; Parvati Melton
- Cinematography: Manohar Joshi
- Edited by: Deepu S. Kumar
- Music by: Gurukiran
- Production company: MDM Productions
- Distributed by: Mars Suresh; Vishala Karnataka
- Release date: 30 January 2026
- Running time: 133 minutes
- Country: India
- Language: Kannada

Raktha Kashmira is a 2026 Indian Kannada-language adventure drama film written and directed by S. V. Rajendra Singh Babu. Produced by MDM productions, the film was announced and launched in 2007 and underwent significant production delays, spanning over eighteen years and was in development hell before the makers announced the release date in 2025. The film stars Upendra and Ramya in the lead roles. The music is composed by Gurukiran and cinematography is handled by Manohar Joshi.

The film's plot revolves around the aftermath impact of terror attacks on citizens in the Azad Jammu and Kashmir disputed areas One of the film's highlight is reported to be a 18-minute song featuring leading stars of Kannada cinema including Vishnuvardhan, Srinath, Ambareesh, Shiva Rajkumar, Ramesh Aravind, Puneeth Rajkumar, Jaggesh, Darshan and Aditya.

The film was theatrically released on 30 January 2026 across Karnataka.

== Premise ==
Raktha Kashmira follows the story of a stunt trainer who runs a school for orphans. His peaceful life takes a dramatic turn when his students accidentally uncover terrorist bombing plans. The terrorists abduct the children and take them to Kashmir, forcing the protagonist into a high‑risk rescue mission. Alongside a strong emotional subplot involving his love interest, the story expands into a larger anti‑terror narrative inspired by alleged real‑world incidents in Azad Jammu and Kashmir and terror attacks in Indian cities such as Bengaluru, highlighting the impact of terrorism on ordinary citizens.

== Cast ==
- Upendra as Devendra and Bheema
- Ramya as Nandhini, Bheema's love interest
- Parvati Melton as Sasikala, An actress
- Mukesh Rishi
- Doddanna
- Om Prakash Rao
- Kuri Prathap
- Anil

=== Special appearance in the song "Star Star" ===
- Vishnuvardhan
- Ambareesh
- Puneeth Rajkumar
- Shiva Rajkumar
- Darshan
- Jaggesh
- Aditya
- Ramesh Aravind
- Srinath
- Jai Jagadish

== Soundtrack ==
Raktha Kashmira

Soundtrack album by Gurukiran
- Released: 2026
- Recorded: 2007
- Genre: Feature film soundtrack
- Language: Kannada
- Producer: Gurukiran

The film's soundtrack is composed by Gurukiran, with Kaviraj writing the lyrics. The music rights are associated with Vedasya Music, which has released the trailer.

Track listing
No.	Title	Lyrics	Singer(s)	Length
1.	"Kashmira"	Kaviraj	Srinivas, K. S. Chithra	4:39
2.	"Bang Bang India"	Kaviraj	Mame Khan	1:23
3.	"Star Star"	Kaviraj	S. P. Balasubrahmanyam	18:02
4.	"Buguri"	Shekharappa Huligiri	Rajesh Krishnan	4:02
5.	"Iruve"	Siddakatti Chandrarajashetti	Nanditha	4:12
6.	"Maya Bazar"	Kaviraj	Mano, Malgudi Subha, Nanditha	4:34
7.	"Just Bang Bang"	Kaviraj	Gurukiran	4:22
Total length:				35:02

== Release ==
Raktha Kashmira was theatrically released across Karnataka on 30 January 2026, after repeated delays spanning nearly two decades. Distribution is handled by Mars Suresh and Vishala Karnataka, who have earlier collaborated with director Rajendra Singh Babu.

== Reception ==
Susmita Sameera of The Times of India said that "Raktha Kashmira does not fully come together as a patriotic action drama, with its uneven tone and dated presentation holding it back. For Kannada cinema fans, the highlight lies in a special song that brings together multiple stars, an era that can no longer be recreated, but can at least be witnessed for a few minutes through this film."
