= Game (2006 film) =

- Aata Modalaindhi (English: The game starts now)
- Directed by: Ramprasad G.
- Written by: Ramprasad G.(screenplay); Marudhuri Raja (Dialogues)
- Story by: Rajat Arora
- Based on: Taxi No. 9211 by Milan Luthria
- Produced by: Mohan Babu
- Starring: Mohan Babu; Vishnu Manchu; Shobana; Parvati Melton
- Cinematography: B. Balamurugan
- Edited by: Gautham Raju
- Music by: Joshua Sridhar
- Distributed by: Sri Lakshmi Prasanna Pictures
- Release date: 5 August 2006
- Running time: 130 minutes
- Country: India
- Language: Telugu

Game is a 2006 Telugu-language slice-of-life drama film directed by Ramprasad G. It stars Mohan Babu and Vishnu Manchu in lead roles with Shobana, Parvati Melton, Sumalatha and Giri Babu in supporting roles. The film's background score and soundtrack were composed by music composer, Joshua Sridhar. The soundtrack for the movie was released on 27 July 2006. The movie is a remake of Hindi movie Taxi No. 9211 (2006), which itself is based on the Hollywood movie Changing Lanes. Game received negative reviews and failed at the box office. The film marked Shobana's return to Telugu films almost after a decade and eventually, this film ended up being her last Telugu film, until the release of Kalki 2898 AD in 2024.

== Plot ==
It follows the chaotic, interwoven day of two entirely different men desperate for money. Pandit Raghava (played by Mohan Babu) is a short-tempered cab driver in Hyderabad who lies to his family that he is an insurance agent, needing a few thousand rupees to clear pressing debts. Vijay Raj (played by Vishnu Manchu) is a spoiled, wealthy youth rushing to a crucial court hearing to claim a multi-crore inheritance from his late father. When Vijay hires Raghava's taxi, a series of arguments, accidents, and ego clashes spark a bitter rivalry between the two. As the day descends into a fast-paced battle of wits and retaliation, the two men deliberately sabotage each other's goals, only to eventually realize their mutual dependency and the devastating consequences of their pride.

== Cast ==
- Mohan Babu as Pandit Raghava, Taxi driver
- Vishnu Manchu as Vijay Raj
- Shobana as Uma, Pandit Raghava's wife
- Parvati Melton as Swetha, Vijay Raj's partner
- Sunil as Kulkarni, bank employee
- Giri Babu as Rama Chandra Murthy
- Shriya Saran as Vijay Raj's girlfriend (Special Appearance)
- Brahmanandam as Raghava's boss
- Posani Krishna Murali as Raghava's ex boss
- Raghu Babu as Police Officer
- Satyam Rajesh as Inspector Subba Rao
- Subbaraju as Police Officer
- Ravi Prakash as Vijay Raj's friend
- Tanikella Bharani as Lawyer
- Harsha Vardhan as a person with whose vehicle Raghava's vehicle meets an accident
- Sumalatha as Judge

== Soundtrack ==
Music by Joshua Sridhar.

- "Ataladukundam" – Karthik, Balaji, Joshua Sridhar
- "Uyyale Uyyale" – Karthik, Balaji, Joshua Sridhar
- "Ata Modalaindi" – Joshua Sridhar
- "Uyyale Uyyale" – Karthik, Suchitra, Joshua Sridhar
- "Nee Thone Nuvvu" – S. P. Balasubrahmanyam, Joshua Sridhar
- "Masthu Mega City" – Karthik, Joshua Sridhar
