= Smita =

Indian singer and actress (born 1980)

- Also known as: Smitha, Smiths
- Born: Smita Vallurupalli; 4 September 1980 (age 46); Vijayawada, Andhra Pradesh, India
- Genres: Indi-pop, playback singing
- Occupations: Singer, actress, television anchor and businesswoman
- Website: SmitaPop.com

Smita Vallurupalli (born 4 September 1980), known mononymously as Smita, is an Indian singer and actress. She began her career in 2000 with the release of her debut pop album, Hai Rabba. She has since released several albums, including Masaka Masaka, which was commercially successful, and Smita, a multilingual pop album composed by Sajid-Wajid and distributed by Sony BMG.

In addition to her work in pop music, Smita has performed over 75 playback songs in Telugu cinema. Notably, her rendition of "Evaraina Chusuntara" from the film Anukokunda Oka Roju (2005) earned her the Filmfare Award for Best Female Playback Singer – Telugu. She is credited with popularizing pop music in Andhra Pradesh through her albums and music videos.

Smita has also ventured into acting, appearing in films such as Malliswari (2004) and Aata (2007). In 2015, she starred in the short film Dying To Be Me. Beyond her music and acting career, she hosted the SonyLIV talk show Nijam With Smita.

== Career ==
=== Singing ===
Smita's potential as a singer was identified at a talent show Padutha Theeyaga on Telugu television channel ETV anchored by S. P. Balasubrahmanyam in 1997. Smita's mother sent her singing tape secretly to Padutha Theeyaga. Around this time she started trying for some playback opportunities and she did get to sing a few playback songs. Her parents advised her that it was more apt to choose pop singing as a career as she had a style which is more suited for making of a pop artist. Hairabba was a result of this decision.

=== Other works ===
Her career as a pop artist started in the year 2000 with the launch of her first album "Hai Rabba". This album was followed by several blockbuster albums in Telugu and Tamil. Some of her albums in Telugu club mix have crossed sales of over one million copies with special mention to albums like "Masaka Masaka". Over the last seven years Smita has sung over seventy five playback songs in Telugu and has worked with leading music composers from the south.

The song "Evaraina Chusuntara" from the film Anukokunda Oka Roju, composed by M. M. Keeravani, won her the Filmfare Award for Best Female Playback Singer in Telugu for the year 2005. Many albums followed and became blockbusters. She created a market for pop music in Andhra Pradesh and Tamil Nadu and kept the Pop music alive for almost a decade now.

The recently launched album "SMITA" has nine tracks and the music has been composed by the hit duo – Sajid Wajid (of Partner & Welcome fame) and video directed and choreographed by the country's leading choreographers Bosco-Caesar. It has been released in Hindi and Tamil by the leading music company Sony BMG. The pop album is available in stores from 7 May.

In "SMITA", racy dance numbers like the first video single "Mahi Ve" which was shot on a huge set where multiple set-ups including a 20 feet wide 'lotus pool' was constructed as a part of the set, in which Smita was seated and completed in a matter of only 2 days with a troupe of 8 professional British dancers. This will be followed shortly by the second video 'Aaja Nachle', which is a hip-hopish dance number. The album also includes seductive and mischievous tracks like "Ouch" to the soothing romantic ballads "Zara Zara" and "Saawariya", followed by "Dholna" which showcases Smita's dexterity across genres and emotions.

Smita's Pop Album "Mahi ve" Titled as "Maayavi" in Tamil is wide popular in Tamil Nadu as it has been a huge hit in Tamil Nadu.

== Ishana ==
Smita released her album Ishana – the path of the divine on 29 February 2012, at a media event in Hyderabad. An Isha volunteer since 2009, Smita made the album as an offering to Sadhguru and Isha Foundation. Created for a cause, the entire proceeds from the sale of the album will go to support Isha Foundation's work in the areas of education, environment and rural initiatives.

Along with the album, two videos were also launched during the meet. The album has six audio songs and two videos that were shot at the Isha Yoga Center, primarily at the Dhyanalinga and Linga Bhairavi temples. Music for the album was composed by Nihal and the videos were directed by acclaimed cinematographer Sameer Reddy and photographer Tarun Khiwal. Film personalities M. M. Keeravani and Brahmanandam attended the music launch, while the video launch featured cinema figures S. S. Rajamouli, Krish Jagarlamudi, and Siddharth.
