= Ravi Varma (East Godavari actor) =

Indian actor (born 1975)

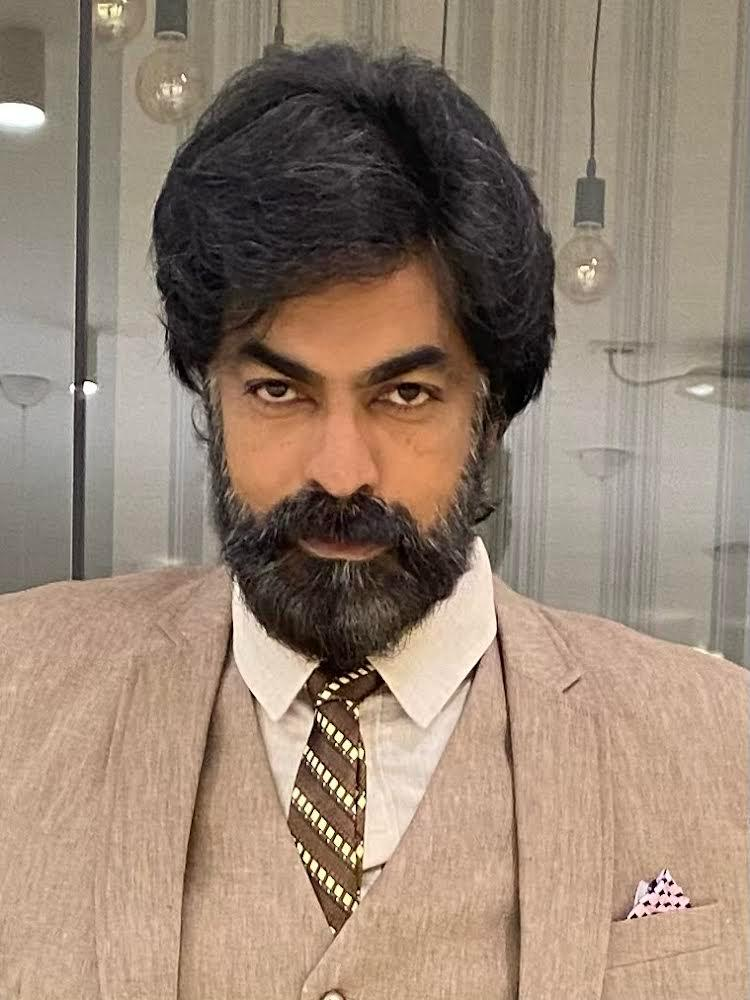
- Born: Ravi Varma Rudraraju; 29 September 1975 (age 50); East Godavari District, Andhra Pradesh, India
- Other names: Vennela Ravi Varma, Rakhi Ravi Varma
- Education: Chaitanya Bharathi Institute of Technology; New York Film Academy
- Occupation: Actor
- Years active: 2005–present

Ravi Varma (born 29 September 1975) is an Indian actor who appears in Telugu films. Known for playing supporting roles, he debuted as an actor with Vennela (2005), directed by Deva Katta.

== Early life and career ==
Varma was born in East Godavari District, Andhra Pradesh, India and brought up in Hyderabad, since 2 years of age. After high school, he studied engineering at CBIT in Hyderabad and went to New York City to finish his master's degree and found a job at Rediff. Varma enrolled in a 3-month course at New York Film Academy. Later, he was offered the role of Syed in Vennela in 2005. He debuted in Tamil with Sathya, which was a remake of Kshanam.

== Filmography ==
- Vennela (2005)
- Rakhi (2006)
- Sainikudu (2006)
- Bommarillu (2006)
- Nuvve (2006)
- Classmates (2007)
- Naa Manasukemaindi (2007)
- Bhadradri (2008)
- Nagaram (2008)
- Ready (2008)
- Jalsa (2008)
- Inkosaari (2010)
- Virodhi (2011)
- Chinna Cinema (2013)
- 1 (2014)
- Weekend Love (2014)
- Boochamma Boochodu (2014)
- Ala Ela (2014)
- Tungabhadra (2015)
- Calling Bell (2015)
- Asura (2015)
- Srimanthudu (2015)
- Dying to Be Me (2015) (short film)
- Kshanam (2016)
- Terror (2016)
- Raja Cheyyi Vesthe (2016)
- Jayammu Nischayammu Raa (2016)
- Appatlo Okadundevadu (2016)
- Ghazi (2017)
- Fashion Designer s/o Ladies Tailor (2017)
- PSV Garuda Vega (2017)
- Balakrishnudu (2017)
- Napoleon (2017)
- Sathya (2017) (Tamil)
- Pantham (2018)
- Taxiwaala (2018)
- Kartha Karma Kriya (2018)
- 24 Kisses (2018)
- Vinaya Vidheya Rama (2019)
- Mithai (2019)
- Udyama Simham (2019)
- Nuvvu Thopu Raa (2019)
- Rajdooth (2019)
- Saaho (2019)
- Raagala 24 Gantallo (2019)
- Entha Manchivaadavuraa (2020)
- Pressure Cooker (2020)
- HIT: The First Case (2020)
- 47 Days (2020)
- Valayam (2020)
- Uppena (2021)
- Thellavarithe Guruvaram (2021)
- Mosagallu (2021)
- Pachchis (2021)
- Kanabadutaledu (2021)
- Ichata Vahanamulu Niluparadu (2021)
- Republic (2021)
- Maa Oori Polimera (2021)
- Alanti Sitralu (2021)
- Bheemla Nayak (2022)
- Bhala Thandanana (2022)
- The Ghost (2022)
- Neetho (2022)
- Valentine's Night (2023)
- Michael (2023)
- Spy (2023)
- Gandeevadhari Arjuna (2023)
- Prema Vimanam (2023)
- Maa Oori Polimera 2 (2023)
- Krishna Rama (2023)
- Extra Ordinary Man (2023)
- RAM (Rapid Action Mission) (2024)
- Inti No. 13 (2024)
- Satyabhama (2024)
- Honeymoon Express (2024) as Vineeth Sharma
- Hathya (2025) as J. C. Dharmendra Reddy
- Pourusham (2025)
- Blind Spot (2025) as Jayaram
- Eleven (2025)
- Constable (2025)
- Paanch Minar (2025)
- Cheekatilo (2026)

=== Television ===
- SIN (2020); Aha
- 11th Hour (2021); Aha
- Loser (2021); ZEE5
- 9 Hours (2022); Disney+ Hotstar
- Hello World (2022); ZEE5
- Bad Trip (2023); SonyLIV
- Parampara (Season 2); Disney+ Hotstar
- Athidhi (2023); Disney+ Hotstar
- Maya Bazaar For Sale (2023); ZEE5
- Arabia Kadali (2025); Amazon Prime Video
- The Family Man (2025); Amazon Prime Video
