= Alanti Sitralu =

2021 Indian Telugu-language film by Supreeth C Krishna

- Theatrical release poster
- Directed by: Supreeth C Krishna
- Written by: Supreeth C Krishna
- Produced by: Rahul Reddy D; Lokku Sri Varun; C Sree Ramulu Reddy
- Starring: Tanvi Akaanksha; Ajay Kumar Kathurvar; Shwetta Parashar; Yash Puri; Dayanand Reddy; Ravi Varma; Prawin Yendamuri
- Cinematography: Karthik Saikumar
- Edited by: Ashwath Shivkumar
- Music by: Santhu Omkar
- Production companies: I & I Arts; Cosmicray Productions
- Release date: 24 September 2021
- Running time: 141 minutes
- Country: India
- Language: Telugu

Alanti Sitralu is a 2021 Indian Telugu-language adult drama film directed by Supreeth C Krishna, under the banners of I & I Arts and Cosmicray Productions. The film features Tanvi Akaanksha, Ajay Kumar Kathurvar, Shwetta Parashar, Yash Puri, and Dayanand Reddy in prominent roles, alongside Ravi Varma and Prawin Yendamuri.

== Cast ==
- Tanvi Akaanksha
- Ajay Kumar Kathurvar
- Shwetta Parashar
- Yash Puri
- Dayanand Reddy
- Ravi Varma
- Prawin Yendamuri

== Plot ==
The story follows the lives of four distinct characters, a ruthless gangster, an aspiring boxer, a struggling prostitute, and a passionate guitarist.

== Production ==
Alanti Sitralu was directed by Supreeth C Krishna, who also served as one of the producers alongside Rahul Reddy, and Lokku Srivarun, under the banners of I&I Arts, Cosmicray Productions. The film's production design was handled by Rohan Singh, while Karthik Sai Kumar took charge of cinematography. Santhu Omkar composed the film's music, The editing was done by Ashwath Shiva Kumar, who also contributed to the sound department.

== Soundtrack ==
All the lyrics were penned by Lakshmi Priyanka, where Santhu Omkar scored all the songs of the film, and the musical rights were bagged by Aditya Music

No.	Title	Lyrics	Singer(s)	Length
1.	"Arere"	Lakshmi Priyanka	Santhya Narayanan	3:14
2.	"Kanulalo"	Lakshmi Priyanka	Santhu Omkar	3:25
3.	"On Your Way"	Lakshmi Priyanka	Santhu Omkar	3:25
4.	"Hear me (Naked Song)"	Lakshmi Priyanka	Santhu Omkar	1:17
5.	"Some People"	Lakshmi Priyanka	Stevie Joe	3:56
Total length:				15:18

== Release ==
Alanti Sitralu was actually scheduled to release on 24 September 2021 in theatres but, film skipped its theatrical release and released directly into ZEE5 on the same date.

== Reception ==
Alanti Sitralu received mixed reviews from critics and audiences. While the film was praised for its ambitious narrative and the performances of its lead actors, it was criticized for its lackluster writing and inconsistent screenplay. The film earned a rating of 2.5 out of 5, with critics noting that a stronger script could have elevated its premise into a more compelling drama.
