= Prassthanam =

2019 Indian film by Deva Katta

- Theatrical release poster
- Directed by: Deva Katta
- Screenplay by: Deva Katta; Farhad Samji (dialogues)
- Story by: Deva Katta
- Based on: Prasthanam by Deva Katta
- Produced by: Sanjay Dutt; Manyata Dutt; Sandeep Bhargava
- Starring: Sanjay Dutt; Ali Fazal; Jackie Shroff; Manisha Koirala; Amyra Dastur; Chunky Pandey; Satyajeet Dubey
- Narrated by: Sanjay Dutt
- Cinematography: Ravi Yadav
- Edited by: Ballu Saluja
- Music by: Songs: Ankit Tiwari; Farhad Samji; Vikram Montrose; Score: Mahesh Shankar
- Production company: Sanjay S Dutt Productions
- Distributed by: NH Studioz
- Release date: 20 September 2019
- Running time: 138 minutes
- Country: India
- Language: Hindi
- Budget: ₹20 crore
- Box office: ₹5.9 crore

Prassthanam (transl. Reign) is a 2019 Indian Hindi-language political action thriller film directed by Deva Katta and produced by Manyata Dutt under her own banner Sanjay S Dutt Productions. A remake of the 2010 Telugu-language film of the same name, the film stars Sanjay Dutt, Ali Fazal, Jackie Shroff, Manisha Koirala, Amyra Dastur, Chunky Pandey, and Satyajeet Dubey. The film follows a rural politician who favors his intelligent stepson as the heir to his throne, much to the disappointment of his own son who's hot-blooded and starts to rebel against his decision.

On 29 July 2019, Sanjay Dutt, the producer Manyata Dutt, and the director Deva Katta were sent a legal notice by Shemaroo Entertainment alleging they did not have the remake rights for the film and giving them three days to respond.

The film was released on 20 September 2019 and bombed at the box-office.

== Plot ==
Set in the backdrop of politics of Uttar Pradesh, Baldev Pratap Singh is a four time MLA from Malihabad constituency. Baldev recently obtained a stay order against businessman Bajwa Khatri, with which his popularity has soared and he is all set to win elections the fifth time. Majid Maqbool a leader in Baldev's political party is also in the fray and wishes to obtain party ticket for fighting elections from Malihabad constituency.

In a flashback of events, Baldev and Badshah are beating up the goons who challenge and insult Jaiprakash Kedar in local village elections. Jaiprakash's son Shiv decides to fight in the village elections after his father quits the race due to communal politics. Shiv's political opponent Kishen Yadav kills him during a rally, so Baldev and Badshah track down Kishen and his goons and kill them. On Jaiprakash’s deathbed, he asks Baldev to marry his daughter-in-law Saroj and take care of Shiv's children Ayush and Palak.

In the present day, Ayush works with Baldev and is the heir apparent to Baldev's political legacy. While Ayush is working with his step father, Palak has severed all ties with her mother and step father, which deeply saddens Saroj. She resents her mother for remarrying so soon after her father’s death, and then having another child. She is a doctor, married to a psychiatrist and has two small children. She only maintains a relationship with her brother Ayush. Palak introduces Ayush to her friend Shivi, whom he begins to date.

Baldev and Saroj's son Vivaan is a hot headed brat who aspires to take over his father's political empire, but Baldev believes he is unfit for politics and should rather go abroad and study so that he can come back to run the family business. Vivaan overheard his mother say she regrets having him, since it pushed her daughter away from her.

Badshah Khan is Baldev's loyal lieutenant. Badshah’s only child is Asma and has recently completed her MBA. Baldev appoints her manager of his hotel. Vivaan misbehaves with her when he is at the hotel, which Ayush witnesses. Baldev forces Vivaan to apologize to her in front of the family. As punishment, Vivaan must work under Asma at the hotel. Vivaan and Asma make up and become friends.

Majid blackmails the party officials and obtains the party ticket for Malihabad constituency so Baldev decides to fight the election as an independent. As elections are nearing, Baldev's enemies Majid and Bajwa have joined hands and make an unsuccessful assassination attempt on Baldev's life. Vivaan berates Baldev's party workers, including the leader of the farmers Durga, for their inability to stop the attack, Ayush publicly humiliates him for doing so.

An angry Vivaan is seen drinking on the ledge of the hotel window where Asma is the manager. Asma sees this and thinks Vivaan is committing suicide and comes to save Vivaan, after which Vivaan in an intoxicated state attempts to rape her. While she is trying to resist, Vivaan forces drugs down Asma’s throat and rapes her. Asma overdoses on the drugs. Vivaan and his friends in a state of panic meet with an accident on the way to get medical help. They all decide to burn the car and Asma's body in it so that nobody can find out that she was drugged and raped. Asma somehow manages to escape from the burning car but dies immediately after that and her body is found next day.

Vivaan is charged with Asma's murder and rape, which dents Baldev's chances of winning the elections. Vivaan begs his step-sister Palak, the medical examiner, to change the autopsy report, which she denies. In the wake of his waning popularity due to Vivaan's criminal actions, Baldev is forced to join hands with Bajwa to ensure that he wins the election the fifth time.

Meanwhile, Bajwa releases Vivaan from jail and conspires with him to take over his father's political legacy by eliminating Ayush. Baldev and Bajwa conspire to get Badshah eliminated. Vivaan sends people to assassinate Ayush while he is at the movies with Shivi and Palak’s children. Vivaan goes to Palak’s house and kills her and her husband while Ayush is on the phone. Baldev protect Vivaan from Ayush and tells Ayush to end the bloodshed. A furious Durga tells Ayush that Palak and her husband’s murder has been covered up as a robbery gone bad.

Ayush parts ways with Baldev and attempts to kill Vivaan while he is partying. but is unable to do so. Badshah then kills Vivaan. A furious Baldev tells SP Sarang to kill Ayush and Badshah. Bajwa adds Durga to the list so that Baldev has no opposition in the next election. Badshah thwarts the assassination and confesses to Ayush that Baldev had killed Shiv on the way to hospital to achieve his political ambitions.

Ayush, Badshah and Baldev meet at Baldev's house and Baldev asks Ayush to kill him. Ayush decides not to kill him and leaves along with Badshah. But unable to bear the mercy given by his step-son Ayush, Baldev shoots himself with his gun and kills himself. thus ending Baldev's era and marks the beginning of Ayush's era.

== Cast ==
- Sanjay Dutt as Baldev Pratap Singh
- Manisha Koirala as Saroj Kedar / Saroj Singh
- Ali Fazal as Ayushmann "Ayush" Shiv Kedar / Singh
- Amyra Dastur as Shivi, Ayush’s girlfriend
- Jackie Shroff as Badshah Khan, Baldev’s loyal lieutenant; Aasma's father
- Chunky Pandey as Don Bajwa Khatri
- Satyajeet Dubey as Vivaan Baldev Singh
- Chahatt Khanna as Dr. Palak, Shiv & Saroj’s eldest child; Ayush's sister; Vivan's step-sister and murder victim; Baldev's step-daughter
- M. K. Raina as Jaiprakash Kedar
- Anup Soni as Shiv Kedar
- Divina Thakur as Asma Khan, manager of a hotel owned by Baldev; Badshah's only daughter; Vivan's rape and murder victim
- Deepraj Rana as SP Sarang
- Zakir Hussain as Majid Maqbool
- Ishita Raj Sharma (special appearance in song "Dil Bevda")

== Production ==
=== Development ===
Dutt got interested to remake the Telugu film soon after it was released. After Dutt was released from jail approached the director of the original film Deva Katta, who said he got interested in the project due to Dutt's "intensity of interest from his side". The director stated that the team has not made significant changes from the original film. The film will mark the director's first Bollywood film as a director.

=== Casting ===
When the director narrated the script Manisha Koirala accepted the film. The director of the film further added, "The kind of respect and camaraderie that they (Dutt and Manisha) share has added to the film and on screen it is magical to see it". When Jackie Shroff joined the project, the director said it's a dream come true for him. Sooraj Pancholi was chosen to play in the lead role was later replaced by Ali Fazal, due to his busy schedule for his next film.

=== Filming ===
On 1 June 2018, on the occasion of Sanjay Dutt's late mother Nargis' 89th birth anniversary, Dutt announced the film to be produced. Filming began on 6 June the occasion Dutt's late father Sunil Dutt's 90th birth anniversary. Sanjay Dutt began shooting portions of the film in Lucknow.

== Soundtrack ==
Prassthanam

Soundtrack album by Ankit Tiwari, Farhad Samji and Vikram Montrose
- Released: 9 September 2019
- Recorded: 2018–2019
- Genre: Feature film soundtrack
- Length: 20:53
- Language: Hindi
- Producer: Zee Music Company
External audio
- Audio Jukebox on YouTube

The music of the film is composed by Ankit Tiwari, Farhad Samji and Vikram Montrose while lyrics are written by Farhad Samji, Atique Allahabadi, Shekhar Astitwa, Yash Eshawari and Anurag Bhomia.

Track listing
No.	Title	Lyrics	Music	Singer(s)	Length
1.	"Prassthanam – Title Track"	Farhad Samji	Farhad Samji	Dev Negi	3:37
2.	"Dil Dariyan"	Anurag Bhomia	Ankit Tiwari	Ankit Tiwari, Deepali Sathe	5:27
3.	"Charo Khane Chit"	Yash Eshawari	Vikram Montrose	Sukhwinder Singh	3:41
4.	"Haji Ali"	Atique Allahabadi	Vikram Montrose	Sukhwinder Singh	4:27
5.	"Dil Bevda"	Shekhar Astitwa	Vikram Montrose	Mika Singh, Bhoomi Trivedi	3:51
Total length:					20:53

== Release ==
The film was released on 20 September 2019.

== Reception ==
=== Critical reception ===
On the review aggregator website Rotten Tomatoes, 29% of 7 critics' reviews are positive, with an average rating of 5/10.

The Times of India gave 3 out of 5 stars stating "Prassthanam is a tried and tested political potboiler with power, greed and emotions at its core".

The Indian Express gave 2.5 out of 5 stars stating "Of the ensemble, in which Chunky Panday gets to wear a bad wig and vamp it up most enjoyably, Ali Fazal is the most impressive".

=== Box office ===
Prassthanam collected ₹80 lakhs on the opening day and second day also ₹ 1.00 crore, whereas the third day collection was ₹1.25 crore, taking its total opening weekend collection to ₹30.5 million in India.

As of 10 October 2019, with gross of ₹5.65 crore from India and ₹21 lakhs from overseas, the film has grossed ₹58.6 million worldwide.
