= Dying to Be Me =

Dying To Be Me
- Directed by: Deva Katta
- Written by: Deva Katta
- Produced by: I-Candy
- Starring: Smita; Ravi Varma
- Cinematography: Satish Mutyala
- Edited by: S. R. Sekkhar
- Music by: K. K.
- Release date: 14 August 2015
- Running time: 2 minutes 6 seconds
- Language: English

Dying To Be Me is a 2015 Indian English-language short film written and directed by Deva Katta, starring Smita and Ravi Varma. The film highlights woman empowerment.

== Plot ==
At dinner, former housewife Shipa tells her husband Varun that she got a job at Red Star Tech as a software developer, but Varun dissuades her from accepting it as it is a "male" job. Varun's image of a "female" job is taking care of his parents and their future kids. Shilpa then goes into deep thought and remembers her life doing all of the chores of the house including washing the dishes, making food, and doing laundry. She also reminisces on her free time watching serials and reading the book Dying To Be Me by Anita Moorjani. Shipa tells Varun that she is taking up the job as she has the liberty to do so.

== Cast ==
- Smita as Shilpa
- Ravi Varma as Varun
