= Vennela =

- Movie poster
- Directed by: Deva Katta
- Written by: Deva Katta
- Produced by: Ravi Vallabhaneni; Sachi Pinagapani; Chalapathi Mannuru
- Starring: Raja; Parvati Melton; Sharvanand; Ravi Varma
- Cinematography: Raja Rathnam
- Edited by: Kola Bhaskar
- Music by: Mahesh Shankar
- Production company: Fourth Dimension Films
- Release date: 26 November 2005
- Running time: 133 minutes
- Countries: India; United States
- Language: Telugu

Vennela (English: Moonlight) is a 2005 Telugu romantic comedy film written and directed by Deva Katta in his directorial debut. The film stars Raja and Parvati Melton, while Sharwanand and Ravi Varma play supporting roles. The music was composed by Mahesh Shankar with cinematography by Raja Rathnam and editing by Kola Bhaskar.

The film released on 26 November 2005 and was a box office success. The film has a sequel Vennela 1½ (2012) made by Kishore, who reprised his character.

== Plot ==
Pavani (Parvati Melton) is an independent woman who wants to pursue higher education in the United States. She has been in a committed relationship with Ritesh (Sharvanand), the son of a millionaire and her classmate. Ritesh was an intelligent and popular student at Government City College, Hyderabad. He draws hostility, jealousy, and enmity with his college mate Sayeed (Ravi Varma), who was also interested in Pavani, albeit secretly. Sayeed introduces Ritesh to smoking, drinking and college politics. Ritesh loses himself in those activities, which disappoints Pavani. She tries to make him responsible but fails. She decides to break up with him several times, but he convinces her to change her mind. At last, she decides to finally break up with him, and she moves to the US to keep away from him.

While celebrating her upcoming departure to the USA with her friends, Pavani meets Naveen (Raja) and his friends, who happen to get admitted to the same Wayne State University in Detroit. Naveen and his friends go through culture shock and the troubles faced in studying in the US and trying for a part-time job, including an Indian restaurant owner, Pachadlla Paramanandam (Brahmanandam). Sayeed, also a student of the same university, is aware of Pavani’s strained relationship with Ritesh.

Sayeed tries to mess up with Pavani and Ritesh's life to satisfy his ego and provokes Ritesh by lying about Pavani's relationship with Naveen. As Naveen and Pavani become closer, Sayeed brings Ritesh to the USA on a student visa to sabotage their relationship. On the other hand, Ritesh's father tries to woo Pavani with the property that will be inherited by Ritesh upon her marriage to him, but Pavani rejects his father's offer. Ritesh becomes hostile towards Pavani: he believes he was used and cheated on and that he is innocent.

Ritesh's father advises him not to get involved with a woman like Pavani, who does not want anything to do with Ritesh. His father reminds him that he is lucky to be born in a wealthy family, get a good education, and can settle down with his father's inherited property. However, Ritesh ignores his father's advice.

The rest of the plot depicts situations that deal with Ritesh's agony at being rejected by Pavani and also on realizing that he is a victim of Sayeed's scheme when he chances upon morphed images of Pavani. Subsequently, Ritesh becomes psychotic. He kills Sayeed at the university campus and attacks Pavani and Naveen by hiding in their car while they return from work. Just as Ritesh shoots Naveen in the neck, the cops arrive with an ambulance and rescue Naveen and Pavani.

The film highlights situations that leads people like Ritesh to dig their own graves by getting into bad company.

== Cast ==
- Raja as Naveen
- Parvati Melton as Pavani
- Brahmanandam as Pachadla Paramanandam / Paper Check
- Sharwanand as Ritesh
- Ravi Varma as Sayeed
- Kishore as Khader Bhasha
- Madhu Reddiboina as Sunil
- Mohit Shah as Pavan
- Achyuta Rama Rao as Rambabu
- Shalini Sharma as Deepti
- Vuka as Chantal
- Telangana Shakuntala as Rambabu's mother
- Chris Peters as the rest area guard
- Sana as Pavani's mother (uncredited)
- Paul Iafelice as Indian restaurant customer (uncredited)

== Production ==
=== Development ===
Vennela was directed by then Michigan-based Deva Katta, and produced by 25 NRIs. The film deals with the lives of Indian students who study in the United States for college and was based on Katta's college days. He combined the idea of his previous unreleased documentary film Valasa (2000) with a love story to create Vennela. Raja, Ravi Varma and Sharwanand's characters are based on three different personalities of students with Sharwanand's character arc being inspired by a true story. Katta named the film Vennela since it denotes pleasantness and romance.

=== Casting ===
Raja and California-based model Parvati Melton accepted the film after liking their respective characterisations. Ravi Varma auditioned for a lead role in Valasa, and Katta offered him a role in Vennela as Sayeed. To prepare for his role, he visited engineering colleges in Hyderabad, and observed the mannerisms of Muslim male students. After working as an assistant director to Katta for a few days, Katta suggested Kishore take up a role in the film. Katta, Ravi Varma and Kishore left their jobs to work on this film. Brahmanandam played the Indian restaurant owner. Production manager Achyuta Rama Rao played the Indian restaurant chef.

=== Filming ===
The muhurat took place at Canton Hindu Temple near Detroit on 29 June 2005. The film was predominately shot in Michigan including Wayne State University, where Katta went to college. According to Raja, shooting abroad had many problems due to the weather and high cost of production. Part of the film was shot in Hyderabad in August 2005. Brahmanandam shot for the film for ten days in America. Raju Sundaram choreographed five of the film's songs.

== Soundtrack ==
Vennela

Soundtrack album by Mahesh Shankar
- Released: 2005
- Genre: Feature film soundtrack
- Length: 31:47
- Language: Telugu
- Label: T-Series

Mahesh Shankar chronology
Flavors (2003)	Vennela (2005)	Prayanam (2009)
External audio
- Vennela – Jukebox on YouTube

The music was composed by Mahesh Shankar. The audio rights were bagged by Madhura Entertainment. The audio launch was held on 29 October 2005 with Rajendra Prasad, Tammareddy Bharadwaja, Prabhu Deva, Raghavendra Lawrence, Chandra Siddhartha, Dharani, Siva Balaji, and Saloni Aswani invited as guests. The audio CD release function took place in Hyderabad Central.

Track listing
No.	Title	Lyrics	Singer(s)	Length
1.	"Preyasikaavu"	Deva Katta	Rishi	4:13
2.	"Bhagyam Podduna"	Deva Katta	Sudeep, Saindhavi, Funky M.	4:33
3.	"Super Model"	Deva Katta	Karthik, Saindhavi, Devan Ekambaram	4:49
4.	"Ningi Nela"	Ravivarma	Gopalrao	2:15
5.	"Nela Thakani"	Deva Katta	Sudeep, Saindhavi	3:43
6.	"Chesthara Love"	Deva Katta	Sudeep, Saindhavi, Rajani, Devan Ekambaram, Anitha	4:34
7.	"Busy Life"	Deva Katta	Aravind, Devan Ekambaram, Sudeep, Funky M.	3:42
8.	"East West"	Deva Katta	Tippu	3:58
Total length:				31:47

== Release ==
It celebrated 50 days and 100 days in 7 and 3 centres, respectively. After 50 days, the film's collections dropped because of the big releases on Sankranti. The film underperformed due to lack of promotions, but was a success as the film was appreciated by the youth.
