= Pachchis =

- Directed by: Sri Krishna; Rama Sai
- Written by: Sri Krishna
- Produced by: Kaushik Kumar Kathuri; Rama Sai
- Starring: Raamz; Swetha Varma
- Cinematography: Kartik Parmar
- Edited by: Rana Pratap
- Music by: Smaran Sai
- Production companies: Avasa Chitram; Raasta Films; Mango Mass Media
- Distributed by: Amazon Prime Video
- Release date: 12 June 2021
- Running time: 127 minutes
- Country: India
- Language: Telugu

Pachchis (transl. Twenty-five) is a 2021 Indian Telugu-language thriller film directed by debutants Sri Krishna and Rama Sai. Produced jointly by Avasa Chitram, Raasta Films, and Mango Mass Media, the film features Raamz and Swetaa Varma in lead roles. The music of the film is composed by Smaran. It was premiered on Amazon Prime Video on 12 June 2021.

== Plot ==
The film opens with the interrogation of a mole/spy, Rakesh, in a gang that belongs to Gangadhar, a politician. The mole/spy reveals that he was investigating Mallikarjun, a member of the gang, before he is killed. Abhiram, a gambling addict, is in debt of a loan shark, R. K. Abhiram makes false promises to get R. K. a contract through his contact with another politician, Basava Raju. Meanwhile, Avantika, the sister of the Rakesh, takes matters into her own hands and starts searching for her brother. It is revealed that Rakesh was not a police officer, but was working for Basava Raju. After R. K. finds out the truth about Abhiram's schemes, he threatens him to repay the debt within three days. Having nowhere to escape, Abhiram triggers a game of cat and mouse to search for the mole/spy belonging to the police.

== Cast ==
- Raamz as Abhiram
- Swetaa Varma as Avantika
- Jay Chandra
- John Kottoly
- Ravi Varma
- Dayanand Reddy
- Keshav Deepak
- Subhalekha Sudhakar
- Vishwendar Reddy

== Production ==
Raamz, who previously worked as a costume designer, made his debut as an actor in the film.

== Soundtrack ==
All music is composed by Smaran.

Telugu (OST)
No.	Title	Lyrics	Singer(s)	Length
1.	"Joodham" (Additional vocals: Saurabh Chaganty)	Niklesh Sunkoji	Smaran	3:51

== Reception ==
Neeshita Nyayapati of The Times of India gave a rating of 2 out of 5 and stated, "Sounds great on paper, but the film fails to take off." LetsOTT's Siddarth Srinivas, rated the film 2/5 and called it a "sub-standard crime drama." He added that the film stuck to the basics when it should have really tried to do something different.

Rentala Jayadeva of Sakshi criticized the slow placed narration and stated: "The story never took off properly and it could not end satisfactorily. [sic]"
