= Autonagar Surya =

2014 film directed by Deva Katta

- Movie Poster
- Directed by: Deva Katta
- Written by: Deva Katta
- Produced by: K. Achi Reddy
- Starring: Naga Chaitanya; Samantha Ruth Prabhu
- Cinematography: Srikanth Naroj
- Edited by: Gautham Raju
- Music by: Anoop Rubens
- Production company: Max India Productions
- Distributed by: CineGalaxy Inc., (Overseas); Sri Venkateswara Creations, Hari Pictures
- Release date: 27 June 2014
- Running time: 157 minutes (Initial Version); 145 minutes (Final Version)
- Country: India
- Language: Telugu
- Budget: ₹25 crores

Autonagar Surya is a 2014 Indian Telugu-language Periodic political action drama film directed by Deva Katta. The film stars Naga Chaitanya and Samantha Ruth Prabhu, with Brahmanandam and Sai Kumar in pivotal roles. The film was produced by K. Atchi Reddy, under Max India Productions, while R. R. Movie Makers initially presented the film, but later disassociated themselves with the film owing to the delays. It is the second film in Deva Katta's quadrilogy of society, which show's the perspective of a common man on society.

Anoop Rubens composed the music for the film while Srikanth Naroj, known for his work in the 2011 film Hostel handled the cinematography. Gautham Raju handled the editing.

The principal photography started officially on 14 October 2011 at Hyderabad. After Filming continuously till December 2012, the film's shoot was halted due to the Financial turmoil of the producers ultimately reviving in September 2013, Wrapping the entire shooting by 30 November 2013. The film was scheduled for a worldwide release on 27 June 2014 in theaters.

Upon release, the film opened to mixed-to-negative reviews from the critics and audience, due to which the film was trimmed by 12 minutes. However, over time, it received much appreciation on satellite.

== Plot ==
The story begins in 1973. A couple had been murdered by Kotalingam in a train at night time for stopping to rape a girl acquaintance to everyone who fears to stop. However, he bribes the Railway Police to leave and molests the girl and kills her too. The child Surya who becomes gullible for not finding his parents and fears to see Kotalingam in the train. Then after 3 years in Autonagar, Vijayawada where Surya has been mistreated by his maternal uncle Bharani who has a grudge against his parents for doing Inter-caste marriage and orders him to leave. Then his neighbor Sitaramaraju, a mechanical engineer, runs a work shop, gives shelter to him, and treats him like his son.

After 8 years in 1984 the young Surya who gained great ability on Engines who successfully made India's first Diesel engine and presents in Autonagar along with his friends Kicha, Bunty and others in front of Bharani and his daughter Sirisha "Siri" who has a crush on her. Then, after observing their expertise, Jeeva, a gangster offers a job to Sitaramaraju, who eventually rejects, which leads to a fight that provokes Surya to kill Jeeva under self defense. But Surya has been arrested for murder and served sentences for 5 years where he completed his graduation in Mechanical engineering under the guidance of the Jailer. Meanwhile, Indra, a gangster turned Corporator to Autonagar who destroyed Sitaramaraju's workshop and replaces Surya's friends as his workers in his business in the place of Jeeva by force.

Then the story shifts to 1989. Surya releases from jail and reconciles his old friends and finds Autonagar now completely shifts to diesel engines who once they introduced. Then, after reconciling with Sirisha, Surya aims to work on Electric vehicle battery and starts a manufacturing company of his own. But the circumstances seems is not a bed of roses in Autonagar for Surya. There Indra rules the Autonagar with his iron fist, he is also a loyal subordinate to the Mayor of Vijayawada is none other than Kotalingam who orchestrated the whole mafia which links to Autonagar

After denial of membership in the Autonagar association by Bharani, he is now a president of the association. Then Surya approaches Indra to get a membership in the association with the help of Kicha, then Indra offers a deal to them in exchange of his membership they accepts later in the midway Surya finds out the deal is about smuggled spare parts and questions it after completion of the deal he denies their commission and leaves. Later, the gang decides to work together for Surya's project. Then suddenly Surya finds out Sitaramaraju after the destruction of his workshop, who becomes depressed and addicted to alcohol, then Surya joins along with him in the project soon, the gang successfully makes a prototype of the battery vehicle with the investment of Bhagwan, a private financier involved because holds a secret grudge against Indra. Later, Surya presents the prototype in front of Sirisha and proposes her, and she accepts.

Then the issue begins; Surya locks horns with Giri a trusted aid to Indra regarding his prototype. Later, he orchestrated a complaint against Surya and his friends for making Monopoly in the Autonagar who are not members of the association. However, Surya gets approval from the association and becomes a member of his intellect. Soon, Surya progresses his work by buying the governments vehicle for scrape in a public auction against Indra, who regularly stays only bidder in the auction. Surya also questions the system in the association which makes Indra angry and warns Bharani to control his nephew, which reveals Bharani is a puppet of Indra because he has all the control over Bharani's investments later he orchestrates Association members alleges Bharani involves in the union scam.

Meanwhile, Surya slowly gains support from the weaker members in the association and forms an aligned with them to try to expose the union scam doing by the Indra backed by the mayor. Then Giri attempts to kill them, but Surya and his friends alert and counter them back. Then Indra involves a corrupt commissioner and orchestrates a fake ride on the whole of Autonagar and seizes all workshops. Then commissioner warns them not to mess with Indra and joins with them or else Surya having a past criminal record his future will be ruined by them.

Then Surya counters back by kidnapping Indra's son Bharath and demands further claims no option left Indra obeys all of the demands as Surya said, including the issues related to union scam and reveals there is no involvement of his uncle in the Union scam. Later, Surya exposes the commissioner in a brothel and destroys Indra's lorry agency. Later, he gives the investment amount to his uncle, though he mistreats again and shows hatred towards him. Later, a final blow to Indra, Surya, makes him obey to cast his vote in the city council for the favor of the Autonagar association's autonomy and declares rebellion against the Mafia

Then the Mayor involves stopping the rebellion against his regime he abducts Bharani and orders Surya to get Bharath alive in his Uncle's exchange. Then, a pandemonium established in the Autonagar, which results in the death of Bunty and Sitaramaraju, then enraged Surya kills Indra and Giri and whole Autonagar strikes back on the mobs of Mayor. Which eventually exposed by the mafia and the union scam in the Autonagar association and becomes a sensation of the whole state.

Later, guilt ridden Bharani apologized Surya for his actions towards him, accepted him as his nephew, and declared him as his son-in-law. Later in a private unofficial meet, the Mayor offers Indra's position to Surya, but he rejects it and reminds him about their past encounter in the train Mayor admits it by saying he is here not for compromise but to observe and identify him as the result of his past deed. Then he challenges Mayor to overthrown his regime soon by claiming it is not a personal war or vengeance it is a war between the oppressed and oppressors, soon making him out of power.

Then the story shifts to 1991 where Surya is organizing a political rally in the Autonagar then the Mayor's gang attacks the rally and abducts Kicha, then Surya follows the gang into a ware house then to his shock Kicha backstabs him for Indra's position. Then Mayor tries to kill both of them but in the scuffle, Surya kills Mayor and spares Kicha by saying, "You believed him and lost your friend" and says to injured mayor that he has seen his victory not on his death but he has seen his death on his victory". After hearing this the mayor dies.

Finally, the film ends with Surya establishing a proper democratic system in Autonagar.

== Cast ==
- Naga Chaitanya as Surya
- Madhusudhan Rao as Mayor Kotalingam
- Nandu as Kicha
- Sai Kumar as Bharani, Autonagar Union President, a puppet to Indra, maternal uncle to Surya, and father of Sirisha
- Jaya Prakash Reddy as Corporator Indra
- Sammetta Gandhi as Sitaramaraju, Surya's father figure.
- Samantha Ruth Prabhu as Sirisha "Siri", Surya's love interest
- Brahmanandam as Kamalakatla Brahmanandam "Super Mechanic Brahmi", who researches on LPG vehicles, rival of Surya.
- Tanikella Bharani as Jailor
- Brahmaji as Indra's brother-in-law
- Sai Pradeep as Bunty
- M. S. Narayana as Loan Officer
- Venu Madhav as Srinu an assistant to Brahmi.
- Ajay as Giri
- Raghu Babu as Commissioner
- Ahuti Prasad as Collector
- Jeeva as Jeeva
- Ajay Ghosh as Giri's henchman
- Prudhvi Raj as financier Bhagwan
- Master Bharath as Bharath, son of Indra
- Ravi Prakash as Surya's father
- Surekha Vani as Surya's mother
- Kimaya as an item number "Hyderabad Biriyani"

== Production ==
=== Development ===
During the post-production activities of his directorial Prasthanam, a 26-year-old IT employee was migrating from Chennai to Calcutta along with his wife, 18-month-old baby and some extra luggage. In Orissa around midnight, a couple of drunk railway police boarded the compartment. They asked him whether he paid for all of the extra luggage. They demanded him to pay for the extra luggage and threatened to throw the luggage out of train if not paid. The IT employee refused to pay as he already bribed a ticket collector in Chennai. When they asked him to show the receipt, he questioned them "since when they have been issuing receipts for bribes?" and asked if they are going to issue one if he pays now. A quarrel took place which ended with the Railway police throwing the IT employee's wife and the 18-month-old baby out of the running train, both died on spot. This disturbed him very much, which he told in an interview later.

Deva Katta later reacted to the incident. He said, "The problem does not lay 'in' the system but way 'under' the system, deep inside each one of us, our very understanding about life and its interconnections. All actions and reactions finally boil down to the elemental level of thinking with which we live and view others life." He also said that "More than the incident it was the responsiveness of the total system that alarmed me the most" as there was no news later about the IT employee and about the actions taken on those drunk police officers. That article made Deva Katta to design the conditions and basic frame of the film's plot and the protagonist's character and claimed no reference to the people involved in the incident anywhere in the film. He added that the disturbance is a "subconscious stream" in the film and said that the film is all about "an underdog's rise from a nobody to somebody while fighting for his share of life, ambition and happiness".

Though the origin of this project was revealed by Deva Katta in the late 2010, Naga Chaitanya signed an Untitled film which was reported to be directed by Deva Katta under Max India Productions which would make this film Deva Katta's Third Directorial Venture in 2011. Deva Katta confirmed that the project is Autonagar Surya itself and not any other film. Due to the construction of an automobile industry set designed by Art Director Ravindra, the filming delayed and was set to start after Naga Chaitanya completed his shooting for Dhada. After Dhada became a Box Office failure, news of shelving the film temporarily were reported. However, the film had an official launch on Vijaya Dasami of 2011. A Tata 207 pickup truck was stripped down for a unique and massive look which was used by the Hero in the film predominantly. The truck's photo was released later which gained attention from the public.

=== Casting ===
In December 2010, reports emerged that Nandamuri Balakrishna was recruited to play the role of Surya. However, Deva Katta dismissed those reports. Later it was reported that Deva Katta approached Pawan Kalyan for playing the title role. Finally after much speculation, Naga Chaitanya was signed to play the role of Surya in February 2011 and Samantha was apparently selected as the heroine with only the former was confirmed then. The role of Surya played by Chaitanya in the film was said to be a skilled mechanic based in Vijayawada but the director claimed it to have no connection with Vijayawada. Initially, Nithya Menen, Kajal Agarwal and Rakul Preet Singh were considered for the role of Heroine but later Samantha was recruited. She was reported to be playing a mass role with some shades of comedy. Rakul Preet Singh was recruited to play another heroine marking her first collaboration with Naga Chaitanya, which was later denied.

Veteran actor and voice artist Sai Kumar was recruited to play the role of Heroine's father. Brahmanandam was recruited to play a hilarious role and later some morphed photos of Brahmanandam used in the film were officially released into the Internet which received positive response allover. It was said that his role was named "Super Mechanic" Brahmi who is a rival to Surya's business and Venu Madhav would be his assistant. Apart from this, Madhu of "Chakravakam" fame was recruited to play the role of City Mayor and Jaya Prakash Reddy was recruited to play the role of corporator of the city. Popular actors Ravi Prakash and Surekha Vani were recruited to play the roles of Surya's parents who die in an unexpected train accident when Surya was of 4 years. Mumbai dance based reality show contestant Kimaya was recruited for an item song in the movie after the film's team saw her in a special song in a Kannada film named Dakota Picture.

=== Filming ===
The filming officially started from 14 October 2011 in Hyderabad. After wrapping key portions, the film unit resumed its shooting in Hyderabad from 27 February 2012. Two songs were canned on Chaitanya and Samantha at Ramoji Film City and Annapoorna Studios under the choreography of Raju Sundaram. The Climax was shot at Ramoji Film City in Hyderabad in which Chaitanya and others participated. In December 2012, the opening sequence of the film was shot at a railway station set in Ramoji Film City by using an old steam engine train which was said to be used in the film in Night Effect. However the film's shoot was halted due to financial turmoil and the news of its revival came in August 2013 by Deva Katta himself. He further added that they are planning to start the shoot from 10 September 2013, finish a song and the patchwork in India and shift to Malaysia for the last song which would complete the photography work.

The film then had a silent shoot and by November, Deva Katta revealed that 90% of the film's shoot was complete and Sai Kumar dubbed for his role underway and the remaining portions were informed to be wrapped up soon. On 11 November 2013 it was reported that the last song was being shot on Naga Chaitanya and Samantha in Hyderabad for 3 days with which entire shooting of the film would be completed. The song was wrapped up on 14 November 2013 with yet another song's shoot to be done. Later it was announced that the last song's shoot would take place from 27 November 2013 whose completion would end the principal photography. It was a flirtatious song titled Hyderabad Biriyani shot on the street where Surya resides in the film. It was shot on Naga Chaitanya and Kimaya under Raju Sundaram choreography at Rock Castle in Hyderabad and the shooting completed on 30 November 2013.

== Soundtrack ==
Anup Rubens composed the music and background score for this film which marks his first collaboration with both Naga Chaitanya and Deva Katta. The soundtrack featured seven songs with lyrics written by Anantha Sriram. The film's music launch was delayed multiple times due to production delays, before being held on 31 January 2014 at Shilpakala Vedika in Hyderabad. The album was released under the Aditya Music label.

== Release ==
Autonagar Surya is one of the most delayed films in the history of Telugu cinema. During the film's launch in mid October 2011, it was said that the film would release in summer 2012. After few failed estimates, Finally in early October 2012, it was confirmed that the film would release in the month of November 2012 as a Diwali release. Later, Deva Katta posted in his Twitter that the film would release on 2 December 2012. In mid January 2013, Deva Katta announced that the film would release as a summer special. In the end of January 2013, Deva Katta posted controversial tweets of producers because of the film's delay and after posting a series of controversial tweets, he tweeted that the film would release in Summer 2013. In the end of August 2013, Deva Katta announced that the film would release in the month of September 2013. But, the producers said that shooting would continue in September 2013 and the film would release on the occasion of Diwali by conducting a press meet. In early November 2013, it was reported that the film would release in December 2013.

In early December 2013, it was reported that the film would release in the end of January 2014 because of lack of theaters during the Sankranthi season i.e. mid January 2014 because of release of Mahesh Babu's 1: Nenokkadine and Ram Charan's Yevadu. In the end of December 2013, the makers declared the release date as 31 January 2014 by conducting a press meet. It was also said that the film would release before Krishna Vamsi's Paisa, both being produced by R. R. Movie Makers. In early February 2014, it was reported that the film would release on either 14 February 2014 or 21 February 2014. In mid February 2014, the release date was declared as 27 February 2014 on the occasion of Maha Sivarathri by conducting a press meet. In the end of March 2014, it was reported that the film may release after the release of Naga Chaitanya's Manam as the film's producers became bankrupt.

At the same time, it was said that the film's release has been postponed because of a case filed by the financiers on the producers for non payment of certain sum of money payable. It was also said that the film may release after the elections i.e. after May 2014. In mid May 2014, it was reported that Deva Katta is working on his next script and has lost hopes on this project. On 14 June 2014 the film's producer K. Atchi Reddy said that the film's post production work is undergoing and is scheduled for a release on 27 June 2014. On 17 June 2014, CineGalaxy, Inc. issued a press release which stated that they acquired the overseas theatrical screening rights of the film and are distributing there in association with Dil Raju and Hari Pictures. They also confirmed the release date as 27 June 2014 with grand premiere shows on 26 June 2014. On 19 June 2014 Dil Raju, Deva Katta and K. Atchi Reddy attended the press meet confirming the release date as 27 June.

Dil Raju who secured the Nizam area rights thanked Alankar Prasad and Usha Pictures Balakrishna Rao for helping the film's release. In a statement to the IANS, Dil Raju said "All films go through hurdles and Autonagar Surya was no exception. I'm not worried about the film's delayed release because I'm confident about its success. The hero of a film nowadays is the content and this film has very good content. Many have been saying that I'm releasing ‘Autonagar Surya’ now because I want to capitalize on the success of ‘Manam’. However, both the films are different and they belong to different genres. And as I said before, it's the content that matters the most." On 20 June 2014 the film's copy was sent to Central Board of Film Certification for censor.

But on 21 June 2014 Shaik Abdul Mohammad, a businessman from Guntur, filed a case on the producers of the film in Guntur court, claiming that the producers have taken an amount of ₹2 crores from him and failed to pay it. He also said that in addition to not paying the amount, the producers have also not given him the distribution rights of the film in Guntur, Prakasam and Nellore districts after collecting the amounts from him. The IV Additional Chief District Judge issued notices to the producers to not release the film till 10 July 2014. On 23 June 2014 the film was awarded a U/A certificate by the Central Board of Film Certification. On the same day, Cinegalaxy, Inc. issued the first list of 65 screens in overseas where the film would be screened. It was re-censored on 24 June 2014 and was awarded an A certificate with no cuts and a duration of 157 minutes including rolling titles as the makers opted to retain the cuts suggested earlier.

On 25 June 2014 CineGalaxy Inc., issued a press note regarding the status of the film's US release. In that press note, they said that the hard drives had been shipped already from India in two sets, with one set reaching USA on 24 June and another set on 25 June. They added that the film would release in English subtitles and a complete list of theaters would be released soon. It was later revealed that K. Atchi Reddy filed a case in the High Court at Hyderabad challenging the stay granted by a lower court in Guntur on release of the film. He contended that he had nothing to do with the dealing as it was between R. R. Movie makers and the complainant and R. R. Movie Makers have no way connected with the film.

=== Marketing ===
The first look posters and stills depicting the lead pair were released on 23 November 2012 on the occasion of Naga Chaitanya's birthday. On the same day, a teaser of 43 seconds with a dialogue spelled by Chaitanya was released which gained viral response over the Internet, raising much expectations on the film. After releasing a set of stills after the film's revival, the first visual trailer of the film was reported to be launched on 23 November 2013 again on the occasion of Naga Chaitanya's birthday. It was also informed later that the trailer would be screened in Theaters along with Selvaraghavan's directorial Varna, the Telugu back to back shot version of Irandaam Ulagam, which was released on 22 November 2013 across the world. A set of 6 stills, 3 poster designs and the Theatrical trailer of 96 Seconds were released officially into the Web Media on 22 November 2013, a day before Naga Chaitanya's birthday as his birthday gifts by the team.

=== Distribution ===
The worldwide distribution rights were sold for ₹18 crore (US$1.9 million), to Dil Raju. The satellite rights were sold for ₹4.6 crore (US$480,000), to Gemini TV. However, the film recovered twice the amount of its actual production cost of ₹25 crore (US$2.6 million).

== Reception ==
=== Critical response ===
The film received mixed to positive response from critics and audiences. Jeevi of idlebrain.com gave a rating of 3/5 stating "Auto Nagar Surya has good premise and good intention. But should have been edited better. Plus points of the film are dialogues, ideology and performances. First half of the film is nice and with good elevation of protagonist character in pre-interval scenes. Second half of the film should have been better with better screenplay. This film too needs trimming in terms of comedy episodes and songs just like Deva Katta's earlier movie Prasthanam". The Hindu gave a review stating "Art director Ravindra's massive set representing a mini automobile factory, Srikanth Naroj's cinematography and background score by Anoop Rubens add to the intensity. Autonagar Surya makes for a reasonably good watch and yet, we can't help feeling that Deva Katta is capable of delivering a more hard-hitting film, going by his previous work, Prasthanam." Zee News gave a review stating "In the history of cinema, oft has the subject of political thriller been told and retold. But this Deva Katta directed film Autonagar Surya makes you sit and take notice of the narrative unfold itself in a peculiar yet interesting way. It does look like a film made with precision and mastery of craft."

Deccan Chronicle gave a review stating " The setting for the story looks very natural. The cinematography is good and of Chaitanya and Samantha's scenes have come out very well. On the whole, a predictable and long story, Autonagar Surya may not go down well with many. Deva Katta fails this time and falls short of the expectations." The New Indian Express gave a review stating "Overall, Autonagar Surya is meant for die-hard fans of Naga Chaitanya. The film entertains with its action sequences, dialogues and music. Watch it if you're a Naga Chaitanya fan."Onenindia Entertainment gave a review stating "Overall, Autonagar Surya has a simple and routine story, but it is the director's treatment of the subject that makes the film a good entertainer. Naga Chaitanya rocks the viewers with his heroism. The movie is good treat for all Akkineni family fans" and rated the film 3/5.

=== Box office ===
The movie has collected approximately Rs 6.85 crores nett at the global Box Office in the first weekend. Its breakup is Rs 2.2 cr on Fri, Rs 2 cr on Sat and Rs 2.65 cr on Sun.

== Awards and nominations ==
SIIMA Awards

- Nominated - Best Actor in a Negative Role - Chakravakam Madhu
