= Prasthanam =

2010 Indian film by Deva Katta

- Directed by: Deva Katta
- Written by: Deva Katta
- Produced by: Ravi Vallabhaneni
- Starring: Sharwanand; Sai Kumar; Sundeep Kishan; Ruby Parihar
- Cinematography: Shamdat Sainudeen
- Edited by: Dharmendra Kakarala
- Music by: Mahesh Shankar
- Release date: 16 April 2010
- Running time: 151 minutes
- Country: India
- Language: Telugu

Prasthanam (transl. Reign) is a 2010 Indian Telugu-language political action thriller film written and directed by Deva Katta. The film was produced by Ravi Vallabhaneni under VRC Media & Entertainment banner. The film stars Sharwanand, Sai Kumar, Sundeep Kishan (in his career acting debut) and Ruby Parihar. The film received generally positive response upon release with praise for Sai Kumar's performance. The film won two Filmfare Awards South, two Nandi Awards and was also featured at the 41st IFFI in the Indian Panorama section. The film was dubbed and released in Tamil as Padhavi and in Hindi as Asteen Ka Saanp.

Katta remade Prasthanam in Hindi with the same title in 2019. This film is the first film in the Deva Katta's Quadriology of society which shows the perspective of a Politician on society. The film is considered one of the "25 Greatest Telugu Films Of The Decade" by Film Companion.

== Plot ==
Ketti Lokanatham Naidu aka Loki takes control of a political party following the death of its patriarch, Dasharatha Rama Naidu, and marries his widowed daughter-in-law, Savitri. Savitri's son from her first marriage, Mitranand aka Mitra, admires Loki, but her daughter, Valli, disapproves of the union. The family eventually relocates to Vijayawada.

25 years later, Loki has risen through the ranks to become the prospective Chief Minister of Andhra Pradesh. Chinna, Loki's biological son, resents his father for favouring Mitra. Meanwhile, Valli has disowned her mother, though maintains a close relationship with Mitra, who is dating her sister-in-law, Latha. Chinna is further disappointed after Loki appoints Mitra as the new Youth President of the party over Chinna.

That night, an intoxicated Chinna assaults Nadia, the daughter of Loki's confidant, Hameed Basha. While Chinna and his friends attempt to drive Nadia to a hospital, their car crashes and explodes, killing Nadia while Chinna and his friends escape. The following day, Chinna visits Valli, who is working as Nadia's forensic pathologist, and pleads with her to give a falsified report. When Valli threatens to expose him, Chinna flees. Basha attempts to stop him, but Chinna stabs him. Shortly after, Chinna murders Valli and her husband at their home, devastating Mitra.

Desperate to protect his son, Loki refuses to let Chinna face justice and orders his henchmen to assault Mitra when he tries to pursue Chinna. A disillusioned Mitra leaves the family home, moves to his ancestral house with Latha and Valli's kids, and confronts Chinna, though he cannot bring himself to kill him. Basha intervenes and kills Chinna to avenge Nadia. Distraught, Loki orders the execution of both Mitra and Basha. Basha saves Mitra from an assassination attempt and reveals that years earlier, Loki had murdered Mitra's biological father, Keshava Naidu, while transporting him to a hospital following an attack, using his death to seize political power and marry Savitri.

Mitra confronts Loki over his crimes. A grief-stricken Loki, overwhelmed by Chinna's death and Mitra's hostility, hands Mitra a gun and begs to be killed. Instead, Mitra kneels at Loki's feet, acknowledging that Loki was the only father he ever knew and that he cannot bring himself to murder him. Mitra asks Loki to end the feud for the sake of Savitri, who has fallen into deep depression after losing her children. After Mitra and Basha depart, a disgraced Loki dies by suicide, and Mitra subsequently assumes leadership of the party.

== Cast ==
- Sai Kumar as Ketti Lokanatham Naidu "Loki"
- Sharwanand as Galla Mitranand Naidu alias Mitra
- Sundeep Kishan as Ketti Chinna Naidu, Loki's son; Mitra's step-brother
- Pavitra Lokesh as Ketti Savitri Naidu, Loki's wife; Mitra's mother
- Rashmi Gautam as Nadia Basha, Hamid's daughter and Mitra's friend; Chinna's love interest
- Madhusudhan Rao as Hameed Basha, Nadia's father and Loki's trusted aid-turned-foe
- Surekha Vani as Valli, Keshava, and Savitri's daughter and Mitra's sister; Loki's step-daughter and Chinna's step-sister
- Ruby Parihar as Latha, Mitra's girlfriend
- Vennela Kishore as Goli, Mitra's friend and close confidant
- Jaya Prakash Reddy as Bangaru Naidu
- Mannava Balayya as Galla Dasharatha Rama Naidu, Keshava's father and Mitra and Valli's grandfather
- Ravi Prakash as Galla Keshava Naidu, Dasharatha's son, and Savitri's husband; Mitra and Valli's father
- Jeeva as Reddy
- Natasha Valluri as Nikki
- Prudhvi Raj
- Dil Ramesh

== Production ==
After Vennela, Deva Katta approached Mahesh Babu with a political story script that was also titled Prasthanam. Mahesh Babu rejected the script citing his lack of interest in doing political films. Katta approached Gopichand and Ravi Teja to star in this film, but they rejected the film as they felt the film falls short of their regular heroism in their films. Before choosing Sharwanand, Katta initially considered Jagapathi Babu and Sumanth. This film marked the debut of Ruby Parihar.

== Themes ==
The movie, on one hand, deals with politics at grass root levels that occur in villages of India, corrupt political system and the nexus between businessmen and politicians. On the other hand, the movie deals with themes like greed, ambition and devotion which are driving forces of the lead characters in this movie. A movie-buff argues that the central theme revolves around the quote from the Book of Exodus, Old Testament, –"The sins of the fathers shall be visited upon the children."

== Soundtrack ==
The music was composed by Mahesh Shankar and released by T-Series. The audio launch was held at the former mall Big Bazaar in Ameerpet, Hyderabad on 12 December 2009.

Prasthanam

Soundtrack album by Mahesh Shankar
- Released: 12 December 2009
- Recorded: 2009
- Genre: Soundtrack
- Length: 28:22
- Label: T-Series
- Producer: Mahesh Shankar

Mahesh Shankar chronology
Inkosaari (2010)	Prasthanam (2009)	Bangaru Kodipetta (2013)

No.	Title	Lyrics	Performer(s)	Length
1.	"Payanamae"	Deva Katta	V. V. Prasanna, Niranjanaiah Katta	3:06
2.	"Bedaro"	Chaitanya Prasad	Deepu	3:51
3.	"Evado Vaadu"	Deva Katta	Narayana	4:47
4.	"Murali Lola"	Vanamali	Kalyani, Saindhavi, Rahul Nambiar, Sriram	4:24
5.	"Naayudochaadoe"	Vanamali	V. V. Prasanna	3:34
6.	"Innalluga"	Vanamali	Sahithi, Mahesh Shankar	4:50
7.	"Nee Rendallo"	Vanamali	Karthik, S. Sowmya	3:50
Total length:				28:22

== Reception ==
Jeevi of Idlebrain.com rated the film 3/5 and praised the human nature aspect of the film while criticising its editing. Radhika Rajamani of Rediff.com wrote, "Watch Prasthanam if you like long films with a political backdrop".

== Box office ==
Despite fierce competition from other big budget films, like Simha and Darling, it did modestly well at the box office.

== Awards ==
Nandi Awards

- 2010 - Third Best Feature Film - Bronze - Ravi Vallabhaneni
- 2010 - Best Supporting Actor - Sai Kumar

Filmfare Awards South

- 2010 - Filmfare Award for Best Supporting Actor (Telugu) - Sai Kumar
- 2010 - Filmfare Critics Award for Best Telugu Film - Deva Katta

== See also ==
- Jilla, a partial remake
