= GVK One =

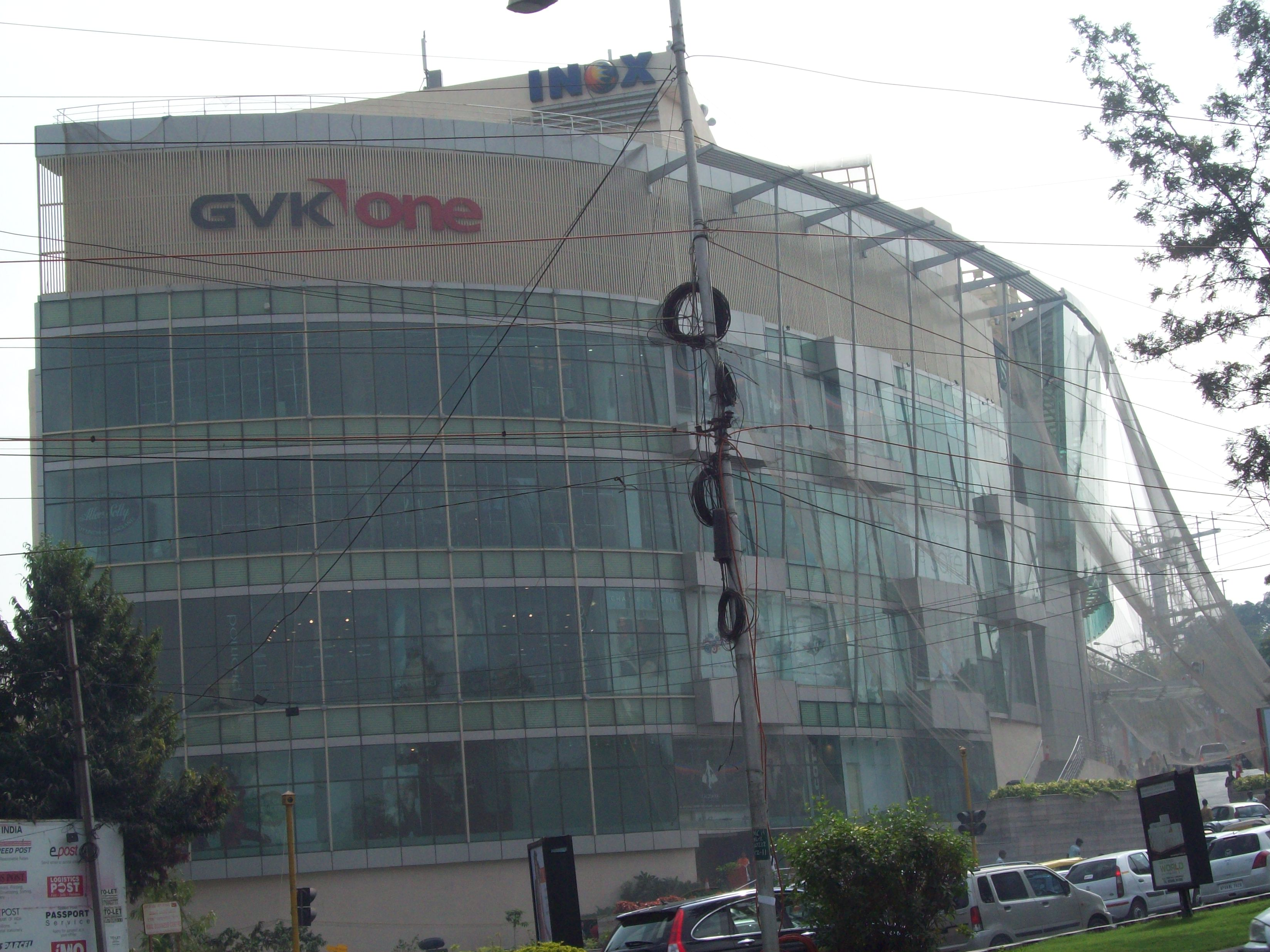
- Location: Banjara Hills, Hyderabad, India
- Coordinates: 17.419217°N 78.448386°E
- Opened: 1 May 2009
- Developer: GVK Group
- Architect: DP Architects Pvt Ltd; M/s Shapoorji Pallonji (main contractor)
- Num. of stores: 70
- Num. of anchor tenants: 1
- Floor area: 350,000 sq ft (33,000 m^{2})
- Floors: 7
- Parking: 700
- Website: gvkone.com

GVK One is a shopping mall located in Banjara Hills, Hyderabad, India. The 350,000 sq ft (33,000 m^{2}) mall was opened to public on 1 May 2009.

== Design ==
GVK One was designed by DP Architects of Singapore and built by Shapoorji Pallonji & Company between 2004 and 2005 under a ₹30 crore civil contract. The 11‑storey reinforced concrete structure features a curtain wall facade combining large glass panels. A central skylit atrium spans the seven public levels, with eight escalators and ten elevators arranged around two elevator cores to facilitate circulation. Five basement floors provide over 300,000 sft of parking for more than 1,000 vehicles, managed by an automated system that guides drivers to available bays.

== Facilities ==
GVK One encompasses approximately 650,000 sq ft of retail and leisure space. The mall has 70 branded stores and its anchor store Shoppers Stop spans 60,000 sq ft (5,600 m^{2}) in three levels. The mall has a six-screen INOX multiplex COVERING OVER 40,000 sft housed in it. The mall is established and promoted by GVK Power and Infrastructure limited. In September 2023, the Greater Hyderabad Municipal Corporation (GHMC) approved the construction of a modern foot overbridge adjacent to GVK One mall on Road No. 1, Banjara Hills. The 55m wide structure was fabricated from mild steel. The bridge will also be equipped with cladding and CCTV cameras to enhance security. Designed to alleviate accidents on one of the city’s busiest roads and to serve the substantial daily footfall generated by the adjacent commercial mall, the overbridge prioritizes both accessibility and safety.
