= Hyderabad Central =

- హైదరాబాద్ సెంట్రల్
- Location: Punjagutta, Hyderabad, India
- Coordinates: 17.426401°N 78.453079°E
- Opened: November 2004
- Owner: Pantaloon Retail
- Floors: 12 [4 are locked and two are parking. Rest 6 floors are shopping floors (0-5)]
- Parking: 150 + 150 (valet)
- Website: pantaloons.com

Hyderabad Central is a shopping mall in Hyderabad, India, located on the Punjagutta road. The mall includes Marks and Spencer, as well as a range of movies, music, books, coffee shops, a food court, supermarket and restaurants. The shopping space is spread over four levels, with PVR Cinemas located on the top (fifth) floor with a total area of 250,000 sq.ft.

The mall was launched in November 2004 when the owners, Pantaloon Retail (India) Limited, at the same time also announced plans to create 12 to 15 malls across India within two years. An investment of some 701 million rupees (approx. US$15.5 million) was made in this mall, which was the second large-scale mall in the country, the first being in Bangalore. In 2005, it was alleged that plans only showed four theatres, however after the construction of five theatres a lengthy legal battle ensued.

Hyderabad Central has the slogan "Brand. New"
