= Anantha Sriram =

Indian songwriter (born 1984)

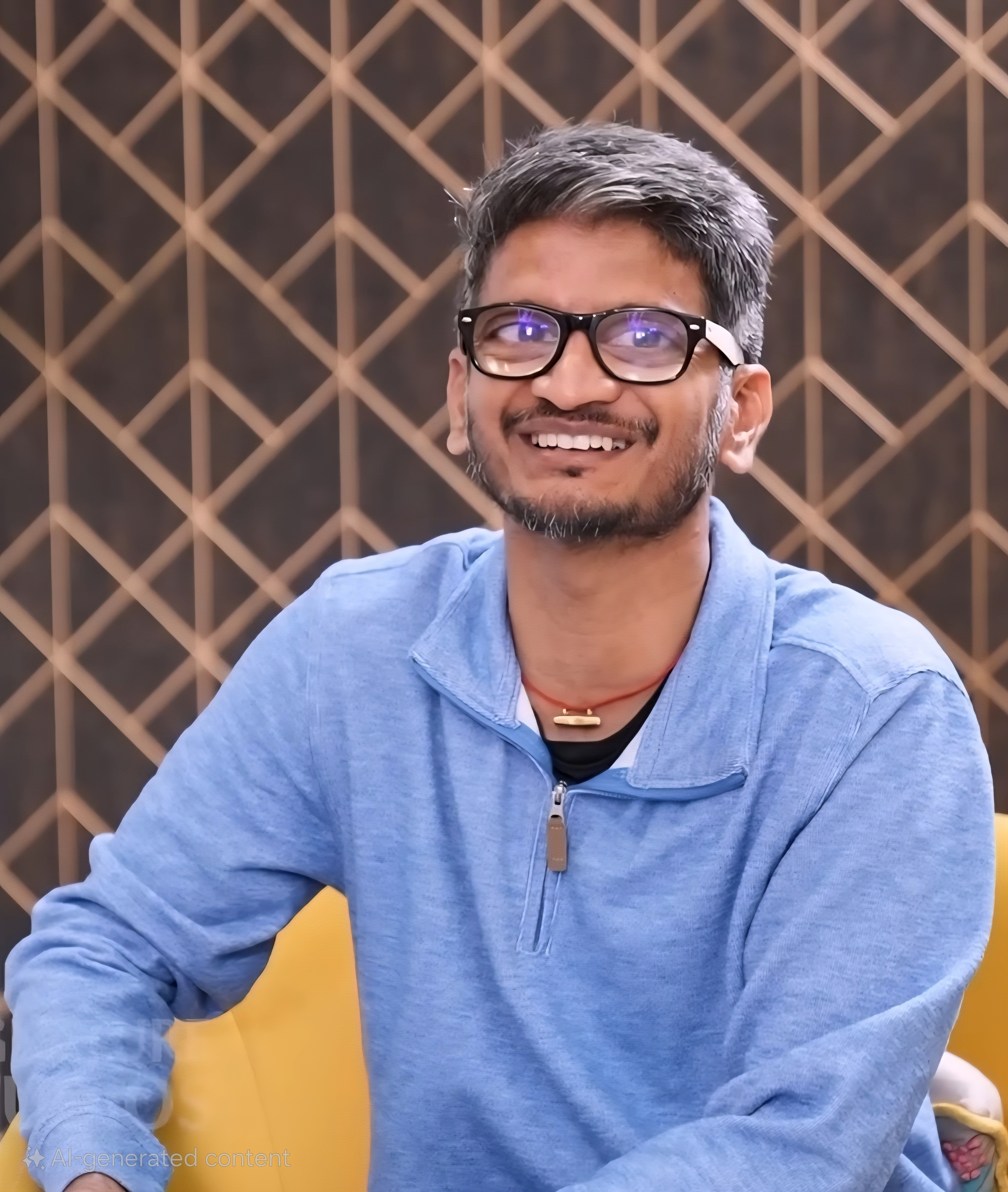
- Born: Chegondi Anantha Sriram; 8 April 1984 (age 42); Doddipatla, Andhra Pradesh, India
- Other name: Anantha Sriram
- Occupation: Lyricist
- Years active: 2005–present

Chegondi Anantha Sriram is an Indian lyricist, poet and actor who works in Telugu cinema. Sriram has written lyrics for over 1000 Telugu film songs in his career. He won a Nandi Award, two Filmfare Award and two SIIMA Awards for his work as a lyric writer.

== Early life ==
Anantha Sriram was born on 8 April 1984 in Doddipatla village near Palakollu in West Godavari district. His parents are C. V. V. Satyanarayana and Umarani. Anantha Sriram is a relative of politician Chegondi Harirama Jogaiah. He started writing songs from the age of 12.

== Career ==
Kadante Aunanile (2005) was the first film he worked on. He gained prominence after he wrote songs for Chiranjeevi's Andarivaadu and Stalin. He has worked with top music directors including A. R. Rahman, Keeravani and Illayaraja.

He received a Filmfare Award for Best Lyricist – Telugu for Yeto Vellipoyindhi Manasu in 2013. He also made a cameo appearance in the film Saakshyam (2018) as a game designer.

== Discography ==
Year	Work	Song(s)
2026	Peddi	"Rai Rai Raa Raa", "Hellallallo",”Massa Massa”
2026	Mana Shankara Vara Prasad Garu	"Sasirekha"
2026	Sahakutumbaanaam	"Title Song", "Adhi Dha Saaru", "ABCDF", "Fake Saales"
2025	Paanch Minar	"Em Bathukura Naadi"
2025	Sankranthiki Vasthunam	"Meenu", "Guruvarya", "Chinna Raju"
2025	Daaku Maharaaj	"The Rage of Daaku", "Chinni"
2025	Game Changer	"Jaragandi", "Raa Macha Macha"
2024	The Family Star	"Nandanandana", "Kalyani Vaccha Vacchaa"
2023	Hi Nanna	" Odiyamma", "Enno Enno", "Asalelaa", "Samayama"
2023	Animal (Dubbed Telugu version only)	"Ammayi", "Nanna Nuv Naa Pranam", "Ney Veyrey", "Yaalo Yaalaa", "Kashmeeru", "Evarevaro", "Yaalo Yaalaa" (Extended film version), "Evarevaro" (Soul version)
2023	Nijam With Smita	"Episode 1 Closing Song", "Episode 2 Closing Song", "Episode 3 Closing Song", "Episode 4 Closing Song", "Episode 5 Closing Song", "Episode 7 Closing Song", "Episode 8 Closing Song", "Episode 9 Closing Song"
2023	Skanda	"Gandarabai"
2023	Ghar Banduk Biryani (Dubbed Telugu version only)	"Aaha Hero", "Ichchipadey"
2023	Baby	"O Rendu Prema Meghaalila"
2022	Ori Devuda	"Paathasalalo"
2022	Highway	"Kommallo"
2022	Ponniyin Selvan: I (Dubbed version)	All Songs
2022	The Life of Muthu (Dubbed version)	"Marachipomanna", "Ninnu Talachitey"
2022	Sarkaru Vaari Paata	All songs
2022	Godfather	"Thaar Maar Thakkar Maar", "Najabhaja"
2022	Shekar	"Kinnera"
2022	Sita Ramam	"Oh Sita Hey Rama"
2022	Rowdy Boys	"Nuvve Na Dhairyam" (along with Sri Mani)
2022	Acharya	"Neelambari"
2021	Akhanda	"Akhada Title Song", "Jai Balayya"
2021	Manchi Rojulochaie	"Ekkesinde Ekkesinde"
2021	Richie Gadi Pelli	"Emitidhi Mathiledha Pranamaa"
2021	Varudu Kaavalenu	"Digu Digu Digu Naaga"
2021	Most Eligible Bachelor	"Guche Gulabi"
2021	Narappa	"Chalaaki Chinnammi"
2021	Paagal	"Saradaga Kasepaina"
2021	A: Ad Infinitum	All Songs
2021	Master (Dubbed version)	"Chitti Story"
2020	Choosi Choodangaane	"Nee Parichayamutho", "Venkane Vunaa"
2019	Sye Raa Narasimha Reddy	"Andam Ankitam"
2019	Guna 369	" Bujji Bangaram"
2019	Thoota (Dubbed version)	"Maruvaali"
2018	Saakshyam	All songs
2018	2.0 (Dubbed version)	"Yanthara Lokapu sundarive"
2018	Geetha Govindam	"Inkem Inkem Inkem Kaavaale"
2017	Arjun Reddy	"Emitemitemo", "Dhooram"
2016	Ghatana	All songs
2016	Sahasam Swasaga Sagipo	"Chakori", "Taanu Nenu"
2016	Speedunnodu	"Gurrani Cheruvu Daaka"
2016	Sarrainodu	"You Are My MLA"
2016	Nirmala Convent	All songs, "Mundhu Nuyya" with Chandrabose
2015	Baahubali: The Beginning	"Pachcha Bottesi"
2015	Nenu Sailaja	"Masti Masti"
2015	Kumari 21F	"Meghaalu Lekunna" with Sri Mani
2015	Size Zero	All songs
2015	Courier Boy Kalyan	All songs
2015	Yevade Subramanyam	"Challagali Takuthunna, O kala"
2015	Gopala Gopala	"Bhaje Bhaaje"
2015	I (Dubbed version)	"Poolane Kunukeyamanta"
2015	Janda Pai Kapiraju	All songs
2015	Loukyam	"Ninnu Chudagane"
2014	Raja Rani	All songs
2014	Oka Laila Kosam	"Teluse Nuvvu ravani"
2014	Rabhasa	"Hawa Hawa"
2014	Autonagar Surya	All songs
2014	Bhimavaram Bullodu	"Super Manula Marinanura Va"
2014	Yamaleela 2	All songs
2014	Vikramasimha	"Yedemaina Sakha", "Yedemaina Sakhi"
2014	Oohalu Gusagusalade	"Emiti Hadavidi", "Em Sandeham Ledu"
2014	Lingaa (Dubbed version)	"Vo Manmadhaa"
2013	Bangaru Kodipetta	All songs
2013	Raja Rani	All songs
2013	Seethamma Vakitlo Sirimalle Chettu	"Aaraduguluntara", "Inka Cheppale", "Seethamma Vakitlo", "Vaana Chinukulu"
2013	Sahasam	All songs
2013	Anthaka Mundu Aa Tarvatha	"Hey Kanipettey", "Thamari Thone", "Ye Inti Ammayive"
2013	Bhai	"Nemmadiga"
2013	Aadu Magaadra Bujji	"Adede Tholiprema"
2013	Chammak Challo	"Simplega Cheppala", "Chandamamapai Kundelaa", "O Meri Mehabooba", "Naa Kallalona"
2013	Greeku Veerudu	"Osina Bangaram"
2012	Poola Rangadu	"Poola Rangadu"
2012	Denikaina Ready	"Pilla Neevalla"
2012	Yeto Vellipoyindhi Manasu	All songs
2012	Routine Love Story	"Naa Manasupai", "Yeppatikaina", "Nee Varasa Neede"
2012	Life is Beautiful	"Life Is Beautiful", "Atu Itu Ooguthu", "Its Your Love", "Life Is Beautiful Pop"
2012	Sudigadu	"Yenduke Cheli"
2012	Sarocharu	"Gusa-Gusa"
2012	Eega	"Konchem Konchem"
2012	Lovely	"Chori Choriye", "Ninnu Chusina", "Nenunnadi"
2012	Ishq	"Edho Edho", "Sutiga Choodaku"
2012	Body Guard	"Hosannaa", "Oh My God"
2012	Nippu	"Dhiya Dhiya"
2012	Genius	All songs
2012	Gundello Godari	"Jillumandi", "Nanu Neetho", "Ekkadundhi Naa Kodi"
2012	Nuvva Nena	"Tha Tha Thamara"
2012	Vetadu Ventadu	"Andham Andham", "Vennellona Aduthunna'"
2012	David Billa (Dubbed version)	All songs
2011	Rajanna	"Chittiguvva", "Okka Kshanam", "Raa Ree Ro Rela"
2011	Ala Modalaindi	"Innaallu Naa Kallu Ammammo Ammo"
2011	Prema Kavali	"Dum Dum Dolu Baaje", "Chirunavve Visirave", "Manasanta Mukkalu Chesi"
2011	Mr. Perfect	"Rao Gari Abbai", "Chali Chaliga", "Aakasam Badhalaina"
2010	Mirapakay	"Adigora Choodu"
2010	Brindavanam	"Nijamena Nijamena", "Suride Suride Chooppulo Suride", "Chinnadho Vypu Pedhadho Vypu"
2010	Oosaravelli	"Niharika", "Dandiya India"
2010	Dhada	"Hello Hello", "Telugu Bengali", "Chinnaga Chinnaga"
2010	Nanna (Dubbed version)	All songs
2010	Maryada Ramanna	"Ammayi Kitiki Pakkana", "Telugammayi"
2010	Subhapradam	"Mouname Chebutondi", "Yelelo Yelelo"
2010	Rama Rama Krishna Krishna	All songs
2010	Darling	"Hoshare", "Inka Aedo", "Neeve", "Pranama", "Yeyo"
2010	Manasara	All songs with Bhaskarabhatla
2010	Baava	"Pannendella Praayam"
2010	Gaayam 2	"Endukamma Prema Prema"
2010	Yagam	All songs
2010	Seeta Ramula Kalyanam	"Naa Kallalo"
2010	Ye Maaya Chesaave	All songs
2009	Oy!	"Saradaga"
2009	Kurradu	All songs
2009	Thoranai	"Pistha"
2009	Mitrudu	"By Birth", "Don't Touch Me"
2009	Aakasamantha	"Aatala Patala", "Veechi Gali"
2009	Arundhati	"Chandamama"
2009	Satyameva Jayate	All songs except "Saaganee"
2009	Sasirekha Parinayam	"Bejawada, Gundello Golisoda," "O Bujjamma", "Yedho Yedho"
2009	Inkosaari	"Life Oka Saturday"
2009	Aakasa Ramanna	All songs
2008	Malli Malli	"Magic Magic Magic"
2008	Kotha Bangaru Lokam	"Nijangaa Nenena"
2008	Parugu	"Nammavemo", "Yelageyalaga", "Manakanna Podiche"
2008	Kantri	"I Go Crazy," "Janthar Manthar"
2008	Drona	Vaade Vaade, Yem Maaya
2008	Ullasamga Utsahamga	"Priyathama"
2008	Baladur	"Yetu Podam Cheppamma"
2008	Souryam	"Ammi Ammi"
2007	Chandamama	"Naalo Oohalaku"
2007	Yamadonga	"Nuvvu Muttukunte", "Rabbaru Gajulu", "Noonogameesoludu"
2007	Munna	"Vastava Vastava"
2007	Sangamam	"Poothavesina", "Santhosham", "Palarathi Silpaniki", "Chinuku", "Are You An Angel"
2007	Maharathi	"Mangamma Mangamma"
2006	Stalin	"Go Go Gova", "Tauba Re Tauba", "Parare Parare"
2006	Bommarillu	"Apudo Ipudo Epudo" along with Kula Shekar"
2006	Evandoi Srivaru	All songs
2005	Andarivadu	"Chilipi Srugarama"
2005	Oka Oorilo	All songs except "Chandamama Okati'"
2005	Kaadante Avunanile	All songs

== Filmography ==
Year	Title	Role
2013	Welcome Obama	
2018	Saakshyam	Valmiki
2023	Rangabali	Parasuram’s secretary
2025	Sankranthiki Vasthunam	Prem Pandey

=== Television ===
Year	Work	Role	Network
2022	Sa Re Ga Ma Pa The Singing Superstar	Judge	Zee Telugu
2023	Sa Re Ga Ma Pa Championship	Judge	Zee Telugu
2023	Super Singer 3 Telugu	Judge	Star Maa
2023	Nijam With Smita	Writer	SonyLIV

== Awards ==
- Filmfare Award for Best Lyricist – Telugu – Baby in 2024
- Filmfare Award for Best Lyricist – Telugu – Yeto Vellipoyindhi Manasu in 2013
- SIIMA Award for Best Lyricist – Telugu – Seethamma Vakitlo Sirimalle Chettu in 2014
- SIIMA Award for Best Lyricist – Telugu – Baby in 2024
- Maa Music Awards 2012 – Best Love Song (Jury)
- Nandi Award for Best Lyricist for Yeto Vellipoyindhi Manasu
- Mirchi Music Awards South 2021 – Lyricist of the Decade "Taanu Nenu" from Sahasam Swasaga Sagipo
- 3rd IIFA Utsavam - Lyricist - "O Rendu Prema Meghaalila" from Baby in 2024
