= Deva Katta =

Indian film director

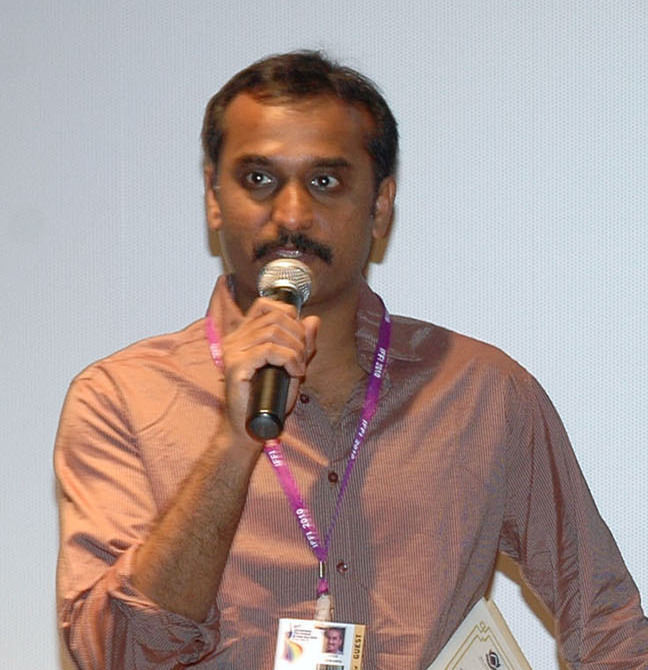
- Katta at IFFI (2010)
- Born: May 24; Eluru, Andhra Pradesh
- Education: Wayne State University
- Occupations: Film director; producer; screenwriter
- Years active: 1999–present

Deva Katta is an Indian American film director and screenwriter who works in Telugu cinema. He directed movies such as Vennela (2005), Prasthanam (2010), Autonagar Surya (2014), and Republic (2021). In 2010, Prasthanam was showcased in the Indian Panorama section at the International Film Festival of India. The film also won two Filmfare awards including Filmfare South Critics Award for Best Film and Nandi Award for Best Feature Film in 2010.

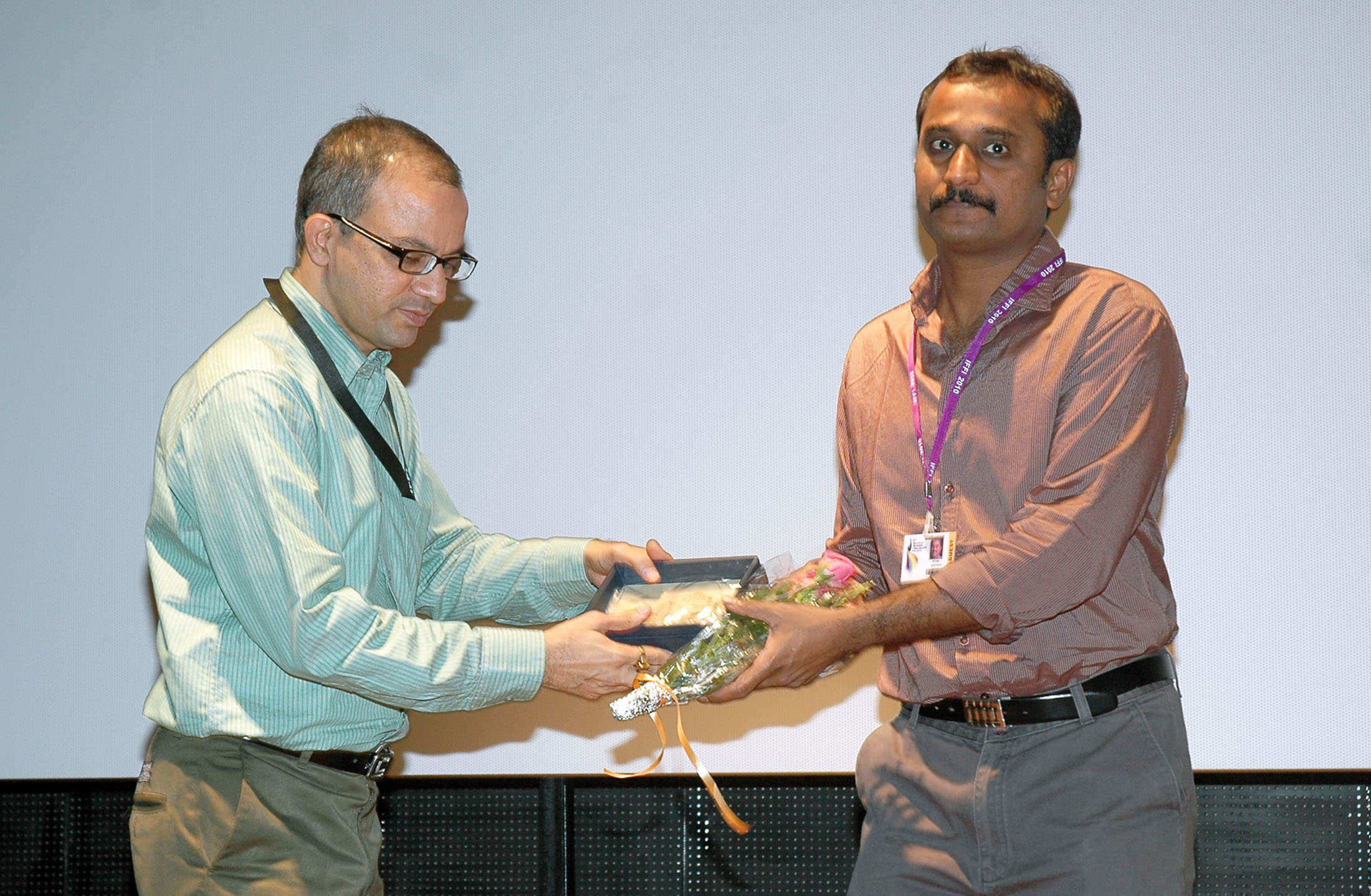
Deva Katta (right), being felicitated at IFFI (2016)

== Early life ==
Deva Katta was born in Eluru, Andhra Pradesh. His father, Niranjan Naidu Katta, hails from Kadapa, while his mother hails from Tirupathi, Andhra Pradesh. He moved to Chennai in 1985. He holds a Master of Science degree in mechanical engineering from Wayne State University, Detroit, Michigan. He worked as a vehicle crashworthiness expert at General Motors. He is a naturalized American citizen.

== Career ==
He graduated from film school before making a television serial about Indian students in the United States shot from 1999 to 2000 titled Valasa. He shorten the serial into a film in 2003; however, it was not released. He then made his feature film debut with the romantic comedy flick Vennela on the same topic while additionally including a love story.

In 2015, Katta teamed up with actor Vishnu Manchu for the film Dynamite, a remake of the Tamil film Arima Nambi (2014), and Katta's only remake till date. Katta, however, said that he shot the film for only nine days and walked out due to creative differences. Katta was credited as the film's director nonetheless.

In one of his interviews, he mentioned that Prasthanam, Autonagar Surya, and Republic are part of his quadrilogy of the society which show the perspective of a Politician (Legislative), Common Man (Voter), and Bureaucrat (Executive) on society. He is currently working on the final part of the quadrilogy which will show the perspective of a Judicial (Judiciary) on society.

== Filmography ==
=== Feature films ===
Key
†	Denotes films that have not yet been released

- Note: all films are in Telugu, unless otherwise noted.

As director

Films as a director
Year	Title	Notes	Ref.
2005	Vennela	Credited as Deva Kaushik Katta	
2010	Prasthanam	International Film Festival of India; Nandi Award for Best Feature Film (Bronze); Filmfare Critics Award for Best Telugu Film	
2014	Autonagar Surya		
2019	Prassthanam	Hindi remake of Prasthanam	
2021	Republic		

As writer and producer

Films as a writer and producer
Year	Title	Writer	Producer	Notes	Ref.
2015	Bahubali: The Beginning	Yes	No	Dialogues for a sequence	
2026	Hitmen Prod No.1	No	Creative		
2027	Varanasi †	Dialogues	No		

=== Television ===
List of web series directed and written
Year	Title	Streaming Service	Notes
2025	Mayasabha: Rise of the Titans	SonyLIV	

=== Short films ===
List of short films directed and written by Katta
Year	Title	Language	Notes	Ref.
	The People Mover	English	Released in film festivals; also actor	
2015	Dying to Be Me	English		

=== Acting roles ===
- D for Dopidi (2013) as A.C.P. Krishnamachari
