= List of accolades received by Dookudu =

Dookudu (transl. Aggression) is a 2011 Indian Telugu-language action comedy film directed by Srinu Vaitla, and jointly produced by Ram Achanta, Gopi Achanta and Anil Sunkara. The film features Mahesh Babu, Samantha, Prakash Raj, and Sonu Sood in the lead roles, and Brahmanandam, and M. S. Narayana in supporting roles. It was edited by M. R. Varma and the cinematography was provided by K. V. Guhan and Prasad Murella. The film's musical and background score were composed by S. Thaman.

Partially inspired by the 2003 German tragicomedy film Good Bye, Lenin!, Dookudu revolves around the life of police officer Ajay Kumar (Mahesh). His father Shankar Narayana (Prakash Raj) awakes from a coma, which he has been in for many years after an accident, but his health remains perilous. To aid his recovery, Kumar masquerades as a Member of the Legislative Assembly fulfilling his father's ambition for him.

Dookudu was released on 23 September 2011 in 1,600 screens worldwide, and grossed ₹1.01 billion (Note: The average exchange rate in 2011 was 51.10 Indian rupees (₹) per 1 US dollar (US$).) worldwide on a budget of ₹350 million. Steven Zeitchik of Los Angeles Times called it "the biggest hit you've never heard of". The film garnered awards and nominations in several categories with particular praise for its direction, performances of the film's cast, cinematography, and music. As of April 2013, the film has won 38 awards from 50 nominations. (Note: Awards in certain categories do not have prior nominations and only winners are announced by the jury. For simplification and to avoid errors, each award in this list has been presumed to have had a prior nomination.)

At the 2012 Nandi Awards ceremony, Dookudu won seven awards, including those for Best Popular Feature Film and Best Actor. The film won six awards at the 59th Filmfare Awards South ceremony, including the awards for Best Film, Best Director, and Best Actor, from ten nominations. Samantha and Prakash Raj also garnered nominations for Best Actress and Best Supporting Actor, respectively. Dookudu received eleven nominations at the 1st South Indian International Movie Awards ceremony and won eight awards, including those for Best Film, Best Director and Best Actor. Samantha and M. S. Narayana were nominated for Best Actress and Best Comedian, respectively. The film won eight awards at the 2012 CineMAA Awards ceremony, including those for Best Film, Best Director, Best Actor, and Best Cinematography.

== Accolades ==
Award	Date of ceremony (Note: Date is linked to the article about the awards held that year, wherever possible.)	Category	Recipients	Result	Ref.
Audi — Ritz Icon Awards	1 October 2012	Iconic Film of the Year – Telugu	Ram Achanta, Gopichand Achanta and Anil Sunkara	Won	
Audi — Ritz Icon Awards	1 October 2012	Best Director	Srinu Vaitla	Won	
CineMAA Awards	17 June 2012	Best Film	Ram Achanta, Gopichand Achanta and Anil Sunkara	Won	
CineMAA Awards	17 June 2012	Best Director	Srinu Vaitla	Won	
CineMAA Awards	17 June 2012	Best Actor	Mahesh Babu	Won	
CineMAA Awards	17 June 2012	Best Supporting Actor	Prakash Raj	Won	
CineMAA Awards	17 June 2012	Best Actor In Negative Role	Sonu Sood	Won	
CineMAA Awards	17 June 2012	Best Actor In Comic Role	Brahmanandam	Won	
CineMAA Awards	17 June 2012	Best Actor (Jury)	M. S. Narayana	Won	
CineMAA Awards	17 June 2012	Best Cinematographer	K. V. Guhan	Won	
59th Filmfare Awards South	7 July 2012	Best Film – Telugu	Ram Achanta, Gopichand Achanta and Anil Sunkara	Won	
59th Filmfare Awards South	7 July 2012	Best Director – Telugu	Srinu Vaitla	Won	
59th Filmfare Awards South	7 July 2012	Best Actor – Telugu	Mahesh Babu	Won	
59th Filmfare Awards South	7 July 2012	Best Actress – Telugu	Samantha	Nominated	
59th Filmfare Awards South	7 July 2012	Best Supporting Actor – Telugu	M. S. Narayana	Won	
59th Filmfare Awards South	7 July 2012	Best Supporting Actor – Telugu	Prakash Raj	Nominated	
59th Filmfare Awards South	7 July 2012	Best Music Director – Telugu	S. Thaman	Won	
59th Filmfare Awards South	7 July 2012	Best Male Playback Singer – Telugu	Rahul Nambiar (for the song "Guruvaram")	Won	
59th Filmfare Awards South	7 July 2012	Best Female Playback Singer – Telugu	Ramya NSK (for the song "Poovai Poovai")	Nominated	
59th Filmfare Awards South	7 July 2012	Best Lyricist – Telugu	Ramajogayya Sastry (for the song "Guruvaram")	Nominated	
Mirchi Music Awards South	4 August 2012	Best Album of the Year	S. Thaman	Won	
Mirchi Music Awards South	4 August 2012	Music Composer of the year	S. Thaman	Nominated	
Mirchi Music Awards South	4 August 2012	Best Song of the Year	S. Thaman, Rahul Nambiar and Ramajogayya Sastry (for the song "Guruvaram")	Nominated	
Mirchi Music Awards South	4 August 2012	Male Vocalist of the Year	Rahul Nambiar (for the song "Guruvaram")	Nominated	
Mirchi Music Awards South	4 August 2012	Upcoming Female Vocalist of the Year	Ramya NSK (for the song "Poovai Poovai")	Won	
Mirchi Music Awards South	4 August 2012	Lyricist of the Year	Ramajogayya Sastry (for the song "Guruvaram")	Nominated	
Mirchi Music Awards South	4 August 2012	Technical – Sound Mixing of the Year	Chandu, Shadab Rayeen and Muralidhar (for the song "Guruvaram")	Nominated	
Nandi Awards	13 October 2012	Best Popular Feature Film	Ram Achanta, Gopichand Achanta and Anil Sunkara	Won	
Nandi Awards	13 October 2012	Best Actor	Mahesh Babu	Won	
Nandi Awards	13 October 2012	Best Supporting Actor	Prakash Raj	Won	
Nandi Awards	13 October 2012	Best Male Comedian	M. S. Narayana	Won	
Nandi Awards	13 October 2012	Best Editor	M. R. Varma	Won	
Nandi Awards	13 October 2012	Best Fight Master	Vijayan	Won	
Nandi Awards	13 October 2012	Best Screenplay Writer	Srinu Vaitla	Won	
1st South Indian International Movie Awards	22 June 2012	Best Film-Telugu	Ram Achanta, Gopichand Achanta and Anil Sunkara	Won	
1st South Indian International Movie Awards	22 June 2012	Best Director (Telugu)	Srinu Vaitla	Won	
1st South Indian International Movie Awards	22 June 2012	Best Actor (Telugu)	Mahesh Babu	Won	
1st South Indian International Movie Awards	22 June 2012	Best Actress (Telugu)	Samantha	Nominated	
1st South Indian International Movie Awards	22 June 2012	Best Supporting Actor (Telugu)	Prakash Raj	Won	
1st South Indian International Movie Awards	22 June 2012	Best Comedian (Telugu)	Brahmanandam	Won	
1st South Indian International Movie Awards	22 June 2012	Best Comedian (Telugu)	M. S. Narayana	Nominated	
1st South Indian International Movie Awards	22 June 2012	Best Music Director (Telugu)	S. Thaman	Won	
1st South Indian International Movie Awards	22 June 2012	Best Male Playback Singer (Telugu)	Rahul Nambiar (for the song "Guruvaram")	Won	
1st South Indian International Movie Awards	22 June 2012	Best Lyricist (Telugu)	Ramajogayya Sastry (for the song "Guruvaram")	Won	
1st South Indian International Movie Awards	22 June 2012	Best Cinematographer (Telugu)	K. V. Guhan	Nominated	
TSR–TV9 National Film Awards 2011	20 April 2013	Best Director	Srinu Vaitla	Won	
TSR–TV9 National Film Awards 2011	20 April 2013	Best Character Actor	Prakash Raj	Won	
TSR–TV9 National Film Awards 2011	20 April 2013	Best Comedian	Brahmanandam	Won	
TSR–TV9 National Film Awards 2011	20 April 2013	Best Music Director	S. Thaman	Won	
TSR–TV9 National Film Awards 2011	20 April 2013	Best Playback Singer – Female	Ramya NSK (for the song "Poovai Poovai")	Won	

== See also ==
- List of Telugu films of 2011
