= Blue Planet Entertainments =

Indian film production company

Blue Planet Entertainments LLP
- Industry: Entertainment
- Headquarters: India
- Area served: India
- Products: Films
- Owner: Kiran Reddy Mandadi, CH Bharath Chowdary
- Website: Blue Planet Entertainments LLp

Blue Planet Entertainments LLP is an Indian film production company established by Kiran Reddy Mandadi and CH Bharath Chowdary. The company is based in Hyderabad and has produced around 3 films in Telugu languages delivered several successful projects from the beginning, the film Nene Raju Nene Mantri directed by Teja, featuring Rana Daggubati, Kajal Aggarwal, Catherine Tresa, and Navdeep in the lead roles.

== Film production ==
As a production house, Blue Planet Entertainments LLP has been gaining popularity in the recent years. Nene Raju Nene Mantri a Telugu film starring Rana Daggubati was a blockbuster at the box office.

In February 2016, filmmaker Teja signed Telugu actor Rajasekhar to play a negative role in his directorial Aham. Sneha was approached to play the female lead in the film. It was shelved in April 2016 due to both creative and personal differences. P. Satyanarayana Reddy, the film's producer, wanted another actor to play the lead role. Teja approached Rana Daggubati and gained his consent. Rana's father Daggubati Suresh Babu suggested Kajal Aggarwal for the female lead role, who was signed later. Daggubati was completing his portions in The Ghazi Attack (2017) and was about to join the sets of Baahubali 2: The Conclusion when Teja approached him. They worked on the script for eight months, writing different versions. Lyricist Lakshmi Bhoopal, who was supposed to work with Teja for three of his earlier films, was chosen to pen the dialogues. Teja also approached R. Rathnavelu to handle the film's cinematography.

The film was titled Nene Raju Nene Mantri; Venkat C. Dileep and Kotagiri Venkateswara Rao were recruited as the cinematographer and editor respectively. Anoop Rubens composed the film's soundtrack and background score. Babu, along with Kiran Reddy and Bharath Chowdary, jointly bankrolled the film under their banners Suresh Productions and Blue Planet Entertainments. Nene Raju Nene Mantri was Aggarwal's 50th film as an actor. Catherine Tresa, Navdeep and Ashutosh Rana were cast in supporting roles.

MLA (Manchi Lakshanalunna Abbai) (English: A boy with good qualities), is a 2018 Telugu language drama film written and directed by Upendra Madhav who earlier worked as a writer for films such as Bruce Lee and Aagadu. Starring Nandamuri Kalyan Ram, and Kajal Aggarwal, it was produced by Kiran Reddy, Bharath Chowdary, TG Viswa Prasad, and Vivek Kuchibhotla under Blue Planet Entertainments banner, their second venture after Nene Raju Nene Mantri. The film was released on 23 March 2018. The film was also later dubbed into Hindi as MLA Ka Power and released on YouTube by Aditya Music India Pvt Ltd on 12 September 2018.

=== Telugu Cinema ===
No	Year	Film	Language	Actors	Director	Notes
1	2017	Nene Raju Nene Mantri	Telugu	Rana Daggubati, Kajal Aggarwal	Teja	
2	2018	MLA (2018 Telugu film)	Telugu	Nandamuri Kalyan Ram, Kajal Aggarwal,	Upendra Madhav	
2	2018	SillyFellows (2018 film)	Telugu	Allari Naresh, Sunil (actor),	Bhimaneni Srinivasa Rao	
