= Kandula =

Kandula is a Telugu surname. Notable people with the name include:

- Kandula Durgesh, Indian politician
- Kandula Mallikarjuna Rao, Indian music composer and singer
- Kandula Obul Reddy, Indian politician
- Jaahnavi Kandula, Indian student killed in a road accident in the US
- Sai Varshith Kandula, suspect in a 2023 plot against the President of the United States

== See also ==
- Kandula (elephant), Sri Lankan war elephant of c.100 BC
- Kandula Palem, village in Ramachandrapuram mandal in Andhra Pradesh
