= Upendra Madhav =

Indian film screenwriter & director

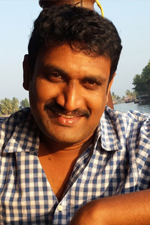
- Born: 26 July 1978 (age 48); Guntur, India
- Education: Nagarjuna University
- Occupations: Screenwriter, director
- Years active: 2006–present
- Relatives: Priyadarshini Ram

Upendra Madhav is an Indian film screenwriter, director and dialogue writer known for his works in Telugu cinema. He is known for his works in box office hits such as Baadshah and Dookudu alongside working in films like Aagadu and BruceLee-The fighter.

== Selected filmography ==
=== Career ===
He came to the Telugu film industry wanting to become a director. He worked with Priyadarshini Ram as an assistant director for Manodu and Toss and directed some corporate films and films for the government. He would get a chance to join the direction department of big budget films but one thing led to another and he became a screenwriter including writing for Dookudu as associate writer which led to further screenwriting. His debut as a feature film director was the 2018 film MLA.

=== As a director ===
Year	Film	Notes
2018	MLA	Debut film
TBA	Netri - The Leader †	Debut Bangladeshi Film, Filming

=== As a writer ===
Year	Film	Credits
2006	Manodu	Associate Director
2007	Toss	Chief Associate Director
2009	Magadheera	Associate Writer
2011	Dookudu	Script Associate
2013	Action 3D	Dialogue Writer
2013	Shadow	Script Associate
2014	Pandavulu Pandavulu Thummeda	Associate Writer
2014	Aagadu	Story & Dialogue Writer
2015	Bruce Lee	Associate Writer
2018	MLA	Story & Dialogue Writer
2022	Netri - The Leader	Writer

== Website and Blog ==
- "Website".
- "Facebook". Facebook.
- "Wordpress Blog".
