= WWW (film) =

2021 film by K. V. Guhan

WWW: Who Where Why
- Official release poster
- Directed by: K. V. Guhan
- Written by: K. V. Guhan
- Produced by: Ravi Prasad Raju Datla
- Starring: Adith Arun; Shivani Rajashekar
- Cinematography: K. V. Guhan
- Edited by: Tammiraju
- Music by: Simon K. King
- Production company: Ramantra Creations
- Distributed by: SonyLIV
- Release date: 24 December 2021
- Running time: 103 minutes
- Country: India
- Languages: Telugu; Tamil

WWW: Who Where Why is a 2021 Indian Telugu-language computer screen thriller film written, directed and filmed by K. V. Guhan and produced by Ramantra Creations. It stars Adith Arun and Shivani Rajashekar while Satyam Rajesh and Priyadarshi play supporting roles. The film's score and soundtrack is composed by Simon K. King. WWW is markerted as the first computer screen film in Telugu cinema. The plot follows a few friends from different cities who meet on video conferencing but one of them is threatened to be murdered.

The film was partially reshot in Tamil language with Sathish and Rajkumar replacing Rajesh and Priyadarshi. It was released on 24 December 2021 on the streaming service SonyLIV.

== Plot ==
Four friends—Vishwa, Ashraf, Sadha, and Christy—who live in different cities of India are criminals involved in cybercrime. They hack computers for money in video conferencing.

Mitra, a painter, joins Christy's room as her flatmate. Vishwa then recommends a job for Mitra's brother which makes her happy and both become friends. She explains that her father lost his job because of the false blame of erasing all important data. Vishwa then feels bad as he was the one behind it. Slowly, Vishwa starts loving her and decides to propose. After his proposal, Mitra accepts his love by gifting him a painting. When they are about to meet all flights get cancelled due to the lockdown. Later they start a video call and decide not to hang up until they meet.

Things change when an unknown man attacks Mitra and Christy. He stabs Christy and ties Mitra to a chair. Vishwa who was seeing it all gets tensed and pleads to the man not to harm them. But the man threatens to kill them if Vishwa doesn't obey his words. He asks Vishwa to reveal his original identity to Mitra. The man then asks to reveal the identity of his friends Sadha and Ashraf but he initially refuses. The man then tries to kill Mitra. Vishwa with no other option left reveals their identity. The man then sends their identity to Khan (a cyber security officer). Vishwa also sends a secret message along with the identity. With that Khan sees that Mitra is in danger so he goes to the location sent to arrest the unknown man.

The man then tells why he was doing this. He reveals that he had developed a game by selling everything he had. It is told that Vishwa hacks the game and sells the data to a big company. He says that his wife had committed suicide and he wanted Vishwa to face the pain that he was facing so he tries to kill Mitra.

Soon, Khan comes to rescue Mitra and Christy and arrests the man. In the end, Vishwa and his friends start working for the police while Mitra and Vishwa get married and are expecting a baby.

== Cast ==
- Adith Arun as Vishwa
- Shivani Rajashekar as Mitra
- Sandeep Bhardwaj as Sandeep
- Riyaz Khan as Khan
- Satyam Rajesh as Sada (Telugu) / Sathish (Tamil)
- Priyadarshi as Ashraf (Telugu) / Rajkumar (Tamil)
- Divya Sripada as Christy
- Viva Harsha
- Vennela Ramarao

== Production ==
The film is directed by veteran cinematographer K. V. Guhan and produced by Ravi Prasad Raju Datla under Ramantra Creations. WWW was shot as a computer screen film in Hyderabad and Chennai. It was filmed during the COVID-19 lockdown in India and completed in January 2021. The film is presented by D. Suresh Babu of Suresh Productions.

== Music ==
The soundtrack album consists of four songs, all composed by Simon K. King, and released on Aditya Music.

Original soundtrack (Telugu)
| No. | Title | Lyrics | Singer(s) | Length |
|---|---|---|---|---|
| 1. | "Nailu Nadi" | Ramajogayya Sastry | Sid Sriram, Kalyani Nair | 4:07 |
| 2. | "Who Where Why" | Roll Rida | Roll Rida | 3:33 |
| 3. | "Kannulu Chedire" | Ananta Sriram | Yazin Nizar | 3:45 |
| 4. | "WWW Theme" | | Shivi Saron | 2:15 |
| Total length: | | | | 13:40 |

== Reception ==
Calling it an "engaging tale," Prakash Pecheti of Telangana Today wrote: "KV Guhan, who made his mark with his debut flick 118, yet again shows his skill as a storyteller with a screenplay that is taut." Praising the performances, reviewer from Sakshi Post said: "Arun Adith steals the show with his stellar performance in the film. Shivani Rajasekhar's charm lies in her innocent appearance and her impeccable performance which makes the film an endearing watch." The Times of India critic Thadhagath Pathi rated the film 2.5/5 and wrote, "WWW tries to be fresh in its attempt but it’s a major let-down. Director KV Guhan could’ve pulled off this one better."

Aithagoni Raju of Asianet News Network appreciated the novel attempt by Guhan but opined that the screenplay and pacing could've been better. A critic writing for Eenadu opined that barring a few good sequences, the film failed to impress. On contrary, News18 Telugu's Kiran Kumar Thanjavur praised the film, direction and performances, calling it a "must-watch."
