= Power (2014 Kannada film) =

2014 film by K. Madesh

Power***
- Theatrical release poster
- Directed by: K. Madesh
- Written by: M. S. Ramesh
- Screenplay by: Srinu Vaitla; K. Madesh
- Story by: Gopimohan; Kona Venkat
- Based on: Dookudu by Srinu Vaitla
- Produced by: Ram Achanta; Gopichand Achanta; Anil Sunkara
- Starring: Puneeth Rajkumar; Trisha
- Cinematography: A. V. Krishna Kumar
- Edited by: Deepu S. Kumar
- Music by: S. S. Thaman
- Production companies: 14 Reels Entertainment; Kolla Entertainment
- Release date: 28 August 2014
- Running time: 173 minutes
- Country: India
- Language: Kannada
- Box office: est. ₹22 crore

Power (stylised as Power***) is a 2014 Indian Kannada-language action comedy film directed by K. Madesh and features Puneeth Rajkumar and Trisha in lead roles, alongside Kelly Dorjee, Prabhu, Rangayana Raghu and Sadhu Kokila in supporting roles. It is a remake of the 2011 Telugu film Dookudu which itself was inspired by the 2003 German tragicomedy film Good Bye, Lenin!. The film marked music director, S. Thaman's official musical entry to the Kannada film industry as well as Trisha's.

The story revolves around Bharath Kumar (Puneeth), a police officer who’s pursuing underworld don Naik (Kelly), who operates from Spain and Mumbai. Naik and his henchmen had tried to kill Bharath’s father Krishna Prasad (Prabhu), an honest MLA and a staunch follower of late actor Rajkumar. Circumstances force Bharath to act as an MLA, a reality show director and a cop, three roles which he portrays with finesse. While in Spain, Bharath falls in love with Prashanthi (Trisha). But how he plans to eliminate Naik and company forms the mainstay of the plot.

== Plot ==
Krishna is a politician driven by idealistic values and a sense of social service. His followers are his brother Sathya, and supporters. The people of Krishnanna's constituency elect him as a legislator. Krishna, an ardent follower of Dr. Rajkumar, establishes his own independent political empire, consensus with ideals proposed by Rajkumar. Krishna Prasad's dream is to see his son as a politician revered by people. During this time, he meets with a fatal accident, in which his brother and his followers are also killed.

14 years later, Krishna's son Bharath becomes a daring super-cop in Mumbai. He is on a mission to apprehend mafia don Nayak, who is involved in illegal drug trade, extortion and arms trafficking. It is later revealed that Krishna actually survived the accident and is comatose. However, this truth is hidden by Krishna's family from the people. Bharath maintains a low profile to apprehend Nayak. In an undercover operation in Spain, Bharath gets hold of Nayak's brother, Bablu. Later, it is revealed that corrupt opposition leader, who is also aiding Nayak, was the mastermind behind Krishna Prasad's accident, and had planned to derail Krishna's political empire as he was opposing his illegal businesses and relation with Nayak.

Bharath falls in love with Prashanti, whom he meets in Spain during his operation. Prashanti is the daughter of Bharath's higher officer, a cop who reports to the police commissioner in Bangalore city. When Bharath's dad comes out of the coma, doctors advise his family that Krishna is at risk if he encounters or hears anything upsetting, disturbing or shocking. Bharath hides the events surrounding his dad's accident & shifts his family to his dad's previously abandoned mansion, which is now being used for film making.

Bharath creates a dummy political set-up at this mansion. In the guise of a reality television program, Bharath tricks an aspiring but unsuccessful film actor P. Vibhushan, by making him believe that the television show is being sponsored by film star V. Ravichandran, and that Ravichandran wants to offer P. Vibhushan a very handsome remuneration for his realistic performance in the show. On the other hand, an aspiring actor Kamangi Kidney is also tricked by Bharath. Bharath also tricks Gouda with a real estate business deal, to exploit his criminal nexus. Bharath hides this drama from Krishna, by making Krishna believe that Bharath is now an M.L.A., revered by people fulfilling his dad's wishes. He also marries his love, Prashanti, to make his father happy. The rest of the plot reveals the politician-criminal nexus behind Krishna's accident, the comic misadventures which lead to Krishna learning the truth, and Bharath's retaliation over Nayak and Rudresh's political corruption.

== Cast ==
- Puneeth Rajkumar as Bharat Kumar IPS
- Trisha as Prashanti, Bharat's wife
- Prabhu as Krishna Prasad
- Kelly Dorjee as Nayak
- Rangayana Raghu as P V Bhushan
- Sadhu Kokila as Kidney Kamangi
- Sharath Lohitashwa as Minister Lambu Narasimha, Nayak's supporter
- Avinash as Chandram, Bharath's Higher Officer and Prasanthi's father
- Jai Jagadish as Bharath's uncle
- Shobaraj as Shivaiah
- Doddanna as Mallesh, Opposition Party Leader
- Shashikumar as Police Commissioner
- Adi Lokesh as Nayak's henchman
- Thilak Shekar as Nayak's henchman
- Tennis Krishna as Cool
- Hema as Prashanti's mother
- Chitra Shenoy
- Harsha
- Mohan Juneja as Mohana
- Harish Raj as Shastri
- Om Prakash Rao
- Bank Janardhan
- Mandya Ramesh
- Sundar Raj
- Danny Kuttappa as Rudrappa
- Vinod Alva as New Commissioner
- Neetu Chandra in item number "Why Why (Y Y)"

== Production ==
The film, launched in December 2013, is the first Kannada production of the Telugu company 14 Reels Entertainment. It is a remake of Telugu film Dookudu. Tamil actress Trisha made her debut into Sandalwood by starring opposite Puneeth Rajkumar.

There were some troubles related with the titles of the movie. Initially, the film was named Rajakumara, later Puneeth revealed the name as Ashwathama, which was then changed to Power. However, the name was already registered with KFCC, as it went to court. Finally it was changed to Power***.

== Soundtrack ==
Power

Soundtrack album by S. Thaman
- Released: 29 June 2014
- Recorded: 2014
- Genre: Film soundtrack
- Label: Lahari Music
- Producer: S. Thaman

S. Thaman chronology
Kandireega (2011)	Power (2014)	Osthe (2011)
External audio
- Official Audio Jukebox on YouTube

The soundtrack of the film was composed by S. Thaman, who earlier composed for the original, and released through Lahari Music label on 28 June 2014. The album consists of five songs. The audio launch of the movie took place at the Bellary Municipal grounds on 29 June 2014 with the presence of Telugu actor Mahesh Babu, who played the lead role in Dookudu.

Track listing
No.	Title	Lyrics	Singer(s)	Length
1.	"Dham Power"	Chandan Shetty	Ranjith, Nivas, Yazin Nizar, Chandan
2.	"Guruvara Sanje"	Kaviraj	Puneeth Rajkumar
3.	"Mehabooba Mehabooba"	V. Nagendra Prasad	Suchith Suresan, Priya Raghavan
4.	"Jagatthe Namadhu"	V. Nagendra Prasad	Nakul Abhayankar, Santhosh, Anuradha Bhat, Sneha Ravindran
5.	"Why Why (YY)"	V. Nagendra Prasad	M. M. Manasi, Naveen Madhav

== Release ==
The film released 28 August 2014 in 275+ screens including 116 screens in Bangalore alone. The film got 'U/A' certificate with few mutes censor board.

=== Critical reception ===
The film received positive reviews from critics as well as audience alike. Sify stated "With a star-cast this huge and a good technical crew a neat screenplay is expected and this is where the director could have worked on. In spite of being a Telugu remake, director K. Madesh could have put some effort to make it? more local?. Unfortunately director has failed to do the same. Yet, Power Star is definitely worth a watch!" Indiaglitz rated 3.25/5 stated There is no reason for you to miss this film. Desimartini rated 3.5/5 stated Puneeth Rajkumar's powerful performance and Trisha's refreshing screen presence make Power*** an entertaining watch. Though confusing at times, the humor, action and music make the film worth your while. Chitraloka.com rated 3.5/5 stated Another first timer in the film is Kelly Dorjee. He plays the main villain and is a perfect cast. He is menacing and matches Puneeth's heroism with his bad man act. Shivaji Prabhu has become a regular in Kannada films and it is good to see him in such weighty roles. Power*** is the perfect gift for the Ganesha festival you can give yourself and your friends and family. It is a great film to watch in a group.

=== Box office ===
The film opened to packed houses and collected around ₹28 million (US$290,000) in its first day which is the biggest opening for any Kannada film followed by Maanikya, Bhajarangi, and Ninnindale. The film made a remarkable business during first weekend while it grossed around ₹82 million (US$850,000) which is the biggest opening weekend for any Kannada movie followed by Sudeep's Maanikya which grossed around ₹74 million (US$770,000). The film is the first Kannada film to cross ₹22 crore (US$2.3 million)in just 6 days which broke the record of Maanikya.

Officially, the film made Rs 11,02,91,429 in the first 15 days of its release. This, however, excluded the figures for the four districts of the Gulbarga region, for which data was unavailable. The film made more than Rs 8 crore in the first week and expectedly the Bangalore, Mysore, Hubli regions and multiplexes contributed nearly 90 per cent of the revenues. This had become the new benchmark. Trade trackers noted that it was a decent benchmark, considering the smaller market Sandalwood is.

The film had a theatrical run of 100 days in centers across Karnataka.
