= In R Voice =

Russian musician

In'R'Voice
- Also known as: Denny De Kay
- Born: Denis Kozlov
- Origin: Moscow, Russia
- Genres: EDM, trance, progressive, techno, tech house, ambient, psybient, downtempo, electronica

In'R'Voice (birth name Denis Kozlov, Russian: Денис Козлов) is an electronic musician from Moscow, Russia.

== History ==
In the late 1980s, he was a fan of the classic industrial bands like Skinny Puppy, Front 242 and Nitzer Ebb. Driven by the innovative sound of industrial music, Kozlov began to experiment with analogue synthesizers. In 1992, he recorded his first tracks on a Studio “Tandem”, which recorded mainly pop musicians, but had very enthusiastic sound engineers. Together they developed the sound of Kozlov's project Inner Resonance Voice. In 1994, In’R’Voice became hugely popular on Moscow's main radio station Maximum and in nightclubs. A year later he received an award for innovations in music from the Ministry of Culture of Russia.

In 1996, Kozlov visited London, and attained early trance music events held by Transient Records (Otherworld Party) and by the label Return To The Source in a Fridge Club and the party label “Pagan” by Tsuoshi Suzuki (Matsury Productions). He recorded collaboration tracks with Tim Healey and Seb Taylor. Kozlov helped to organise concerts in Moscow for the leading trance projects including Shakta, Slide, Quirk, DJ's Baraka, John Phantasm, Mike McGuire (Juno Reactor), and Chris Organic.

In 1999, Kozlov relocated to London, and played alongside James Monro, Blue Planet Corporation, Tim Schuldt, Infected Mushroom, Bumbling Loons, Shakta, Hux Flux and many more. The first full album on Optica Records In’R’Voice, Resonance Metaphizix, was mastered at the Abbey Road Studios in London.

After 2004, Kozlov began to experiment with other styles of music, and recorded “Digital Shamanism” on London's Optica Records, “The Scent of Russian Dreams” on Sphere Records and “Do You Sea What I See” on System Recordings in the US. In 2008, Kozlov founded his own multigenre EDM record label, Kissthesound Records (kissthesound.com), and in 2013 Tech-House label Axiomatic Records (axiomatic-records.com), aiming to release young talented musicians from Russia and Europe producing different trends of music.

Kozlov has released his music under many project names such as Den Kozlov, Peace Data, Decay Axiomatic, Emotion Code, Karmahacker, Technokitsch, Dive Craft, Shagging Harmonies, T.E.C.H.O., Record Needle Injection, X-Television, Pixelliadians, Psy-Phi Generation, Babnick Enemy, Krolex, S.H.L.I., X-Alt Project, Slake Philter, Overtone Epidemic, Slick Tweak, Levitating Cat, Love In Decay, Eastern Promises, See You Later Oscillator, and Moot.

== Discography ==
=== Digital albums ===
- IN’R’VOICE – Telekinesis (Electro-Breaks Version) (The Urban Sound Records 2005 / UK)
- IN’R’VOICE – Bittersweet (Kissthesound Records 2009 / UK)
- IN’R’VOICE – Magnetic (Kissthesound Records 2010 / UK)
- IN’R’VOICE - Futurepast (Kissthesound Records 2012 / UK)
- IN’R’VOICE - Magnetic Future | B-Sides, Singles, Hits 1992-2012 (Kissthesound Records 2012 / UK)
- IN’R’VOICE – Disentangle (Kissthesound Records 2012 / UK)
- IN’R’VOICE - 1995 Infinity remixes (Kissthesound Records 2013 / UK)
- IN’R’VOICE - Reanitrance (Kissthesound Records 2014 / UK)
- PEACE DATA - Infected Washroom (Arkona Creation Records 2010 / UK)
- PEACE DATA - TranceSceneDental (Sun Station Records 2012 / RU)
- PEACE DATA - Some More Dark (Kissthesound Records 2013 / UK)
- KARMAHACKER – Share My Wings (The Urban Sound Records 2005 / UK)
- KARMAHACKER – Heartbreaker (Kissthesound Records 2010 / UK)
- EMOTION CODE – Mesmerise The Future (The Urban Sound Records 2005 / UK)
- EMOTION CODE - Triggers Of Imagination (The Urban Sound Records 2005 / UK)
- EMOTION CODE – Triggers Of Imagination (Kissthesound Records 2008 / UK)
- EMOTION CODE – Out Of The Blue (Kissthesound Records 2009 / UK)
- DEN KOZLOV – Inxinema (Kissthesound Records 2008 / UK)
- DEN KOZLOV – Digital Shamanism Extended Digital Edition (Kissthesound Records 2010 / UK)
- DEN KOZLOV – Galactic Pulse Music (Kissthesound Records 2010 / UK)
- DEN KOZLOV – Selected Digital Tapes | The Best Of Den Kozlov Downtempo Edition (Kissthesound Records 2012 / UK)
- DEN KOZLOV – Selected Digital Tapes | The Best Of Den Kozlov Breaks Edition (Kissthesound Records 2012 / UK)
- DEN KOZLOV – Selected Digital Tapes | The Best Of Den Kozlov House Edition (Kissthesound Records 2012 / UK)
- DEN KOZLOV ft S.Gavrilov - Do You Sea What I See (System Recordings 2010 / USA)
- DEN KOZLOV – Infrangible Duality (System Recordings 2011 / USA)
- DEN KOZLOV – Inexplicable Premonitions (System Recordings 2013 / USA)
- PSY-PHI GENERATION – Impact (Kissthesound Records / Cytopia 2007 / Holland)
- PIXELLIADIANS – Vortex (Kissthesound Records 2008 / UK)
- PIXELLIADIANS – All In One (Kissthesound Records 2011 / UK)
- T.E.C.H.O. – Oxitocin (Zenzontle Records 2011 / Canada)
- SEE YOU LATER OSCILLATOR – Amphigory (Kissthesound Records 2012 / UK)

=== CD albums ===
I* N’R’VOICE – Resonance Metaphizix 2CD (Sphere Records 2001 / UK)

- IN’R’VOICE – Inner Vision (re-issue) (Pink Room 1996 + Shum Records 2003 / RU)
- IN’R’VOICE – Outer Space (Shum Records 2004 / RU)
- IN’R’VOICE – Telekinesis (Shum Records 2005 / RU)
- IN’R’VOICE – The Scent Of Russian Dreams (Optica Records 2006 / UK)
- PEACE DATA – Peace Depth (Shum Records 2004 / RU)
- PEACE DATA – Infected Washroom (Arkona Creation 2010 / UK)
- DEN KOZLOV – Digital Shamanism 2CD (Optica Records 2004 / UK)
- DEN KOZLOV – Digital Shamanism 2CD (Shum Records 2004 / RU)
- KARMAHACKER – Bending The Reality (Shum Records 2005 / RU)
- S.H.L.I. – Shli Online (Shum Records 2006 / RU)
- EMOTION CODE – Infused With The Spiral (Shum Records 2005 / RU)

=== Digital compilations ===
- IN’R’VOICE vs AKADO – Oxymoron (Uber Trend Colour Psychedelic Purple / Kissthesound 2009)
- IN’R’VOICE - Human Recycle (Other Worlds vol.1 Downtempo / Kissthesound Records 2013 / UK)
- IN’R’VOICE - Deep Reach (Other Worlds vol.3 No Beat / Kissthesound Records 2014 / UK)
- RECORD NEEDLE INJECTION - Outstructured (Other Worlds vol.2 Broken Beat / Kissthesound Records 2014 / UK)
- DEN KOZLOV - The Universe Is A Spiral (Other Worlds vol.3 No Beat / Kissthesound Records 2014 / UK)
- DEN KOZLOV - On Hold (ZR 5th Anniversary / Zenzontle Records 2013 / Canada)
- DEN KOZLOV - Forest (Chill For A Winter Morning / System Recordings 2010 / USA)
- DEN KOZLOV ft S.Gavrilov - Lost In You (Celebrating 10 Years of Breaks / System Recordings 2011 / USA)
- DEN KOZLOV ft S.Gavrilov - Lost In You (These Are The Breaks / System Recordings 2010 / USA)
- DEN KOZLOV ft S.Gavrilov - We Change Forever (Rocktronica / System Recordings 2010 / USA)
- DEN KOZLOV ft S.Gavrilov - Confession (Chill For A Late Night / System Recordings 2010 / USA)
- DEN KOZLOV ft S.Gavrilov - Confession (Celebrating 10 Years Of Chill / System Recordings 2010 / USA)
- DENIS ALEXANDER – The Perfect Date (Bakkelit 2.1 / Spiral Trax Records 2008/ Germany)
- DEYA DOVA – Spaceman (Peace Data Remix) (Deya Dova Remixed / Reflekta Records 2011/ Australia)
- PEACE DATA – Nasty Things (We Play Trance Vol.1 / Paranoja Records 2009)
- PEACE DATA – Nasty Things (Sound Of Psy Trance Goa / Volt9 Records 2009)
- PEACE DATA – Kat Niet Eten Hersenen (9 Lives / Sangoma Records 2012 / Germany)
- PEACE DATA and E.C.T. – P-Funk P-Monk (Brain Screw Vol.2 / Parvati Records 2012 / Denmark)
- PEACE DATA and E.C.T. – What The Flac (Footprints Vol.2 / Parvati Records 2013 / Denmark)
- PEACE DATA - Magnet (Other Worlds vol.2 Broken Beat / Kissthesound Records 2014 / UK)
- EMOTION CODE – Push It Closer (Drum’N’Bass Vol.1 / Quebola Records 2010)
- EMOTION CODE – Push It Closer (UK Drum’N’Bass and Breakbeat Vol.2 / Quebola Records 2010)
- EMOTION CODE – Creating Out Of Chaos (Break The Beat Vol.1 / Vinyl Loops Records 2011)
- EMOTION CODE – Push It Closer (Break The Beat Vol.2 / Vinyl Loops Records 2011)
- EMOTION CODE – Creating Out Of Chaos (UK Drum’N’Bass and Breakbeat Vol.1 / Quebola Records 2011)
- EMOTION CODE - Seventeenth Shade Of Tone (Other Worlds vol.2 Broken Beat / Kissthesound Records 2014 / UK)
- S.H.L.I. – Solar Mission (Uber Trend Colour Psychedelic Purple / Kissthesound 2009)
- SLAKE PHILTER – L.B.F. (Uber Trend Electric Indigo / Kissthesound 2010)
- OVERTONE EPIDEMIC – Overkill (Glamour Underground Vol.1 / Kissthesound 2009)
- SLICK TWEAK – Stepping Up (Glamour Underground Vol.1 / Kissthesound 2009)
- KROLEX – Entering Yellowness (Glamour Underground Vol.1 / Kissthesound 2009)
- EASTERN PROMISES – Eastern Kiss (Glamour Underground Vol.3 / Kissthesound 2010)
- EMOTION CODE & HELSKANKI – Rush Hour (Kissthesound Of Electronica Vol.1 / Kissthesound 2010)
- DEN KOZLOV ft. INNESSA – Searching For Something (Glamour Underground Vol.4 / Kissthesound 2011)
- DECAY AXIOMATIC – X-Ray (Glamour Underground Vol.5 / Kissthesound 2012)
- VIRTUAL MODE – Alone (Den Kozlov Remix) (Kissthesound Of Electronica Vol.2 / Kissthesound 2012)
- DENNY DE KAY - Sophia (Nimbus Formation Remix) (Other Worlds vol.2 Broken Beat / Kissthesound Records 2014 / UK)

=== CD compilations ===
- IN’R’VOICE – Ne Voules Vous Pas... (Object#1 / R.M.G. 1997 / RU)
- IN’R’VOICE AND SHAKTA – Present Moment (Distance to Goa 9 / Distance Records 2000 / EU)
- IN’R’VOICE ft. LOA – Temple-Works (Orbis / Sphere Records 2000 / UK)
- IN’R’VOICE – Resonance (Atom Smasher / Optica Records 2000 / UK)
- IN’R’VOICE – Breakthrough (Chapel Perlios / Kukomi Records 2000 / UK)
- IN’R’VOICE vs DARK SOHO – Depth Of Emotion (Orbis II / Sphere Records 2001 / UK)
- IN’R’VOICE – Space Boot (Psychoaneasis / Sphere Records 2001 / UK)
- IN’R’VOICE vs MUMIY TROLL – Shesasinger (Electronic Children / Bamba Records 2000 / Germany)
- IN’R’VOICE vs MUMIY TROLL – Sheisasinger (Моя Певица | Другие Места / Real Records 2000 / RU)
- IN’R’VOICE – Esoteric 013 (Trance Psychedelic Flashbacks 5 / Rumour Records 2002 / UK)
- IN’R’VOICE and SHAKTA (Feed The Flame by Shakta / Dragonfly Records 2004 / UK)
- IN’R’VOICE – Killaherts (Goa Vol15 / Yellow Sunshine Explosion 2006 / UK)
- KARMAHACKER – Meditation (Trance Destiny / Passion Music 2002 / UK)
- KARMAHACKER – I Know U Somewhere (Trance Psychedelic Flashbacks 5 / Rumour Records 2002 / UK)
- KARMAHACKER – Shaman's Trip To Outland (Chill@The Global Cafe / Rumour Records 2002 / UK)
- PEACE DATA – Peace Depth (Eskimo / Resonoise Records 2000 / UK)
- PEACE DATA – Manda(la) (Natural Selection Vol.2 / Shum Records 2004 / RU)
- PEACE DATA – Kat Niet Eten Hersenen (9 Lives / Sangoma Records 2012 / Germany)
- PEACE DATA and E.C.T. – P-Funk P-Monk (Brain Screw Vol.2 / Parvati Records 2012 / Denmark)
- PEACE DATA and E.C.T. – What The Flac (Footprints Vol.2 / Parvati Records 2013 / Denmark)
- S.H.L.I. (IN’R’VOICE & LOA) – I Am The Master (Atom Smasher / Optica Records 2000 / UK)

=== Digital EPs ===
- IN’R’VOICE ft. SEONE – Bass From Outer Space E.P. (Kissthesound / Cytopia 2008 / Holland)
- IN’R’VOICE – The Time Shifter E.P. (Inevitable Records 2008 / UK)
- IN’R’VOICE – Magnetic Remixes (Kissthesound Records 2010 / UK)
- IN’R’VOICE – Sea Is My Blood Remixes (Kissthesound Records 2010 / UK)
- PEACE DATA – Paper Happiness E.P. (Kissthesound Records 2010 / UK)
- PEACE DATA – Peace Of Paper (Kissthesound Records 2012 / UK)
- DEN KOZLOV – Guarding Your Sleep Remixes (Kissthesound Records 2010 / UK)
- DEN KOZLOV – Emotions (Kissthesound Records 2011 / UK)
- DENNY DE CAY & SAMANTHA FARRELL - Love And Decay (Axiomatic Records 2013 / RU)
- TECHNOKITCSH - Body Language (Axiomatic Records 2013 / RU)
- T.E.C.H.O. – Love Candy E.P. (Kissthesound Records 2011 / UK)
- T.E.C.H.O. – Sophia E.P. (Kissthesound Records 2012 / UK)
- DIVE CRAFT - Deeper House (Axiomatic Records 2013 / RU)
- DIVE CRAFT - Telepathy (Axiomatic Records 2013 / RU)
- SHAGGING HARMONIES – Blades E.P. (Kissthesound Records / UK)
- X-TELEVISION – Kiss Ya Later E.P. (Kissthesound Records 2008 / UK)
- S.H.L.I. – I Am The Master E.P. (Kissthesound / Cytopia 2008 / Holland)
- LEVITATING CAT – Flying Single E.P. (Kissthesound Records 2009 / UK)
- LEVITATING CAT - Sand Stomp (Axiomatic Records 2013 / RU)
- RECORD NEEDLE INJECTION – Mirror Saw E.P. (Kissthesound Records 2010 / UK)
- LOVE AND DECAY ft.INNESSA – Dancefloor Is My Playground (Kissthesound Records 2011 / UK)
- KARMAHACKER – Back To Nature Wasted E.P. (Kissthesound Records 2012 / UK)
- MOOT – Unununium E.P. (Kissthesound Records 2013 / UK)
- DECAY AXIOMATIC – Amazonka Closed Her Eyes E.P. (Kissthesound Records 2012 / UK)
- DECAY AXIOMATIC – Hydrogender E.P. (Kissthesound Records 2013 / UK)
- DECAY AXIOMATIC - Sublime (Axiomatic Records 2013 / RU)

=== Compact cassettes ===
- INNER VOICE - Morpheus (Pink Room 1992 / RU) |not official
- INNER VOICE - Everything Made Of Plastic (Pink Room 1992 / RU)|not official
- INNER VOICE - Trinitrotoluol (Pink Room 1993 / RU) |not official
- IN’R’VOICE - In The Middle Of Nowhere (Pink Room 1995 / RU) | not official
- IN’R’VOICE – Inner Vision (Pink Room 1996 / RU) | not official
- IN’R’VOICE – Reason Nation (Pink Room 1997 / RU) | not official
- IN’R’VOICE – Jai Jayati Jai (Compilation First Vision / Sun Trance 1998 / RU)

=== Vinyl records ===
- IN’R’VOICE - Crying Universe (Fractal – Kin Records 1999 / UK)
- IN’R’VOICE AND SHAKTA – Present Moment (Return To The Source 2000 / UK)
- IN’R’VOICE – Space Boot (Psychoaneasis E.P. / Sphere Records 2001 / UK)
