= MLA (2018 Telugu film) =

2018 action film by Upendra Madhav

MLA (Manchi Lakshanalunna Abbayi)
- Official poster
- Directed by: Upendra Madhav
- Written by: Upendra Madhav
- Produced by: Kiran Reddy; Bharath Chowdary; T. G. Vishwa Prasad; Vivek Kuchibotla
- Starring: Nandamuri Kalyan Ram; Kajal Aggarwal; Ravi Kishan
- Cinematography: Prasad Murella
- Edited by: Tammiraju
- Music by: Mani Sharma
- Production companies: Blue Planet Entertainments LLP; People Media Factory
- Distributed by: Blue Planet Entertainments
- Release date: 23 March 2018
- Running time: 129 minutes
- Country: India
- Language: Telugu
- Box office: est. ₹17.5 crore

Manchi Lakshanalunna Abbayi (transl. A boy with good qualities), also known as MLA, is a 2018 Indian Telugu-language romantic action film written and directed by Upendra Madhav who earlier worked as a writer for films such as Bruce Lee and Aagadu. Starring Nandamuri Kalyan Ram, Kajal Aggarwal and Ravi Kishan in the lead roles, it was produced by Kiran Reddy, Bharath Chowdary, TG Viswa Prasad, and Vivek Kuchibhotla under Blue Planet Entertainments banner, their second venture after Nene Raju Nene Mantri. In the film, a young man must become an MLA and defeat a corrupt politician in order to marry the woman he loves.

The film was released on 23 March 2018.

== Plot ==
Gadappa is a corrupt politician who has been resorting to dirty tricks in order to win. When he again wins the elections, and the village landlord's son loses, he proceeds to kill the reporter who was about to expose him to the general public.

Kalyan is a young man who gets a job at his brother in law's office and falls for Indu, his chairman's daughter, upon seeing her good qualities and tries to convince her to reciprocate, but she doesn't. One day, when Marthaali, a local goon and his henchmen, beat up his company's employees and snatch their land, Kalyan accepts the challenge to bring back the stolen land in exchange for reciprocation from Indu. Kalyan and his team bring Pattabhi, a cunning lawyer, to support them in court. Knowing that Marthaali and his wife love each other deeply, Kalyan and Indu act like a couple and film everything, later replacing the background with Marthaali's house using chroma key. A legal notice is sent, due to which Marthaali and his wife go to the court, where the fabricated footage shown by Kalyan proves him and Indu to be the owners. However, Marthaali accepts he forcefully took away Kalyan's company's land, causing Pattabhi to close the case and send Marthaali to jail.

Indu privately meets Kalyan and thanks to him but also tells him that due to her background, they won't be able to live together. Kalyan apologizes instead for chasing her all the time and confesses his love for her, before getting attacked by goons who try to kidnap Indu. Kalyan gets up and fights them all using improvised weapons. After beating down the final goon, he tells him to go and inform Marthaali he's not going to let him get away with this, before the goon reveals he doesn't know any Marthaali and that Indu isn't the chairman's daughter. She reveals she swapped her post with the chairman's daughter because her father, the landlord whose son lost, was forcing her to marry Gadappa for political power. She finally reciprocates, following which Kalyan takes her back to her village and patiently explains the value of parents and his love for Indu, which impresses her family. However, her father challenges him to become an MLA and defeat Gadappa in the upcoming elections.

Kalyan accepts the challenge and is joined by Gadappa's ex-PA, who was loyal but fired for making a small mistake. They team up and introduce a lot of reforms, but that doesn't convince the public. Kalyan tricks Gadappa's new PA into believing he knows what the public wants instead of water, due to which Gadappa sends a truck full of alcohol for the men. The men drink and hit their wives, due to which Kalyan decides to help them and wins their support. However, a child worker dies from the chemical infection in a glass bottle factory, causing an enraged Kalyan to fight Gadappa's goons, free all the children and blackmail Gadappa into giving him 60 lakh rupees for educating the children, using the slain reporter's pen drive containing the evidence. He emotionally convinces the parents to stop sending their kids to factories and instead to schools. The school, too, is attacked, but Kalyan encourages everyone to fight back and eventually wins their support.

Soon, Kalyan is attacked on a bridge and left severely wounded, following which he is admitted to the hospital. He is saved, but Gadappa threatens to destroy everyone's lives by all dirty means possible. In order to save them, he instructs Kalyan to destroy his reputation with his own hands in front of the public. Kalyan lies that he was doing all the service for money and his girlfriend, further asking everyone not to vote for him. The next day, the voting begins, and Kalyan starts getting higher votes, due to which Gadappa's henchmen try to attack the polling booth. He himself decides to come there, and on the way, is attacked by numerous schoolkids who throw stones at him. They are joined by Kalyan, who, again using improvised weapons, manages to fight and defeat Gadappa. The police arrive, and having seen all the evidence against him given to them by Kalyan's PA, arrest Gadappa. Kalyan wins the elections, and the public reveals he did a lot for them, and thus they made him win. Kalyan marries Indu, whose father gives up the lust for power and instead values public love.

== Cast ==
- Nandamuri Kalyan Ram as Kalyan Chaturvedi
- Kajal Aggarwal as Indu
- Ravi Kishan as MLA Gadappa
- Jaya Prakash Reddy as Nagappa, Indu's father
- Murali Mohan as Chairman
- Brahmanandam as Pattabhi
- Posani Krishna Murali as Chantti, the CEO
- Manali Rathod as Smitha, Chairman's Daughter
- Vennela Kishore as Prasad, Kalyan’s brother In-law
- Anchor Lasya as Kalyan's sister
- Ravi Prakash as Indu's brother
- Prudhviraj as Kalyan's PA
- Prabhas Sreenu as Gadappa's PA
- Ajay as Marthaali
- Sivaji Raja as a village member
- Appaji Ambarisha Darbha as Politician
- M. Sasikumar as himself
- Samuthirakani as himself

== Reception ==
=== Box office ===
MLA had a successful opening day at the Indian box office, the best of Nandamuri Kalyan Ram's career. It also had a successful US debut; opening at 200 movie theatres.

== Soundtrack ==
The music was composed by Mani Sharma and released by Aditya Music.

MLA

Soundtrack album by Mani Sharma
- Released: 20 March 2018
- Recorded: 2018
- Venue: Hyderabad
- Genre: Soundtrack
- Length: 18:02
- Label: Aditya Music
- Producer: Mani Sharma

Mani Sharma chronology
| Okka Kshanam (2017) | MLA (2018) | Ee Maya Peremito (2018) |

Track list
| No. | Title | Lyrics | Singer(s) | Length |
|---|---|---|---|---|
| 1. | "Most Wanted Abbayi" | Ramajogayya Sastry | Yazin Nizar, Ramya Behara | 4:34 |
| 2. | "Hey Indu" | Kasarla Shyam | Rahul Sipligunj | 3:52 |
| 3. | "Girl Friend" | Ramajogayya Sastry | Anurag Kulkarni | 3:47 |
| 4. | "Yuddam Yuddam" | Ramajogayya Sastry | Anurag Kulkarni | 5:49 |
| Total length: | | | | 18:02 |
