= Prasad Murella =

Indian cinematographer

- Born: Vijayawada, Andhra Pradesh, India
- Occupation: Director of Photography
- Years active: 2000–present

Prasad Murella is an Indian cinematographer who predominantly works in Telugu cinema. He debut film was Azhagana Naatkal in Tamil.

== Personal life ==
He was born in Vijayawada where he completed his schooling and his higher studies. Due to his passion for films, he travelled to Chennai and assisted many cinematographers, such as Ravi Yadav and D. Shanker.

== Career ==
He started his career with the Tamil film Azhagana Naatkal directed by Sundar C in 2000. Later he made his debut in Telugu with the film Venky, directed by Srinu Vaitla in 2004, and shot another film called Chanti in the same year. He went back to Tamil films in 2004 with Devathayai Kanden and was there until the year 2006 working for the films Chinna and Rendu.

In 2007, he started shooting Telugu films with the film Dhee and has remained in this film industry. He was awarded with the 2010 Nandi Award for Best Cinematographer for the film Namo Venkatesa. It is an award given by Andhra Pradesh state government. He also won the SIIMA Award for Best Cinematographer (Telugu) for the 2013 film Attharintiki Daaredhi

== Filmography ==
- All films in Telugu unless otherwise noted

Year	Film	Notes
2001	Azhagana Naatkal	Tamil
2003	Winner	Tamil
2004	Venky	
2004	Chanti	
2004	Devathayai Kanden	Tamil
2005	Chinna	Tamil
2006	Rendu	Tamil
2007	Dhee	
2007	Raju Bhai	
2007	Chandamama	
2008	Ready	
2008	King	
2010	Namo Venkatesa	Nandi Award for Best Cinematographer
2010	Simha	Additional cinematography
2011	Dookudu	
2012	Poola Rangadu	
2013	Shadow	
2013	Attharintiki Daaredhi	SIIMA Award for Best Cinematographer (Telugu)
2015	S/O Satyamurthy	
2015	Soukhyam	
2017	Katamarayudu	
2018	MLA	
2018	Pantham	
2019	Venky Mama	
2021	Tuck Jagadish	
2022	Macherla Niyojakavargam	
2023	Ravanasura	2 songs and Additional cinematography
2023	Aadikeshava	Additional cinematography
2024	Devaki Nandana Vasudeva	
2025	Arjun Son of Vyjayanthi	Additional cinematography
2026	Bhartha Mahasayulaku Wignyapthi	

== See also ==
- Indian cinematographers
