= Kandulapalem =

- village
- Interactive map of Kandulapalem
- Location in Andhra Pradesh, India Kandulapalem (India)
- Coordinates: 16°49′06″N 82°05′04″E
- Country: India
- State: Andhra Pradesh
- District: Konaseema
- Elevation: 10 m (33 ft)

Population (2001)
  - Total: 2,277

Languages
  - Official: Telugu
- Time zone: UTC+5:30 (IST)
- PIN: 533 262
- Telephone code: 91–8857
- Vehicle registration: AP

Kandulapalem or Kandula Palem is a village located in Ramachandrapuram mandal in East Godavari district of Andhra Pradesh, India.
