= 118 (film) =

- Theatrical release poster
- Directed by: K. V. Guhan
- Written by: K. V. Guhan
- Screenplay by: K. V. Guhan
- Produced by: Mahesh S. Koneru
- Starring: Nandamuri Kalyan Ram; Shalini Pandey; Nivetha Thomas
- Cinematography: K. V. Guhan
- Edited by: Tammiraju
- Music by: Shekar Chandra
- Production company: East Coast Production
- Release date: 1 March 2019
- Running time: 126 minutes
- Country: India
- Language: Telugu
- Budget: ₹12 crore
- Box office: est. ₹17–20.8 crore

118 is a 2019 Indian action thriller film written and directed by cinematographer turned film director K. V. Guhan in his Telugu directorial debut. The film features Kalyan Ram, Shalini Pandey and Nivetha Thomas in the lead roles. The music for the film is composed by Shekar Chandra, and the film is produced by Mahesh S. Koneru under the production company East Coast Production. The film follows an investigative journalist who finds himself threatened after he tries to decode a recurring nightmare involving a woman's death.

The film released on 1 March 2019. It received generally positive reviews from critics and became a commercial success.

== Plot ==
While sleeping in room number 118 of the Paradise resort, Gowtham dreams about a girl getting beaten and a car being thrown into a lake. Six months later, he is revealed to be an investigative journalist who stops a money laundering operation by fighting off the home minister's brother and his goons while filming everything. The minister is exposed, and Gowtham is invited to a night party at the same resort where he sleeps in room 118 again. When the dream recurs, he visits a psychiatrist named Dr. Athmaram Divakar, who advises him not to take the dream seriously. Soon, a car chase with the home minister's henchmen takes Gowtham to a road he saw in his dreams. Jumping into the nearby lake, he discovers an empty car belonging to a church. The Church Father, Francis, tells Gowtham it was driven by a woman named Esther. A strange gate symbol leads Gowtham to a shut-down printing press where he discovers missing posters of the girl in his dreams, Aadhya. He later realizes that Aadhya went missing and his dream appeared on full moon days. Believing the visitors during the other six full moon days to have had the same dream, he sets out to contact them but is contacted by Aadhya, who tells him not to look for her. He uses police help to trace the phone number and chases a van containing the phone but finds it belonging to none. Some hints from the visitors lead him to a photo of Aadhya and a girl from Venkataramana Public School whose employee named Murthy is murdered while on his way to help Gowtham.

Gowtham visits the office of Sai Videos office, who filmed an event at the resort, and in the footage sees Aadhya with a man who is soon kidnapped by some goons and a chase ensues, resulting in his death. Gowtham then goes to meet Francis and identifies a nun as the woman who contacted him as Aadhya. She then reveals that Francis told her to make the call and even lied about Esther to Gowtham. He then heads for Vizag to meet Francis, following which the nun is killed. Esther is revealed to be the daughter of Francis, who is then shot by the goons. A fight ensues, resulting in Gowtham escaping with Esther, who then tells him that Aadhya was a friendly computer science teacher who showed affection on Prabhavathi, a young student who died after a vaccination in the school. Aadhya tried to investigate and came to know about illegal vaccinations run by Alanta company. Aadhya and Esther went to the Paradise resort to meet a friend for help, but had to part ways because of a phone call that told Esther that her friend met with an accident. Upon finding Aadhya missing and goons looking for her, Esther had to run away.

Gowtham visits Athmaram, who claims to make humans enter the world of dreams and decides to use his technology after a successful trial. Gowtham, his fiancée Megha, and assistant Ramesh are on their way to the resort but get attacked by the same goons and a car chase ensues, resulting in a fight that leaves Gowtham injured. Asking both Megha and Ramesh to not enter until he voluntarily comes out, he injects himself with the drug given by Athmaram and sleeps. He enters the dream within his mind and realizes that he was the one supposed to help Aadhya but could not as he too had to leave upon learning about the accident of his and Esther's common friend Siddharth. He then watches Aadhya being taken to room 118 where she meets the CEO and owner of Alanta Company V. N. Shah. His henchmen have all the evidence snatched from her and destroyed. She is brutally killed and buried near a fountain in the same resort. Gowtham upon waking up gets the spot where she is buried excavated with the help of police team and obtains a bracelet from her skeletal remains, which has a USB drive containing Aadhya's final video message along with the evidence that she had collected thus far against the company (thus, the evidence destroyed by Shah's henchmen was only a copy that she had brought to show Gowtham whom she was to meet that evening during the event at resort). The culprits are captured, Gowtham is praised by the media, and Shah shoots himself. Later at his house that night Gowtham has a bright dream in which Aadhya appears with a smile, indicating that her soul is now at peace. He wakes up to find her presence of vision disappeared.

== Cast ==
- Nandamuri Kalyan Ram as Gowtham
- Shalini Pandey as Megha
- Nivetha Thomas as Aadhya
- Nassar as Dr. Athmaram Divakar
- Habib Al-Aidroos as V. N. Shah
- Mahesh Achanta
- C. V. L. Narasimha Rao
- Harshavardhan
- Rajeev Kanakala as Ravinder
- Subbaraju as Saketh
- Supreeth as Sudheer
- Sivannarayana as Receptionist
- Bharath Reddy as Police Officer K. Ravindra
- Prabhas Sreenu as Ramesh
- Hari Teja as Esther
- Chammak Chandra as Pandu
- Viren Thambidurai as Father Francis
- Geetha Bhascker as Goutham's mother
- Sandhya Janak as Megha's mother
- Kedar Shankar as Megha's father
- Reavthinath
- Ashok Kumar
- Mukhtar Khan as Ashok
- Mirchi Kiran as Prasad
- Ashok Kumar as Murthy
- Paata Uttej as Prabhavathi
- Rajasekhar Aningi as Devaraj
- Deekshitulu as Velayudham
- Gagan Vihari as Rony
- Meena Vasu as Nun
- Sravan as Hitman
- Vajja Venkata Giridhar

== Production ==
The film marks the directorial debut for cinematographer K. V. Guhan in the Telugu film industry who also marks his return to directorial after previously directing a 2010 Tamil-language film titled Inidhu Inidhu, which was the remake of the 2007 blockbuster Telugu film Happy Days. The filming began around May 2018, and the first look poster of the film was unveiled on 5 July 2018 on the occasion of lead actor Kalyan Ram's birthday.

== Release ==
118 was released to theatres on 1 March 2019, following the wrap up of post production work which concluded in around February 2019.

== Soundtrack ==
118

Soundtrack album by Shekar Chandra
- Released: 26 February 2019
- Recorded: 2019
- Genre: Soundtrack
- Length: 8:11
- Label: Aditya Music
- Producer: Shekar Chandra

Shekar Chandra chronology
| Subrahmanyapuram (2018) | 118 (2019) | Savaari (2020) |

Music composed by Shekar Chandra. Music released on Aditya Music The soundtrack consists of three songs which was released on 26 February 2019.

Track list
| No. | Title | Lyrics | Singer(s) | Length |
|---|---|---|---|---|
| 1. | "Chandamame" | Ramanjaneyulu, Krishna Chaitanya | Yazin Nizar, Hemachandra | 3:41 |
| 2. | "Paadhaalu Nee Dhari" | Kalyan Tripuraneni | Nutana Mohan | 2:24 |
| 3. | "118 Theme" | | Instrumental | 2:06 |
| Total length: | | | | 8:11 |

== Reception ==
Neeshita Nyayapati of Times of India gave 3.5/5 stating "Just don't try to dig too deep or you might miss out on a fine thriller".

Manoj Kumar R of Indianexpress gave 2/5 stating "KV Guhan's film is rife with unoriginal ideas that it becomes very difficult for the audience to forgive and just focus on the story".

Hemanth Kumar of Firstpost gave 2.5/5 stating "Kalyan Ram goes on a wild goose chase to find the plot of KV Guhan's thriller".
