= K. V. Guhan =

Indian cinematographer

- Born: Coimbatore, Tamil Nadu, India
- Education: FTII
- Occupations: Cinematographer; Director

K. V. Guhan is an Indian cinematographer from Chennai, India.

== Career ==
Guhan is the younger brother of the Tamil film director, Saran. He collaborated with director Radha Mohan, for two notable films in Tamil cinema, Mozhi (2007) and Payanam (2011). He was also lauded for his work in Athadu (2005), Jalsa (2008), Dookudu (2011), Baadshah (2013), and Aagadu (2014).

He made his directorial debut, in 2010, with Inidhu Inidhu, the remake of Happy Days (2007). It was produced by Prakash Raj, under Duet Movies. He has also directed the Telugu films, 118 (2019), WWW (2021), and Highway (2022). He worked as an assistant, under noted cinematographer, P. C. Sreeram.

In 2011, his work on Dookudu, was nominated for the SIIMA Award for Best Cinematographer (Telugu), at the 1st SIIMA.

== Filmography ==
Year	Film	Cinematographer	Director	Language
2003	Khushi	Yes	No	Hindi
2004	Naani New	Yes	No	Telugu; Tamil
2005	Athadu	Yes	No	Telugu
2006	Aarya	Yes	No	Tamil
2007	Mozhi	Yes	No	Tamil
2007	Muni	Yes	No	Tamil
2008	Jalsa	Yes	No	Telugu
2008	Velli Thirai	Yes	No	Tamil
2010	Inidhu Inidhu	Yes	Yes	Tamil
2011	Payanam Gaganam	Yes	No	Tamil; Telugu
2011	Dookudu	Yes	No	Telugu
2011	Dhoni	Yes	No	Telugu; Tamil
2013	Seethamma Vakitlo Sirimalle Chettu	Yes	No	Telugu
2013	Baadshah	Yes	No	Telugu
2014	Aagadu	Yes	No	Telugu
2016	Bangalore Naatkal	Yes	No	Tamil
2016	Thikka	Yes	No	Telugu
2017	Mister	Yes	No	Telugu
2017	Jawaan	Yes	No	Telugu
2019	118	Yes	Yes	Telugu
2019	Market Raja MBBS	Yes	No	Tamil
2021	WWW	Yes	Yes	Telugu
2022	Highway	Yes	Yes	Telugu
2024	Viswam	Yes	No	Telugu
2025	Thammudu	Yes	No	Telugu
