= Anil Sunkara =

Indian film producer

Anil Kumar Sunkara is an Indian film producer, director, distributor, and businessman who works primarily in Telugu cinema. He mainly produces films under his AK Entertainments banner. He is popularly known for producing the award-winning blockbuster Dookudu (2011). Ajay Sunkara, his younger brother, is a co-producer on most of his films. He has also produced Namo Venkatesa (2010), 1: Nenokkadine (2014), Legend (2014), Aagadu (2014), Krishna Gaadi Veera Prema Gaadha (2016), Hyper (2016), and LIE (2017) under 14 Reels Entertainment.

He is also the CEO of Advansoft International Inc.

== Filmography ==
As producer

Year	Title	Notes
2010	Bindaas	
2010	Namo Venkatesa	Produced under 14 Reels Entertainment
2011	Aha Naa Pellanta	
2011	Dookudu	Produced under 14 Reels Entertainment
2012	Vennela 1 1/2	
2013	Action 3D	
2014	1: Nenokkadine	Produced under 14 Reels Entertainment
2014	Legend	Produced under 14 Reels Entertainment
2014	Power	Remake of Dookudu; Produced under 14 Reels Entertainment
2014	Aagadu	Produced under 14 Reels Entertainment
2015	James Bond	
2016	Krishna Gaadi Veera Prema Gaadha	Produced under 14 Reels Entertainment
2016	Run	
2016	Eedo Rakam Aado Rakam	
2016	Hyper	Produced under 14 Reels Entertainment
2016	Eedu Gold Ehe	
2017	Kittu Unnadu Jagratha	
2017	Andhhagadu	
2017	LIE	Produced under 14 Reels Entertainment
2018	Kirrak Party	
2018	Raju Gadu	
2019	Sita	
2019	Chanakya	
2020	Sarileru Neekevvaru	
2021	Bangaru Bullodu	
2021	Mahasamudram	
2023	Agent	
2023	Bhola Shankar	
2025	Mazaka	
2026	Nari Nari Naduma Murari	

As director

Year	Film	Notes
2013	Action 3D	Debut

As presenter

Year	Film
2014	Chandamama Kathalu
2015	Raju Gari Gadhi
2016	Selfie Raja
2023	Samajavaragamana
2023	Hidimba
2024	Ooru Peru Bhairavakona

As distributor

Year	Film
2018	Goodachari
2026	G2

== Awards ==
- CineMAA Awards in Best Film category for the film in Dookudu(2011) 2012.
- Filmfare Award for Best Film – Telugu for the film Dookudu(2011) in 2012.
- SIIMA Award for Best Film - Telugu for the film Dookudu(2011) in 2012.
- Times of India Film Awards in the Best Film category for the film Dookudu(2011) in 2012.
- Nandi Award for Best Popular Feature Film for the film Dookudu(2011) in 2013.
- National Film Award for Best Feature Film in Telugu for the film Chandamama Kathalu (2014) in 2015

== See also ==
- Telugu cinema
- SIIMA Award for Best Film
- Filmfare Award for Best Film – Telugu
- National Film Award for Best Feature Film in Telugu
