= Namo Venkatesa =

2010 film directed by Srinu Vaitla

- Theatrical release poster
- Directed by: Srinu Vaitla
- Screenplay by: Srinu Vaitla
- Dialogues by: Chintapalli Ramana
- Story by: Gopimohan
- Produced by: Ram Achanta; Gopichand Achanta; Anil Sunkara
- Starring: Venkatesh; Trisha
- Cinematography: Prasad Murella
- Edited by: M. R. Varma
- Music by: Devi Sri Prasad
- Production companies: Suresh Productions; 14 Reels Entertainment
- Release date: 14 January 2010
- Running time: 152 minutes
- Country: India
- Language: Telugu

Namo Venkatesa (transl. Hail Venkatesa) is a 2010 Indian Telugu-language action comedy film written and directed by Srinu Vaitla from a story written by Gopimohan. Produced by 14 Reels Entertainment and Suresh Productions, it stars Venkatesh and Trisha in lead roles with Brahmanandam, Mukesh Rishi, Subbaraju, Akash, and Ali in supporting roles. The music was composed by Devi Sri Prasad with cinematography by Prasad Murella and editing by M. R. Varma. The film was theatrically released on 14 January 2010.

== Plot ==
Venkataramana a.k.a. Venky is a ventriloquist. He is a naive and good adult, and everyone in his association usually likes him. An astrologer named Palasa predicts that if he does not get married in one month, he will be a single man forever. Venky goes to Paris as part of a group to perform for NRIs, where he meets Paris Prasad and his gang. They fool everyone and try to avoid giving them remuneration. Venky manages them and gets his and his troops' payment. Later, Venky meets Pooja, the niece of Prasad, and falls in love. Though Pooja has no feelings for Venky, Prasad tells him that Pooja too loves him, just for fun.

Slowly, Pooja and Venky become friends, and Pooja gets an emergency call from India, where she finds out that her family, especially her grandfather arranged her marriage with Bhadrappa (Subbaraju), the son of her uncle, Changala Rayudu. She does not want to marry him and calls Prasad for help. She offers money to him if he could take her back to Paris. Prasad takes the risk as he needs money to repay the bank loan. He asks Venky for help, telling him that Pooja wants to marry him, but her family wants her to marry Bhadrappa. Venky innocently believes him and comes to Rayalaseema to take Pooja away.

There, Venky introduces himself to everyone as Praneeth and offers the partnership of a fake multimillion-dollar factory. In the hope of that partnership, everyone treats him nicely and makes minor changes in their household to please him. Prasad tells Pooja that he fooled Venky and asks her to go with his drama to escape from that place. Though she does not want to fool Venky, she reluctantly agrees to Prasad's plan as she needs to get out of there desperately. Actually, she loves an NRI named Ajay and wants to elope with him.

Finally, Venky succeeds to trick them and take Pooja and Prasad away. Pooja plans to escape with Ajay to Europe, but Venky takes them to his area in Hyderabad. He introduces his family, which includes his uncles Narayana and Malesh Yadav. Everybody receives Pooja affectionately and makes arrangements for their wedding. Prasad and Ajay try to tell them the truth but could not succeed.

Bhaddrapa's grandfather overhears the conversation of Pooja's mother with Pooja on the phone and devises a plan to call them to their village and kill Venky. They tell Pooja that they will conduct their wedding within their place and asks her to come back. However, Venky ends up coming with his full family and friends, roughly a few hundred, failing their plan to kill him. Finally, he discovers that Pooja loves Ajay and not him. Though devastated, he still wishes her happiness and saves them from their uncle's gang. Seeing his selfless love, Pooja's uncle and others stop fighting him and reconcile. At the end, however, Pooja realises that she loves Venky. Ajay understands this and leaves the decision in her hands. Finally, Pooja and Venky marry with everyone's blessings.

== Cast ==
- Venkatesh as Parvateneni "Venky" Venkataramana / Praneeth
- Trisha as Pooja
- Brahmanandam as Paris Prasad, Pooja's uncle
- Mukesh Rishi as Chengala Rayudu, Pooja's father
- Sumithra as Lakshmi, Pooja's mother
- Kota Srinivasa Rao as Malesh Yadav, Venky's uncle
- Giri Babu as Rama Chandra Murthy, Venky's father
- Chandra Mohan as Narayana, Venky's uncle
- Suhasini Maniratnam as Snehalatha, Venky's mother
- Telangana Shakuntala as Shakuntala, Venky's aunt
- Jaya Prakash Reddy as JayPrakash Garu, Bhaddrapa's grandfather
- Subbaraju as Bhaddrappa
- Akash as Ajay, Pooja's friend
- Ali as Sheikh Raj
- M. S. Narayana as Palasa, an astrologist
- Dharmavarapu Subramanyam as Bhaddrappa's grandfather's brother-in-law
- Y. Kasi Viswanath as Ramanujam
- Master Bharath as Puppy
- Srinivasa Reddy as Murthy
- Sivannarayana Naripeddi as Priest
- Sudha as Amrutham, Pooja's aunt
- Vinaya Prasad as Janaki, Pooja's aunt
- Pragathi as Lalita, Pooja's aunt
- Surekha Vani as Prasad's wife
- Jeeva as Soda Sambayya
- Gundu Sudharshan as Chary
- Raghu Babu as Srinivas
- Pruthvi Raj as Prasad's gang member
- Surya as Prasad's gang member
- Siva Reddy as Srinivas's student
- Kalpika Ganesh
- Giridhar as Srinivas's student
- Sravan as Bhairagi
- Jenny
- Satya Prakash
- Gemini Suresh

== Production ==
85% of the shoot was complete by November 2009. Towards the end of the shoot, Venkatesh had chikungunya but still shot for two songs including the title song so that the film could release for Sankranti.

== Soundtrack ==
Namo Venkatesa

Soundtrack album by Devi Sri Prasad
- Released: 2010
- Genre: Soundtrack
- Length: 24:08
- Label: Aditya Music
- Producer: Devi Sri Prasad

Devi Sri Prasad chronology
Kutty (2010)	Namo Venkatesa (2010)	Singam (2010)

The music for the film was composed by Devi Sri Prasad in his second collaboration with actor Venkatesh after Tulasi. The lyrics were written by Ramajogayya Sastry. The soundtrack was released by Aditya Music. The audio launch was held at Bangkok on 5 January 2010.

Track listing
No.	Title	Singer(s)	Length
1.	"Namo Venkatesa"	Mano, Megha	4:11
2.	"Soundarya"	Venu	5:03
3.	"Tottadoing"	Benny Dayal, Tippu, Priya Himesh	4:44
4.	"Nee Kallalo"	Sagar, Roshini	4:35
5.	"Ding Dong"	Shankar Mahadevan, Priya Himesh, Chorus	4:23
6.	"Non Stop"	Karthik, Sunitha Sarathy	4:12
Total length:			24:08

== Reception ==
A critic from Rediff.com rated the film 2.5/5 stars and wrote, "Namo Venkatesa provides wholesome fun for the family".
