= Dookudu =

2011 Indian film by Srinu Vaitla

- Theatrical release poster
- Directed by: Srinu Vaitla
- Screenplay by: Srinu Vaitla
- Dialogues by: Srinu Vaitla; Kona Venkat
- Story by: Srinu Vaitla; Gopimohan
- Produced by: Ram Achanta; Gopichand Achanta; Anil Sunkara
- Starring: Mahesh Babu; Samantha; Prakash Raj; Sonu Sood
- Cinematography: K. V. Guhan; Prasad Murella
- Edited by: M. R. Varma
- Music by: Thaman S
- Production company: 14 Reels Entertainment
- Distributed by: GMB Entertainment
- Release date: 23 September 2011 (India)
- Running time: 175 minutes
- Country: India
- Language: Telugu
- Budget: ₹35 crore
- Box office: ₹101 crore

Dookudu (transl. Aggression) is a 2011 Indian Telugu-language action comedy film directed by Srinu Vaitla and written by Vaitla, Kona Venkat, and Gopimohan. It is produced by Ram Achanta, Gopi Achanta, and Anil Sunkara under the banner 14 Reels Entertainment. The film stars Mahesh Babu, Samantha, Prakash Raj, and Sonu Sood alongside Brahmanandam who played a supporting role. The film revolves around Ajay Kumar (Babu), a police officer and son of ex-MLA Shankar Narayana (Raj), who awakes from coma, but his health remains perilous. To aid his recovery, Kumar masquerades as a MLA fulfilling his father's ambition for him, while also hunting his father's foes. The film was inspired by the 2003 German film Good Bye, Lenin!.

The film began production on 28 June 2010 at Hyderabad. Shooting began on 22 October 2010 in Turkey and lasted till mid-September 2011. The film was predominantly shot in Hyderabad, with portions shot in Mumbai, Gujarat, Istanbul, Dubai, and Switzerland. Thaman S composed the music and M. R. Varma edited the film, while K. V. Guhan handled the cinematography after Prasad Murella left the project mid-way.

Dookudu was released on 23 September 2011 on 1800 screens worldwide. Upon release, Dookudu received positive reviews and was declared a success at the box-office. It was cited as "The biggest hit you've never heard of" by the Los Angeles Times. The film collected a distributor share of over ₹56.7 crore in its lifetime and grossed roughly ₹100 crore in its lifetime making it the highest-grossing Telugu film of that year and the second highest-grossing Telugu film of all time. In addition, the film won various accolades, which include seven Nandi Awards, six Filmfare Awards, eight SIIMA Awards and eight CineMAA Awards.

The film was remade in Bengali as Challenge 2 (2012) and in Kannada as Power (2014). It was dubbed in Hindi as The Real Tiger, Tamil as Athiradi Vettai and Malayalam as Choodan, Odia as Dookudu, and Kannada as Police Power.

== Plot ==
During the political realm of N. T. Rama Rao, Shankar Narayana is an independent MLA of the constituency of Shankar Nagar, which is named after him, in Hyderabad, and is regarded as a champion for the poor. When a truck collides with the car his brother Satyam and he is in, Shankar goes into a coma. Except for his family, everyone else presumes that he is killed in the accident. His son Ajay is a police officer in Mumbai who fights against the mafia and is on a mission to apprehend Mafia don Nayak who is involved in illegal drug trade, extortion, and arms trafficking.

When he heads to Turkey in an undercover operation, he meets Prashanthi, the daughter of Ajay's senior police officer and soon falls in love with her. She initially rejects his advances, so he pretends to give up. However, he is successful in the undercover operation and arrests Nayak's brother Bunty. After returning to India, he again meets Prashanthi. He tells her father to appreciate what she does and not be so strict. This, to his surprise, makes her reciprocates his feelings. In an attempt to arrest Nayak, Bunty and the police commissioner are killed and Shankar's loyal follower Sivayya reveals to Ajay that Nayak, along with Shankar's rival, Mallesh Gowda, and Shankar's other followers Meka Narsingh Rao, Ambarpet Ganesh, were behind Shankar's accident, so Ajay plots to kill all of them.

When Shankar comes out of the coma, the doctors who treated him advise his family that his life is at risk if he encounters or hears anything upsetting, disturbing, or shocking. Ajay hides the events surrounding the accident and shifts his family to his previously abandoned mansion which is now being used for film-making. Ajay creates a dummy political set-up at this mansion. In the guise of a reality television program, Ajay tricks an aspiring but unsuccessful film actor Padmasri by making him believe that the television show is being sponsored by actor Akkineni Nagarjuna's television channel and that Nagarjuna wants to offer Padmasri high remuneration for his realistic performance in the show. On the other hand, aspiring actors Bokka Venkata Rao and Mallesh Goud are tricked by Ajay with a real estate business deal to exploit his criminal nexus.

Ajay keeps this drama under wraps from Shankar by making him believe that Ajay is also an MLA revered by people fulfilling his dad's wishes. He marries Prashanthi after gaining her family's consent much to Shankar's delight. Meanwhile, Ajay manages to kill Ganesh and Mallesh without the knowledge of anybody while Shankar believes that they died due to ailments. Nayak reaches Hyderabad to kill Ajay and Ajay's drama is exposed before everybody except Shankar. Meka Narsingh Rao is killed by Nayak while the latter's henchmen are killed by Ajay and others in an encounter. Nayak is later killed in a Ramleela event. Shankar also learns of Ajay's drama and is happy about the affection his son showed for him.

== Cast ==
- Mahesh Babu as DCP G. Ajay Kumar IPS
- Samantha as Prasanthi (Voice dubbed by Chinmayi)
- Prakash Raj as MLA Shankar Narayana, Ajay's father
- Sonu Sood as Nayak (Voice dubbed by Aziz Naser)
- Brahmanandam as Padmasri
- M. S. Narayana as Bokka Venkatrao, Meka Narsing Rao's brother-in-law
- Adithya Menon as Sivayya, Shankar Narayana's trusted aid.
- Sonia Deepti as Prasanthi's friend
- Nassar as DCP Murthy, Prasanthi's father
- Sayaji Shinde as Minister Meka Narsingh Rao
- Kota Srinivasa Rao as Mallesh Goud
- Supreeth as Ambarpet Ganesh
- Tanikella Bharani as Ramachandra, Ajay's uncle
- Chandra Mohan as Tulasi Ram, Ajay's uncle
- Ajaz Khan as Bunty, Nayak's younger brother
- Pragathi as Padma, Prasanthi's mother
- Shafi as Qadir, Nayak's henchman
- Vennela Kishore as M. S. Shastry Ramanujam IPS
- Suman as Commissioner Ramprasad
- Naga Babu as Commissioner Suryaprakash
- Dharmavarapu Subramanyam as "Cool" Babu
- Ravi Prakash as Ravi Prakash IPS
- Vinaya Prasad as Lakshmi, Tulasi Ram's wife
- Satya Krishnan as Radha, Ajay's elder cousin's sister
- Rajiv Kanakala as Sathyam, Shankar Narayana's brother
- Subbaraju as Dinesh Goud, Mallesh Goud's elder son
- Prabhakar as Prakash Goud, Mallesh Goud's younger son
- Brahmaji as Prakasam, Junior Artist supplier
- Siva Reddy as SI Siva Reddy/Kaki Janaki 'Kaja'
- Surekha Vani as Mithra, Ajay's mother
- Srinivasa Reddy as Director Srinivas
- Ajay as Narendra IPS, Nayak's henchman and Ajay's colleague who gives information to Nayak (Mole in Department)
- Master Bharath as Muddu Krishna, Meka Narsing Rao's son
- Sanjay Swaroop as Dr. Rajendran, Shankar's doctor
- Sudha as Janaki, Ajay's Aunt
- Shravan Raghavendra as Shravan IPS
- Shankar Melkote as Rangarao
- Prudhvi Raj as Dummy Dr. Chanti
- Pradeep Kabra as Raju, Nayak's henchman
- Shriya Sharma as Sushanti, Prashanti's sister
- Bharath Raju as Sunny
- Parvati Melton as an Item number in the song "Poovai Poovai"
- Meenakshi Dixit in the song "Nee Dookudu"

== Production ==
=== Development and casting ===
Ram Achanta, Gopi Achanta and Anil Sunkara under the banner 14 Reels Entertainment agreed to bankroll a film directed by Srinu Vaitla starring Mahesh Babu in the lead role after completing their debut venture Namo Venkatesa (2010). Regarding the same, Vaitla said that it would be a romance action film and a majority would be shot in North India using a Super 35. Vaitla worked on the script for more than a year and shelved it temporarily for further modification as he felt it became monotonous and resembles his previous work.

Prasad Murella was selected as the cinematographer who walked out after having an argument on the film's sets with Vaitla because of differences. K. V. Guhan was selected to finish the remaining part. Regarding the same, Vaitla said "I had made family dramas with Prasad before but in Dookudu, the demand increased from my side and we couldn't get in sync with each other. I liked the photography in Athadu done by Guhan. We gelled and he has done a fantastic job."

Sonu Sood was cast as the antagonist. Gopimohan denied the latter's inclusion as a rumour while the former's inclusion remained unconfirmed. Parvati Melton was selected for an item number. Regarding the limited role of Samantha, Vaitla clarified that a lot depended on the film's subject and it was done mainly to develop the chemistry between the lead pair.

=== Filming ===
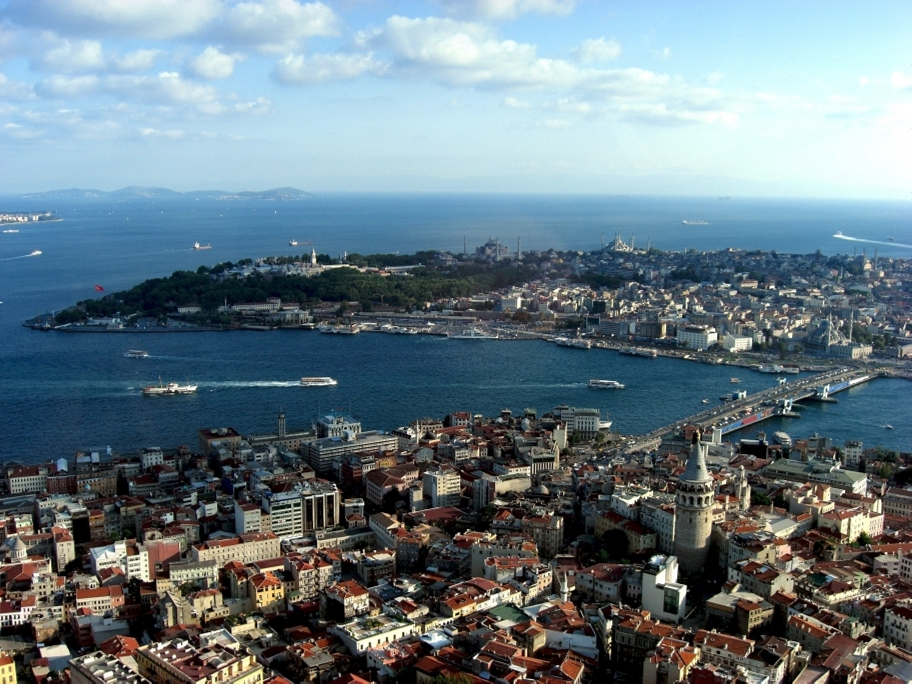
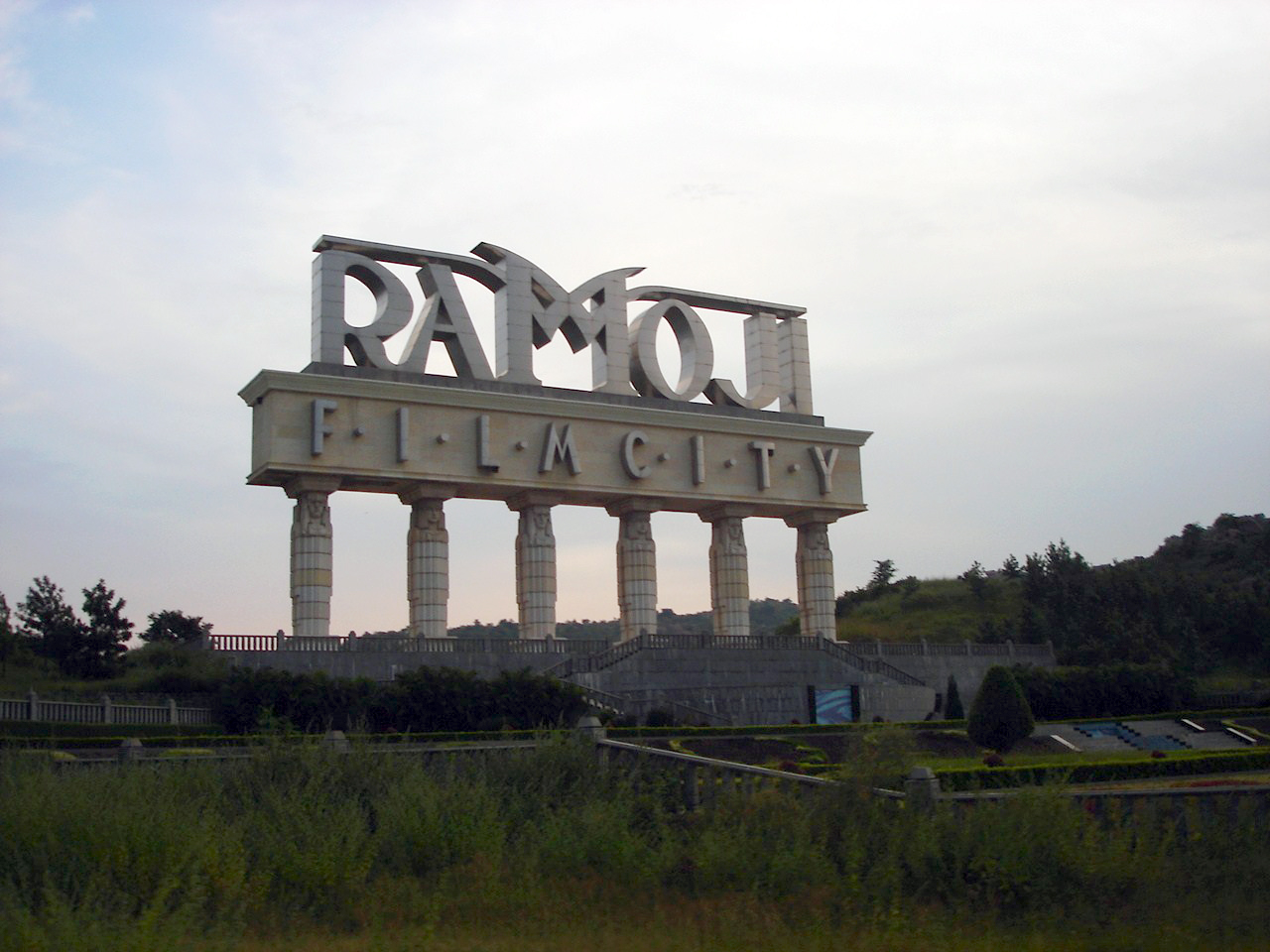
Istanbul (left) and Ramoji Film City (right), where the film was significantly shot.

The second schedule was conducted in Dubai.

Filming continued in Gujarat where a song on Babu and Samantha was shot at the Little Rann of Kutch. On its completion on 11 February 2011, the next schedule was planned to be shot in Hyderabad from 15 February 2011 to 3 March 2011.

Some scenes were shot in a central jail set erected in Ramoji Film City with which the Hyderabad schedule was completed in mid May 2011. Some comedy and action scenes were shot in the set which was earlier erected for Dhee (2007), Old City and other areas apart from Ramoji Film City. A long schedule was shot in Switzerland later and Babu stayed back for taking rest on the schedule's completion and returned on 30 May 2011 to participate in the shoot from the next day. Due to unforeseen circumstances, the film's shoot was delayed multiple times and by late June 2011, 40 days of shoot was pending.

The filming came to an end in September 2011.

== Themes and influences ==
Many critics have stated that the film's story is inspired by the German tragicomedy Good Bye, Lenin! (2003). Regarding the same, Vaitla said "I saw Good Bye, Lenin! when the scripting of Dookudu was 50 per cent complete. It was a coincidence. I had the idea of showing Mahesh in a new way as a young MLA. I also had the idea of the father. Then, Gopimohan came in, and we worked on the script for seven months. It's a multi-layered film and writing the screenplay for it was tough." He added that the idea of how lies are told and you get people to believe them was already shown in his earlier film Ready (2008). He chose a father-son relationship in the film as he wanted to show the emotions between them. Apart from that, Vaitla was inspired by other small things from Good Bye, Lenin!. One such inspired sequence is where the protagonist and his team create fake news broadcasts and newspapers for showing them to his father to make the drama believable which includes making N. T. Rama Rao the Prime minister of India in 2011. And, the scene where the protagonist lies to his father about few things without knowing that the latter is aware of the drama is inspired from the climax of Good Bye, Lenin!.

A reviewer from Sify felt that some of the scenes and characters are inspired by Babu's previous films Athadu (2005) and Pokiri (2006) apart from the Hindi Patiala House (2011). In one of the comedy scenes, M. S. Narayana is seen performing spoofs of Yamadonga (2007), Magadheera (2009), Simha (2010) and Enthiran (2010). According to K. Moti Gokulsing and Wimal Dissanayake, authors of the book Routledge Handbook of Indian Cinemas, the parodies too received positive response.

== Music ==
Thaman S composed the soundtrack which consists of six songs. Viswa and Bhaskarabhatla penned lyrics of one song each while Ramajogayya Sastry penned lyrics for the remaining songs. The film's soundtrack, marketed by Aditya Music, was unveiled by hosting a promotional event at Shilpakala Vedika on 19 August 2011. The soundtrack was successful in its collections.

== Marketing ==
The teaser poster featuring Babu along with a teaser trailer was unveiled on 31 May 2011 on the birthday eve of Babu's father, actor Krishna Ghattamaneni. In an interview to Karthik Pasupulate of The Times of India, Anil Sunkara said "When the pre-release hype was hitting a fever pitch, we (producers) toured all over the state, meeting fan associations and telling them that it was a family entertainer, and distributing merchandise like stickers, badges and ribbons".

A thanksgiving tour began in Vijayawada where Vaitla, Anil and comedian Siva Reddy promoted the film at Hotel Mid City after which they went to Eluru. The film's success meet was held at Hotel Novotel in Hyderabad on 11 October 2011. Another event was planned at Vijayawada for celebrating the completion of the film's 50-day run. The event was held at Velagapudi Ramakrishna Siddhartha Engineering College grounds on 12 November 2011. Udaya Bhanu hosted the event.

== Release ==
=== Distribution ===
The film was announced to be released on 23 September 2011 by the producers in the end of August 2011 after the release of the soundtrack. The film released in 15 screens in Chennai.

==== Screening and statistics ====
The film released in 1600 screens worldwide and 89 theatres in North America. It was released in 21 countries including Canada, Trinidad, South Africa, Netherlands and Finland making it the first Telugu film to be released there. It became the first Telugu film to be released in 21 cities in North India. The film released in 79 theatres in the United States. It became the first Telugu film to be released in Botswana. The Telugu Association of Botswana screened it in Village Cinema at 10:30 am on 9 October 2011 with each ticket costing 40 pula. Apart from them, the film released in countries like Singapore, Dubai, Malaysia, Ireland and United Kingdom while the producers received calls from Nairobi for the distribution rights.

==== Legal issues ====
The film was shot at Vikarabad railway station on 31 July 2011 after seeking necessary permission to shoot till 5:00 pm with police security. The shoot was called off because of rain and Babu left the premises at 4:30 pm. Shortly, seven Telangana Students JAC activists landed at the railway station raising slogans against Samaikhyandhra supporters. On seeing them, the crew started preparing to vacate the spot. While they were leaving, the activists started pelting stones at them. Police later dispersed the mob and production manager Rambabu and Ramesh filed a complaint against them.

The activists disrupted the screening of the film in six theatres in Ranga Reddy district and accused the unit members for registering false cases against them during the film's shoot at a railway station. They entered theatres at Vikarabad, Parigi, Tandoor, Chevella and Shamshabad and asked the managements not to screen the film but were dispersed by the police. Later Rambabu and Ramesh met them and assured them that the cases would be withdrawn immediately. Police protection was given to the theatres screening the film in Hyderabad while the screening was much delayed in many centres in Telangana. The shows began from 6:00 am in all other regions, particularly in the ceded area.

=== Home media ===
Illegally copied versions of the film's DVDs were seized by the Vijayawada city police on 11 October 2011. FICUS Inc., released the overseas DVD on 16 March 2012. The film is also available on Disney+ Hotstar.

== Reception ==
=== Critical reception ===
Suresh Kavirayani of The Times of India rated it 4 out of 5 and wrote "Dookudu is a typical Srinu Vytla film with a generous sprinkling of comedy. His narrative manages to keep the audience engaged until the end of the movie. This movie comes as a blessing for not just Mahesh Babu, but also for Tollywood, which is badly in need of a hit, after the recent spate of box office debacles. Srinu Vytla and Mahesh Babu have come out with a winner in Dookudu". Sify called the film "entertaining" and wrote "Despite the drawbacks, Dookudu holds the power to lure the crowds, with its commercial values. It is a bonanza to Mahesh Babu's fans and it will not disappoint the family crowds either." IANS rated it 3.5 out of 5 and stated "Dookudu is a treat for Mahesh's fans. But others can also enjoy this film for its comedy elements and Mahesh's powerful presence." Jeevi of Idlebrain.com rated the film 3. 5 out of 5 and wrote, "Mahesh Babu delivers an universally acceptable entertainer in the form of Dookudu after a gap of five years. Go and watch it".

In contrast, B. V. S. Prakash of Deccan Chronicle rated the film 3 out of 5 and wrote "Although, it is a tale of an honest cop who is on the trail of a dreaded don, director Sinu Vaitla relies on a band of comedians like Brahmanandam and M.S. Narayana to sustain audience interests, before his protagonist accomplishes his mission. Audiences have to leave behind their thinking caps at home to enjoy this comic-caper since the screenplay has few gaping holes and is repetitive as well." Pavithra Srinivasan of Rediff gave it 2.5 out of 5 and criticised the film's screenplay and logic-defying sequences, but praised Babu's performance, calling his role a "cakewalk" and recommending the film for his fans in particular.

=== Box office ===
Dookudu crossed the $1 million mark in the United States and grossed ₹1.5 crore in two days, in United Kingdom, Australia, Dubai and Canada. The film's three-day worldwide total became ₹21.22 crore and in three days, the film surpassed the records set by Magadheera and Simha in terms of first weekend collections.

By the end of its second week, Dookudu grossed ₹70 crore at the worldwide box office. The film grossed roughly ₹112 crore by the end of its lifetime run at the worldwide Box office. The film completed 50 days in 312 centres and 100 days in 63 centres.

== Legacy ==
Dookudu became one of the biggest hits in the history of Telugu cinema and was the biggest hit in Babu's career by the end of its lifetime run. The film ended the five-year career slump of Babu and marked his image makeover. The Times of India called it one of the top ten must watch Telugu films of 2011. The Los Angeles Times wrote a special article about Babu and the film's massive collections in United States and called the film "The biggest hit you've never heard of". After the film's gross crossed ₹1 billion, Income Tax Department officials conducted a raid on the Jubilee Hills residence of Babu as he was rumoured to get a remuneration of more than ₹120 million for his next projects.

The film's success made Samantha one of the most sought heroines in Telugu cinema. Melton received more offers for performing item numbers post the film's release. Vaitla's next film with Babu namely Aagadu (2014), which too was produced by 14 Reels Entertainment and had the same technical crew of this film, was a failure at the box office. The Hindu cited similarities with Dookudu as one of the reasons of the film's failure.

== Other versions ==
Dookudu was dubbed and released by 14 Reels Entertainment into Tamil entitled Athiradi Vettai and Malayalam entitled Choodan in 2013. The film was also dubbed into Hindi as The Real Tiger in 2012 and into Odia under the same title as the original Telugu version sometime in 2018 at the earliest, plus Kannada as Police Power in 2021, despite the existence of a remake in that language. The film was remade in Kannada as Power (2014) and in Bengali as Challenge 2 (2012).

== Sources ==
- Gokulsing, K. Moti; Dissanayake, Wimal (2013). Routledge Handbook of Indian Cinemas. Routledge. ISBN 978-0-415-67774-5.
