= Srinu Vaitla =

Indian filmmaker (born 1972)

- Born: 24 September 1972 (age 53); Kandulapalem, East Godavari district, Andhra Pradesh, India
- Occupation: Film director
- Years active: 1999–present
- Spouse: Rupa
- Children: 3

Srinu Vaitla (born 24 September 1972) is an Indian film director and screenwriter known for his work in Telugu cinema, particularly in the action comedy genre. He has received several accolades, including five Nandi Awards—three for Best Screenplay Writer—and a Filmfare Award South for Best Director – Telugu.

Vaitla made his directorial debut with the romantic film Nee Kosam (1999) and gained recognition with Anandam (2001), also a romantic drama. He later shifted to comedy and action-comedy films, directing projects such as Sontham (2002), Venky (2004), Dhee (2007), Dubai Seenu (2007), Ready (2008), King (2008), Dookudu (2011), and Baadshah (2013). His films from Sontham onward are widely referenced in Telugu popular culture and have attained cult status for their comedy scenes and characters. Since Venky, he has frequently collaborated with writers Kona Venkat and Gopi Mohan.

== Early life ==
Srinu Vaitla was born in Kandulapalem near Ramachandrapuram in the erstwhile East Godavari district of Andhra Pradesh. He completed his intermediate education in Kakinada. He developed a strong interest in cinema and frequently watched films instead of attending college. Inspired by directors Mani Ratnam and Vamsy, he decided to pursue a career in the Telugu film industry. After completing his intermediate education in 1989, he boarded the Bokaro Express from Samalkot to Madras, aiming to establish himself in the industry.

== Filmography ==
Films as director
Year	Title	Director	Story	Screenplay	Dialogues
1999	Nee Kosam	Yes	Yes	Yes	No
2001	Anandam	Yes	Yes	Yes	No
2002	Sontham	Yes	Yes	Yes	No
2004	Anandamanandamaye	Yes	Yes	Yes	No
2004	Venky	Yes	Yes	Yes	No
2005	Andarivaadu	Yes	No	Yes	No
2007	Dhee	Yes	No	Yes	No
2007	Dubai Seenu	Yes	Yes	Yes	No
2008	Ready	Yes	No	Yes	No
2008	King	Yes	No	Yes	No
2010	Namo Venkatesa	Yes	No	Yes	No
2011	Dookudu	Yes	Yes	Yes	Yes
2013	Baadshah	Yes	No	Yes	Yes
2014	Aagadu	Yes	Yes	Yes	Yes
2015	Bruce Lee - The Fighter	Yes	Yes	Yes	No
2017	Mister	Yes	No	Yes	No
2018	Amar Akbar Anthony	Yes	Yes	Yes	Yes
2024	Viswam	Yes	Yes	No	Yes

As actor

- Rainbow (2008)

== Awards ==
- Nandi Award for Best Feature Film (Nee Kosam)
- Nandi Award for Best First Film of a Director (Nee Kosam)
- Nandi Award for Best Screenplay Writer (Nee Kosam)
- Nandi Award for Best Screenplay Writer (Dhee)
- Nandi Award for Best Screenplay Writer (Dookudu)
- Filmfare Award for Best Director - Telugu (Dookudu)
- CinemAA Awards – Best Director (Dookudu)
- South Indian International Movie Awards – Best Director (Dookudu)
- Times of India Film Awards – Best Director (Dookudu)
