= Bruce Lee: The Fighter =

2015 Indian film by Srinu Vaitla

- Theatrical release poster
- Directed by: Sreenu Vaitla
- Screenplay by: Sreenu Vaitla
- Story by: Sreenu Vaitla; Kona Venkat; Gopimohan
- Produced by: D. V. V. Danayya
- Starring: Ram Charan; Arun Vijay; Rakul Preet Singh; Kriti Kharbanda; Sampath Raj; Nadhiya
- Cinematography: Manoj Paramahamsa
- Edited by: M. R. Varma
- Music by: S. Thaman
- Production company: DVV Entertainments
- Release date: 16 October 2015
- Running time: 155 minutes
- Country: India
- Language: Telugu

Bruce Lee: The Fighter is a 2015 Indian Telugu-language action comedy film directed by Sreenu Vaitla and produced by D. V. V. Danayya under DVV Entertainments. The film stars Ram Charan, alongside Arun Vijay, Rakul Preet Singh, Kriti Kharbanda, Sampath Raj and Nadhiya. The music was composed by S. Thaman, while the cinematography and editing were handled by Manoj Paramahamsa and M. R. Varma. In the film, Karthik, a stuntman, is mistaken for a cop, where he helps to unearth the schemes of Deepak Raj, a drug peddler and his father Jayaraj.

Srinu Vaitla narrated the script to Charan in March 2014, and planned to work on the story post the release of Aagadu. The film was launched on 5 March 2015, and the principal photography of the film took place on 16 March 2015, which was started on 6 October 2014. Filmed across Hyderabad, Spain and Bangkok, The film was shot in 110 working days with 15 working hours per day.

Bruce Lee: The Fighter was released on 16 October 2015, during the festival of Navaratri, to negative reviews from critics and became a box-office bomb. One of the sub-plots of the film where Karthik (Ram Charan) is mistaken for a cop by Ria (Rakul Preet Singh) was reportedly inspired from the 2006 French film The Valet. The film was remade in Bangladesh as Beporowa and remains Kriti Kharbanda's last Telugu film till date.

== Plot ==
Karthik and Kavya are the children of Rama Chandra Rao. Rama Chandra Rao wants to make Karthik as an IAS officer. The only problem is that Kavya wants to become a collector as well, but Rama Chandra Rao cannot afford to pay for both of their studies. Because of this, Karthik sacrifices his exams so that his sister can join Delhi Public School in order to become a collector.

Years later, Karthik aka Bruce Lee is a stunt performer working under Dangerous David, and Kavya is studying for CSE Exam. Once, Karthik goes in the middle of a shoot to a hotel to save his friend's sister, who was being kidnapped. Ria is a game designer, who came there to meet a cop for marriage sees Karthik in his police costume and mistakes him for a cop. She becomes his fan and rejects the other cop, as he is corrupt.

Some days later, Karthik finds out that Ria uploaded the video of him fighting in a police costume on Facebook. When he goes to meet her, he falls for her and finds out that she is designing a video game called Super Cop based on him. From then on, Ria spends time with him continuously, while Karthik is still afraid of revealing his identity as he fears that she might leave him. Meanwhile, a terrorist attack occurs in a hotel where Karthik's cousin brother Ravi finds evidence to prove that it was not a terrorist attack but an attempt to kill two IB officers by a drug peddler named Deepak Raj.

Ravi goes to Commissioner Marthand, but Marthand is actually in cahoots with Deepak, who knocks Ravi unconscious. Ria keeps getting Karthik into fights thinking that he is an undercover cop. Kavya writes her final exams needed and while she is returning, Deepak drugs her forcefully and arrests her to trick Ram Gopal to think that the kidnapped girl was his daughter. Karthik learns of the incident and thrashes up Deepak, sending him into a coma and returns in time for Kavya's engagement with Rahul, the son of Jayaraj and Vasundhara who are bosses of Rama Chandra Rao.

It is revealed that Deepak is the first son of Jayaraj with an unofficial wife, Malini. Later, Ria takes Karthik to meet her family and father is IB Chief Bharadwaj, who knows Karthik's identity and reveals Jayaraj's background to Karthik where they start a mission to bust and capture Jayaraj and Deepak. Following the plan, he joins Jayaraj's company as his assistant and uses Suzuki Subramanyam, an undercover cop, to reveal Jayaraj's secrets to Vasundhara, causing her to leave him. During Kavya's marriage, Karthik and Bharadwaj gathers evidence against Jayaraj-Deepak with Ravi's help (who was rescued by the officials).

Karthik reveals to Ria about his real identity, who forgives him and they reunite. Meanwhile, Deepak captures and shoots Karthik and orders their henchmen to pack him in a plastic bag and drop him on a nearby canal. His henchman carries out his order. Later, Jayaraj, with his men, tries to kill Vasundhara, Rahul and Kavya. Karthik arrives and reveals that he was aware of all of Deepak's plans, Because they had replaced G. Ramji, a corrupt inspector who is David's lookalike with David himself. Karthik was actually wearing a bulletproof vest and blood bombs in the shirt.

Deepak's shots caused the bombs to burst and also had escaped from the plastic bag. In the ensuring fight, Karthik kills Deepak and takes his body to Jayaraj, revealing his identity. Driven by vengeance, Jayaraj kidnaps Ria and stabs Rama Chandra Rao in front of him after he tells all about Karthik's sacrifices for his family. Karthik admits Ramachandra to the hospital and calls actor Chiranjeevi for help, who is busy filming Khaidi No. 150. Chiranjeevi arrives and thrashes up the goons and saves Ria. In the meantime, Suzuki arrests Jayaraj, finishing his last mission before he retires. During a celebration, Ria asks Karthik to fill up a form and become an actual police officer, to which everyone starts laughing.

== Cast ==
- Ram Charan as Karthik alias Bruce Lee
- Arun Vijay as Deepak Raj
- Rakul Preet as Ria Bharadwaj
- Kriti Kharbanda as Kavya, Karthik's sister
- Sampath Raj as Jayaraj, Deepak's father
- Nadhiya as Vasundhara (Jayaraj’s second Wife)
- Rao Ramesh as Rama Chandra Rao, Bruce Lee’s father
- Pavitra Lokesh as Karthik and Kavya's mother
- Mukesh Rishi as IB Chief Bharadwaj, Ria’s father
- Amitash Pradhaan as Rahul, Vasundhara's son
- Brahmanandam as Suzuki Subramanyam (IB Officer) aka Peter aka Pakoda aka Tukaram
- Tisca Chopra as Malini (Jayaraj's first wife)
- Jaya Prakash Reddy as Dangerous David and Inspector G. Ramji (dual role)
- Ali Basha as PK
- Sayaji Shinde as Marthand
- Ravi Prakash as Ravi Prakash DCP (IB), Karthik's elder cousin brother
- Tanikella Bharani as Ravi's father and Rama Chandra Rao's Big brother
- Naga Babu as Judge Ram Bhoopal, cameo appearance
- Brahmaji as 'Blockbuster' Bramhaji
- Posani Krishna Murali as Maccha Muthyam, Jayaraj's PA
- Saptagiri as Bruce Lee's friend
- Pradeep Machiraju as Bruce Lee's friend
- Vennela Kishore as Uganda Yugendhar, Malini’s younger brother
- Prudhviraj as Mani Ratnam, Vasundhara's PA
- Harsha Vardhan as Ria's uncle
- Raghu Karumanchi as Bruce Lee's friend
- Nagineedu as Karthik's uncle
- Samrat Reddy as Saketh
- Bharath Reddy as Jayaraj's henchman
- Satya as Bruce Lee's friend
- Venu Yeldandi as Bruce Lee's friend
- Satyam Rajesh as Babu Rao
- Shakalaka Shankar as Director Garapathi
- Sathya Prakash as Jayaraj's henchman
- Vamsi Krishna as Jayaraj's henchman
- Temper Vamsi as Tiger Bhai (gangster)
- Ajaz Khan as mass attacker (cameo appearance)
- Chiranjeevi as himself (cameo appearance)

== Production ==
=== Development ===
Sreenu Vaitla narrated a storyline to Ram Charan in late March 2014 and post the latter's approval, Vaitla planned to start work on the film's script after completing Aagadu (2014). D. V. V. Danayya, who produced Ram Charan's Naayak (2013), announced in late July 2014 that he would produce this film under the banner Universal Media and the pre-production works would begin soon. The production was expected to start in November 2014. The film was shelved post the release of Aagadu and was revived in late October 2014. After returning from a holiday in Kerala, Charan gave his nod in early December 2014 and Vaitla was busy giving final touches to the script which was said to be a fast-paced action comedy.

Charan informed the media that the film's production would commence in February 2015. My Name is Raju, a phrase picked up from the popular song of Jagadeka Veerudu Athiloka Sundari (1990) starring Chiranjeevi and Sridevi, was considered as the film's title. The makers announced that the film would be a family drama and would be bankrolled by Danayya under his new banner DVV Entertainments. The film was launched officially on 5 March 2015 at Danayya's office in Hyderabad. The film was said to have been inspired from the plot of the Telugu film Vijetha (1985). The makers contemplated to title the film as Bruce Lee in mid May 2015 considering the protagonist's character being a stuntman acting as a body double for actors, which was confirmed in late August 2015.

=== Casting ===
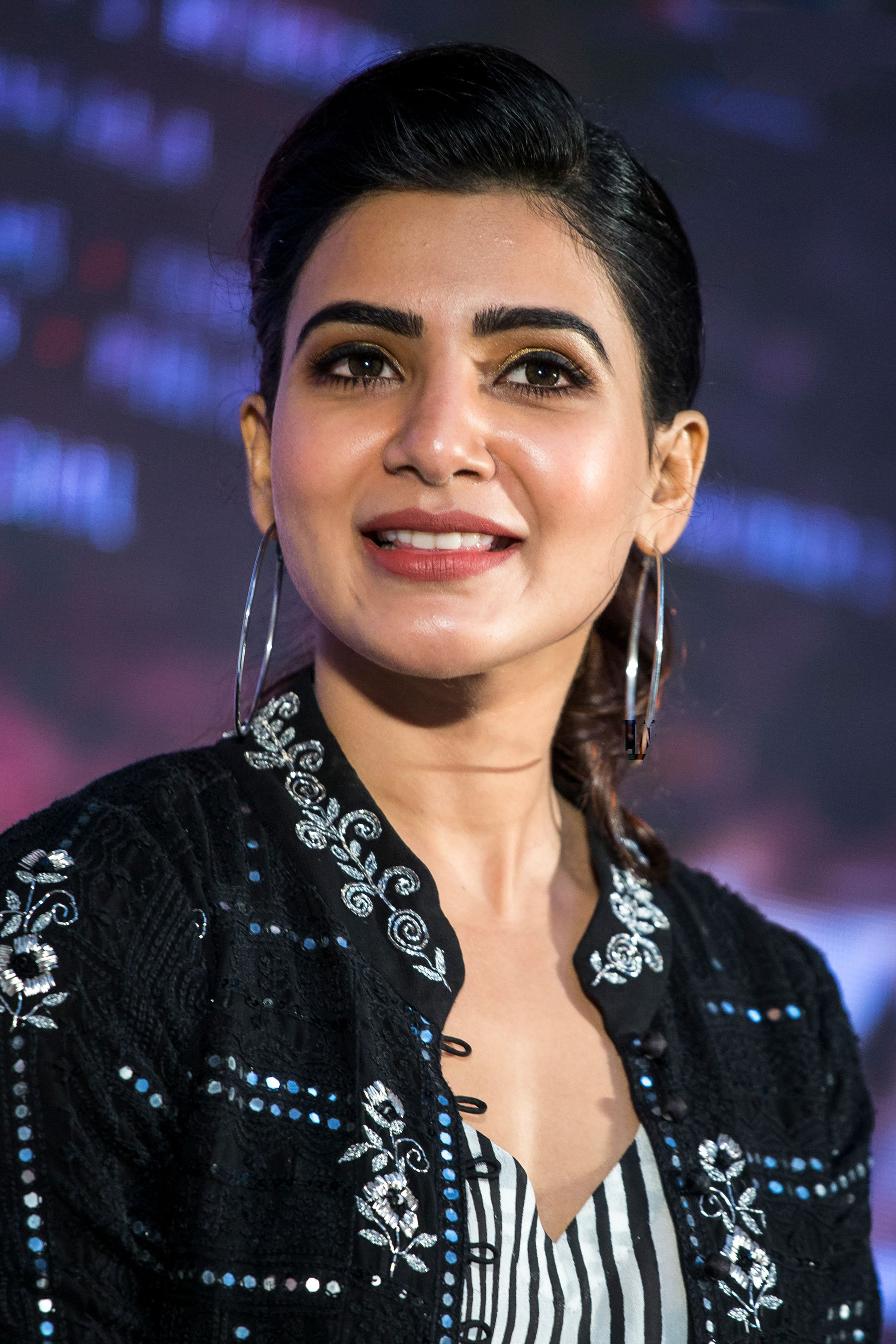
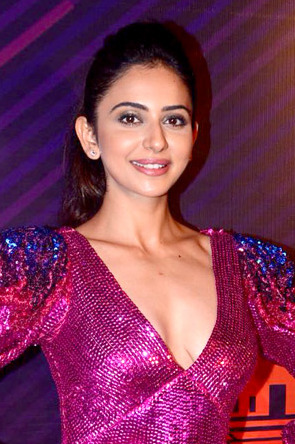
Samantha Ruth Prabhu (left) was initially considered for one of the female lead roles, but Rakul Preet Singh (right) ended up being engaged for the same.

Post the release of 1: Nenokkadine (2014) and before the release of Lingaa (2014), its female leads Kriti Sanon and Sonakshi Sinha were rumored to sign this film as the female leads. Shruti Haasan was approached in late July 2014 to play the female lead. Her inclusion was almost confirmed, considering her previous collaboration with Charan in Yevadu (2014). Both D. V. V. Danayya and Ram Charan reportedly insisted Vaitla to cast Prakash Raj in a crucial role with whom Vaitla had differences in the past. A source from the film's unit told Indo-Asian News Service on 1 January 2015 that Samantha Ruth Prabhu was finalised as one of the female leads and the second female lead was yet to be decided.

Vaitla was reported to abstain from casting Brahmanandam in this film making it his fourth film not featuring Brahmanandam after Nee Kosam (1999), Sontham (2002) and Anandamanandamaye (2004). Gopimohan later confirmed Brahmanandam's inclusion in the film adding that the character written for him would be one of the highlights of the film. Vaitla reportedly wanted to re-shoot Brahmanandam's scenes with N. Santhanam for the Tamil dubbed version similar to the act of S. S. Rajamouli for the casting of Eega (2012) as Chiranjeevi suggested to replace Brahmanandam with Santhanam.

Samantha was replaced by Rakul Preet Singh at the same time. While the lack of dates to accommodate was cited as one reason, budgetary reasons were cited as the other reason. Vaitla considered Ramya Krishnan, Tulasi and Jeevitha from Telugu cinema and also searched for yesteryear heroines in Tamil and Kannada cinema for the role of Charan's mother which was very crucial for the film's story. Kriti Kharbanda made a comeback to Telugu cinema with this film after the makers narrated her character sketch and the film's story. The second female lead was yet to be finalised. Nadhiya and Kashmera Shah were confirmed as a part of the film's cast in early June 2015. Impressed by his performance in Velaiilla Pattadhari (2014), the makers cast Amitash Pradhaan to play a supporting role marking his Telugu debut. Similarly, Tamil actor Arun Vijay was chosen to play the film's lead antagonist making his debut in Telugu after the makers were impressed with his performance in Yennai Arindhaal. Brahmaji's inclusion in the film's cast was confirmed in late June 2015. Rao Ramesh confirmed his inclusion in the film's cast in early August 2015 before leaving for Bangkok for the film's shoot. Days later, Prudhviraj confirmed his inclusion in the film's cast. On 20 August 2015, Vaitla confirmed that Chiranjeevi would make a cameo appearance in the film. He added that Chiranjeevi would appear for fifteen minutes in the film. Tisca Chopra was signed to play a supporting role marking her debut in Telugu cinema.

=== Characters ===
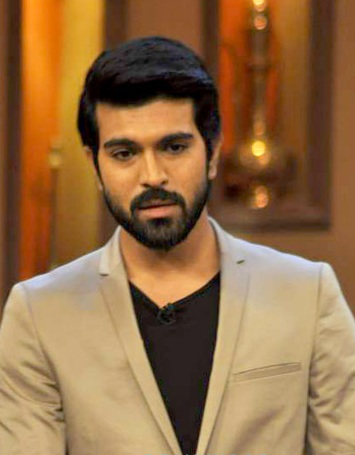
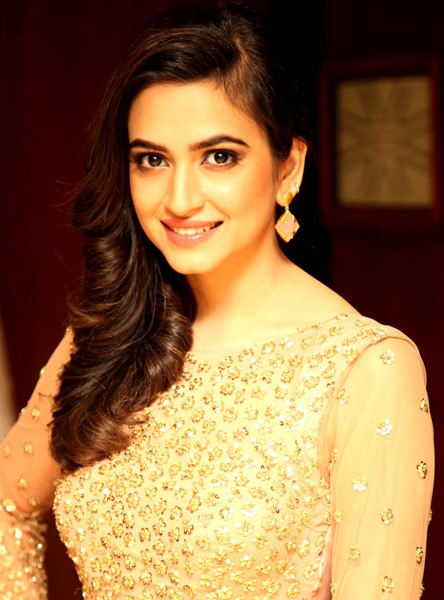
While Ram Charan (left) plays the role of an action choreographer, Kriti Kharbandha (right) plays his sister, a courageous girl-next-door.

Charan hired Priyanka Chopra's trainer Samir Jaura in mid-July 2014 to get into shape for this film by following an intensive training program designed by Jaura lasting for four-five months along with a strict diet. Jaura reached Hyderabad and accompanied Charan to the film sets where he worked out before or after the shoot of Govindudu Andarivadele (2014). Vaitla said in an interview that he wanted to put Charan's comic skills to the fore with this film, adding that the film would have a "good blend of humour and punch dialogues".

He was later confirmed to be seen as an action choreographer sporting a rugged look for which he had to shed weight by following a tough fitness regimen for four hours a day at his farmhouse in Bangalore. For further training, he left to Bangkok in mid April 2015 where he trained with Jaika stunt team. Action choreographer Kecha Khamphakdee supervised his training which consisted mainly of mixed martial arts. Videos showing Charan's kick boxing training sessions were released by Jaika Stunt team on 23 April 2015. He also began learning Karate for his role since mid May 2015. For the role, he sported a tattoo of Bruce Lee on his hand.

Kriti Kharbanda was signed in on to play Charan's sister in the film. Danayya said that her character would be an important one in the film. She said in an interview that she would play a courageous girl-next-door and added that she was asked by Vaitla to be herself and extremely talkative. Vaitla envisioned a middle aged woman running a manufacturing firm as Charan's mother in the film. Amitash Pradhan was signed to play a businessman. While Nadhiya plays his mother, Kriti would play his love interest. He added that his role would be a positive one, unlike his character in Velaiyilla Pattathari. Brahmaji would play the role of a lead actor sporting different attires throughout the film to whom Charan would be seen as a body double sporting the same attires. Arun Vijay called his character a powerful one and would sport a stylish look. Rao Ramesh played the role of Charan's father in the film. During the promotions of Kick 2 (2015), Rakul Preet Singh said that she would play the role of a graphic designer in this film. Chopra was signed to play the role of a "strong woman, a very wealthy and stylish one at that".

=== Crew ===
Vaitla was rumored to collaborate with the writer duo Kona Venkat-Gopimohan for this film with whom he had differences in the past. Kona Venkat-Gopimohan were working on the film's script in United States in late November 2014. S. Thaman and Sameer Reddy were reported to be the music director and cinematographer of the film respectively. Kona Venkat confirmed that he would be working with Vaitla again for this film after Charan convinced him to put aside their personal differences adding that he discussed the script with Vaitla and got an approval from Charan.

Gopimohan confirmed the same adding that this film's script would have no traces of their past works. Anirudh Ravichander was signed in on to compose the film's music marking his debut in Telugu cinema and also making this film the third Charan's film to have music composed by a Tamil music composer. (Note: Harris Jayaraj and Yuvan Shankar Raja composed music for Charan's films Orange (2010) and Govindudu Andarivadele (2014) in the past respectively.) He met Charan at his house in Hyderabad in early February 2015 and Danayya, Vaitla and others were also present during the meeting. He accepted to be a part of the film after liking the film's script.

Manoj Paramahamsa was signed in on as the film's director of photography. The makers announced that Kona Venkat would pen the dialogues and co-write the film's script along with Gopimohan while Vaitla himself would pen the film's screenplay. Anirudh walked out of the project in late March 2015 and was subsequently replaced by S. Thaman who collaborated with Vaitla for Dookudu (2011), Baadshah (2013) and Aagadu (2014). Thaman confirmed the same through his Twitter page later.

=== Filming ===
Principal photography began on 16 March 2015 at Hyderabad and the film's principal cast participated in the shoot. In late April 2015, Rakul Preet Singh's manager told media that she has allotted 15 days per month for the upcoming three months for this film's shoot. Charan was reported to join the film's sets on 27 April 2015 after returning from Bangkok. That schedule was dropped and a fresh schedule began from 21 May 2015 to shoot two duets on Charan and Rakul Preet Singh in Spain till 30 May 2015. The next schedule began from 3 June 2015 at Hydeabad which was announced last till the completion of the film's shoot.

Initially, few action sequences were shot in the Old City area of Hyderabad. On 15 June 2015, Charan revealed through his official Facebook page that filming of two songs, interval fight sequences and a few scenes have been completed till then. After a month, the makers revealed that 40% of the film's shoot is complete. Filming continued at Bangkok where crucial scenes on the film's principal cast were shot till 12 August 2015. The next schedule began at Hyderabad from the next day. The song "Mega Meter" was shot at Hyderabad in late September 2015. Charan participated in the song's shoot for 17 hours continuously and despite being injured in her back while rehearsing, Rakul Preet Singh completed her portions in the song in three days.

By then, the film's principal photography was wrapped up except for two songs and patchwork. Post-production activities were carried out in tandem. Chiranjeevi joined the film's sets on 3 September 2014, and completed filming for his cameo appearance in three days. Charan and Rakul Preet Singh participated in the shoot of the song "Bruce Lee" for 24 hours continuously. Upon its completion, principal photography was wrapped up on 10 August 2014. By then, Charan completed dubbing for his character in the film's first half and completed the rest in two days. The film was shot in 110 working days with 15 working hours per day, thus turning the fastest big budget Telugu film featuring a big star cast in the recent times.

== Music ==
The film's soundtrack is composed by S. Thaman and featured five tracks with lyrics written by Sri Mani and Ramajogayya Sastry. The soundtrack album was marketed by Zee Music Company in their Telugu debut, and was released on 16 September 2014 at a launch event held in Hitex Convention Centre in Madhapur, Hyderabad. The album received mostly positive reviews from critics.

== Marketing ==
The teaser trailer of the film was released on 21 August 2014, coinciding the eve of Chiranjeevi's birthday, without revealing the film's title and was released with the tentative title #RC9. The makers revealed the title as Bruce Lee: The Fighter and the poster of the film was unveiled on 28 August 2014.

On 26 August 2014, Srinu Vaitla unveiled two posters, through his official Twitter account. The first poster features Ram Charan Teja's stunt seen as holding guns in both the hands and chasing someone, while the second poster of "Bruce Lee" features lead couple - Ram Charan Teja and Rakul Preet Singh, featured in the picture taken from a song sequence. The theatrical trailer of the film was unveiled on 16 September 2014, during the film's audio launch.

== Release ==
=== Distribution ===
Dil Raju bought the theatrical rights in the Nizam region for ₹12.85 crore. Ceded rights were sold to Brahma Films for ₹8.10 crore. The Vizag theatrical rights were sold to Sri Kanthi Krishan Films for ₹5.40 crore. Godavari East and West rights were sold for Anushri Films and Aditya Films for ₹2.50 crore and ₹2.60 crore respectively. S Creations bought the theatrical rights for ₹6.75 crore and released in the Krishna and Guntur regions. Hari Films bought the theatrical rights for ₹1.90 crore in the Nellore region, thus the makers spent ₹40.85 crore on theatrical rights in the Andhra Pradesh and Telangana regions. The film's Karnataka rights were sold to Ramu Films for ₹6.75 crore. Bhadrakali Films bought the distribution rights for Tamil Nadu (also for its Tamil dubbed version) for ₹2 crore. Remya Films bought the Kerala rights for ₹0.5 crore and rest of India rights were sold to ₹0.6 crore. The overseas theatrical distribution rights were acquired by Great India Films in mid July 2015, for a price of ₹6 crore. The film made a pre-release business of ₹73 crore, and inclusive of the satellite rights and with theatrical rights of the film being sold for ₹56 crore.

=== Theatrical ===
Danayya planned to release the film on 15 October 2015, a week ahead of the Dusherra festival, which falls on 22 October 2015. The film was speculated to clash with Mahesh Babu-starrer and Brahmotsavam and Nandamuri Balakrishna-starrer Dictator. On 8 September 2015, Danayya confirmed 16 October 2015 as the film's release date. Due to a few action sequences, the film was passed with a U/A certificate instead of a U certificate by the Central Board of Film Certification.

Bruce Lee: The Fighter opened up in more than 2000 screens across the world, with 1200 screens across Andhra Pradesh and Telangana, On 14 October, Ram Charan hosted a special premiere for 400 visually impaired children at the Prasad IMAX multiplex in Hyderabad. It was simultaneously released in Tamil under the title Bruce Lee 2, and in Malayalam under the same name. It was dubbed in Hindi under the title Bruce Lee.

Bruce Lee opened in more than 360 centres in the overseas region (US, Canada, Australia, New Zealand, UK, Europe, Middle East, Tokyo, Kenya, Tanzania, Uganda, South Africa, Botswana, Singapore, Malaysia, Thailand) and in more than 500 screens. In US the film released about more than 202 locations and more than 360 theatres. The premiere shows of Bruce Lee was held in US on 15 October.

=== Home media ===
The television broadcast rights of the original and Hindi dubbed versions were acquired by Zee Cinema. The film's premiere took place on Zee Telugu on 14 February 2016. The satellite rights of the Malayalam version were given to Zee Keralam. The satellite rights of the Tamil dubbed version went to Star Vijay.

== Reception ==
=== Critical response ===
Bruce Lee: The Fighter received negative reviews from critics. Sangeetha Devi Dundoo of The Hindu wrote "Ram Charan dances like a dream, as always, and shows marked improvement as an actor. But what he needs is a project that will not belittle the huge fan base in the garb of masala. When the entire antagonist track opens with an illogical act, probably one shouldn't expect much." Writing for The Times of India, Karthik Pasupulate gave 3 out of 5 and wrote "The film is a bit melodrama and sadly the gags turn out to be the dampener. There is a surfeit of funny characters as well. How much you'll love this film depends on how big Chiranjeevi fan you are." Writing for India Today, Kirubhakar Purushothaman gave 2.5 out of 5 stars and wrote "There are films which exactly pan out in a way you predict they would, without any disarray, and still they don't disappoint you. Bruce Lee The Fighter fits that bill". A critic from Sify gave 3 out of 5 stars stating "Chiranjeevi appearing in the climax in his real life character of a movie star, Charan dancing like a dream in songs, and a decent first half are the only saving grace of this run-of-the-mill movie." Bangalore Mirror noted that it "Bruce Lee-The Fighter is strictly passable fare where Srinu Vaitla fails to really entertain us convincingly" giving it a 2.5 out of 5. Behindwoods gave 2.75 out of 5 stating "Bruce Lee-The fighter would have been a lot more original and different, If the director had not adhered to the age old model of commercial cinema and capitalized more on the action part, but due to the situational based comedy, non-exaggerated climax, Srinu delivers another winner that is sure to entertain."

=== Box office ===
Bruce Lee: The Fighter collected more than ₹20 crore, on its opening day, registering the highest opening day collection of Charan's film. The film collected more than ₹39.10 crore gross at the worldwide box office in the first weekend, and a share of ₹22 crore to its distributors. At the end of seven days, the film collected more than ₹77 crore gross, and a share of ₹27.30 crore. The film lost majority of screens due to the release of Kanche, which received a strong word of mouth upon its initial release. Within 10-days, the film earned a share of ₹38.29 crore, with a gross of ₹55.55 crore. The film was a commercial failure.
