= East Godavari district (1925–2022) =

East Godavari
- Former District of Andhra Pradesh
- 1925–2022
- Capital: Kakinada
- Area
  - 2011: 12,805 km^{2} (4,944 sq mi)
- Population
  - 2011 Census: 5,154,296
- Government
- District Headquarters
  - 1925–2022: Kakinada
- History
  - District established: 1925
  - District reorganized: 4 April 2022
Preceded by
Godavari District
Succeeded by
Kakinada district
Konaseema district
East Godavari district

East Godavari, retrospectively referred to as the United East Godavari, and Undivided East Godavari, was a district in the Coastal Andhra region of Andhra Pradesh, India. The district headquarters was located in Kakinada. It was the most populous district in Andhra Pradesh, with a population of 5,154,296 as per the 2011 Census. Kakinada and Rajamahendravaram were the major cities of the district.

The district's origins date back to 1823, during British rule, when the District of Rajamahendravaram was created within the Madras Presidency. In 1859, it was reorganized to form the Godavari and Krishna districts. Rajamahendravaram served as the headquarters of the Godavari district until 1925, when it was bifurcated into East Godavari and West Godavari districts. Kakinada became the headquarters of East Godavari, while Eluru became the headquarters of West Godavari.

In 1959, the Bhadrachalam revenue division, including Bhadrachalam and Naguru taluqs, was transferred from East Godavari to Khammam district. However, after the reorganization of Andhra Pradesh in 2014, several mandals, including Chinturu and Kunavaram, were returned to East Godavari.

On April 4, 2022, East Godavari district was reorganized to create three new districts: Kakinada, Konaseema, and East Godavari, with their respective headquarters at Kakinada, Amalapuram, and Rajamahendravaram.
