= Aagadu =

2014 Indian film by Srinu Vaitla

- Theatrical release poster
- Directed by: Srinu Vaitla
- Screenplay by: Srinu Vaitla; Anil Ravipudi; Upendra Madhav; Praveen Varma
- Dialogues by: Srinu Vaitla
- Story by: Srinu Vaitla; Upendra Madhav
- Produced by: Ram Achanta; Gopichand Achanta; Anil Sunkara
- Starring: Mahesh Babu; Tamannaah Bhatia; Sonu Sood
- Cinematography: K. V. Guhan
- Edited by: M. R. Varma
- Music by: Thaman S
- Production company: 14 Reels Entertainment
- Distributed by: Eros International
- Release date: 19 September 2014
- Running time: 165 minutes
- Country: India
- Language: Telugu
- Budget: ₹65 crore

Aagadu (transl. He won’t stop) is a 2014 Indian Telugu-language action comedy film directed by Srinu Vaitla. Written by Anil Ravipudi, Upendra Madhav and Praveen Varma, the film was jointly produced by Ram Achanta, Gopi Achanta and Anil Sunkara under their banner 14 Reels Entertainment. It stars Mahesh Babu, Tamannaah Bhatia and Sonu Sood in lead roles while Rajendra Prasad, Ashish Vidyarthi, Nassar, and Brahmanandam play supporting roles.

Aagadu was Thaman S's 50th film as a music composer, with K. V. Guhan as the cinematographer and M. R. Varma as the editor. Mahesh played Shankar, an encounter specialist who becomes the circle inspector of police in Bukkapatnam. He is tasked with stopping the power plant construction by Damodar (Sonu Sood), a crime boss, due to its environmental impact. Shankar later learns that Damodar is responsible for his brother Bharath's death, leading him to seek revenge.

Principal photography for Aagadu began on 28 November 2013 and concluded on 5 September 2014. Most of the film was shot in and around Hyderabad, with additional locations including Mumbai, Gujarat, Ballari and Kerala. Some song sequences were filmed in Ladakh, Switzerland and Ooty, in addition to Hyderabad and Bellary. The post-production phase lasted for 50 days and was completed on 16 September 2014. Aagadu was theatrically released worldwide on 19 September 2014. The film received mixed reviews and was a box office bomb.

== Plot ==
Shankar, an orphan is raised by a sincere police officer Raja Ram. When Raja's son Bharath accidentally kills a kid, Shankar takes the blame for him. Shankar is imprisoned, and Raja warns him not to meet him again. After graduating, Shankar is employed as a circle inspector of police. He is popularly referred to as "Encounter" Shankar because of his track record as an encounter specialist.

Shankar is transferred to Bukkapatnam town in Tadipatri, Anantapur district. He is assigned the task of halting the illegal businesses of Damodar, an influential crime boss whose dream project is to build a power plant. Using his wits, Shankar destroys all the three main businesses of Damodar by befriending and trapping their respective in-charges: Lion Seenu, Ferocious Firangee and Super Sampangi. The three become Shankar's allies in the aftermath. He brings a stay on the power project by bringing a few vital witnesses before the court of law, thereby earning Damodar's ire. On a parallel note, Shankar loves a sweet shop owner named Saroja who reciprocates his feelings at a later point of time.

A person named Shekhar approaches Shankar, and through him, he informs Mallikarjuna Rao, the local Superintendent of Police, that he is the witness of the murder of environmentalist Prakash by Damodar. Damodar influences all the witnesses including Shekhar before Shankar could arrest him. He later learns that Raja's son Bharath's past.

Past: Bharath, was the previous district collector. Bharath tried to stop the power project.Damodar held half of the share in the project whilst Mallikarjuna and central minister Nagaraju held the remaining half share. Before committing suicide, Bharath revealed the truth behind Shankar's imprisonment to Raja and unites them.

Present: After learning this Shankar seeks revenge, and with the help of a lawyer named Database Donayya, he gathers information regarding the power broker of this project named Delhi Suri, Mallikarjuna and Damodar's conservative girlfriend named Sukanya, who actually wa s an actress working in risqué films in the past.By trapping initially and blackmailing later, Shankar gets hold of Delhi Suri with whose help, he creates a rift between Damodar and Nagaraju which leads to the latter's murder. By blackmailing Sukanya, they trap Mallikarjuna with her help and accuse him of attempting sexual assault on Sukanya. However, Mallikarjuna comes out of the closet and reveals that he is gay and was believed by none. He is murdered by poisoning.Damodar's brother Durga is killed by Damodar himself after Shankar pollutes his mind accusing Durga for an attack on Damodar's life. Meanwhile, Shankar and Saroja get engaged. Delhi Suri learns about Donayya and destroys his office. Donayya takes revenge by revealing Delhi Suri's role in the murders of the three people to Damodar. When Damodar tries to kill Delhi Suri, he is confronted by Shankar who kills him after a duel. Bharath receives posthumous recognition for his honesty, while Delhi Suri turns a police informer working under Shankar.

== Cast ==
- Mahesh Babu as CI G. Shankar alias "Encounter" Shankar
- Tamannaah Bhatia as Saroja
- Sonu Sood as Damodar
- Rajendra Prasad as CI G. Raja Ram
- Ashish Vidyarthi as SP Mallikarjuna Rao IPS
- Nassar as SI D. Dakshina Murthy
- Brahmanandam as Delhi Suri
- M. S. Narayana as Adv. Database Donayya
- Posani Krishna Murali as Super Sampangi
- Raghu Babu as Ferocious Firangee
- Ajay as IAS Bharath
- Vennela Kishore as T. Prabakar
- Tanikella Bharani as Adi Keshava, Saroja's father
- Rao Ramesh as police commissioner
- Sameer Hasan As Ram Prasad
- Brahmaji as Constable Chandra Sekhar
- Vineet Kumar as Minister Nagaraju
- Ravi Prakash as Bharath's brother-in-law
- Shatru as Durga, Damodar's brother
- Saptagiri as Indian Raju
- Chatrapathi Sekhar as Shekhar
- Prabhas Sreenu as Lion Seenu
- Mumtaj as Sukanya / Belly Lilly
- Karuna Bhushan as Rekha, Bharath's wife
- Bharath Reddy as Prakash, human rights officer
- Prudhvi Raj as Veera Keshava, Saroja's uncle
- Harsha Vardhan as Channa Keshava, Saroja's uncle
- Sravan as undercover police officer
- Raghu Karumanchi as Constable Biriyani Raju
- Satyam Rajesh as doctor
- Chitram Srinu as thief
- Prabhakar as Bihar goon
- Besant Ravi as Tiger David
- Gautam Raju as Groom's father
- Rajitha as Groom's mother
- Shakalaka Shankar as thief

Cameo appearance

- Shruti Haasan in the song "Junction Lo"

== Production ==
=== Origin and casting ===
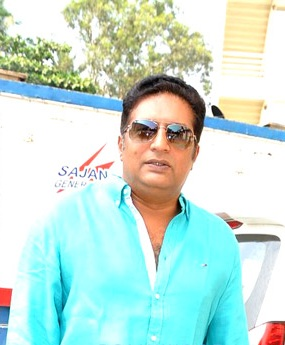
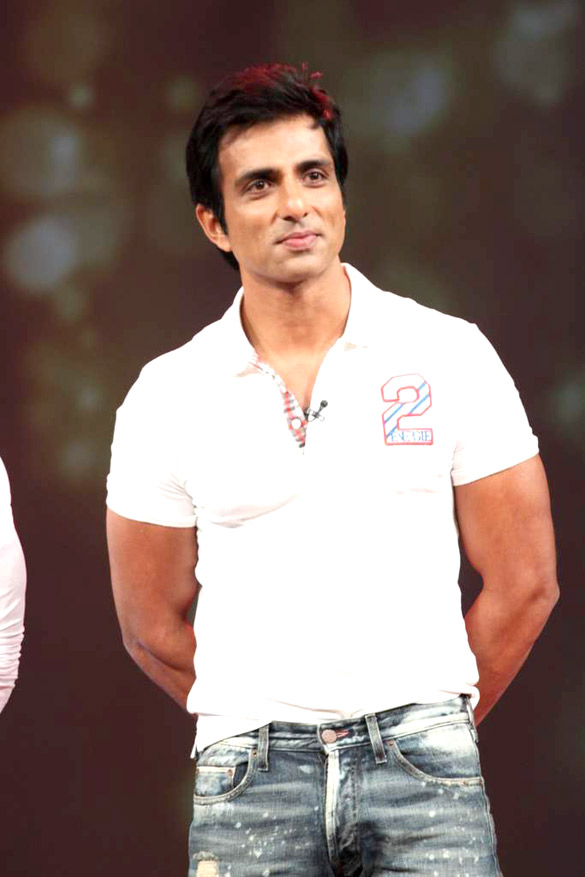
Prakash Raj (left) was initially signed as the film's antagonist. He was replaced with Sonu Sood (right) due to his creative differences with Vaitla.

On the first anniversary of Dookudu (2011), its producers Ram Achanta, Gopi Achanta and Anil Sunkara announced on 23 September 2012 that they would bankroll a film featuring Mahesh Babu as the protagonist and directed by Srinu Vaitla under their banner 14 Reels Entertainment. Gopimohan chose to work with new writers for developing the film's script further. Mahesh supported his decision, stating that this change would make the audience experience freshness and discover something new. Vaitla wanted to narrate a character-driven story with entertainment as priority. Aagadu was confirmed as the film's title in July 2013.

The core technical crew of Dookudu were retained for Aagadu as well. Thaman S was signed to compose the music, which marked his 50th film as a music composer. K. V. Guhan and A. S. Prakash were chosen as the film's director of photography and art director respectively. M. R. Varma edited the film. The official launch ceremony of the film, initially planned on 16 October 2013, was postponed to 25 October 2013 by paying respect to Srihari who succumbed to liver cancer on 9 October 2013. The film was officially launched at Ramanaidu Studios with filmmakers D. Ramanaidu and Shyam Prasad Reddy attending the ceremony as the guests of honour.

Mahesh played the role of Shankar, an encounter specialist similar to the one he played in Dookudu. This was the third time Mahesh played the role of a police officer in his career after Pokiri and Dookudu. Tamannaah Bhatia was signed as the female lead, and she played the role of a local sweet shop owner. She sported a traditional attire for her look in the film. Rajendra Prasad was chosen to play Mahesh's father in the film. Prakash Raj was selected to play a negative role in the film. He was later replaced with Sonu Sood due to his creative differences with Vaitla. Brahmaji played the role of an honest police constable. Shruti Haasan performed an item number in the film which was the first of her other similar special appearances. Brahmanandam was signed to play a supporting role. He performed a spoof of Yamadonga (2007), Racha (2012), Legend (2014) and Race Gurram (2014). Mahesh performed a spoof on the game show Meelo Evaru Koteeswarudu.

=== Filming ===
Principal photography commenced on 28 November 2013 at Hyderabad. Tamannaah joined the film's sets on 12 December 2013. A village set resembling Tadipatri was erected in Gujarat for the film's shoot to avoid local interference from crowds that would ensue if shot in Andhra Pradesh, where Mahesh is a star. Few key scenes including a fight sequence were shot at Nanakramguda in a large set. The next schedule stated at Ballari from 23 February 2014. Mahesh did not suffer any injuries during the film's shoot at Bellary, but took rest due to the stress he underwent. Filming continued at Hyderabad from 10 March 2014. Some comedy scenes were filmed on the principal cast. Few scenes were filmed at the Mount Opera in Hyderabad. Scenes featuring Mahesh, Prasad and Sood were filmed in early April 2014.

The film's flashback scenes were being shot at Chiran Fort Club in Hyderabad till 11 April 2014. The makers preferred Hyderabad to Jammu and Kashmir and Rajasthan for the remaining portions and 70% of the shoot was completed by late April 2014. After filming few portions at Ramoji Film City, the next schedule commenced at Ladakh on 20 May 2014. On its completion, majority of the film's shoot was wrapped up. After completion of the shoot there, filming continued at Ramoji Film City and Mumbai in June 2014. Some crucial scenes on Mahesh, Sood, and others were filmed there. The next schedule was planned in Bellary and Kerala from 22 June 2014. After its completion, the next schedule commenced in Hyderabad from 6 July 2014.

Some key scenes were filmed on Mahesh, Tamannaah, Sood and Brahmanandam in Hyderabad till 18 July 2014. The intermission action sequences featuring Mahesh, Sood and others were filmed at Ramoji Film City from the next day. The climax sequences were shot in August 2014 on Mahesh and other supporting cast at Rachakonda near Ramoji Film City. The remaining part of the climax sequences, including an action sequence on Mahesh and Sood, was filmed at the hilly areas in Ramoji Film City. After completing the schedule at Europe on 25 August 2014, the unit returned to Hyderabad three days later. Principal photography ended on 5 September 2014 at Ooty.

=== Song sequences ===
The song "Aagadu" was filmed on Mahesh and few dancers at the Jindal Steel Factory, Bellary in October 2013. This became the first Telugu film to be shot there and also made the factory a notable location for the song shoots of Kannada films such as Rana Vikrama (2015), Ranna (2015), and Mr. Airavata (2015). Both the song and fight sequences were filmed in 23 days. Mahesh and the members of the film's unit had fallen sick and continued work using antibiotics. Mahesh called it the "most strenuous schedule I went through in my life", and added, "For every shot, they had to get the dust up to get the right visual. Room kocchi snanam chesthe (English: After bathing in the room) I would see only mud. It’s very dangerous".

The song "Bhelpuri" was filmed on the lead pair near Pangong Tso, Ladakh in May 2014 under the supervision of choreographer Dinesh. Few portions were filmed at Leh for ten days with great difficulty under the supervision of choreographer Prem Rakshith. Tamannaah called it "one of the most difficult songs I have ever done", adding that it is a "full on dance number, unlike a song in which you are walking away and looking pretty". During the shoot, the car used by Vaitla and his team got stuck in the Nubra for seven hours. The manager lost his voice and the others developed severe headaches. The song was filmed for ten days at that altitude and Vaitla flew 300 people in a flight for the same.

The song "Junction Lo" was filmed on Mahesh and Haasan in a specially erected set at Ramoji Film City. It was choreographed by Rakshith and was wrapped up on 31 July 2014. Apart from Brahmanandam, 60 background dancers participated in the song's shoot. The song "Nari Nari" and a part of the song "Aaja Saroja" were filmed on Mahesh and Tamannaah at Switzerland. A motion control equipment weighing 800 kilograms was transported from Amsterdam to Switzerland for the shoot of the latter. When the Italian crew refused to come because of the weather in Switzerland, Vaitla filmed parts of the song at the hills and the waterfalls. The remaining portion of the song "Aaja Saroja" was filmed at Ooty, on whose completion the film's principal photography was wrapped up.

=== Post-production ===
Post-production phase was scheduled to be wrapped up in 50 days. On 19 May 2014, a puja commemorated the beginning of the film's dubbing at Hyderabad. The supporting cast of the film completed dubbing for their parts in late August 2014, and Mahesh began dubbing for his role after returning from Europe. The dubbing was completed on 10 September 2014. Aagadu was passed with an 'U/A' certificate by the Central Board of Film Certification in mid September 2014. All the remaining post-production activities, including the final mixing, were wrapped up by 16 September 2014.

== Music ==
Thaman S composed the film's music, which marked his 50th film as a music director. Bhaskarabhatla penned the lyrics for four of the six songs in the soundtrack album, with Sri Mani penning the lyrics for one song and another one being a mashup of the film's dialogues. Haasan provided vocals for the song "Junction Lo" which happens to be the item number she performed in the film. Lahari Music marketed the film's soundtrack. Director S. Shankar unveiled the soundtrack album of the film on 15 August 2014 at Shilpakala Vedika in Hyderabad. The soundtrack opened to positive reception from critics as well as audience and was commercially successful.

== Marketing ==
The prologue of the film was criticised by Pawan Kalyan's fans for its similarities with Gabbar Singh (2012). Also, the dialogue, "Prathodu pululu, simhalu, enugulu, elakalatho yedhava comparisons. Elaparam ochestundi" (English: Everyone is comparing themselves to tigers, lions, elephants and rats. It's quite irritating) was considered by a section of the audience as a satire on the popular dialogues of other films. After the teaser's release, the fans of Mahesh and Kalyan had a verbal fight on the social platforms, with the latter calling it a "sequel to Gabbar Singh". Addressing the controversy, Mahesh later clarified that it is not personal in any way and is the "attitude of the character that is being portrayed on screen".

As a part of the film's promotion, a statewide contest named "Meelo Evaru Superstar SUPER SuperFan" was launched on 25 August 2014. Few Mahesh's fans were selected from Visakhapatnam, Vijayawada, Khammam, Warangal, Tirupati and Kurnool from 25—27 August. They played a specially designed game on Mahesh and his films and the one who answered most of the answers correctly was identified and shortlisted in each centre. Twelve people selected in this way were invited to the audio launch. These twelve played a game there and the winner was crowned by Mahesh himself as the "Superstar SUPER Superfan" with a special gift. A special train named "Superstar Express" was decorated with the film's posters. It travelled from Secunderabad to Vishakhapatnam.

The makers unfolded "The Aagadu belt" on 17 September 2014 at Vishakhapatnam in the presence of Mahesh's fans, important dignitaries, officials from local police and people who held the belt to create a record for the world's longest police belt. Few specially created promotional kits were distributed to Mahesh's fans there.

== Release ==
=== Theatrical ===
Aagadu was released on 19 September 2014 in 2000 screens across the globe. Eros International acquired the film's global distribution rights. Owing to Mahesh's popularity there, the makers offered to screen Aagadu in every university there and in other countries, if there are more than 100 students willing to watch the film. Efforts were made to release the film across the United States with subtitles.

Aagadu was released in 100 screens across countries like Australia, United Kingdom, Switzerland, United Arab Emirates, etc. The premieres in United States were held on 18 September 2014. It had a record release of 110 screens across North India, and was screened at 6:00 AM in fifteen selected screens across Hyderabad on the release day. The Tamil-dubbed version, Idhu Dhaanda Police, was released on 15 December 2015. While, the Malayalam - dubbed version, Pokkiri Police, was released on 29 January 2016. It was later dubbed into Hindi as Encounter Shankar.

=== Home media ===
After the release of the prologue, Gemini TV acquired the satellite rights for ₹ 97.5 million, one of the highest amount ever paid for a Telugu film. The film had its global television premiere on 14 January 2015 on the eve of Pongal festival. It managed to get a TRP rating of 12.24, performing better than Mahesh's previous film 1: Nenokkadine on television.

== Reception ==
=== Critical response ===
The film received mixed response from critics.

Sangeetha Devi Dundoo of The Hindu called Aagadu a "simple, oft-repeated cop vs. don story", and added, "The difference here is the don is reduced to a cardboard. For a mind game to be interesting, both players need to be smart and second guess the opponent’s next move, which doesn’t happen here. If one is looking for gags, Aagadu offers them in plenty. But try an overdose of this formula and it could be tiring." Suresh Kavirayani of Deccan Chronicle gave the film three-and-a-half out of five stars and wrote, "Though this film has many similarities of Srinu Vaitla’s earlier films, but it’s Mahesh Babu who has the audience’s attention throughout. Watch it for him and more rely on him".

Karthik Pasupulate of The Times of India gave the film three out of five stars and called Aagadu "Dookudu 2.0" in operating system parlance. Pasupulate added that it seems more like a remake of Dookudu with a "much louder Mahesh Babu, more banal jokes, and a few superficial twists in the screenplay", and that the end product is "more slapstick than funny".

Rajitha S. of The New Indian Express wrote, "In spite of an entertaining first half, Aagadu fizzles out in the second half and makes for an ordinary affair". Sify commented that Vaitla "has thrown the script of this film to the winds" and "relies on comedy, but at times it's too much", concluding that Aagadu "doesn't pass the muster" and is "definitely not a heavy weight film".

=== Box office ===
Aagadu grossed ₹18.02 crore within its first two days. However, it underperformed at the box office, failing to recover its budget of ₹65 crore during its theatrical run. The film's failure was primarily attributed to its similarities with Dookudu and other successful Telugu films. The increased budget also contributed to its downfall, with Mahesh and Vaitla receiving remunerations of ₹18 crore and ₹12 crore respectively. Mahesh later acknowledged the film's failure and called it a "mistake". He added, "We were very excited during the scripting stage, and had envisioned it very differently. But unfortunately, things panned out differently. Perhaps, it's an error of judgement".
