= List of Tamil films of 2011 =

Prior to the amendment of Tamil Nadu Entertainments Tax Act 1939 on 27 September 2011, gross was 115 per cent of Nett for films with non-Tamil titles. Post-amendment, gross jumped to 130 per cent of net for films with non-Tamil titles and U certificates as well. Commercial Taxes Department disclosed ₹59.43 crore in entertainment tax revenue for the year.

The following is a list of films produced in the Tamil cinema in India that were released in 2011.

== Box office collection ==
Rank	Film	Worldwide gross
1	Mankatha	₹130 Crore
2	7aum Arivu	₹90 Crore
3	Kaavalan	₹70 Crore
4	Velayudham	₹67 Crore
5	Kanchana	₹60 Crore
6	Ko	₹55 Crore
7	Siruthai	₹50 Crore
8	Aadukalam	₹40 Crore
9	Deiva Thirumagal	₹30 Crore
10	Engeyum Eppodhum	₹15-20 Crore

== List of released films ==
=== January – June ===
Opening		Title	Director	Actors	Genre	Notes	Ref
J A N	7	Thamizh Desam	Thamizh Selva	Raghuvannan, Varshini	Drama		
J A N	14	Aadukalam	Vetrimaran	Dhanush, Taapsee Pannu, Kishore	Drama	Produced by Five Star Films	
J A N	14	Siruthai	Siva	Karthi, Tamannaah	Action, masala	Produced by Studio Green	
J A N	15	Ilaignan	Suresh Krishna	Pa. Vijay, Remya Nambeesan, Meera Jasmine, Namitha	Drama	Produced by Martin Production	
J A N	15	Kaavalan	Siddique	Vijay, Asin, Mithra Kurian	Romantic comedy	Produced by Ekaveera Creations	
J A N	15	Sollitharava	S. Sivaraman	Sivan, Sharmila, Nivedhita	Romance	Produced by Foot Steps Production	
J A N	28	Pathinaaru	D. Sabapathy	Shiva, Madhu Shalini	Romantic drama	Produced by Passion Movie Makers	
J A N	28	Pazhagiyathe Pirivatharka	S. A. Selvakumar	Selvam, Tharuna	Romance	Siva Jothi Films Banner	
J A N	28	Vaada Poda Nanbargal	Manigai	Nandha, Sharran Kumar, Yashika	Romance	Produced by 8 Point Entertainment	
F E B	4	Yuddham Sei	Myshkin	Cheran, Dipa Shah, Y. Gee. Mahendra	Crime thriller	Produced by AGS Entertainment	
F E B	4	Thoonga Nagaram	Gaurav	Vimal, Anjali, Bharani, Nishanth, Gaurav	Drama	Produced by Cloud Nine Movies	
F E B	11	Idhu Kadhal Uthirum Kaalam	P.K.Shivashri	T.Jayanraj, P.K.Shivashri	Romance		
F E B	11	Nandhi	Thamizhvanan	Akhil, Sanusha	Drama	Produced by Vision X Media	
F E B	11	Payanam	Radha Mohan	Nagarjuna, Prakash Raj, Sana Khan, Poonam Kaur	Thriller, drama	Produced by Silent Movies	
F E B	11	Thambikottai	Ammu Ramesh	Narain, Poonam Bajwa, Meena	Action, masala	Produced by Rajeshwari Films	
F E B	11	Varmam	A. S. Lawrence Madhavan	Akilan, Anaka, Nizhalgal Ravi	Crime thriller	Produced by Crescent Creations	
F E B	18	Aadu Puli	Vijay Prakash	Aadhi, Poorna, Prabhu	Action	Produced by Global Infotainments	
F E B	18	Nadunisi Naaygal	Gautham Vasudev Menon	Sameera Reddy, Veera Bahu	Psychological thriller	Produced by Photon Kathaas	
F E B	18	Thappu	Akilan	Vivan, Rani Chaturvedi, Jennifer	Adult	Produced by SSA Movies	
F E B	25	Aaranin Kaaval	K. Dharmaraj	Ajay, Sonia Bhat	Drama	Produced by Rogan Films	
F E B	25	Margazhi 16	K. Steven	Jayanth, Srinidhi	Romance	Produced by Jayavishal Arts	
F E B	25	Seedan	Subramaniya Siva	Ananya, Krishna, Dhanush	Drama	Produced by Mid Productions	
M A R	4	Singam Puli	Sai Ramani	Jiiva, Divya Spandana, Honey Rose	Action, masala	Produced by Silverline Film Factory	
M A R	11	Ayyan	Kendiran Muniyasamy	Vasan Karthik, Divya Padmini	Drama		
M A R	11	Bhavani	G. Kicha	Sneha, Kota Srinivasa Rao, Vivek	Action	Produced by Shri Movie Makers	
M A R	11	Aivar	Sai Prasad	Perarasan, Vijay Anand, Ilah, Athulya	Drama	Produced by AGR Night Films	
M A R	18	Lathika	Dr. Srinivasan	Dr. Srinivasan, Meenakshi Kailash, Rahman	Masala	Produced by Lathika Films	
M A R	18	Minsaram	N. Selvakumar	Yuvaraaj, Madhusantha, Thol. Thirumavalavan, Sowganthi	Romance	Produced by Kovai Film City	
M A R	18	Avargalum Ivargalum	Veera Pandian	Sathish, Vimal Natarajan, Aishwarya, Supraja, Agathiyan	Drama	Produced by Lakshika Films	
M A R	18	Muthukku Muthaaga	Rasu Madhuravan	Vikranth, Natty, Ilavarasu, Oviya, Monica, Saranya Ponvannan	Drama	Produced by Pandiyanadu Theatres	
M A R	25	Kullanari Koottam	Sribalaji	Vishnu Vishal, Remya Nambeesan	Romance		
M A R	25	Kumara	T. K. Shanmughasundaram	Ratheeshvaratha, Roopashree	Romance		
M A R	25	Padai Soozha	A. S. Prabhu	Ganesh Prasad, Prasad Raj, Varshini	Masala		
M A R	25	Sattapadi Kutram	S. A. Chandrasekhar	Sathyaraj, Vikranth, Bhanu, Harish Kalyan, Komal Sharma	Action		
M A R	25	Nil Gavani Sellathey	Anand K. Chakravarthy	Anand K. Chakravarthy, Jagan, Dhansika, Lakshmi Nair	Suspense thriller	Produced by Imagine Creations, Re-release	
A P R	1	Appavi	R. Raghuraj	Gautham, Suhani Kalita, K. Bhagyaraj	Drama	Produced by Chartered Arts	
A P R	1	Nanjupuram	Charles	Raaghav, Monica	Thriller, fantasy	Produced by Illusionz Infinite	
A P R	1	Thenkasi Pakkathula	A. Anthony	Ajay, Ashmitha	Drama	Produced by Classic Combines	
A P R	8	Mappillai	Suraj	Dhanush, Hansika Motwani, Manisha Koirala	Masala	Produced by Nemichand Jhabak	
A P R	9	Ponnar Shankar	Thyagarajan	Prashanth, Pooja Chopra, Divya Parameshwaran, Sneha, Khushbu, Prakash Raj, Jayaram	Epic	Produced by Lakshmi Shanthi Movies	
A P R	22	Ko	K. V. Anand	Jeeva, Karthika Nair, Ajmal, Piaa Bajpai	Thriller	Produced By RS Infotainment	
A P R	22	Vikadakavi	G. Krishnan	Sathish, Amala Paul	Romance	Produced by ABC Studious	
A P R	29	Kadhal Meipada	Ravi Aacharya	Vishnu Priyan, Madhumitha, Thalaivasal Vijay	Romance		
A P R	29	Vaanam	Krish	Silambarasan, Bharath, Anushka Shetty, Prakash Raj, Saranya	Action, drama	Produced by VTV Productions & Magic Box Pictures	
A P R	29	Poova Thalaiya	Sanjay Ram	Krishnakumar, Udhaya, Sherin, Megha Nair	Drama	Produced by Lingam Theatres	
M A Y	6	Engeyum Kadhal	Prabhu Deva	Jayam Ravi, Hansika Motwani	Romance	Produced by AGS Entertainment	
M A Y	6	Pasakkara Nanbargal	Firose Khan	Ajmal Khan, Divya Nagesh	Drama	Produced by Angel Film International	
M A Y	12	Azhagarsamiyin Kuthirai	Suseenthiran	Appukutty, Saranya Mohan, Advaitha	Comedy drama	Produced by Escape Artists Motion Pictures	
M A Y	14	Narthagi	G. Vijayabathma	Vivin, Swathi, Kalki, Leema Babu	Drama	Produced by SG Films	
M A Y	20	Kandaen	A. C. Mugil	Shanthnoo Bhagyaraj, Rashmi Gautham, Santhanam	Romantic comedy	Produced by Sri Sivaselvanayagiamman Movies	
M A Y	20	Maithanam	M. S. Sakthivel	M. A. Kennedy, Suresh Guru, Jyothi Raj, Swasika	Drama	Produced by Anjana Cinemas	
M A Y	20	Suttum Vizhi Sudare	Thilakar	Chandru, Vinith, Sushma, Priyashri, Jeeva	Romance	Produced by Nila Films	
M A Y	27	Eththan	L. Suresh	Vimal, Sanusha	Action	Produced by Sherali Films	
M A Y	27	Sabash Sariyana Potti	Venu Arvind	Jayaram, Sriram Karthik, Anjana Thamburatti, Deepa Narendra	Comedy	Produced by Dwaraka Movies	
J U N E	3	Aanmai Thavarael	D. Kuzhandai Velappan	Dhruvva, Shruthi, Sampath Raj	Crime thriller	Produced by Redhead Entertainment	
J U N E	3	Anbirkku Alavillai	Maryam Kassai, Anand S Babu	Sumeet Pathak, Neetu Chaudhury, Johnny Lever	Romantic drama	Produced by Shepherd India Media Private Limited	
J U N E	3	Oru Santhippil	A. Sridhar	M. S. Arulmani, Paveena	Adult	Produced by Tristar Movies	
J U N E	10	Aaranya Kaandam	Thiagarajan Kumararaja	Jackie Shroff, Ravi Krishna, Sampath Raj, Yasmin Ponnappa	Mob, neo-noir	Produced by Capital Film Works	
J U N E	10	Aasaipadugiren	Balu Manivannan	Sekhar, Gayathri	Romance		
J U N E	10	Shanthi Appuram Nithya	Murali Vishwa	Magha Aditya, Archna Sharma	Erotic thriller		
J U N E	17	Anaagarigam	Krishna Devan	Vibu, Prajwal Poovaiah, Vagitha, Rishikesh, Bobbylona	Erotic		
J U N E	17	Avan Ivan	Bala	Arya, Vishal, Janani Iyer, Madhu Shalini	Comedy drama	Produced by AGS Entertainment	
J U N E	24	Pillaiyar Theru Kadaisi Veedu	Thirumalai Kishore	Jithan Ramesh, Sanchita Padukone, Suhasini	Romance, action	Produced by Super Good Films	
J U N E	24	Udhayan	Chaplin	Arulnithi, Pranitha Subhash	Action	Produced by Muthamizh Padaippagam	
J U N E	25	Nootrenbadhu	P. Jayendra	Siddharth, Priya Anand, Nithya Menen	Romantic drama	Produced by SPI Cinemas & Aghal Films	

=== July – December ===
Opening		Title	Director	Cast	Genre	Notes	Ref
J U L Y	1	Arumbu Meesai Kurumbu Paarvai	Vetri Veeran	Chandru, Jayanthi	Romance	Produced by New Line Talkies	
J U L Y	1	Theneer Viduthi	S. S. Kumaran	Adith Arun, Reshmi Menon	Romance	Produced by Peacock Pictures	
J U L Y	7	Venghai	Hari	Dhanush, Tamannaah Bhatia, Rajkiran	Masala	Produced by Vijaya Productions	
J U L Y	15	Deiva Thirumagal	A. L. Vijay	Vikram, Anushka Shetty, Amala Paul, Baby Sara	Drama	Produced by Rajakaliamman Medias	
J U L Y	22	Kanchana	Raghava Lawrence	Raghava Lawrence, R. Sarathkumar, Lakshmi Rai	Comedy horror	Produced by Raghava Productions	
J U L Y	29	Bodinayakkanur Ganesan	Gnanam	Harikumar, Arundhathi, Sai Ravi	Action		
J U L Y	29	Karungali	Kalanjiyam	Kalanjiyam, Anjali, Srinivas, Sunitha Varma, Asmitha	Drama		
J U L Y	29	Markandeyan	FEFSI Vijayan	Sabarash, Savika Chaiyadej (Pinky), Nivedhitha, Srihari	Action		
J U L Y	29	Veppam	Anjana Ali Khan	Karthik Kumar, Nani, Nithya Menen, Bindu Madhavi	Drama	Produced by Photon Kathaas	
A U G	5	Doo	Sriram Padmanabhan	Sanjay, Nakshatra, Sangeetha Bhatt	Romance		
A U G	5	Potta Potti	Yuvaraj	Sadagoppan Ramesh, Harini	Sports comedy		
A U G	5	Ramanathapuram	J. J. Hasen	Rakesh, Archna Sharma	Romance		
A U G	12	Konjam Veyil Konjam Mazhai	Ekadasi	Tej, Nakshatra, Hansifa	Drama	Produced by FCS Creations	
A U G	12	Rowthiram	Gokul	Jiiva, Shriya Saran	Action	Produced by Super Good Films	
A U G	12	Sagakkal	L. Muthukumara Swamy	Sanjeev, Advaitha	Drama	Produced by VVV Creations	
A U G	12	Sankarankovil	Palanivel Raja	Kanal Kannan, Rupika Ramnath, Nassar, Prabhu	Drama	Produced by Sivadarshini Cine Arts	
A U G	12	Uyarthiru 420	Premnath	Snehan, Meghana Raj, Akshara Gowda, Akshaya, Vaseegaran	Action	Produced by Rich India Talkies	
A U G	19	En Ullam Unnai Theduthe	N. Selvaraj	N. Selvaraj, Manjula Vijayakumar, Anandraj, Dhaamu	Romance		
A U G	19	Mittai	M. S. Anbu	Santhosh, Prabha, Mayya Unni	Romance		
A U G	19	Mudhal Idam	R. Kumaran	Vidharth, Kavitha Nair, Kishore	Romantic comedy	Produced by AVM Productions	
A U G	19	Vengayam	Sankagiri Rajkumar	Alexander, Paveena	Drama		
A U G	26	Puli Vesham	P. Vasu	R. K., Karthik, Sadha, Divya Padmini	Drama	Produced by RK Worlds	
A U G	26	Yuvan Yuvathi	G. N. R. Kumaravelan	Bharath, Rima Kallingal	Romance	Produced by Ram Pictures	
A U G	31	Mankatha	Venkat Prabhu	Ajith Kumar, Arjun, Trisha, Lakshmi Rai, Andrea, Vaibhav, Anjali	Action, thriller	Produced by Cloud Nine Movies	
S E P	9	Ayudha Porattam	Jai Akash	Jai Akash, Preeti Minal, Anita Reddy	Action		
S E P	9	Kasethan Kadavulada	Thirumalai	Saran, Pandiarajan, Karunas, Kamna Jethmalani, Sathyan, Divya Padmini	Comedy	Jamal Movie Creations	
S E P	9	Mathikettan Salai	G. Patturajan	Adarsh, Divya Nagesh	Drama		
S E P	16	Engaeyum Eppothum	M. Saravanan	Jai, Anjali, Sharvanand, Ananya	Romantic drama	Produced by Murugadoss Productions	
S E P	16	Vandhaan Vendraan	R. Kannan	Jiiva, Nandha, Taapsee Pannu	Action thriller	Produced by Vasan Visual Ventures	
S E P	23	Aayiram Vilakku	S. P. Hosimin	Sathyaraj, Shanthnoo Bhagyaraj, Sana Khan	Drama	Produced by HMI Pictures	
S E P	23	Thigattadha Kadhal	Manoj		Erotic	produced by Sweet Chilly Entertainment	
S E P	30	Muran	Rajjan Madhav	Prasanna, Cheran, Haripriya, Nikita Thukral, Suma Bhattacharya	Thriller	Produced by UTV Motion Pictures	
S E P	30	Vaagai Sooda Vaa	A. Sargunam	Vimal, Iniya, K. Bhagyaraj	Period piece, romantic drama	Produced by Village Theatres	
S E P	30	Vedi	Prabhu Deva	Vishal, Sameera Reddy, Poonam Kaur	Action-masala	Produced by GK Productions	
O C T	5	Vellore Maavattam	R. N. R. Manohar	Nandha, Poorna	Action	Produced by AGS Entertainment	
O C T	6	Sadhurangam	Karu Pazhaniappan	Srikanth, Sonia Agarwal	Political drama		
O C T	7	Raa Raa	Sandilya	Udhaya, Shweta Basu Prasad	Romantic comedy		
O C T	7	Varnam	S. M. Raju	Giri, Ashwatha, Monica, Sampath Raj	Drama		
O C T	7	Varudangal 20	K. Kennedy	Meenkhotti	Erotic		
O C T	13	Keezhatheru Kicha	N. S. Madhavan	Ramesh Ram, Dharsha, Natassha, Ganja Karuppu	Comedy		
O C T	13	Uyirin Yedai 21 Ayiri	E. L. Indrajith	E.L.Indrajith, Thilakan, Sangamithra	Erotic		
O C T	14	Kaadhal Alla Adhaiyum Thaandi	V. C. Prem	Pravin Ragav, Asini	Romantic drama		
O C T	25	7 Aum Arivu	A. R. Murugadoss	Suriya, Shruti Haasan, Johnny Tri Nguyen, Avinash	Science fiction	Produced by Red Giant Movies	
O C T	26	Velayudham	M. Raja	Vijay, Genelia D'Souza, Hansika Motwani, Saranya Mohan	Action-masala	Produced by Aascar Films	
N O V	11	Konjam Sirippu Konjam Kobam	Sampoornam	Mahesh, Anusha	Romance	Produced by Sri Ashtalakshmi Films	
N O V	11	Naan Sivanagiren	V. K. Gnanashekar	Udhay Karthik, Varsha, Aditya, Prem Kumar	Drama	Produced by MN Creations	
N O V	11	Thambi Vettothi Sundaram	Vadivudaiyan	Karan, Anjali, Saravanan	Drama	Produced by JS 24 Frames	
N O V	18	Vithagan	R. Parthiban	Parthiban, Poorna, Milind Soman	Action	Produced by Seventh Channel Entertainment	
N O V	18	Marudhavelu	RKR Adhimolam	Kailash, Akansha, Nakshatra	Action drama	Produced by S Shanmugapandian	
N O V	25	Mayakkam Enna	Selvaraghavan	Dhanush, Richa Gangopadhyay	Romantic drama	Produced by Aum Productions	
N O V	25	Othigai	A. M. Bhaskar	Jai Akash, Archna Sharma	Romance		
N O V	25	Paalai	Senthamizhan	Shammu, Sunil	Drama		
D E C	1	Poraali	Samuthirakani	M. Sasikumar, Allari Naresh, Swati Reddy, Vasundhara, Niveda	Action-drama	Produced by Company Productions	
D E C	2	Gurusamy	K. R. Vishnaanth	Udhayathara, Manikandan, Delhi Ganesh	Devotional	Produced by Channel R Five Production	
D E C	8	Osthe	Dharani	Silambarasan, Richa Gangopadhyay, Githan Ramesh, Sonu Sood	Action-masala film	Produced by Balaji Real Media	
D E C	8	Venmani	Kathaka Thirumavalavan	Karthik Jai, Kathaga Thirumvalavan	Social	Produced by Karthik Jai Movies	
D E C	8	Neeye En Kadhali	Chinni Jayanth	Chinni Jayanth, Udhay, Priya Sharma	Romance	Produced by Expression Media	
D E C	16	Mambattiyan	Thyagarajan	Prashanth, Meera Jasmine, Mumaith Khan	Action	Produced by Lakshmi Shanthi Movies	
D E C	16	Uchithanai Muharnthaal	Pughazhendi Thangaraj	Neenika, Sathyaraj, Seeman, Sangeetha	Drama	Produced by Global Media & Entertainment	
D E C	16	Mouna Guru	Shantha Kumar	Arulnithi, Iniya, John Vijay, Uma Riyaz Khan	Action	Produced by Mohana Movies	
D E C	23	Rajapattai	Suseenthiran	Vikram, Deeksha Seth, K. Vishwanath	Action-masala	Produced by PVP Cinema	
D E C	30	Mahaan Kanakku	Sampath	Ramana, Reecha Sinha	Drama	Produced by Pooja Film International	
D E C	30	Maharaja	Manoharan	Sathya, Anjali, Nassar, Anita Hassanandani	Comedy		
D E C	30	Paavi	Thambi Durai	Rethuthu, Singamuthu, Steve, Vijayakumar	Drama	Produced by Thennaga Thirai Koodam	
D E C	30	Padhinettan Kudi Ellai Arambam	N. Sundareswaran	Prithvi Rajan, Srinisha	Romance	Produced by SMS Talkies	
D E C	30	Karuthakannan C/O Rekla Race	A. Senthil Anandhan	V. Rishiraj, Subhash, Soundarya, Stalin, Mamta	Action	Produced by Roshan Films International	
D E C	30	Vazhi Vidu Kanne Vazhi Vidu	S. G. Alikhan, M. G. Shankar	Thamizh, Madhu Shree	Romance	Produced by MGS Productions	

== Awards ==
Category/organization	Filmfare Awards South 7 July 2012	SIIMA Awards 22 June 2012	Tamil Nadu State Film Awards 14 July 2017	Vijay Awards 16 June 2012
Best Film	Aadukalam	Ko	Vaagai Sooda Vaa	Engeyum Eppodhum
Best Director	Vetrimaaran; Aadukalam	Vetrimaaran; Aadukalam	A. L. Vijay; Deiva Thirumagal	Vetrimaaran; Aadukalam
Best Actor	Dhanush; Aadukalam	Dhanush; Aadukalam	Vemal; Vaagai Sooda Vaa	Vikram; Deiva Thirumagal
Best Actress	Anjali; Engeyum Eppodhum	Asin; Kaavalan	Iniya; Vaagai Sooda Vaa	Anjali; Engeyum Eppodhum
Best Music Director	G. V. Prakash Kumar; Aadukalam	G. V. Prakash Kumar; Aadukalam	Harris Jayaraj; Ko	G. V. Prakash Kumar; Aadukalam

== Notable deaths ==
Month	Date	Name	Age	Profession	Notable films
January	11	Shobana	31	Actress	Sillunu Oru Kaadhal • Sura • Siruthai
February	20	Malaysia Vasudevan	66	Singer, actor	Mr. Bharath • Adutha Varisu • Kizhakku Cheemayile
February	21	M. Peethambaram	90	Producer, makeup artist
April	6	Sujatha	58	Actress	Aval Oru Thodar Kathai • Avargal • Baba
April	14	Rami Reddy	52	Actor	Alaiyadikkuthu • Thadayam • VIP
April	22	Anil	33	Music director	Kadhalna Summa Illai • Netru Indru Naalai
May	1	Alex	52	Actor/magician	Valli • Kovilpatti Veeralakshmi
July	25	Ravichandran	71	Actor	Kadalikka Neramillai • Athey Kangal • Utharavindri Ulle Vaa • Arunachalam
July	29	Ajai	25	Actor	Ambuli
August	8	Glamour Krishnamurthy	74	PRO
August	14	Radha Narayanan	51	Producer	Kanchana • Kutty • Sahadevan Mahadevan
August	18	Samir Chanda		Art director	Aalavandhan • Dasavathaaram • Raavanan
September	9	Gandhimathi	65	Actress	Karagattakaran • Walter Vetrivel • Muthu • Agal Vilaku
October	14	Saleem	80	Choreographer	Captain Prabhakaran • Ilamai Oonjal Aadukirathu • Vietnam Veedu
October	28	LIC Narasimhan	71	Actor	Aarilirunthu Arubathu Varai • Themmangu Pattukkaran
December	9	P. S. Loknath	70	Cinematographer	Apoorva Raagangal • Aval Oru Thodar Kathai • Moondru Mudichu
