= List of Tamil films of 2010 =

Prior to the amendment of the Tamil Nadu Entertainments Tax Act of 1939 on 22 July 2006, the gross was 115 percent of the net income for all films. After the amendment, the gross was equal to the net for films with purely Tamil titles. The Commercial Taxes Department reported an entertainment tax revenue of ₹15.41 crore for the year.

This is a list of films released in 2010.

== Box office collection ==
Rank	Film	Worldwide gross
1	Enthiran	₹250−320 crore
2	Singam	₹90 crore
3	Vinnaithaandi Varuvaayaa	₹43 crore
4	Paiyaa	₹41 crore
5	Boss engira bhaskran	₹20 crore

== List of released films ==
=== January – March ===
Opening		Title	Director	Cast	Studio	Ref
J A N	1	Pugaippadam	Rajesh Lingam	Amjad, Priya Anand, Harish	Boys Studios	
J A N	1	Thunichal	Majith	Arun Vijay, Swathika, Shiva Munjal, Ramana	Sri Ambrishini Arts	
J A N	8	Kalasaaram	Kutty Radha	Satish, Yathra	Sozha Subramani	
J A N	14	Aayirathil Oruvan	Selvaraghavan	Karthi Sivakumar, Reemma Sen, Andrea Jeremiah, Parthiban	Dream Valley Films	
J A N	14	Kutty	M. Jawahar	Dhanush, Shriya Saran, Sameer Dattani	Gemini Film Circuit	
J A N	14	Naanayam	Shakti S. Rajan	Prasanna, Sibiraj, Ramya Raj, S. P. Balasubrahmanyam	Capital Film Works	
J A N	14	Porkkalam	Bandi Saroj Kumar	Kishore, Sathyan, Smitha, Sampath Raj	Bharani Minerals	
J A N	29	Goa	Venkat Prabhu	Jai, Premji Amaren, Vaibhav Reddy, Sneha, Melanie Marie, Piaa Bajpai	Ocher Picture Productions	
J A N	29	Jaggubhai	K. S. Ravikumar	Sarath Kumar, Shriya Saran, Goundamani	Radaan Mediaworks	
J A N	29	Kathai	Abhishek Shankar	Shaan Kumar, Nivedhitha, Abhinay	Akash Akshai Raj Cine International	
J A N	29	Thairiyam	P. Kumaran	P. Kumaran, Karthika, Deepu	R. P. Creations	
J A N	29	Tamizh Padam	C. S. Amudhan	Shiva, Disha Pandey	Cloud Nine Movies	
F E B	5	Aasal	Saran	Ajith Kumar, Sameera Reddy, Bhavana	Sivaji Productions	
F E B	12	Theeradha Vilaiyattu Pillai	Thiru	Vishal, Neetu Chandra, Tanushree Dutta, Sarah-Jane Dias	G. K. Films Corporation	
F E B	12	Rasikkum Seemane	R. K. Vidyadaran	Srikanth, Navya Nair, Aravind Akash	Trans India	
F E B	19	Azhukkan	Omesh Kesar	Omesh Kesar, Neela, Sangeetha, Venu Aravind, Jayashree	Solar Movies	
F E B	26	Innisai Kavalan	Wilfred Gomes	Wilfred Gomes, Aarthipuri, Riyaz Khan	Will International	
F E B	26	Vinnaithaandi Varuvaayaa	Gautham Vasudev Menon	Silambarasan, Trisha	Escape Artists Motion Pictures, RS Infotainment	
M A R	5	Aval Peyar Thamizharasi	Meera Kathiravan	Jai, Nandagi	Moser Baer & Blue Ocean Entertainment	
M A R	5	Kumari Pennin Ullathile	S. Kishore	Chandra Haasan, Sippy, S. Kishore	Visak Movies	
M A R	5	Thambikku Indha Ooru	Badri	Bharath, Sana Khan, Madalsa Sharma	VK Media	
M A R	5	Veerasekaran	Sathish Kumar	Veerasamar, Amala Paul, Prathap K. Pothan	FCS Creations	
M A R	12	Azhagaana Ponnuthan	Thiru	Namitha, Raj Karthik	K Cinema	
M A R	12	Karunai	Ilan	Ilan, Gayathri Rajagopal, Master Balaji	Ram Sairam Films	
M A R	12	Maathi Yosi	Nandha Periyasamy	Shammu, Harish, Gopal, Alex, Lokesh	PSSR films	
M A R	12	Yathumaagi	R. Balakumar	Sachin, Sunaina	Chozha Creations	
M A R	19	Kacheri Arambam	Thiraivannan	Jiiva, Poonam Bajwa, J. D. Chakravarthy, Vadivelu	Super Good Films	
M A R	19	Mundhinam Paartheney	Magizh Thirumeni	Sanjay, Ekta Khosla, Lizna	Seventh Channel Communications	
M A R	26	Angadi Theru	Vasanthabalan	Mahesh, Anjali	Ayngaran International	
M A R	26	Padagasalai	J. Tamil	Satya, Aravind, R. Sanjay, Iniya, Preethi Pushpan	Devavijayam Film Makers	

=== April – June ===
Opening		Title	Director	Cast	Studio	Ref
A P R	2	Paiyaa	Linguswamy	Karthi, Tamannaah Bhatia, Milind Soman	Thirupathi Brothers	
A P R	9	Sivappu Mazhai	V. Krishnamurthy	Suresh Joachim, Meera Jasmine	Joachim International	
A P R	23	Bayam Ariyaan	Prathesh	Mahesh Kumar, Udhayathara, Kishore	Jeyamathey Pictures	
A P R	23	Pattu Vanna Rosavam	S. S. Senthil Kumar	Kovur Ravi, Avanya	Kovur Ravi	
A P R	23	Rettaisuzhi	Thamira	K. Balachander, Bharathiraja, Aari, Anjali	S Pictures	
A P R	30	Sura	S. P. Rajkumar	Vijay, Tamannaah Bhatia, Dev Gill, Vadivelu	Murugan Cine Arts	
M A Y	7	Goripalayam	Rasu Madhuravan	Ramakrishnan, Vikranth, Harish, Prakash	Global Infotainment	
M A Y	7	Guru Sishyan	Sakthi Chidambaram	Sathyaraj, Sundar C, Shruti Marathe, Santhanam	Cinema Paradise	
M A Y	7	Irumbukkottai Murattu Singam	Chimbudevan	Raghava Lawrence, Lakshmi Rai, Padmapriya, Sandhya	AGS Entertainment	
M A Y	7	Kutti Pisasu	Rama Narayanan	Baby Keerthika, Ramji, Sangeetha, Ramya Krishnan, Kaveri	Sri Thenandal Films	
M A Y	14	Maa	Fathima Beevi	Deepak	Kalai Vizhi	
M A Y	21	Kanagavel Kaaka	Kavin Bala	Karan, Haripriya	Akarshini Theatres	
M A Y	21	Kola Kolaya Mundhirika	Madhumitha	Karthik Kumar, Shikha, Jayaram	Giriguja Films International	
M A Y	21	Maanja Velu	A. Venkatesh	Arun Vijay, Karthik, Dhansika	Feather Touch Entertainment	
M A Y	21	Magane En Marumagane	T. P. Gajendran	Vivek, Mithun, Thenmozhi, Yamini Sharma	Muthulakshmi Movies	
M A Y	28	Kadhalagi	K. R. Vishwaa	Krishnakumar, Srushti Dange, Prakash Raj	K Creations	
M A Y	28	Kattradhu Kalavu	Balaji Devi Prasad	Kreshna, Vijayalakshmi	Talking Times	
M A Y	28	Singam	Hari	Suriya, Anushka Shetty, Prakash Raj	Studio Green	
J U N	3	Pen Singam	Bali Srirangam	Meera Jasmine, Uday Kiran, Richard	J Nandini Arts	
J U N	11	Drogam Nadanthathu Enna	Sameer	Kishore, Saso, Leena, Swati Verma, Ramya Sen	B Pictures	
J U N	11	Orr Eravuu	Hari Shankar	Sathish, Avantika, Ajay	Shankar Bros	
J U N	11	Pa. Ra. Palanisamy	M. Muthurathnam	Sundaram, Ashwin, Srinivas Rao, Meenakshi Kailash	Thangam Real Pictures	
J U N	18	Raavanan	Mani Ratnam	Vikram, Aishwarya Rai, Prithviraj	Madras Talkies	
J U N	25	Kalavani	A. Sargunam	Vemal, Oviya	Sherali Films	
J U N	25	Milaga	Ravi Mariya	Natty, Poongodi, Suja	Shri Nataraja Arts	
J U N	25	Thittakudi	Sundaran	Ravi, Aswatha	Sri Krishna Pictures	
J U N	25	Unakkaga Oru Kavithai	Karthick Kumar	Vinoth Kumaran, Risha	Thomas Cine Creations	
J U N	25	Indrasena	Bharath	Sriman, Srinivasan, Anandaraj, Aishwarya Rajesh	Baba Cine Combines	

=== July – September ===
Opening		Title	Director	Cast	Studio	Ref
J U L	2	Ambasamudram Ambani	Ramnath	Karunas, Navaneet Kaur	Ken Media	
J U L	2	Pournami Nagam	Yaar Kannan	Mumaith Khan, Karunas	Bharath Cine Media	
J U L	2	Veluthu Kattu	Senapathi Magan	Kathir, Arundhathi, Archna Sharma, Pavina	Star Makers	
J U L	9	Anandhapurathu Veedu	Naga	Nandha, Chaya Singh	S Pictures	
J U L	9	Madrasapattinam	A. L. Vijay	Arya, Amy Jackson	AGS Entertainment	
J U L	16	Antharangam	J. V. Rukmangathan	Prasanna, Kamalika	Leo International	
J U L	16	Devaleelai	Prabhakaran	Dhanakumar, Roopa, Kavitha, Swetha, Pushpa Naik	3D Studio Com Entertainment Company	
J U L	16	Pollachi Mappillai	R. Latchumanan	Sathyaraj, Goundamani, Susan	Priyanka Art Productions	
J U L	16	Virunthali	Udayasankaran Whaterman	Ishvar, Vidya Pradeep	Gopika International	
J U L	23	Singamugam	N. P. Ismail	Haneefa, Dheepan, Dimple Rose	Friends Pictures	
J U L	23	Thillalangadi	Mohan Raja	Jayam Ravi, Tamannaah Bhatia, Shaam	Jayam Company	
J U L	23	Vizhiyil Vizhunthaval	Ajaz	Ajaz, Shilpa, Anaka	G-Ants Productions	
J U L	30	Aaravadhu Vanam	R. Bhuvanesh	Bhushan, Vidhya Mohan, Bose Venkat	MPG Films International	
J U L	30	Ilakkana Pizhai	Govindaraj	Aarumugam, Sathya, Swathisri	Yuva Entertainments	
J U L	30	Thambi Arjuna	Vijay R. Anand	Ramana, Feroz Khan, Ashima Bhalla	Angel Film International	
A U G	6	Baana Kaathadi	Badri Venkatesh	Atharvaa, Samantha, Prasanna	Sathya Jyothi Films	
A U G	6	Pesuvatha Kiliya	S. Gowrishankar	Shakthi, Vijith, Dharshini	GR Movies	
A U G	13	Kaadhal Solla Vandhen	Boopathy Pandian	Balaji Balakrishnan, Meghana Raj	S3 Films	
A U G	13	Mandabam	R. Senthamil Arasu	S. T. Tamilarasan, Siniya	Thilaka Arts	
A U G	13	Vamsam	Pandiraj	Arulnidhi, Sunaina	Moghana Movies	
A U G	20	Inidhu Inidhu	K. V. Guhan	Narayan, Arun Iswaran, Sharran, Reshmi Menon	Duet Movies	
A U G	20	Kaipesi Yen	Vishwaksenan	Aadarsh, Jillu	Innovations	
A U G	20	Naan Mahaan Alla	Suseenthiran	Karthi, Kajal Aggarwal	Studio Green	
A U G	27	Moscowin Kavery	Ravi Varman	Rahul Ravindran, Samantha, Harshavardhan	R Films	
A U G	27	Neeyum Naanum	S. V. Solairaja	Sanjeev, Chetna Pande	Team Visions	
A U G	27	Puthumugam	Nagaraj	Gowtham, Vibha Rai, Aswathi	Nethraa Films	
A U G	27	Raamar	Aathiraja	Vinay Dutta, Anumol	SR Pictures	
A U G	27	Unakkaga En Kadhal	Jaykumar	Vishnupriyan, Shraddha, Shravan	Jaykumar Films	
A U G	27	Vilai	G. Kamaraj	Saravanan, Bharani, Udhayathara, Ritu Soni	SB Film Productions	
S E P	3	Bale Pandiya	Siddharth Chandrasekhar	Vishnu Vishal, Piaa Bajpai, Gibran Osman	AGS Entertainment	
S E P	3	Irandu Mugam	Arvindraj	Karan, Sathyaraj, Suhani Kalita	Udayar Studios	
S E P	3	Kalloori Kalangal	Remoo Siva	Sukumar, Priyanka Chandra	Starting Point Cinema	
S E P	3	Puzhal	Azhagu Rajasundaram	Hemachandran, Mano, Murali, Aswatha, Archna Sharma, Sonam Singh	Classic Movies	
S E P	3	Ragasiyam	Harish		Super Hit Movies	
S E P	3	Sindhu Samaveli	Samy	Harish Kalyan, Amala Paul	Global Infotainment	
S E P	10	Boss Engira Bhaskaran	M. Rajesh	Arya, Nayantara, Santhanam	Vasan Visual Ventures	
S E P	10	Drohi	Sudha Kongara Prasad	Srikanth, Vishnu Vishal, Poonam Bajwa, Poorna, Pooja	Indira Innovations	
S E P	10	Tiruppur	M. C. Duraisamy	Prabha, Udhai, Unni Maya	Friends Production	
S E P	17	365 Kadhal Kadithangal	N. Pandian	Yuva Karthik, Ajay, Karthika Adaikalam	Vision 21 Creative Team Works	
S E P	17	En Kanmani Priya	Ravi Vetrivel	Vadivukkarasi, Ankitha Rao, Ramesh, Praveen	Akshaya Cine Films and Raghul Varma J Movies	
S E P	17	Vandae Maatharam	D. Aravind	Mammootty, Arjun, Jai Akash, Sneha	Pankaj Productions	

=== October – December ===
Opening		Title	Director	Cast	Studio	Ref
O C T	1	Enthiran	S. Shankar	Rajinikanth, Aishwarya Rai	Sun Pictures	
O C T	15	Gowravargal	Sanjay Ram	Sathyaraj, Vignesh, Monica	Cine Screens	
O C T	15	Naane Ennul Illai	Jayachitra	Amresh Ganesh, Arya Menon	Senthur Murugan Combines	
O C T	15	Ochayee	O. Aasaithambi	Dhaya, Thamarai	Aachi Kizhavi Thirai Koodam	
O C T	15	Thottupaar	K. V. Nandhu	Vidharth, Lakshana, Ramana	Tholl Paavai Theatres	
O C T	15	Vaadaa	A. Venkatesh	Sundar C, Sheryl Brindo, Vivek	Screenplay Entertainment	
O C T	22	Aarvam	Aadithyan	Satya, R. Sanjay, Meenu Karthika	Movie Dreams	
O C T	22	Ithu Kadhal Uthirum Kaalam	J. Tamizh	Jayanraj, Shivashri, Geetha	Shri Shri	
O C T	22	Thangapaambu	Balamurugan	Karthikeyan, Srirekha	Arulmigu Kodiyidai Nayagi Amman Creations	
O C T	22	Unnaiye Kadhalipen	A. R. Sivajidass	Rathan Mouli, Anjali Nair, R. R. Velu, Sushma	Saravanaa Film Maker	
O C T	29	Neethana Avan	Punch Bharath	Sadhan, Sriman, Srinivasan, Aishwarya Rajesh, Jayashree	Vetrivel Creations	
N O V	5	Chithira Poove	R. Kalaimurugan	Sandeep, Thamarai	Sri Periyandavar Films	
N O V	5	Mynaa	Prabu Solomon	Vidharth, Amala Paul	Shalom Studios	
N O V	5	Uthama Puthiran	Mithran Jawahar	Dhanush, Genelia D'Souza	Balaji Studios	
N O V	5	Va	Pushkar-Gayathri	Shiva, Lekha Washington, S. P. B. Charan	YNOT Studios	
N O V	5	Vallakottai	A. Venkatesh	Arjun, Haripriya	ESK Films International	
N O V	19	Magizhchi	V. Gowthaman	V. Gowthaman, Anjali, Prakash Raj	Athirvu Thiraipattarai	
N O V	19	Mandhira Punnagai	Karu Pazhaniappan	Karu Pazhaniappan, Meenakshi, Santhanam	Metro Films	
N O V	19	Nagaram Marupakkam	Sundar C	Sundar C, Anuya Bhagvath, Vadivelu	Avni Cinemax	
N O V	26	Kanimozhi	Sripathi	Jai, Shazahn Padamsee, Vijay Vasanth	Amma Creations	
N O V	26	Nandalala	Mysskin	Mysskin, Snigdha Akolkar, Ashwath Ram	Ayngaran International	
D E C	3	Chikku Bukku	K. Manikandan	Arya, Shriya Saran, Preetika Rao	Metro Films	
D E C	3	Tha	R. K. Surya Prabhakar	Harish Uthaman, Nisha	Shreya Films	
D E C	10	Agam Puram	Thirumalai	Shaam, Meenakshi	T Creations	
D E C	10	Ayyanar	Rajamithran	Aadhi, Meera Nandan	Sri Rajlakshmi Films	
D E C	10	Sanikizhamai Saayangalam 5 Mani	Ravibharathi	Sarath, Malini	S. P. S. Mediaa Works	
D E C	10	Siddu +2	K. Bhagyaraj	Shanthnoo Bhagyaraj, Chandini	KBR Medias	
D E C	10	Virudhagiri	Vijayakanth	Vijayakanth, Meenakshi Dixit	Captain Cine Creations	
D E C	17	Aattanayagann	Krishnaram	Sakthi Vasu, Remya Nambeesan	Lakshmi Movie Makers	
D E C	17	Easan	M. Sasikumar	Samuthirakani, Vaibhav, Abhinaya, Aparna Bajpai	Company Productions	
D E C	23	Manmadan Ambu	K. S. Ravikumar	Kamal Haasan, R. Madhavan, Trisha	Red Giant Movies	
D E C	24	Aridhu Aridhu	K. R. Mathivannan	Harish Kalyan, Uttara Raj, Princess Jasmine	JK Creations	
D E C	24	Athisaya Manal Matha	R. Shambathkumar	Vinu Chakravarthy, Ponnambalam	Worldwide Films	
D E C	24	Chutti Chathan	Jijo	Baby Sonia, Prakash Raj, Santhanam	Sri Thenandal Films	
D E C	24	Nellu	M. Sivashankar	Sathya, Bhaghyanjali	Karthik Jaya Movies Ltd.	
D E C	24	Thenmerku Paruvakaatru	Seenu Ramasamy	Vijay Sethupathi, Vasundhara, Saranya	Global Infotainment	
D E C	31	Kotti	Sivan Gurukalyan	Sivan, Bhagyanjali, Saikumar	Aanjhana Cinemas	
D E C	31	Mudhal Kadhal Mazhai	Mathuvannan	Mahendran, Swathika	Maruthi Global Arts	
D E C	31	Nalamdhana	Mathuvannan	Srikumar, Sanyathara, Sri Vishnu, Jothisha	M. G. Production	
D E C	31	Villalan	Vetri-Suriyan	Vetrivel, Ashmitha	Vel Pictures	

== Awards ==
Category/organization	Filmfare Awards South 2 July 2011	Tamil Nadu State Film Awards 14 July 2017	Vijay Awards 25 July 2011
Best Film	Mynaa	Mynaa	Angadi Theru
Best Director	Vasanthabalan; Angadi Theru	Prabhu Solomon; Mynaa	Vasanthabalan; Angadi Theru
Best Actor	Vikram; Raavanan	Vikram; Raavanan	Vikram; Raavanan
Best Actress	Anjali; Angadi Theru	Amala Paul; Mynaa	Anjali; Angadi Theru
Best Music Director	A. R. Rahman; Vinnaithaandi Varuvaayaa	Yuvan Shankar Raja; Paiyaa	A. R. Rahman; Vinnaithaandi Varuvaayaa

== Notable deaths ==
Month	Date	Name	Age	Profession	Notable films
February	2	Cochin Haneefa	61	Actor, director	Mahanadhi • Mudhalvan • Madrasapattinam
March	23	P. N. Sundaram	82	Cinematographer	Adimai Penn • Enga Veettu Pillai • Vietnam Veedu
April	23	Sreenath	53	Actor	Chinna Mul Peria Mul • Rail Payanangalil
May	22	Veturi	74	Lyricist	Aayirathil Oruvan
August	3	Angamuthu	81	Art director	Ulagam Sutrum Vaaliban
September	6	K. S. Ravi	45	Director	En Swaasa Kaatrae • Honest Raj • Mr. Romeo
September	8	Murali	46	Actor	Idhayam • Pagal Nilavu • Poovilangu
September	12	Swarnalatha	37	Playback singer	Valli • Chinna Thambi • Karuththamma • Alaipayuthey
September	30	Chandrabose	55	Music director	Mangudi Minor • Manithan • Raja Chinna Roja
October	8	S. S. Chandran	69	Actor	En Thangai Kalyani • Patti Sollai Thattathe • Uzhaippali
December	12	B. S. Ranga	93	Director	Nichaya Thaamboolam • Pattikaattu Ponnaiya
