= Kabadi Bro =

2023 Indian film by Sathish Jayaraman

- Official poster
- Directed by: Sathish Jayaraman
- Written by: Sathish Jayaraman
- Produced by: Usha Shathish
- Starring: Sujann; Priyaa Lal; Sanjay; Singampuli; Rajini M.
- Cinematography: E. Krishnasamy
- Edited by: S P Ahamed
- Music by: A J Daniel
- Production company: Usha Shathish
- Release date: 30 June 2023
- Country: India
- Language: Tamil

Kabadi Bro is a 2023 Indian Tamil-language sports romantic film written and directed by Sathish Jayaraman. The film stars Sujann, Priyaa Lal, Sanjay, Singampuli and Rajini in the lead roles. The film was produced by Usha Shathish under the banners of Anjhana Cinemas. The film was released in theatres 30 June 2023 after a four year delay.

== Cast ==
- Sujann as Veerabagu
- Priyaa Lal as Abhirami
- Sanjay as Shakti
- Singampuli as Argent Muthu
- Madhusudhan Rao as Isakki Pandiyan
- Rajini M.
- Manobala
- Shanmugasundaram
- Meera Krishnan
- Scissor Manohar

== Production ==
The film began production in 2019 as Veerabhagu with Senthil as the director. The film was produced by Usha Shathish under the banner of Anjhana Cinemas. The cinematography was done by E Krishnasamy, while editing was handled by S P Ahamed.

== Reception ==
A critic from Dina Thanthi wrote that "Director Satish Jayaraman captures the attention by moving the scenes of love and conflict in the background of Kabaddi game lively and lively." Nanthini of Virakesari rated 2.5 out of 5 and gave mixed review.
