= Antharangam =

Indian drama film

- Poster
- Directed by: J. V. Rukmangathan
- Written by: J. V. Rukmangathan
- Produced by: P. R. Lalita
- Starring: Dann; Sanjay; Kamalika Chanda; Sindhu
- Cinematography: K. Nityanand
- Edited by: B. Krishna Kumar
- Music by: K. Rajbhaskar
- Production company: Leo International
- Release date: 16 July 2010
- Country: India
- Language: Tamil

Antharangam (transl. Privacy) is a 2010 Indian Tamil-language drama film directed by J. V. Rukmangathan and starring Dann, Sanjay, Kamalika Chanda and Sindhu.

== Plot ==
A man meets a woman who went through traumatic experiences at a brothel and she tells him about her various sexual encounters.

== Cast ==
- Dann (Prasanna) as Madan
- Sanjay as Ramesh
- Kamalika Chanda as Mohana
- Sindhu as Sarasa

== Production ==
Prasanna, who previously starred in Madhumati (1993) and Panchalankurichi (1996), made a comeback through this film. Sindhu, who previously starred in Angadi Theru (2010), made her lead debut through this film.

== Release and reception ==
The film was released on 16 July 2010 alongside a similar themed film Devaleelai, Pollachi Mappillai and Virunthali.

A critic from The New Indian Express wrote that "It`s no doubt a bold depiction of the murkier side of sex prevalent in society. But in revealing the hidden truth, the director has made it a voyeuristic journey of crude skin show, and titillating bedroom scenes". A critic from Dinamalar wrote that the film is music for A cinema fans to see at B and C centres.
