= Doo (film) =

Indian Tamil-language romantic comedy film

- Theatrical release poster
- Directed by: Sriram Padmanabhan
- Produced by: R. Gunasekaran; K. N. Aadhinarayanan
- Starring: Sanjay; Nakshatra; Sangeetha Bhat
- Cinematography: C. R. Maravarman
- Edited by: A. L. Ramesh
- Music by: Abhishek—Lawrence
- Production company: AG Entertainment
- Release date: 5 August 2011
- Country: India
- Language: Tamil

Doo (transl. Angry) is a 2011 Indian Tamil-language romantic comedy film written and directed by Sriram Padmanabhan and produced by AG Entertainment. The film features Sanjay and Nakshatra in the lead roles, alongside Sangeetha Bhat and Urvashi. The music was composed by Abhishek—Lawrence with cinematography by C. R. Maravarman and editing by A. L. Ramesh. The film released on 5 August 2011.

== Cast ==
- Sanjay as Vasanth
- Nakshatra as Swapna
- Sangeetha Bhat as Anu
- Urvashi as Vasanth's mother
- Rajesh as Swapna's father
- Mayilswamy
- Manobala
- Jagan as Kutty
- Lollu Sabha Jeeva as Karthik
- Japan Kumar (special appearance in the song "Dooda")

== Production ==
Debutant director Sriram Padmanabhan cast Sanjay of Mundhinam Paartheney in the lead role, alongside Nakshatra, who made her acting debut in Tamil cinema. Nakshatra was the daughter of former actress Sumithra and film producer D. Rajendra Babu. Sangeetha Bhat, who ad previously appeared in Kannada television serials, also debuted in Tamil cinema through the project.

== Soundtrack ==
The film had six songs composed by music composer duo Abhishek—Lawrence in their debut.

Track listing
No.	Title	Lyrics	Singer(s)	Length
1.	"Kaiya Thoda Vendam"	Yugabharathi	Ranjith, VJ Divya	4:08
2.	"Oru Naal Vidu Murai"	G. Kumar	Haricharan, Prashanthini	3:51
3.	"Dooda"	G. Kumar	T. Rajendar, Abhishek, Lawrence	4:39
4.	"Nadhiyilae"	Na. Muthukumar	Silambarasan	4:35
5.	"Va Va"	Yugabharathi	Reshmonu	3:43
6.	"Nadhiyilae (Fully Loaded)"	Na. Muthukumar	Silambarasan	4:00
Total length:				24:56

== Release and reception ==
The film had a theatrical release across Tamil Nadu on 5 August 2011. A reviewer from The New Indian Express wrote "Despite its minor flaws, Doo is a promising work from a debutant filmmaker", calling it a "well-attempted love story". A reviewer from Sify also gave the film a mixed review, though stated "the film is an attempt at a clean entertainer by director Sriram and is to be commended in that aspect. Setting a reasonable pace, with no room for melodrama, emotional excess or over acting anywhere, the director succeeds in keeping you guessing the outcome till the end."

Sriram later moved on to work on Mappillai Vinayagar featuring Lollu Sabha Jeeva in the lead role, but the film did not eventually have a theatrical release.
