= Marudhavelu =

2011 film by R. K. R. Aathimoolam

- Directed by: R. K. R. Aathimoolam
- Written by: R. K. R. Aathimoolam
- Produced by: S. Shanmuga Pandian
- Starring: Kailash; Akanksha; Nakshatra
- Cinematography: C. Dhanabalan
- Edited by: V. J. Sabu Joseph
- Music by: James Vasanthan
- Production company: Siva Thangam Films
- Release date: 18 November 2011
- Running time: 120 minutes
- Country: India
- Language: Tamil

Marudhavelu is a 2011 Indian Tamil language action drama film written and directed by R. K. R. Aathimoolam. The film stars newcomers Kailash, Akanksha and Nakshatra, with Ilavarasu, Bangalore Swamy, Rekha, Santhana Bharathi, Pandu, Kallukkul Eeram Ramanathan, Theni Murugan, Kottachi, Muthuraj, Thenali, Crane Manohar, Sabitha Anand, and Pollachi Babu playing supporting roles. The film, produced by S. Shanmuga Pandian, had musical score by James Vasanthan and editing by V. J. Sabu Joseph. The film was released on 18 November 2011. Actor Vijay Sethupathi lent his voice to Kailash.

== Plot ==
In Rajapalayam, Marudhavelu is a wastrel who spends his time drinking and hanging out with his friends. After the death of his mother, Marudhavelu is pampered by his father, who is a rich and respected man. Marudhavelu and his cousin Manju are in love. One night, Marudhavelu catches the village priest with a prostitute in the village temple, and with his friends, he beats him up. At the village court, the priest lies that Marudhavelu was with the prostitute, and the villagers start to believe it. Marudhavelu decides to find that prostitute to be declared innocent and to prove to Manju that he only loves her. To find the prostitute, Marudhavelu enters the house of the village prostitute Dhanam to interrogate her. Manju, who witnesses it, misinterprets the situation, and she is now disgusted for being in love with Marudhavelu. That night, a distraught Marudhavelu drinks much alcohol and sneaks into Manju's bedroom to explain what really happened, but Manju does not want to listen to him and asks for help. At the village court, Manju's family accuses Marudhavelu of attempting to rape Manju that night, and Manju even confirms it, leaving Marudhavelu aghast. The village head, therefore, bans Marudhavelu from the village for one year.

Muthu and Shanthi, two young lovers from the village, try to elope, and Muthu's family chases them. Marudhavelu comes to their rescue, and the three escape by taking the bus. In Chennai, they immediately go to the registrar's office for marriage, but the powerful local don Kalivardhan alias Annachi arrives there with his henchmen, kills Shanthi, and kidnaps Muthu. Annachi then bribes him for his silence, and Marudhavelu surprisingly takes the money, but only to give it to Shanthi's parents. The lawyer Vidya Venugopalan helps Marudhavelu lodge a complaint against Annachi for the murder of Shanthi. Vidya Venugopalan has her own reason to take revenge on Annachi: in the past, Annachi brutally killed her mother for being a witness to one of his crimes. In the meantime, Vidhya falls in love with Marudhavelu, but Marudhavelu is still in love with Manju. Marudhavelu then convinces a judge to help him. In court, the judge orders the police to reexamine all the cases against Annachi and arrest him. Marudhavelu eventually returns to his village. Manju learns that Marudhavelu is innocent and he only loves her. Annachi and his henchmen try to kill Marudhavelu in his village, and Marudhavelu fights back. During the fight, Annachi kills Marudhavelu's father, and Marudhavelu's friends then kill Annachi.

== Cast ==
- Kailash as Marudhavelu (voice dubbed by Vijay Sethupathi)
- Akanksha as Manju
- Nakshatra as Vidhya Venugopalan
- Ilavarasu as Marudhavelu's father
- Bangalore Swamy as Kalivardhan (Annachi)
- Rekha as Vidhya's mother
- Santhana Bharathi as Judge
- Pandu as Sub-Inspector
- Kallukkul Eeram Ramanathan as Priest
- Theni Murugan as Marudhavelu's friend
- Kottachi as Marudhavelu's friend
- Muthuraj as Marudhavelu's friend
- Thenali as Marudhavelu's friend
- Crane Manohar as Kathamuthu
- Sabitha Anand as Ponnuthayi
- Pollachi Babu as Doraisamy, Marudhavelu's brother-in-law
- Kalloori Hemalatha as Selvi, Marudhavelu's sister
- Usha Elizabeth as Marudhavelu's aunt
- Baby Abhirami as Nandhini, Marudhavelu's niece
- Sri Vidya as Shanthi
- Suruli Manohar as Sodalamuthu
- Kottai Perumal as Perumal
- Sugunthan as Andrews
- Vidhyasree
- Thalaivasal Vijay in a special appearance
- Bhanu Chander in a special appearance
- Eesan Sujatha in a special appearance
- Laksha in a special appearance

== Production ==
R. K. R. Aathimoolam made his directorial debut with Marudhavelu under the banner of Siva Thangam Films. Malayalam actor Kailash was chosen to play the title role. Kailash confessed, "I am not fluent in Tamil and it was a challenge mouthing the dialogues with a "Madras" slang". Newcomer Akanksha, a model from Bangalore, was cast to play a glamorous role while Nakshatra, the second daughter of actress Sumithra, was selected to play the role of a lawyer. The film, completed in eight months, was shot in Chennai and Rajapalayam.

== Soundtrack ==
Marudhavelu

Soundtrack album by James Vasanthan
- Released: 4 November 2011
- Recorded: 2010
- Genre: Feature film soundtrack
- Length: 24:06
- Label: Think Music India
- Producer: James Vasanthan

The film score and the soundtrack were composed by James Vasanthan.

Tracklist
No.	Title	Lyrics	Singer(s)	Length
1.	"Kala Kala Kala"	Na. Muthukumar	Sunanthan, Sharanya Srinivas	4:51
2.	"Thokkanam Kuruvi Kudu"	Mohan Raj	Ananth, Sangeetha	5:06
3.	"Maruthani Sevakalaiya"	Thanjai Ayyappan	Thanjai Ayyappan, Thanjai Selvi	5:24
4.	"Vaarome Kanavodu"	Mohan Raj	Velmurugan	4:19
5.	"Yetho Yetho"	Mohan Raj	Mathangi Jagdish	4:26
Total length:				24:06

== Release ==
The film was released on 18 November 2011 alongside Vithagan.

The New Indian Express said, "The influence of similarly plotted films is evident throughout director Athimoolam's work and very little effort seems to have gone into the script to make it novel or exciting" and concluded, "Marudhavelu is passable work from a debutant filmmaker". In contrast, Kungumam praised the songs, the cinematography and the fast-paced screenplay.
