= Coolie (1995 film) =

- Poster
- Directed by: P. Vasu
- Written by: P. Vasu
- Produced by: Manickam Narayanan
- Starring: R. Sarathkumar; Meena
- Cinematography: M. C. Sekar
- Edited by: P. Mohanraj
- Music by: Suresh Peters
- Production company: Seventh Channel Communications
- Release date: 14 April 1995
- Running time: 156 minutes
- Country: India
- Language: Tamil

Coolie is a 1995 Indian Tamil-language action film directed and written by P. Vasu. The film stars Sarathkumar and Meena in lead roles with Radharavi, Raja and Kavitha Vijayakumar in supporting roles. The film opened in 14 April 1995, fared below critics' expectations and success at the box office.

== Plot ==
Loganathan, a wealthy businessman and factory owner, bribes the leader of the workers' union at his factory, to prevent protests. During a salary negotiation between Loganathan and the union, the union leader pretends to negotiate on behalf of the union while secretly working for Loganathan. However, Karna, a factory worker, gains the support of his colleagues in demanding a larger pay increase and becomes the new union leader.

Karna's sister is a close friend of Loganathan's daughter Vimala, who admires Karna's character. Attempting to influence Karna as he influenced the previous union leader, Loganathan invites Karna to a party and gives him new clothes and a car. Karna damages the car and throws away the clothes, saying that he prefers to stay poor until the factory workers are treated fairly.

Loganathan's son, who is in business with him, falls in love with Karna's sister. The couple marry with Loganathan's support. After the wedding, Loganathan sends his son to work on business in Mumbai, and sends his daughter-in-law to support the business in their home town. Loganathan lies to his daughter-in-law, telling her that he has cancer and needs money for treatment. As a result, Karna's sister becomes a strict businesswoman and begins acting coldly to her brother.

Meanwhile, Karna and Vimala marry against Loganathan's wishes. Karna's sister suspends Karna for a day after he accidentally touches the wrong switch, which temporarily stops work at the factory. Karna fights a fellow worker, who purposely drinks and does wrong in the factory because he was sent by Loganathan to create problems. During the fight, the worker claims that the fight is Karna's fault because Karna is in love with his sister. After hearing this, the workers lose support for Karna.

Loganathan plans to burn the factory down in order to receive an insurance payment. His plan is revealed by the worker who fought Karna. Loganathan plots with the old union leader to murder Karna. However, the old union leader plans to murder Loganathan as well, since Loganathan had previously refused to help free him from jail. The old union leader breaks into Loganathan's house, beats him, and runs a jeep over Loganathan's legs, but Karna enters and saves Loganathan's life.

At the end of the film, Loganathan is in a wheelchair and has become a better person. He accepts Karna's marriage to Vimala.

== Cast ==
- Sarathkumar as Karna
- Meena as Vimala
- Kavitha Vijayakumar as Thulasi
- Raja
- Radharavi as Loganathan
- Manorama
- Goundamani as Periyasamy /Velusamy / Madasamy
- Senthil as Ponnusamy /Munusamy / Munusamy's son
- Nagendra Prasad in a special appearance in the song "Ye Rammu Rammu"
- Ponnambalam as old union leader
- Sridhar as a dancer in the song "Ye Rammu"
- Dinesh as a dancer in the song "Ye Rammu"

== Production ==
This was the only film appearance of Kavitha, daughter of the actor Vijayakumar.

== Soundtrack ==
The music was composed by Suresh Peters, a former associate of A. R. Rahman. The film marked his debut as a music composer and he reused some tunes from his album Minnal.

Track listing
No.	Title	Lyrics	Singer(s)	Length
1.	"Ada Kattu Katta"	John Peter	Suresh Peters
2.	"Poo Poova Poothiruku"	Vairamuthu	S. P. Balasubrahmanyam, Swarnalatha
3.	"Raja Raja Chozhan"	Vairamuthu	Mano, Swarnalatha
4.	"Selai Ini Vendam"	Vairamuthu	Mano, Suja Arun
5.	"Yeh Rammu Rammu"	Vairamuthu	Mano, Suresh Peters
