= Poramboku =

- Directed by: Srinivas
- Written by: Ramesh Gopi (dialogues)
- Produced by: Krishna Reddy
- Starring: Navdeep; Ekta Khosla
- Cinematography: Jawahar Reddy
- Edited by: K. V. Krishna Reddy
- Music by: Mani Sharma
- Production company: Tollywood Talkies
- Release date: 26 January 2007
- Country: India
- Language: Telugu

Poramboku is a 2007 Indian Telugu drama film directed by Krishna Reddy starring Navdeep and Ekta Khosla. The film was released on 26 January 2007. The film was dubbed into Hindi as Ek Aur Aflatoon.

== Plot ==
Karthik wants to become a film hero as his mother claimed that he was like a hero. As his mother dies in his childhood, Karthik's sister brings him up like mother. Karthik wants to join in a Film Institute but he has to pay Rs 1 lakh towards the fee. Chaitra (Ekta Khosla) reaches their village claiming that she was planning to do a telefilm. As she is rich, Karthik and his friends try to cash in on the opportunity. Chaitra's foster mother learns that she is in Dosakayalapalli and sends goons. But, Chaitra escapes from the place without any notice to Karthik. Finally Karthik reaches Hyderabad with the help of his sister and meets Chaitra in a dramatic turn of events. Karthik starts his efforts and finally gets the chance as a hero in a film. Again the goons attack Chaitra and try to whisk her away only to get saved by Karthik. Chaitra reveals her flashback. Her foster mother who brought her up plans to snatch her property by getting Chaitra married to her brother Satti. When Karthik was about to face the camera, that woman demands Chaitra. But Karthik categorically tells her that he is in love with her. Though Chaitra decides to sacrifice herself to make Karthik a winner, she could not hide her love. Finally Karthik wins her love and Chaitra's foster mother realizes her folly.

== Cast ==
- Navdeep as Karthik
- Ekta Khosla as Chaitra
- Vadivukkarasi as Chaitra's foster mother
- Suman Shetty
- Brahmanandam
- Narsing Yadav
- Satyam Rajesh
- Dharmavarapu Subrahmanyam
- M. S. Narayana
- Ali
- Kondavalasa Lakshmana Rao
- Raghu Babu
- Lakshmipati
- Gundu Hanumantha Rao
- Venu Madhav
- Kavitha

== Production ==
The film was directed by Srinivas, who earlier directed Ninu Choodaka Nenundalenu. Two songs were shot in Malaysia.

== Soundtrack ==
The film has six songs composed by Mani Sharma.

- Evevo Ragale - Kalyani
- Bangaram Ithey - Shankar Mahadevan, Rita
- High Voltage - Mallikarjun Mansur, Kalyani
- Andam Nadhi - Murali, Kalpana Patowary
- Chinnari Pavurama - Sujatha Mohan
