= Aaya Vada Sutta Kadhai =

2015 Indian Tamil film by N Phanindra

- Official poster
- Directed by: N. Phanindra
- Written by: N. Phanindra
- Starring: Avitej; Suparna; Manoharan; Sai Prashanth; Mani
- Cinematography: Balaji S. P.
- Edited by: Vijay V.
- Music by: Shameer; Siva
- Production company: Pixl Films Production
- Release date: 20 March 2015
- Country: India
- Language: Tamil

Aaya Vada Sutta Kadhai (transl. The story of the grandmother who fried a vadai) is a 2015 Indian Tamil-language crime comedy film directed by N. Phanindra starring Avitej, Suparna, Manoharan, Sai Prashanth and Mani.

== Cast ==
- Avitej as Mani
- Suparna as Renu
- Manoharan K. as Duraipandi
- Sai Prashanth as a gangster
- Rajesh
- Mani as Kumar
- Seenu
- Shoban
- Murali
- Thangam
- Suruli Mohan
- Nesan
- Natesh
- Rajarajan
- Muhammad Khan
- Senthil
- Rathina Kumar
- Seshadri
- Sathish
- Babu

== Production ==
The film's title is an adaptation of the short story of the same name and is about a grandmother living in a flat. Bengali actress Supurna makes her Tamil debut with this film. Avitej and Supurna previously worked on a Telugu film prior to this film. The whole film was shot in a flat in Ambattur.

== Release and reception ==
The film released with seven other Tamil films.

M. Suganth of The Times of India said that "Characters are double crossed, morals are forgotten and confusion reigns but the film doesn’t find the screwball tone that is required for this material". On the contrary, Malini Mannath of The New Indian Express opined that "The twist towards the end is appreciable. For jut [sic] about 113 minutes of viewing time, the film is a pleasant watch".
