= Saravana =

2006 film by K. S. Ravikumar

- Theatrical release poster
- Directed by: K. S. Ravikumar
- Screenplay by: K. S. Ravikumar
- Story by: Boyapati Srinu
- Based on: Bhadra (Telugu)
- Produced by: Amudha Durairaj
- Starring: Silambarasan; Jyothika
- Cinematography: Arthur A. Wilson
- Edited by: K. Thanikachalam
- Music by: Srikanth Deva
- Production company: Deivanai Movies
- Release date: 14 January 2006
- Running time: 174 minutes
- Country: India
- Language: Tamil

Saravana (alternatively spelled as Saravanaa) is a 2006 Indian Tamil-language action romance film directed by K. S. Ravikumar. It stars Silambarasan, Jyothika, Five Star Krishna, Vivek, and Prakash Raj. The film was produced by Deivanai Movies and the soundtrack was composed by Srikanth Deva. It is a remake of the 2005 Telugu film Bhadra. Saravana was released on 14 January 2006, coinciding with Pongal and became a commercial success.

== Plot ==
Saravana is a college student who returns to his home for his sister Divya's wedding with a distraught and frightened girl named Sadhana, whom Saravana introduces as his friend to his family. While the marriage preparation continues, everyone begins to wonder what Sadhana's relationship is to Saravana. Saravana's uncle Purushothaman begins to lose his emotions as he wants Saravana to marry his daughter. Purushothaman confronts Sadhana, who gets upset and an argument ensues. While at a restaurant, Saravana and Sadhana are confronted by a gang. Saravana chases the gang and thrashes them. Realizing that he has left Sadhana behind, Saravana returns to the restaurant, but finds that Sadhana is not there. Saravana's father Bhoopathi confronts Saravana and forces him to reveal about Sadhana's identity, where Saravana reveals his past.

Past: Saravana and Krishna are best friends, who visits Krishna's home village. Sadhana, who returns from London, is impressed by Saravana, who continually impresses her based on her tastes. He gets along well with Krishna's and Sadhana's family. Saravana convinces them that he would make a prospective groom for Sadhana. Sadhana's family, mainly her brother Soundarapandiyan and his sidekick Velu are involved in regional gangs in their village. When Sadhana takes Saravana to the temple for a visit without Soundarapandiyan's knowledge, a rival gang member group, headed by Duraisingam, is attacked by Velu's group members, and Duraisingam's brother Vanjaravelu gets hold of Sadhana and threatens to kill her. In a swift action of bravery and skill, Saravana knocks down Vanjaravelu. After this incident, Soundarapandiyan tells Saravana about the violent happenings in the village.

Soundarapandiyan explains how he and his wife are master's degree holder from BITS Pilani. Unfortunately, due to the nature of the villages, the rivalry is deadly and fatal. He ultimately says that even though the villages are violent, he will remain a noble person with high ideals. After a few days though, in the most ungrateful manner and a show cowardice, Duraisingam's gang fights with fierce brutality, and they finishes Krishna's entire family except Sadhana. Saravana promises to Soundarapandiyan that he will take up the responsibility of Sadhana. In the process, Saravana also becomes Duraisingam's rival as he kills Vanjaravelu to protect Sadhana. When Duraisingam finds out that Vanjaravelu was killed by Saravana, he decides to kill him instead of Sadhana.

Present: Velu trace Sadhana and bring her to Saravana's home. Feeling that she is not safe here anymore, Saravana plans to send her to London, but Sadhana is not happy with his decision as she loves him. On the day of the flight, Sadhana meets Saravana and Krishna's friend at the airport. The girl tells Sadhana about Saravana's devotion for her. She also knows that Sadhana's family chose Saravana as Sadhana's bridegroom before they were killed. Sadhana realizes she cannot leave Saravana and leaves the airport. She manages to find Saravana, who is fighting Duraisingam and his men. After Saravana defeats Duraisingam, he and Sadhana happily reunite and leave, while Duraisingam is killed by Velu.

== Cast ==
- Silambarasan as Saravana
- Jyothika as Sadhana
- Five Star Krishna as Krishna
- Prakash Raj as Soundarapandi Thevar
- Vivek as V. C. Damodaran (VCD)
- Eashwari Rao as Uma Maheshwari, Soundarapandi's wife
- Ravi Kale as Duraisingam Thevar
- Radha Ravi as Bhoopathi, Saravana's father
- Sriranjani as Lakshmi, Saravana's mother
- Nagesh as Varadharajan, Saravana's grandfather
- Nizhalgal Ravi as Purushothaman, Saravana's uncle
- Tharika as Divya, Saravanaa's elder sister
- Devadarshini as Amudha, Saravana's elder sister-in-law
- Meghna Naidu as Sathya, Saravana's cousin
- Brahmaji as Velu, Soundarapandi's sidekick
- Subbaraju as Vanjaravelu Thevar, Duraisingam's younger brother
- Akhila as Savithri, Velu's younger sister and Krishna's lover
- Ponnambalam as Veerapandi Thevar
- Cell Murugan as Police Inspector T. Manavalaan
- Besant Ravi as Manikkam
- Master Bharath as Deepak, Saravana's nephew
- K. S. Ravikumar as Man in Train (special appearance)

== Production ==
Amudha Durairaj produced this film under the banner Deivanai Movies. This is the second collaboration of Silambarasan and Jyothika after the success of Manmadhan (2004). Saravana is the remake of Telugu flick Bhadra, which has Prakash Raj, Easwari Rao, Brahmaji, and Subbaraju re-enacting their roles they had played in the original Telugu version. A song was shot with Meghna Naidu and Silambarasan on sets erected at AVM, Prasad Studios and Mohan Studios.

== Soundtrack ==
There are six songs composed by Srikanth Deva in his second collaboration with Silambarasan after Kuthu (2004). The song "Saa Boo Three" was reused from the song "Sa Sye" from the original Telugu film. The song “Gori Thera” features the song "Don't Phunk with My Heart" by the American hip-hop group Black Eyed Peas during the introduction.

Song	Singers	Lyrics
"Gori Thera"	Silambarasan, Sunitha Sarathy	P. Vijay
"Kadhal Keedhal"	Ranjith, Reshmi, Silambarasan, Premgi Amaren	Vaali
"Kadhal Sutthudhe"	Naresh Iyer, Sadhana Sargam	Kabilan
"Kadhal Vandhum"	V. V. Prasanna, Saindhavi	Thenmozhi
"Saa Poo Three Pottu"	Karthik, Harini, Anuradha Sriram, Baby Vaishali	Na. Muthukumar
"Unnodu Purushanaga"	Sukhwinder Singh, Rita	Snehan

== Reception ==
The Hindu wrote that the film "opens with the hero's entry in typical filmi style and his sermons on (what else can it be?) love! Thankfully things take off on a serious plane q uite soon. Writer-director K. S. Ravikumar and Silambarasan come together for the first time in this Telugu remake, and with ample scope to sing and dance, love and laugh and fight and cry, Simbu makes his presence felt in every frame". Lajjavathi of Kalki wrote "The director has tried a drippy action on one side and a family drama on the other but the screenplay falters as the story relies on flashback. Is it the way for directors like KS Ravikumar to go backwards when Tamil cinema is heading towards new route in terms of ideas and making? Is it worth it?"
