= Subbaraju =

Indian actor

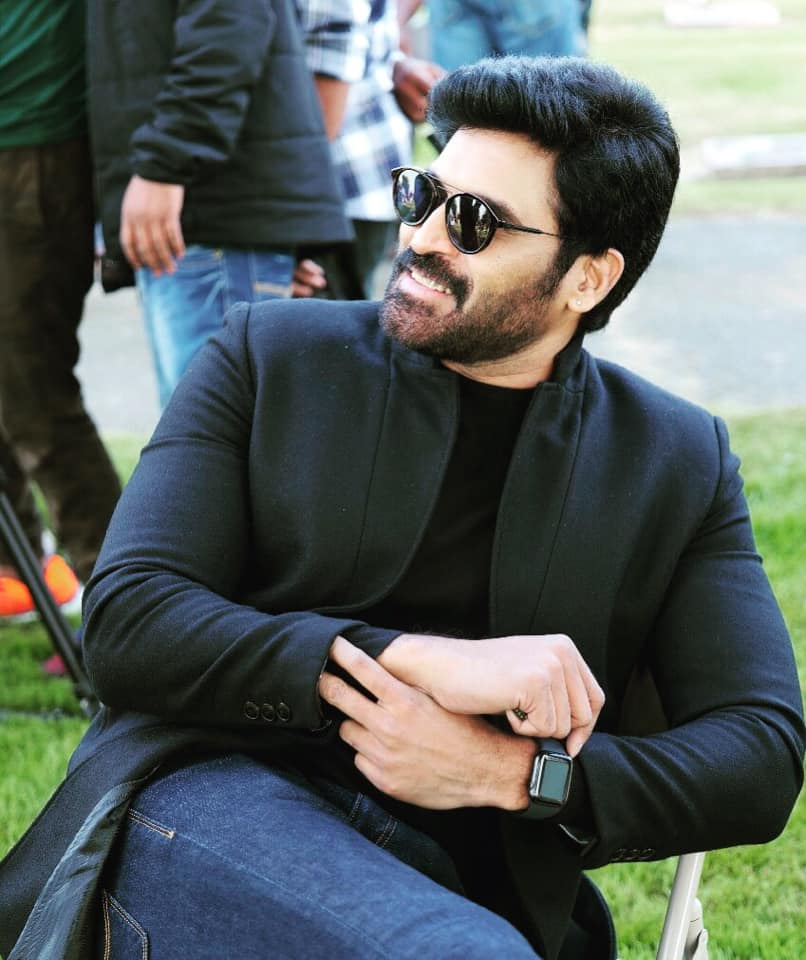
- Subbaraju in 2019
- Born: Penmetsa Subbaraju; 27 February 1977 (age 49); Bhimavaram, Andhra Pradesh, India
- Occupation: Actor
- Years active: 2002-present
- Spouse: Sravanthi Tapal (2024-present)

Penmetsa Subbaraju is an Indian actor who predominantly works in Telugu cinema, as well as Tamil, Malayalam and Hindi cinema. Subbaraju has played a variety of roles, from negative to supporting characters.

== Early life ==
Subbaraju was born in Bhimavaram, to Penmatsa Ramakrishnam Raju and Vijayalakshmi. Subbaraju did his education at D. N. R. College, Bhimavaram. He did his bachelor's degree in Mathematics before doing a computer course and joining Dell Computers, Hyderabad.

== Career ==
His most notable works include Amma Nanna O' Tamil Ammayi, Arya, Pokiri, Leader, Bbuddah... Hoga Terra Baap, Businessman, Mirchi, Baahubali 2: The Conclusion, Temper, Duvvada Jagannadham, Geetha Govindam, and Majili. Subbaraju is immensely popular in Japan for his role as Kumara Varma in the 2017 epic action film, Baahubali: The Conclusion.

== Personal life ==
Subbaraju is known to keep his personal life private. On 26 November 2024, Subbaraju shared via Instagram that he had tied the knot to Dr. Sravanthi Tapal in Florida, United States. Sravanthi is a dentist by profession.

== Filmography ==
Key
†	Denotes films that have not yet been released

=== Telugu ===
Year	Title	Role	Notes
2002	Khadgam		
2003	Amma Nanna O Tamila Ammayi	Anand	
2003	Guest House		
2004	Sri Anjaneyam	Thadu gang leader	
2004	Nenunnanu	Arun	
2004	Arya	Subbu	
2004	Samba	Pasupathi's brother	
2004	Chanti	Sarvarayudu's brother-in-law	
2004	Suryam	Badhram	
2005	Relax	Veerendra	
2005	Sadaa Mee Sevalo	MLA Ravindra Babu	
2005	Soggadu	GK	
2005	Subash Chandra Bose	Rajaratnam	
2005	Jagapati	Bandaraju	
2005	Allari Pidugu	Shankar	
2005	Bhadra	Tulasi	
2006	Shock	Nagesh	
2006	Pokiri	"Indira Nagar" Mallesh	
2006	Pournami	Nagendra's son	
2006	Game	Police Officer	
2006	Stalin	Goon	Cameo appearance
2007	Desamuduru	Murugesan	
2007	Yogi	Saidulu	
2007	Sri Mahalakshmi	A.C.P	
2007	Tulasi	Ravi	
2007	Athidhi	Ganni Bhai	
2008	Okka Magaadu	CBI Officer's assistant	
2008	Pourudu	Hussain	
2008	Gautama Buddha	Ajatha Shatru	
2008	Parugu	Chinnabhai	
2008	Kantri	Bhyraagi	
2008	Bujjigadu	Venkat	
2008	Sangamam		
2008	Maa Ayana Chanti Pilladu	Veerababu	
2008	Baladoor	Veera	
2008	Raksha	Vinay	
2008	Deepavali	Inspector Ramesh	
2008	Neninthe	Mallik	
2009	Sasirekha Parinayam	Aranam	
2009	Siddham	Ashok	
2009	Billa	Vikram	Cameo appearance
2010	Khaleja	Govardhan	
2010	Namo Venkatesa	Bhadrappa	
2010	Bindaas	Sailendra	
2010	Seetharamula Kalyanam	Bujji	
2010	Leader	Dhanunjay	
2010	Pappu	Detective Ram	
2011	Golconda High School	Kiriti Das	
2011	Wanted	Shiva	
2011	Aha Naa Pellanta	Sanjana's brother	50th film
2011	Dongala Mutha	Hotel Receptionist	
2011	Nenu Naa Rakshasi	Inspector Vikram	
2011	Dookudu	Dinesh Goud	
2011	Madatha Kaja	Ajay	
2011	Panjaa	Ashok	
2012	Businessman	Jaidev's assistant	
2012	Bodyguard	Shankaram	
2012	Dhenikaina Ready	Narasimha Naidu's brother	
2012	Devudu Chesina Manushulu	CI Subbaraju	
2013	Mirchi	Poorna	
2013	Shadow	Sanyasi Naidu	
2013	Iddarammayilatho	Shawar Ali's brother	
2013	Kamina	Siva	
2014	Bhimavaram Bullodu	Kondapalli Suri	
2014	Power	Rajeev	
2014	Yevadu	Raja	
2015	Temper	Ravi	
2015	Srimanthudu	Ravikanth's brother	
2016	Shourya	Netra's uncle	
2016	Srirastu Subhamastu	ACP Anand	
2017	Rogue	Encounter specialist	
2017	Baahubali 2: The Conclusion	Kumara Varma	
2017	Duvvada Jagannadham	Royyala Avinash aka Chanti	
2017	Patel S. I. R.	ACP Viswas	
2017	Jawaan	Iqbal	
2018	Nela Ticket	Aditya's brother	
2018	Raju Gadu	Gopi	
2018	Lover		
2018	Aatagallu	DCP Nayak	
2018	Geetha Govindam	Phaneendra	
2019	F2: Fun and Frustration	Ravindranath	
2019	Mr. Majnu	Ramesh Babu	
2019	Majili	Bhushan	
2019	Gaddalakonda Ganesh	Prabhakar's henchman	
2020	Sarileru Neekevvaru	Koti	Cameo appearance
2020	Nishabdham	Vivek	
2021	Idhe Maa Katha		
2021	Republic	Vijay Kumar	
2021	Akhanda	A. Bharath Reddy	
2021	Arjuna Phalguna	DFO Subbaraju	
2022	Sarkaru Vaari Paata	Subbaraju	
2022	Chor Bazaar		
2022	Ranga Ranga Vaibhavanga	Rana	
2022	Swathi Muthyam	Bala's AO	
2023	Waltair Veerayya	Edukondalo	
2023	Shaakuntalam	Asura Athikrodhanemi	
2023	Bro	Ramya’s brother	
2023	Rules Ranjann	Sana’a brother	
2023	Bhagavanth Kesari	SP Ravi Krishna	
2024	Valari	Rudra	
2024	Double iSmart	Patrick	
2024	Jithender Reddy	Gopanna	
2025	Jack	Pradeep Ranganathan	
2025	Hari Hara Veera Mallu	Abbanna	
2025	Baahubali: The Epic	Kumara Varma	
2026	Don't Trouble the Trouble	SI Krishna	

=== Tamil ===
Year	Title	Role	Notes
2004	M. Kumaran S/O Mahalakshmi	Anand	credited as Subburaj
2005	Aayudham	Naaga	
2006	Aathi	Robert	
2006	Saravana	Duraisingam's younger brother	
2006	Nenjirukkum Varai	DCP Ayyanar	
2007	Pokkiri	"Korattur" Logu	
2014	Thalaivan	ACP	
2017	Baahubali 2: The Conclusion	Kumara Varma	partially reshot version
2020	Asuraguru	ACP Manickavasagam	
2025	Madha Gaja Raja	Rajesh	

=== Kannada ===
Year	Title	Role
2005	Nammanna	Marigudi
2008	Gaja	
2008	Satya In Love	Veda's Elder Brother (Telugu Factionist)
2011	Sanchari	
2017	Rogue	Encounter specialist

=== Other languages ===
Year	Title	Role	Language	Notes
2005	Thaskara Veeran	Smuggler	Malayalam	
2008	Tathagatha Buddha	Ajatha Shatru	Hindi	Bilingual film
2011	Bbuddah... Hoga Terra Baap	Tedha	Hindi	
2013	Sound Thoma	SI Rakesh	Malayalam	

=== Television ===
Year	Title	Role	Language	Network	Notes	Ref.
2025	Devika & Danny		Telugu	JioHotstar		
