= Premigalige MMCH =

MMCH
- Official poster
- Directed by: Mussanje Mahesh
- Starring: Meghana Raj; Samyukta Hornad; Prathama; Nakshatra; Ragini Dwivedi
- Cinematography: Nagesh Acharya
- Music by: V Sridhar Sambhram
- Release date: 13 July 2018
- Country: India
- Language: Kannada

Premigalige MMCH is a 2018 Indian mystery-action thriller film directed by Mussanje Mahesh and starring Meghana Raj, Samyukta Hornad, Prathama, Nakshatra and Ragini Dwivedi. The film was dubbed in Telugu as Real Danduplayalm.

== Cast ==
- Meghana Raj as Megha
- Prathama as Maya
- Samyukta Hornad as Chaya
- Nakshatra as Harshitha
- Ragini Dwivedi as Jhansi Rani

== Music ==
The music for the film was composed by V. Sridhar Sambhram.

Track listing
No.	Title	Lyrics	Singer(s)	Length
1.	"Megha Megha"	Ghouse Peer	Shreya Ghoshal	4:31
2.	"Challore Chamka"	V. Nagendra Prasad	Apoorva Sridhar, Rashmi N. Murthy	4:43
3.	"Adrustakkondu Enhi Beku"	V. Sridhar Sambhram	Kailash Kher	4:37
4.	"Gaali Beesi"	Ghouse Peer	Anup Dayanand	4:15
5.	"Megha Megha Karaoke"	—	—	4:31
6.	"Adrustakkondu Karaoke"	—	—	4:37
Total length:				27:14

== Reception ==
A critic from Deccan Chronicle wrote that "The only relief is watching women in action from beginning to end". A critic from The News Minute wrote that "Inconsistencies plague the movie, and there’s not a moment that lets you enjoy the proceedings". A critic from The Times of India wrote that "Director Mussanje Mahesh’s attempt to make a crime-thriller, female-centric movie based on a true story of the 1980s falls flat". A critic from Bangalore Mirror wrote that "This film has a bearable first half which makes way for a silly second half and finally assaults you with an embarrassing climax".
