= Friends Book =

- Film poster
- Directed by: R. P. Patnaik
- Written by: R. P. Patnaik
- Produced by: Vijay Prasad Malla
- Starring: Nishal; Nanduri Uday; Surya Teja; Gemini Suresh; Archana Sharma; Archana Shetty
- Cinematography: Abhinandan Ramanujam
- Edited by: Vijay Anand Vadigi
- Music by: R. P. Patnaik
- Production company: Wellfare Creations
- Release date: 13 April 2012
- Country: India
- Language: Telugu

Friends Book is a 2012 Indian Telugu-language suspense drama film directed by R. P. Patnaik (who also composed the music). The film stars Nishal, Nanduri Uday, Surya Teja, Gemini Suresh, Archna Sharma and Archana Shetty. The film was a box office failure.

== Cast ==
- Nishal as Nischal
- Nanduri Uday as Akshay
- Surya Teja as Surya
- Gemini Suresh
- Archna Sharma as Nithya
- Archana Shetty as Madhu
- Suresh as Raja
- Rao Ramesh as Police Inspector
- Chalapathi Rao as DGP R. Krishna Swamy
- Bhimaneni Srinivasa Rao
- Soori as "Millionaire" Venugopal
- Visweswara Rao as Doctor

== Production ==
The film was initially titled Facebook and is about six friends. The film marked the Telugu debut of Archna Sharma, who plays a former investigative officer.

== Reception ==
A critic from The Times of India gave the film a rating of three-and-a-half out of five stars and wrote that "The first half appeared to drag a bit, but as the mystery deepens, it could be an edge-of-the-seat thriller".
