= Bhadra (2005 film) =

2005 Telugu film by Boyapati Srinu

- Directed by: Boyapati Srinu
- Written by: Story & Screenplay: Boyapati Srinu; Dialogues: Ravi-Siva
- Produced by: Dil Raju
- Starring: Ravi Teja; Meera Jasmine
- Cinematography: Arthur A. Wilson
- Edited by: Marthand K. Venkatesh
- Music by: Devi Sri Prasad
- Production company: Sri Venkateswara Creations
- Distributed by: Sri Venkateswara Creations
- Release date: 12 May 2005
- Country: India
- Language: Telugu
- Box office: ₹15 crore distributors' share

Bhadra: The True Lover is a 2005 Indian Telugu-language romantic action comedy film directed by debutant Boyapati Srinu. Produced by Sri Venkateswara Creations, the film stars Ravi Teja and Meera Jasmine, while Arjan Bajwa (credited as Deepak), Prakash Raj, and Pradeep Rawat play supporting roles. The film has music composed by Devi Sri Prasad with cinematography and editing by Arthur A. Wilson and Marthand K. Venkatesh respectively. The film was a Blockbuster at the box-office collecting a distributor's share of ₹15 crore.

It has been dubbed in Hindi and Bhojpuri as Badla and in Malayalam as Brahmam. The film was later remade in Tamil as Saravana (2006), Kannada as Gaja (2008), in Bengali as Josh, and Bangladeshi Bengali as Bhalobeshe Morte Pari (both in 2010).

== Plot ==
Bhadra is a college student who returns to his home for his sister's wedding with Anu, a distraught and frightened girl, whom Bhadra introduces as his friend to his family. While the marriage preparation continues, everyone begins to suspect Anu. Bhadra's uncle begins to lose his emotions as he wants Bhadra to marry his daughter. Bhadra's uncle confronts Anu, who gets upset and an argument ensues. While at a restaurant, Bhadra and Anu are confronted by a gang. Bhadra chases the gang and thrashes them. Realizing that he has left Anu behind, Bhadra returns to the restaurant, but finds that Anu is not there. Bhadra's father confronts Bhadra and forces him to reveal about Anu's identity, where Bhadra reveals his past.

Past: Bhadra and Raja are best friends, who visits Raja's home village. Anu, who returns from London, is impressed by Bhadra, who continually impresses her based on her tastes. He gets along well with Raja's and Anu's family. Bhadra convinces them that he would make a prospective groom for Anu. Anu's family, mainly her brother Surendra and cousin are involved in regional gangs in their village. When Anu takes Bhadra to the temple for a visit without Surendra's knowledge, a rival gang member group is attacked by Anu's cousin's group members, and one member of the rival group gets hold of Anu and threatens to kill her. In a swift action of bravery and skill, Bhadra knocks down the rival group member. After this incident, Surendra tells Bhadra about the violent happenings in the village. Surendra explains how he and his wife are master's degree holder from BITS Pilani. Unfortunately, due to the nature of the villages, the rivalry is deadly and fatal. He ultimately says that even though the villages are violent, he will remain a noble person with high ideals. After a few days though, in the most ungrateful manner and a show cowardice, the rival gang fights with fierce brutality, and the rival gang leader Veerayya finishes Raja's entire family except Anu. Bhadra promises to Surendra that he will take up the responsibility of Anu. In the process, Bhadra also becomes Veerayya's rival as he kills his younger brother Tulasi to protect Anu. When Veerayya finds out that Tulasi was killed by Bhadra, he decides to kill him instead of Anu.

Present: Surendra's men trace Anu and bring her to Bhadra's home. Feeling that she is not safe here anymore, Bhadra plans to send her to London, but Anu is not happy with his decision as she loves him. On the day of the flight, Anu meets Bhadra and Raja's friend at the airport. The girl tells Anu about Bhadra's devotion for her. She also knows that they chose Bhadra as Anu's bridegroom before her family was killed. Anu realizes she cannot leave Bhadra and leaves the airport. She manages to find Bhadra, who is fighting Veerayya and his men. After Bhadra defeats Veerayya, he and Anu happily reunite and leave, while Veerayya is killed by Surendra's henchman.

== Cast ==
- Ravi Teja as Veerabhadra (Bhadra)
- Meera Jasmine as Anuradha (Anu)
- Arjan Bajwa as Rajendra "Raja"
- Prakash Raj as Surendra
- Pradeep Rawat as Veerayya
- Telangana Shakuntala as Shakuntala
- Easwari Rao as Surendra's wife
- Subbaraju as Tulasi
- Sunil as Bullabbayi
- Murali Mohan as Bhadra's father
- Sudha as Bhadra's mother
- Raja Ravindra as Bhadra's brother
- Revathi as Bhadra's sister
- Sanober Herekar Aziz as Satya
- Brahmaji as Basava
- Jeeva as Narayana
- Deepthi Nallamothu as Renu
- Surekha Vani as Bhadra’s sister-in-law
- Jhansi
- Padmanabham
- Gundu Hanumantha Rao
- Raghunatha Reddy
- Shanoor Sana
- Vizag Prasad
- Linda Arsenio as an item number

== Production ==
Boyapati Srinivas Chowdary, cousin of Posani Krishna Murali and erstwhile assistant director of Muthyala Subbaiyah directed this film. The script was narrated to Dil Raju who immediately okayed the script and started production of the film. Firstly script went to Allu Arjun but due to some reasons didn't go then Jr. NTR and Prabhas were also considered for the lead roles. Finally, Ravi Teja got selected as the male lead. The film was made in a moderate budget of 5 to 6 crores.

== Soundtrack ==
Music was scored by Devi Sri Prasad and released by Aditya Music.

Bhadra

Soundtrack album by Devi Sri Prasad
- Released: April 23, 2005
- Recorded: 2005
- Genre: Feature film soundtrack
- Length: 31:11
- Language: Telugu
- Label: Aditya Music
- Producer: Devi Sri Prasad

Devi Sri Prasad chronology
Sachein (2005)	Bhadra (2005)	Andarivaadu (2005)

Track listing
No.	Title	Lyrics	Singer(s)	Length
1.	"Just Do It"	Sirivennela	Tippu, Tanvi Shah	4:21
2.	"Sa Sa Sye"	Sirivennela	Karthik, K. S. Chitra	4:20
3.	"Nuvvu Naaku Manasisthe"	Kulasekhar	Mallikarjun, Sumangali	4:59
4.	"Thirumala Vaasa"	Sirivennela	Sumangali	2:09
5.	"O Manasa"	Sirivennela	Ravi Varma	4:03
6.	"Yerrakoka Pachcharaika"	Bhaskarabhatla Ravi Kumar	Pushpavanam Kuppusamy, Usha	4:20
7.	"Ye Oore Chinnadana"	Viswa	Tippu, Kalpana	5:06
8.	"Thirumala Vaasa" (Instrumental)		Veena by Devi	1:47
Total length:				31:11

== Remakes ==
The film was later remade into Tamil as Saravana (2006), with Silambarasan and Jyothika; in Kannada as Gaja (2008) with Darshan; in Bengali as Josh (2010) and in Bangladeshi Bengali as Bhalobeshe Morte Pari (2010) with Shakib Khan.

== Reviews ==
Idlebrain wrote: "Bhadra is an average formula film, which runs on the strengths of Ravi Teja". Fullhyd wrote: "Bhadra is another version of the kind of chug-a-lug entertainment that made Idiot and Amma Nanna O Tamil Ammayi worthy of a mention in conversations that are going nowhere". Sify wrote: "The basic problem of Bhadra is that it is a poor clone of Okkadu and there is hardly anything new in presentation and packaging". Indiaglitz wrote: "The problem for Bhadra is tries to be masala film among masala films ---- it incorporates all the big elements". Telugucinema wrote: "Bhadra more concentrates on lighter aspect in the first half and soon drifts into mundane faction drama in the second half. It is laced with clichéd faction film formulae, Tata Sumo chases, killings and counter killings, flashback method, and gory".
