= Thozhi =

- Directed by: Elango Lakshman
- Written by: S. P. Rajprabhu
- Produced by: K. Manickavasakam
- Starring: Prabha; Dwaraka; Shyam Ganesh; Manikka Vinayagam
- Cinematography: S. Bala
- Edited by: P. Keerthy Mohan; Sathyaraj
- Music by: R. Shankar
- Production company: Sree V Pictures
- Release date: 11 December 2009
- Running time: 125 minutes
- Country: India
- Language: Tamil

Thozhi (transl. Female Friend) is a 2009 Indian Tamil language romantic drama film directed by Elango Lakshman. The film stars Prabha and newcomer Dwaraka, Shyam Ganesh and Manikka Vinayagam, with Tirupur Selvaraj, Bharath, Venkat and Vijaya Manohari playing supporting roles. The film, produced by K. Manickavasakam, was released on 11 December 2009.

== Plot ==
The film revolves around four lead characters: Chinnu, Saranya, Arun Vijay and Saranya's father who are travelling separately in the same train.

The orphan Chinnu was the main singer in a music troupe and his best friend Shiva was the guitarist. One day, Chinnu met the college student Saranya in a wedding function and she beautifully sang a song with the music troupe. Later, Chinnu needed a female singer for a function and asked Saranya to sing as a last resort. Not being a professional singer, she first refused but then, she accepted when he begged her. During the function, Chinnu sang tunes which irked Saranya and made her angry, she humiliated Chinnu and left the stage. The public expressed its unhappiness with the fiasco and the owner of the music troupe scolded him for tarnishing his reputation thus Chinnu lost his job. Chinnu met Saranya to apologize for his mistake and Shiva revealed that his friend was in love with her.

Saranya was leading a peaceful life until she met Shiva, she felt guilty and upset for spoiling Chinnu's life. Saranya then apologized for her action. Shiva decided to stop singing after the public humiliation but Saranya motivated him and she taught him carnatic music. They eventually fell in love with each other. Chinnu then got an opportunity to sing in a film in Chennai thanks to Arun Vijay. Arun Vijay was a rich businessman and owner of audio recording studios who fell in love at first sight with Saranya. With his family, Arun Vijay met her family to get engaged to her. She later fled from her home to marry her lover Chinnu. In the meantime, Saranya's father who could not stop the marriage was looking for her.

The four arrives in Chennai for different purposes. Chinnu and Saranya then meet up and stay together in the house of Saranya's friend. The day of the audition, Chinnu comes across Saranya's father who fainted in the street and takes him to the hospital without knowing his identity. Arun Vijay scolds Chinnu for being irresponsible and tells him to forget his dream to become a playback singer. Saranya's father then thanks Chinnu for his help, while Saranya rebukes him for being so naive. Afterwards, Arun Vijay gives him another chance to sing and Saranya goes with Chinnu for a voice test, when she spots Arun Vijay, she is astonished. Chinnu passes the voice test. Chinnu then discovers that the man who saved was Saranya's father and Saranya decides to return home to not spoil Chinnu's life again. Chinnu is heartbroken, he gives up his chance and returns to his village.

At her wedding, Saranya is shocked to see Chinnu who is now a stage singer. When the two talk about their sacrifices, Saranya's father who has listened to their conversation want his daughter to be happy and orders them to elope but Chinnu unexpectedly refuses for not upsetting both families. In a twist of fate, Arun Vijay cancels the marriage. Thereafter, Arun Vijay who had listened to their conversation that day praises the three for being so compassionate. The film ends with Chinnu and Saranya getting together with the blessings of Arun Vijay and Saranya's father.

== Cast ==
- Prabha as Chinnu
- Dwaraka as Saranya
- Shyam Ganesh as Arun Vijay
- Manikka Vinayagam as Saranya's father
- Tirupur Selvaraj
- Bharath as Shiva, Chinnu's friend
- Venkat
- Vijaya Manohari as Arun Vijay's mother
- Archna Sharma
- Hema
- Sumathisri
- Rithu Mangal as Hema, Saranya's friend
- Poobitha
- Lakshmi

== Production ==
Elango Lakshman, director of two TV serials Snegithi and Kalyana Parisu, made his directorial debut with the romantic drama film Thozhi. Prabha, who made his acting debut in Pirappu (2007), was chosen to play the hero while Archna Sharma, a model based in Bihar who was found through a talent search, was selected to play the heroine. R. Shankar composed the music and S. Bala took care of camera work. The film was shot in Theni, Tarapuram and Palani.

== Soundtrack ==
Thozhi

Soundtrack album by R. Shankar
- Released: 2009
- Recorded: 2009
- Genre: Feature film soundtrack
- Length: 24:36
- Label: New Music
- Producer: R. Shankar

The film score and the soundtrack were composed by R. Shankar. The soundtrack, released in 2009, features 6 tracks with lyrics written by Aarur Thamizhnadan, Vimalan and Balamurugan.

Track	Song	Singer(s)	Duration
1	"Anbendra Vaasam"	Haricharan	1:29
2	"Isaiyin Meedhuthan"	Madhu Balakrishnan, Binni Krishnakumar	7:05
3	"Jeans Pant"	R. Shankar	4:49
4	"Naan Engu"	Haricharan	1:49
5	"Sandhana Kuilay" (female)	Kalpana Raghavendar	4:30
6	"Sandhana Kuilay" (male)	Harish Raghavendra	4:54
