= Arya Surya =

2013 Indian film by Rama Narayanan

- Poster
- Directed by: Rama Narayanan
- Written by: Rama Narayanan
- Produced by: Rama Narayanan
- Starring: Srinivasan; Vishnupriyan
- Cinematography: R. Selvaraj
- Edited by: Rajkeerthi
- Music by: Srikanth Deva
- Production company: Sri Thenandal Films
- Release date: 20 September 2013
- Country: India
- Language: Tamil

Arya Surya is a 2013 Indian Tamil comedy film directed by Rama Narayanan. The film stars Srinivasan and Vishnupriyan while Nakshatra, Kovai Sarala and Gangai Amaren play supportive roles.

== Cast ==
- Srinivasan as Aryananda alias Arya
- Vishnupriyan as Suryananda alias Surya
- Nakshatra as Chandragaandha
- Kovai Sarala as Chandralekha
- Gangai Amaren as Kamalasekaran
- Ganeshkar
- Chitra Lakshmanan
- Vennira Aadai Moorthy
- Nalini as Sivagami
- Kovai Senthil

Special appearances in the song "Thagadu Thagadu"

- T. Rajendar as himself
- Mumaith Khan as an item number

== Soundtrack ==
Arya Surya

Soundtrack album by Srikanth Deva
- Released: 2013
- Genre: Feature film soundtrack
- Length: 27:35
- Producer: Srikanth Deva

Srikanth Deva chronology
Thulli Vilayadu (2013)	Arya Surya (2013)	6 (2013)

The music was composed by Srikanth Deva. T. Rajendar sang the song "Thagadu, Thagadu", in which he makes a cameo appearance.

No.	Title	Lyrics	Singer(s)	Length
1.	"Thagadu Thagadu"	Karunanidhi	L. R. Easwari, T. Rajendar	5:33
2.	"Vadapochae"	Viveka	Srinivasan, Velmurugan	4:36
3.	"Star Star"	Piraisoodan	Srikanth Deva, Hemambika	4:10
4.	"Mama"	Viveka	Senthil Dass, Bellie Raj, Hemambika, Surmukhi Raman	4:35
5.	"Sandhegam"	Gana Bala	Gana Bala	1:08
6.	"Kala Kala"	Gaana Dass	Gaana Dass, V. M. Mahalingam	2:36
7.	"Asaaru Vusaaru"	Gaana Dass	Gaana Dass	4:57
Total length:				27:35

== Critical reception ==
The Times of India rated the film one out of five stars saying that "The film feels like a bunch of arbitrary scenes strung together with a slender plot that is just an excuse to show us the antics of Power Star Srinivasan."
