= Sai Prashanth =

Indian actor

- Born: 7 June 1985
- Died: 13 March 2016 (aged 30)
- Occupation: Actor
- Years active: 2003–2016
- Spouse(s): Niranjana (divorced); Sujitha Sai Prashanth

Sai Prashanth (7 June 1985 – 13 March 2016) was an Indian actor, who has appeared in Tamil language films and television serials.

== Career ==
The assignment Sai got was the role of a kid with drawing talents by Muktha Films in the mega serial called Vidya in DDK. while he was studying in Ahobila Mutt Oriental high school, He was called by Gnana Rajasekaran, IAS, to take up the role of young poet Bharathi in his film Bharathi shot in Varanasi to portray his days of education. He did this role along with the famous illustrious Actor Sayaji Shinde of Maharashtra. Coming back from Kasi, he was referred to Bombay Chanakya by Director and cameraman Thangarbachan to do a role in Veettukku veedu looty as a young computer savvy palaghat lad.

But his film career started with recital of the first sloka of the first veda " ganaanaam thvaa...in screen, that too on the banks of Ganges.

Sai Prashanth in entertainment career took up the role of a video jockey on Sun Music abruptly after another anchor had fallen ill. He subsequently applied for a full-time role, got the offer and then moved on to work in television serials.

A playful youth role played by him Annamalai serial by Radaan suddenly changed into a terrific villain role by the new Director CJ Baskar which earned him the name of Junior Nambiar by the masses. As a serial actor, he often played negative roles and collaborated for several ventures with Radhika's productions. Sai Prashanth has also appeared on the reality dance shows Maanada Mayilada and Jodi Number One as a contestant, while he hosted other shows including Dhil Dhil Manadhil.

He has also acted in films including Mundhinam Paartheney (2010), Neram (2013) and Thegidi (2014) in supporting roles. In Vadacurry (2014), he appeared as the lead antagonist.

== Personal life ==
His mother Lalitha Subhash was the former president of Tamil Nadu BJP and was also a member of the Regional Censor Board. He had a daughter, Rakshitha Prashanth, from his first marriage with Niranjana.

Prashanth committed suicide by consuming a poisoned drink at his home on 13 March 2016.

== Filmography ==
=== Films ===
Year	Film	Role	Notes
2002	Basket	Selvam	Malayalam film
2004	Giri	Maavattam's Son	
2005	Thaka Thimi Tha	Sehwag	
2009	Ainthaam Padai	Dinakaran	
2010	Mundhinam Paartheney	Dinesh	
2012	Etho Seithai Ennai	Seenu	
2013	Neram	Vetri's brother-in-law	
2014	Thegidi	Kamalakannan	
2014	Yennamo Yedho	Gautham's brother-in-law	credited as Sai Prakash
2014	Vadacurry	Ravishankar	
2014	Megha	Mugilan's friend	
2015	Aaya Vada Sutta Kadhai	Gangster	
2015	Vere Vazhi Ille		Malaysian film
2016	Saagasam		
2017	Oru Mugathirai	Kishore	

=== Television ===
- Annamalai
- Veetukku Veedu Lootty
- Krishna Cottage
- Selvi
- Arasi
- Muhurtham
- Idhayam
- Magal
- Thamarai
- Muthaaram
- Kasthuri
- Illavarasi
- Anni by KB sir,
- Ma Inti Mahalakshmi - Telugu
- Lakshmi Nivasam
- Vidya in DDK
- Agalya
- Nimmadi by AVM
- Kannadi Pookkal in Vijay
- Vijay TV Jodi no.1 dance show
- Maanada Mayilaada - Dance show in Kalaingar TV.
- Dil Dil Manathil in Kalaignar TV
- Ethirneechchal
- Amul Super Kudumbam a variety show series in Sun TV
- Yazhini by Sundar K Vijayan - a tele film released in UK
- Veedu manaivi makkal a family reality show on celebrities.
