= Gaja (film) =

- DVD Cover
- Directed by: K. Madesh
- Written by: K. V. Raju (Dialogues)
- Screenplay by: K. Madesh
- Based on: Bhadra (2005)
- Produced by: S Srinivasa Murthy; Suresh Gowda
- Starring: Darshan; Navya Nair
- Cinematography: Ramesh Babu
- Edited by: T. Shashi Kumar; Deepu. S. Kumar
- Music by: V. Harikrishna
- Production company: Sri Seetha Byraveshwara productions
- Distributed by: Jayanna Films
- Release date: 11 January 2008
- Running time: 152 minutes
- Country: India
- Language: Kannada

Gaja is a 2008 Indian Kannada-language romantic action drama film directed by K. Madesh. The film stars Darshan in the titular lead role alongside Navya nair. The producers of the film claimed it is based on a story by novelist P. Ramachandra Rao (Chandu). It is a remake of the 2005 Telugu film Bhadra.

== Plot ==
Gaja (Darshan) and Krishna are close friends. Gaja visits Krishna's village for a holiday but encounters some startling events. He discovers that Krishna's brother, Devendra, is embroiled in a feud with a rival faction, which has strained the relationship between the two families. Despite this, Gaja becomes a favorite of Devendra's family and also develops a liking for Shwetha (Navya Nair), Devendra's sister.

In a faction fight, Devendra and his wife are killed. Gaja tries to defuse the situation, but when he realizes that Devendra's entire family is being targeted, he decides to escape with Krishna and Shwetha. However, the rival faction leader's brother kills Krishna. In retaliation, Gaja kills him and flees to Bangalore with Shwetha. A cat-and-mouse game ensues as Gaja is pursued by the faction leaders. Ultimately, Gaja emerges victorious.

== Cast ==
- Darshan as Gajendra "Gaja" Moorthi
- Navya Nair as Shwetha
- Devaraj as Devendra, Shwetha's eldest brother
- Master Hirannaiah as Gaja's grandfather
- Sourav as Krishna, Shwetha's brother
- Srinath as Chandrashekaraiah, Gaja's father
- Pradeep Rawat as Soorappa
- Shobaraj as Shivanna, Devendra's brother
- Sathyajith
- Komal as Gaja's friend
- Tharakesh Patel
- Lambu Nagesh
- Ravi Chetan as Ramachandra Murthy
- Tejaswini Prakash as Varalakshmi
- Aruna Balraj
- Ashalatha
- Ekta Khosla as Satya
- Chitra Shenoy
- Sangeetha
- Malathi Sardeshpande
- Nischitha Gowda as Gaja's cousin
- Hulivana Gangadharayya as Gangadharayya
- Subbaraju
- Ravi Varma
- Chinnayya
- Jaidev
- Bhanu Prakash
- Rakhi Savanth
- Bhavya Bhuvanahalli Chandre Gowda as Suma
- Stunt Siddu
- Shobha Raghavendra

== Production ==
As of October 2007, the shooting for the film was completed.

== Soundtrack ==
The soundtrack was composed by V. Harikrishna. All the lyrics were written by V. Nagendra Prasad.

Track listing
No.	Title	Singer(s)	Length
1.	"Aitalakadi"	Shankar Mahadevan, Shamitha Malnad	4:56
2.	"Bangari Yare Nee"	Jassie Gift, Chaitra H. G.	4:38
3.	"Du Du Duniya"	Tippu	4:20
4.	"Lambuji"	Shaan, K. S. Chitra	4:14
5.	"Mathu Nannolu"	Sonu Nigam, Shreya Ghoshal	5:12
6.	"O Manase"	Kunal Ganjawala	4:37
7.	"Srikarane"	K. S. Chitra	2:02
Total length:			29:59

== Release ==
Gaja was released on 11 January 2008. It was certified 'A' by the censor board.

The songs "Bul Bul" ("Bangari Yare Nee") and the Gaja title track became chartbusters. The former song inspired a film of the same name.

== Reception ==
Sify rated the film 4/5, praising the acting, music, and cinematography. R G Vijayasarathy of Rediff.com gave the film 2 out of 5 stars, stating, "Gaja's main strength is the music of Harikrishna and rich production values. Cameraman Ramesh Babu has to be complimented for his efforts. [...] The only thumbs down to Gaja is the director and producer's claim that their film is an original."

== Box office ==
The film completed 100 days in theatres and became successful at the box office and marking a hit for Darshan career
