= Padai Soozha =

- Directed by: A. S. Prabhu
- Written by: A. S. Prabhu
- Produced by: C. M. K. Farooque Mohammed; L. Purushothaman
- Starring: Ganesh Prasad; Varshini
- Cinematography: S. M. Thangapandian
- Edited by: Antorayan
- Music by: N. Sasikumar
- Production company: Royal Moon Pictures
- Release date: 25 March 2011
- Running time: 140 minutes
- Country: India
- Language: Tamil

Padai Soozha (transl. Surrounded by force) is a 2011 Indian Tamil language masala film directed by A. S. Prabhu. The film stars newcomer Ganesh Prasad and Varshini, with newcomer Abhinay, newcomer Sangeetha, Prasad Raj, Siddique, R. Sundarrajan, Mahanadi Shankar, Sakthivel, Manikandan and Chinrasu playing supporting roles. The film had musical score by N. Sasikumar and was released on 25 March 2011.

== Plot ==
The film begins with Shiva (Ganesh Prasad) being attacked by rowdies and getting admitted to the hospital in a serious condition.

In the past, the college students Shiva and Ashok (Abhinay) are archenemies, but after the college election, they made peace and became good friends. Shiva and Saranya (Varshini) were in love, while Ashok and Swetha (Sangeetha) fell in love with each other. Ashok and Swetha secretly married at the registrar office with the help of Shiva and Saranya. Ashok and Swetha then stayed in a house owned by a kindhearted man (R. Sundarrajan). The local don Adhikesavan (Prasad Raj) wanted to grab their land and killed the innocent Ashok. Shiva and his friends complained to the police inspector and the local politician, but they did nothing because they worked for Adhikesavan. Shiva and his friends then protested against Adhikesavan in the street, and the police arrested them. The district collector Siddique (Siddique) decided to help them and asked them to provide evidence of Adhikesavan's criminal activities. Shiva then sabotaged all his business. Adhikesavan suspected his archenemy Kasi (Mahanadi Shankar) of doing so, and he brutally killed him in broad daylight. Meanwhile, Swetha gave birth to a baby boy. Adhikesavan found out about Shiva's plans, so he killed his friends, and Adhikesavan's henchmen attacked Shiva.

Back to the present, Shiva takes revenge on Adhikesavan by beating his son Mahesh (Manikandan) in front of him until he becomes mentally ill.

== Cast ==
- Ganesh Prasad as Shiva
- Varshini as Saranya
- Abhinay as Ashok
- Sangeetha as Swetha
- Prasad Raj as Adhikesavan
- Siddique as Siddique
- R. Sundarrajan as House owner
- Mahanadi Shankar as Kasi
- Sakthivel as Police Inspector
- Manikandan as Mahesh
- Chinrasu as Chandru
- Kumar
- Anju Mohan
- Ramesh
- R. John Peter
- Nagina in a special appearance

== Production ==
A. S. Prabhu made his directorial debut with Padai Soozha under the banner of AGR Right Films. Newcomer Ganesh Prasad (Vijjith), who hailed from Coimbatore, was cast to play the hero while Varshini was chosen to play the heroine. Prasad Raj, the brother of actor Prakash Raj, was selected to play the villain.

== Soundtrack ==
The soundtrack was composed by N. Sasikumar.

Track listing
No.	Title	Writer(s)	Singer(s)	Length
1.	"Naa Akanaanuru"	Karuppusamy	K. Karna, Ganga Sitharasu	5:16
2.	"Arabu Desa Pookkal"	Muthu Vijayan	K. Velu	5:52
3.	"Rangoli Rattinam"	Madhura Kavi	Sangeetha	5:00
4.	"Tight Jeans"	Madhura Kavi	Pavan, Nitha	5:16
5.	"Unodu Vazhtheda"	N. Sasikumar	N. Sasikumar	1:29
Total length:				25:51
