= Uyirin Yedai 21 Ayiri =

- Directed by: Yegan
- Written by: Yegan; Manian Pradeep (dialogues)
- Produced by: A Dreamer World
- Starring: Yegan; Thilakan; Vinitha
- Cinematography: J. P. Raaj Selva
- Edited by: G. Krithiga
- Music by: Yegan
- Production company: A Dreamer World
- Release date: 14 October 2011
- Running time: 120 minutes
- Country: India
- Language: Tamil

Uyirin Yedai 21 Ayiri (transl. Life's weight is 21 grams), also known as Uyirin Yedai 21 Gram, is a 2011 Indian Tamil-language gangster film directed by Yegan. The film stars Yegan, Thilakan and newcomer Vinitha, with Murali, Pudhupettai Jeeva, Baby Sangamithra, Manian Pradeep, R. Deva and Ravidharman playing supporting roles. The film had musical score by Yegan and was released on 14 October 2011.

== Plot ==
Easwar (Yegan) is a heartless rowdy who works for the powerful don Acha (Thilakan). Seth (Gopal Sharma) wants to buy land, so he seeks the help of the rowdy Maattu Ravi (Ravidharman) who used to work for Acha. Acha orders Easwar to kill Maattu Ravi and to kidnap Seth. Easwar kills Maattu Ravi and Acha solves the issue. Maattu Ravi's brother Pandi swears to take revenge on Easwar.

One year later, Pandi challenges Easwar to fight him and to end their feud once and for all. Acha's right-hand man Attai (R. Deva) and Acha's henchman Bala (Pudhupettai Jeeva) decide to support Pandi. In a remote place, Easwar meets Pandi and he is ambushed by four other henchmen. During the fight, Easwar kills the four henchmen and when he tries to kill Pandi, Acha's son Chinna (Murali) heavily wounded him and left him for dead. Chinna was sick of being treated as a small kid by Easwar. Thereafter, people living in a forest save Easwar. Easwar slowly becomes a good man, he is liked by the villagers and falls in love with a widow (Vinitha). Acha tracks him down and orders him to come back. Easwar then convinces Acha to let him go and Acha accepts. Easwar asks Bala and Chinna to take him back to the forest. Chinna fears that Easwar may take revenge so he kills him and they burn his body.

== Cast ==
- Yegan as Easwar
- Thilakan as Acha
- Vinitha as Devi's mother
- Murali as Chinna
- Pudhupettai Jeeva as Bala
- Baby Sangamithra as Devi
- Manian Pradeep as Pandi
- R. Deva as Attai
- Ravidharman as Maattu Ravi
- Deivendran as Ochu
- Karthik as Oomaiyan
- Gopal Sharma as Seth
- Punch Bharani as Sotta
- A. T. Shanmugam as Teacher
- Sultan Bhai as Aattu Bhai
- Classic Dheena as Aadhi
- Rithu Mangal as Vino
- Subhashini in a special appearance

== Production ==
Yegan made his directorial debut with Uyirin Yedai 21 Ayiri under the banner of A Dreamer World. Yegan also wrote the script, composed the music and played the lead role. Malayalam film actor Thilakan was cast to play an important role while newcomer Vinitha was chosen to play the heroine. G. Krithiga took care of editing and the cinematography was by J. P. Raaj Selva. The film had 41 sensor cuts by the censor board for overdose of sex and violence.

== Soundtrack ==
Uyirin Yedai 21 Ayiri

Soundtrack album by Yegan
- Released: 2011
- Recorded: 2011
- Genre: Feature film soundtrack
- Length: 8:52
- Producer: Yegan

The soundtrack was composed by Yegan.

Tracklist
No.	Title	Writer(s)	Singer(s)	Length
1.	"Uyirin Yedai"	Yosi	Yegan	2:41
2.	"Oorazhuga"	Gopal Sharma	R. Deva	1:48
3.	"Adadaa"	Yegan	Gopan Kumar	4:23
Total length:				8:52

== Reception ==
Kungumam praised the acting of Yegan and Thilakan. Dinamalar gave the film a positive review.
