= Nakshatra (actress) =

Indian actress (born 2002)

- Born: Nakshatra; 1989 or 1990 (age 36–37)
- Other name: Deepthi
- Occupation: Actress
- Years active: 2009–2018
- Parent(s): D. Rajendra Babu; Sumithra
- Family: Uma Shankari (Sister)

Nakshatra is an Indian actress who appears primarily in Malayalam and Kannada language films.

== Early life ==
Nakshatra was born as the youngest daughter to Kannada film director D. Rajendra Babu and actress Sumithra. She has one elder sister, Umashankari, who is also an actress. She has studied biotech at the Erode Sengunthar Engineering College.

Nakshatra has said that she had always wanted to become an actress. Her parents were initially against her wish as she was their "pampered daughter" and did not want to see her go through any hardships.

== Career ==
At age 17, Nakshatra was spotted by director Sunil Kumar Desai at a function, who called her mother, Sumithra, and expressed interest in casting her in his film. She was given the starring role in Desai's Saregama and shortly after landed a role in Gokula, which also became her maiden release, and one of the lead roles in Hare Rama Hare Krishna. She played a shy girl in Gokula and got to act alongside her mother. Critics were positive on her performance in that film, stating that she was "quite impressive", "steals the show" and "strikes in a small role". Saregama went through several delays and was shelved later, while, due to conflicting schedules, she had to opt out of Hare Rama Hare Krishna, with the role going to Pooja Gandhi eventually. In 2011, she had her first Tamil releases, Doo and Marudhavelu. The next year, she also made her debut in Malayalam in Vaidooryam, changing her screen name to Deepthi for Malayalam films. She had a second Malayalam release that year, Kili Paadum Gramam. In Vaidooryam, she played Gayathri, a "strong woman who faces hardships and goes through emotional trauma to win her love", with Nakshatra stating that the role was a "huge challenge" as some scenes were "very demanding". She further added that working in the film helped her to overcome her "inner obstacles" as was a shy and reserved person but was forced to open up and "come out of my shell" for the role. In Kili Paadum Gramam she played a "pampered and bubbly village girl"; both films were box office bombs.

The Malayalam film For Sale, in which she had a minor role, was her first release in 2013. She had her other release that year in Tamil, Arya Surya, Rama Narayanan's 126th directorial. She was then signed for an "important role" in the Kannada film Fair & Lovely. A review from The Hindu, however, wrote that she had "nothing much to offer". In 2015, she first appeared in the Malayalam film Village Guys, in which she shared screen space with her mother again. Amongst her upcoming films is Kuchiku Kuchiku, in which she was directed by her father, who had completed the film before his death. In Oru New Generation Pani directed by debutant Sankar Narayan, she would be seen as Indraja, a bold and well educated girl, who is brought up by her mother.

== Filmography ==
Year	Title	Role	Language	Notes
2009	Gokula	Mahalakshmi	Kannada	
2011	Doo	Swapna	Tamil	
2011	Marudhavelu	Vidhya Venugopalan	Tamil	
2011	Hare Rama Hare Krishna		Kannada	
2012	Vaidooryam	Gayathri	Malayalam	
2012	Kili Paadum Gramam		Malayalam	
2013	For Sale	Bala	Malayalam	
2013	Arya Surya	Chandragaandha	Tamil	
2014	Monayi Angane Aanayi	Maya	Malayalam	
2014	Fair & Lovely		Kannada	
2015	Village Guys	Aarathy Vasudevan	Malayalam	
2015	Kuchiku Kuchiku		Kannada	
2015	Oru New Generation Pani	Induja	Malayalam	
2018	MMCH	Harshitha	Kannada	
2026	I, Nobody		Malayalam	
