= Seventh Channel Communications =

Indian film company

- Company type: Film production Film distribution
- Industry: Entertainment
- Founded: 1985
- Headquarters: Chennai, India
- Key people: Manickam Narayanan
- Products: Motion pictures (Tamil)

Seventh Channel Communications is an Indian film production and distribution company formed in 1985. It produced several Tamil language television serials films in the 1990s, and is headed by Manickam Narayanan.

== History ==
Seventh Channel Communications was set up in 1985 by Manickam Narayanan. After beginning his career as a photographer, Manickam went on to make programmes for Doordarshan. The studio went on to become a premier producer for Tamil television serials and films in the 1990s. During the peak of its operation, the studio was able to attract several film actors to work on television serials including Sivakumar, Roja and S. P. Balasubrahmanyam. The studio has also been involved in the restaurant business, the hosting of live entertainment shows, the International Tamil Film Awards, and the Tamil Nadu Film Festival.

In 2005, Seventh Channel Communications stepped in to take over the production of Gautham Vasudev Menon's Vettaiyaadu Vilaiyaadu (2006) starring Kamal Haasan, after the producers at Roja Combines and Oscar Films opted out.

The studio produced Magizh Thirumeni's Mundhinam Paartheney (2010) featuring newcomers Sanjay, Ekta Ghosla, Lizna, Pooja and Vithagan (2011) starring Parthiban and Poorna. In the early 2010s, Seventh Channel collaborated with Star Vijay to dub and release Mahabharat (2013) in the Tamil language.

== Filmography ==
Films as producer

Title	Year	Language	Director	Cast	Synopsis	Ref.
Pudhiya Thendral	1993	Tamil	Prabhakar	Ramesh Aravind, Sivaranjani, Radhika		
Coolie	1995	Tamil	P. Vasu	Sarathkumar, Meena, Kavitha Vijayakumar		
Maanbumigu Maanavan	1996	Tamil	S. A. Chandrasekhar	Vijay, Swapna Bedi, Mansoor Ali Khan		
Seenu	2000	Tamil	P. Vasu	Karthik, Malavika, P. Vasu		
Vettaiyaadu Vilaiyaadu	2006	Tamil	Gautham Vasudev Menon	Kamal Haasan, Jyothika, Kamalinee Mukherjee		
Indiralohathil Na Azhagappan	2008	Tamil	Thambi Ramaiah	Vadivelu, Yamini Sharma, Suja Varunee		
Mundhinam Paartheney	2010	Tamil	Magizh Thirumeni	Sanjay, Ekta Ghosla, Lizna, Pooja		
Vithagan	2011	Tamil	R. Parthiban	Parthiban, Poorna, Milind Soman		

Television series as producer

- Ethanai Manidhargal
- Srirangathu Devathaigal
- Kanavugall Illavasam
- Alai Osai
- Vaazhkai
- Marakkamudiyavillai
- Pennmanam
- Marupadiyum Aval
- Uravugal Oru Thodarkadhai
- Marupakkam
- Madhumita
- Pandian Parisu
- Nadhi Enge Pogiradhu
