= Ekta Khosla =

Indian model and actress

- Occupations: Model; actress
- Years active: 2005–present

Ekta Khosla is an Indian actress and former model who worked in Kannada, Telugu, and Tamil-language films.

== Career ==
She worked as a model in Mumbai. In 2004, at the Pond's Femina Miss India contest, she won the Sony My Miss India title. She made her Kannada debut with Thunta (2005) co-starring Balaji playing the role of a college student. A critic wrote that she "does not impress but looks good in the song sequences". In 2006, she won the title of Miss Beautiful Hair at the Feminia Miss India pageant. In 2007, she made her Telugu debut with Poramboku. She played a minor role in her second Kannada film Gaja (2008). She made her Tamil debut with Mundhinam Paartheney (2010) in which she played a salsa trainer. A critic wrote that "Out of the three ladies, Ektha has more footage and delivers well".

She took a hiatus from films and continued to work in ads while also working as a YouTuber.

== Filmography ==
Year	Film	Role	Language	Notes
2005	Thunta	Priya	Kannada	
2007	Poramboku	Chaitra	Telugu	
2008	Gaja	Satya	Kannada	
2010	Mundhinam Paartheney	Aarthi	Tamil	
