= Veluthu Kattu =

2010 film by Senapathi Magan

- Poster
- Directed by: Senapathi Magan
- Written by: Senapathi Magan
- Produced by: S. A. Chandrasekhar
- Starring: Kathir; Arundhati
- Cinematography: M. Sukumar
- Edited by: Sudha
- Music by: Bharani
- Production company: Star Makers
- Release date: 2 July 2010
- Running time: 135 minutes
- Country: India
- Language: Tamil

Veluthu Kattu (transl. Rock On) is a 2010 Indian Tamil-language romantic drama film directed by Senapathi Magan. The film stars newcomers Kathir and Arundhati, with Archna Sharma, Pavina, L. Raja, Karate Raja, Muthuraj and Vishwanth playing supporting roles. The film, produced by S. A. Chandrasekhar, had music by Bharani and was released on 2 July 2010.

== Plot ==
Kathiresan (Kathir) is a wastrel and a brute in the village Singampatti, he dropped out of school at an early age whereas Arukkani (Arundhati) is the village belle and a hard-working student. They are cousins and madly in love with each other since their childhood. As per the village's custom, they have the right to marry. Arukkani's father Marudachalam (L. Raja) hates Kathir to the core and wants his daughter to marry an educated groom. One day, the short-tempered Kathir cuts off the hand of Arukkani's cousin Karuppusamy (Vishwanth), for misbehaving with his lover Arukkani. Kathir was then sent to jail for this crime. When he emerged from prison, Kathir continues to date with Arukkani. Marudachalam, therefore, arranges the marriage of his daughter with another man but Kathir cancels the marriage. Marudachalam was very frustrated with what was going on, so he lets his daughter go with her lover. To everyone's surprise, Arukkani refuses to marry him now. She asks him to get a job and to be financially stable then she will marry him.

Kathir leaves his village for the city to look for a job. In Chennai, Kathir finds the life difficult and could not find a job. He then decides to wash the cars' windshields at the traffic lights and earns some money to eat. He then meets the petty thief Arumugam (Muthuraj) and befriends him, they later find a job in a college canteen. Thereafter, he befriends with the college students Janani (Archana Sharma) and Ramya (Pavina), the two sisters are the daughters of a rich businessman. The years went by and Kathir went through highs and lows, but he never gives up. Janani helps him to get a loan to open a restaurant. Kathir eventually becomes a successful restaurant owner.

After many years of hard work, Kathir finally returns to his village. In a twist of fate, Arukkani was forced to kill the village bigwig Rasu Minor (Karate Raja) who attempted to rape her. Arukkani is then arrested for the murderer and is taken to jail to serve her sentence. The film ends with Kathir and Arukkani getting married upon her return from the prison.

== Cast ==
- Kathir as Kathiresan alias Kathir
- Arundhati as Arukkani
- Archna Sharma as Janani
- Pavina as Ramya
- L. Raja as Marudachalam
- Karate Raja as Rasu Minor
- Muthuraj as Arumugam
- Vishwanth as Karuppusamy
- Anthakudi Ilayaraja as Rangu, Kathir's friend
- Pattiveera Gajapathi as Kathir's friend
- Dhilsa as Kathir's friend
- Melur Sasi as Gopal
- Jennifer as Saroja
- Alagesh
- Master Vasanth as Young Kathir
- Baby Anu as Young Arukkani

== Production ==
After the disappointing reception of his previous film Pandhayam (2008), S. A. Chandrasekhar decided to produce a film under the direction of his former assistant Senapathi Magan. The film was inspired by incidents that took place in the producer S. A. Chandrasekhar's own life. Newcomers Kathir and Arundhati were selected to play the lead roles along with Archna Sharma and Pavina, the latter of which was also a first-timer. A three-month rehearsal was also held for them before shooting began. While shooting in the villages near Dindigul and other places, the unit needed several temples for the shoot. In the area of Ambasamudram, instead of using a set, S. A. Chandrasekhar decided to make a real Vinayagar temple ten feet away from the Thamirabarani River and then leave it for the villagers to use. Nearly 3 lakhs of rupees were spent on the temple which had a temple ritual and a feast for the entire village of nearly 2000 people during the 20-day shoot. While shooting in Aiyapetti, a giant 30 feet Aiyanar was built with cement and mortar and after the shoot, it was left installed in the village for the locals to worship. They also built the compound wall of an Amman temple near Sedipetti.

== Soundtrack ==
The film score and the soundtrack were composed by Bharani. The soundtrack, released on 24 June 2010, features 8 tracks. The audio was released in many cities across Tamil Nadu. At Sathyam Cinemas, in Chennai, S. A. Chandrasekhar's son Vijay launched the audio on 5 May 2010 and actress Khushbu received the first copy of the CD. R. Parthiepan, R. B. Choudary, Rama Narayanan, Kalaipuli G. Sekaran and S. Thanu attended the audio function.

Track-List
| No. | Title | Lyrics | Singer(s) | Length |
|---|---|---|---|---|
| 1. | "Kirratha" | Snehan | Tippu | 4:05 |
| 2. | "Thalaseevi" | Na. Muthukumar | Roshini | 5:20 |
| 3. | "Singampatti" | Kabilan | Shankar Mahadevan, Charulatha Mani, Pallavi Surendar | 4:56 |
| 4. | "Oththaiyaa Irundha" | Na. Muthukumar | Anthakudi Ilayaraja, Roshini | 4:22 |
| 5. | "Sangili Pungili" | Na. Muthukumar | Rap Valla, Shoba Chandrasekhar, Karthil | 4:12 |
| 6. | "Kaakkaikku" | Bharani | Shakthi Pragadesh, Vaishali, Muthupandi | 2:31 |
| 7. | "Oththaiyaa Irundha" (Female) | Na. Muthukumar | Roshini | 2:49 |
| 8. | "Anbulla" | Snehan | Bharani | 1:49 |
| Total length: | | | | 30:04 |

== Release ==
The film opened across nearly 105 screens in Tamil Nadu, which was considered "huge for a film with newcomers". Initially the film had its release date fixed on 25 June 2010, but it was released the following week on 2 July 2010.

The magazine Ananda Vikatan gave the film a rating of 38 out of 100. Malathi Rangarajan of The Hindu said, "Performance wise, new hero Kadhir has quite a long way to traverse while debutant Arundhati, who looks charming and just right for the role, tends to overact". Sify rated the film "Below Average" and said, "The only silver lining in otherwise a drab film is the performance of the lead cast especially the new girl Arundhathi. There is nothing much to write about as far as the technical side, music or packaging is concerned". A reviewer from Dinamalar praised the lead pair and the rest of the cast's acting, and he criticized for its similarity to the film Pasanga (2009).
