= Archna Sharma =

Indian actress

- Born: Archna Sharma; Bangalore, Karnataka, India
- Education: University of Mysore; Anna University
- Occupation: Actress
- Years active: 2009–present

Archna Sharma, is an Indian actor and model, who has appeared in Tamil, Hindi and Telugu films and television.

== Early life and education ==
She is originally from Bihar, was born in Bengaluru, Karnataka, and currently resides in Mumbai, pursuing her acting career.

She completed her graduation in Computer Science and Engineering from Anna University and her post-graduation in Business Administration from University of Mysore.

== Career ==
After receiving a diploma in acting from the Anupam Kher Institute of acting, Mumbai, she shifted to Chennai and lived there for eight years. She has appeared in over fifty TV commercials across South India including a jewellery advertisement alongside Varalaxmi Sarathkumar. She studied for her MBA in Chennai and learned Bharatanatyam.

She acted in director S. A. Chandrasekhar's film Veluthu Kattu.

She has also appeared in both seasons of the Sony LIV web series Kathmandu Connection.

== Filmography ==
List of Archna Sharma credits
Year	Title	Role	Language	Notes
2009	Thozhi	Saranya	Tamil	credited as Dwaraka
2010	Puzhal	Rita	Tamil	
2010	Veluthu Kattu	Janani	Tamil	
2011	Othigai		Tamil	
2012	Friends Book	Nithya	Telugu	
2019	The Accidental Prime Minister	Chiki Sarkar	Hindi	
2021	Kathmandu Connection	Sushmita Kaushik	Hindi	SonyLIV series
