= Pollachi Mappillai =

- Theatrical release poster
- Directed by: R. Lakshmanan
- Produced by: Mangai Harirajan
- Starring: Sathyaraj; Goundamani
- Cinematography: S. Ashokrajan
- Edited by: M. Sunilkumar
- Music by: Deva
- Production company: Priyanka Art Productions
- Release date: 16 July 2010
- Running time: 125 minutes
- Country: India
- Language: Tamil

Pollachi Mappillai (transl. Pollachi son-in-law) is a 2010 Indian Tamil language comedy film directed by R. Lakshmanan. The film features Sathyaraj and Goundamani in lead roles with Susan in a pivotal role. The film, produced by Mangai Harirajan, had musical score by Deva and was released after several delays on 16 July 2010 to positive reviews, but it was a flop at the box office.

== Cast ==
- Sathyaraj as Sengaaliyappan
- Goundamani as Chellammuthu
- Susan as Deivanai
- Manivannan as Killer Manju
- Vinu Chakravarthy as Muthu Gounder
- T. P. Gajendran as Astrologer
- Anu Mohan as Inspector Sathish
- Alex as Virudhagiri
- Halwa Vasu as Killer Manju's assistant
- Balu Anand as Salli Veera
- Abhinayashree as Dancer (item number in "Dhuddu Dhuddu")
- Gumtaj as Dancer (item number in "Vecha Idam")

== Production ==
Television serial director Mangai Harirajan chose to make a film with Sathyaraj in a venture titled Kootani Aatchi in early 2005. The project meant that Sathyaraj and Harirajan agreed to shelve another film they were making together titled Perumal Samy, a film based on a Kolkata-based hangman with Sibiraj also in the cast. Lakshmanan, an associate to Sundar C, was selected to make his debut as director; while Susan who had appeared in Neranja Manasu (2004) was roped in to play heroine. In April 2005, the team chose to change the film's title to Kovai Express, supposedly inspired by Kamal Haasan's film from the same period, Mumbai Xpress. The title was soon after changed to Pollachi Mappillai.

Production delays of the film, led to slow progress and long breaks between schedules. An item number featuring Gumtaj was added and the team began preparing for a Summer 2008 release, though further financial constraints meant more delays.

== Soundtrack ==
Soundtrack was composed by Deva. The soundtrack of the film was released in March 2008 at Hotel Green Park in a ceremony which involved several film producers.

- "Indha Guindy" - Senthil, Jayalakshmi
- "Mappillai Mappillai" - Madurai Panneerselvam
- "Dhuddu Dhuddu" - Sofiya
- "Vecha Idam" - Mano, Sofiya

== Release ==
The film eventually had a low key release in July 2010, with little spending by the team on publicity. It had an average box office opening, though quickly slipped out of theatres. The New Indian Express labelled the film as "very forgettable".
