= Mundhinam Paartheney =

- Poster
- Directed by: Magizh Thirumeni
- Written by: Magizh Thirumeni
- Produced by: Manickam Narayanan
- Starring: Sanjay; Ekta Khosla; Lizna; Pooja B.; Sai Prashanth
- Cinematography: Arul Vincent
- Edited by: Anthony
- Music by: Thaman S
- Production company: Seventh Channel Communications
- Release date: 19 March 2010
- Country: India
- Language: Tamil

Mundhinam Paartheney (transl. Saw you the day before) is a 2010 Indian Tamil-language romantic comedy film written and directed by debutant director Magizh Thirumeni, starring Sanjay, Ekta Khosla, Lizna, Pooja B. and Sai Prashanth in the lead roles. The film, produced by Manickam Narayanan's Seventh Channel Communications, was released on 19 March 2010.

== Plot ==
The story unfolds in London, where Sanjay, narrates about his 'kind' of girl, and talks about love. Cut to flashback, the hero meets Pooja. He repeatedly tries to impress her. But he learns that she plans to marry a NRI youth. Then comes Aarthi, a dance tutor. She is a girl with traditional ideas but a modern outlook. Unfortunately, the hero's attempts to settle down with her gets jinxed. Then enters Anu, Sanjay's colleague. How he tries to woo her forms the rest of the story.

== Cast ==
- Sanjay as Sanjay
- Ekta Khosla as Aarthi
- Lizna as Anu
- Pooja B. as Pooja
- Sai Prashanth as Dinesh
- Deepak Dinkar as Rajiv
- Lakshmi Priyaa Chandramouli as Prashanthi
- Priyadharshini as Priya
- Subbu Panchu in a guest appearance

== Production ==
Mundhinam Paartheney was the directorial debut of Magizh Thirumeni. The film's title is inspired by a song from Vaaranam Aayiram (2008). Sanjay Vellanki made his Tamil film debut in the role of a software professional. Ekta Khosla also made her Tamil debut with the film and plays a salsa dance instructor. Newcomer Lakshmi Priyaa Chandramouli played a supporting role in the film and shot for the film for ten days. A song choreographed by Ramash was shot on Khosla with Thota Tharani handling the art direction. The song "Maya" was shot at White Cliffs of Dover and Dover Castle.

== Soundtrack ==
The music was composed by Thaman S and was released on Sony Music India. Karthik Srinivasan from Milliblog wrote that "After last year's Eeram, Thaman displays tremendous confidence and delivers a sweet whopper!"

Track listing
No.	Title	Lyrics	Singer(s)	Length
1.	"Indre Indre"	Priyan	Ranjith	4:05
2.	"Pesum Poove"	Viveka	Krish, Suchitra	4:07
3.	"Manadhin Adiyil"	Priyan	Priyadarshini	4:18
4.	"Maya"	Rohini	Naresh Iyer, Janani Bharadwaj	5:10
5.	"Kanavena"	Rohini	Haricharan, Suchitra	3:06
6.	"Mun Dhinam Paarthen"	Priyan	S. Thaman, Suchitra	3:18
Total length:				24:04

== Release ==
Mundhinam Paartheney was released on 19 March 2010, alongside Kacheri Arambam and Oru Kathalan Oru Kathali. It secured the "best of screens and prime shows in multiplexes" among the releases and was projected to have a good opening due to its promotions and the popularity of its music. However, the film did not perform well at the box office.

== Reception ==
Pavithra Srinivasan of Rediff.com wrote "It might not be a slam-bang action movie with twists at every turn but Mundhinam Parthene is fairly accurate, humorous portrayal of life in a certain section of the society, deftly told. Definitely worth a watch". Gautaman Bhaskaran from Hindustan Times wrote "Mundhinam Paartheney is sadly, a good theme that has not been crafted with care. Indeed, a classic case of an interesting plot spoilt by an awful narrative style". A critic from Sify wrote that Magizh Thirumeni "has come out with flying colors as an independent director with Mundhinam Paartheney. It has a captivating freshness about it though there is nothing new in the story". Malathi Rangarajan from The Hindu wrote that "The screenplay presents much scope for director Magilzh Thirumeni to infuse scenes with a surfeit of sexual overtones. Yet he exercises restraint and comes out with a natural, underplayed fare". R. S. Prakash from Bangalore Mirror wrote that "It's a film that's an easy watch across an audience categories devoid of unnecessary elements in the name of commercial musts".
