= Sanjay Vellanki =

Indian actor

- Born: India
- Other name: Sanjay
- Occupation: Actor
- Years active: 2005–2023

Sanjay Vellanki is a former Indian actor who worked in Telugu and Tamil films. He is known for his work in Parugu (2008), Mundhinam Paartheney (2010) and Doo (2011).

== Personal life ==
Prior to entering films, he worked as a chef in a five-star hotel in Mumbai. His brother worked as an assistant director to Mohan Raja.

== Career ==
Sanjay Vellanki went to acting school before making his debut as a lead actor with Kadante Avunanile (2005) under the stage name of Vamsi Krishna. He went on to play supporting roles in several Telugu films including Parugu (2008), where he played Poonam Bajwa's lover, with whom she elopes.

He made his Tamil debut with the romantic drama Mundhinam Paartheney (2010). To prepare for his role of a software professional, he lost ten kilograms. His performance was well received with a critic noting that "New face Sanjay delivers a low-key yet elegant performance as Sanju, giving his co-star all the room to shine". He then starred in another romantic film Doo (2011). Regarding his performance, a critic wrote that "Sanjay lends conviction to his role, and is comfortable in the fight-dance sequence also". Although Mundhinam Partheney and Doo released to above average reviews, both films were box office failures. His next film Eppodhum Vendraan (2014) had a low-key release and the film Theriyum Aanal Theriyathu was never released.

He played the second hero in the film Kabadi Bro, which released after a four year delay in 2023.

== Filmography ==
=== Feature films ===
Year	Title	Role	Language	Notes
2005	Kadante Avunanile	Raghuram	Telugu	
2006	Lakshmi	Dr. Lokesh	Telugu	
2006	Photo	Giri	Telugu	
2007	Munna	Munna's friend	Telugu	
2008	Parugu	Errababu	Telugu	
2010	Mundhinam Paartheney	Sanjay	Tamil	
2011	Doo	Vasanth	Tamil	
2014	Eppothum Vendraan	Saravanan	Tamil	
2018	Ratsasan	Inspector Durai Raj	Tamil	
2023	Kabadi Bro	Shakti	Tamil	

=== Other work ===
Year	Title	Role	Language	Notes
2014	Happy Married Life	—N/a	Tamil	Short films
2016	Rusi Kanda Poonai	Meera's husband	Tamil	Short films
2021	Bhoomi	Bharat	Telugu	Short films
2022	Yedhedho Maatram	—N/a	Tamil	Music video
