= Vithagan =

- Theatrical release poster
- Directed by: R. Parthiban
- Written by: R. Parthiban
- Produced by: Manickam Narayanan
- Starring: R. Parthiban; Poorna
- Cinematography: M. S. Prabhu
- Edited by: Anthony
- Music by: Joshua Sridhar
- Production company: Seventh Channel Communications
- Release date: 18 November 2011
- Country: India
- Language: Tamil

Vithagan (transl. Trickster/Master) is a 2011 Tamil-language action comedy film directed by R. Parthiban, starring himself along with Poorna. The film, which has been in making since 2008, released on 18 November 2011. The film was the 50th film of Parthiban, has him in the role of a police officer, who is brainy as well as brawny.

== Plot ==
Rowdran (R. Parthiban) is an upright cop who is fighting not only the scums of the society but also his seniors who are hand-in-glove with the goondas. For this, he takes law into his hands and goes on an unstoppable killing spree wiping out the wanted criminals in police files, one by one in carefully planned operations.

But soon, the film goes from a legitimate thriller to a typical revenge drama without much warning. In a flashback, we are told that our orphan cop had a picture-perfect family which was wiped out by Badri (Milind Soman). And now to bring the don back from a foreign destination and take revenge, Rowdran who is put behind bars turns a goonda and joins Sena (another don) and takes on Badri.

== Cast ==
- R. Parthiban as ACP Rowdhran
- Poorna as Mercy
- Milind Soman as Badri
- Ravishankar as Sena
- Vincent Asokan as Vishwa
- L. Raja as DC Gopal
- Lakshmi Ramakrishnan
- Mohan Natarajan
- M. J. Shriram
- Singamuthu
- Mahanadhi Shankar
- Sampath Ram
- Krishnamoorthy
- Raaki Parthiban (Special appearance)

== Production ==
Two years after his last venture Pachchak Kuthira failed at the box office, Parthiban commenced his next directorial titled as Vithagan in 2008, while also playing the lead role in the film - that of an intelligent assistant commissioner who is "crooked and cunning at the same time". Poorna was selected to portray the female lead as a Christian girl named Mercy. Parthiban's son Radhakrishnan (Raaki) would appear in a one-minute cameo role during a song sequence. Vadivelu was supposedly considered for a comedy role in the film, which did not materialize eventually. While Joshua Sridhar was roped in to compose the film's score, M. S. Prabhu was signed as the cinematographer and Nalini Sriram as the costume designer.

== Soundtrack ==
Soundtrack was composed by Joshua Sridhar and lyrics for all songs written by Parthiban.

- Gappu Aappu - Benny Dayal
- Ikkuthe - Hariharan, Shreya Ghoshal
- Thanana - Swetha Mohan
- Un Zone La - Sayanora Philips, Suchitra
- Kadalirandu - Chinmayi
- Vegamaai - Benny Dayal, Sunitha Sarathy

== Critical reception ==
Pavithra Srinivasan of Rediff.com rated it 1.5/5, stating "M S Prabhu's camera-work and Antony's editing are wasted. But the credit for a truly horrendous screenplay must, undoubtedly, go to Parthiban himself." Sify wrote, "If the film manages to keep you hooked, it is those witty one-liners and clever dialogues by Parthepan, crisp editing by Antony and truly interesting twists. Joshua Sridhar's music is another saving grace [...] this police story is painfully predictable, and offers nothing original especially the blood soaked climax".
