= G. Dhinakar Raj =

Indian veterinary scientist

- Born: 22 September 1963 (age 63); Tamil Nadu, India
- Education: Madras Veterinary College; Tamilnadu Agricultural University; Indian Veterinary Research Institute; University of Liverpool; University of Nebraska–Lincoln; Pirbright Institute
- Known for: Studies on diagnostics of veterinary diseases
- Awards: 2006 ISVIB Dr. F. M. Burnett Award; 2007 N-BIOS Prize
- Scientific career
- Fields: Veterinary medicine
- Workplaces: Tamil Nadu Veterinary and Animal Sciences University; Veterinary Incubation Foundation - TANUVAS

Gopal Dhinakar Raj is an Indian veterinary scientist, an academic and the project director of the Translational Research Platform for Veterinary Biologicals, a partnership program between the Department of Biotechnology and the Tamil Nadu Veterinary and Animal Sciences University. Known for the development of diagnostic test kits for animal and poultry diseases such as Leptospirosis and Egg drop syndrome, Raj is a member of the DBT Task Force on Animal Biotechnology. The Department of Biotechnology of the Government of India awarded him the National Bioscience Award for Career Development, one of the highest Indian science awards, for his contributions to biosciences in 2007.

== Biography ==
Born in the south Indian state of Tamil Nadu, Dhinakar Raj did his undergraduate studies at Madras Veterinary College and obtained the degree of BVSc from the Tamilnadu Agricultural University in 1986, standing first in the university which earned him four gold medals. (Note: Please click on the link, Project Director to see the details) Subsequently, he completed his master's studies in biotechnology at the Indian Veterinary Research Institute in 1989 and moved to the UK for his doctoral studies on a Commonwealth Fellowship program to secure a PhD in 1997. His post-doctoral work was, at first, at the University of Nebraska–Lincoln in 2001 and later at Pirbright Institute (then known as the Institute for Animal Health) in 2008. In between he joined the Tamil Nadu Veterinary and Animal Sciences University (TANUVAS) as an associate professor where he is a professor and serves as the project director of the Translational Research Platform for Veterinary Biologicals, a collaborative initiative between the Department of Biotechnology and TANUVAS. He currently serves as Director, Centre for Animal Heath Studies (CAHS) and Director, Veterinary Incubation Foundation @ TANUVAS, a Section 8 company established by Tamil Nadu Veterinary and Animal Sciences University, Chennai.

== Legacy ==
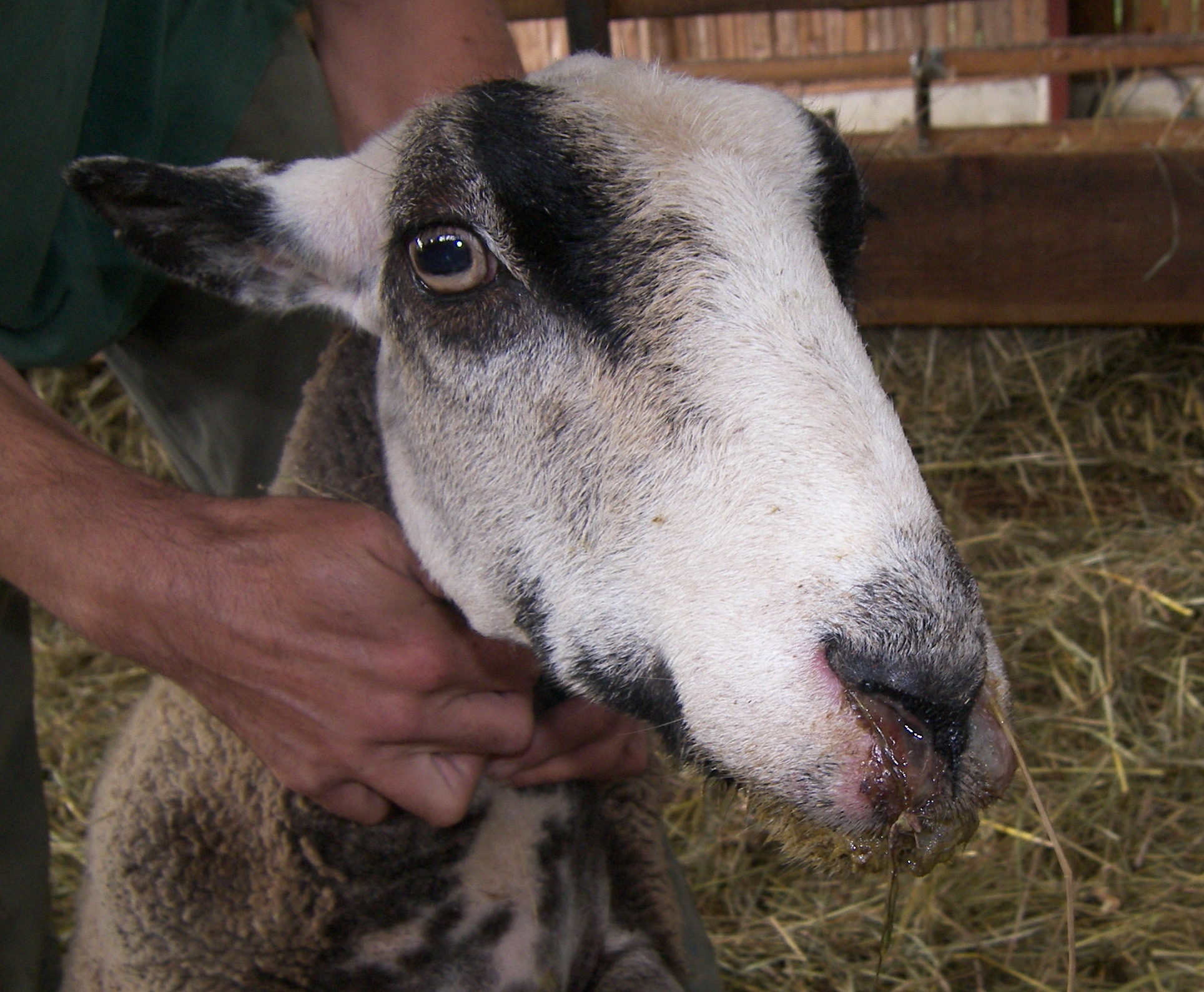
Bluetongue disease - an infected sheep

Raj, who specializes in animal biotechnology, focuses his work in the fields of molecular diagnostics and immunology and has carried out research on the development of diagnostic kits for various animal and poultry diseases. The team led by him at TANUVAS is reported to have developed a methodology for detecting Bluetongue disease which uses latex beads smeared with specially developed monoclonal antibodies by the team. In 2015, he led the team that developed a diagnostic kit for Leptospirosis (rat fever), a common disease spread by infected rats. The kit, jointly developed by scientists from TANUVAS and the department of microbiology of the Government General Hospital, Chennai, was cheaper by one-fifth of the price of similar kits available in the market at that time. His contributions are also reported in the development and validation of a Peste des petits ruminants (PPR) Vaccine, sexing kits for emus, biomarkers for chicken and nanoparticle-coupled vaccine for Newcastle disease. Molecular biological studies of the viruses that cause egg drop syndrome, bronchitis, rabies and chikungunya as well as immunological studies of the genetic resistance of Indian goats and buffaloes are some of his other contributions. His studies have been documented by way of a number of articles (Note: Please see Selected bibliography section) and ResearchGate, an online repository of scientific articles has listed 113 of them. Besides, he is the author of two books, Animal Biotechnology: Vaccines and Diagnostics-Markets and Investment Opportunities and Monoclonal Antibodies Application in Disease and Health. He holds an Indian patent and eight of his patent applications are pending approval. He is a former member of the editorial board of Avian Pathology journal of Taylor & Francis and a member of the Task Force on Animal Biotechnology of the Department of Biotechnology. He is also associated with the Indian Society For Veterinary Immunology And Biotechnology (ISVIB) and serves as its vice president.

== Awards and honors ==
Raj received the Dr. F. M. Burnett Award of the Indian Society For Veterinary Immunology And Biotechnology in 2006. The Department of Biotechnology (DBT) of the Government of India awarded him the National Bioscience Award for Career Development, one of the highest Indian science awards in 2007. He received the Tata Innovation Fellowship of the DBT in 2012.

== Selected bibliography ==
=== Books ===
- G. Dhinakar Raj, S. Thilagar, S.R. Rao (2017). Animal Biotechnology: Vaccines and Diagnostics-Markets and Investment Opportunities. Daya Publishing House. p. 238. ISBN 978-9351248309.
- G. Dhinakar Raj (2012). Monoclonal Antibodies Application in Disease and Health. Studium Press. p. 372. ISBN 9789380012278.

=== Articles ===
- Kavitha, K. T.; Latha, B. R.; Raj, G. Dhinakar (1 March 2015). "Assessment of cell mediated immune response in rabbits immunized with affinity purified 35 kDa midgut antigen of Rhipicephalus haemaphysaloides ticks". Journal of Parasitic Diseases. 39 (1): 90–93. doi:10.1007/s12639-013-0291-8. ISSN 0971-7196. PMC 4328015. PMID 25698868.
- Vignesh, A.R.; Raj, G. Dhinakar; Dhanasekaran, S.; Tirumurugaan, K.G.; Raja, A. (2012). "Comparative in vitro toll-like receptor ligand induced cytokine profiles of Toda and Murrah buffaloes—Identification of tumour necrosis factor alpha promoter polymorphism". Veterinary Immunology and Immunopathology. 150 (3–4): 189–197. doi:10.1016/j.vetimm.2012.09.037. PMID 23084344.
- Jeyathilakan, N.; Basith, S. Abdul; John, Lalitha; Chandran, N. Daniel Joy; Raj, G. Dhinakar; Churchill, R. Richard (2014). "Evaluation of native 8kDa antigen based three immunoassays for diagnosis of cystic echinococcosis in sheep". Small Ruminant Research. 116 (2–3): 199–205. doi:10.1016/j.smallrumres.2013.10.012.

== See also ==
- Monoclonal antibody therapy
- Rhipicephalus haemaphysaloides
