= Unakkaga En Kadhal =

- Directed by: Jaykumar
- Written by: Jaykumar
- Produced by: Jaykumar
- Starring: Vishnupriyan; Shraddha; Shravan
- Cinematography: Utpal V. N.
- Edited by: K. Rajagopal
- Music by: Sanjeev–Darshan (Songs); S. P. Venkatesh (Score)
- Production company: Jaykumar Films
- Release date: 27 August 2010
- Running time: 130 minutes
- Country: India
- Language: Tamil

Unakkaga En Kadhal (transl. My love is for you) is a 2010 Tamil language romantic drama film produced, written and directed by Jaykumar. The film stars Vishnupriyan, newcomer Shraddha and newcomer Shravan, with an ensemble cast of Kadhal Vijay, Delhi Ganesh, Rajyalakshmi, Anjali Devi, Soori, Ruksha, S. Bhuvaneswari, Munnar Ramesh, Vaiyapuri and R. Sundarrajan playing supporting roles. It was released on 27 August 2010.

== Plot ==
In a village, Seetha (Shraddha) hails from a middle-class Brahmin family. She lives with her parents Seenu (Delhi Ganesh) and Mangalam (Rajyalakshmi), aunt (Anjali Devi), and cousin Ramu (Vishnupriyan). Ramu is a jobless and naive young man who is madly in love with Seetha since childhood. Seenu promised Ramu that he will marry Seetha. Seetha then gets admission in a college in Chennai. In the meantime, Seetha's family is in deep debt and is under pressure from the local shark Aadhi (Munnar Ramesh) to clear their debts.

In Chennai, Seetha befriends the modern girl Suzan (Ruksha), while her classmate Chakravarthy (Shravan) falls in love with her. One day, Chakravarthy makes fun of Ramu, and an angry Seetha slaps him in return. She tells Chakravarthy that she loves Ramu more than anything and will marry him. Later, a vengeful Chakravarthy abducts the lovers, and with his henchmen, beats Ramu up. A heavily wounded Ramu is rushed to the hospital and the doctors, ask for a huge amount of money to save his life. Seetha first files a complaint against Chakravarthy. A desperate Seetha then goes to Suzan's house to seek help, but Suzan's mother (S. Bhuvaneswari) drugs Seetha, and she is raped in her sleep. Thereafter, Ramu is saved, but Suzan's mother forces Seetha to come home. Chakravarthy reveals that he is the one who raped her and it was his master plan to take revenge on her. With his influence, Chakravarthy makes the innocent Seetha get arrested for prostitution. The news of Seetha being arrested for prostitution spreads like fire; thus, it tarnished the reputation of her family, and her family committed suicide. When the police come to know that Seetha is innocent, they release her without delay.

When Ramu and Seetha try to leave the village to live together, Chakravarthy stops their car and attempts to kill them. During the fight, Ramu is killed by Chakravarthy, and Seetha kills Chakravarthy in turn. The film ends with Seetha committing suicide by jumping off a waterfall with Ramu's body.

== Cast ==
- Vishnupriyan as Ramu
- Shraddha as Seetha
- Shravan as Chakravarthy
- Kadhal Vijay as Saravanan
- Delhi Ganesh as Seenu, Seetha's father
- Rajyalakshmi as Mangalam, Seetha's mother
- Anjali Devi as Ramu's mother
- Soori as "Blade" Balu
- Ruksha as Suzan
- S. Bhuvaneswari as Suzan's mother
- Munnar Ramesh as Aadhi
- Vaiyapuri as Tata Birla
- R. Sundarrajan
- Srikala Paramasivam as Raji, Seetha's sister
- Rajendranath as SP Ali Khan
- K. S. Jayalakshmi as Meenakshi
- Ramya as Mallika
- Muthukaalai

== Production ==
Jaykumar made his directorial debut with Unakkaga En Kadhal, a college-based triangular love story based on an incident in the director's life. Vishnupriyan, who acted in films like Ilakkanam (2006) and Ninaithale Inikkum (2009), was chosen to play the hero while, newcomer Shravan was selected to play an important role. Newcomer Shraddha, a Keralite brought up in Mumbai, signed to play the heroine role. Actress Simran was Shraddha's neighbour in Mumbai, and it was her that advised Shraddha to try out in the Tamil film industry. Utpal V. N. took care of camera works while Sanjeev–Darshan scored the music and the editing was handled by K. Rajagopal.

== Soundtrack ==
Unakkaga En Kadhal

Soundtrack album by Sanjeev–Darshan
- Released: 2010
- Recorded: 2010
- Genre: Feature film soundtrack
- Length: 25:02
- Label: Janani Musicals
- Producer: Sanjeev–Darshan

The film soundtrack was composed by Sanjeev–Darshan. The soundtrack, released in 2010, features five tracks with lyrics written by Piraisoodan.

Track	Song	Singer(s)	Duration
1	"Unakkaka En Kadhal" (duet)	Tippu, Sadhana Sargam	5:07
2	"Unakkaka En Kadhal" (solo)	K. S. Chithra	4:57
3	"Yen En Manathai" (male)	Karthik	5:34
4	"Yen En Manathai" (female)	Mahalakshmi Iyer	5:35
5	"Nenachathe Seyyanam"	Jayadev, Mahalakshmi Iyer	3:49
