= K. Ramasamy =

K. Ramasamy may refer to:

- K. Ramasamy (politician), Indian politician
- K. Ramasamy (scientist) (born 1948), vice chancellor of Tamil Nadu Agricultural University
