= V. K. Pandian =

5T Secretary Government Of Odisha

- Born: 29 May 1974 (age 52); Tamil Nadu, India
- Education: Tamil Nadu Agricultural University (MSc) Indian Agricultural Research Institute
- Spouse: Sujata Rout

V. Karthikeya Pandian (born 29 May 1974) is a retired Indian Administrative Service (IAS) officer of the 2000 batch from the Odisha cadre, known for his close association with Odisha Chief Minister Naveen Patnaik. Pandian has served in various key administrative roles in the state and played a significant part in shaping Odisha's governance and public service delivery mechanisms.

He held the post of Chairman 5T (Transformational Initiatives) with the rank of a Cabinet Minister during Fifth Naveen Patnaik ministry. Prior to this, Pandian served as the Private Secretary to the Chief Minister Naveen Patnaik for 12 years and Secretary to the Chief Minister's Transformational Initiatives of the Odisha Government.

== Personal life ==
Pandian was born on 29 May 1974, in Koothappanpatti, Madurai district, Tamil Nadu and did his schooling in Vellalapatti and Neyveli. Pandian completed his bachelor's degree in agriculture from the Agricultural College Research Institute, Madurai and later obtained a master's degree from the Indian Agricultural Research Institute, Pusa, New Delhi. In 1999, he got selected to Indian Revenue Service and then on 2000, he got selected as Indian Administrative Service officer in the Punjab Cadre through Civil Services Examination. Thereafter on spouse grounds he got transferred to Orissa Cadre.

He is married to Sujata Rout Karthikeyan, a fellow IAS officer of 2000 batch who is an Odia. She was the head of Mission Shakti, flagship SHG group project of Odisha with 7 million members.

== Career ==
=== Bureaucratic career ===
Pandian began his career as an IAS officer in 2000, at post-cyclone Odisha. In 2002, he was appointed Sub Collector of Dharamgarh in Kalahandi district where he was successful in implementation of the Minimum support price (MSP) for farmers.

In 2004, as Additional District Magistrate in Rourkela, he headed the Rourkela Development Agency (RDA), which was bankrupt for over 20 years and had not been able to build homes for the people who had invested their life's savings with them. Under Pandian's leadership, RDA, was brought about to a 15 crore surplus and within five months of his taking charge they were able to return the money to the people who had been waiting for over 20 years.

In 2005, he was appointed the District Collector of Mayurbhanj district. He was one of the youngest District Collectors in India at that time and was responsible for the largest district in Odisha. He introduced the Single Window System for disbursement of certificates to Persons with Disability. This led to an increase in distribution from 700 certificates a year to 19000 certificates a year. He received the National Award from the President of India for his work in Mayurbhanj. After its success in Mayurbhanj, the Single Window System for PWD certificates was taken up as a national model and implemented throughout the country. He was at that time the only government servant to receive the Helen Keller Award.

In 2007, he served as the collector of Ganjam. During his time in office, Ganjam district received four national awards. The initiatives included implementing direct bank payments for MGNREGS workers, rehabilitation measures for persons with disabilities, reducing HIV cases and resolving a land category anomaly benefiting farmers. He also initiated land rights provisions for slum dwellers, which inspired the state-wide Jaga Mission project.

In 2011, Pandian was appointed as the Private Secretary to Chief Minister Naveen Patnaik, a position he held until 2023. In 2019, he was appointed Secretary 5T, (Transformational Initiatives) — a governance model introduced by the Odisha government focusing on Transparency, Technology, Teamwork, Time, and Transformation. Under his leadership, the 5T initiative was implemented across various departments to enhance efficiency, accountability, and service delivery in the state's administration. Many high schools of Odisha have been transformed to Smart Schools.

He oversaw the Shree Jagannath Heritage Corridor Project on Jagannath Temple, Puri. Along with the Puri temple, Pandian has also been overseeing the transformation and upkeep of heritage structures like churches, mosques, and temples in the state.

From sponsoring the Indian national hockey team (both Men and Women) to hosting the Men's FIH Hockey World Cup twice in a row, for his contribution to the promotion of hockey, Pandian received the President's Award by the International Hockey Federation.

=== Retirement and political entry ===
In October 2023, Pandian took voluntary retirement from the IAS, sparking speculation about his entry into active politics. Shortly after, he was appointed as the Chairman of the 5T Initiative (Transformational Initiatives) and Nabin Odisha, with cabinet minister rank, reaffirming his continued influence on governance and development programs in the state.

On 27 November 2023, Pandian joined the Biju Janata Dal formally in presence of party president and Chief Minister of Odisha, Naveen Patnaik. On 9 June 2024 he announced quiting from politics following the set back faced by Biju Janata Dal in the 2024 Odisha Legislative Assembly election.

== Controversies ==
The BJP's Member of Parliament for Bhubaneswar, Aparajita Sarangi had complained about violation of All India Service Conduct (AISC) rules and the Government of India had asked the then Chief Secretary of the Government of Odisha to take appropriate action against Pandian.

Pandian's use of a state helicopter also attracted criticism while he was a serving IAS officer. The swift approval of his Voluntary Retirement (VR) application was another matter that drew criticism from observers, analysts, and politicians.

== Awards and recognition ==
1. National award from the President of India, for the rehabilitation of Persons with Disabilities (PWDs)
2. Helen Keller Award
3. National Award for Working for Persons with AIDS, from the Ministry of Health and Family Welfare.
4. National Award for NREGS (2 times) for the best district in the country - Ganjam by Prime Minister India
5. President's Award by the International Hockey Federation for his contribution to the promotion of hockey.

== See also ==
- Kuniyil Kailashnathan
- Pyarimohan Mohapatra
