= Aliya Alla Magala Ganda =

1997 film directed by Y. Yesudas

- Directed by: Y. Yesudas
- Story by: K. Bhagyaraj
- Based on: Idhu Namma Aalu
- Produced by: Myna Jayaraj
- Starring: Jaggesh; Udaya Bhanu
- Music by: Rajesh Ramanath
- Production company: Vijaya Vinayaka Productions
- Release date: 18 September 1997
- Country: India
- Language: Kannada

Aliya Alla Magala Ganda (transl. Not a son-in-law, but daughter's husband) is a 1997 Indian Kannada film adapted from the 1988 Tamil film Idhu Namma Aalu and directed by Y. Yesudas. The film stars Jaggesh and Udaya Bhanu.

Idhu Namma Aalu had another more similar remake in 2006 titled Ravi Shastri which had Ravichandran in the lead role.

== Plot ==
Raja is an orphan who relocates to his maternal village. He falls in love with the daughter of a henchman there with whose help he got a job.

== Cast ==
- Jaggesh
- Udaya Bhanu
- Kalyan Kumar
- Pramila Joshai
- Sundar Raj
- Bank Janardhan
- Rajaram
- M. S. Karnath
- Kunigal Nagabhushan
- Pramila Joshai

== Soundtrack ==
- Music: Rajesh Ramanath
- Record Label: Manoranjan Audio
1. Saniha Saniha –
2. Thaila Thaila –
3. Karanji Karanji –
