= Idhu Namma Aalu =

Idhu Namma Aalu (transl. Our Man) can refer to two Indian Tamil-language films:

- Idhu Namma Aalu (1988 film)
- Idhu Namma Aalu (2016 film)
