= Madhumati (2013 film) =

- Poster
- Directed by: Raaj Shreedhar
- Written by: Raaj Shreedhar
- Produced by: Kadiyam Ramesh; K. Ranishreedhar
- Starring: Udaya Bhanu; Vishnupriyan
- Cinematography: Raaj Shreedhar
- Music by: Raj Kiran
- Release date: 13 December 2013
- Running time: 179 minutes
- Country: India
- Language: Telugu

Madhumati is a 2013 Indian Telugu-language film written and directed by Raaj Shreedhar starring Udaya Bhanu as a sex worker and Vishnupriyan.

== Cast ==
- Udaya Bhanu as Madhumati
- Vishnupriyan as Karthik
- Telangana Shakuntala as Karthik's grandmother
- Diksha
- Seetha
- Prabhas Sreenu
- Venu Yeldandi
- Bustop Koteshwar Rao
- Nagabhairava Arun Kumar

== Production ==
Udaya Bhanu turned down a song after agreeing to do it initially. She filed a police complaint against the director and producer for using morphed images of her on film posters.

== Reception ==
Ch Sushil Rao of The Times of India rated hte film 1.5/5 stars and wrote, "Watching the film could be a nightmare. Stay away from this Madhumati, if you value your time".
