= Emar Matha =

Indian matha

Emar Matha or Embar Mutt (in Odia : ଏମାର ମଠ ; in Tamil : எம்பார் மடம்) was a sri vaishnavite matha or monastery located in the south-eastern (agneya kona) corner of the Jagannatha Temple in Puri, Odisha, outside the main Prakara near Kalikadevi Sahi. It formed a significant hallmark of South Indian influence in the city, and was renowned for its ancient library, the Raghunandana library.

The building used to be a composite complex that expanded over centuries. The structure was renovated during the Maratha rule of Odisha, but retained elements from earlier medieval era, featuring Kalingan architecture. Such as the doorjambs of Emar Mutt, which were noteworthy for having all the features of the Kalingan style. The matha housed images of Krishna and Radha, along with Rama Parivaram.

Embar Mutt is demolished in 2019 by the Odisha government under the HRIDAY scheme of Central government, for beautification purposes and facilitating pilgrims' circulation through the Shree Jagannath Heritage Corridor.

== History ==
Ramanuja, the Srivaishnava theologian and religious leader of the 11th and 12th centuries, established this Mutt while coming to Puri. It is said that Govindacharya was its first pontiff or Jeeyar, a brotherly cousin of Ramanuja, known for having saved him from Yadavaprakasha's conspiracy. The monastery is named after a title given to Govinda by Ramanujacharya, Embar or Emar, a revised form of the locution Emperumanar (எம்பெருமானார் ; « My Lord » in Tamil).

It used to be one of the biggest and oldest mutts in Puri, belonging to the Thengalai sect of the Srivaishnava sampradaya. The monastery had great impacts on the history of the city and overall the region, notably through its large and generous social activities during the Orissa famine of 1866. Biswanath Das (1911–1995) was one of the key figure associated with the Mutt and served the Mutt during Ramanuja II. A statesman and intellectual, he was an avid reader and had excellent command of Odia, Sanskrit and Bengali and is known to have read more than 1000 books that once were in the Mutt's Raghunandan library, the oldest library of Puri before it was demolished. People far from the Odisha state would visit him for consultation on legal matters. During his time with Mutt as an advisor which he served for more than 60 years, three Mahants were made in those six decades. He used to reside in Daitapara Sahi, Puri.

== Archaeology ==
Approximately 18 tonnes of ancient silver treasure have been recovered from the mutt. The destruction of the monastery was used by miscreants to steal several valuables (precious metal, ritual jewelleries, artworks, etc.) from the institution.

== See also ==
- Ramanuja
- Ranganatha
- Melkote
