= Duck adenovirus 1 =

Virus classification
- (unranked): Virus
- Realm: Varidnaviria
- Kingdom: Bamfordvirae
- Phylum: Preplasmiviricota
- Class: Pharingeaviricetes
- Order: Rowavirales
- Family: Adenoviridae
- Genus: Barthadenovirus
- Species: Barthadenovirus galloanserae

Species of virus

Duck adenovirus 1 is a species of hemagglutinating adenovirus implicated in egg drop syndrome.

== Alternative names ==
The virus is or has been known by the following names:

- 127 virus
- Group III avian adeno virus
- Egg drop syndrome virus
- Avian adenovirus EDS
- Eggdrop syndrome-1976 virus
- Adenovirus 127
- Duck adenovirus A
- Duck atadenovirus A

== Strains ==
Strain 127 is the strain of the virus that was isolated and studied after the outbreak of egg drop syndrome 1976, and where the identification of the exact virus was first made. The virus was first called Adenovirus 127 after this strain, before being named Duck adenovirus A. This strain was the first strain of the virus to get a full genome sequence in the GenBank database. The scientific name of the virus was renamed Duck atadenovirus A in 2013 and Barthadenovirus galloanserae in 2024.

== Genome ==
The virus genome uses the standard genetic code.

Various complete genome sequences exist, including:

1. Full genome of isolate FJ12025.
2. Avian adenovirus EDS complete genome.
