= Vishnupriyan =

Indian film actor

- Born: Pollachi, Tamil Nadu, India
- Occupation: Actor

Vishnupriyan is an Indian actor, who has appeared in lead roles in Tamil language films.

== Career ==
Vishnupriyan made his acting debut in Adoor Gopalakrishnan's Malayalam film Nizhalkuthu (2002), and has since portrayed leading and supporting roles in Malayalam and Tamil cinema. During the early stages of his acting career, Vishnupriyan also trained at the drama troupe, Koothu-P-Pattarai.

At the peak of his career in the late 2000s and early 2010s, Vishnupriyan played a series of lead roles in films such as Unakkaga En Kadhal (2010) and Mye (2012), and supporting roles in the college drama Ninaithale Inikkum (2009) and the action thriller Ayyanar (2010). He returned to Malayalam cinema in a supporting role in Puthiya Mukham (2009) and Simhasanam (2012) after being encouraged by Prithviraj, who he had befriended during the making of Ninaithale Inikkum.

In the late 2010s and early 2020s, his appearances in films became more sparse and Vishnupriyan subsequently moved on to become a co-director in films, first working on Hitlist (2024).

== Filmography ==
Year	Film	Role	Language	Notes
2002	Nizhalkuthu		Malayalam	
2006	Ilakkanam	Thamizharasan	Tamil	
2008	Thotta	Giri	Tamil	
2009	Puthiya Mukham	Venki	Malayalam	
2009	Ninaithale Inikkum	Bala	Tamil	
2010	Ayyanar	Saravanan	Tamil	
2010	Unakkaga En Kadhal	Ramu	Tamil	
2010	Kadhal Meipada	Shiva	Tamil	
2012	Mye		Tamil	
2012	Simhasanam	Govindan	Malayalam	
2013	Arya Surya	Suryananda	Tamil	
2013	Madhumati	Karthik	Telugu	
2016	Angali Pangali	Karthik	Tamil	
2018	Merlin	Vetri	Tamil	
2021	Sonnadhe Tirippi Tirippi Solladhe		Tamil	
2023	Mayilanji		Tamil	
