= D/o Prasad Rao: Kanabadutaledu =

- Genre: Suspense thriller
- Written by: Poluru Krishna
- Screenplay by: Poluru Krishna
- Directed by: Poluru Krishna
- Starring: Rajeev Kanakala; Udaya Bhanu; Vasanthika
- Music by: Sriram Maddury
- Country of origin: India
- Original language: Telugu

Production
- Producer: K.V.SRIRAM
- Cinematography: K. Mahesh Kumar
- Editor: G. V. Chandrashekar
- Production company: South Indian Screens

Original release
- Network: ZEE5

D/o Prasad Rao: Kanabadutaledu is a 2025 Indian Telugu-language suspense thriller streaming television series. Directed by Poluru Krishna and produced by South Indian Screens, the series stars Rajeev Kanakala as Prasad Rao, Udaya Bhanu in a key role, and Vasanthika as Swathi.

== Story ==
The series follows Prasad Rao, a father driven to uncover the truth behind his daughter Swathi's sudden disappearance. His search leads him into a maze of buried secrets and personal betrayals that shake the foundations of family and friendship.

== Cast ==
- Rajeev Kanakala as Prasad Rao
- Udaya Bhanu as Rebecca Joseph
- Vasanthika Macha as Swathi
- Gayathri Bhargavi as Bhavani
- Sujatha
- Hima Bindhu

== Marketing ==
The trailer for the series was released on 27 February 2026.

== Reception ==
Writing for The Hindu, Srivathsan Nadadhur gave a critical review, stating that "D/O Prasad Rao Kanabadutaledu is a needless addition to the worryingly growing list of vigilante sagas with reductive tropes. It appears slick because it does not want to let viewers think; it does not have much to say either".

OTTPlay also awarded the show a 2.5/5 rating, describing it as a "sensible message wrapped in familiar drama" where the core suspense occasionally went missing when most needed. On the other hand, NTV Telugu gave a more positive rating of 2.75/5, highlighting Rajeev Kanakala as the "main strength" of the series and noting that despite some logical misses, the director managed to keep the audience engaged through its six-episode run.

The Hans India characterized the series as a "family-friendly drama" with a meaningful message about parental responsibility, praising Udaya Bhanu’s subtle yet impactful portrayal of a police officer. Sakshi Post wrote "Focus leans more toward emotional drama than investigative detailing".
