= Thenkatchiperumalnatham =

- Village
- Country: India
- State: Tamil Nadu
- District: Ariyalur

Population (2001)
  - Total: 1,872

Languages
  - Official: Tamil
- Time zone: UTC+5:30 (IST)
- Vehicle registration: TN-
- Coastline: 0 kilometres (0 mi)
- Sex ratio: 948 ♂/♀
- Literacy: 67.21%

Thenkatchiperumalnatham is a village in the Udayarpalayam taluk of Ariyalur district, Tamil Nadu, India.

== Demographics ==
As per the 2001 census, Thenkatchiperumalnatham had a total population of 1872 with 961 males and 911 females.

== Notable people ==
- Thenkachi Ko. Swaminathan (1946 -2009) - Tamil orator, television personality and author; former deputy director of All India Radio, Chennai.
