= Simhasanam (2012 film) =

2012 Malayalam action film

- DVD cover
- Directed by: Shaji Kailas
- Written by: Shaji Kailas
- Produced by: S. Chandrakumar
- Starring: Prithviraj Sukumaran; Sai Kumar
- Cinematography: Shaji Kumar; Vishnu Narayanan; Saravanan
- Edited by: Don Max
- Music by: Ronnie Raphael
- Production company: Malavika Productions
- Distributed by: Central Pictures
- Release date: 10 August 2012
- Running time: 160 minutes
- Country: India
- Language: Malayalam

Simhasanam (transl. Throne) is a 2012 Indian Malayalam-language action drama written and directed by Shaji Kailas. The film stars Prithviraj Sukumaran and Saikumar. The music was composed by Ronnie Raphael.

Simhasanam was originally meant to be a remake of the Mohanlal-starrer Naduvazhikal but during scripting, it became different from the original story. It was then loosely adaptated from Mario Puzo's The Godfather.

== Premise ==
Chandragiriyil Arjun is a student in Manipal and the son of Chandragiriyil Madhava Menon, a very wealthy landlord in Chandragiri, Palakkad. One day, Arjun is called from Manipal and learns about constants struggles between Madhava Menon's enemy Ramadhathan Unni's sons Ramanunni, Bhargavanunni and Krishnanunni who runs a franchise of grocery stores called Annapoorna. Arjun decides to restore order and secretly fight back Ramanunni and his brothers as Madhava Menon doesn't want him to become violent.

== Cast ==
- Prithviraj Sukumaran as Chandragiri Arjun Menon/Arjunan (Achu)
- Sai Kumar as Chandragiri Madhava Menon, Arjun's father
- Siddique as Ramanunni, the main antagonist
- Devan as Bhargavanunni, Ramanunni's elder brother and secondary antagonist
- Biju Pappan as Jamal, Madhavan Menon's right hand and Arjun's friend
- Jayakrishnan as Krishnanunni, Ramanunni's and Bhargavanunni's younger brother
- Jayan Cherthala as Cheriyappilli Mukundan, Annapoorna's family arch rival
- Pradeep Chandran as Cheriyappilli Sadanandan
- Thilakan as Bishop
- Vandana Menon as Lakshmi (Lechu), Arjun's love interest
- Aishwarya Devan as Nanda
- Kunchan as Pisharadi, Madhavamenon's assistant
- V. K. Sreeraman as Kollamkottu Krishna Sharma
- Riyaz Khan as SP Vetrivel Maaran IPS, Madhava Menon's enemy
- Vijayakumar as SP Chandrashekharan IPS, Madhava Menon's family friend
- Manikuttan as Suresh, Arjun's friend
- Rajeev Parameshwar as Lokan, Arjun's Friend
- Vishnupriyan as Govindan, Arjun's friend
- P. Sreekumar as Chief Minister Chacko
- T. P. Madhavan as Issac
- Irshad as Adv. Manilal (Cameo appearance)
- Kollam Ajith as Razool Musthafa
- Shammi Thilakan as V. S. Nair, Customs Officer (Cameo appearance)
- Ramu as Kuruvila Jacob
- Sana as Hemalatha Gundappa
- Kishore as new SP
- Santhosh as Dasan, Lechu's uncle
- Nandu Poduval as Khader
- Gayathri
- Geetha Nair
- Rema Devi
- Gayathri Priya

== Soundtrack ==
The music was composed by Ronnie Raphael and the lyrics were penned by Chitoor Gopi.

Track	Song	Singer(s)	Duration
1	"Aandava Muruga"	M. G. Sreekumar	4:40
2	"O Mayo (F)"	Rimi Tomy	5:12
3	"O Mayo (M)"	Vidhu Pradap	5:11
4	"Innente Muttathe"	Sudeep Kumar	4:38
5	"Dharmam Pakarna"	Sudeep Kumar	4:36

== Reception ==
Simhasanam was released on 10 August 2012 and received negative reviews from critics and became a box-office bomb.

The Times of India wrote "Simhasanam flimsily pieces together some of the most celebrated cinematic moments that Malayalam viewers have watched and relished countless times. It is nothing more than a foiled attempt to craft a film with one-liners, prolonged dialogues and action sequences."

Lensmen criticized the film and wrote "Overall, Simhasanam is an outdated mix of old hit movies. Only die hard Prithviraj fans will find this movie interesting. Simahasanam is not written and directed by Shaji Kailas. It is arranged and organized by him. " Rediff criticized the film saying that it "is a mixture of the director's hits post-1990s, a patchwork of a story with nothing for the viewer to take back".

== Trivia ==
Simhasanam is the only film in which Shaji Kailas directed a film with the script written by him, as his previous family background films such as Aaraam Thampuran, Narasimham and Madirasi were from scripts written by Ranjith and Rajesh Jayaraman. This is the first time that Shaji Kailas directed a film with Prithviraj in the lead role. Despite Simhasanam being a disaster, Shaji Kailas and Prithviraj further worked together in two films Kaduva and Kaapa, both released in 2022.
