= Tamil Nadu Agricultural University =

Government Agriculture University of Tamil Nadu

- Former names: The Madras Agriculture School, Saidapet (1876 - 1905)
- Motto: Uzhuvōm, Ulaippōm, Uyarvōm
- Motto in English: Till, Toil, Triumph
- Architecture: Indo-Saracenic architecture
- Type: Public
- Established: 1906; 120 years ago
- Founder: Sir. Arthur Lawley (1906)
- Parent institution: Indian Council of Agricultural Research
- Accreditation: NAAC A+
- Affiliations: UGC, ICAR
- Chancellor: Governor of Tamil Nadu
- Vice-Chancellor: Dr. K. Subrahmaniyan (acting)
- Dean: Dr. N. Venkatesa Palaniswamy (Agriculture)
- Pro Chancellor: Minister for Agriculture and Farmers Welfare of the State
- Academic staff: 934
- Students: 8369 under graduates; 870 post graduates
- Location: Lawley Road, Marudhamalai Via, Coimbatore, Tamil Nadu, 641003, India; 11.01236°N 76.93559°E
- Campus: 1,350 acres (550 ha); Urban
- Language: English, Tamil
- Website: www.tnau.ac.in

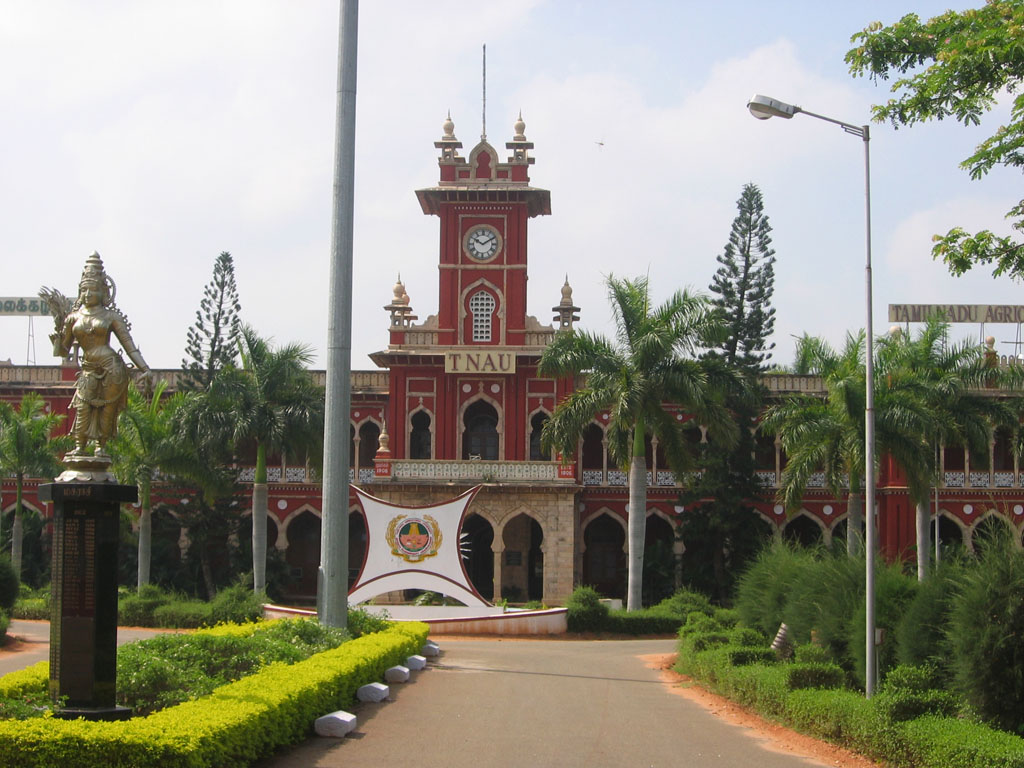
TNAU, Coimbatore

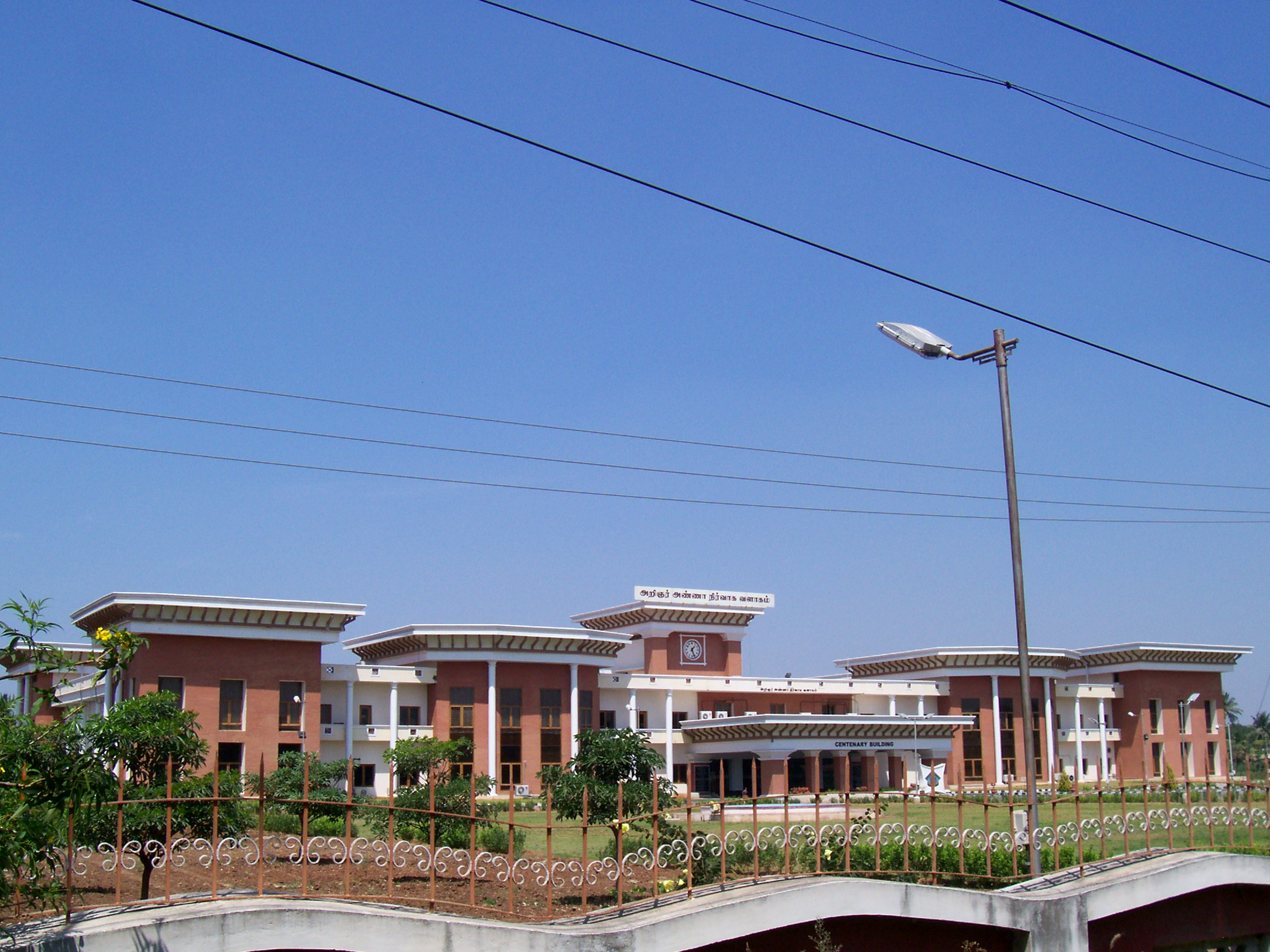
Centenary block of the Tamil Nadu Agricultural University, Coimbatore

TNAU - Tamil Nadu Agricultural University, Coimbatore

Tamil Nadu Agricultural University (TNAU) is the state owned Public agricultural university of Tamil Nadu headquartered in Coimbatore, Tamil Nadu, India. It is the first State Agriculture University (SAU) of India to be recognised by the Indian Council of Agricultural Research (ICAR).

== Academics ==
The university offers 14 undergraduate programs across 19 Government Agriculture Colleges and 28 Affiliated Private agriculture colleges throughout the state. Out of 14 UG programmes, only B.Sc. (Hons) Agriculture and B.Sc. (Hons.,) Horticulture are offered by private colleges. Rest are fully offered by TNAU constituent campuses only.

=== Undergraduate Programmes ===
==== Government Aided ====
B.Sc (Hons) Agriculture, B.Sc Agriculture (Tamil), B.Sc (Hons) Horticulture, B.Sc Horticulture (Tamil), B.Sc (Hons) Sericulture, B.Sc (Hons) Forestry, B.Sc (Hons) Food Nutrition & Dietetics, B.Sc (Hons) Agri Business Management.

==== Self-Financed ====
B.Tech Agricultural Engineering, Energy & Environmental Engineering, Biotechnology, Bioinformatics, Agriculture Information Technology, Food Technology.

=== Postgraduate Programmes ===
==== Agriculture Stream ====
M.Sc in Agricultural Economics, Extension Education, Agribusiness, Agronomy, Plant Physiology, Meteorology, Soil Science, Microbiology, Nanoscience, Environmental Science, Remote Sensing & GIS, Molecular Biology & Biotechnology, Genetics & Plant Breeding, Seed Science, Entomology, Bioinformatics, Plant Pathology, Nematology, Agricultural Statistics.

==== Horticulture ====
M.Sc in Fruit Science, Vegetable Science, Floriculture & Landscaping, Plantation/Spices/Medicinal & Aromatic Crops.

==== Forestry ====
M.Sc in Forest Biology, Silviculture & Agroforestry, Forest Products & Utilization.

==== Sericulture ====
M.Sc Sericulture.

==== Food Science ====
M.Sc Food & Nutrition.

==== Engineering ====
M.Tech in Farm Machinery & Power, Renewable Energy, Processing & Food Engineering, Soil Conservation Engineering.

=== Doctoral Programmes ===
Ph.D offered in all major agricultural, horticultural, forestry, sericulture, food science, and agricultural engineering disciplines, including Agronomy, Soil Science, Genetics & Breeding, Plant Pathology, Entomology, Environmental Science, Nanoscience, Remote Sensing & GIS, Agricultural Statistics, Food & Nutrition, and various engineering specializations.

== Rankings ==
University rankings

General – international
- QS (Asia) (2023): 301–350
- Times (World) (2023): 1501+
- Times (Asia) (2022): 501+
- Times (Emerging) (2022): 501+

Internationally, Tamil Nadu Agricultural University was ranked 301–350 in Asia by the QS World University Rankings of 2023. It was ranked 1501+ in the world by the Times Higher Education World University Rankings of 2023, 501+ in Asia in 2022 and the same among emerging economies.

It was ranked 6th in the Agriculture and allied sector institutions of India by the National Institutional Ranking Framework for 2025 and an overall university ranking of 88th all over India.

== University Constituent Campuses ==
The university has 19 constituent colleges across the state. The below furnished list is of 2024 status.

| No. | Name | Short Name | Location | District | Estd | Status | Image | Website |
|---|---|---|---|---|---|---|---|---|
| 1 | Agricultural College and Research Institute, Coimbatore | AC & RI, CBE | TNAU, Coimbatore | Coimbatore | 1908 | University Main Campus | | https://tnau.ac.in/site/acri-coimbatore/ |
| 2 | School of Post Graduate Studies, Coimbatore | SPGS, CBE | TNAU, Coimbatore | Coimbatore | 1965 | University Main Campus | | https://tnau.ac.in/site/pgschooltnau/ |
| 3 | Agricultural College and Research Institute, Madurai | AC & RI, MDU | Othakadai, Madurai | Madurai | 1965 | University Constituent College | | https://tnau.ac.in/site/college-acrimadurai/ |
| 4 | V.O. Chidambaranar Agricultural College and Research Institute, Killikulam | VOC AC &RI, KKM | Killikulam, Valanaadu | Thoothukudi | 1985 | University Constituent College | | https://tnau.ac.in/site/college-acri-killikulam/ |
| 5 | Anbil Dharmalingam Agricultural College and Research Institute | ADACRI, TRICHY | Navalur Kuttapattu | Tiruchirappalli | 1989 | University Constituent College | | https://tnau.ac.in/site/adcri-trichy/ |
| 6 | Agricultural Engineering College and Research Institute, Coimbatore | AEC & RI, CBE | TNAU, Coimbatore | Coimbatore | 1972 | University Main Campus | | https://tnau.ac.in/site/aecri-cbe/ |
| 7 | Agricultural Engineering College and Research Institute, Kumulur | AEC & RI, KMLR | Kumulur, Lalgudi | Tiruchirapalli | 1992 | University Constituent College | | https://tnau.ac.in/site/aecri-kumulur/ |
| 8 | Horticultural College and Research Institute, Coimbatore | HC & RI, CBE | TNAU, Coimbatore | Coimbatore | 1972 | University Main Campus | | https://tnau.ac.in/site/hcri-coimbatore/ |
| 9 | Horticultural College and Research Institute Periyakulam | HC & RI, PKM | Periyakulam | Theni | 1990 | University Constituent College | | https://tnau.ac.in/site/college-hcriperiyakulam/ |
| 10 | Horticultural College and Research Institute for Women | HCRIW, TRICHY | Navalur Kuttapattu | Tiruchirappalli | 2012 | University Constituent College | | https://tnau.ac.in/site/college-hrciw/ |
| 11 | Community Science College & Research Institute, Madurai | CSC & RI, MDU | Madurai | Madurai | 1984 | University Constituent College | | https://tnau.ac.in/site/college-cscmadurai/ |
| 12 | Forest College and Research Institute, Mettupalayam | FC & RI, MTPM | Mettupalayam | Coimbatore | 1990 | University Constituent College | | https://tnau.ac.in/site/college-fcri-mettupalayam/ |
| 13 | Dr. M.S. Swaminathan Agricultural College & Research Institute, Eachankottai | Dr. MSS AC & RI, ECK | Eachankottai | Thanjavur | 2014 | University Constituent College | | https://tnau.ac.in/site/college-thanjavur/ |
| 14 | Agricultural College & Research Institute, Vazhavachanur | AC & RI, VVNR | Vazhavachanur | Thiruvannamalai | 2014 | University Constituent College | | http://tnau.ac.in/site/college-vazhavachanur/ |
| 15 | Agricultural College & Research Institute, Kudumiyanmalai | AC & RI, KDM | Kudimiyanmalai | Pudukkottai | 2014 | University Constituent College | | https://tnau.ac.in/site/college-acri-kudumiyanmalai/ |
| 16 | Horticulture College and Research Institute, Paiyur | HC & RI, PYR | Paiyur | Krishnagiri | 2016 | University Constituent College | | https://tnau.ac.in/site/hcri-paiyur/ |
| 17 | Agricultural College & Research Institute, Chettinad | AC & RI, CND | Chettinad, Karaikudi | Sivaganga | 2021 | University Constituent College | | https://tnau.ac.in/site/acri-chettinad/ |
| 18 | Agricultural College & Research Institute, Karur | AC & RI, KRR | Karur | Karur | 2021 | University Constituent College | | http://tnau.ac.in/site/acri-karur |
| 19 | Agricultural College & Research Institute, Keezhvelur | AC & RI, KLVLR | Keezhvelur | Nagapattinam | 2021 | University Constituent College | | http://tnau.ac.in/site/acri-keezhvelur |

== Affiliated private colleges ==
This is a list of 28 private colleges affiliated with Tamilnadu Agriculture University and their direct web links attached below.

Tamil Nadu Agricultural University - Affiliated Colleges as of 2020
| No. | College Name | Location | Courses offered |
|---|---|---|---|
| 1 | Adhiparasakthi Agricultural College (APAC) | Vellore | B.Sc.(Hons.) Agriculture |
| 2 | Adhiparasakthi Horticultural College (APHC) | Ranipet | B.Sc.(Hons.) Horticulture |
| 3 | Thanthai Roever Institute of Agriculture and Rural Development (TRIARD) | Perambalur | B.Sc.(Hons.) Agriculture |
| 4 | Vanavarayar Institute of Agriculture (VIA) | Pollachi | B.Sc.(Hons.) Agriculture |
| 5 | Imayam Institute of Agriculture and Technology (IIAT) | Tiruchirappalli | B.Sc.(Hons.) Agriculture |
| 6 | PGP College of Agricultural Sciences (PGPCAS) | Namakal | B.Sc.(Hons.) Agriculture |
| 7 | RVS Agricultural College | Thanjavur | B.Sc.(Hons.) Agriculture |
| 8 | College of Agricultural Technology (CAT) | Theni | B.Sc.(Hons.) Agriculture |
| 9 | Kumaraguru Institute of Agriculture (KIA) | Erode | B.Sc.(Hons.) Agriculture |
| 10 | JKK Munirajah College of Agricultural Science (JKKMCAS) | Erode | B.Sc.(Hons.) Agriculture |
| 11 | Don Bosco College of Agriculture | Ranipettai District | B.Sc.(Hons.) Agriculture |
| 12 | RVS Padmavathy College of Horticulture | Dindugul | B.Sc.(Hons.) Horticulture |
| 13 | JSA College of Agriculture and Technology (JSACAT) | Cuddalore | B.Sc.(Hons.) Agriculture |
| 14 | SRS Institute of Agriculture and Technology (SRSIAT) | Dindugul | B.Sc.(Hons.) Agriculture |
| 15 | S. Thangapazham Agricultural College (STAC) | Tenkasi | B.Sc.(Hons.) Agriculture |
| 16 | Sethu Bhaskara Agricultural College and Research Foundation | Karaikudi | B.Sc.(Hons.) Agriculture |
| 17 | Nammazhvar College of Agriculture and Technology (NCAT) | Ramanathapuram | B.Sc.(Hons.) Agriculture |
| 18 | Adhiyamman College of Agriculture and Research | Krishnagiri | B.Sc.(Hons.) Agriculture |
| 19 | Krishna College of Agriculture and Technology (KRISAT) | Madurai | B.Sc.(Hons.) Agriculture |
| 20 | The Indian Agricultural College (TIAC) | Thirunelveli | B.Sc.(Hons.) Agriculture |
| 21 | Nalanda College of Agriculture (NCA) | Tiruchirappalli | B.Sc.(Hons.) Agriculture |
| 22 | Aravindhar Agricultural Institute of Technology (AAIT) | Thiruvannamalai | B.Sc.(Hons.) Agriculture |
| 23 | Palar Agricultural College (PAC) | Vellore | B.Sc.(Hons.) Agriculture |
| 24 | Dhanalakshmi Srinivasan Agriculture College (DSAC) | Perambalur | B.Sc.(Hons.) Agriculture |
| 25 | Mother Terasa College of Agriculture (MTCA) | Pudukkottai | B.Sc.(Hons.) Agriculture |
| 26 | Pushkaram College of Agriculture Sciences (PCAS) | Pudukkottai | B.Sc.(Hons.) Agriculture |
| 27 | MIT College of Agriculture and Technology | Tiruchirappalli | B.Sc.(Hons.)Agriculture Diploma in Agriculture Diploma in Horticulture |
| 28 | Jaya Agricultural College | Tiruvallur | B.Sc.(Hons.) Agriculture |
| 29 | Indian Institute of Food Processing Technology | Thanjavur | B.Tech(FPE) M.Tech(FPE) Ph.D(FPE) M.Tech(FS&T) |

== Courses and grading system ==
All the undergraduate programs take place for four academic years. Every academic year comprises two semesters, each of 105 working days. Every semester has numerous courses of which a student can register not more than 22 credit hours including non-gradial compulsory courses.

Courses are given with Credit hours like

AGR 101 INTRODUCTION TO AGRONOMY AND AGRICULTURE HERITAGE (1+1)

- Here, AGR 101 is the course code,
- INTRODUCTION TO AGRONOMY AND AGRICULTURE HERITAGE is the course title.
- 1+1 is the credit hour. It represents 1 Theory class ( 60 minutes) and 1 Practical class (150 minutes) per Week.

Similarly, if a course is (0+1) like PED 102 PHYSICAL EDUCATION, no theory classes involved.

== Examination system ==
The question preparation, scheduling, and evaluation all are done by the Controllerate of Examinations - TNAU (CoE) situated within the TNAU Coimbatore campus. To maintain the confidentiality of Question Paper, CoE sometimes depends on any ICAR Institute or any deemed University to set questions for TNAU semester exams.

=== UG courses ===
Any UG Degree comprises four academic years. Every academic year is divided into two semesters, odd and even. Every semester has 105 working days. A mid-semester exam is conducted for all subjects at 55th working day and the following week. Final Practical Examination conducted at the last week of semester and the semester ends when the practical ends. Then the final Theory Examination is conducted and Holidays are announced.

According to 2025 Question system, Mid-Semester exam is quantized for 20 marks. 40 Multiple Choice questions to be answered in OMR Valuation Sheet. Each question carries 0.5 marks. Final practical Examination comprises 40 marks. And Final Theory Examination contributes 40 Marks.

These 20 + 40 + 40 summed up to 100.

50 out of 100 is a pass satisfying the conditions that An aggregate of 50% should be obtained separately in Mid-Semester + Theory and Practical. A candidate should get an GPA of 5 out of 10 to pass the semester. GPA of greater than 8 is considered First Class Pass.

=== PG, Doctoral courses ===
The exam question pattern is similar but only the number of academic year changes. These candidates will have only two academic years.

== Timeline ==
=== 19th Century ===
- 1868: Agricultural School was started at Saidapet, Chennai (Madras).

=== 20th Century ===
- 1906: The Saidapet Agricultural School was shifted to Coimbatore and foundation stone laid for Madras Agricultural College.
- 1908: Students were admitted to education program leading to Licentiate in Agriculture (L. Ag.)
- 1909: Opening of Agricultural College and Research Institute (AC & RI) by Sir Arthur Lawley.
- 1920: The AC & RI was affiliated to Madras University. A new course of study leading to a three-year degree in Agriculture -B.Sc. (Ag.) was started.
- 1945: Second Agricultural College was started at Bapatla (Now in Andhra Pradesh).
- 1958: Regional Post-Graduate Centre was established to offer programs leading to master's degree in Agriculture & Horticulture. In Annamalai university, Agriculture teaching started leading to award of M.Sc.(Ag)in Horticulture first of its kind in India.
- 1960: Integrated system with four year B.Sc. (Ag) degree program after pre-university education was introduced and subsequently doctoral programme in Agriculture was started.
- 1965: Third Agricultural College was started at Madurai, Tamil Nadu and the Masters program at Madurai was introduced during 1969.
- 1971: The Tamil Nadu Agricultural University came into existence with Coimbatore as its headquarters. The first vice chancellor Dr.G.Rengasamy was from ANNAMALAI UNIVERSITY which was having Faculty of Agriculture from 1958 onwards teaching agriculture and horticulture.
- 1972: A separate Faculty of Horticulture was established and a degree program in Horticulture - B.Sc. (Hort.) was introduced. The College of Agricultural Engineering was established at Coimbatore and a bachelor's degree program in Agricultural Engineering - B.E.(Ag) was introduced.
- 1973: Doctoral program was introduced in Horticultural College and Research Institute, Coimbatore.
- 1975: Faculty of Post Graduate Education was established in TNAU, Coimbatore and master's and doctoral (1978) programs were started in Environmental Sciences and Biotechnology.
- 1976: The Madras Veterinary College became constituent unit of TNAU and B.V.Sc. degree program was suitably restructured*.
- 1977: Bachelor's degree (B.F.Sc.) program in Fisheries Science at Thoothukudi was started*.
- Masters and doctoral program in Agricultural Engineering was introduced.
- 1980: Bachelor's degree (B.Sc. (H.Sc.)) in Home Science was launched in Madurai Campus.
- 1981: Master's program was introduced in Home Science College & Research Institute, Madurai and doctoral program in 1988.
- 1989: Doctoral program in Agriculture was introduced in Agricultural college & Research Institute, Madurai; Masters program introduced in Forest College & Research Institute, Mettupalayam and Horticultural College & Research Institute, Periyakulam.
- 1990: Master's program in Agriculture was introduced in Agricultural College & Research Institute, Killikulam, Thoothukudi district, Tamil Nadu and Doctoral program in Forest College & Research Institute, Mettupalayam.
- 1998: B.Tech. (Food Process Engineering) introduced as self-supporting program.

=== 21st Century ===
- 2002: B.Tech. (Horticulture) and B.Tech. (Agriculture Biotechnology) introduced as self-supporting programs.
- 2004: B.Tech. (Energy and Environmental Engineering) introduced as a self-supporting program.
- 2005: Centennial celebrations of AC&RI, Coimbatore.
- 2006: B.Tech. (Bioinformatics) introduced as a self-supporting program.
- 2007: B.Tech. (Agricultural Information Technology) and B.S.(Agribusiness Management) introduced as a self-supporting programs. Nanotechnology introduced in undergraduate curriculum.
- 2008: Dual Degree Masters Program with Cornell University, Ithaca, USA introduced. Dual degree option with Dalhousie University, Canada established for undergraduate program in B.Tech.(Environmental Landscape Horticulture)
- 2011: B.Sc. (Sericulture) introduced. M.Tech. (Ag.) in Nanotechnology introduced and M.Tech. in Environmental Engineering introduced.
- 2012: Masters program introduced in Plant Genetic Resource and Remote Sensing.
- 2017: Ph.D. (Agri) in Nano Science and Technology introduced.
- 2026: Agricultural College & Research Institute, Chettinad became the TNAU's First constituent college to be Inaugurated by Chief Minister of State in-person.

== Notable alumni ==
- Dr. M. S. Swaminathan, Father of Indian Green Revolution
- C. Sylendra Babu IPS, DGP and former Head of Police Force, Tamil Nadu Police
- V. Irai Anbu IAS, former chief secretary, Government of Tamil Nadu.
- K. Ramasamy
- Thenkachi Ko. Swaminathan
- K. C. Palanisamy
- M. Mahadevappa
- G. Dhinakar Raj
- V. K. Pandian IAS (in constituent college at Madurai)

== Popular Culture ==
The Seven Wells Criminal Court featured in the Tamil Fantasy drama film Karuppu (2026) is the TNAU Main building. Also the film pre-credits included "Thanks to VC, TNAU"

The college premises shown in the film Vaaranam Aayiram during Meera - Krishnan's College love flashback is the Tamil Nadu Agricultural University, Coimbatore.

The college premises and campus in the movie Sillunu Oru Kaadhal is the agricultural university in Coimbatore.

The title song of Vivasayi was filmed at the fields of the Tamil Nadu Agricultural University.

In the movie PT Sir, the High court sequences, were taken at the TNAU.

== See also ==
- List of universities in India
- Universities and colleges in India
- Education in India
- Distance Education Council
- University Grants Commission (India)
- List of Tamil Nadu Government's Educational Institutions
