= Ayyanar (film) =

- Theatrical release poster
- Directed by: Rajamithran
- Written by: Rajamithran
- Produced by: P. L. Thenappan
- Starring: Aadhi; Meera Nandan
- Cinematography: Sri Sriram
- Edited by: Mu.Kasivishwanathan
- Music by: Thaman S
- Production company: Sri Rajalakshmi Films
- Release date: 10 December 2010
- Country: India
- Language: Tamil

Ayyanar is a 2010 Indian Tamil-language action drama film written and directed by Rajamithran and produced by P. L. Thenappan. The film stars Aadhi and Meera Nandan with Vishnupriyan, Rajashree, Santhanam and Anupama Kumar playing supporting roles. The film, which began production in 2009, was released on 10 December 2010.

== Plot ==
Prabha (Aadhi) is the eldest son of his family, who spends all his time with his friends. He is chastised by his father (Jayaprakash) for this. Being a volleyball player comes to his rescue when he finds a part-time job as a volleyball coach at a women's college. His younger brother, Saravanan (Vishnu Priyan), works for a TV channel, and Prabha is often compared to him by the family, which upsets him. The siblings frequently clash with each other. One day, Saravanan is killed, and Prabha is blamed. He goes on the run and soon joins a gang (goonda), working as a henchman for an influential politician (Mahadevan). Prabha starts killing members of the gang one by one. Finally, a flashback reveals that they were responsible for Saravanan's death. Prabha now faces off with the gang.

== Cast ==
- Aadhi as Prabha/Ayyanar
- Meera Nandan as Anitha
- Santhanam as Shiva, Prabha's friend
- Vishnupriyan as Saravanan
- Jayaprakash as Prabha and Saravanan's father
- Anupama Kumar as Prabha and Saravanan's mother
- Mahadevan as Politician
- Ravi Kale as Thanikodi
- Rajashree as Prabha's aunt
- Arpit Ranka as Ramani
- S. S. Kumaran

== Soundtrack ==
The soundtrack was composed by Thaman S. "Aathadi Aathadi" received a high response from audience.

All lyrics are written by Na. Muthukumar.

Track listing
No.	Title	Singer(s)	Length
1.	"Kuthu Kuthu"	Aalap Raju, Bruce Lee, Vel Murugan	5:03
2.	"Paniye Paniye"	Ranjith, Priyadharshini	4:53
3.	"Pachai Kili"	Rahul Nambiar	4:31
4.	"Aathadi Aathadi"	Naveen Madhav	4:15
5.	"Theme" (Instrumental)	–	2:25
Total length:			21:07

== Reception ==
Malathi Rangarajan of The Hindu wrote, "Suspicion, murder and the aftermath form the fulcrum. At a superficial level, it is a chilling story of sibling rivalry, but the suspense, when it is unravelled, has some surprises in store". Sify wrote, "On the whole, Ayyanar is a mass film that is found wanting in tempo and packaging".
