= Rajshri Nair =

Indian actress (born 1977)

- Born: Meisha Aftab
- Education: Kesari Higher Secondary School
- Occupation: Actress
- Years active: 1994–present
- Spouses: Ansari Raja (m. 2009, divorced) Bujankar Rao (m. 2010)

Rajshri Nair (born Meisha Aftab) is an Indian actress known for her works in Tamil, Telugu, and Malayalam cinema and television.

== Career ==
Rajashree made her Tamil debut through Karuthamma (1994) playing the titular role, which won her the Tamil Nadu State Film Award for Best Actress. She starred in the Indian English film Hyderabad Blues (1997). She made her Malayalam debut with Meghasandesam (2001).

== Personal life ==
Rajashree's sister, Bobby, has also appeared in films as an actress.

== Filmography ==
Year	Film	Role	Language	Notes
1994	Gandhada Gudi Part 2		Kannada	credited as Rajeshwari
1994	Karuthamma	Karuthamma	Tamil	Won–Tamil Nadu State Film Award for Best Actress
1995	Neela Kuyil	Shalini	Tamil	
1995	Murai Mappillai	Sorna	Tamil	
1995	Lingababu Love Story	Ragaa	Telugu	
1996	Aavathum Pennale Azhivathum Pennale	Lakshmi	Tamil	
1996	Amman Kovil Vaasalile	Padmini	Tamil	Guest appearance
1996	Vaigarai Pookkal	Deivanai	Tamil	
1996	Anuraga Spandana		Kannada	
1997	Police Bete	Rekha	Kannada	
1997	Hyderabad Blues	Ashwini Rao	English	
1998	King	Rajeshwari	Kannada	credited as Rajeshwari
1999	Sethu		Tamil	
1999	Sautela		Hindi	
2001	Asokavanam	Uma	Tamil	
2001	Nandhaa	Nandhaa's mother	Tamil	
2001	Sonnal Thaan Kaadhala	Roja's sister	Tamil	
2001	Megasandesam	Rosy Samuel	Malayalam	
2001	Ravanaprabhu	Dr Suhra Hydrose	Malayalam	
2002	Run		Tamil	
2002	Game	Malar	Tamil	
2003	Manasellam		Tamil	
2003	Mr. Brahmachari	Sindhu	Malayalam	
2006	Ilakkanam	Malliga	Tamil	
2006	Vettaiyaadu Vilaiyaadu	Chitra Arokyaraj	Tamil	
2006	Neeku Naaku		Telugu	
2007	Ammuvagiya Naan		Tamil	
2007	Sabari	Maragatham	Tamil	
2009	Oru Kadhalan Oru Kadhali	Sumathi	Tamil	
2010	Ayyanar	Prabha's aunt	Tamil	
2012	Porkodi 10am Vaguppu	Porkodi's mother	Tamil	
2012	Bhoopadathil Illatha Oridam	Vimala	Malayalam	
2012	Grandmaster	Commissioner Susan	Malayalam	
2013	Vathikuchi		Tamil	
2015	Agathinai		Tamil	
2015	Chandi Veeran	Saradha	Tamil	
2015	Jamna Pyari	Vimala	Malayalam	
2016	Nenu Sailaja	Shailu's Aunt	Telugu	
2016	Gentleman	Aishwarya's Mother	Telugu	
2024	Vidya Vasula Aham	Vidya’s mother	Telugu	
2025	Vilayath Buddha	Cholaykkal Chembakam	Malayalam	
2025	Meghalu Cheppina Prema Katha	Meghana’s aunt	Telugu	
2025	Telusu Kada	Anjali’s mother	Telugu	
2025	K-Ramp	Kumar’s aunt	Telugu	
2025	Andhra King Taluka	Mahalakshmi’s mother	Telugu	
2026	Sahakutumbaanaam	Tulasi	Telugu	
2026	Suyodhana	Radha	Telugu	
2026	Aakasamlo Oka Tara	Agarwal Foods Owner	Telugu	

=== Television ===
Serials

Year	Title	Role	Language
	Oorvashi	Gowri	Telugu
	Jeevana Tarangalu		Telugu
1998–2001	Ganga Yamuna Saraswati		Tamil
1999–2000	Aalayam		Tamil
2000–2002	Banagaru Bomma		Telugu
2001	Sukha Dukhalu	Soundarya	Telugu
2001–2002	Jee Boom Ba		Tamil
2002	Gangothri		Telugu
2002–2003	Agal Vilakkugal	Seetha	Tamil
2003–2004	Mantra Jalam		Telugu
2004–2005	Sivamayam		Tamil
2004–2005	Naari O Naari		Telugu
2007–2008	Shubhalekha		Telugu
2007	Dracula		Telugu
2008–2009	Naalavathu Mudichu	Ashwini	Tamil
2008–2010	Magal		Tamil
2009–2010	Idhayam	Shakuntala	Tamil
2012	Kadhayile Rajakumari	IPS	Malayalam
2013	Kanmani		Malayalam
2013–2014	Vamsam	Thenmozhi	Tamil
2014–2016	Ramulamma		Telugu
2014–2015	Abhishekam		Telugu
2015–2018	America Ammayi	Kalyani	Telugu
2015–2017	Mahalakshmi		Telugu
2017–2020	Lakshmi Kalyanam	Rajeshwari Devi	Telugu
2018–2020	Rendu Rellu Aaru	Bhanumati	Telugu
2020	Chithi 2	Padma	Tamil
2021	Amrutha Varshini	Amrutha	Telugu
2021–2023	Intiki Deepam Illalu	Maheshwari	Telugu
2021–2022	Kasthuri	Kanchana	Telugu
2021–2022	Rangula Ratnam	Annapoorna	Telugu
2022	Sillunu Oru Kaadhal	Special appearance	Tamil
2022–2024	Amudhavum Annalakshmiyum	Annalakshmi	Tamil
2024	Panchagni	Renuka	Malayalam

Web Series

Year	Title	Role	Language	Platform
2020–2021	Amrutham Dhvitheeyam		Telugu	ZEE5
2022	Recce	Devakamma	Telugu	ZEE5
