= Tribanadhari Barbarik =

Indian Telugu-language thriller film

- Theatrical release poster
- Directed by: Mohan Srivatsa
- Written by: Mohan Srivatsa
- Produced by: Vijaypal Reddy Adidhala
- Starring: Sathyaraj; Vasishta N. Simha; Satyam Rajesh; Udaya Bhanu
- Cinematography: Kushendar Ramesh Reddy
- Edited by: Marthand K. Venkatesh
- Music by: Infusion Band
- Distributed by: A Maruthi Team Product
- Release date: 29 August 2025
- Country: India
- Language: Telugu

Tribanadhari Barbarik is a 2025 Indian Telugu-language thriller film directed by Mohan Srivatsa and starring Sathyaraj, Vasishta N. Simha, Satyam Rajesh, and Udaya Bhanu.

== Plot ==
Dr. Shyam Kathu is a well-known psychiatrist. After losing his son and daughter-in-law, his life becomes centered on granddaughter Nidhi. In parallel, Ram is a B.Tech graduate who desperately wants to go abroad for work. To do this, he needs 30 lakhs, which he does not have. His childhood best friend Dev is a taxi driver at his aunt Vakili Padma's travel service. Padma also runs a big milk business. Ram works at the travel agency part-time for extra cash.

Shyman idolizes a mythological figure named Barbarik, a man who could end a war in seconds using his three arrows. Whoever stands beside him gets immense courage. Nidhi feels that Shyam is her Barbarik.

One day, Nidhi goes missing. After contacting Nidhi's bus driver, Nidhi's friend, and others, Shyam goes to the police station to get help. SI Purushottam is currently working on the case of a minister's missing dog, while Shyam comes to the station. He assigns Chandu, a man scared of dead bodies, to Shyam's case. The first clue is by tracking Nidhi's digital watch. This leads to someone's home, where the man living there had found it on the road. After going down this road, they check the security cameras.

The movie switches back to Ram, who meets Satya while trying to go to America. She helps him get his papers, and they soon fall in love. After Ram kisses Satya and plays around with her, Satya gets flashbacks of her abusive uncle and slaps Ram away. Later in the evening, Satya tells Ram about this, and they reconcile. Dev is part of a drug-smuggling business owned by Dasanna. He hides drugs in dog fur and sells them without the police knowing. Dev owes Dasanna 30 lakhs, but every time he earns any money, he gambles it all away. This leads Dasanna to threaten Dev to tell Padma. Also, Dev is in love with Padma's daughter Mahalakshmi. Padma secretly knows of their relationship and approves of it. After multiple threats from Dasanna and only a week to pay Ram's abroad fees, Dev says the only way to earn money is either by kidnapping or robbing someone.

Meanwhile, after looking at the CCTV footage, Shyam and Chandu see three men in a van kidnapping Nidhi. The men are brought to the station and beaten by Purushottam and Chandu. The men tell what they know. Nidhi was with a boy, who bought some drugs from the men. They saw the boy kissing Nidhi's cheek, but Nidhi slapped him and went away. Then, the three men took Nidhi in their car and attempted to touch her. Nidhi escaped, but one man ripped a bit of her shirt, then she ran away. Shyam and Chandu find out that the boy is from Nidhi's school and is named Pranav. Pranav is a drug addict who smokes a lot. Shyam goes to Pranav's father to inquire, but Pranav is out with his friends smoking. Pranav's father thinks that they are studying and goes to Pranav's friend's house. After cleaning a bit, Pranav goes and talks with Shyam, Chandu, and his father. Nidhi and Pranav, and friends, but Pranav likes Nidhi. When Nidhi needs a textbook, Pranav offers to take her to a shop on his bike. After getting the textbook and riding around for a while, Nidhi and Pranav stop at the location where the man found her watch. Pranav kisses Nidhi, but she slaps him away. After riding home, he sees Nidhi entering a taxi, and her shirt is ripped a bit. On the taxi is a bull symbol.

Meanwhile, Ram steals a minister's granddaughter's puppy. The minister is furious, and Ram demands 50 lakhs for the dog back. The minister agrees but asks the police to help retrieve the puppy without incurring any money loss. Purushottam and three other cops go to the drop-off points along with one of the Minister's men.

== Cast ==
- Sathyaraj as Dr. Shyam Kathu
- Vasishta N. Simha as Ram
- Satyam Rajesh as Constable Satya
- Udaya Bhanu as Vakili Padma
- Sanchi Rai as Satya
- Kranthi Kiran as Dev
- VTV Ganesh as Purushottam
- Rajendran as Dasanna
- Meghana Sunil as Nidhi
- Kaarthikeyaa Dev as Pranav

== Reception ==
A critic from The Hindu wrote, "Tribanadhari Barbarik narrates a familiar story and yet tweaks it just enough to keep the audiences invested for over two hours". A critic from Cinema Express rated the film 1.5/5 and wrote, "the difference between wanting to say something and knowing how to say it is everything. Tribanadhari Barbarik mistakes lecture for drama and reference for depth making it a boring affair for viewers". A critic from Deccan Chronicle wrote, "Tribanadhari Barbarik is impressive, overall. The screenplay is fairly suspenseful". A critic from OTTplay rated the film 3/5 and wrote, "On the whole, Tribanadhari Barbarik is a crime thriller which has simple story but the manner in which it is narrated with decent thrills makes things interesting".
