= Kadhal Meipada =

- Directed by: Ravi Acharya
- Written by: Kumar (dialogues)
- Screenplay by: Ravi Acharya
- Story by: Kumar
- Produced by: Harshi
- Starring: Vishnupriyan; Madhumitha
- Cinematography: G. Chiranjeevi
- Edited by: Suresh Urs
- Music by: Murshak
- Production company: Dvarakamai Cine Production
- Release date: 29 April 2011
- Running time: 145 minutes
- Country: India
- Language: Tamil

Kadhal Meipada (transl. Love is real) is a 2011 Indian Tamil language romance film directed by Ravi Acharya. The film stars Vishnupriyan and Madhumitha, with Thalaivasal Vijay, Kadhal Dhandapani, Ganja Karuppu, Kuyili, Viji Ketti, Kadhal Sukumar, Chaams and Soori playing supporting roles. It was released on 29 April 2011.

== Plot ==
Shiva and Aishwarya are college students who fall in love with each other. Shiva is from a middle-class family, while Aishwarya is the daughter of the heartless gang lord Natarajan. Natarajan is hell-bent to save his family's prestige, so he is against love marriage. Aishwarya, who is scared for Shiva's life, decides to break up with him, but Shiva convinces to believe in their love. When Natarajan learns about their love affair, he makes the police arrest Shiva, and they beat him up in the police lockup. Natarajan then blackmails Aishwarya and forces her to forget Shiva. The couple eventually elopes. Thereafter, their families accept for the marriage, but Shiva and Aishwarya decide to finish their studies first and then marry.

== Cast ==
- Vishnupriyan as Shiva
- Madhumitha as Aishwarya
- Thalaivasal Vijay as Shiva's father
- Kadhal Dhandapani as Natarajan, Aishwarya's father
- Ganja Karuppu as Azhagar, Shiva's uncle
- Kuyili as Shiva's mother
- Viji Ketti as Kamakshi, Aishwarya's mother
- Kadhal Sukumar as Shiva's friend
- Chaams as Narayanan, Shiva's friend
- Soori as Shiva's friend
- Vadivelu David as House owner
- Karate Raja as Aadhi, Aishwarya's uncle
- Sampath Ram as Police inspector
- Sasi as Sasi
- Krishnamoorthy as Fraud
- Suruli Manohar as House Owner
- Kumtaz as Professor
- Archana Harish as Poongavanam
- Julie as Gayathri
- Sopna as Sopna, Shiva's sister
- Minnal Deepa as Deepa

== Production ==
Ravi Acharya made his directorial debut with Kadhal Meipada under the banner of Dvarakamai Cine Production. The film started production in late 2007. Vishnupriyan was cast to play the lead role, while Madhumitha was chosen to play the heroine. Ganja Karuppu was also cast to play the comedian.

== Soundtrack ==
Kadhal Meipada

Soundtrack album by Murshak
- Released: 2009
- Recorded: 2009
- Genre: Feature film soundtrack
- Length: 29:13
- Producer: Murshak

The soundtrack was composed by Murshak. The soundtrack, released in 2009, features 7 tracks. Shree fame T. S. Muralidharan and his assistant Shakthi composed the music of the film under the name of Murshak. The song "Enna Kobam" from Kuzhandhaiyum Deivamum was remixed in this film.

Tracklist
| No. | Title | Writer(s) | Singer(s) | Length |
|---|---|---|---|---|
| 1. | "Ragasiya Thiruda" | Tamil Kumaran | Rahul Nambiar, Vinaya | 4:56 |
| 2. | "Enna Kobam" | Vaali | Yugendran, Vinaya | 3:25 |
| 3. | "Dheemtha Nagida" | Snehan | Shalini Singh | 3:56 |
| 4. | "Mazhaiyae" | Yosi | Ranjith, Priya Prakash | 4:44 |
| 5. | "Enna Pannura" | Snehan | Sajan Madhav, Priya Himesh | 5:16 |
| 6. | "Gnabagam" | Tamil Kumaran | Shalini Singh | 1:53 |
| 7. | "Oh Manidha" | Tamil Kumaran | Balram | 5:03 |
| Total length: | | | | 29:13 |

== Reception ==
Kungumam gave the film a mixed review. Dinamalar called it a "good film".
