= Sujata Rout Karthikeyan =

Indian civil servant (born 1975)

- Sujata Rout Karthikeyan

Commissioner-cum-Secretary, Mission Shakti
- Incumbent
- Assumed office 2021
- Naveen Patnaik: Chief Minister
- Preceded by: position established

Secretary, Department of Odia Language, Literature and Culture
- In office 2020–2023

Special Secretary, Finance Department, Government of Odisha
- In office 2024–2025

Personal details
- Born: 9 May 1975 (age 51) Odisha, India
- Spouse: V. K. Pandian
- Children: 2
- Education: Lady Shri Ram College; Jawaharlal Nehru University
- Occupation: Civil servant

Sujata Rout Karthikeyan (Born on 9 May 1975) is a retired Indian civil servant who served in the Indian Administrative Service (IAS) from 2000 to 2025 in the Odisha cadre. She became the first woman to serve as Collector of Cuttack district.

She is known for leading Mission Shakti, one of Naveen Patnaik’s flagship initiatives focused on women’s empowerment.

She took voluntary retirement in March 2025 and joined Naveen Patnaik’s Biju Janata Dal (BJD).

== Early life and Education ==
Sujata Rout was born on 9 May 1975 to pediatrician Doctor Akshya Rout of Baluria village of Kendrapada district of Odisha.

She studied political science at Lady Shri Ram College, University of Delhi, where she completed a bachelor's degree. She later obtained a master's degree in international politics from Jawaharlal Nehru University.

== Civil service career ==
Sujata joined the Indian Administrative Service in 2000 and was allotted the Odisha cadre. Early in her career she served as a sub-collector at Nabarangpur before moving into district administration.

Sujata also became known for promoting sport among young people in remote villages bordering Jharkhand and Chhattisgarh, distributing footballs and hockey equipment, which earned her the local nickname Football Collector.

=== Cuttack and Social Welfare ===
Sujata became the first woman to serve as District Collector of Cuttack. She subsequently joined the state government as Director of Social Welfare.

=== Mission Shakti ===
Sujata is most closely associated with Mission Shakti, the Government of Odisha's flagship women's empowerment initiative, which works through a state-wide network of women's self-help groups. The programme was constituted as a full-fledged department in June 2021, and she served as its Commissioner-cum-Secretary.

The programme has empowered about 70 lakh women organised under roughly 600,000 self-help groups. Credit linkage to women's groups was reported to have increased from about ₹500 crore to ₹15,000 crore over a period of seven years.

== Personal life ==
Sujata is married to V. K. Pandian, a former IAS officer of the Odisha cadre who later entered politics. The couple have two children.

== Awards ==
During her training at the Lal Bahadur Shastri National Academy of Administration, she received the Ashok Bamawale Award for Best Officer Trainee.
