= Udaya Bhanu (actress) =

Indian presenter and film actress

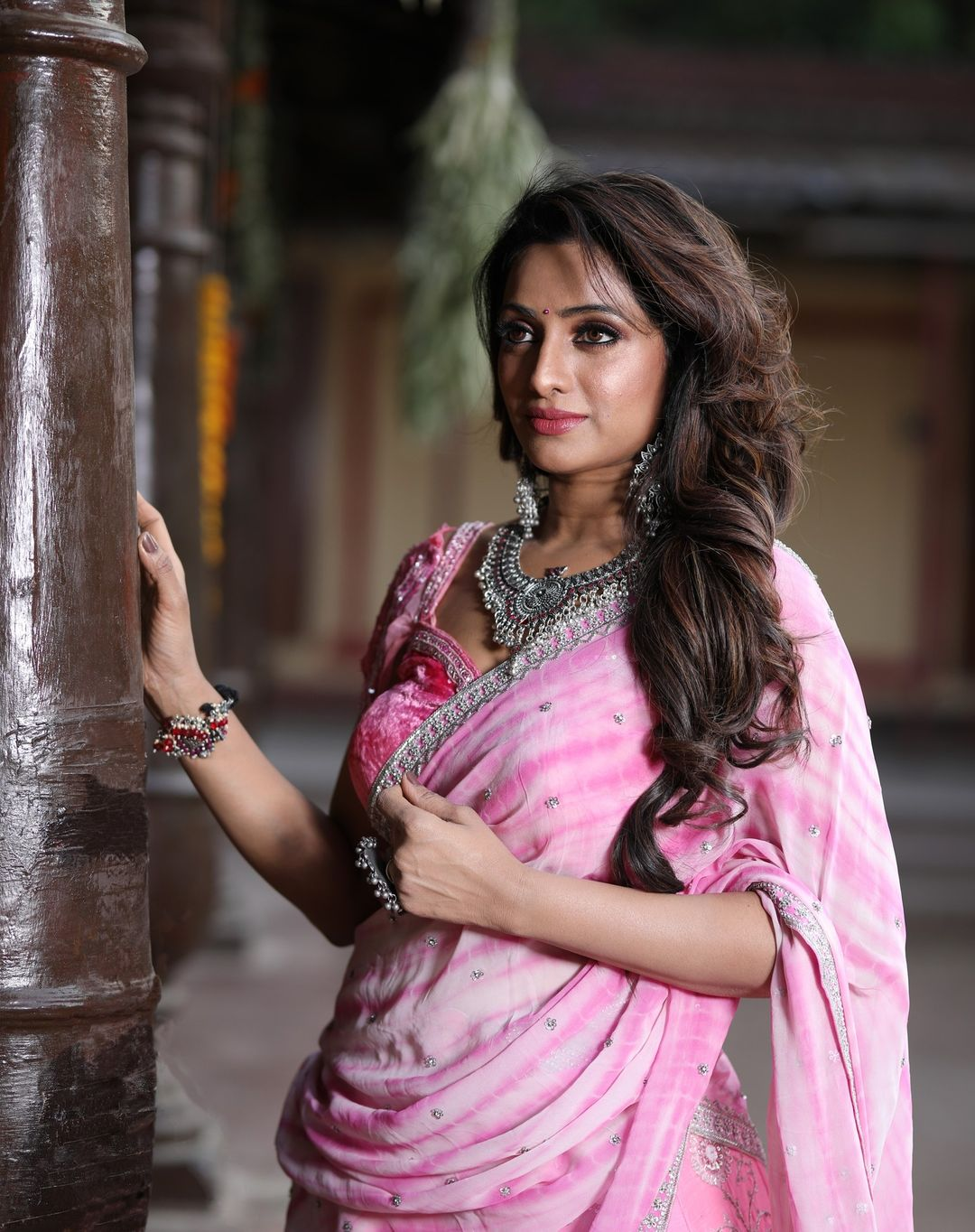
- Born: 6 November 1980 (age 46); Sultanabad, Karimnagar district, Telangana, India
- Occupations: Actress, host, television presenter, performer
- Years active: 1994 - present
- Spouse: Midde Vijayendra Mouli
- Children: Bhumi Aaradya Midde, Yuvi Nakshatra Midde

Udaya Bhanu is an Indian presenter and film actress best known for her work in Telugu television shows.

== Early life ==
Udaya Bhanu Midde was born in Sultanabad, Karimnagar, Telangana, India. Her father S. K. Patel was a doctor and her mother Aruna is an Ayurvedic doctor. She has one brother. Her father also worked as a poet. Udaya Bhanu was named after his pen name. Her father died when Bhanu was four years old. Udaya Bhanu married Midde Vijayendra Mouli. Together, they have two children: Bhumi Aaradya Midde and Yuvi Nakshatra Midde.

Recently in February 2025, Udaya Bhanu shared a video on her Instagram page that her twin daughters received an violin gift from Nara Brahmani, daughter of actor Nandamuri Balakrishna. In the video, her daughters appeared surprised and delighted to receive the gift. They have thanked for the gesture to Nara Brahmani and Nandamuri Balakrishna.

== Career ==
Bhanu made her acting debut in R. Narayana Murthy's Erra Sainyam (1994), when she was at age 14. She appeared in few more Telugu films, including Kondaveeti Simhasanam (2002), Qaidi Brothers (2002) and Shravana Masam (2005). She also played lead roles in a couple of Kannada films and has acted in an unreleased Tamil film Chinna Ramasamy Periya Ramasamy co-starring Jayaram by R. V. Udayakumar. She performed item numbers in three Telugu films Aapada Mokkula Vaadu (2008), Leader (2010) and Julai (2012).

In a September 2026 television interview, Udaya Bhanu discussed the difficulties she faced in her career within the entertainment industry and expressed that some unfair individuals had insulted her caste and prevented her from receiving Nandi Awards.

In August 2026, Bhanu announced that she launched her own production house, named as Udaya Bhanu Productions. She announced this through a video to the audience who supported her throughout her career. She clarified that company has focus on films and digital content while giving opportunities to the new talents. She also announced her first project named Panchanama, a web series with a traditional launch ceremony.

== Filmography ==
Year	Film	Role	Notes
1994	Erra Sainyam	Singanna's sister	
1995	Jai Veer Hanuman	Sita	Hindi film; Lead role (television series)
1995	Vetagaadu		
1997	Aliya Alla Magala Ganda		Kannada film
2002	Qaidi Brothers		Cameo appearance
2002	Kondaveeti Simhasanam		
2002	Police No. 1		
2003	Basti Mein Sawal		
2005	Sravanamasam		
2008	Aapada Mokkula Vaadu		Item number
2010	Leader		Item number
2012	Julai		Item number
2013	Madhumati	Madhumati	Lead Role
2024	Prathinidhi 2	Udayabhanu	
2025	Tribanadhari Barbarik	Vakili Padma	

== Television ==
=== As Host ===
- Horlicks Hrudayanjali for ETV Telugu
- Dance-2000 for ETV Telugu
- Challenge-2001 for ETV Telugu
- Once More Please for Gemini TV
- Sahasam Cheyara Dimbaka for Gemini TV
- Janavule Nerajanavule for Gemini TV
- Nuvvu Nenu for Gemini TV
- Lux Dream Girl for Gemini TV
- Chaangure Bangaru Lady for Gemini TV
- Lucky Lakshmi for Gemini TV
- Dancing stars for Gemini TV
- Gold Rush (season 1) for Zee Telugu
- Teenmaar for Zee Telugu
- Magadheera for Zee Telugu
- Rela Re Rela for MAA TV
- Rangam (season 1&2) for MAA TV
- Dhee (1 to 6 seasons) for ETV Telugu
- Pillalu Pidugulu for Gemini TV
- Antahpuram for Gemini TV
- Neethone Dance for Star Maa
- Kalyana Lakshmi for Gemini TV
- Gang leader for ETV Plus
- Bomma Borusaa for Gemini TV (present)
- D/o Prasad Rao: Kanabadutaledu

=== As Judge ===
- Adhurs for ETV Telugu
- Thadakha for ETV Telugu
- Joolakataka for Gemini TV
- DHEE for ETV Telugu
