= Thenkachi Ko. Swaminathan =

Indian radio personality

Thenkatchi Ko Swaminathan
- Born: 1946; Thenkatchiperumalnatham, Trichinopoly District, Madras Province, British India (now Ariyalur district, Tamil Nadu, India)
- Died: 16 September 2009 (aged 63); Chennai, Tamil Nadu, India
- Occupation(s): Spiritual Guru, Writer, Researcher-Orator
- Spouse: Mahalakshmi
- Children: Senthamizhselvi

Thenkatchi Ko Ayya. Swaminathan (1946 – 16 September 2009) was a Tamil orator, television personality and author of various Tamil books. He had served as deputy director of All India Radio, Chennai.

== Early life ==
Swaminathan was born in Thenkatchiperumalnatham, a small village in present-day Ariyalur district, Tamil Nadu to Tamil parents. He graduated in agriculture from the Tamil Nadu Agricultural University, Coimbatore.

== Career ==
He started his career in a government office as Agricultural Extension Officer. He resigned his job to do farming in his agricultural lands. Seven years later in 1977 he joined All India Radio, to make speeches on agricultural topics.

He started his oration in Pannai Illam (Farm House) which was an instant hit with the farmers. Through this programme, with his scientific knowledge on agriculture he taught farmers modern agricultural techniques, of course using his inimitable easy style to relate to farmers.

=== 1988 – 2002 Indru oru thagaval ===
Millions of people across Tamil Nadu woke up to his voice every morning for several years. The five-minute programme, presented in simple colloquial Tamil, the common man could relate to and punctuated by anecdotes meant to make you smile and ponder, was broadcast without a break from 1988 until his retirement in 2002. Many still remember him for his popular daily programme "Indru oru Thagaval" (i.e. Message for the day) on All India Radio (AIR).

The collection of his Indru Oru Thagaval talk show was later published as books in 23 volumes by Chennai Kalaivaani Puthakalayam Tamil book publishers. First volume was published in May, 1990. Swaminathan gave the entire remuneration he got through these books to charities. Now the all collections of "Indru Oru Thagaval" messages in the same name (four volumes separately ie., "Indru Oru Thagaval 1-4) by Chennai Geetham & Muthunadu Publications.

=== 2002 – 2009 Indha Naal Iniya Naal ===
Later when television became popular, on Sun TV, a popular Tamil-language channel, he gave a similar program in the morning called Indha Naal Iniya Naal (i.e. This day, a sweet day). He delivered messages that provoked one to reflect, think and make personal mends to oneself.

All India Radio's station director K. Srinivasaraghavan said "Swaminathan's communication skills, use of simple language and a subtle sense of humour led to his being given the opportunity to present 'Indru oru Thagaval' (i.e. Today One Message)". Former station director of AIR, Chennai, G Selvam, said "Swaminathan left his mark in writing scripts and plays, in discussions, poetry sessions, children's programme and short stories."

His biography "Thenkachi - Kathai Rajavin Kathai" was written by familiar Journalist and writer Komal Anbarasan.

=== Film appearance ===
Swaminathan appeared in a small role as a judge in Kaadhale Nimmadhi (1998) and also as assistant editor of Vaigarai magazine in the film Ilakkanam (2006).

== Books ==
- Kalkandu Katturaigal
- Ninaithaal Nimmathi
- Thenkatchiyaarin Sinthanai Virunthu
- Sirragai Virippom
- Thagaval Kelungal
- Vazkaiyai Kondaduvom
- Ellorukkum Annai
- Anubavangal Arthamullavai
- Manasukkul Velicham
- Thenkachiyin 100 Suvaiyana Thagavalkal

== Death ==
Swaminathan died in Chennai on 16 September 2009 after a heart attack at the age of 63. He is survived by his wife and a daughter.
