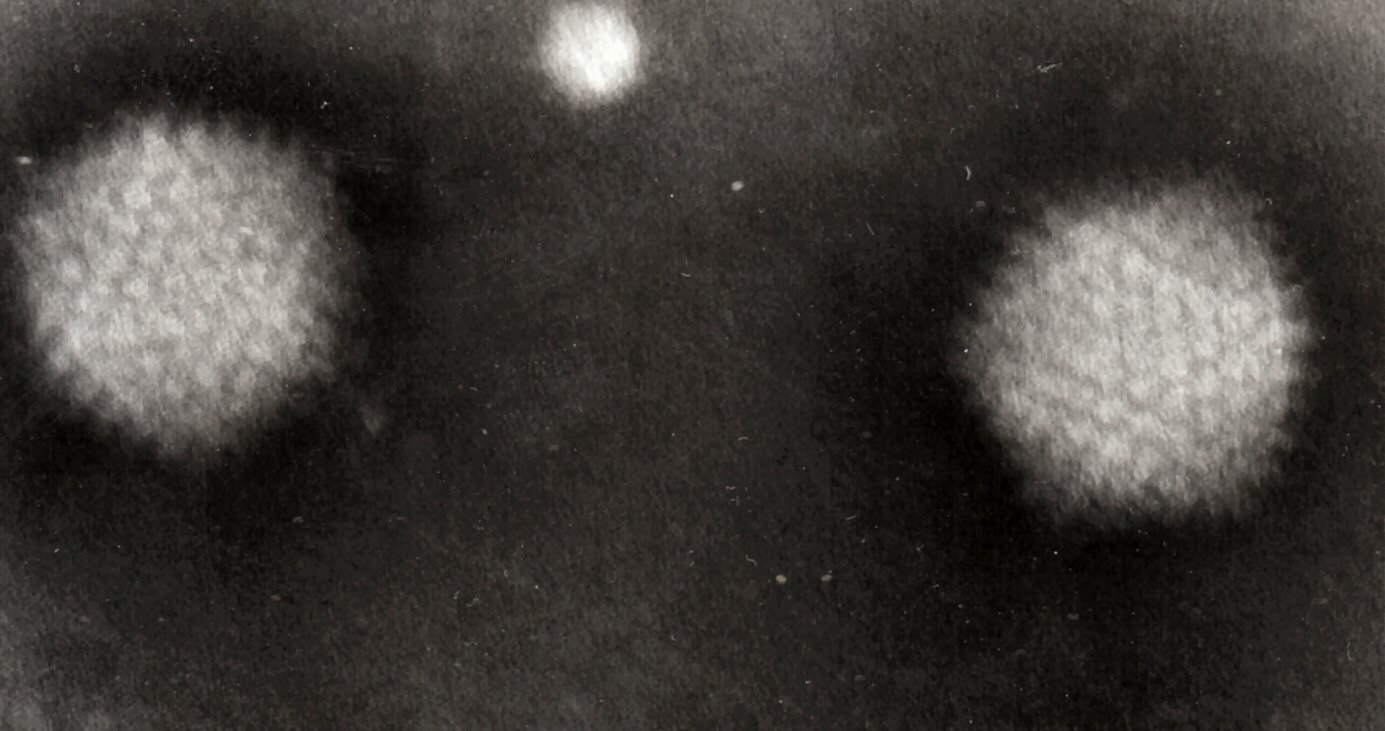
- Agamid adenovirus

Virus classification
- Missing taxonomy template (fix): Barthadenovirus

= Barthadenovirus =

Genus of viruses

Barthadenovirus is a genus of viruses, in the family Adenoviridae. Vertebrates serve as natural hosts. There are 21 species in this genus. From 2002 to 2024, the genus was named Atadenovirus.

== Taxonomy ==
The genus contains the following species, listed by scientific name and followed by the exemplar virus of the species:

- Barthadenovirus amazonae, Psittacine adenovirus 3
- Barthadenovirus bosquartum, Bovine adenovirus 4
- Barthadenovirus bosseptimum, Bovine adenovirus 7
- Barthadenovirus bossextum, Bovine adenovirus 6
- Barthadenovirus caerulei, Psittacine adenovirus 11
- Barthadenovirus cervi, Deer adenovirus 1, also called Odocoileus adenovirus 1
- Barthadenovirus draconis, Bearded dragon adenovirus 1
- Barthadenovirus galloanserae, Duck adenovirus 1
- Barthadenovirus gerygones, Grey warbler adenovirus 1
- Barthadenovirus inornati, Yellow-browed warbler adenovirus 1
- Barthadenovirus lacertae, Lizard adenovirus 2
- Barthadenovirus macropodidae, Agile wallaby adenovirus 1
- Barthadenovirus mellis, Eastern spinebill adenovirus 1, also called Passerine adenovirus 1
- Barthadenovirus ovis, Ovine adenovirus 7
- Barthadenovirus schwarzi, Radde's warbler adenovirus 1
- Barthadenovirus serpentis, Snake adenovirus 1
- Barthadenovirus sternae, Common tern adenovirus 1, also called Tern atadenovirus 1
- Barthadenovirus varani, Varanus adenovirus 37597
- Barthadenovirus vulpeculae, Possum adenovirus 1
- Barthadenovirus zootherae, Scaly thrush adenovirus 1
- Barthadenovirus zootocae, Viviparous lizard adenovirus 1, also called Adenovirus zootoca35082

== Structure ==
Viruses in Barthadenovirus are non-enveloped, with icosahedral geometries, and T=25 symmetry. The diameter is around 90 nm. Genomes are linear and non-segmented, around 30kb in length. The genome codes for 30 proteins.

Genus	Structure	Symmetry	Capsid	Genomic arrangement	Genomic segmentation
Barthadenovirus	Polyhedral	Pseudo T=25	Non-enveloped	Linear	Monopartite

== Life cycle ==
Viral replication is nuclear. Entry into the host cell is achieved by attachment of the viral fiber glycoproteins to host receptors, which mediates endocytosis. Replication follows the DNA strand displacement model. DNA-templated transcription, with some alternative splicing mechanism is the method of transcription. The virus exits the host cell by nuclear envelope breakdown, viroporins, and lysis. Vertebrates serve as the natural host.

Genus	Host details	Tissue tropism	Entry details	Release details	Replication site	Assembly site	Transmission
Barthadenovirus	Vertebrates	None	Glycoprotiens	Lysis	Nucleus	Nucleus	Unknown
