= Ilakkanam =

- Poster
- Directed by: Chandraseyan
- Written by: Chandraseyan
- Produced by: M. C. Shanmugam
- Starring: Vishnupriyan; Uma
- Cinematography: K. V. Mani
- Edited by: K. Thanigachalam
- Music by: Bhavatharini
- Production company: Nanneri Padaippagam
- Release date: 22 December 2006
- Running time: 135 minutes
- Country: India
- Language: Tamil

Ilakkanam (transl. Grammar) is a 2006 Indian Tamil language drama film directed by Chandraseyan, making his directorial debut. The film stars newcomer Vishnupriyan and Uma, with Vinu Chakravarthy, Bala Singh, Kadhal Sukumar, Chitti Babu, Sathyapriya, Anjali Devi, Sabitha Anand, Rohini and Rajashree playing supporting roles. The film, produced by M. C. Shanmugam, was released on 22 December 2006. The film won the Tamil Nadu State Film Award Special Prize for Best Film.

== Plot ==
In August 2005, Thamizharasan (Vishnupriyan) remembers his past.

In the past, Thamizharasan was an idealist and respectful young man who was fond of literature and he wanted to change society for the better. He left his village Mugaiyur (near Viluppuram) and joined a magazine named Vaigarai in Chennai as a journalist. He was well liked by his colleagues and impressed by his work, his superiors promoted him as an assistant editor for managing the magazine as it was to become a fortnightly. Meanwhile, Thamizharasan's family found him a bride: Kayalvizhi (Uma). For his work, Thamizharasan had to write an article about a gang leader turned politician Manikkam who was also Thamizharasan's old friend. Thamizharasan met him and asked him to stop his illegal activities but Manikkam refused. One day, he was arrested for misbehaving with a woman at the bus stand. Kayalvizhi witnessed the whole scene and started to hate Thamizharasan. It was Manikkam's plan to teach him a lesson and Thamizharasan was then released by the police. Despite this, her family arranged her wedding with Thamizharasan. After the marriage, Kayalvizhi realized that Thamizharasan was a perfect gentleman. The couple had a girl and lived happily. During an outing with his family, a riot broke out following the death of a politician. Kayalvizhi was hit by a stone and rushed to the hospital where she entered the coma stage. Thereafter, she was declared brain death by doctors. In a twist of fate, the wife of the person who threw the stone which hit Kayalvizhi was in the hospital awaiting a heart transplant and Thamizharasan agreed to donate his wife's heart.

Thamizharasan then raised his daughter Panimalar on his own and she is now a district collector.

== Cast ==
- Vishnupriyan as Thamizharasan
- Uma as Kayalvizhi
- Vinu Chakravarthy as Murugavel
- Bala Singh as Kayalvizhi's father
- Kadhal Sukumar as Elango
- Chitti Babu as Kumaresan
- Sathyapriya as Maragadam, Thamizharasan's mother
- Anjali Devi as Lakshmi, Kayalvizhi's mother
- Sabitha Anand as Murugavel's wife
- Rohini as Susi
- Rajashree as Malliga, Thamizharasan's sister
- Tharika as Sumathi, Kayalvizhi's sister
- Revathi Priya as Kavi, Thamizharasan's niece
- Divya Nagesh as Panimalar
- M. C. Shanmugam as Thamizharasan's father
- Usha Elizabeth as Elango's wife
- Thadi Balaji as Ezhil
- Vijay Anand as Manimaran
- Kovai Babu as Chezhian
- Nellai Siva as House broker
- Birla Bose as Thamizharasan's brother
- S. Rajasekar
- Vijay Krishnaraj as Doctor
- Crane Manohar as Arumugam
- Tirupur Ramasamy
- Mumtaj Pakoda Kadhar
- Bonda Mani as Peon
- Kaduvetti Guru as Gunasekaran, Thamizharasan's uncle
- Nedumaran as Himself
- Suba Veerapandian as Himself, chief editor of Vaigarai magazine
- Thenkachi Ko. Swaminathan as Himself, assistant editor of Vaigarai magazine
- S. Ramadoss as Himself

== Production ==
Newcomer Vishnupriyan, credited as Ram, signed to play the hero in Ilakkanam opposite Uma. Before the release of the film, the film producer M. C. Shanmugam and director Chandraseyan had organised a special screening for the then Chief Minister of Tamil Nadu M. Karunanidhi. It was reported that he had enjoyed the film and was also impressed with the music score of Bhavatharini.

== Soundtrack ==
The soundtrack was composed by Bhavatharini, with lyrics written by Subramania Bharati, Bharathidasan, Piraisoodan, Pa. Vijay and Chandraseyan.

Song	Singer(s)
"Masilla Maniye"	Sudha Ragunathan, Rajalakshmi, Subiksha, Shweta Mohan
"Oorukku Nallathu"	Bhavatharini
"Puthiyathoor Ullagam"	P. Unnikrishnan, Vasu, Vijay Murali, Bhavatharini
"Thangiduma"	Vijay Yesudas
"Thiruve Ninai"	Madhu Balakrishnan
"Unnakke En Aaviyum"	Karthik, Shalini

== Reception ==
Malathi Rangarajan of The Hindu praised the performance of the actors and said, "Nothing out of the world, but a decent fare definitely". Malini Mannath of Chennai Online wrote "The debutant director seems to have gone to great lengths in pursuit of this, the characters and incidents a lesson in human bonding and values, and having pride in one's language. But as a piece of film-making, both the scripting and the style of presentation could surely have done with more finesse, and in a way that would be appealing to the audiences".
