= K. Ramasamy (scientist) =

Indian academic

Vice Chancellor, Tamil Nadu Agricultural University
- In office 2012–2018
- Chancellor: Governor of Tamil Nadu

Vice Chancellor, Karpagam University
- In office 2010–2012
- Chancellor: R. Vasanthakumar
- Succeeded by: Subramanian

Dean, School of Biotechnology SRM Institute of Science and Technology
- In office 2005–2010
- Chancellor: T. R. Paarivendhar

Personal details
- Born: 1 May 1948 (age 78) Nilaiyoor, Aranthangi
- Occupation: Educationalist, scientist

K. Ramasamy (Tamil: கு. இராமசாமி; born 1 May 1948) is the former Vice Chancellor of Tamil Nadu Agricultural University, located in Coimbatore, Tamil Nadu, India, and was also the Member of State Planning Commission (agriculture and irrigation) of Tamil Nadu. He has served as Member in National Policy planning of Agriculture Biotechnology, Ferti-irrigation and Biogas Development.

== Educational background ==
Ramasamy studied secondary education in Veludaiyar High School, Tiruvarur and Board High School, Aranthangi. He received his Bachelors and Masters from Annamalai University. He later pursued his Master of Science (M.S) in Fermentation Technology at Catholic University of Leuven, Belgium. He went on to pursue his PhD research in the field of Industrial Microbiology. His continued his post-doctoral research specializing in Electron Microscope at Catholic University of Leuven and later in Gene Cloning at Michigan State University.

== Academic career ==
Ramasamy was appointed as the 11th Vice Chancellor of TNAU by the Governor of Tamil Nadu. His vice-chancellorship was extended for another three-year term by the K Rosaiah, Governor of Tamil Nadu. He was formerly the Vice Chancellor of Karpagam University, Coimbatore and Dean School of Biosciences and Bioengineering at SRM Institute of Science and Technology. Prior to these positions, he also served as the Director of Centre for Plant Molecular Biology and Biotechnology at Tamil Nadu Agricultural University

He joined Tamil Nadu Agricultural University in 1970 and served in various departments of the university - Soil Science, Plant Pathology, Microbiology, Bio-Energy, Environmental Science and Biotechnology for over 36 years. He was the director of Center for Plant Molecular Biology and Biotechnology. During this tenure, he played key role in establishing many graduate programs such as Bioenergy, Environmental Science, Environmental Biotechnology, Microbial Technology, and Biochemical Technology in Universities of Tamil Nadu, Kerala, Goa and Maharashtra. He has worked in Private and Public Agricultural Institutions at the Managerial Cadre.

He has contributed as National Syllabus Setter and Examiner for University Grants Commission (UGC), Indian Council of Agricultural Research (ICAR) and Council of Scientific and Industrial Research (CSIR).

Ramasamy is the member of Board of ICAR, NAAS University Ranking Committee ICAR Accreditation Committee, ICAR Academic Infrastructure Committee, Virtual Class Rooms for Higher Agricultural Education across NARES committee and, Online Learning System (including MOOC) committee at the National level.
