= Idhu Namma Aalu (1988 film) =

- Theatrical release poster
- Directed by: Balakumaran
- Written by: K. Bhagyaraj
- Produced by: K. Gopinath
- Starring: K. Bhagyaraj; Shobana
- Cinematography: K. Rajpreet
- Edited by: A. P. Manivannan
- Music by: K. Bhagyaraj
- Production company: Bhagavathi Creations
- Distributed by: Sharanya Cine Combines
- Release date: 1 August 1988
- Running time: 157 minutes
- Country: India
- Language: Tamil

Idhu Namma Aalu (lit. 'He is our man'; contextual: He is from our caste) is a 1988 Indian Tamil-language comedy film which is the directorial debut of Balakumaran and was written by K. Bhagyaraj who also composed the music and stars in it. The film was released on 1 August 1988. It was remade in Telugu as Adirindi Alludu (1996), and twice in Kannada as Aliya Alla Magala Ganda (1997) and Ravi Shastri (2006).

== Plot ==
Gopalsamy, a poor graduate of Bachelor of Arts, travels to Madras to financially provide for his mother's eye surgery. Being unable to meet both ends meet, he encounters a Brahmin priest who employs young men to sell snacks by forging their identity in order to deceive his customers. The priest obliges Gopal to act like a Hindu from the Brahmin caste and sell food in the neighbouring agraharam. Being a non-Brahmin from a backward caste, Gopal finds it morally reprehensible to wear the sacred thread. Being forced in the circumstances to put on the Brahman identity, he sets off to perform Ganapati homam with three other priests.

Mylapore Srinivasa Sastri is an orthodox Brahmin priest who will preserve his Brahmin regulations mentioned in the Vedas at any cost, but also helps the needy. Though he helps low caste people, he cannot tolerate them even touching his clothes. Gopal comes to Srinivasa Sastri's home for the homam and meets Srinivasa's young daughter Banu. Srinivasa Sastri figures out that Gopal does not know any sacred chants but understands that Gopal is an educated person who is looking for a job. He arranges a job as a government employed clerk for Gopal in a temple and lets him stay in his out-house as paying guest. Gopal's innocence & courage attracts Banu and she falls head over heels for him. Gopal keeps away from her to not encourage a relationship, causing a fight. Srinivasa Sastri gives money for Gopal's mother's operation and Gopal is loyal to him. Banu's mother wants Gopal to marry her daughter, but Gopal falsely insists that he has a bride waiting for him. Banu finds that Gopal loves her. She kisses him in front of her parents, Srinivasa Sastri accepts their relationship and arranges for marriage. Gopal reveals that he is not a Brahmin, but Banu does not believe him and both marry in Brahmin's traditions. Gopal's parents come to marriage without their son's knowledge and they are shocked by the wedding. They reveal themselves to Srinivasa Sastri, and ask him to convey their blessings. On knowing the truth, he furiously tells Gopal to swear that he does not live as husband to his daughter, to which Gopal promises as a punishment.

Srinivasa Sastri is disappointed on his daughter's marriage. Gopal's parents seeks for apology for their son's act and requests him to unite Gopal and Banu, which Sastri does not accept. Gopal is strong to keep up the promise given to his father-in-law and declines to live as husband and wife. Gopal also declines to return to his native as requested by his parents, and promises to teach a lesson to the egoistic Srinivasa. Banu goes to meet her husband which angers Sastri and he tells her to get out of his house. Banu goes back to Gopal and Gopal does not let her enter his home. Since Srinivasa had helped many people in Gopal's area, they let her rent the new hut opposite to Gopal and hence Banu starts to live opposite to his home. She tries to provoke Gopal and vainly tries to seduce him, but Gopal does not co-operate. Gopal attempts heavily to make Sastri accept non-Brahmins. Gopal's father gets frustrated on the marriage not being consummated due to the promise and compels Gopal to marry again as he wanted to see grand children. Banu seeks lawful permission from her father to permit second marriage of her husband or accept him as his son-in-law and take back the promise. Sastri is now in dilemma whether to protect his orthodox or to protect his daughter's life. His staunch orthodox makes him sign the legal document permitting Gopal's second marriage. Gopal does not want to marry again as he is the reason for Banu being a virgin. The compulsion of his parents finally make him break the promise and he had sex with Banu.

Srinivasa Sastri understands that he has spoiled his daughter's life and decides to kill himself by setting fire so that his daughter's life will be happy, but Gopal saves him. Gopal reveals that he broke the promise for Banu's sake and they have united. Srinivasa Sastri realises his mistake which he had done in the name of orthodox and accepts Gopal as his son-in-law.

== Cast ==
- K. Bhagyaraj as Gopal
- Shobana as Banu
- J. V. Somayajulu as Srinivasa Sastri
- Manorama as Gopal's Mother
- Kumarimuthu as Gopal's Father
- Dubbing Janaki as Banu's mother
- Kalaignanam as Krishna Iyer
- Balakumaran as Hotel Cashier
- Idichapuli Selvaraj
- Kovai Senthil
- Suryakanth

== Production ==
The film was launched in 1986 with Sri Bhagavathi creations being the original producer while Gangai Amaran and Mouli being the film's initial composer and director. The filming began on Ooty with the filming of song "Medhuva Medhuva Thoda" composed by Amaran.

== Soundtrack ==
The music was composed by Bhagyaraj. For the Telugu dubbed version Nenu Meevadine, lyrics were written by Rajasri.

Tamil

Song	Singers	Lyrics	Length
"Ammadi Idhu Thaan Kadhala"	S. P. Balasubrahmanyam, K. S. Chithra	Pulamaipithan	05:16
"Kamadevan Aalayam"	S. P. Balasubrahmanyam, S. Janaki	Pulamaipithan	04:22
"Kannurangu Ponmayile"	K. J. Yesudas	Muthulingam	04:02
"Naan Aalana Thamarai"	S. Janaki	Vaali	03:55
"Pachai Mala Sami Onnu"	K. Bhagyaraj	Pulamaipithan	04:47
"Sangeetham Paada"	S. P. Balasubrahmanyam, Vani Jairam	Vaali	04:46
"Margazhi masathu"	S. P. Balasubrahmanyam, K. S. Chithra	Vaali	04:46

Telugu

Song	Singers	Length
"Premante"	S. P. Balasubrahmanyam, K. S. Chithra, S. P. Sailaja	05:14
"Idhi Sandhela Ratri"	S. P. Sailaja	04:00
"Panakala Swamy"	S. P. Balasubrahmanyam	04:15
"Sangeetham"	S. P. Balasubrahmanyam, Vani Jairam	06:16
"Pramadevuni"	S. P. Balasubrahmanyam, S. P. Sailaja	04:29

== Release and reception ==
Idhu Namma Aalu was released on 1 August 1988, and distributed by Sharanya Cine Combines. The Indian Express wrote, "The script, spiced with humour and fortified by Bhagyaraj's lighthearted touches as an actor, and the absence of malice in his general outlook, manages to give the film safe passage". The film won the Tamil Nadu State Film Award Special Prize.
