= Shree Jagannath Heritage Corridor, Puri =

Shree Mandir Parikrama, Puri
- Location in Odisha Shree Jagannath Heritage Corridor, Puri (India)

Religion
- Affiliation: Hinduism
- District: Puri
- Governing body: Shree Jagannath Temple Administration, Puri, Shree Jagannath Temple Managing Committee, Puri

Location
- Location: Puri
- State: Odisha
- Country: India
- Coordinates: 19°48′17″N 85°49′6″E

Architecture
- Completed: 17 January 2024; 2 years ago
- Elevation: 65 m (213 ft)

Website
- Official website

The Shree Mandir Parikrama is a 75 metre-long heritage corridor around the Jagannath Temple in Puri, Odisha, India. It has been built to provide expansive and unobstructed corridors around the Meghanad Pacheri, for giving an opportunity to devotees and pilgrims to have better darshan with the temple, Nila Chakra and Meghanad Pacheri, similar to the Kashi Vishwanath Corridor in the Kashi Vishwanath Temple. The project also provides ample facilities and amenities for pilgrims and visitors to give them a hassle-free and memorable experience, and for strengthening the safety and security of the temple and the devotees. It has been constructed at a cost of ₹3,600 crore (US$370 million), and is the core part of the ongoing plan of developing Puri into a world heritage city, to cater to the growing number of footfalls of devotees and visitors. Construction began in November 2021, and was inaugurated by Chief Minister Naveen Patnaik on 17 January 2024.

== History ==
The project was first conceptualized by the Government of Odisha in 2016, after hearing a query from the date cabinet officials about developing a 'heritage corridor' as part of 'Puri Heritage Corridor Project' plan, to modernise the space around the 12th century-temple complex and provide adequate facilities and amenities to pilgrims and visitors for a better and smoother experience. Another reason stated in favour of the project was that it would be crucial for the temple's future, as unlike the other three Dhams, Puri did not have a "Parikrama Marg", or a path for circumambulation in a heritage corridor, similar to the Kashi Vishwanath Corridor of the Kashi Vishwanath Temple in Varanasi. Hence, in 2019, the project was renamed as Shree Mandir Parikrama Project (SMPP), or Shree Jagannath Heritage Corridor (SJHC), to be executed for the beautification of the perimeter of the Jagannath temple.

It covers an area of 15.64 acres (6.32 ha), and has been built at an initial cost of ₹943 crore (US$98 million), which later decreased to ₹800 crore (US$83 million). Apart from the temple project, the state government is spending another ₹3,300 crore (US$340 million), which later increased to ₹4,224 crore (US$440 million), for transforming Puri's heritage and infrastructure, under the Augmentation of Basic Amenities and Development of Heritage and Architecture (ABADHA) scheme. Then, land acquisition for the project began in November 2019, where over 600 people living around the temple gave up 15.64 acres, critical for development of the security zone. It was cleared after a three-bench judgement of the Supreme Court headed by the then Justice of the Court, Arun Kumar Mishra, in November 2019, who suggested that a 75-metre radius around the temple be cleared of all structures for safety, security and improvement of the temple premises. A few months before, between August and September 2019, the Puri district administration had cleared the centuries-old Embar Matha and its Raghunandan Library, along with other buildings deemed as illegal encroachments.

After completion of the land acquisition, Chief Minister Naveen Patnaik and the incumbent King of the Gajapati Empire and of Puri, as well as the adhyasevak, or the chief servitor of the Jagannath temple, Dibyasingha Deba, laid the foundation stone of the project in November 2021 for the development of the area, within the 75-metre corridor of the boundary wall of the Jagannath temple, to transform it into a pilgrim centre, similar to the Kashi Vishwanath Corridor in the Kashi Vishwanath Temple of Varanasi. The project was supposed to begin construction in January 2021, but got delayed due to the COVID-19 pandemic, as well as the issuance of draft by-laws by the National Monuments Authority (NMA) for the temple in the same month, that prohibited any construction work within a 100-metre periphery of the temple, also prohibiting construction within another 200 metres, without the NMA giving nod. However, the by-laws were withdrawn following a request from the Chief Minister, Naveen Patnaik. Further roadblocks came in February 2022, when the Archeological Survey of India (ASI) in Puri asked the state government to stop excavating, as it would be a violation of the Ancient Monuments and Archaeological Sites and Remains (AMASR) Act, 1958.

As the case landed in the High Court of Odisha, the ASI, in an affidavit, submitted that the archaeological remains of the heritage site may have been destroyed during the excavation, as no heritage impact assessment studies were done before the digging. However, all roadblocks related to this were cleared in September 2022, after the NMA granted a No-Objection Certificate (NOC) for the construction of the reception centre–the most important component of the project, just outside the prohibited zone. In June 2022, the Supreme Court dismissed two Public Interest Litigations (PILs) that challenged the renovation project, calling it "frivolous litigations". The project also became a subject of political controversy, claiming that the ruling Biju Janata Dal (BJD) government in Odisha would get space for itself to win seats in the upcoming 2024 Lok Sabha elections, instead of going through the project and benefitting the people of Puri.

Construction began soon after laying down the foundation stone, and witnessed a few slowdowns due to the objections mentioned above. It continued, and the date for the corridor's inauguration was set for January 2024 in November 2023. All structural works were completed by the first week of January 2024, after an inspection by state government officials was conducted on 6 January 2024. The project was inaugurated and opened to the public by Chief Minister Naveen Patnaik and King Dibyasingha Deba on 17 January 2024.

== Description ==
The 75 metre-long corridor of the SJHC surrounding the Meghanad Pacheri is broadly divided into nine zones on the northern, southern and western side. These include:

- Green Buffer Zone: This is located adjacent to the Meghanad Pacheri. It is 7 metres long, out of which it consists of a 2-metre-long green area surrounding the Meghanad Pacheri for access by staff and for maintenance purposes. The remaining 5-metre is a 1 feet-high terraced landscape garden.
- Antar Pradakshina: It is a 10 metre-long inner space for ceremonial procession of deities, that is used year-round by the general public for pradakshina or parikrama of the Shree Mandira or the temple complex.
- Bahya Pradakshina: Covered by trees on either side, it covers 8 metres, and acts as a shaded pathway for visitors and pilgrims.
- Landscape Zone: These gardens cover 14 metres in one zone, and have been designed through meticulous research of local arboriculture practices. Local varieties of trees and shrubs used in Jagannath culture have been planted here.
- Public Convenience Zone: Along with plantation of tall trees and shrubs, this 10 metre-long zone has many facilities, such as restrooms, drinking water fountains, information-cum-donation kiosks, and shelter pavilions for shade and rest.
- Service lane: It is 4.5 metres long, and is used for access by service vehicles and maintenance of the corridor.
- Dedicated shuttle-cum-emergency lane: This 4.5 metre-long is for emergency services and disaster management.
- Mixed traffic lane: It is 7.5 metres long, and aids in the movement of vehicles around the heritage corridor to ensure access to properties surrounding the outer access road, as well as the lanes from the neighbouring Shahis meeting this outer access road.
- Shaded footpath: This 7 metre-wide corridor with trees is designed adjacent to the mixed traffic lane for a smoother pedestrian flow around the corridor and neighbouring areas for people to commute. This is equipped with parking bays for Sevaks and temple officials. It has provisions for dustbins, street furniture, drinking water fountains, etc.

The eastern plaza of the heritage corridor is a large open space, as many festivals of the temple, including the Ratha Yatra, starts from here. This allows large congregation of devotees to take place in a safe and secure environment.

== Facilities and Amenities ==
The heritage corridor has facilities and amenities intended to provide visitors and pilgrims a comfortable experience. The list includes:

- Main Cloak Room: It is used by pilgrims and visitors for depositing their baggage, shoes and mobile phones before queueing up for entering to the temple complex. This is located at the north-east corner of the temple, with an area of over 500 m^{2} (5,400 sq ft).
- Mini Cloak Rooms: These two rooms are located near the south and west gates of the temple, with an area assigned for each as 26.7 m^{2} (287 sq ft). These rooms are for visitors to deposit their mobile phones and shoes, for convenience of visitors and temple workers, who mainly use these gates for movement.
- Information-cum-Donation Kiosks: These are located in the north, south and west sides of the corridor, all of which cover an area of 26.7 m^{2} (287 sq ft), for facilitating the devotees with the required information about the temple, facilities, rituals, etc. The kiosks also has provision for accepting donations from the devotees and pilgrims for the temple.
- Shree Jagannatha Reception Centre (SJRC): In order to meet the essential requirements of the visitors to the temple and the heritage corridor, a queue management facility with a capacity of 6,000 persons, along with security checking, baggage screening, a cloak room for keeping belongings of up to four thousand families, drinking water and washroom facilities, facilities for washing hands and feet, and souvenirs including book shops have been provided in this centre, spread over an area of 7,917 m^{2} (85,220 sq ft). This is built over half an acre land available next to heritage corridor on the south-east side.
- Shree Jagannatha Temple Administration (SJTA) Office: The dignitaries and guests are received and explained about the temple at the renovated office. Further, it provides adequate arrangements for dignitaries and guests to witness the Ratha Yatra of the Lords. The safety and security arrangements have accordingly been made in this office.
- Shelter Pavilions: These are used as shaded resting points for pilgrims around the plaza, and are located strategically in the west side, where there are two pavilions, and in the south side, where there are three pavilions. Each shelter pavilion has been built over an area of 13 m^{2} (140 sq ft).
- Washrooms: There are two washrooms consisting of six areas each for males and females. The two washrooms cover an area of 45 m^{2} (480 sq ft), and are located in the north, south and west sides of the corridor.
- Sevayat Washrooms: There is one washroom each for the sevayats, or workers, and kitchen staff of the temple. These are built over an area of 45 m^{2} (480 sq ft), and are located in the north and south sides of the corridor.
- Police Service Centre: It is used by the police personnel deployed for ensuring safety and security for the temple and the devotees visiting the temple. It is located in the west side of the corridor, over an area of 26.7 m^{2} (287 sq ft).
- ATM Kiosk: It is located in the north side of the corridor, to ensure that the devotees get access to their bank account whenever required.
- Electrical Room: A centrally controlled state-of-the-art electrical room with advanced technology is located on the western side of the plaza, for efficient and smart management of electricity in and around temple complex. This houses all electrical equipment and power backup facilities required for the temple complex and the plaza area. It covers an area of 130 m^{2} (1,400 sq ft).
- First Aid Centre: A preliminary emergency medical facility for addressing health emergencies has been built for the temple workers, or Sevayats, and visitors. It covers an area of 26.7 m^{2} (287 sq ft).

== Matha Redevelopment ==
Efforts have been made to redevelop the matha temples existing within the 75 metre-long heritage corridor. These matha temples have been redeveloped by keeping in mind the Kalinga style of architecture in general, and specific traditions of the concerned matha. Further, this redevelopment has also been provided for the garbhagriha (sanctum sanctorum), the Jagamohana or Nata Mandapa and the Bhoga Mandapa.

== Security ==
An additional five-layer security arrangement, including 44 police platoons consisting of 30 police officers each, has been deployed around the temple complex and around the city as well, to enhance the security of the temple. The Indian Coast Guard and the Marine Police have also deployed to protect not only the temple, but also the city and its coast. Before inauguration of the project on 17 January 2024, a four-level security arrangement in the city was deployed to ensure smooth and hassle-free conduct of the inauguration ceremony. Around 100 supervisor officers, 250 sub-inspector and assistant sub- inspector rank officers, 80 platoons of police force and home guards were deployed. Apart from these, four bomb squads and canine squads were also be deployed. 135 CCTV cameras, equipped with face-reading technology, have been installed in the entire corridor and complex, to further advance the existing security arrangements in the temple.

== See also ==
- Jagannath Temple, Puri
- Historic sites in Odisha
- Jagannath
- Sevayat
- Archaeological Survey of India
- Kashi Vishwanath Temple
- Heritage Street Amritsar
- Shri Jagannath Temple Managing Committee
