= Ravi Shastri (film) =

- CD cover
- Directed by: M. S. Rajashekar; M. R. Raghavendra
- Based on: Idhu Namma Aalu (1988) by Balakumaran
- Produced by: Sandesh Nagaraj
- Starring: Ravichandran; Sneha
- Music by: Rajesh Ramanath
- Production company: Sandesh Combines
- Release date: 28 September 2006
- Country: India
- Language: Kannada

Ravi Shastri is a 2006 Indian Kannada-language romantic comedy film directed by M. S. Rajashekar and M. R. Raghavendra. It is a remake of the Tamil film Idhu Namma Aalu (1988) and stars Ravichandran and Sneha, in her Kannada cinema debut.

== Cast ==
- Ravichandran as Ravi Shastri
- Sneha as Bhanu
- Ananth Nag as Narayana Dixit
- Umashree
- Doddanna
- Karibasavaiah
- Vinaya Prasad
- Mandya Ramesh
- Bank Janardhan

== Production ==
The film completed shooting by mid-2006.

== Soundtrack ==
The music was composed by Rajesh Ramanath. Cricketer Ravi Shastri, who shared his name for this film, was to come for the audio launch but did not show up because he was not paid ₹5 lakh (equivalent to ₹16 lakh or US$17,000 in 2023).

Ravi Shastry

Soundtrack album by Rajesh Ramanath
- Released: 22 September 2006
- Genre: Feature film soundtrack
- Length: 35:56
- Language: Kannada
- Label: Lahari Music
- Producer: Rajesh Ramanath

Rajesh Ramanath chronology
Tirupathi (2006)	Ravi Shastry (2006)	Nali Naliyutha (2007)
External audio
- Ravi Shastry – Jukebox on YouTube

Track listing
No.	Title	Lyrics	Singer(s)	Length
1.	"Vesha Vesha"	V. Nagendra Prasad	Shankar Mahadevan	4:36
2.	"Mutthu Mutthu"	K. Ramnarayan	Udit Narayan, Sunidhi Chauhan	5:21
3.	"Gilli Gilli"	K. Ramnarayan	Kunal Ganjawala, Shreya Ghoshal	5:31
4.	"Hennige"	M. N. Vyasa Rao	Vijay Yesudas	5:02
5.	"Bandaithey"	K. Ramnarayan	Karthik, Malathi	5:21
6.	"Vesha Vesha (REMIX)"	V. Nagendra Prasad	Shankar Mahadevan	4:28
7.	"Sangeetha"	M. N. Vyasa Rao	Udit Narayan, K. S. Chithra	5:37
Total length:				35:56

== Reception ==
R. G. Vijayasarathy of Rediff.com opined that "Ravi Shashtry has a strong message to convey, but it unfortunately ends up being an ordinary film". A critic from Sify wrote that "This remake of K.Bhagyaraj classic Idhu Namma Aal from Tamil lacks the Kannada milieu and flavour. Director M.S.Rajashekhar could have made the film more racy and entertaining, which would have appealed to the masses".
