= Chitrangada (film) =

2017 Indian horror film

- Theatrical release poster
- Directed by: G. Ashok
- Produced by: Sridhar Gangapatnam
- Starring: Anjali
- Cinematography: Balreddy
- Edited by: Prawin Pudi
- Music by: V. Selvaganesh
- Distributed by: Sri Vignesh Karthik Cinema
- Release date: 10 March 2017
- Running time: 145 minutes
- Country: India
- Language: Telugu

Chitrangada is a 2017 Telugu-language horror film directed by G. Ashok and produced by Sridhar Gangapatnam. The film stars Anjali as the titular character, while Saptagiri, Arjan Bajwa, Sindhu Tolani, and Jayaprakash play supporting roles. The music was composed by V. Selvaganesh with cinematography by Balreddy and editing by Prawin Pudi. The film was released on 10 March 2017.

== Plot ==
Chitra, a college professor, loses her sanity after a series of traumatising experiences and is ostracised for her unpredictable behaviour. In the hope of finding a solution to her problems, she decides to go to the United States. There, she finds the place where she dreamt and starts investigating her dream and murder and discovers that Ravi Verma, who had died, was reborn as Chitra.

== Cast ==
- Anjali as Chitrangada
- Saptagiri as Punjuko Babban
- Arjan Bajwa as Ravi Varma
- Sindhu Tolani as Shalini Devi
  - Sreeleela as Young Shalini Devi
- Jayaprakash as Neelakanta, Chitrangada's psychologist
- Raja Ravindra
- Santosh as Rajesh
- Sudigali Sudheer as Kanakambaram
- Sandeep as US police officer
- Sakshi Gulati as Samyukta
- Swathi Deekshith as Suvarna
- Jyothi as Generator
- Raksha as Sarita
- Vasu Inturi
- Rajsekhar Aningi as Mantrikudu
- Lab Sharath
- Mahesh Achanta
- Chaams as Airport Passenger (uncredited)

== Soundtrack ==
The soundtrack was composed by V. Selvaganesh, collaborating with the director for the second time after Pilla Zamindar (2011).

No	Title	Singers	Duration
1	"Rasagulla"	S. Divya	3:51
2	"Dandangu"	Anjali	3:22
3	"Nuvve Nuvve"	M. M. Manasi, Yamini Taman	4:21
4	"Four Monkeys"	Swaminathan	2:33

== Reception ==
Sowmya Sruthi CH of The Times of India gave 2.5/5 stars and wrote, "For those who are fond of horror films though, Chitrangada might be a decent one-time watch. But if a horror isn’t even your thing, then you might as well spare yourself the trouble." Suhas Yellapantula of The New Indian Express gave 2/5 stars and wrote, "With a film that deals with reincarnation and spirits, there's hardly any argument that suggests they actually exist, while the execution leaves a lot to be desired."
