= Gaurie Pandit =

Indian model and actress (born 1982)

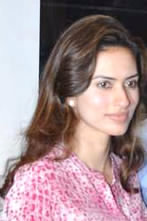
- Gowri Pandit in 2019
- Born: 12 September 1982; New Delhi, India
- Other name: Gauri Pandit
- Occupations: Actress, model
- Years active: 2005–2012
- Spouse: Nikhil Dwivedi (m. 2011)

Gaurie Pandit Dwivedi (née Pandit; born 1982) is an Indian model and actress primarily known for her work in Telugu cinema. She made her acting debut as the lead actress opposite Gopichand in the 2005 Telugu film Andhrudu. She later appeared in several Telugu films, as well as one Hindi and one Kannada film.

== Early life ==
Gowri was born in New Delhi and did her schooling from Springdales, Dhaula Kuan. She then completed her graduation from the Institute of integrated learning in management New Delhi.

From a young age, she aspired to be an actress and trained herself accordingly. At a very early stage, she started getting modeling assignments from some of the Top Brands and agencies of the country. Soon she went on to bag prestigious modeling assignments in Paris and Tokyo before stepping into the world of acting.

== Career ==
Gowri started her career as a model and appeared in many TV commercials of big brands. One of her most popular ads was the Hero Honda commercial along with Barun Sobti. She then went on to sign her first Telugu film Andhrudu which was a smash hit in the year 2005. Initially, she was not keen about acting in regional films and wanted a career in Bollywood.

She made her Bollywood debut with the 2007 film It's Breaking News. Her next release was multi-starrer Telugu romantic drama film Kasko (2009) directed by G. Nageswara Reddy alongside Vaibhav Reddy and Shweta Basu Prasad. She then starred in films like director G. Ashok’s debut Telugu film Aakasa Ramanna (2010). In the same year, she did her first Kannada movie Jayahe. In the following years, she starred in Telugu films like Nithya Pellikoduku (2011), Rajendra (2011) and Housefull (2012).

== Personal life ==
In 2011 she tied the knot with actor Nikhil Dwivedi who then also turned producer and produced Hindi films such as Veere Di Wedding in 2018 and Dabangg 3 with Salman Khan in 2019. The couple has a son, Shivaan.

== Filmography ==
Year	Title	Role	Language	Notes
2005	Andhrudu	Archana	Telugu	
2007	It's Breaking News	Gauri Pandit	Hindi	
2009	Kasko	Deepika	Telugu	
2010	Aakasa Ramanna	Isha	Telugu	
2010	Jayahe		Kannada	
2011	Nithya Pellikoduku	Aishwarya	Telugu	
2011	Rajendra		Telugu	
2012	Housefull	Tara	Telugu	
