= Salim Baig =

Indian actor

- Born: Mohammed Salim Baig
- Other name: Salim Panda
- Occupation: Actor
- Years active: 2004–present

Salim Baig is an Indian actor who has appeared in Telugu and Tamil language films. He is best known for his collaborations with director Gautham Vasudev Menon, having notably appeared as the antagonist in the police dramas Gharshana (2004) and Vettaiyaadu Vilaiyaadu (2006). The success of the films prompted several filmmakers to cast him in similar negative roles in the late 2000s.

== Career ==
Salim Baig was born and brought up in Mumbai and began his career in the entertainment industry as a model and then as a theatre artiste. Soon after competing in the Mr. Junior Mumbai competition, he received a call from director Teja who subsequently cast him in the Telugu action film, Jai (2004). The film's cinematographer Ravi Varman introduced him to director Gautham Vasudev Menon, who gave Salim his acting breakthrough, by casting him as a notorious gangster seeking revenge in the police drama Gharshana (2004). The success of the film prompted him to use his character name of "Panda" as a suffix to his stage name. About his performance, a critic from Indiaglitz.com wrote "newcomer Saleem Baig, despite a poor voice (dubbed), as the cold-blooded, revenge-seeking Panda is first rate" and that "he never misses a trick in the book and triumphs in this significant role for him". The opportunity allowed him to work on more big budget Telugu films such as Chiranjeevi's Andarivaadu (2005), Jagapati (2005) and Andhrudu (2005) during the following year. Menon then cast him again in his first Tamil film, the police drama Vettaiyaadu Vilaiyaadu (2006) which had Kamal Haasan in the lead role, Alongside Daniel Balaji, Salim portrayed a homosexual medical student who turns into a psycho killer, and the film opened to critical and commercial acclaim.

== Filmography ==
Year	Title	Role	Language	Notes
2004	Jai	Shakib	Telugu	
2004	Gharshana	Panda	Telugu	
2005	Andarivaadu	Pandu	Telugu	
2005	Jagapati	MLA Goud's brother	Telugu	
2005	Andhrudu	Sinha/Munna	Telugu	
2006	Vettaiyaadu Vilaiyaadu	Ilamaran Anandhan	Tamil	
2007	Don	Robin	Telugu	
2008	Okka Magaadu		Telugu	
2009	Abhay	Pandu	Kannada	
2009	Kasko	Alauddin	Telugu	
2010	Seeta Ramula Kalyanam	Veera Pratap	Telugu	
2010	Golimaar	David	Telugu	
2011	Inki Toh Aisi Ki Thaisi		Hyderabadi	
2011	Bodyguard	Mhatre's brother	Hindi	
2014	Legend	James	Telugu	
2014	Prematho Nuvvu Vastavani		Telugu	
2019	Vinaya Vidheya Rama	Ranjit Singh	Telugu	
2020	Guns of Banaras	Tiwari	Hindi	
2021	Radhe	Nazamuddin	Hindi	
2021	Aaradugula Bullet	Shankar's henchmen	Telugu	
2023	Dhruva Natchathiram		Tamil	Unreleased film
2025	Hari Hara Veera Mallu	Hakim Khan	Telugu	
2025	They Call Him OG	Omi's Henchman	Telugu	
