= Onnum Mindathe =

- Official poster
- Malayalam : ഒന്നും മിണ്ടാതെ
- Directed by: Sugeeth
- Written by: Rajesh Raghavan
- Produced by: Shafeer Sait
- Starring: Jayaram; Meera Jasmine; Manoj K. Jayan
- Music by: Anil Johnson
- Production company: Qurban Films
- Distributed by: Ann Mega Media Release
- Release date: 29 March 2014 (India)
- Running time: 150 minutes
- Country: India
- Language: Malayalam

Onnum Mindathe (Without Saying anything) is a 2014 Indian Malayalam family-drama movie, produced by Shafeer Sait and directed by Sugeeth. The film stars Jayaram, Meera Jasmine, Manoj K. Jayan in the lead roles while Devi Ajith, Lalu Alex, Baby Anikha, Dharmajan Bolgatty, Joy Mathew, Valsala Menon, Ambika Mohan and Jayaraj Warrier playing supporting roles.

== Cast ==
- Jayaram as Sachidanandan
- Meera Jasmine as Shyama
- Manoj K. Jayan as Jose
- Sarayu as Rose
- Devi Ajith
- Shritha Sivadas
- Anikha Surendran as Ammu mol
- Dharmajan Bolgatty as Vinod
- Joy Mathew
- Chinnu Kuruvila as Sara George
- Valsala Menon
- Ambika Mohan
- Jayaraj Warrier
- Lalu Alex as Sadasivan, Sachidanandan's father

== Music ==
- "Thennalin"

Singer: Sangeetha Srinkanth

- "Onnu Mindathe"

Singer: K. J. Yesudas

- "Ariyampadathu"

Singer: Madhu Balakrishnan

- "Onnu Mindathe" (Male)

Singer: K. J. Yesudas

== Reception ==
A critic from The Times of India wrote that "Onnum Mindathe passes off leaving the feel of a cool breeze". A critic from Deccan Chronicle wrote that "Sugeeth's marital melodrama hints at the necessity of the sporadic lovemaking sessions in married life. And cautions against breaking the beauty of trust by venturing across that line that must not be crossed".
