= Soothradharan =

2001 film directed by A. K. Lohithadas

- DVD Cover
- Directed by: A. K. Lohithadas
- Written by: A. K. Lohithadas
- Produced by: Milan Jaleel
- Starring: Dileep; Meera Jasmine; Kalabhavan Mani; Bindu Panicker
- Cinematography: Alagappan N
- Edited by: Raja Mohammed
- Music by: Raveendran (Songs) S.P.Venkitesh (Background music)
- Release date: 15 December 2001
- Running time: 162 minutes
- Country: India
- Language: Malayalam

Soothradharan (transl. Strategist) is a 2001 Indian Malayalam-language crime drama film written and directed by A. K. Lohithadas and produced by Milan Jaleel under his banner Galaxy Films. The film stars Dileep and Meera Jasmine, while Kalabhavan Mani, Bindu Panicker, and Cochin Haneefa play other important roles.

The music of the movie was done by Raveendran master. This film marks the debut of Meera Jasmine. Bindu Panicker and Cochin Haneefa won the Second Best Actress and Second Best Actor Awards at the Kerala State Film Awards of India.

== Plot ==
Ramesan, who supports the five-member family by selling pickles and other eatables, reaches a border town named Pandavapuram under certain circumstances. He finds the conditions in Pandavapuram to be truly stark and dreary. The director dwells upon the ordeals of life in Pandavapuram. Ramesan is trying in vain to find his friend, Leelakrishnan, who acts as a hijada to make a living.

Devumma, who runs a brothel, gives him shelter. Seemingly oblivious to the impending doom, Sivani, a teenage girl, lives with Devumma and Raniamma. She falls in love with Ramesan. Bharathiyakka, an old inmate of the whorehouse, fills her wallet with money earned by selling virgins to infamous pimps. She persuades Devumma to sell Sivani to a rich and pompous Zamindar. Trapped between dreams of hard cash for sustenance and her affection for Sivani, Devumma is trying to save the lives of prostitutes by getting as much money as she can through this ordeal. Sivani's aspirations bite the dust leaving her emotionally shattered, when Devumma decides to sell her. But then matters are put in their proper perspective, and the director opts for the usual happy ending.

== Cast ==
- Dileep as Rameshan
- Meera Jasmine as Shivani
- Kalabhavan Mani as Sadanandan
- Cochin Haneefa as Rajamani
- Bindu Panicker as Devumma (Devayani)
- Salim Kumar as Leela Krishnan/Leelamani
- Chithra as Raniamma
- Kanakadurga as Bharathi
- Mansoor Ali Khan as Kannappa Chettiyar
- Mahesh

== Songs ==
The film had notable songs composed by Raveendran Master, and the lyrics written by S. Ramesan Nair

Song	Artist	Lyrics	Raga(s)
"Perariyam"	Sujatha Mohan	S. Ramesan Nair	Shuddha Dhanyasi
"Ravil Aaro Vennilavin"	K. J. Yesudas, Sujatha Mohan	S. Ramesan Nair	Kanada
"Madhumayee"	K. J. Yesudas	S. Ramesan Nair	Desh
"Irulunnu"	K. J. Yesudas	S. Ramesan Nair	
"Hari Ohm"	Viswanath, Gayathri Ashokan	S. Ramesan Nair	
"Dheem Thanana"	M. G. Sreekumar	S. Ramesan Nair	Aarabhi, Shree ragam
"Darshan"	Dr. S. P. Balasubrahmanyam	Dr. S. P. Ramesh	Ragamalika (Desh, Brindabani Sarang)

== Awards ==
Award	Category	Recipient
Kerala State Film Awards	Second Best Actor	Cochin Haneefa
Kerala State Film Awards	Second Best Actress	Bindu Panicker
Kerala Film Critics Association Award	Best Female Playback Singer	Sujatha Mohan
