= Andarivaadu =

2005 Telugu film directed by Srinu Vaitla

- Poster
- Directed by: Srinu Vaitla
- Written by: Story: Bhupathi Raja; Screenplay: Bhupathi Raja; Srinu Vaitla; Dialogues: Kona Venkat
- Produced by: Allu Aravind
- Starring: Chiranjeevi; Tabu; Rimi Sen; Rakshita
- Cinematography: Kabir Lal
- Edited by: Marthand K. Venkatesh
- Music by: Devi Sri Prasad
- Distributed by: Geetha Arts
- Release date: 4 June 2005
- Running time: 162 minutes
- Country: India
- Language: Telugu

Andarivaadu: Man of the Masses (transl. Everyone's man) is a 2005 India Telugu-language action comedy drama film directed by Srinu Vaitla. The film stars Chiranjeevi, Tabu, Rimi Sen, and Rakshita while Prakash Raj, Sunil, Sarath Babu, Sayaji Shinde, Sameer and Pradeep Rawat play supporting roles. The music was composed by Devi Sri Prasad. The film released on 4 June 2005.

== Plot ==
Govindarajulu is a construction worker who drinks a lot and lives a carefree life. On the other hand, his son Siddartha is a popular TV show host and a very disciplined man — the opposite of his father. Siddhu gets Govindu married to Shanti to sober him.

Siddhu is in love with Swetha, the daughter of a big-time contractor named Veerendra. Veerendra is a childhood friend of Govindu, but currently dislikes him because of his behavior. He agrees to get Swetha married to Siddhu but tells Govindu that for the marriage to take place, he must distance himself from Siddhu because Veerendra does not want to be publicly known as connected to Govindu. Govindu decides to fake kicking Siddhu out of the house to let his son be happy.

At the engagement, though, Siddhu publicly reveals the condition that Veerendra has given. It is revealed that Govindu's friend had told Siddhu about the condition, and Siddhu walks out of the engagement party with Govindu. When Veerendra complains about his reputation being ruined, Swetha decides to separate Govindu and Siddhu to get revenge. She begs Govindu to forgive her and take her as his daughter-in-law, as she had not known about Veerendra's condition. Govindu says that if Siddhu wants her, then he is willing to have her in the house because he holds no grudge and wants Siddhu to be happy. Siddhu decides that as long as Govindu is happy, he is too, and agrees to marry Swetha.

Meanwhile, Govindu has differences with a big-time rowdy contractor named Satti Pehelwan. Swetha moves into the house and starts creating differences between Govindu and Siddhu with the help of her cousin Sathi Babu, but she fails each time miserably. The rest of the film revolves around whether she succeeds in her schemes, as well as Satti Pehelwan's enmity and vengeance with the father-son duo.

== Cast ==
- Chiranjeevi as Govindarajulu "Govindu" and Siddharth "Siddhu"
- Panja Vaisshnav Tej as Young Siddhu
- Tabu as Shanti, Govindarajulu’s wife
- Rimi Sen as Swetha, Siddu's love interest
- Sarath Babu as Police Commissioner Narayana, Veerendra’s friend
- Rakshita as Cheetila Chinni / Janaki
- Sayaji Shinde as Minister Sadhu (Cameo)
- Prakash Raj as Veerendra (Eeru Babu), Swetha's father
- Nassar as Satyanarayana Murthy, Janaki's father
- Sudha as Amrutham, Shanti's mother
- Suman as Samarasimma Reddy, Shanti's father
- Pradeep Rawat as Satti Pehelwan
- Brahmanandam as Bangaraju, Siddu's co-reporter
- Sunil as Sathi Babu, Swetha's cousin and Nephew Of Veerendra
- Sameer as Police Inspector Shiva
- Geetha as Vasundhara, Govindarajaulu and Siddharth's paternal mother
- Suhasini Maniratnam as Snehalatha, Govindarajaulu and Siddharth's foster mother and Police’s family
- Sumithra as Lakshmi, Govindarajaulu and Siddharth's mother
- Janaki Sabesh as Annapurna, Govindu and Siddhu's friend mother
- Paruchuri Venkateswara Rao as Venkatachalam, Govindarajaulu and Siddharth's foster father
- Chandra Mohan as Chandram, Govindu and Siddhu's father
- Giri Babu as Rama Chandra Murthy, Govnidu and Siddhu's friend father
- Kaikala Satyanarayana as Sivaramakrishnayya, Govindu's and Siddhu's paternal father
- Krishna Bhagavan as Krishna, Govinda's friend
- M. S. Narayana as Thatharao, Govinda's friend
- Venu Madhav as Venu, Govinda's friend
- Hema as Jhansi, Swetha's mother Veerendra's wife
- Sana as Saraswathi, Janaki's mother
- Salim Baig as Pandu, Pahelwan's younger brother
- Dharmavarapu Subrahmanyam as Hitech Priest
- Vajja Venkata Giridhar as Dattu
- Kondavalasa Lakshmana Rao as Krishna Rao
- Madhu Shalini as Pooja
- Harish Shankar as Shankar
- Raghava Lawrence in a special appearance
- Master Sajja Teja as Siddhu's son (special appearance)

== Production ==
The muhurat shot took place on 28 October 2004.

== Soundtrack ==
The music was composed by Devi Sri Prasad.

| No. | Title | Singer(s) | Length |
|---|---|---|---|
| 1. | "Paduchu Bangarama" | Mallikarjun, Sumangali | 4:45 |
| 2. | "Ammamma Nee Meesam" | Kalpana, Udit Narayan | 4:46 |
| 3. | "Kodi Koora Chillu Gaari" | Tippu, Malathy Lakshman | 4:54 |
| 4. | "Andarivaadu" | Andrea Jeremiah | 3:57 |
| 5. | "Okati Rendu Moodu" | Shankar Mahadevan, Grace Karunas | 4:28 |
| 6. | "F T V Figaralle" | K.K, Sunitha Sarathy | 4:24 |
| Total length: | | | 27:38 |

== Reception ==
B. Anuradha of Rediff.com wrote "Barring some rib-tickling comedy, the much-hyped Andharivadu is a huge disappointment as it lacks a good storyline." A reviewer from Sify also echoed the same and stated: "There is nothing new as far as presentation goes and on the whole it is a damp squib. A Chiranjeevi film will work only if his larger-than-life image is given a new twist with something freash in treatment and director Seenu Vytla has not been able to provide the necessary punch." Jeevi of Idlebrain.com rated the film three out of five and wrote that "Andarivadu is definitely worth a watch for Govindarajulu character".
