= Maharathi (2007 film) =

2007 Telugu film by P. Vasu

- Theatrical release poster
- Directed by: P. Vasu
- Screenplay by: P. Vasu
- Story by: Thotapalli Madhu
- Produced by: Vakada Appa Rao
- Starring: Nandamuri Balakrishna; Jayaprada
- Cinematography: Sekhar V. Joseph
- Edited by: Suresh Urs
- Music by: Guru Kiran
- Production company: Sri Lalitha Kalanjali Productions
- Release date: 1 February 2007
- Running time: 149 minutes
- Country: India
- Language: Telugu

Maharathi is a 2007 Indian Telugu-language action drama film directed by P. Vasu and produced by Vakada Appa Rao. It stars Nandamuri Balakrishna in the lead role alongside Meera Jasmine, Sneha, Navaneet Kaur, Jayaprada, and Naresh. The music was composed by Guru Kiran. The film was dubbed into Tamil as Kuppathu Raja and was recorded as a flop at the box office.

== Plot ==
Bala works as a music teacher in the college of Naresh Chowdary. His look-alike Krishna Sarala Subrahmani a.k.a Krishna works as a dance master in Chamundeswari's college. Naresh's daughter Kalyani gradually falls in love with Krishna with the help of Bala. Krishna woos her and makes her fall in love with him but her love is rejected by her father Naresh. She pleads with him to accept her love but he remains unconvinced, enraged by this Kalyani locks herself in a room and demands Naresh Chowdary to bring Krishna to her. Then Bala convinces and advises Naresh Chowdary to meet Krishna and tells him to talk to Krishna. When Naresh Chowdary comes to learn that Krishna is working as a dance teacher in Chamundeswari's college he gets shocked and reveals that Chamundeswari is none other than her wife who was separated from him long back when Kalyani was a 2-year-old baby. Left with no choice Naresh Chowdary approaches Chamundeswari and requests her to convince Krishna to marry their daughter Kalyani. She agrees to this and both meet Krishna. Naresh Chowdary gets shocked after seeing Krishna as he looks exactly like his music teacher Bala. When Chamundeswari asks Krishna to marry his daughter he rejects their offer to their shock and starts acting as Bala. Naresh Chowdary finds this behavior and tells Chamundeswari that this Krishna is the one who worked as a music teacher in his college. When questioned about this, Krishna finally agrees to this telling them that he acted as Bala and reveals an unknown thing to them that he is neither Krishna nor Bala but Balayya.

Balayya is an uneducated simple guy who lives with his mother Saralamma in Visakhapatnam. A dance researcher Bhairavi comes to Visakhapatnam and starts making research on Balayya. In the process, Bhairavi falls in love with him. She makes him love her and change his lifestyle. Bhairavi tells about her love for her mother who is none other than Chamundeswari and she accepts her love but tries to stop the marriage somehow. Chamundeswari meets Saralamma and takes her to the marriage function hall and insults her. Pained by this, Saralamma goes missing. Balayya and Bhairavi both worry and start finding Saralamma. In the meanwhile, Chamundeswari tells Bhairavi about the marriage function hall she was taking care of for her marriage. They finally find her dead in a hospital. They come to know that Saralamma suicide herself after getting insulted by Chamundeswari before the marriage function hall. Bhairavi doubts this and feels her mother Chamundeswari was the reason behind her death and questions the same to her and when Chamundeswari tells her that she didn't like her to marry her to Balayya, Bhairavi out of remorse and shame kills herself as a punishment to Chamundeswari for being the reason for Saralamma's death. Balayya is left with no one, loses his mind, starts roaming, and after some time decides to teach Chamundeswari a lesson for her arrogance.

Now, Chamundeswari after listening to this finally apologizes for her acts and Balayya forgives her and unites Naresh Chowdary and her. Balayya then goes to Kalyani and accepts her love.

== Cast ==
- Balakrishna as Bala / Krishna Sarala Subrahmani / Balayya
- Jayaprada as Chamundeswari
- Meera Jasmine as Kalyani
- Sneha as Bhairavi
- Navaneet Kaur as Naveena
- Pradeep Rawat
- Jaya Prakash Reddy
- Naresh
- Venu Madhav
- Ali
- Thotapalli Madhu
- Sudeepa Pinky
- Satyam Rajesh
- Srinivasa Reddy
- Ping Pong Surya
- Chittajalu Lakshmipati
- Suthi Velu
- Rallapalli
- Subbaraya Sharma
- KK Sarma
- Ananth
- Gautam Raju
- Ashok Kumar
- Kadambari Kiran
- Visweswara Rao
- Kovai Sarala
- Vijaya Singh
- Rajitha
- Geetha Singh
- Vanaja

== Production ==
Balakrishna approached Thotapalli Madhu for a story which he prepared within 15 days. Balakrishna who was impressed with the story, went on to select the producer and director for the film. The film was launched on 30 April 2006 at Ramanaidu Studios. The first schedule began on Uttaranchal and held for twenty two days. The filming was completed on 12 October 2006.

== Soundtrack ==
Maharathi

Film score by Gurukiran
- Released: 2007
- Genre: Soundtrack
- Length: 27:12
- Label: Aditya Music
- Producer: Gurukiran

Music was composed by Gurukiran. The audio was directly released in markets on 6 November 2006.

No.	Title	Lyrics	Singer(s)	Length
1.	"Balakrishna"	Suddala Ashok Teja	Rajesh Krishnan	4:19
2.	"Mangamma Mangamma"	Ananta Sriram	Gurukiran, Chetana Acharya	4:29
3.	"Maja Maja"	Bhuvanachandra	Udit Narayan, Mahathi	4:05
4.	"Veeche Galulalo"	Suddala Ashok Teja	Vijay Yesudas	5:01
5.	"Uppu Cheppa Pappu"	Bhuvanachandra	Shankar Mahadevan, Bombay Jayashri	4:37
6.	"Kamala Kucha Chuchuka"	Bhuvanachandra	Gurukiran, Sumathi	4:41
Total length:				27:12

== Reception ==
Idlebrain wrote, "First half of the film is decent with Bala Krishna providing entertainment with his two roles. The second half is sluggish. The plus points of the film are Bala Krishna's efforts in a role of four different shades and the nice music. On the flipside, the direction is a bit old-fashioned". Rediff wrote, "All in all, the screenplay lacks consistency and is quite slack at places, something not expected of Vasu. The film is also crammed with songs and action sequences. Music, too is uninspiring. Though the characters are well etched, the narration is too slow".
