= Jagapati =

- DVD cover
- Directed by: Jonnalagadda Srinivasa Rao
- Written by: Janardhan Maharshi (dialogues)
- Screenplay by: Jonnalagadda Srinivasa Rao
- Story by: V.S. Saravanan
- Produced by: M. Ramalinga Raju; V. Satyanarayana Raju
- Starring: Jagapati Babu; Rakshita
- Cinematography: V. Jayaram
- Edited by: Kola Bhaskar
- Music by: M. M. Keeravani
- Production company: Roja Enterprises
- Release date: 23 June 2005
- Running time: 134 minutes
- Country: India
- Language: Telugu

Jagapati is a 2005 Indian Telugu-language film produced by M. Ramalinga Raju, V. Satyanarayana Raju on Roja Enterprises banner and directed by Jonnalagadda Srinivasa Rao. It stars Jagapati Babu, Rakshita. The music was composed by M. M. Keeravani.

== Cast ==
- Jagapati Babu as Jagapati
- Rakshita as Lavanya
- Navneet Kaur as Divya
- Pradeep Rawat as MLA Goud
- Tanikella Bharani as Kunkumaiah
- Chandra Mohan as Chandram, Murari's father
- Sai Kiran as Murari
- Salim Baig as MLA Goud's brother
- Subbaraju as Bandaraju
- Krishna Bhagawan as Constable
- M. S. Narayana
- Raghu Babu as Register
- Kondavalasa as Constable
- Raja Ravindra as Reporter Raju
- Madhu as Goon
- Suman Setty
- Duvvasi Mohan as Beggar
- Sirisha
- Karuna as Lalitha
- Padma Jayanthi as Goud's wife

== Soundtrack ==
Jagapati

Film score by M. M. Keeravani
- Released: 12 May 2005
- Genre: Soundtrack
- Length: 21:24
- Label: Supreme Music
- Producer: M. M. Keeravani

M. M. Keeravani chronology
Rog (2005)	Jagapati (2005)	Paheli (2005)

Music composed by M. M. Keeravani. Lyrics written by Chandrabose. Music released on Supreme Music Company.

No.	Title	Singer(s)	Length
1.	"Nuvve Na Pranam"	Udit Narayan, Shreya Ghoshal	4:14
2.	"Nenu Ninnu Ishtapadindi"	M M Keeravani, Sumangali	4:21
3.	"Cheera Kattu Vayasu"	Tippu, K. S. Chithra	4:18
4.	"Chandamamaki Kaluva"	Tippu, K. S. Chithra	4:21
5.	"Choose Koddi Ninne"	S. P. Balasubrahmanyam, K. S. Chithra	4:10
Total length:			21:24
