= Pilla Zamindar =

- Film poster
- Directed by: G. Ashok
- Written by: G. Ashok
- Based on: A Millionaire's First Love by Kim Eun-sook
- Produced by: D. S. Rao
- Starring: Nani; Haripriya; Bindu Madhavi
- Cinematography: Sai Sriram
- Edited by: Prawin Pudi
- Music by: Selvaganesh
- Production company: Sri Shailendra Cinemas
- Distributed by: Immortal Films (USA)
- Release date: 14 October 2011
- Running time: 148 minutes
- Country: India
- Language: Telugu

Pilla Zamindar (transl. Little Zamindar) (Note: Spelt as Pilla Zameendar on the CBFC certificate.) is a 2011 Indian Telugu-language coming-of-age comedy drama film written and directed by G. Ashok. The film stars Nani, Haripriya, and Bindu Madhavi while Srinivas Avasarala, Dhanraj, Thagubothu Ramesh, Rao Ramesh and Nagineedu play supporting roles. The plot follows Praveen "PJ" Jayaramaraju (Nani), an arrogant youngster who is set to inherit his grandfather's wealth but must fulfil certain conditions in order to do so. It is loosely based on the 2006 Korean movie A Millionaire's First Love and is also a partial retelling of The Ultimate Gift (2006). The film has soundtrack composed by Selvaganesh. Pilla Zamindar was released on 14 October 2011.

Pilla Zamindar was a commercial success at the box office.

== Plot ==
Praveen "PJ" Jayaramaraju, the grandson of wealthy zamindar, Rudra Ramaraju, is a spoiled, arrogant youngster. He attends lavish parties and wastes money. He also breaks up with Sindhu when she exposes his cheating in an exam. On PJ's 18th birthday, his dying grandfather's will with several conditions is presented to him. It states that PJ would inherit the entire wealth, subject to the following conditions:

1. He should complete his graduation as a common man without any luxuries in Srimathi Mangamma Government Degree College.
2. He must also complete it within three years.
3. He needs to stay at Rajanna hostel in Siripuram and manage living with very little money (similar to other students who study on scholarship).

In addition, another clause would state that it will be told three months after joining the college.

PJ goes to the village and meets Rajanna, the hostel warden. He joins the college but struggles to adjust to the surroundings. He becomes good friends with Kanna Babu, Jaatheeyam, Maqbool, and others. Sindhu also comes to study at the same college in her hometown. While PJ struggles to adapt to simple village life, he passes the supplementary exams with the help of Sindhu, who scribes for him because his hands are wounded.

Three months after he joins the college, another condition is revealed: he must be elected student union president, and he must not engage in any physical altercations during his time there. PJ begins to adapt to the conditions and changes his lavish lifestyle. Slowly, he realizes the value of life and human beings.

In the second year of his degree, the science professor suggests to PJ that he should run for president by bribing people with alcohol and money, but it backfires after Ammiraju's henchman informs the entire college about this, and he loses the respect and trust of all his friends and Rajanna. When a disheartened PJ tries to abandon the college, he helps some kids whose school gets closed due to excessive rainfall, he gets to see his old, abandoned house, and starts reminiscing about his childhood memories and flashbacks. Rajanna reveals the true purpose and reasons behind his grandfather's condition. PJ's father had previously studied in the same college where he met his future wife (PJ's mother). Rajanna and PJ's father were friends, and the former is like an uncle to PJ. PJ's father married against Ramaraju's wishes, and as a result, he was deprived of his inheritance. Ramaraju later realizes his mistake, but his son and daughter-in-law died in an accident, and PJ grows to be the arrogant, rich person he is. PJ now realizes that people are more important than money. He falls in love with Sindhu, who reciprocates his feelings.

In the final year, PJ forms a student club and helps the villagers in various ways, including bringing the teachers back to the school and fixing the roads and potholes. Ammiraju, who is also the opponent of PJ in the election, tries to win by playing the caste card but fails. PJ provides logical arguments for improving the college and gets elected, satisfying the last of his grandfather's wishes.

PJ not only fulfills the conditions laid down by his grandfather but also becomes a good person. On the day of his graduation, he risks his entire property to save Kanna Babu's life. As PJ was ready to abandon his property to save a friend in need, he earned back his wealth and the love of all.

During the mid-credits scene, Ammiraju hires a gangster, Bangkok, to kidnap Sindhu and ruin her life as well as her reputation. But Chamki gets kidnapped instead because of his disguise. PJ's friends also informed him of Sindhu's kidnapping, but after witnessing that Sindhu had just heard this and standing unscathed, they realized what had happened after Pulakesi searched for Chamki. Unknown about this blunder committed by Bangkok, Ammiraju calls PJ to tell him that he will succeed in his motive. PJ tries to stop him, but Ammiraju doesn't listen. He goes to commit a crime, and his friends have fun, only to realize Bangkok's mistake later on.

== Cast ==
- Nani as Praveen Jayaramaraju alias PJ
- Haripriya as Sindhu
- Bindu Madhavi as Amrutha, PJ's Cousin
- Srinivas Avasarala as Kanna Babu
- Dhanraj as Jaatheeyam
- Thagubothu Ramesh as Maqbool
- Rao Ramesh as Principal Military Rajanna
- Nagineedu as Rudra Ramaraju
- M. S. Narayana as Uddhandam, a Telugu lecturer
- Naramalli Sivaprasad as Sharath Chandra, a lawyer
- Randhir Gattla as Ammiraju
- Satya as Pulakesi
- Vennela Kishore as Sarkar
- Sameer Hasan as Science Teacher
- Tarzan as Sports Teacher
- Sarika Ramachandra Rao as Hindi Lecturer
- Shankar Melkote as PJ's ex-college principal
- Narsing Yadav as Adavi Rambabu
- Raghu Karumanchi as Ramana
- Venu Yeldandi as Bangkok
- Naveen Neny as Chamki, PJ's effeminate friend
- Meghna Naidu as an item number in the song "Rangu Rangu"

== Production ==
Nani and Srinivas Avasarala are once again seen together in this film after Ashta Chamma. G. Ashok opted for most of the same crew who previously worked with him in Aakasa Ramanna for this film. They include Praveen Poodi handling editing, Sai Sriram handling the camera, Chandrashekar writing the dialogues, and finally Manivasan handling art. Popular Kannada actress Haripriya was cast as Sindhu, the love interest of the main lead. Bindu Madhavi was cast as Amrutha, and Srinivas Avasarala was cast as Nani's friend. Being a comedy film, it features most of the Telugu comedians like M. S. Narayana, Dhanraj, Ramesh, Raghu, Venu, and Vennela Kishore. Meghna Naidu did a special song in the movie. M. S. Narayana was cast in the role of a Telugu lecturer, his previous real-life job before becoming an actor. Chandrashekar Gundimeda assisted Ashok with the dialogues. Shooting of the film began in October 2010 and was initially planned to be released in April 2011. but the film got delayed due to the 2011 Telugu film industry strike. The movie was completed in August 2011 and the film was released in October 2011. Shooting was predominantly done in Hyderabad and Guntur.

== Soundtrack ==
Pilla Zamindar

Soundtrack album by Selvaganesh
- Released: 14 October 2011
- Genre: Film soundtrack
- Label: Aditya Music
- Producer: Selvaganesh

Audio release of the film was held on 19 September 2011 in Prasads Lab, Hyderabad. The audio was released and distributed by Aditya Music. The music of this film was composed by Selvaganesh. The audio was well received. Telugu lyricist Krishna Chaitanya penned 5 songs in the film while Sri Mani wrote the remaining one song.

No.	Title	Lyrics	Artist(s)	Length
1.	"Thalabadi"	Krishna Chaitanya	Shankar Mahadevan	4:56
2.	"Chuttu Chuttu"	Krishna Chaitanya	Saindhavi, Prasanna	4:16
3.	"Oopiri"	Krishna Chaitanya	Karthik, Chinmayi	4:40
4.	"Rangu Rangu"	Krishna Chaitanya	Mukesh, Priya Himesh	4:38
5.	"PJ Club Mix"	Krishna Chaitanya	Ranjith, Priya Himesh, Rap: Bigg Nikk	4:34
6.	"Haiyayo"	Sri Mani	Solar Sai	3:40
Total length:				26:44

== Release and reception ==
The film was released worldwide on 14 October 2011. Jeevi of Idlebrain.com rated the film 3/5 and praised Nani's acting. Reviewer from CNN-IBN gave a positive review stating that the movie is above average and Nani's performance impressive. The film was successful at the box-office.
