= Abhay (2009 film) =

- DVD cover
- Directed by: Mahesh Babu
- Screenplay by: Mahesh Babu
- Story by: Janardhana Maharshi
- Produced by: B G Babu Reddy
- Starring: Darshan; Aarti Thakur
- Cinematography: Ramesh Babu
- Edited by: Kiran Kumar K L
- Music by: V. Harikrishna
- Production company: Nithin Productions
- Release date: 2 October 2009
- Running time: 140 minutes
- Country: India
- Language: Kannada

Abhay is a 2009 Indian Kannada-language masala film directed by Mahesh Babu and produced by Babu Reddy under Nithin Productions banner. The film stars Darshan and Aarti Thakur in the lead roles, while Pradeep Rawat, Om Prakash Rao and Salim Baig appear in pivotial roles.

== Cast ==
- Darshan as Abhay
- Aarti Thakur as Aarti
- Pradeep Rawat as MLA Narasimha Murthy
- Om Prakash Rao as Shastri
- Salim Baig as Paandu, MLA Narasimha's brother
- Mangalore Suresh

== Production ==
Miss India World 2006 Aarti Thakur made her debut with this film. The film was shot in Bangalore, Bangkok, Mysore and Switzerland. Filming was completed in mid-2009.

== Soundtrack ==
All the songs are composed and scored by V. Harikrishna.

Sl No	Song title	Singer(s)	Lyricist
1	"Baanu Kempadante"	Sunitha Goparaju	Jayanth Kaikini
2	"Yaako Eno"	Sonu Nigam	V. Nagendra Prasad
3	"Neene Kane"	Tippu, Anuradha Bhat	Kaviraj
4	"Shaane Bhoga"	Malgudi Subha	V. Nagendra Prasad
5	"Yammo Mayammo"	Rajesh Krishnan	V. Nagendra Prasad
6	"Abhay is Crazy"	Karthik	V. Nagendra Prasad

== Reception ==
Sify gave 3/5 stars and wrote "Darshan is back with yet another formula film. The film is a mix of stale plots and unrewarding scenes." The Times of India gave 3/5 stars and wrote "This film, directed by Mahesh Babu, has a masala mix of fights, romance, drama and action that's strictly for Darshan fans." R. G. Vijayasarathy of Rediff gave 2/5 stars and wrote "Abhay is strictly meant for Darshan fans." Bangalore Mirror wrote "A film that will appeal only to Darshan fans but not in a way that they would want to pay and watch again."
