= Paattinte Palazhy =

- Directed by: Rajeev Anchal
- Written by: Rajendra Babu
- Produced by: A. K. Pillai
- Starring: Meera Jasmine; Manoj.K.Jayan; Revathi; Jagathy Sreekumar; Nedumudi Venu
- Cinematography: Alagappan N
- Edited by: Sreekumar
- Music by: Dr. Suresh Manimala
- Release date: 20 August 2010
- Country: India
- Language: Malayalam

Paattinte Palazhy is a 2010 Indian Malayalam film directed by Rajeev Anchal. It has Meera Jasmine and Revathy in lead roles. Manoj.K.Jayan and Jagathy Sreekumar also play prominent roles in this film. Meera plays the role of a playback singer in the film.

Jagathy Sreekumar plays the father to Meera's character. Nedumudi Venu plays a full-length role in this film. The movie featured six songs written by veteran poet O.N.V. Kurup. The music was produced by Dr. Suresh Manimala, a debutant in the film industry.

== Plot ==
Veena aspires to become a world-renowned singer. When she realizes that the music within her has no way of flowing out, she is driven almost to madness but eventually finds a way to express it. Her father Sheshadri, Guru Usthad, Aamir, Dr. Aparna, Ganapathi, and young music director, Sreehari, compete for their share of her voice. With their help, she finds the best way to share her music.

== Cast ==
- Meera Jasmine as Veena
- Manoj K. Jayan as Ameer
- Revathi as Dr. Aparna
- Jagathy Sreekumar as Seshadri
- Balabhaskar (voice dubbed by Sarath)
- Nedumudi Venu as Usthad Ameer
- Krishna Kumar
- Prem Kumar
- Sooraj Fasiluddin(guest role)
- Shomy Easow as Sunny
- Saji Sadasivan

== Production ==
The film marked the comeback of Meera Jasmine to Malayalam film industry after a gap. Rajeev was inspired from reality musical shows which prompted him to come up with a concept of "story of a singer who lived only for music". The filming started on 2 January 2010, and the major parts were shot in Coorg, Chennai, and Scot House in Mysore.

== Soundtrack ==
The film features a soundtrack written by veteran poet O. N. V. Kurup and composed by the debutant Dr. Suresh Manimala.

Song	Singer(s)	Notes
"Sathathanthriyakum"	K. S. Chithra	
"Ponnum Noolil"	K. S. Chithra	
"Azar Usko"	K. S. Chithra	
"Udayasooryane"	K. S. Chithra and Aparna Rajeev	
"Ammakkuruvi"	K. S. Chithra and Aparna Rajeev	
"Pattupaduvan"	Hariharan	Won the Kerala State Award for Best Playback Singer in 2011
"Oru Malar Manchalumay"	Vijay Yesudas and Shweta Mohan	

== Reception ==
A critic from Rediff.com wrote that "Overall, Pattinte Palazhy has a lot of promise but fizzles out by the end".
