= Navneet Kaur Rana =

Indian actress and politician (born 1985)

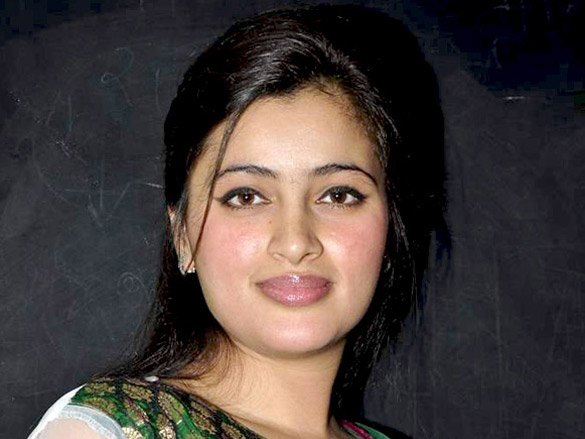
- Kaur in 2019

Member of Parliament, Lok Sabha
- In office 23 May 2019 – 4 June 2024
- Preceded by: Anandrao Adsul
- Succeeded by: Balwant Wankhade
- Constituency: Amravati

Personal details
- Born: Navneet Kaur; 6 April 1985 (age 41) Mumbai, Maharashtra, India
- Party: Bharatiya Janata Party (since 2024)
- Other political affiliations: Independent (2019-2024); Nationalist Congress Party (until 2019)
- Occupations: Politician; Actress
- Spouse: Ravi Rana (m. 2011)
- Children: 2

Navneet Kaur Rana (born 6 April 1985), also known as Navneet Ravi Rana, is an Indian politician and former actress, primarily known for her work in Telugu cinema. She was elected as a Member of Parliament (MP) from Amravati in the 2019 Lok Sabha elections as an independent candidate. In the 2024 elections, she contested from the same constituency on a BJP ticket but lost to Congress candidate Balwant Wankhede by a margin of 19,731 votes.

== Film career ==
Kaur was born and brought up in Mumbai, Maharashtra, India. Her parents are of Punjabi origin of Ravidassia caste; her father was an army official. She completed her studies up to 10th standard in Karthika High School, Kurla (Mumbai). After finishing 12th class, she discontinued her education and began working as a model, going on to appear in six music videos. Kaur made her feature film debut in "Darshan" a Kannada film. Then followed her debut in Telugu with Seenu Vasanthi Lakshmi (2004). Chetna (2005), Jagapathi (2005), Good Boy (2005), and Bhuma (2008) are some of her subsequent releases. Additional works include Kalachakram, Terror, Flash News and Jabilamma, which was a Telugu remake of the Hindi film Chameli. She was a contestant in the Gemini TV reality show Humma Humma. She starred in the Malayalam film Love In Singapore, directed by Rafi Mecartin. In 2010, she acted in the Punjabi film Lad Geya Pecha opposite Gurpreet Ghuggi.

== Political career ==
After the marriage with Ravi Rana, she unsuccessfully contested the 2014 Lok Sabha Election as a Nationalist Congress Party candidate.

She was elected as an MP from Amravati, Maharashtra constituency in Lok Sabha Elections 2019 as an independent candidate, with support of Indian National Congress and Nationalist Congress Party defeating Anandrao Adsul of Shiv Sena. In this election as an independent candidate, she has spent Rs.65 Lakh while the previous two times MP, Adsul has spent Rs.49 Lakh for a democratic process.

On various level (i.e. local, regional and national; in public or, in various institutions like Lok Sabha) she is seen to have altercation with Shiv Sena and its party members time-to-time.

=== Joining BJP ===
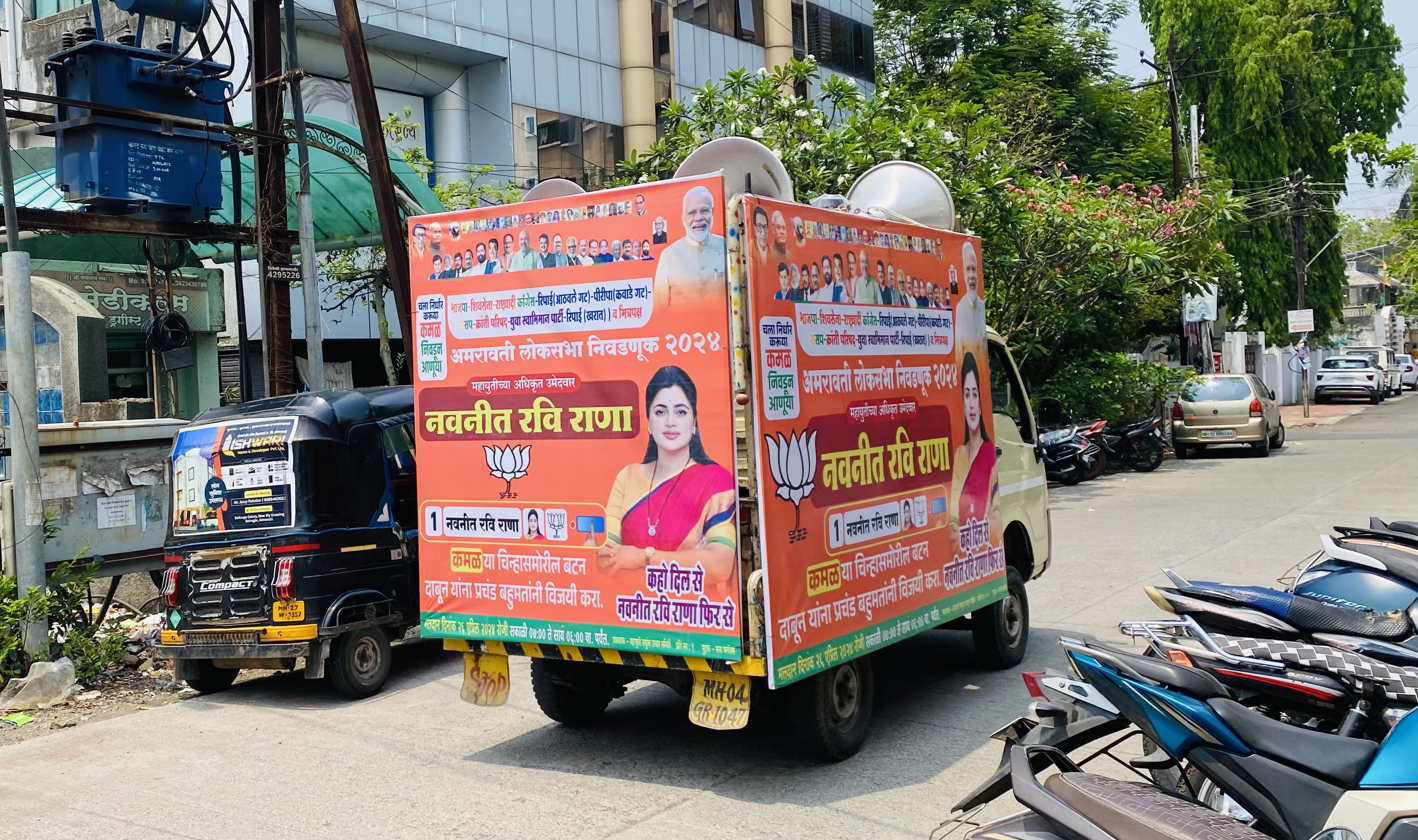
Campaign of Navneet Rana in General Elections 2024.

She joined the Bharatiya Janta Party on 28 March 2024 and contested from Amravati Lok Sabha constituency as a BJP candidate in the 2024 general elections but lost the seat to Balwant Baswant Wankhade of Indian National Congress.

== Controversies ==
On 8 June 2021, the High Court of Bombay fined her Rs. 2 lakh, for submitting a fake Mochi caste certificate. The court cancelled her caste certificate, however, it remained silent on the validity of her position as an elected representative from a Lok Sabha seat reserved for people belonging to Scheduled Caste category. On 4 April 2024, the Supreme Court of India reversed the Bombay High Court's judgement and mentioned that there was no reason for the High Court to interfere in Scrutiny Committee's decision to validate Kaur's Scheduled Caste certificate of Sikh- Chamar.

In April 2022, Kaur and her husband Ravi were arrested by Mumbai police following their insistence to recite Hanuman Chalisa in front of Matoshree the residence of then Maharashtra Chief Minister Uddhav Thackeray, with charges of sedition, promoting enmity and assaulting a public servant to prevent discharge of duty. Later they were sent to 14 days of judicial custody, where Rana was sent to the Byculla women's jail on the orders of local magistrate.

== Personal life ==
After a short hiatus from her film career, on 3 February 2011, she married Ravi Rana, an independent MLA from Badnera constituency in Amravati city. It has been reported that they got married along with a mass marriage ceremony.

== Filmography ==
Year	Film	Role	Language	Notes
2004	Seenu Vasanthi Lakshmi	Lakshmi	Telugu	
2004	Darshan	Nandini	Kannada	
2004	Sathruvvu		Telugu	
2005	Chetna: The Excitement	Aastha	Hindi	
2005	Jagapati	Divya	Telugu	
2005	Good Boy	Krishna Veni	Telugu	
2005	Sitam	Sharmila	Hindi	
2006	Style		Telugu	Special appearance
2006	Roommates	Pallavi	Telugu	
2006	Ranam		Telugu	Special appearance
2007	Maharadhi	Naveena	Telugu	
2007	Yamadonga	Rambha	Telugu	
2007	Bangaru Konda	Alekhya	Telugu	
2008	Bhuma		Telugu	
2008	Jabilamma	Jabilamma	Telugu	
2008	Terror		Telugu	
2008	Arasangam	Aarthi	Tamil	
2008	Love In Singapore	Diana Perreira	Malayalam	
2009	Flash News	Nakshatra	Telugu	
2009	Edukondalavada Venkataramana Andaru Bagundali		Telugu	
2010	Lad Gaya Pecha	Lovely	Punjabi	
2010	Nirnayam		Telugu	
2010	Kalachakram		Telugu	
2010	Ambasamudram Ambani	Nandhini	Tamil	
2010	Chhevan Dariya (The Sixth River)	Reet	Punjabi	

=== Music videos ===
Year	Album	Song	Singer	Co-star
2001	Dil Ka Haal Sune Dilwala	Dil Ka Haal Sune Dilwala	Altaf Raja	
2002	Dil Mera Dhadkan Teri	Akhiyon Mein Akhiyaan Daal Ke	Anuradha Paudwal & Nitin Mukesh	Arjan Bajwa
2002	Dil Mera Dhadkan Teri	Inn Nasheeli Aankhon Se	Anuradha Paudwal & Nitin Mukesh	

Lok Sabha
Preceded by Anandrao Adsul	Member of Parliament for Amravati; 2019	Incumbent
