= Andhrudu =

2005 film by Paruchuri Murali

- DVD cover
- Directed by: Paruchuri Murali
- Written by: Story & Screenplay: Paruchuri Murali; Dialogues: Ramesh-Gopi; Swamyji-Vijay
- Produced by: M. L. Kumar Chowdary
- Starring: Gopichand; Gowri Pandit
- Cinematography: Vijay C. Kumar
- Edited by: Marthand K. Venkatesh
- Music by: Kalyani Malik
- Production company: Sree Keerthi Creations
- Release date: 19 August 2005
- Running time: 163 minutes
- Country: India
- Language: Telugu
- Box office: ₹7 crore distributors' share

Andhrudu (transl. 'Andhra man') is a 2005 Indian Telugu-language romantic action drama film written and directed by Paruchuri Murali and produced by M. L. Kumar Chowdary. The film stars Gopichand and Gowri Pandit in her debut role, with music composed by Kalyani Malik. The film follows an Andhra man who travels to the lawless land of Bihar to win back his lover after she calls off their engagement, while dealing with her family's conflicts and the violent gangs involved.

Andhrudu was a commercial success at the box office. The film was remade in Tamil as Konjam Sirippu Konjam Kobam (2011).

== Plot ==
Surendra is an honest and passionate Sub-Inspector who is framed by a corrupt colleague, leading to a conflict with his superior, Assistant Commissioner of Police (ACP) Ranveer Sinha. Meanwhile, Ranveer's daughter Archana, an aspiring singer, studies music under the renowned teacher Viswanatha Sastry, who happens to be Surendra's father. As Surendra and Archana meet and grow closer, they develop a strong bond. Despite Surendra's dismissal from the police force, he remains determined to clear his name and continues his pursuit of justice.

A flashback reveals Ranveer’s troubled past. Originally from Bihar, Ranveer grew up in a joint family that was massacred by bandits, with only he and his sister surviving by hiding under the bodies of their relatives. His uncle, who also survived, promises his daughter to Ranveer, although he has no romantic feelings for her. Choosing to pursue his education, Ranveer becomes an IPS officer with the support of his uncle. Meanwhile, his cousin, Rana, marries Ranveer’s sister, and Ranveer falls in love with a Telugu girl in Andhra Pradesh. However, when Rana’s sister learns of this relationship, she commits suicide. Rana blames Ranveer for her death and attempts to kill him. Ranveer is saved by his sister’s plea but is ostracised from Bihar. He later marries Archana’s mother and settles in Andhra Pradesh, though he remains distressed by his estrangement from his sister.

In the present day, ACP Ranveer confronts Archana about her growing friendship with Surendra, dismissing him as arrogant and hot-headed. However, Archana defends Surendra’s sincerity, recounting how he saved her life in the past. Impressed by Surendra’s character, Ranveer proposes a marriage alliance between Surendra and Archana, which is accepted by both families.

On the day of the engagement, Ranveer receives a call from his long-estranged sister, asking for a matrimonial alliance between her son Munna and Archana. Munna, who had previously seen Archana in a religious ceremony in Andhra Pradesh, is eager to marry her. Munna’s affection for Archana leads Rana to reconcile with Ranveer. Although conflicted, Ranveer agrees not to break the engagement, despite his desire to. Archana overhears this conversation and writes a letter to Surendra. After reading the letter, Surendra makes strong demands from ACP Ranveer: to reinstate him into police service, promote him, and publicly apologise for his earlier suspension. Surendra’s father, angered by these demands, disowns him, and the engagement is called off.

Later, Ranveer visits Surendra’s family and explains that Surendra had deliberately staged the drama to cancel the engagement, allowing Ranveer to reconcile with his sister's family in Bihar. Grateful for Surendra’s sacrifice, Ranveer prepares to leave for Bihar to marry Archana to Munna. Meanwhile, Ranveer confesses to Archana that if she truly loved Surendra, he would not want her to marry Munna. In a selfless effort to reunite her father with his family, Archana sacrifices her love for Surendra and agrees to marry Munna.

The rest of the film follows Surendra as he travels to Bihar to win back Archana’s love.

== Cast ==
- Gopichand as Sub-Inspector Surendra, Viswanatha Sastry’s son & Archana’s husband
- Gowri Pandit as Archana, Surendra’s Wife
- Salim Baig as Munna, Rana's son
- K. Viswanath as Viswanatha Sastry, Surendra's father
- Pawan Malhotra as Commissioner Ranveer Sinha, Archana's father
- Sayaji Shinde as Rana, an MP and Ranveer Sinha's brother-in-law
- Dharmavarapu Subramanyam as CI
- Pruthvi Raj as ACP
- Sunil as Thief
- Haritha as Archana's mother
- Sudeepa Pinky as Archana's sister
- Ravi Babu as Thief
- Lakshmipathi as Thief
- Duvvasi Mohan as Constable
- Vinaya Prasad as Munna's mother, Ranveer Sinha's sister
- Gundu Sudarshan
- Master Deepak as Chintu
- Madhu Sharma as a dancer in the song "Pari Aayi"

== Production ==
Andhrudu was produced by M. L. Kumar Chowdary under the Sree Keerthi Creations banner and directed by Paruchuri Murali. Prior to Andhrudu, Murali had directed Nee Sneham (2002) and Pedababu (2004). This film marked Murali's continued collaboration with Sree Keerthi Creations after the success of Pedababu. Andhrudu was Kumar Chowdary's sixth film as a producer and the fourth under the Sree Keerthi Creations banner.

Following the success of Yagnam (2004), Gopichand signed on for Andhrudu, a mass entertainer recommended by director Teja, who had first approved the story before presenting it to him. Model Gowri Pandit made her acting debut with this film.

The film's muhurtam ceremony was held at Annapurna Studios on 18 November 2004. During the event, Jr. NTR sounded the clapboard on the lead pair, D. Suresh Babu switched on the camera, and the first shot was directed by S. S. Rajamouli.

== Music ==
Andhrudu

Soundtrack album by Kalyani Malik
- Released: 23 July 2005
- Recorded: 2005
- Genre: Soundtrack
- Length: 27:35
- Label: Aditya Music
- Producer: Kalyan Koduri

Kalyani Malik chronology
| Manasu Maata Vinadhu (2004) | Andhrudu (2005) | Boss - I Love You (2006) |

The music for Andhrudu was composed by Kalyani Malik, and the audio soundtrack was released under the Aditya Music label. Most of the songs in the film were situational, with the exception of a duet.

The audio was launched on 23 July 2005 at a function held at Viceroy Convention Hall in Hyderabad, where D. Ramanaidu officially released the soundtrack.

Track-List
| No. | Title | Lyrics | Singer(s) | Length |
|---|---|---|---|---|
| 1. | "Gundello Yemundo" | Bhaskarabhatla Ravi Kumar | Dhanunjay, Sahithi | 5:29 |
| 2. | "Kokilamma" | Chandrabose | Shreya Goshal | 3:58 |
| 3. | "O Sari Preminchaka" | Chandrabose | KK | 3:48 |
| 4. | "Pari Aayi Parades" | Bhuvana Chandra | Kalyani Malik, Mathangi | 4:35 |
| 5. | "Pranam Lo Prananga" | Chandrabose | K. S. Chithra | 4:49 |
| 6. | "Purushudi Kosam" | Chandrabose | Kalyani Malik, Mathangi | 4:43 |
| Total length: | | | | 27:35 |

== Reception ==
Jeevi of Idlebrain.com rated the film 3/5 and wrote that Andhrudu is an average film, praising Gopichand's performance, the comedy track, and cinematography, but criticising the slow pacing and lack of emotional depth in the storyline.

== Awards ==
- Sunil won Nandi Award for Best Male Comedian for his role in this film.
