= Pradeep Rawat (actor) =

Indian actor (1952–2026)

Pradeep Ram Singh Rawat
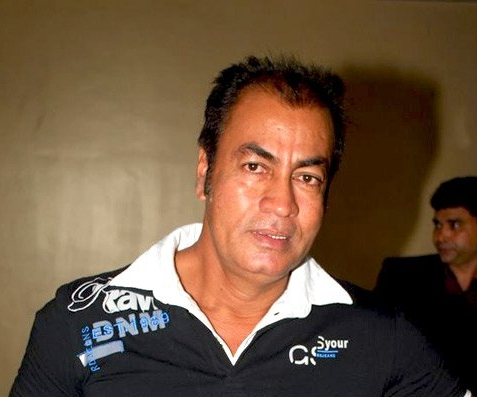
- Rawat in 2014
- Born: 21 January 1952; Jabalpur, Madhya Pradesh, India
- Died: 4 August 2026 (aged 74); Mumbai, Maharashtra, India
- Occupation: Actor
- Years active: 1983–2026
- Spouse: Kalyani Rawat
- Children: 2

Pradeep Rawat (21 January 1952 – 4 August 2026) was an Indian actor who worked predominantly in Hindi, Telugu and Tamil language films. Notable for playing villainous roles, Rawat's first appearance was in B.R. Chopra's Mahabharat as Ashwatthama.

== Life and career ==
Rawat was born in Jabalpur, Madhya Pradesh, India on 21 January 1952. He was introduced into Telugu cinema with the film Sye. In Tamil cinema, he acted in the film Ghajini (2005) where he appeared in a double negative role. He reprised his role in the Hindi remake. He debuted in Kannada cinema with Parodi; Malayalam cinema with China Town; Bengali cinema with Hero 420 and Bhojpuri cinema with Crack Fighter.

Rawat died of blood cancer in Mumbai, on 4 August 2026, at the age of 74.

== Awards ==
- 2004: Winner, Filmfare Best Villain Award (Telugu) for Sye
- 2004: Winner, Santosham Best Villain Award for Sye
- 2004: Winner, Nandi Award for Best Villain for Sye
- 2012: Nominated – SIIMA Award for Best Actor in a Negative Role (Telugu) for Mangala
- 2014: Nominated – SIIMA Award for Best Actor in a Negative Role (Telugu) for Naayak

== Filmography ==
=== Telugu ===
List of Pradeep Rawat Telugu film credits
Year	Movie	Role	Notes
2004	Sye	Bikshu Yadav	Filmfare Award for Best Villain
2005	Bhadra	Veerayya	
2005	Andarivadu	Satti Bihari	
2005	Jagapati	MLA Goud	
2005	Chhatrapati	Ras Bihari	
2006	Lakshmi	Rayudu	
2006	Maayajaalam	MP Pradeep	
2006	Hanumanthu	Krishna Murthy "KM"	
2006	Stalin	MLA	
2007	Desamuduru	Tambi Durai	
2007	Yogi	Narsing Pahilwan	
2007	Maharadhi		
2007	Jagadam	Manikyam	
2007	Maisamma IPS	Khan Bhaiyya	
2008	Veedhi Rowdy		
2008	Nagaram	Kaasim Bhai	
2008	Bhale Dongalu	Veer Raju	
2008	Homam	Police Officer Vishwanath	
2008	Baladur	Umapathi	
2008	Adivishnu	Yadagiri	
2008	Raksha	Sanathan Baba	
2009	Maska	Shinde	
2009	Mesthri	Subbaraju	
2009	Mitrudu		
2009	Oy!	Ras Bihari	
2009	Kasko	Basavanna	
2010	Panchakshari	Radeep/Billa Bhai	
2010	Ragada	Peddhanna	
2011	Mangala		
2011	Chattam		
2011	Veera	Pedda Rayudu	
2011	Rajanna		
2011	Dalapati		
2012	All the Best	Razak	
2012	Rebel	Simhadri	
2012	Nippu	Raja Goud	
2012	Poola Rangadu	Lala Goud	
2012	Adhinayakudu	Ramappa	
2012	Genius	MLA Nanaji	
2013	Sevakudu	Balram Jadoo	
2013	Naayak	Minister Rawat	
2013	Baadshah	Violent Victor	
2013	Wall Poster		
2014	1: Nenokkadine	Taxi Driver	
2014	Alludu Seenu	Bhanu Bhai	
2015	Lion	Dhooli Krishna	
2015	Soukhyam	Bavuji	
2016	Nenu Sailaja	Maharshi	
2016	Sardaar Gabbar Singh	Bhairav Singh's father	
2016	Sarrainodu	Obul Reddy	
2017	Prajapathi	Sivaji	
2017	Aakatayi	Jehangir	
2017	Katamarayudu	Radia	
2017	Jayadev	Don	
2017	Nene Raju Nene Mantri	Sarpanch	
2017	Jai Lava Kusa	Yadagiri	
2018	Achari America Yatra	Subramanyam	
2018	Naa Peru Surya	PC	
2019	Mismatch	Mahalakshmi's father	
2022	Aadavallu Meeku Johaarlu	Vasu	
2023	Waltair Veerayya	David	
2026	Gaayapadda Simham	Bhikshu Das	

|-

| 2026 || Aa Bata Aama 2 || Father || Nepali || Posthumous release

=== Hindi ===
Year	Title	Role	Notes
1985	Aitbaar	Police Inspector	
1985	Meri Jung	Rawat	
1986	Aap Ke Saath	Rajwa	Uncredited role
1986	Samundar	Navy Officer	
1987	Kaash	Man in hotel	
1987	Insaaf	Police Inspector at hospital	Uncredited role
1988	Mar Mitenge	Manjit's Henchman	
1989	Desh Ke Dushman	Rakka's goon	
1989	Hisaab Khoon Ka	Rajkumar of the princely state	
1990	Maha-Sangram	Pakya	
1990	Awaargi	Rajesh Kumar	
1990	Agneepath	Vijay's Henchman	
1990	Baaghi	Buddha	
1990	Zimmedaaar		
1990	Mera Pati Sirf Mera Hai	Gangaram	
1991	Patthar Ke Phool	Meera's first husband	
1992	Apradhi	Tejoo	
1993	Andha Intequam	Karan	
1993	Rani Aur Maharani	Police Inspector Sher Singh	
1993	Kayda Kanoon	Inspector Deshmukh	
1993	Kohra	Tinnu's henchman	
1994	Aag Aur Chingaari		
1994	Jazbaat		
1994	Insaniyat	Brijbhan's Man	
1994	Sangdil Sanam	Pradeep	
1995	Vartmaan		
1995	Policewala Gunda	Jailor Patania	
1995	Sarhad		
1996	Dushmani: A Violent Love Story		
1996	Rajkumar		
1997	Koyla	Police Commissioner DIG	
1998	Major Saab	Subiedaar Singh	
1999	Sarfarosh	Sultan	
2001	Lagaan	Deva Singh Sodhi	
2003	The Hero: Love Story of a Spy	Chief of RAW	
2004	Deewaar	Baldev	
2008	Ghajini	Ghajini Dharmatma	
2011	Shabri	Rajdhar Bhau	
2013	Grand Masti	Robert Pereira	
2015	Singh Is Bliing	Kirpal Singh	
2025	Chhaava	Yesaji Kank	

=== Tamil ===
Year	Title	Role
2005	Thotti Jaya	Seena Thana
2005	Ghajini	Lakshman / Ram (dual role)
2006	Sabari	Vajravelu
2006	Vathiyar	Nachiyar
2010	Aasal	Kali Mama (Kalivardhan)
2011	Rajapattai	Abdul Kathir (Vappa)
2012	Mirattal	Soori
2013	Haridas	Aadhi
2014	Jilla	Commissioner
2014	Veeram	Vanangamudi
2015	Aambala	Pasupathy
2015	Eli	Nagarajan
2017	Shivalinga	Baba
2017	Aayirathil Iruvar	Bhima Raju
2019	Market Raja MBBS	Manohar Singh
2022	Gulu Gulu	David
2023	DD Returns	Fernandes

=== Kannada ===
Year	Title	Role
2007	Parodi	
2008	Gaja	Soorappa
2009	Abhay	MLA Narasimha Murthy
2013	Bachchan	Minister Madhusudhan
2013	Election	Narasimha
2016	Shivalinga	Baba
2016	Lakshmana	
2022	Champion	
TBA	Thrishulam	

=== Malayalam ===
Year	Title	Role
2011	China Town	Gauda
2013	Ithu Pathiramanal	Police Constable Shouri
2014	Cousins	Nagarajan Adiga
2019	Oru Kadathu Naadan Kadha	Baba

=== Other language films ===
Year	Title	Role	Language	Notes
2000	Nightfall	Django	English	
2012	A.C.P. Ranveer	Salim Langda	Odia	
2016	Hero 420	Anukul Roy	Bengali	Indo-Bangladesh joint production
2019	Crack Fighter	Changez Khan	Bhojpuri	
2024	Hrashwo Deergha	Mahamant	Nepali	
2024	Dharmarakshak Mahaveer Chhatrapati Sambhaji Maharaj: Chapter 1	Muqarrab Khan	Marathi	
2026	Aa Bata Aama	Father	Nepali	

|-

| 2026 || Aa Bata Aama 2 || Bikram (Father) || Nepali || Posthumous release; sequel to Aa Bata Aama

== Television ==
Year	Serial	Role	Channel	Notes
1988–1990	Mahabharat	Ashwatthama	DD National	
1994	Tehkikaat	Episode 12/13 Terror Attack Conspirancy-Tiger, Sharp Shooter	DD National	
1994	Chandrakanta (TV series)	Aiyyar Himmat Singh	DD National	
1996	Yug	British Police Officer Marshall	DD National	
1999–2000	Gul Sanobar		DD National	
2002	Ssshhhh...Koi Hai	Jinnat (Episode 46 - Jinnat Ka Kahar)	Star Plus	
2003	Mission Fateh	Puneet Nath Dutt's father	Sahara One	
