= Kasko =

2009 film

- Poster
- Directed by: G. Nageswara Reddy
- Screenplay by: Sreedhar Seepana
- Produced by: A. Kodandarami Reddy; A. Bharathi; A. Sunil Reddy (presenter)
- Starring: Vaibhav; Shweta Basu Prasad
- Cinematography: Agilan
- Edited by: Praveen K. L. N. B. Srikanth
- Music by: Premgi Amaren
- Production company: K Films
- Release date: 24 December 2009
- Country: India
- Language: Telugu

Kasko is a 2009 Indian Telugu action comedy film directed by G. Nageswara Reddy. The film stars Vaibhav and Shweta Basu Prasad in the lead roles. The film was a box office failure.

== Cast ==
- Vaibhav as Vamsi / Pawan Kalyan
- Shweta Basu Prasad as RJ Krishnaveni
- Pradeep Rawat as Basavanna
- Brahmanandam as Mahesh Babu
- Salim Panda as Alauddin
- Gowri Pandit as Deepika
- Jayaprakash Reddy as J.P. (a goon)
- Chalapathi Rao as Vamsi's father
- Satyam Rajesh as Salim, Vamsi's friend
- Vajja Venkata Giridhar as Vamsi's friend
- Srinivasa Reddy as Vamsi's friend
- M. S. Narayana
- Raghu Babu
- Sravan
- Tarjan
- Azad

== Production ==
A. Kodandarami Reddy, who produced Vaibhav Reddy's previous Telugu venture Godava, is also producing this film. Shweta Basu Prasad was signed as the heroine while Brahmanandam was signed as a comedian. Tamil music director Premji Amaren, who was Vaibhav Reddy's childhood friend and acted with him in Saroja, signed this film, which marks his debut in Telugu cinema. In January 2009, the production team shot the film in BHEL, Hyderabad. Kodandarami Reddy hired a helicopter to shoot the heroine kidnapping scene.

== Soundtrack ==
The music was composed by Premgi Amaren. The audio launch was held on 18 November 2009. The guests of the function included Paruchuri Gopala Krishna, V. V. Vinayak, B. Gopal, and N. Shankar.

Song title	Singers	Length (m:s)
"Nachchavey"	Saindhavi, S. P. B. Charan	4:40
"Whistle Kottu"	Devi Sri Prasad, Surmukhi	4:30
"Dheera Gambeera"	Ranjith, SuVi	5:21
"Telusa Telusa"	Suchitra, Premgi Amaren	4:50
"Krishna Veni"	Sujatha, Naveen Madhav	5:08

== Release and reception ==
The film was scheduled to release on 4 December 2009, but the release was postponed by twenty days.

The Full Hyderabad gave the film a negative review saying that "All said and done, Kasko won't test your patience – they'll heave it out of the theatres pretty soon".
