= Jayahe =

Indian Kannada-language action drama film

- VCD cover
- Directed by: Thriller Manju
- Written by: Kamala Sarathi (dialogue)
- Screenplay by: Thriller Manju
- Story by: Thriller Manju
- Starring: Ayesha; Jai Akash; Thriller Manju
- Cinematography: Janardhan Babu
- Edited by: T. Govardhan
- Music by: M. N. Krupakar
- Production company: Cygnuss Entertainment
- Release date: 9 July 2010
- Country: India
- Language: Kannada

Jayahe is a 2010 Indian Kannada-language action drama film directed by Thriller Manju starring Ayesha in the titular role, Jai Akash and himself with Gowri Pandit and Avinash in a supporting role. The film was released to mixed reviews, but was a box office success.

== Plot ==
Jaya goes to Bangkok in search of her missing father Sushilkumar, who is a software engineer. Since the kidnappers are marital artists, she wants to learn techniques to fight them and goes to Dhrona to learn them.

== Cast ==
- Ayesha as Jaya
- Jai Akash
- Thriller Manju as Dhrona
- Gowri Pandit
- Avinash as Sushilkumar
- Ramesh Bhat
- Suryanarayana as Khan
- Ravikumar
- M H Gurumurthy Reddy
- Ramakrishna
- Killer Venkatesh
- Dombara Krishna Suresh

== Production ==
Tirupati-based Ayesha (dubbed as Lady Bruce Lee) has a black belt in karate and trained under her father Habib since she was one-year-old. Thriller Manju and Ayesha previously worked together for Shabda (2002), but this film marks her lead debut. The film was extensively shot in Coorg. There are approximately eight fights in the movie that each less than one-and-a-half minute long. She performed all of her stunts without a stunt double.

== Soundtrack ==
Jayahe

Soundtrack album by M. N. Krupakar
- Released: 2010
- Genre: Feature film soundtrack
- Length: 26:55
- Language: Kannada
- Label: Anand Audio
External audio
- Jayahe – Jukebox on YouTube

The soundtrack was composed by M. N. Krupakar with lyrics by Thriller Manju.

Track listing
No.	Title	Singer(s)	Length
1.	"Hechchu Kammi"	Sneha	4:49
2.	"Anuragada"	Sagar, Priya Yadav	4:33
3.	"Bandalu Nagini"	Krishnavaedhan Kulkarni	3:44
4.	"Cheluve"	Krupakar, Priyadarshini	5:13
5.	"Anuragada" (Pathos)	Sudhindra	4:52
6.	"Roshavesha"	Krupakar	3:44
Total length:			26:55

== Release and reception ==
The film was a box office success and the film was subsequently dubbed in other languages.

A critic from IANS rated the film 1/5 stars and wrote, "Jayahe is a badly made film. Watch it at your own risk". A critic from The New Indian Express wrote, "The movie is worth watching if you are interested in action scenes".
