= Seenu Vasanthi Lakshmi =

- Directed by: E. Srinivas
- Screenplay by: Tanikella Bharani
- Story by: Vinayan
- Based on: Vasanthiyum Lakshmiyum Pinne Njaanum (Malayalam)
- Produced by: N. M. Suresh
- Starring: R. P. Patnaik; Priya; Navaneet Kaur
- Edited by: Kotagiri Venkateswara Rao
- Music by: R. P. Patnaik
- Release date: 26 March 2004
- Country: India
- Language: Telugu

Seenu Vasanthi Lakshmi is a 2004 Telugu tragedy drama film directed by E. Srinivas. The film stars R. P. Patnaik playing the eponymous character of a blind village singer, along with Padmapriya (credited as Priya) and Navaneet Kaur in other prominent roles. The film is a remake of the 1999 Malayalam film Vasanthiyum Lakshmiyum Pinne Njaanum. The film score and soundtrack were composed by R. P. Patnaik. Although a commercial failure at the time of its release, the film has over time attained cult status, through several re-runs on television.

== Cast ==
- R. P. Patnaik as Seenu
- Priya as Vasanthi
- Navaneet Kaur as Lakshmi
- Prakash Raj as Appala Naidu
- Nutan Prasad as Danayya, Seenu's father
- Umashree as Seenu's mother
- Giri Babu as Rajanna, Seenu's uncle
- Sunil as Seenu's brother-in-law
- Brahmanandam as Classical singer
- Radhika Chaudhari as Divya
- Raghu Babu
- Vajja Venkata Giridhar
- Ali as Gopi (guest appearance in song "America Annadu")
- Tammareddy Bharadwaja as Rajugaru (in a special appearance)

== Production ==
The film was initially titled Nenu Vasanthi Lakshmi. The title was changed to Seenu Vasanthi Lakshmi after the failure of a similar titled film called Nenu Seetamahalakshmi (2003).

== Soundtrack ==
Seenu Vasanthi Lakshmi

Soundtrack album by R. P. Patnaik
- Genre: Film soundtrack
- Language: Telugu
- Producer: R. P. Patnaik

The soundtrack album was composed by R. P. Patnaik. Lyrics were penned by Kulasekhar. All the songs except one have been sung by R. P. Patnaik.

Track list
No.	Title	Singer(s)	Length
1.	"Paadana"	R. P. Patnaik, Nehal
2.	"Vana Vana"	R. P. Patnaik
3.	"Godari Navvindi"	R. P. Patnaik, Usha
4.	"America Annadu"	Malathy Lakshman, Ali, Sunil
5.	"Kodanda Ramudu"	R. P. Patnaik
6.	"Kuku Koo"	R. P. Patnaik

== Reception ==
A critic from Sify wrote that "Director E. Srinivas has faithfully adapted the original version and he has given us a stunning climax with a finesse not seen in usual Telugu cinema. Patnaik has given an extraordinarily detailed performance after doing a lot of homework. The actor has worked hard, moving one to tears, with his facial expression and body language". A critic from The Hindu wrote that "A WELL made film, which compellingly mirrors the helplessness and the subtle emotions of the visually impaired. It touches a chord somewhere within you, beseeching you to care for their travails and trauma and the pathos comes through deep and strong on the screen, impacting the viewer to mull on the subject".
