= Paadam Onnu: Oru Vilapam =

Padam Onnu: Oru Vilapam
- Directed by: T. V. Chandran
- Written by: T. V. Chandran
- Produced by: Aryadan Shoukath
- Starring: Meera Jasmine
- Cinematography: K. G. Jayan
- Edited by: Venugopal
- Music by: Johnson
- Release date: 31 October 2003
- Running time: 107 minutes
- Country: India
- Language: Malayalam

Padam Onnu: Oru Vilapam (English: Lesson One: A Wail) is a 2003 Indian Malayalam film, written and directed by T. V. Chandran. The film stars Meera Jasmine in lead role as Shahina, who won the prestigious National Film Award for Best Actress and Kerala State Film Award for Best Actress in 2003 for her performance in this movie.

== Plot ==
Razia's husband send her back to her parents, along with their baby, because her family has failed to give the promised dowry. Razia's friend, Shahina, visits her and tries to cheer her up by talking about the baby and their days at school.

Hassan Moyeen is a busy matchmaker. Economically backward families typically opt for a Mysore marriage – where they give their daughters in marriage to unknown men from the neighbouring province of Mysore. Razia's was one such marriage brokered by Hassan Moyeen. Her husband arrives seeking the remaining dowry amount, and seeks Hassan's intervention.

Shahina's mother, Saphia, makes a living by making rice dumplings and selling them at a nearby teashop.

Rasaq, an already married man with a child, is trying to leave for the Middle East in search of a job. He decides to get married again so that he can use the dowry to fund his trip. Hassan is hired to find a match for him. He impresses upon Saphia and her brother Abdu that it is time for Shahina to be married off.

Shahina reacts violently to the proposal because she wants to continue her studies. In spite of her mother's sympathy, the elders, especially the men, try to dissuade her from her studies. For them her defiance amounts to deviant behavior. Finally, Shahina is forced to give in.

Rasaq meets with repeated failure in his attempts to consummate his marriage with Shahina, because sex is something the girl cannot make sense of. His very sight provokes revulsion in her. Rasaq's first wife, Wahida, feels sorry for Shahina. On her part, Shahina takes a liking to Rasaq's daughter, Mumtaz, and the two become inseparable.

Meanwhile, Rasaq forces Wahida to administer sedatives to Shahina. While she sleeps, Rasaq forces himself upon Shahina. When she wakes up, a shocked Shahina turns hysterical in anger. Rasaq uses her behavior as a pretext to divorce her. He takes her back home where Shahina resumes her studies. On the first day of exams, she slumps on her desk. A medical examination reveals that she is pregnant. A dejected Saphia dies. Shahina is accused of adultery and ostracised.

== Cast ==
- Meera Jasmine as Shahina, Rasaq's second wife
- Irshad as Rasaq, Shahina and Wahida's husband
- Keerthana Anil as Mumtaz, Rasaq's daughter
- Mamukkoya as Hassan Moythu, a marriage broker
- Suja Karthika as Janakikutty
- Anu Joseph as Wahida, Rasaq's first wife
- M. R. Gopakumar as Abdu, Shahina's brother
- Santha Devi as Saphia, Shahina's mother
- Anamika Sivaraj as Razia, Shahina's friend
- Roslin as Rasaq's mother
- Manikandan as School Teacher
- P. Sreekumar as Hajyaru
- Salu Kuttanadu as Thangal

== Awards ==
- National Film Award
  - Best Film on Family Welfare :Aryadan Shoukath
  - Best Actress : Meera Jasmine
- Kerala State Film Awards
  - Kerala State Film Award for Second Best Film :Aryadan Shoukath
  - Kerala State Film Award for Best Actress : Meera Jasmine
  - Kerala State Film Award for Second Best Actress:Roslin
  - Kerala State Film Award for Best Story: Aryadan Shoukat
  - Kerala State Film Award for Special Jury Award: P. Sreekumar
