= Meera Jasmine =

Indian actress

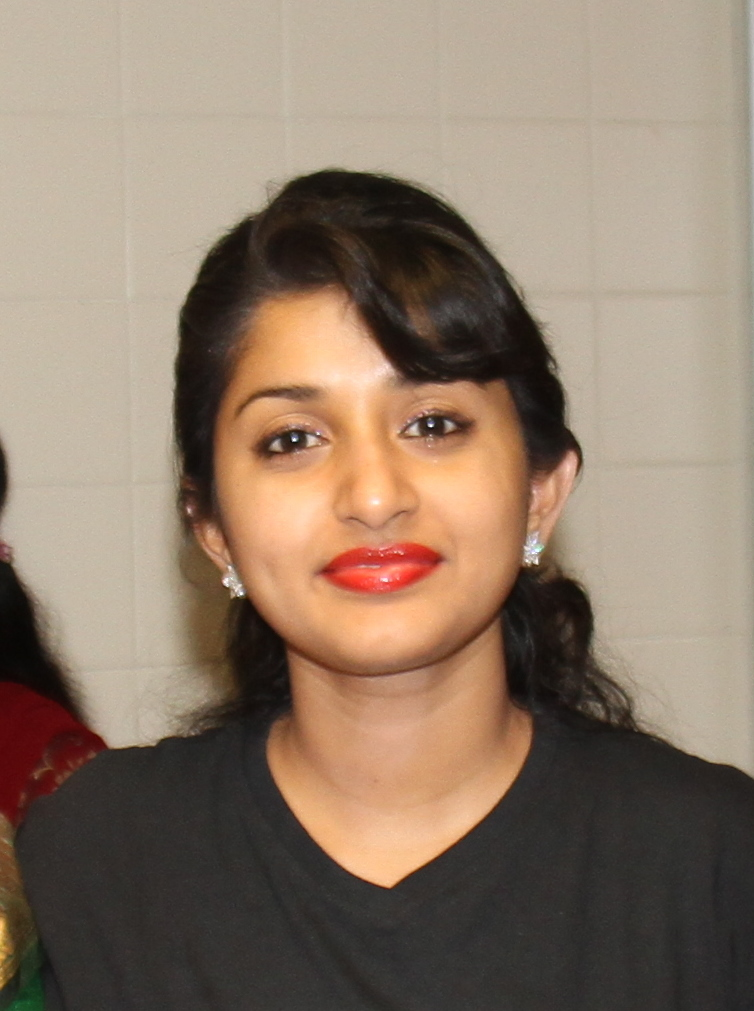
- Meera in 2011
- Born: Jasmine Mary Joseph; 15 February 1982 (age 44); Thiruvalla, Kerala, India
- Occupation: Film actress
- Years active: 2001–present
- Spouse: John Titus (m. 2014)
- Awards: National Film Award for Best Actress; Kerala State Film Award for Best Actress
- Honours: Kalaimamani (2009)

Jasmine Mary Joseph, known professionally as Meera Jasmine, is an Indian actress who appears primarily in Malayalam, Tamil, Telugu and Kannada films. Jasmine made her debut in 2001 with the Lohithadas film Soothradharan. She went on to star in various commercial and critically successful films in South Indian languages, making her one of the successful actresses of the 2000s.

She won the National Film Award for Best Actress in 2004 for her role in Paadam Onnu: Oru Vilapam, and has twice been the recipient of the Kerala State Film Award for Best Actress as well as a Tamil Nadu State Film Award Special Prize. She also received the Kalaimamani award from the Government of Tamil Nadu.

== Early life ==
Meera Jasmine was born at Kuttapuzha village of Thiruvalla in the Pathanamthitta district of Kerala to Joseph and Aleyamma. She was the fourth of their five children. She has two sisters, Jiby Sara Joseph and Jeny Susan Joseph, who has also acted in films, and two brothers.

Meera studied at Bala Vihar and then at Marthoma Residential School in Thiruvalla. Later, she enrolled for a B.Sc. in Zoology at the Assumption College, Changanassery, and completed nearly three months when she was spotted by director Blessy (who was then an assistant director to director Lohithadas) and offered a role in Soothradharan.

Meera had initially wanted to study and become a doctor and had never thought of becoming a film star. She stated, "I was just an ordinary girl. Never in my wildest dreams did I imagine being in films. I had not acted even in school plays. I never was the artistic type, I never thought I could dance, and I had not even thought of myself as being beautiful". She also said that Lohithadas "is like a father figure and my guru. He initiated me into films with Soothradharan, and I owe it all to him".

== Career ==
=== Malayalam ===
Following her Malayalam film debut in Soothradharan, Meera's second film was Gramophone, directed by Kamal, in which she appeared alongside Navya Nair and Dileep. Her role as a Jewish girl was appreciated by Malayalam critics. Her third film was Swapnakkoodu, a romantic comedy alongside Prithviraj Sukumaran, Kunchako Boban, Jayasurya, and Bhavana under director Kamal. Her performance was appreciated and the film was a high commercial success. Among the five main characters, the one who scored the most was again Meera.

She rose to fame in Malayalam cinema with the film Kasthooriman directed by her mentor Lohithadas, where she played a happy go lucky yet emotionally complex character. She received her first Filmfare award for her performance in Kasthooriman. The film was a success at the box office, running for 100 days. The same year, she acted in T. V. Chandran's acclaimed Padam Onnu Oru Vilapam. She played a 15-year-old Muslim girl who was forced to marry an older man, for which she was awarded a State Award and the National Award in addition with several other awards. It was followed by her performance as Raziya in Perumazhakkalam alongside Kavya Madhavan.

In the film Achuvinte Amma (2005), she enacted the young, adorable character Achu. She then paired with Mohanlal in Rasathanthram (2006). She played as a girl pretending to be a boy due to the pressure of circumstances in the first half of the film . The film went on to become a commercial success. Her next film with Dileep – Vinodayathra, which again was directed by Sathyan Anthikkad. She was next featured opposite Mammootty in the critically acclaimed film Ore Kadal. The film was showcased in film festivals and won awards. Her performance as an innocent middle-class woman won praise from audiences. Media quoted her as, "Matching step with the megastar in this histrionic race is Meera Jasmine, who amazes you with a stunning delineation of her difficult role" . Her next film was Calcutta News with Dileep. Blessy, who introduced her to film field, was the director of Calcutta News. More than a year later, she played the role of a playback singer in Rajeev Anchal's Paattinte Palazhy.

After a brief hiatus, she began committing films by late 2012. She was keen in choosing more women-centric roles and in Babu Janardhanan's Lisammayude Veedu, a sequel to the 2006 film Achanurangatha Veedu, her role was that of a serial rape victim. She acted opposite Mohanlal in Siddique's comedy film Ladies and Gentleman. Her latest project is Shajiyem's Ms. Lekha Tharoor Kanunnathu, a fantasy film. In 2014, she starred opposite Jayaram in Sugeeth's family film, Onnum Mindathe, but the film failed at the box office. She signed up for Ithinumappuram, a period film based in the 1970s, in which she plays a highly orthodox and rich Nair woman who falls in love with someone from a lower caste and gets married against her parents' will.

After that, she acted in the movie Mazhaneerthullikal directed by V. K. Prakash but the movie was not released. In 2016, she co-starred with Anoop Menon, Joju George and Kaniha in the crime thriller 10 Kalpanakal directed by Don Max, but the film was not a theatrical success. However, the film received rave reviews from critics and was praised for its script, direction and cast.

In 2018, Meera made a comeback after a gap of two years with a guest appearance in Kalidas Jayaram starrer Poomaram directed by Abrid Shine. After a long hiatus, in 2022 Meera joined hands with Sathyan Anthikad for a family entertainer 'Makal' alongside Jayaram. The film received decent reviews and Meera was praised for her subtle act.

=== Tamil, Telugu and Kannada ===
Meera Jasmine's Tamil debut was Run, directed by Lingusamy, which became a high success in Tamil Nadu and made her a sought-after actress. The success of Run and gave her the chance to work with the established actors of the Tamil film industry.Though her successive films did not fare as well, she was noticed by director Mani Ratnam who gave her a role in Aayutha Ezhuthu. She later appeared in N. Lingusamy's Sandakozhi and SS Stanley's Mercury Pookkal. Her latest Tamil film, Mambattiyan got released in December 2011.

Meera Jasmine became noted in the Telugu film industry with Run, the dubbed version of the same-titled Tamil film. She was seen in the Telugu films in 2004 with Ammayi Bagundi and Gudumba Shankar, also entered Kannada cinema by co-starring with Puneet Rajkumar in Maurya. Her Kannada film Arasu again with Puneet Rajkumar and Ramya was a hit. Her other Kannada films include Devaru Kotta Thangi and Ijjodu. Ijjodu, in which she played Chenni, a Basavi woman, who ends up becoming a sex worker, was screened at four prestigious domestic film festivals and garnered critical acclaim.

Meera Jasmine's biggest commercial success in Telugu remains Bhadra with Ravi Teja in the male lead. Her other Telugu films are Raraju, Maharadhi, Yamagola Malli Modalayindi, Gorintaku and Maa Ayana Chanti Pilladu, in which she is paired for a second time with Sivaji.

== Personal life ==
In 2008, she said in an interview that she will be marrying Mandolin Rajesh, "but not for the next two or three years". On 9 February 2014, Meera married Anil John Titus, who works as an engineer in Dubai.

== Controversy ==
In 2006, she offered prayers at Rajarajeshwara Temple at Taliparamba in Kerala where the entry of non-Hindus is prohibited. This led to a controversy and sparked a protest by Hindu devotees. Later, she paid ₹10,000 (US$110) as penalty to the temple authorities to conduct the purification rituals.

In 2008, she faced an unofficial ban in the Malayalam film industry issued by the Association of Malayalam Movie Artists (AMMA), after she refused to shoot for Twenty:20, a film distributed by actor Dileep for AMMA. Meera however said that she was not aware of a ban and that she was continuing shooting for Malayalam films.

== Filmography ==
Key
†	Denotes films that have not yet been released

List of Meera Jasmine film credits
Year	Title	Role	Language	Notes
2001	Soothradharan	Shivani	Malayalam	Debut
2002	Run	Priya	Tamil	Debut in Tamil cinema
2002	Bala	Aarthi	Tamil	
2003	Kasthoorimann	Priyamvada	Malayalam	
2003	Pudhiya Geethai	Sushi	Tamil	
2003	Gramophone	Jennifer/ Jenny	Malayalam	
2003	Swapnakkoodu	Kamala	Malayalam	
2003	Anjaneya	Divya	Tamil	
2003	Paadam Onnu: Oru Vilapam	Shahina	Malayalam	
2003	Joot	Meera	Tamil	
2003	Chakram	Indrani	Malayalam	
2004	Ammayi Bagundi	Janani, Satya	Telugu	Debut in Telugu cinema
2004	Aayutha Ezhuthu	Sasi	Tamil	
2004	Maurya	Alamelu	Kannada	Debut in Kannada cinema
2004	Gudumba Shankar	Gowri	Telugu	
2004	Perumazhakkalam	Raziya	Malayalam	
2005	Achuvinte Amma	Ashwathy/ Achu	Malayalam	
2005	Bhadra	Anu	Telugu	
2005	Kasthuri Maan	Uma	Tamil	
2005	Sandakozhi	Hema	Tamil	
2006	Mercury Pookkal	Anbu Chelvi	Tamil	
2006	Rasathanthram	Kanmani/ Velayuthankutty	Malayalam	
2006	Raraju	Jyothi	Telugu	
2007	Arasu	Aishu	Kannada	
2007	Maharadhi	Kalyani	Telugu	
2007	Thirumagan	Ayyakka	Tamil	
2007	Vinodayathra	Anupama/ Anu	Malayalam	
2007	Parattai Engira Azhagu Sundaram	Shweta	Tamil	
2007	Yamagola Malli Modalayindi	Aishwarya	Telugu	
2007	Ore Kadal	Deepti	Malayalam	
2008	Calcutta News	Krishnapriya	Malayalam	
2008	Innathe Chintha Vishayam	Kamala	Malayalam	
2008	Nepali	Priya	Tamil	
2008	Minnaminnikoottam	Charulatha/ Charu	Malayalam	
2008	Rathri Mazha	Meera	Malayalam	
2008	Gorintaku	Lakshmi	Telugu	
2008	Maa Ayana Chanti Pilladu	Rajeswari	Telugu	
2009	Mariyadhai	Chandra	Tamil	
2009	Bangaru Babu	Meera	Telugu	
2009	A Aa E Ee	Kalyani Chandram	Telugu	
2009	Devaru Kotta Thangi	Lakshmi	Kannada	
2010	Aakasa Ramanna	Tara	Telugu	
2010	Sivappu Mazhai	Samyuktha	Tamil	
2010	Ijjodu	Chenni	Kannada	
2010	Pen Singam	Meghala	Tamil	
2010	Hoo	Jasmine	Kannada	
2010	Paattinte Palazhy	Veena	Malayalam	
2010	Four Friends	Gowri	Malayalam	
2011	Ilaignan	Meera	Tamil	
2011	Mohabbat	Sajna	Malayalam	
2011	Mambattiyan	Kannaathal	Tamil	
2012	Aathi Narayana	Laila	Tamil	
2013	Lisammayude Veedu	Lisamma	Malayalam	
2013	Ladies and Gentleman	Aswathy/Achu	Malayalam	
2013	Moksha	Moksha	Telugu	
2013	Ms Lekha Tharoor Kaanunnathu	Lekha	Malayalam	
2014	Inga Enna Solluthu	Rajeshwari	Tamil	
2014	Vingyani	Kaveri	Tamil	
2014	Onnum Mindathe	Syama	Malayalam	
2015	Ithinumappuram	Rukmini	Malayalam	
2016	Pathu Kalpanakal	Shazia Akbar	Malayalam	
2018	Poomaram	Herself	Malayalam	Cameo
2022	Makal	Juliet	Malayalam	
2023	Vimanam	Shwetha	Telugu	Cameo
2023	Queen Elizabeth	Elizabeth Angel Simon	Malayalam	
2024	Paalum Pazhavum	Sumi	Malayalam	
2024	Swag	Uthphalaa Devi / Revathi	Telugu	Dual role
2025	Test	Padma Arjun	Tamil	Netflix Original
2025	Hridayapoorvam	Anonymous woman	Malayalam	Cameo
2026	Athimanoharam †	Naicy	Malayalam	Post-Production
2026	Yours Sincerely Ram †	TBA	Kannada	Filming

== Awards and honours ==
List of Meera Jasmine awards and honours
Year	Award	Award Category	Awarded Work	Ref.
2004	National Film Awards	Best Actress	Paadam Onnu: Oru Vilapam	
2004	Kerala State Film Awards	Best Actress	Paadam Onnu: Oru Vilapam, Kasthuri Maan	
2007	Kerala State Film Awards	Best Actress	Ore Kadal	
2005	Tamil Nadu State Film Awards	Tamil Nadu State Film Award Special Prize	Kasthuri Maan	
2009	Tamil Nadu Government Honour	Kalaimamani	Art - Various movies in Tamil Cinema Industry	
2005	Kerala Film Critics Association Awards	Best Actress	Paadam Onnu: Oru Vilapam	
2006	Filmfare Awards South	Filmfare Award for Best Actress	Achuvinte Amma	
2007	Filmfare Awards South	Filmfare Award for Best Actress	Kasthoorimann	
2008	Filmfare Awards South	Filmfare Award for Best Actress	Ore Kadal	
2003	Asianet Film Awards	Best Actress Award	Paadam Onnu: Oru Vilapam	
2004	Asianet Film Awards	Best Actress Award	Perumazhakkalam	
2005	Asianet Film Awards	Best Actress Award	Achuvinte Amma	
2007	Asianet Film Awards	Best Actress Award	Ore Kadal	
2004	Vanitha Film Awards	Vanitha-Chandrika Film Award For Best Actress	Perumazhakkalam	
2007	Vanitha Film Awards	Vanitha-Nipon Paint Film Award for Best Actress	Ore Kadal	
2007	V. Shantaram Awards	V Shantaram Award for Best Actress	Ore Kadal	
2001	Bharathan Award	Best Female Debut Actor	Soothradharan	
2002	Dinakaran Award	Best Female Debut	Run	
2005	Thikkurissi Award	Best Actress	Perumazhakkalam	
2007	Srividya Puraskaaram	Best Actress	Ore Kadal	
2008	Amrita TV Film Awards	Best Actress	Ore Kadal	
