= Aakasa Ramanna =

- Poster
- Directed by: G. Ashok
- Screenplay by: G. Ashok
- Story by: G. Ashok
- Produced by: Manyam Ramesh
- Starring: Allari Naresh; Sivaji; Rajiv Kanakala; Meera Jasmine; Gowri Pandit
- Cinematography: Sai Sriram
- Edited by: Prawin Pudi
- Music by: Chakri
- Production company: Manyam Entertainments
- Release date: 12 March 2010
- Country: India
- Language: Telugu

Aakasa Ramanna is a 2010 Indian Telugu-language black comedy film which is a remake of 2003 American film, 11:14. This film is directed by G. Ashok, produced by Manyam Ramesh under the Manyam Entertainments banner, and stars Allari Naresh, Sivaji, Rajiv Kanakala, Meera Jasmine, and Gowri Pandit in the lead roles. The soundtrack was composed by Chakri and cinematography was handled by Sai Sriram. The dialogues for the film were written by Chandrashekar Gundimeda while screenplay was handled also by G. Ashok. This was G. Ashok's second film as director. It marked the debut of editor Prawin Pudi. The film was released on 12 March 2010.

== Plot ==
Akasa Ramanna, the narrator, starts with the story of Teja (Rajiv Kanakala), Raana (Allari Naresh), and Jai (Sivaji). The story also involves P. Timothy (Venu Madhav) and his lecherous friends. Raana is in search of getting credit of five lakh rupees to help his girlfriend, Isha (Gowri Pandit). He seeks his friend and supermarket owner Jai's help. Jai himself being in a financial crisis cannot help Raana. He is arrested by Inspector Ali (Rao Ramesh). Two murders happen to spice up the story. Isha killed in a car accident. Ali suspects Teja of the murders. Teja is introduced to the concept of the inescapable trap of 'karma' by a fake godman Swamiji (Raghu Babu), in the local bar. In some minutes, the 'godman' is punished with death by 'karma,'. At the other end of the spectrum are Raana and Jai, who are taken for a ride by a treacherous woman. Raana is in dire need of money, while Jai mysteriously needs the same amount. Timothy and the gang are on their way to spend the night with their favorite prostitute. Meanwhile, Teja hits a person while driving the car in a drunken state There is a terrible link between the two, and the story rocks back and forth within a 40-minute duration leading to revealing the suspense. The entire film runs around just seven characters and is based on an incident that takes place at 12:40.

== Cast ==
- Allari Naresh as Raana
- Sivaji as Jai
- Rajiv Kanakala as Teja
- Meera Jasmine as Tara
- Gowri Pandit as Isha
- Venu Madhav as P. Timothy
- Rao Ramesh as Inspector Ali
- Naga Babu as Isha's father
- Sana as Isha's mother
- Raghu Babu as Swamiji
- Srinivasa Reddy as K.K.
- Satyam Rajesh as Yadav
- M. S. Narayana as Dr. Ekalingam
- Khayyum as Swamiji's assistant
- Venu as Swamiji's assistant
- Geetha Singh as Maggie
- Banda Jyothi as Banda Jyothi

== Production ==
=== Casting ===
The lead actors in the film, Allari Naresh and Sivaji, had previously worked together in the 2008 film Pelli Kaani Prasad. After his unsuccessful debut as a director with the film Flash News, G. Ashok made his comeback with this film. This was Allari Naresh's third release in the year. Apart from Naresh and Sivaji, Rajiv Kanakala plays another important role in the film. Meera Jasmine is cast for the role of Tara and Gowri Pandit for the role of Isha. The film revolves around seven main characters and features prominent Telugu actors, like Venu Madhav, Khayyum, Venu, and Srinivas Reddy. Chandrashekar assisted Ashok with the dialogues in the film. Before release, the director disclosed that the film was made with the ‘reverse screenplay’ technique meaning the climax is shown first and the film then follows. The entire film runs around just seven characters and is based on an incident that takes place at 12.40. The filming began in October 2008 and was completed in mid-2009. The film was delayed and was finally released on 12 March 2010. The shooting was predominantly done at nights as the story happens within a time span of 40 minutes. The main plot was taken from the 2003 Canadian film 11:14.

== Soundtrack ==
Aakasa Ramanna

Soundtrack album by Chakri
- Released: 24 November 2010
- Genre: Film soundtrack
- Producer: Chakri

The album consists of two songs, both written by lyricist Anantha Sreeram. The soundtrack was composed by music director Chakri.

No.	Title	Artist(s)	Length
1.	"Yememi Kaavaali Maakippude"	Sai Sivani	5:03
2.	"Ramanna Ramanna Aakasaramana"	Vasu	4:28

== Release and reception ==
Aakasa Ramanna was released in India on 12 March 2010. The film received negative reviews. Deepa Garimella of fullhyderbad gave a 3 out of 10 rating for the film. Reviewer from Indiaglitz gave a mixed review for the film and said that Aakasa Ramanna is watchable but as a suspense flick the film fails. Radhika Rajamani from Rediff.com gave the film 1.5 out of 5 and said that Aakasa Ramanna falters in execution. The film was a commercial failure at the box-office.
