= G. Ashok =

Indian film director

- Born: Tenali, Andhra Pradesh, India
- Occupations: Film director; screenwriter
- Years active: 2007–present
- Spouse: Vijaya Lakshmi (m. 2009)
- Children: 3

G. Ashok is an Indian film director and screenwriter who works predominantly in Telugu cinema and Hindi cinema Ashok made his directorial debut Ushodayam (2007) which won him Nandi Award for Best Children's Film Director. He went on to direct films such as Aakasa Ramanna, Pilla Zamindar, Sukumarudu, Chitrangada, and Bhaagamathie.

== Personal life ==
G. Ashok was born in Tenali, Andhra Pradesh. He married Vijaya in 2009, and the couple has three children.

== Career ==
He is a classical dancer and good at 13 various Indian classical dances. T Krishna cast him in Repati Pourulu when he was 6 years old. Later, he worked as a child artist in 15 films. He made his debut as a dance assistant in 1997 and worked for over 300 songs as a choreographer and dance assistant. He has worked under dance masters like DKS Babu, Swarnalatha, Lawrence and Raju Sundaram. He worked for films like Master, Annamayya, Pelli, Osey Ramulamma and Jeans. Director Bala was his roommate when he was in Chennai.

He received a Nandi Award for Best Director for a Children's Film for his directorial debut Ushodayam (2007).

In 2010, he directed Aakasa Ramanna, starring Allari Naresh. In 2011, he directed Pilla Zamindar with Nani and Haripriya on the lead. In 2013, he directed Sukumarudu with Aadi and Nisha Agarwal. He is best known for his work on Bhaagamathie (2018) with Anushka Shetty.

== Filmography ==
Year	Film	Language	Notes	Ref.
2007	Ushodayam	Telugu	Nandi Award for Best Children's Film Director - won	
2010	Aakasa Ramanna	Telugu		
2011	Pilla Zamindar	Telugu		
2013	Sukumarudu	Telugu		
2017	Chitrangada	Telugu		
2018	Bhaagamathie	Telugu; Tamil	Simultaneously shot in Tamil	
2020	Durgamati	Hindi	Remake of Bhaagamathie	
2024	Kuch Khattaa Ho Jaay	Hindi		
2025	Ufff Yeh Siyapaa	Sound		
