= 55th Filmfare Awards South =

Award ceremony for South Indian films

- Date: 12 July 2008
- Site: Chennai, India

Highlights
- Most awards: Happy Days (Telugu) (6 awards); Paruthiveeran (Tamil) (6 awards)

The 55th Filmfare Awards South ceremony honouring the winners and nominees of the best of South Indian cinema in 2007 is an event that was held at Jawaharlal Nehru Indoor Stadium, Chennai on 12 July 2008.

== Main awards ==
Winners are listed first, highlighted in boldface.

=== Kannada cinema ===
Best Film	Best Director
**Aa Dinagalu**	**K. M. Chaitanya – Aa Dinagalu**
Best Actor	Best Actress
**Duniya Vijay – Duniya**; Puneeth Rajkumar – Milana	**Rashmi – Duniya**; Parvathy Thiruvothu – Milana
Best Supporting Actor	Best Supporting Actress
**Sharath Lohitashwa – Aa Dinagalu**	**Tara – Ee Bandhana**
Best Music Director	Best Lyricist
**Mano Murthy – Milana**	**V. Manohar – Pallakki**
Best Male Playback Singer	Best Female Playback Singer
**Sonu Nigam – Milana** ("Ninnindale")	**Nanditha – Duniya** ("Kariya I Love You")

=== Malayalam cinema ===
Best Film	Best Director
**Katha Parayumbol**	**Babu Thiruvalla – Thaniye**
Best Actor	Best Actress
**Mohanlal – Paradesi**	**Meera Jasmine – Ore Kadal**
Best Supporting Actor	Best Supporting Actress
**Sai Kumar – Anandabhairavi**	**Lakshmi Gopalaswamy – Paradesi**
Best Music Director	Best Lyricist
**Ouseppachan – Ore Kadal**	**Anil Panachooran – Arabikkatha**
Best Male Playback Singer	Best Female Playback Singer
**Madhu Balakrishnan – Rock & Roll**	**Swetha Mohan – Ore Kadal**

=== Tamil cinema ===
Best Film	Best Director
**Paruthiveeran**; Billa; Mozhi; Pokkiri; Sivaji	**Ameer Sultan – Paruthiveeran**; Prabhu Deva – Pokkiri; Radha Mohan – Mozhi; S. Shankar – Sivaji; Vetrimaran – Polladhavan
Best Actor	Best Actress
**Karthi – Paruthiveeran**; Ajith Kumar – Billa; Rajinikanth – Sivaji; Sathyaraj – Onbadhu Roobai Nottu; Vijay – Pokkiri	**Priyamani – Paruthiveeran**; Archana – Onbadhu Roobai Nottu; Asin – Pokkiri; Jyothika – Mozhi; Nayantara – Billa; Tamannaah Bhatia – Kalloori
Best Supporting Actor	Best Supporting Actress
**Saravanan – Paruthiveeran**	**Sujatha – Paruthiveeran**
Best Music Director	Best Lyricist
**A. R. Rahman – Sivaji**	**Pa. Vijay – Unnale Unnale** ("Unnale Unnale")
Best Male Playback Singer	Best Female Playback Singer
**S. P. Balasubrahmanyam – Mozhi** ("Kannal Pesum")	**Sadhana Sargam – Kireedam** ("Akkam Pakkam"); Darshana KT – Azhagiya Thamizh Magan **("Maduraikku Pogathadee")**

=== Telugu cinema ===
Best Film	Best Director
**Happy Days**; Dhee; Desamuduru; Tulasi; Yamadonga	**Sekhar Kammula – Happy Days**; Puri Jagannadh – Desamuduru; S.S. Rajamouli – Yamadonga; Sreenu Vaitla – Dhee; Tulasiram – Mantra
Best Actor	Best Actress
**N. T. Rama Rao Jr. – Yamadonga**; Allu Arjun – Desamuduru; Rajendra Prasad – Mee Sreyobhilashi; Srikanth – Operation Duryodhana; Venkatesh – Aadavari Matalaku Ardhalu Verule	**Trisha – Aadavari Matalaku Ardhalu Verule**; Bhoomika Chawla – Anasuya; Charmy Kaur – Mantra; Genelia D'Souza – Dhee; Nayantara – Tulasi
Best Supporting Actor	Best Supporting Actress
**Jagapati Babu – Lakshyam**; Mohan Babu – Yamadonga; Rahul Haridas – Happy Days; Ravi Babu – Anasuya; Srihari – Dhee	**Sonia Deepti – Happy Days**; Gayatri Rao – Happy Days; Kalyani – Lakshyam; Mamta Mohandas – Yamadonga; Sindhu Menon – Chandamama
Best Music Director	Best Lyricist
**Mickey J. Meyer – Happy Days**; Chakri – Desamuduru; Harris Jayaraj – Munna; M. M. Keeravani – Yamadonga; Yuvan Shankar Raja – Aadavari Matalaku Ardhalu Verule	**Vanamali – Happy Days** ("Arere Arere")
Best Male Playback Singer	Best Female Playback Singer
**Karthik – Happy Days** ("Arere Arere")	**Sadhana Sargam – Munna** ("Manasa")

== Technical awards ==
Best Choreography: Prem Rakshith – Azhagiya Tamil Magan	Best Cinematography: K. V. Anand – Sivaji	Best Art Director: Thotta Tharani – Sivaji

== Special awards ==
Lifetime Achievement: Sivakumar; Jayapradha	Best Male Debut – South: Ram Charan Teja – Chirutha	Best Female Debut – South: Hansika Motwani – Desamuduru; Anjali – Kattradhu Thamizh
