= 52nd Filmfare Awards South =

Award ceremony for South Indian films

- Date: 23 July 2005
- Site: Gachibowli Stadium, Hyderabad, India

The 52nd Filmfare Awards South ceremony honouring the winners and nominees of the best of South Indian cinema in films released in 2004 was an event held at the Gachibowli Stadium, Hyderabad on 23 July 2005.

== Main awards ==
Winners are listed first, highlighted in boldface.

=== Kannada cinema ===
Best Film	Best Director
**Apthamitra**	**P. Vasu – Apthamitra**
Best Actor	Best Actress
**Vishnuvardhan – Apthamitra**	**Soundarya – Apthamitra**
Best Music Director
**Gurukiran – Apthamitra**

=== Malayalam cinema ===
Best Film	Best Director
**Kazhcha**	**Blessy – Kazhcha**
Best Actor	Best Actress
**Mammootty – Kazhcha**	**Geetu Mohandas – Akale**
Best Music Director
**M. Jayachandran – Perumazhakkalam**

=== Tamil cinema ===
Best Film	Best Director
**Autograph**	**Cheran – Autograph**
Best Actor	Best Actress
**Suriya – Perazhagan**	**Sandhya – Kadhal**
Best Supporting Actor	Best Supporting Actress
**R. Madhavan – Aayitha Ezhuthu**	**Mallika – Autograph**
Best Comedian	Best Villain
**Vivek – Perazhagan**	**Prakash Raj – Ghilli**
Best Music Director
**Yuvan Shankar Raja – 7G Rainbow Colony** **Bharadwaj – Autograph**

=== Telugu cinema ===
Best Film	Best Director
**Varsham**; Anand; Aa Naluguru; Arya	**Sukumar – Arya**; Sekhar Kammula – Anand; S. S. Rajamouli – Sye; Sobhan – Varsham; K. Vijaya Bhaskar – Malliswari
Best Actor	Best Actress
**Chiranjeevi – Shankar Dada MBBS**; Rajendra Prasad – Aa Naluguru; Prabhas – Varsham; Allu Arjun – Arya; Nagarjuna – Mass	**Trisha – Varsham**; Kamilini Mukherjee – Anand; Jyothika – Mass; Shriya Saran – Nenunnanu; Katrina Kaif – Malliswari
Best Supporting Actor	Best Supporting Actress
**Srikanth – Shankar Dada MBBS**; Kota Srinivasa Rao – Aa Naluguru; Sunil – Mass; Shashank – Sye	**Keerthi Reddy – Arjun**; Satya Krishnan – Anand; Aamani – Aa Naluguru; Charmy Kaur – Mass
Best Comedian	Best Villain
**Sunil – Pedababu**; Venu Madhav – Sye; Dharmavarapu Subramanyam – Leela Mahal Center; Dharmavarapu Subramanyam – Yagnam	**Pradeep Rawat – Sye**; Gopichand - Varsham; Devaraj – Yagnam; Prakash Raj – Samba
Best Music Director
**Devi Sri Prasad – Varsham**; Devi Sri Prasad – Arya; K. M. Radha Krishnan – Anand; Koti – Malliswari; Harris Jayaraj – Gharshana

== Technical Awards ==
Best Choreography: Raju Sundaram – from Ghilli	Best Cinematography: S. Gopal Reddy – Varsham

== Special awards ==
Lifetime Achievement: K. R. Vijaya; Ramoji Rao	Filmfare Award for Best Male Debut - South: Ravi Krishna - 7G Rainbow Colony	Best Female Playback Singer: K. S. Chithra - Varsham
