= Filmfare Award for Best Supporting Actress – Telugu =

Indian annual film award

Filmfare Awards for Best Supporting Actress – Telugu
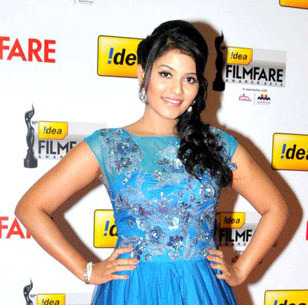
- The 2024 recipient: Anjali
- Awarded for: Best performance by an Actress in a supporting role in Telugu films
- Country: India
- Presented by: Filmfare
- First award: 2002
- Currently held by: Anjali for Gangs of Godavari (2024)

Highlights
- Most wins: Ramya Krishna (3)
- Website: http://filmfareawards.indiatimes.com/

The Filmfare Award for Best Supporting Actress Award – Telugu is given by the Filmfare magazine as part of its annual Filmfare Awards for Telugu films in India. The award was introduced and first given at the 50th Filmfare Awards South in 2002.

== Winners ==
Year (Note: Indicates the year of the film's release)	Actress	Film	Role	Ref.
2024	Anjali	Gangs of Godavari	Rathnamala	
2023	Rupa Lakshmi	Balagam	Lakshmi	
2022	Nandita Das	Virata Parvam	Shakuntala	
2020 / 21	Tabu	Ala Vaikunthapurramuloo	Yashoda	
2019	AWARDS FUNCTION WAS SUSPENDED DUE TO COVID-19 PANDEMIC			
2018	Anasuya Bharadwaj	Rangasthalam	Rangamma Attha	
2017	Ramya Krishna	Baahubali: The Conclusion	Sivagami Devi	
2016	Nandita Swetha	Ekkadiki Pothavu Chinnavada	Parvathi/Amala	
2015	Ramya Krishna	Baahubali: The Beginning	Sivagami Devi	
2014	Lakshmi Manchu	Chandamama Kathalu	Lisa Smith	
2013	Lakshmi Manchu	Gundello Godari	Chitra	
2012	Amala	Life Is Beautiful	Mother	
2011	Annie	Rajanna	Mallamma	
2010	Abhinaya	Shambo Shiva Shambo	Pavithra	
2009	Ramya Krishna	Konchem Ishtam Konchem Kashtam	Rajyalakshmi	
2008	Jayasudha	Kotha Bangaru Lokam	Mother	
2007	Sonia Deepti	Happy Days	Sravanthi	
2006	Sandhya	Annavaram	Varalakshmi/Varam	
2005	Neha Oberoi	Balu ABCDEFG	Indira Priya Dharshini/Indu	
2004	Keerthi Reddy	Arjun	Meenakshi	
2003	Jayasudha	Amma Nanna O Tamila Ammayi	Lakshmi	
2002	Sangeetha	Khadgam	Seetha Mahalakshmi	

== Nominations ==
- 2024: Anjali as Rathnamala – Gangs of Godavari
  - Faria Abdullah as Nidhi – Mathu Vadalara 2
  - Rashi Singh as Vaidehi – Prasanna Vadanam
  - Sharanya Pradeep as Padma – Ambajipeta Marriage Band
  - Shraddha Srinath as Apsara / Maya – Mechanic Rocky
  - Varalaxmi Sarathkumar as Anjamma – Hanu-Man
- 2023: Rupa Lakshmi as Lakshmi – Balagam
  - Ramya Krishna as Raju Garu – Ranga Maarthaanda
  - Rohini as Saraswati – Writer Padmabhushan
  - Shyamala as Savitri – Virupaksha
  - Sreeleela as Vijayalakshmi – Bhagavanth Kesari
  - Sriya Reddy as Radha Rama – Salaar: Part 1 – Ceasefire
  - Swathi Reddy as Lekha – Month of Madhu
- 2022: Nandita Das as Shakuntala – Virata Parvam
  - Amala Akkineni – Oke Oka Jeevitham
  - Priyamani as Bharathakka – Virata Parvam
  - Rashmika Mandanna as Afreen / Waheeda – Sita Ramam
  - Sangeetha as Neelam – Masooda
  - Sobhita Dhulipala as Pramoda Reddy – Major
- 2020–2021: Tabu as Yashoda – Ala Vaikunthapurramuloo
  - Madonna Sebastian as Lawyer Padmavathi – Shyam Singha Roy
  - Priyanka Jawalkar as Zara – Gamanam
  - Ramya Krishna as 'Visakha' Vani – Republic
  - Sharanya Pradeep as Subhashini – Jaanu
  - Vijayashanti as Bharathi – Sarileru Neekevvaru
- 2018: Anasuya Bharadwaj as Rangamma Attha – Rangasthalam
  - Asha Sarath as Vaishnavi Natarajan – Bhaagamathie
  - Malavika Nair as Sisira Bharadwaj – Taxiwaala
  - Mehreen Pirzada as Lavanya – Kavacham
  - Praveena Parachuri as Saleema – C/o Kancharapalem
  - Samantha Akkineni as Madhuravani – Mahanati
- 2017: Ramya Krishna as Shivagami Matha – Baahubali 2: The Conclusion
  - Bhumika Chawla as RTO Jyothi – Middle Class Abbayi
  - Catherine Tresa as Devika Rani – Nene Raju Nene Mantri
  - Jayasudha as Janakamma – Sathamanam Bhavati
  - Sharanya Pradeep as Renuka – Fidaa
- 2016: Nandita Swetha – Ekkadiki Pothavu Chinnavada
  - Anasuya as ACP Jaya – Kshanam
  - Anupama Parameswaran as Nagavalli – A Aa
  - Priyamani as Susheela – Mana Oori Ramayanam
  - Ramya Krishna as Satyabhama – Soggade Chinni Nayana
- 2015: Ramya Krishna as Queen Shivagami – Baahubali: The Beginning
  - Kriti Kharbanda as Kavya – Bruce Lee – The Fighter
  - Pavitra Lokesh as Parvathi – Malli Malli Idi Rani Roju
  - Revathi as Lakshmi Murali – Loafer
  - Sukrithi as Bhavana – Kerintha
- 2014: Lakshmi Manchu as Lisa Smith – Chandamama Kathalu
  - Jayasudha as Lakshmi – Rowdy
  - Karthika Nair as Maha Lakshmi/Lucky – Brother of Bommali
  - Nadhiya as IG Geetha – Drushyam
  - Shriya Saran Dr. Anjali and Rama lakshmi – Manam
- 2013: Lakshmi Manchu as Chitra – Gundello Godari
  - Anjali as Sita – Seethamma Vakitlo Sirimalle Chettu
  - Nadhiya as Sunanda – Attarintiki Daredi
  - Pranitha Subhash as Pramila – Attarintiki Daredi
  - Punarnavi Bhupalam as Sunitha – Uyyala Jampala
- 2012: Amala – Life Is Beautiful
  - Chinmayi Ghatrazu – Lovely
  - Kovai Sarala – Sudigadu
  - Saloni Aswani – Bodyguard
- 2011: Baby Annie – Rajanna
  - Aksha Pardasany – Kandireega
  - Lakshmi Manchu – Anaganaga O Dheerudu
  - Poonam Kaur – Gaganam
  - Taapsee Pannu – Mr. Perfect
- 2010: Abhinaya – Shambo Shiva Shambo
  - Ramya Krishna – Ranga The Donga
  - Roja – Golimaar
  - Saranya Ponvannan – Puli
  - Suhasini Maniratnam – Leader
- 2009: Ramya Krishna – Konchem Ishtam Konchem Kashtam
  - Kalpika Ganesh – Prayanam
  - Lakshmi – Eenadu
  - Manorama – Arundhati
  - Namitha – Billa
- 2008: Jayasudha – Kotha Bangaru Lokam
  - Meera Jasmine – Gorintaku
  - Parvati Melton – Jalsa
  - Poonam Kaur – Souryam
  - Tabu – Pandurangadu
- 2007: Sonia Deepti – Happy Days
  - Gayatri Rao – Happy Days
  - Kalyani – Lakshyam
  - Mamta Mohandas – Yamadonga
  - Sindhu Menon – Chandamama
- 2006: Sandhya – Annavaram
  - Charmy Kaur – Rakhi
  - Jayasudha – Bommarillu
  - Jayasudha – Style
- 2005: Neha Oberoi – Balu ABCDEFG
  - Anushka Shetty – Super
  - Bhanupriya – Chhatrapati
  - Sangeetha – Sankranti
  - Veda Sastry – Nuvvostanante Nenoddantana
- 2004: Keerthi Reddy – Arjun
  - Aamani – Aa Naluguru
  - Charmy Kaur – Mass
  - Satya Krishnan – Anand
- 2003: Jayasudha – Amma Nanna O Tamila Ammayi
  - Kalyani – Vasantam
  - Sindhu Tolani – Aithe
  - Talluri Rameshwari – Nijam
- 2002: Sangeetha – Khadgam
  - Anshu – Manmadhudu
  - Bhanupriya – Lahiri Lahiri Lahirilo
  - Gracy Singh – Santosham

== Superlatives ==
Superlative	Actor	Record
Actress with most awards	Ramya Krishna	3
Actress with most nominations	Jayasudha	6
Actress with most nominations without a win	Bhanupriya; Nadhiya Priyamani	2
Actress with most nominations in a single year	Jayasudha	2 (2006)
Oldest winner	Jayasudha	51 years
Oldest nominee	Jayasudha	60 years
Youngest winner	Baby Annie	10 years
Youngest nominee	Baby Annie	10 years

- Sivagami Devi is the only character to win most Best Supporting Actress awards. Ramya Krishna won for portraying the character in both Baahubali: The Beginning and Baahubali: The Conclusion, respectively in 2015 and in 2017.

== See also ==
- Filmfare Award for Best Supporting Actor – Telugu
