= Avakai Biryani =

- Promotional poster for the film
- Directed by: Anish Kuruvilla
- Written by: Anish Kuruvilla
- Produced by: Sekhar Kammula
- Starring: Kamal Kamaraju; Bindu Madhavi
- Cinematography: Shamdat Sainudeen
- Edited by: Praveen Boyina
- Music by: Manikanth Kadri
- Production company: Amigoes Creations Pvt Ltd
- Distributed by: Amigoes Creations Pvt Ltd
- Release date: 14 November 2008
- Running time: 140 minutes
- Country: India
- Language: Telugu

Avakai Biryani (transl. Mango Pickle - Biryani) is a 2008 Telugu-language film written and directed by Anish Kuruvilla. The film stars debutants Kamal Kamaraju and Bindu Madhavi as the lead pair. It revolves around Akbar Kalam, a Muslim auto rickshaw-driver and Lakshmi Jandhyala, a traditional Hindu woman with a romantic backdrop.

== Plot ==
Avakai Biryani (Pickeled Biryani) is a coming of age story of two individuals from two completely different backgrounds and cultural upbringing. The only similarity between them is the fact that they both belong to the same picturesque, historic town of Devarakonda, about 100 km from Hyderabad.

Akbar, an orphan Muslim is an auto driver, whose days are all about lugging passengers from one town to another on the highway. But driving an auto is not all he wants to do. He wants more in life. His goal is to pass his final year B.com examinations, something he has failed to do now three times in a row.

Lakshmi, a traditional Brahmin girl, resettled with her family in Devarakonda, having been displaced from Polavaram. Her family used to traditionally run a hotel over there for many years. Her aim now is to be able to open up a hotel on the highway near Devarakonda and make it a success. She also takes a lot of pride in the avakai (mango pickle) she makes and has big plans of selling them in Hyderabad.

While these central characters go about their goals, the town of Devarakonda itself has a lot of things going on: the village panchayat which seldom takes care of its own people, a thriving 7 seater auto business run corruptly, with the conspirators in this case being two influential people in the town.

Akbar and Lakshmi become friends after first being apprehensive about each other's faiths and backgrounds. They respect each other's dreams and ambitions, which much later turns into a mature loving relationship.

The goings on in the town compel Akbar to take a stand on certain issues. He becomes an accidental hero, but what happens to his relationship with Lakshmi? How much further can it go? Her father is uncompromising in his attitude towards Muslims. The couple takes a decision.

== Cast ==
- Kamal Kamaraju as Akbar Kalam
- Bindu Madhavi as Lakshmi Jandhyala (Voice dubbed by Sunitha Upadrashta)
- Rao Ramesh as Masterji
- Kameshwar Rao as Purushottam
- Bhel Prasad as Akbar's father
- Varun Jonnada as Babbar
- Rakhe as Lakshmi's mother
- Praneeth as Sondu
- Durgesh as Pasha
- Mary Vijaya as Lakshmi a.k.a. Nanamma
- Rajan Palnati as CM
- Charvi as Kavitha
- Srivinay Sridhar as Bujji

== Soundtrack ==
Music was composed by Manikanth Kadri. Music was released on Aditya Music company.

1. "Nannu Choopagala Adham" – Karthik, Swetha
2. "Veerudena" – Shreya Ghoshal, Karthik
3. "Nadiche Yedu Adugullo" – Chithra, Naresh Iyer
4. "Chindesi Chinna Pedda" – Ranjith, Rahul Nambiar, Tippu
5. "Maamidi Kommaki" – Manikanth Kadri, Saindhavi
6. "Adigadigo" – Karthik

== Production ==
Anish Kuruvilla previously assisted Nagesh Kukunoor in Rockford. At that time, Sekhar Kammula cast Kuruvilla for Dollar Dreams, Kammula's maiden directorial venture. Kuruvilla also assisted Kammula in the direction. Their relationship continued with the rest of Kammula's films – Anand (2004), Godavari (2006) and Happy Days (2007). It was only after the latter film, that Kuruvilla found himself ready to direct feature films. Though Kuruvilla had directed a film titled Naa Video Diary in 2007, Avakai Biryani was his first feature film.

Having the story ready, Kuruvilla narrated it to Kammula shortly after the release of Happy Days. Kammula liked the "nobility in the story" and asked him to expand it further. Kuruvilla was not only unsure about his story finding acceptance with Kammula, but also about the film's commercial success. In a special interview conducted by Kammula, Kuruvilla said:

"When I narrated the story to you, I expected 50/50 chance of you accepting the film. There are some elements that appeal to your sensibilities and some elements are unique to me. The avakai girl character will be liked by you. But there are some elements which might not be liked by you. Lucky, you liked the soul of the story. Another apprehension I had was the audience's expectations. They come to theaters expecting a Sekhar Kammula’s movie."

Kammula gave him the freedom to select the cast and crew for the film. After Kammula was satisfied with the third draft of the script, he did not involve himself with the rest of the filmmaking. Kuruvilla revealed that the script was a result of two years of his research. Having worked with Kammula before, Kuruvilla found his influence in his use of natural dialogues, characterization of the female protagonist and the taste of music.

Madanapalle born Bindu Madhavi was a model for sarees, jewelry and other consumer products. When she received the offer for the lead role, she accepted it right away after realizing that it involved Kammula and Kuruvilla. This film marked her debut as a mainstream actress.
