= Kamal Kamaraju =

Indian actor

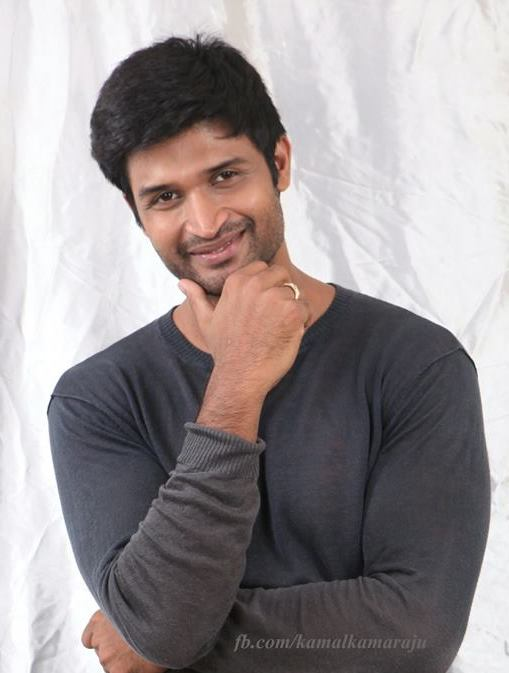
- Born: Kamal Kamaraju; 3 September 1981 (age 45); Sevagram, Maharashtra, India
- Education: Jawaharlal Nehru Architecture and Fine Arts University
- Occupations: Actor; writer
- Years active: 2005–present
- Spouse: Supriya Biswas (m. 2013)

Kamal Kamaraju is an Indian actor and screenwriter known for his works in Telugu cinema and theatre.

== Early and personal life ==
Kamaraju was born on 3 September 1981 in Sevagram, Maharashtra in a Telugu family to Jawaharlal Kamaraju and Nirmala Gutta. His father retired as an AGM in Navratna Company NMDC and his mother took voluntary retirement from state organization Markfed. Both hail from Hyderabad where they brought up Kamal and his elder brother, actor Kranthi Kiran.

Kamal was named after his paternal grandmother, Kamala Devi, who hails from Razole in East Godavari district. His maternal grandparents were freedom fighters and were particular that their daughter give birth in renowned Gandhian surroundings.

Kamal studied at Little Flower High School in Hyderabad, where he picked up interest in art, theatre and dance. This later on led to his joining architecture from the JNTU–School of Planning and Architecture (now Jawaharlal Nehru Architecture and Fine Arts University), Hyderabad where he earned his bachelor's degree in architecture.

On 6 October 2013, Kamal got engaged to Supriya Biswas and the two got married on 13 December 2013.

== Career ==
Kamal started his career as an assistant art director to director Chandra Sekhar Yeleti under the tutelage of renowned art director Ravinder for the film Anukokunda Oka Roju (2005). He got his first opportunity as an actor in Chhatrapati (2005) while working as associate art director for the same film under director S. S. Rajamouli. However, he was most recognised for his role in Sekhar Kammula's Godavari (2006). He then paired up with Kuruvilla to do an independent film called Confessions of a Film Actor (2007) which was one of the first films to be released online as a pay-per-view and became an instant hit overseas.

He was later launched as a lead actor by Kammula who produced the well acclaimed Avakai Biryani (2008) directed by Anish Kuruvilla. This led him to doing lead roles in other films like Kalavaramaye Madilo (2009) and Virodhi (2011). He also ventured into Tamil films with Ayiram Vilakku (2010) under the direction of Hosimin where he played a negative role.

== Filmography ==
=== Film ===
==== As actor ====
Year	Title	Role	Notes
2005	Anukokunda Oka Roju	Kamal	
2005	Chatrapati	Shivaji's friend	
2006	Godavari	Ravindra "Ravi" Bommireddy	
2007	Confessions of a Film maker	Kamal Kamaraju	
2008	Avakai Biryani	Akbar Kalam	
2008	Jalsa	Indu's husband	
2009	Kalavaramaye Madilo		
2010	Aayiram Vilakku	Dilli	Tamil film
2011	Virodhi	Hari	
2013	Aravind 2	Rishi	
2014	Legend	Jitendra's son	
2015	Ladies & Gentlemen	Anand	
2016	Araku Road Lo		
2017	Katamarayudu	Katamarayudu's younger brother	
2017	Arjun Reddy	Gautham Reddy	
2017	Kutumba Katha Chitram	Watchman	
2018	LAW – Love and War	Vikram	
2018	Mithai	Siddharth	
2018	Tharuvata Evaru		
2019	Maharshi	Ajay	
2020	Maa Vintha Gadha Vinuma	Karthik Venugopal	
2020	Miss India	Arjun Chaitanya	
2021	Vakeel Saab	Anwar	
2021	Natyam	Hari Babu	
2023	Virupaksha	Venkata Chalapathy	
2023	Ahimsa	Police inspector	
2023	Miss Shetty Mr Polishetty	Raghu Rayudu	
2024	Bhimaa	Srikanth IPS	
2024	Mix Up	Abhay	
2025	Thalli Manasu	Janakiram	
2025	Vallan	Joel	Tamil film
2025	Dear Uma	Surya	
2025	Drive	Ishan	
2025	Divya Drusthi		
2026	Ustaad Bhagat Singh	Officer Kamal	
2026	Mahendragiri Varahi	Rajeev	

==== Other crew positions ====
Year	Title	Role	Notes
2005	Chatrapati	Assistant art director	
2005	Anukokunda Oka Roju	Assistant art director	
2007	I am Famous	Dialogue writer	

=== Television ===
Year	Title	Role(s)	Network	Language(s)
2023	Dayaa	Kaushik Naidu	Disney+ Hotstar	Telugu

=== Theatre ===
- 2011 – "who is afraid of Virginia Woolf"

=== Art Show ===
- 2012 – My Name is Minnu
- 2015 – Rani
