= Mr. Work from Home =

2026 Indian Telugu-language film

- Theatrical release poster
- Directed by: Madhudeep Chelikaani
- Written by: Madhudeep Chelikaani
- Produced by: Aravind Mandem
- Starring: Thrigun; Payal Radhakrishna
- Cinematography: Ravi Kumar V
- Edited by: Kotagiri Venkateswara Rao
- Music by: Arun Chiluveru; Prakash Cherukuri
- Production company: Lotus Creative Works
- Release date: 15 May 2026
- Running time: 130 minutes
- Country: India
- Language: Telugu

Mr. Work from Home is a 2026 Indian Telugu-language film written and directed by Madhudeep Chelikaani and produced by Aravind Mandem under the banner Lotus Creative Works. The film stars Thrigun and Payal Radhakrishna in the lead roles alongside Anish Kuruvilla and others in supporting roles.

== Premise ==
The story revolves around a young man who continues his professional work remotely while returning to his village, where he explores agriculture and attempts to modernise farming practices. The narrative highlights the relationship between contemporary work culture and traditional rural livelihoods.

== Cast ==
- Thrigun as Arvind
- Payal Radhakrishna as Mahi
- Anish Kuruvilla as Prasad
- Sivaji Raja as Balaram Chakravarthi
- Harsha Vardhan
- Satya Krishnan as Shyamala
- Harsha Chemudu as Harsha
- Sudharshan
- Gundu Sudarshan
- Venu Yeldandi
- Saptagiri
- Giridhar
- Sarayu
- Sattipandu

== Production ==
The film is written and directed by Madhudeep Chelikaani and produced by Aravind Mandem, with CH.V.S.N. Babji presenting the project under the banner Lotus Creative Works.

== Music ==
The music for the film is composed by Arun Chiluveru and Prakash Cherukuri. The film includes a track rendered by Baba Sehgal.
