= Life Is Beautiful (2012 film) =

2012 Indian film by Sekhar Kammula

- DVD Cover
- Directed by: Sekhar Kammula
- Written by: Sekhar Kammula
- Produced by: Sekhar Kammula; Chandrasekhar Kammula
- Starring: Abijeet; Sudhakar Komakula; Kaushik Darbha; Shagun Kaur; Shriya Saran; Zara Shah; Vijay Deverakonda; Naveen Polishetty; Anjala Zaveri
- Cinematography: Vijay C. Kumar
- Edited by: Marthand K. Venkatesh
- Music by: Mickey J Meyer
- Production company: Amigos Creations
- Distributed by: Ficus (Overseas)
- Release date: 14 September 2012
- Running time: 169 minutes
- Country: India
- Language: Telugu

Life Is Beautiful is a 2012 Indian Telugu-language coming-of-age drama film written and directed by Sekhar Kammula. The film features five debutante actors, Abijeet, Sudhakar Komakula, Kaushik Darbha, Shagun Kaur, and Zara Shah, in lead roles with Shriya Saran, Anjala Zaveri and Amala Akkineni in key supporting roles. The film also features Vijay Deverakonda, Sree Vishnu, and Naveen Polisetty. The film is produced by Sekhar and Chandrasekhar Kammula under Amigos Creations banner. The soundtrack of the film was composed by Mickey J. Meyer and the cinematography was handled by Vijay C. Kumar. The film received both mixed to positive reviews from critics and audiences with appreciation for the director's work.

== Plot ==
Srinu and his sisters, Satya and Chinni, relocate to Hyderabad and move in with their relatives in advance of their widowed mother's job change, where they are welcomed and befriended by Paddu, their wealthy cousin, Abhi, a nerdy college student, Nagaraj, an unemployed youth, and Lakshmi, another newcomer and Nagaraj's crush. Their neighborhood B Phase is in litigation against Gold Phase, a more luxurious rival counterpart striving to seize a shared lake between them.

The community rivalry often takes shape in Srinu, Nagaraj, and Abhi's altercations with Gold Phase's arrogant residents Rakesh, Suresh, and Ajay. Tensions between the areas rise dramatically when Srinu's cousin Ashok and Rakesh's sister Sony are found to be romantically involved. After Rakesh threatens Srinu, the couple elope to Ashok's parents house and get married. Infuriated, Sony's parents and other Gold Phase elites set out to retaliate by orchestrating legal battles for the lake as well as utility and maintenance problems across B Phase. Although they try to remain resilient, the conflicts with Gold Phase take a toll on the friends.

Nagaraj's sloppy lifestyle catches up to him when Lakshmi rejects his proposal and his father evicts him. Abhi develops a crush on Paru, a Gold Phase belle, and briefly dates her. However, Paru soon breaks up with him fearing retaliation from her community, and he quickly moves on. Satya gradually loses motivation to complete her degree and flunks. Paddu's snobby mother discovers her with Srinu, and vehemently forbids their relationship. Hostilities with Gold Phase escalate again when Ajay molests Lakshmi and later culminate in a brawl between the factions.

Seeking comfort and guidance, Srinu confides in his uncle and prepares to visit his mother. However, Srinu's uncle reveals that his mother is ill with cancer and is denying treatment to save funds for Srinu, Satya, and Chinni's future. Moved by their mother's concern and sacrifice for them, Srinu and Satya find new inspiration and focus on their education again. Srinu earns a lucrative job and confronts Paddu's parents to persuade them. With help from his neighbors, Nagaraj finds an opportunity to start a taxi business and later wins Lakshmi's heart as well. Srinu, Satya, and Chinni eventually reunite with their mother after she makes a full recovery and decide to remain in B Phase.

== Cast ==
- Abijeet as Srinivas "Srinu"
- Sudhakar Komakula as Nagaraj
- Kaushik Darbha as Abhijit "Abhi"
- Shagun Kaur as Padmavati "Paddu"
- Zara Shah as Lakshmi
- Rashmi Shastry as Sathya
- Kavya as Vandana "Chinni"
- Naveen Polishetty as Rakesh
- Vijay Deverakonda as Ajay
- Shriya Saran as Parvati "Paru" (Voice dubbed by Sunitha)
- Sree Vishnu as Ashok
- Sreemukhi as Sonia
- Anjala Zaveri as Maya
- Amala Akkineni as Lakshmi
- C. V. L. Narasimha Rao as Ashok's father and Srinu's uncle
- Surekha Vani as "Dabbulatthaya", Paddu's mother and Srinu's maternal aunt
- Rajasekhar Sanku as Paru's father
- Charan Akula as Manish, Sathya's boyfriend
- Akshay Neelakantham as Maya's SMS friend
- Appaji Ambarisha Darbha as Paddu's arranged proposal groom's father
- Sanjeev
- Sriram
- Eesha Rebba as Harini, Srinu's aunt.
- Tejaswi Madivada (special appearance in "Life is Beautiful" song)

== Production ==
In August 2010, media reports emerged that Sekhar Kammula registered the title Life Is Beautiful at the film chamber and would make the movie with Varun Sandesh. Seven months after his movie Leader was released, Sekhar officially announced that his next project was titled Life Is Beautiful and would star newcomers. On 3 September 2010, he announced a star hunt in association with Vodafone India and Radio Mirchi that would help him find the lead actors for the movie. In April 2011, it was announced that after almost 8 months of auditions and casting, the lead cast was finalized. After multiple delays, filming finally began in June 2011. In February 2012, it was reported that one of the film's lead actress walked out of the project after shooting for almost six months. It was reported that Shriya Saran was cast in the film to replace the actor. Singer Sunitha Upadrashta who has given voice to most of Shekar's earlier films had provide her voice to actress Shriya Saran. It was announced that a gated community set worth ₹1 crore was built under the supervision of art director Thotta Tharani. In May 2012, it was reported that the filming was finally completed. On 6 July 2012, a press meet was held in Hyderabad where the cast was introduced and the first look of the film was launched. During an interview it was revealed that the director approached actress Sai Pallavi for the lead role but she eventually refused the offer to pursue her medical degree in Georgia .

== Soundtrack ==
Life Is Beautiful

Soundtrack album by Mickey J. Meyer
- Released: 27 July 2012
- Recorded: 2012
- Genre: Film soundtrack
- Length: 31:57
- Label: Aditya Music
- Producer: Mickey J. Meyer

Mickey J. Meyer chronology
Anaganaga O Dheerudu (2011)	Life Is Beautiful (2012)	Routine Love Story (2012)

The soundtrack of the film was composed by Mickey J Meyer. Mickey previously worked with Sekhar for Happy Days and Leader. The audio of the film was released on 27 July 2012 at Marriott Hotel in Hyderabad through Aditya Music label. Lyrics for the songs were penned by Anantha Sreeram and Vanamali. The music premier of the album was held at Radio Mirchi where the songs were played for the first time for public hearing.

Track-List
No.	Title	Lyrics	Artist(s)	Length
1.	"Life Is Beautiful"	Ananta Sriram	KK	05:21
2.	"Beautiful Girl"	Vanamali	Karthik	04:40
3.	"Atu Itu Ooguthu"	Ananta Sriram	Sreeram Chandra	05:28
4.	"Its Your Love"	Ananta Sriram	Naresh Iyer	05:08
5.	"Amma Ani Kothaga"	Vanamali	Shashikiran, Sravana Bhargavi	05:47
6.	"Life Is Beautiful Pop"	Ananta Sriram	Sreeram Chandra	05:34
Total length:				31:57

== Release ==
Although initial reports suggested that the film would release in early 2012, delays in filming and production pushed back the film release. In July 2012, it was announced that the film would release in August. The film was released worldwide on 14 September 2012 with premier shows in USA on 13 September.

=== Pre-release revenues ===
In October 2011, it was announced that Ficus Inc had acquired the overseas theatrical distribution rights of the film. It was reported that the satellite rights of the film were sold to MAA TV for ₹3.5 crore.

=== Critical reception ===
The film received mixed to positive reviews from critics and audiences, many critics compared the film to Sekhar's directional previous Telugu critically acclaimed film Happy Days. DNA India wrote:"Sekhar Kammula has delivered again with Life is Beautiful. Yes, the film is a bit too long and there are many scenes that could have been edited out or even shot better – but all said and done... the three-hour long tale leaves you smiling, gushing and crying at several intervals. You leave the theatre feeling better about the world and thankful for the smallest joys in life – which we think is more than what Sekhar Kammula could have asked for". CNN-IBN wrote:"The plot lacked continuity and was heading in different directions before finally arriving at a cliched climax". Idlebrain wrote:"The plus points are Sekhar’s trade mark beautiful moments, casting, dialogues, direction and a strong mother sentiment. On the flip side, a better background music and shorter runtime would have helped the film further. On a whole, Life is Beautiful is a good movie".

== Awards ==
Ceremony	Category	Nominee	Result
60th Filmfare Awards South	Best Actor in a Supporting Role – Female	Amala Akkineni	Won
CineMAA Awards	Best Outstanding Actress	Amala Akkineni	Won
2nd South Indian International Movie Awards	Best Lyricist	Vanamali for "Amma Ani Kothaga"	Nominated
2nd South Indian International Movie Awards	Best Female Debutant	Gurshagun Kaur Sachdeva	Nominated
