= Virodhi (2011 film) =

- Poster
- Directed by: Neelakanta
- Written by: Neelakanta
- Produced by: Anil Meka
- Starring: Srikanth; Kamalinee Mukherjee; Ajay; Kamal Kamaraju
- Cinematography: H. M. Ramchandra
- Edited by: Shankar Suri
- Music by: R. P. Patnaik
- Production company: Meka Media
- Release date: 1 July 2011
- Country: India
- Language: Telugu

Virodhi is a 2011 Telugu-language film directed by Neelakanta. The film stars Srikanth, Kamalinee Mukherjee, Ajay and Kamal Kamaraju in pivotal roles. The film was showcased among the Indian panorama section, at the 2011 International Film Festival of India. The film won two Nandi Awards. The film was later dubbed in Hindi as Apradh Ke Aatank in 2013 by Goldmines Telefilms.

== Plot ==
Political journalist Jayadev (Srikanth) unearths several scams made by a politician (Ahuti Prasad) who in turn invites him to bribe him. The idealistic Jayadev refuses to relent, and as they discuss, a group of Naxals attack the politician and kill him off while Jayadev is taken hostage. Along with Jayadev, the group of Maoists led by Gogi (Ajay) head to their base camp in a dense forest. During the journey, their ideologies are tested; good and bad are exposed, in a dramatic way.

== Cast ==
- Srikanth as Jayadev
- Kamalinee Mukherjee as Sunitha
- Ajay as Gogi
- Kamal Kamaraju as Hari
- Kiran Varanasi as Ganesh
- Sri Ramya as Myna
- Vijayachander
- Ravi Varma as Lakshman
- Sivaji Raja
- Ahuti Prasad as Political Leader
- Nagineedu as Commissioner
- Moinuddin Mohammed as Karthik, Assistant Commissioner of Police
- Rathna Shekar Reddy as Police Officer

== Soundtrack ==
- "Adivamma Vesinadi"
- "Edi Cheekati Edi Veluturu"

== Reception ==
A critic from The Times of India rated the film 3.5 out of 5 and wrote that "A far cry from all the commercial fare that is being doled out these days, “Virodhi” is an intelligent flick. Neelakantha is the true star of this movie for his efforts to pull of something like this". Jeevi of Idlebrain.com opined that "Director Neelakanta who has come up with engaging screenplay for films like Show and Missamma couldn’t handle in this film with interesting screenplay".

== Awards ==
Nandi Awards

- Third Best Feature Film - Bronze - Anil Meka
- Best Dialogue Writer - Neelakanta
