= Fear (2024 film) =

2024 Indian Telugu-language film by Haritha Gogineni

- Theatrical release poster
- Directed by: Haritha Gogineni
- Written by: Haritha Gogineni
- Produced by: AR Abhi; Vanki Penchalaiah
- Starring: Vedhika; Arvind Krishna
- Cinematography: I. Andrew
- Edited by: Haritha Gogineni
- Music by: Anup Rubens
- Production company: Dattatreya Media
- Release date: 14 December 2024
- Country: India
- Language: Telugu

Fear is a 2024 Indian Telugu-language psychological thriller film written and directed by Haritha Gogineni. The film features Vedhika and Arvind Krishna in lead roles.

The film was released on 14 December 2024.

== Synopsis ==
Sindhu is a cheerful and composed young woman in love with her boyfriend, Sampath. When he relocates for work, Sindhu encounters strange and eerie incidents. She feels like someone stalks her but struggles to identify who or what it might be. Is Sindhu indeed being followed, or is it all in her mind? What's really happening to her? Does she experience any childhood trauma? These questions form the crux of the story.

== Cast ==
- Vedhika in dual roles as:
  - Sindhu
  - Indu
- Arvind Krishna as Sampath
- Sahithi Dasari
- Jayaprakash
- Pavitra Lokesh
- Anish Kuruvilla
- Sayaji Shinde
- Satya Krishnan
- Appaji Ambarisha Darbha
- Shani Salmon
- Meka Ramakrishna

== Production ==
The film was officially launched and the muhurat shot was done in January 2024.

== Music ==
The background score and soundtrack is composed by Anup Rubens. The audio rights were acquired by Madhura Audio.

All lyrics are written by Krishna Kanth; all music is composed by Anup Rubens.

Track list
No.	Title	Singer(s)	Length
1.	"Mabbullo Thega Vugelaa"	Laxmi Sravani Chitta	3:46
2.	"Fear Title Song"	Megna, Neil Krithan	3:14

== Release ==
Fear was released on 14 December 2024.

== Reception ==
Richa Barua of Asianet News gave a rating of 2.75 out of 5, praising the direction and the screenplay. Sakshi Post too gave the same rating echoing the same about direction, story and acting performances. On the website New Indian Express the film has a review with a rating of 2/5.
