= Vijay C. Kumar =

Indian choreographer

- Born: C. Vijay Kumar; Andhra Pradesh, India
- Occupation: Cinematographer
- Father: C. Nageswara Rao

Vijay C. Kumar is an Indian cinematographer, who works in the Telugu cinema. Some of his notable films include Vivaha Bhojanambu (1988), Ammoru (1995), Aagraham (1991), Dollar Dreams (2000), Anand (2004) and Happy Days (2007). He won the Nandi Award for Best Cinematographer for the film Godavari (2006).

== Background ==
C. Vijay Kumar's father, C. Nageswara Rao, was a famous cinematographer, who worked for classics like Pandava Vanavasam, Paramanandayya Sishyula Katha, Gudi Gantalu, Aastulu - Anthastulu, and Aradhana. Unfortunately Nageswara Rao expired at the age of 42, when Vijay Kumar was only seven years old. As his mother, C. Sanadhana, wanted him to carry on in his father's footsteps and continue in the same profession, he joined Sarada Enterprises (currently known as Anand Cine Services) outdoor unit at the age of thirteen as an apprentice. His son, Pawan Ch, was a protégé of A. R. Rahman and made his debut as a music director with Love Story (2021).

== Career ==
Vijay Kumar worked under various cinematographers like S. Venkataratnam, V. S. R. Swamy, Ravikant Nagaich, S. S. Lal, and S. Gopal Reddy in Telugu. He worked with Shomandar Roy, Eshaan Arya, Baba Azmi, and Behran Mukherjee in Hindi for eight years and earned a lot of practical knowledge in different kinds of lightning and exposures. In 1984, he joined as an operative cameraman under Lok Singh, for Vijetha (1985). Producer Jaya Krishna gave Vijay Kumar his first break as cinematographer with Vivaha Bhojanambu (1988) film under Jandhyala, which was a blockbuster hit. He later went out to work for Neeku Naaku Pellanta with the same team.

Producer Shyam Prasad Reddy offered him to do unfinished work of Ankusam (1989), even though the official cinematographer was K. S. Hari. He worked for Agraham and Ammoru (1995), which went on to be path-breaking Telugu films, in terms of technical work. Later on, he went on to work many successful films like Bachelors, Sampangi, Sreevarante Mavare and Jai Bhajaranga Bhali.

He met Sekhar Kammula when they worked for Dollar Dreams which was the first film in their collaboration, following which, they worked together for all of his films: Anand (2004), Godavari (2006), Happy Days (2007), Leader (2010), Life is Beautiful (2012), Anaamika (2014), Fidaa (2017), and Love Story (2021).

== Filmography ==
- Vivaha Bhojanambu (1988)
- Neeku Naaku Pellanta (1988)
- Ankusam (1989)
- Aagraham (1991)
- Ammoru (1995)
- Jai Bhajaranga Bhali (1997)
- Sreevarante Mavare (1998)
- Prema Pallaki (1998)
- All Rounder (1998)
- Velugu Needalu (1999)
- Dollar Dreams (2000)
- Bachelors (2000)
- Seenu (2000; Tamil)
- College (2000)
- Sampangi (2001)
- Dil (2003)
- Seshadri Naidu (2004)
- Anand (2004)
- Andhrudu (2005)
- Godavari (2006)
- Samanyudu (2006)
- Sri Mahalakshmi (2007)
- Happy Days (2007)
- Victory (2008)
- Current (2009)
- Leader (2010)
- Life is Beautiful (2012)
- Anaamika (2014; Telugu & Tamil bilingual)
- Fidaa (2017)
- Balakrishnudu (2017)
- Aatagallu (2018)
- Nartanasala (2018)
- Love Story (2021)
- Raajahyogam (2022)

== Awards ==
- Nandi Award for Best Cinematographer - Godavari
