= Vanamali =

Telugu lyricist

- Born: Manigopal; 19 May 1968 (age 58); Chittoor, Andhra Pradesh, India
- Occupations: Poet, Lyricist, Songwriter, Reporter
- Spouse: Vishnupriya
- Children: 2

Manigopal, popularly known by his pen name, Vanamali, is an Indian lyricist and poet who works in Telugu cinema. He is the recipient of the Filmfare Award for Best Lyricist – Telugu. He holds a PhD in Telugu literature from Madras University.

== Background ==
Dr. Manigopal was born in Chittoor in Andhra Pradesh. His mother tongue is Tamil. He is always interested in many arts, particularly singing. He took up writing seriously while he was in his degree final year. He never had any ambitions of taking up any form of art seriously and it was the emphasis of his parents on education right from the childhood that made him a voracious reader and motivated him to go ahead with education. Vanamaali has earned his Ph.D. with High Honours in Telugu literature. He wrote his first composition which was sung by Vijayalaksmi Sarma in a program in Doordarshan. After that he joined as a reporter in Sitara, a Telugu film weekly & Eenadu daily and worked there for almost 13 years. During this time he developed his interest in Telugu movies and is one of the leading lyricists and songwriters in Tollywood. He has worked with musical maestros such as Harris Jayaraj, A. R. Rahman and Ilaiyaraaja.

== Filmography ==
=== As lyricist ===
| Year | Film | Songs | Notes |
|---|---|---|---|
| 1999 | Time (D) | "Naa Siggu Tamboolala", Uyyala Pandagochindi, Premenantara, Kanulake Teliyani, Manchu Mutyame | |
| 2004 | Sivaputrudu | All songs | Telugu-dubbed version of Pithamagan |
| 2007 | Happy Days | All songs | |
| 2008 | Avakai Biryani | All songs | |
| 2009 | Oy! | "Waiting For You", "Anukoledenadu", "Povadhe Prema" | |
| 2009 | Arya 2 | "Karige Loga", "Karige Loga (D-Plugged)" | |
| 2010 | Maro Charitra | "Premaney Peray", "Ninnu Nannu" | |
| 2010 | Prasthanam | "Nee Rendallo", "Innalluga", "Naayudochaadoe", "Murali Lola" | |
| 2010 | Gaayam 2 | "Kalagane Kannullo" | |
| 2010 | Thakita Thakita | "Ishq Hai Yeh" | |
| 2010 | Robo (D) | "Neelo Valapu", "Harima Harima" | |
| 2010 | Orange | "Chilipiga", "Nenu Nuvvantu", "O'Range", "Rooba Rooba", "Ye Vaipuga" | |
| 2011 | Ko | "Aga Naga" | Tamil film; wrote Telugu portions of song |
| 2011 | Rangam (D) | All songs (Telugu version) | Dubbed version of Ko |
| 2011 | 180 | All songs | |
| 2012 | Roudram (D) | | |
| 2012 | Life Is Beautiful | "Beautiful Girl", "Amma Ani Kothaga" | Telugu dubbed version of Rowthiram |
| 2012 | Ninnu Choosthe Love Vasthundi | All songs except "Bathing at Cannes" | Telugu dubbed version of Engeyum Kadhal |
| 2013 | Kadali | All songs | Telugu dubbed version of Kadal |
| 2013 | NH4 | | Telugu dubbed version of NH4 |
| 2013 | Kaalicharan | | |
| 2014 | DK Bose | "Padipoya" | |
| 2014 | Manam | "Kanulanu Thaake" | |
| 2014 | Karthikeya | "Saripovu" | |
| 2015 | Nene | | |
| 2016 | Premalayam (D) | "Randi Babu Randi", "Aye Kanya Guram", "Arjunuda", "Chaulunya,"Vandhanam" | Telugu dubbed version of Kaaviya Thalaivan |
| 2017 | Kaadhali | All songs | |
| 2017 | Fidaa | "Hey Pillagaada", "Hey Mister" | |
| 2019 | Majili | "Ye Manishike Majili o" | |
| 2019 | Bandobast | "Hey Amigo" | Telugu dubbed version of Kaappaan |
| 2019 | Oorantha Anukuntunnaru | "Kanna", "Kanna (Reprise)" | |
| 2021 | Kapatadhaari | "Kalalo Kanupaape", ''Hayaki Baby'' | |
| 2021 | Kaadan | All songs | Tamil film |
| 2021 | Aranya | All songs | |
| 2021 | Devarakondalo Vijay Premakatha | "Idhem Nyayame" | |
| 2022 | ET | All songs | Telugu dubbed version of Etharkkum Thunindhavan |
| 2024 | Rakshana | "Rakshana Title Track" | |
| 2024 | Mr. Bachchan | "Jikki" | |
| 2024 | Thangalaan | "Thandora Moothalatho" | |
| 2024 | Lucky Baskhar (D) | "Lucky Baskhar Title Track" | Tamil dubbed version; co-written with Balaji Venugopal |
| 2025 | 8 Vasantalu | All songs | |
| 2025 | Champion | "Kalaga Kadhaga" | |
| 2026 | Sathi Leelavathi | "Chittoor Pilla", "Madhuram", "Veluthunna Veluthunna" | |

=== As dialogue writer ===
- Aranya (2020)
- Clap (2022)
- Star (D) (2024)

== Awards ==
| Year | Award | Category | Film | Song | Result |
|---|---|---|---|---|---|
| 2007 | Nandi Awards | Best Lyricist | Happy Days | "Oh My Friend" | Won |
| 2007 | Filmfare Awards South | Best Lyricist – Telugu | Happy Days | "Arare Arare" | Won |
| 2010 | Filmfare Awards South | Best Lyricist – Telugu | Arya 2 | "Karige Loga" | Nominated |
| 2011 | Filmfare Awards South | Best Lyricist – Telugu | Orange | "Nenu Nuvantu" | Nominated |
| 2012 | South Indian International Movie Awards | Best Lyricist (Telugu) | Life Is Beautiful | "Amma Ani Kothaga" | Nominated |
| 2013 | Filmfare Awards | Best Lyricist – Telugu | Life Is Beautiful | "Amma Ani Kothaga" | Nominated |
| 2014 | Filmfare Awards South | Best Lyricist – Telugu | Manam | "Kanulanu Thake" | Nominated |
| 2014 | Filmfare Awards South | Best Lyricist – Telugu | Karthikeya | "Saripovu Koti" | Nominated |
