= Sonia Deepti =

Indian actress

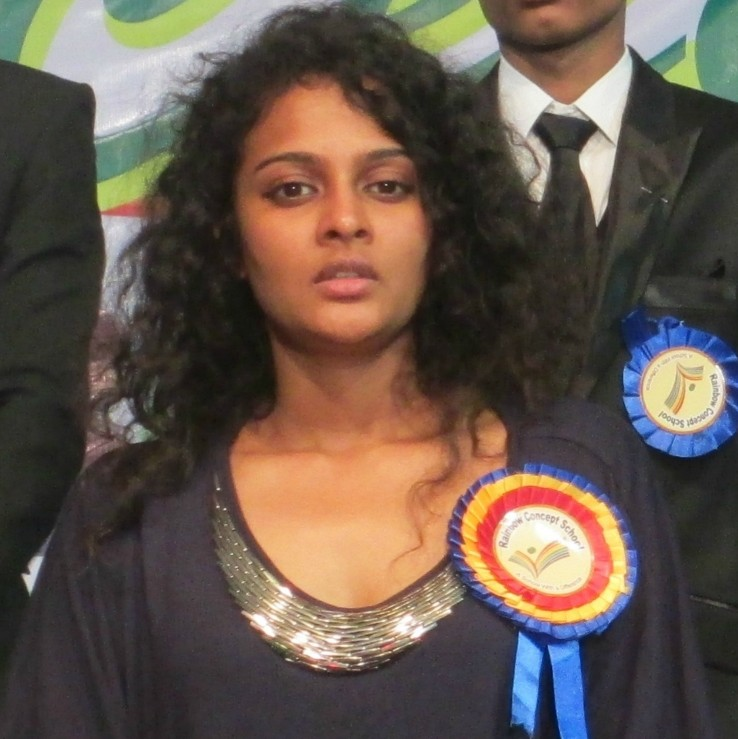
- Deepti in 2018
- Born: 29 July 1983 (age 43); Hyderabad, Andhra Pradesh, India
- Occupation: Actress
- Years active: 2007–present

Sonia Deepti (born 29 July 1983) is an Indian actress who has primarily appeared in Telugu films. Her debut performance in the 2007, Sekhar Kammula film, Happy Days won her the Filmfare Award for Best Supporting Actress – Telugu.

== Career ==
Sonia Deepti was born and brought up in Hyderabad, Telangana. After finishing her studies with a degree in computer applications, she worked as a software engineer in an IT company for three years, before stepping into acting. At an event, she was spotted by Sekhar Kammula, who gave her an acting offer, after seeing her performance in an audition. Accepting the offer, she made her acting debut in the 2007 Telugu film Happy Days, enacting the role of Shravs. The film, upon release, became a blockbuster and won six awards at the 2008 Filmfare Awards South, one of which was the Award for Best Supporting Actress for Sonia for her performance that won her critical acclaim.

In late 2008, her second film Vinayakudu opposite Krishnudu, one of her co-actors in Happy Days, was released, which went on to become a successful venture as well. She soon got offers from the Tamil film industry as well and made her debut in Tamil with the N. Lingusamy-directed romantic-action film Paiyaa in 2010. That year she had another Tamil film releasing, Inidhu Inidhu, a remake of Happy Days, in which she reprised her role from the original. Sonia played the role of Samantha's character's friend in the 2011 Telugu film Dookudu.

She made her debut in Kannada with the film Ninnindale starring Puneeth Rajkumar and Erica Fernandes, which was released in January 2014.

On the eve of International Women's Day in 2015, she released a short film on her YouTube channel. Scripted by Megha Wali, this film questions legality and legitimacy of moral policing. It was well received on social media and appreciated by many stars including Ram Gopal Varma and Amitabh Bachchan. It was shot at Country Club in Hyderabad.

== Filmography ==
=== Feature films ===
Year	Film	Role	Language	Notes
2007	Happy Days	Shravanthi "Shravs"	Telugu	Winner, Filmfare Award for Best Supporting Actress – Telugu
2008	Vinayakudu	Kalpana	Telugu	
2010	Paiyaa	Priya	Tamil	
2010	Inidhu Inidhu	Shravanthi "Shravs"	Tamil	Remake of Happy Days
2010	Brahmalokam To Yamalokam Via Bhulokam	Shwetha	Telugu	
2011	Dookudu	Prashanthi's friend	Telugu	
2013	Mr. Manmadha	Sonia	Telugu	
2014	Ninnindale	Vicky's friend	Kannada	
2015	Mama Manchu Alludu Kanchu	Divya	Telugu	
2016	Chinni Chinni Asalu Naalo Regene	Nithya	Telugu	
2016	Maya Mall		Telugu	Guest appearance
2017	Puriyatha Puthir		Tamil	Cameo appearance
2023	Miss Shetty Mr Polishetty	Kavya	Telugu	

=== Other work ===
Year	Film	Notes
2015	Respect doesn't stop @ 9 - India's Daughter	English short film
2015	Seventh Heaven	English music Video
