= Drive (2025 film) =

2025 Indian Telugu film by Jenuse Mohamed

- Theatrical release poster
- Directed by: Jenuse Mohamed
- Written by: Jenuse Mohamed
- Produced by: V. Ananda Prasad
- Starring: Aadhi Pinisetty; Madonna Sebastian
- Cinematography: Abinandhan Ramanujam
- Edited by: Prawin Pudi
- Music by: Osho Venkat
- Production company: Bhavya Creations
- Release date: 12 December 2025
- Running time: 107 minutes
- Country: India
- Language: Telugu

Drive is a 2025 Indian Telugu-language drama thriller film written and directed by Jenuse Mohamed. The film was produced by Bhavya Creations and stars Aadhi Pinisetty, and Madonna Sebastian.

The film was released on 12 December 2025.

== Plot ==
The film follows Jayadev Reddy (played by Aadhi Pinisetty), a powerful media tycoon who is involved in a secret deal with a nationalist group and plans to move abroad with his family. His life takes a deadly turn when an anonymous, highly skilled hacker exposes his confidential dealings and begins targeting him. Suddenly, Jayadev finds himself thrust into a high-stakes digital game where the hacker forces him to follow dangerous orders. As the hacker continues to disrupt Jayadev's reputation, empire, and loved ones, he must stay on the run and unravel who is behind the attacks, why they are after him, and how to protect what matters most. The story combines suspense, revenge, and high-tension action as Jayadev fights to survive and outsmart his unseen adversary

== Cast ==
- Aadhi Pinisetty as Jaidev Reddy
  - Aakash Srinivas as Young Jaidev
- Madonna Sebastian as Shreya
- Kamal Kamaraju as Ishan
- Raja Chembolu as Ajay
- Anish Kuruvilla as Siddique
- Gururaj Manepalli as Rao
- Kotesh Manava as Prashanth Iyer
- Anuj Gurwara as Ashutosh Bose
- Satyadev as John/Hacker
- Kothala Bhanu Prakash as Young John

== Release and reception ==
Drive was released on 12 December 2025. It was later released on Amazon Prime Video on 2 January 2026. It was also released on Aha on 30 Jan

Sai Kiran of Vaartha gave a rating of 3 out of 5 and was critical towards writing.
