= Meenakshi (2005 film) =

- Directed by: T. Prabhakar
- Written by: T. Prabhakar
- Produced by: P. Vedavati; B. C. M. Reddy; M. V .R. Prasad Reddy (presents)
- Starring: Kamalini Mukherjee; Rajeev Kanakala; Amit Tiwari
- Cinematography: V. N. Suresh Kumar
- Edited by: Nagi Reddy
- Music by: Prabhu
- Production company: Eeswar Art Pictures
- Release date: 18 November 2005
- Country: India
- Language: Telugu

Meenakshi is a 2005 Indian Telugu-language romantic drama film written and directed by T. Prabhakar. The film stars Kamalini Mukherjee in the titular role alongside Rajeev Kanakala and Amit Tiwari in their lead debut. The film was released to negative reviews and was a box office failure.

== Cast ==
- Kamalini Mukherjee as Meenakshi
- Rajeev Kanakala as Nandu
- Amit Tiwari as Sanjay
- Sivakrishna
- Preeti Nigam
- Rambabu
- Ali
- Kavitha
- Draksharamam Sarojini

== Soundtrack ==
The music was composed by Prabhu with lyrics by Sri Harsha. The audio rights were purchased by Aditya Music.

Track listing
No.	Title	Singer(s)	Length
1.	"Chemma Chekka"	Srikanth, Nishma
2.	"Ninne Choosina"	Sandeep, Usha
3.	"Lalamma Lali"	Suresh
4.	"Anandam"	Venugopal
5.	"Siva Siva"	Mallikarjun
6.	"Meenakshi"	Vasanth, Surekha Murthy

== Reception ==
Jeevi of Idlebrain.com rated the film 1.5/5 and wrote, "Meenakshi disappoints a lot". A critic from Telugucinema.com wrote, "The director T Prabhakar has handled all the major departments including writing, music and direction but this jack-of-all-trades churns out ludicrous film".
