= Kuberaa =

2025 Indian film by Sekhar Kammula

- Theatrical release poster
- Directed by: Sekhar Kammula
- Written by: Sekhar Kammula; Chaithanya Pingali
- Produced by: Suniel Narang; Puskur Ram Mohan Rao; Ajay Kaikala
- Starring: Dhanush; Nagarjuna; Rashmika Mandanna; Jim Sarbh
- Cinematography: Niketh Bommi
- Edited by: Karthika Srinivas
- Music by: Devi Sri Prasad
- Production companies: Sree Venkateswara Cinemas LLP; Amigos Creations
- Release date: 20 June 2025
- Running time: 181 minutes (Telugu); 182 minutes (Tamil)
- Country: India
- Languages: Telugu; Tamil
- Budget: est. ₹120–150 crore (Note: Deccan Herald reported ₹120 crore. Cinema Express reported ₹150 crore.)
- Box office: est. ₹115–132 crore (Note: Kuberaa's reported worldwide grosses vary between ₹115 crore (Hindustan Times) – ₹132 crore (The Hans India; News18))

Kuberaa is a 2025 Indian action drama film directed by Sekhar Kammula, who co-wrote the screenplay with Chaithanya Pingali. Produced by Sree Venkateswara Cinemas LLP and Amigos Creations, the film was simultaneously shot in Telugu and Tamil. It stars Dhanush, Nagarjuna, Rashmika Mandanna and Jim Sarbh.

The film was announced in June 2021. Principal photography took place between February 2024 and April 2025. The film has music composed by Devi Sri Prasad, cinematography by Niketh Bommireddy, editing by Karthika Srinivas and production design by Thota Tharani.

Kuberaa was released worldwide on 20 June 2025 to highly positive reviews from critics, with praise for its concept and Dhanush's performance while criticisms were highlighted at its runtime and climax. The film was a box office success in Telugu but a box office failure in Tamil, grossing ₹115–132 crore.

== Plot ==
Neeraj Mitra, a Mumbai businessman, discovers an oil reserve hidden in the Bay of Bengal. Eager to turn it into a source of wealth, he plans a mission along with his business tycoon dad, with the backing of Minister Sidappa, and he sends a team to brutally kill the oil reserve workers and explode it. To make it work, he turns to Deepak Tej, an ex-C.B.I. officer now in prison for refusing to bow to corruption. Left with no choice, Deepak agrees to help. Though he does not share Neeraj's greed, his circumstances force him into the plan. Deepak gathers a group of beggars and makes them benamis, creating fake companies in their name and transferring funds between them. The beggars, Khelu, Dibya, Kushboo, and Deva Kallam, from across the country to carry out the job quietly in Mumbai. Deva, a kind-hearted, naive man from Tirupati, along with the other beggars have no idea what they have been dragged into. All four beggars are made to stay at a house with a cruel man named Robo, who takes advantage of the beggars and removes one of Khelu's teeth after he stole Kushboo's money. Deva gains blind trust for Deepak, who reminds him of his now-dead brother Obulesh. Eventually, Robo kills Khelu and Dibya after their financial transactions are complete.

Deva calls Deepak and tells him that Khelu is missing. Afterwards, Neeraj talks with Deepak and tells him that he plans to kill the beggars after they are done with them, which Deepak has second thoughts about. Robo takes advantage of pregnant Kushboo, but Deva defends her. Eventually, Deva completes an iris scan, and Robo takes him to a secluded spot to kill him but he escapes. This sparks a manhunt with Neeraj and Deepak racing to find him before the truth unravels, and they face the dire consequences of losing him. On the run, Deva meets Sameera, who has been stranded in Mumbai after her boyfriend jilted her. Deva almost dies after Robo catches him, but some dogs go after Robo and eat half of his arm. Deepak goes to Tirupati in search of him after being instructed to do so by Neeraj.

Deva frequents Sameera, who now stays in a women's hostel after her friend's father did not let her stay at their place. They live off of Kushboo's money, as she left a small box of money and told Deva that he should use it if anything happened to her. She helps Deva to meet Narayan Gaikwad, one of the people Deva had a transaction with, who was killed by Neeraj. Deva tells the sub-inspector Ashok about the transaction, but the lack of details meant that Deva was thrown in jail for a petty case. After recognising Neeraj's photo in a newspaper, Ashok agrees to let Deva help him in his investigation. Deva leads him to a room in a flat building, which Narayan frequents, and the two find suitcases of money and gold bars

Deepak hunts down the location of Deva and Ashok and Deepak subsequently kills Ashok. Deva sneaks up behind Deepak, who traced his location, and hits him on the head with a rock. Deepak, who reformed after seeing how inhumane Neeraj is, tells Deva and Sameera that he wants to help them after they keep him captive. Deva tells Deepak about how he wants all of the beggars in various cities to have necessities, and Deepak tells Deva that to expose Neeraj, they need evidence. Deepak reveals to them that Kushboo is still alive and well, and Deva demands that he meet Kushboo. Robo and his team track down their location and catch Kushboo, but Deva attacks him, and Kushboo goes into labour. Deepak protects them by killing Robo and his men, but Kushboo dies after giving birth to her son, and Deepak is shot in the process. Before dying, he asks Deva to think of him as Obulesh, Deva's brother, leaving Deva and Sameera devastated. As Deva and Sameera perform the last rites for Deepak and Kushboo, they discuss their plans, and Deva decides to protect Kushboo's son. Deva helps a lorry driver unload crores of money that was stored in a storage locker in front of Neeraj's house.

Neeraj asks Deva what his demands are, and Deva tells Neeraj that he should live as a beggar for one day. Despite living as a beggar for one day, Neeraj does not reform, as he does not take his job seriously and doesn't ask for alms, as he intends to find Deva. A fight in a garbage landfill leads Deva killing Neeraj. Sidappa strikes another deal for his oil rig while Deva brings Kushboo's son to Tirupati, where a beggar names him Kuberaa.

== Cast ==
- Dhanush as Deva Kalam
  - Sai Suresh as young Deva
- Nagarjuna as Deepak Tej/Obulesh
- Rashmika Mandanna as Sameera
- Jim Sarbh as Neeraj Mitra
- Hareesh Peradi as R. Siddappa, Minister of Petroleum and Natural Gas
- Sunaina as Shilpa / Deepa (Tamil version), Deepak's wife
- Saurav Khurana as Robo
- Colonel Ravikantha Sharma as Patil
- Shravani as Khushboo
- Ajithlal Sivalal as Khelu
  - Master Sumit as young Khelu
- Sathyam Gurung as Dibya
  - Ingnam Lingoo Subba as young Dibya
- Nassar as an orphanage caretaker
- Bagavathi Perumal as Master
- Jayaprakash as Narayan Gaikwad, Sub-registrar
- Sayaji Shinde as SI Ashok Godbole
- Dalip Tahil as Neeraj's father
- K. Bhagyaraj as Deva's mentor / sadhu (cameo appearance)

== Production ==
=== Development ===
In June 2021, ahead the release of his Jagame Thandhiram, Dhanush officially announced his upcoming film directed by Sekhar Kammula. It would be produced by Sree Venkateswara Cinemas, LLP and Amigos Creations. A muhurat puja was held on 28 November 2022 in Hyderabad. Nagarjuna and Rashmika Mandanna were announced as the other leading actors in August 2023. While the film was originally known under the working title D51, as it is Dhanush's 51st film as the leading actor, with the arrival of Nagarjuna, it was changed to DNS, the initialism referring to Dhanush, Nagarjuna and Sekhar. The official title, Kubera, was announced on 8 March 2024. Almost a year later, the spelling was amended to Kuberaa.

=== Filming ===
Principal photography began with the first schedule on 17 January 2024 in Hyderabad. In late January, production moved to a temple in Tirupati, Andhra Pradesh. However, the team were filming near the Ghat Roads by Alipiri, leading to vehicles moving towards the temple, being redirected by the police and the bouncers. The roadblocks and diversion led to commotion and traffic jams around the temple. The public went on to question the police to know how they permitted the team to shoot at that spot and filed a police complaint against the team. The second schedule commenced on 8 February in Goa. On 13 March, the production house posted behind-the-scene stills, while also announcing a new schedule in Bangkok. In late April, Mandanna posted on social media, "Andddddd it’s a wrap #Kubera". This led to assumptions that principal photography had wrapped. However, in early May, production moved to Mumbai. During this schedule, Dhanush shot a sequence for 12 hours beside a dump yard. Actual filming wrapped in April 2025.

=== Title dispute ===
In April 2024, film producer Karmikonda Narendra stated that he owned the rights of the title Kubera and had already completed shooting a film with the title. He filed a complaint, but was not responded to. Soon after, Narendra urged the Telangana Film Chamber to intervene and resolve the dispute. Kammula's film was subsequently renamed Kuberaa.

== Soundtrack ==
The soundtrack is composed by Devi Sri Prasad in his third collaboration with Dhanush and first with Sekhar Kammula. The audio rights were acquired by Aditya Music.

The first single, "Poyiraa Mama" was released on 2 March 2025. The second single, "Anaganaga Kadha" was released on 2 June 2025.

Telugu tracklisting
No.	Title	Lyrics	Singer(s)	Length
1.	"Poyiraa Mama"	Bhaskarabhatla	Dhanush	4:03
2.	"Trance of Kuberaa"	Nanda Kishore	Hema Chandra, Dhanush	2:08
3.	"Anaganaga Kadha"	Chandrabose	Hyde Karty, Kareemullah	3:00
4.	"Pippi Pippi Dum Dum Dum"	Chaitanya Pingali	Indravathi Chauhan	4:44
5.	"Naa Koduka"	Nanda Kishore	Sinduri Vishal	3:47
6.	"Aaye Aaye"	Nanda Kishore	Kareemullah	1:06
7.	"Haji Ali"	Kareemullah	Raqueeb Alam	1:49
8.	"Shankara"	Kalyan Chakravarthy	Devi Sri Prasad, chorus	1:34
9.	"Maadi Maadi"	Nanda Kishore	Dhanush	1:42
Total length:				20:43

Tamil tracklisting
No.	Title	Lyrics	Singer(s)	Length
1.	"Poyivaa Nanba"	Viveka	Dhanush	4:03
2.	"Trance of Kuberaa"	Viveka	Deepak Blue, Dhanush	2:08
3.	"Kadha Kadha Kadhai"	Viveka	Hyde Karty, Kareemullah	3:00
4.	"En Magane"	Viveka	Sinduri Vishal	4:45
5.	"Yamathu Yamathu"	Viveka	Dhanush	1:42
Total length:				15:38

== Release ==
=== Theatrical ===
Kuberaa was released worldwide on 20 June 2025 in theatres. The Tamil Nadu distribution rights were bought by Romeo Pictures.

=== Home media ===
The post-theatrical streaming rights were acquired by Amazon Prime Video, where it began streaming on 18 July 2025 in Tamil, Telugu, Hindi, Malayalam and Kannada.

== Reception ==
=== Critical response ===
Avad Mohammad of OTTPlay gave 4/5 stars and wrote "Kuberaa is one of the best Telugu films in recent times. With gripping thrills, heartfelt emotions, a compelling story, and a powerful message, the film delivers on every front." Paul Nicodemus of The Times of India gave 3.5/5 stars and wrote "Kuberaa is not your usual commercial potboiler—and that's precisely what makes it worth a watch. It's a brooding, introspective take on wealth and morality. It's not flawless, but it's a bold leap from a filmmaker unafraid to reinvent his canvas." Swaroop Kodur of The Indian Express gave 3.5/5 stars and wrote "Kuberaa wears its bleeding heart on its sleeve for the marginalised, and while several scenes are effective, a few others feel repetitive and yank the pacing.[...] If the bloated duration of the film could be overlooked, Kuberaa stands apart from all the cacophony around as a one-of-a-kind 'mass' experience." BH Harsh of Cinema Express gave 3.5/5 stars and wrote "Dhanush's performance, aided by Sekhar's direction, does wonders here. [...] Kuberaa is a bold stroke of filmmaking, staunch in its commentary and so affecting in its sentiment. A few quibbles can be ignored."

Janani K of India Today gave 3/5 stars and wrote "Kuberaa raises important questions about justice, money and power. But, it is not one without flaws. The pre-climax and climax feel a bit rushed and lack emotional connect. That said, Kuberaa presents a world that will keep you intrigued." Kirubhakar Purushothaman of News18 gave 3/5 stars and wrote "While Kuberaa carefully steers away from the generic nature of commercial entertainers, the end seems like an easy way out and undermines its desire to be unique." Sangeetha Devi Dundoo of The Hindu wrote "Kuberaa falls short of being a gamechanger. But it is a brave film from a director who has often stepped away from the norm, and raised pertinent questions. That is ample reason to cheer."

=== Box office ===
Kubera grossed ₹13 crore net on its opening day in India, with a worldwide gross of ₹26 crore, marking Dhanush's highest opening day collection. On its second day, the film earned an estimated ₹17 crore net in India, pushing the global gross past ₹50 crore. The third day saw collections of ₹18.5 crore net in India, resulting in a domestic weekend total of ₹48.5 crore and a global gross of approximately ₹79 crore. On the fourth day, earnings dropped to ₹7.25 crore net in India. By the end of its first week, the film had grossed an estimated ₹104 crore worldwide, with ₹78 crore from India and ₹26 crore from overseas markets. The Telugu version was commercially successful but the Tamil version significantly underperformed. The film grossed ₹115–132 crore worldwide in its theatrical run, finishing as a box office success despite the failure of the Tamil version.
