= Sekhar Kammula =

Indian film director, screenwriter and producer

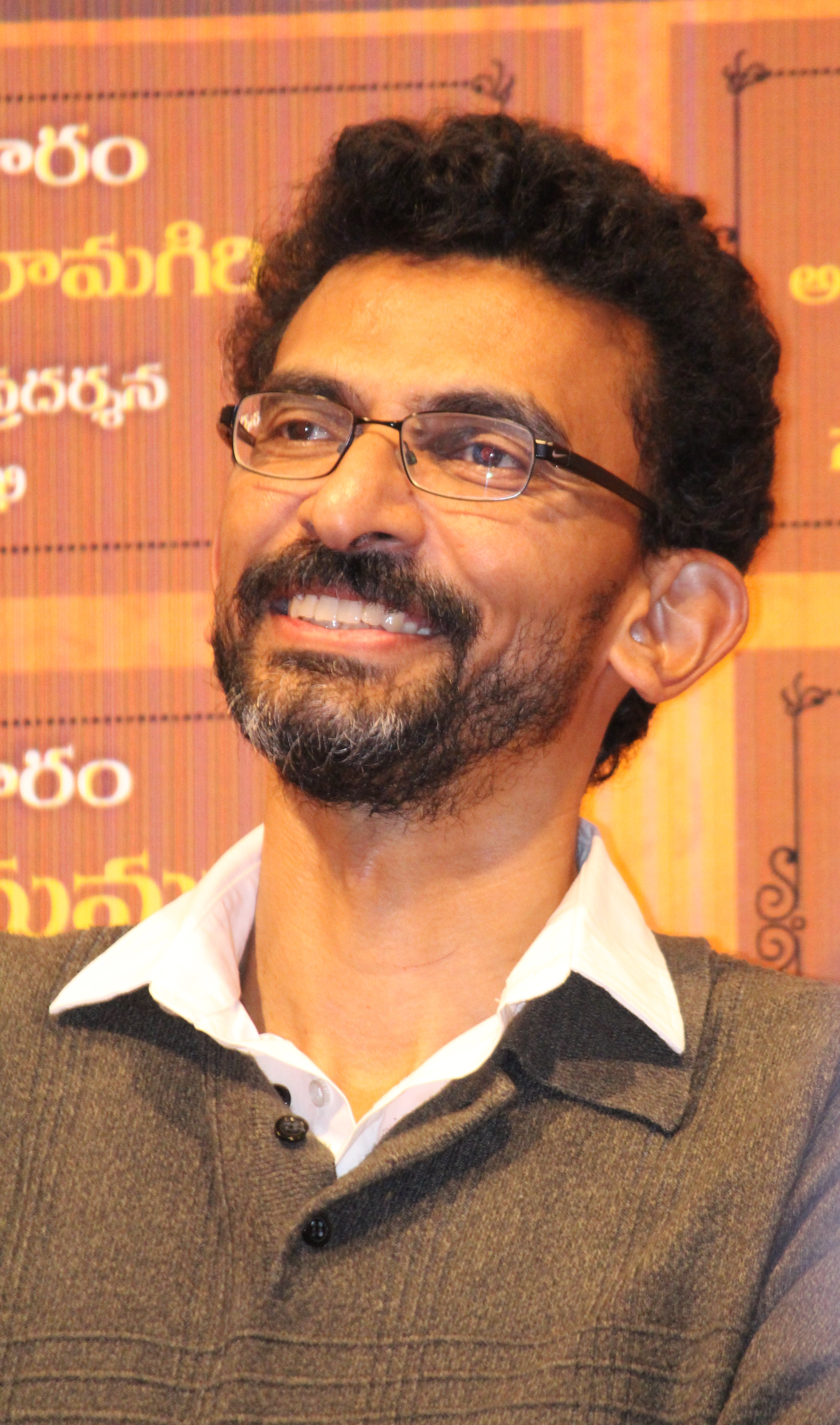
- Kammula in 2017
- Born: 4 February 1972 (age 54); Eluru, Andhra Pradesh, India
- Education: Chaitanya Bharathi Institute of Technology (B.Tech); Rutgers University (M.S); Howard University (M.F.A)
- Occupations: Film director; screenwriter; producer
- Years active: 1999–present
- Spouse: Sri Vidya
- Awards: National Film Award
- Website: www.sekharkammula.in

Sekhar Kammula (born 4 February 1972) is an Indian film director, screenwriter and producer who works in Telugu cinema. He has garnered two Filmfare Awards South, and six state Nandi Awards for his directional works. Sekhar Kammula was among the director's delegation to represent South Indian Cinema at the 2011 Cannes Film Festival.

A Master of Science and Master of Fine Arts holder from Rutgers University and Howard University respectively, Sekhar Kammula made his directorial debut with the independent film Dollar Dreams (2000), which won him the National Film Award for Best First film of a director. The film was also screened at the International Film Festival of India. Kammula went onto direct critically and commercially successful Telugu films Anand (2004), Godavari (2006), Happy Days (2007), Leader (2010), Fidaa (2017), Love Story (2021), and Kuberaa (2025).

== Early life and education ==
Sekhar Kammula was born in Eluru, Andhra Pradesh and brought up in Hyderabad, Telangana. He graduated in Mechanical Engineering from Chaitanya Bharathi Institute of Technology, and completed his Masters M.S from Rutgers University in Computer Science in the U.S. He worked in the IT industry for about 3 years and then joined a film school and got his M.F.A (Film) degree at Howard University, Washington D.C. During this time he worked on a number of films (short and feature length) in the U.S.

== Film career ==
Kammula made his film directorial debut with the independent film Dollar Dreams (2000), shot in both Telugu and English which was a critical success, and won him the National Film Award for Best First film of a director. The film was screened at the International Film Festival of India.

His second film, Anand (2004) was a commercial success and was among highest grossing Telugu films of that year. His next film, Godavari (2006), was highly praised by critics but barely managed to break even commercially. However, over the years, both Anand and Godavari have gained a huge cult following and are considered to be two of the greatest Telugu films ever made.

In 2007, his directed Happy Days which depicted the regular college life of engineering students. The film was very successful, especially among the urban youth of then Andhra Pradesh. The film was later remade in Tamil and Kannada languages.

He then directed the political drama Leader, which released in 2010 to positive reviews. However, like Godavari, it too barely managed to break-even. Rediff.com noted that "If anything, the film is a wish-list of what one would like to see in the arena of politics, which Sekhar should be lauded for even trying." Many considered it to be way ahead of its time at release, but the film has managed to acquire a huge cult following and stay relevant during political elections, especially in Andhra Pradesh and Telangana.

In 2012, Kammula written, produced and directed Life Is Beautiful, his first production venture. The film had a positive reception from critics and audience. Firstpost called the film a revamped version of Happy Days (2007) and noted similarities between the characters written by Kammula in both the films. Later in 2014, he directed Anaamika, the Telugu remake of the 2012 Hindi cult blockbuster, Kahaani, in which Nayantara portrayed the original character of Vidya Balan. It opened to mixed reviews and was considered to be inferior to the original, eventually failing commercially.

In 2017, his romantic comedy film Fidaa, starring Varun Tej and Sai Pallavi, opened to highly positive reviews and grossed over ₹90 crore worldwide at the box office. Many considered it to be a return-in-form film for him. In 2021, Kammula's Telugu film, Love Story, starring Naga Chaitanya and Sai Pallavi was released to mixed reviews and ended up becoming an above-average grosser at the box-office.

In 2025, his social thriller Kuberaa, featuring Tamil star Dhanush, Nagarjuna, and Rashmika Mandanna in the primary roles, opened to highly positive reviews and became the highest-grossing film of his career.

== Film directorial style ==
Sekhar Kammula’s films often focus on the relationship between men and women in their routine life circumstances filled with both happiness and hardships. Sankeertana Varma of Film Companion calls film portrayal of his female characters as somewhat "special." She writes that they aren't particular "strong women" but they are real. Varma adds that though his female characters display their egos and throw tantrums, they are unbreakable and refuse to fit in the typical societal norms expected from a normal woman. Kammula himself has also stated that he likes to keep his characters grounded, including the men in his films, and not commercialize them for improving the commercial prospect of his films.

== Filmography ==
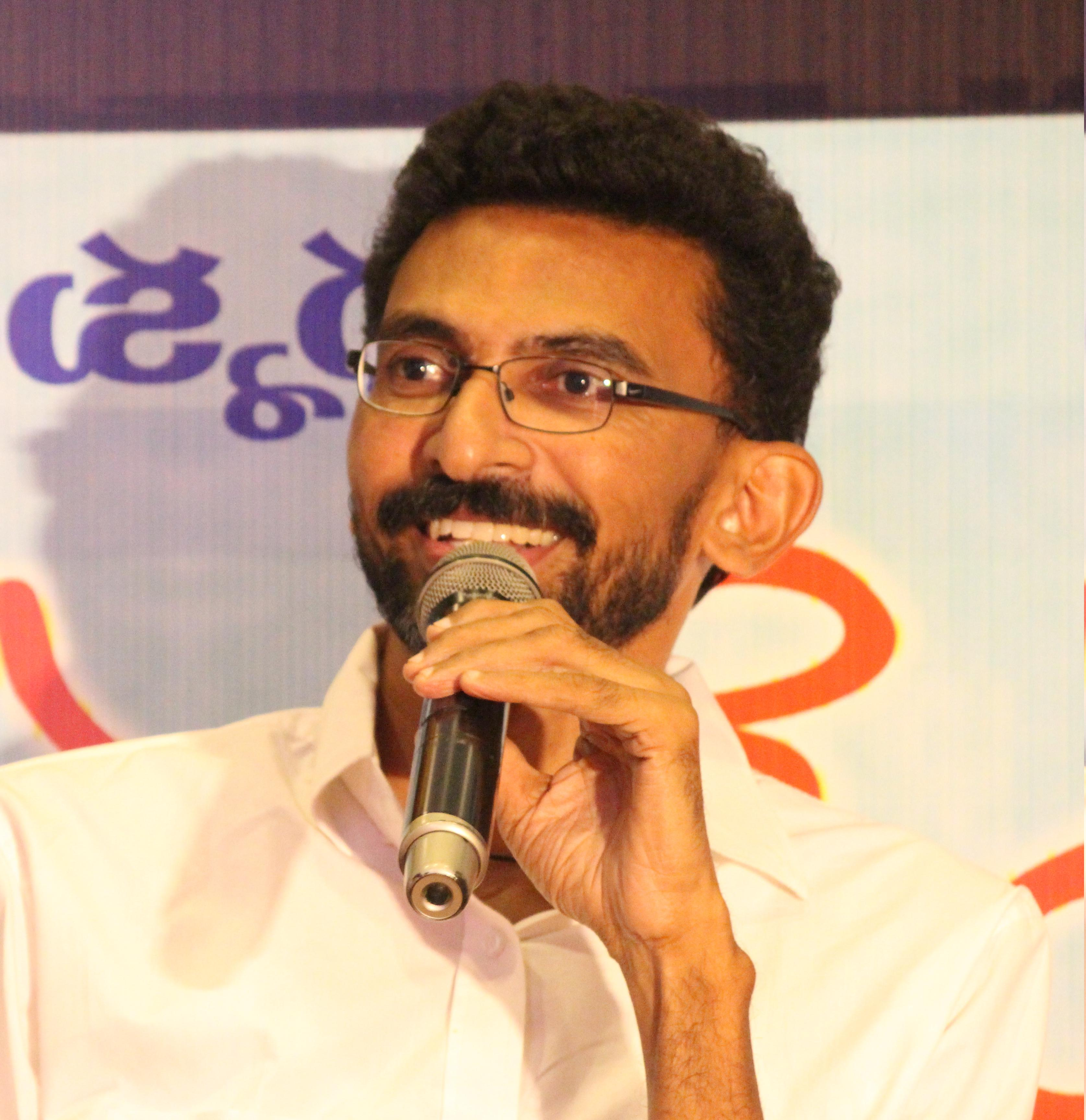
Kammula at Cinivaram, Ravindra Bharathi in 2017

Year	Film	Language	Credited as			Notes
Year	Film	Language	Director	Writer	Producer	Notes
2000	Dollar Dreams	Telugu; English	Yes	Yes	Yes	Directorial debut, Bilingual film
2004	Anand	Telugu	Yes	Yes	Yes	Also choreographer
2006	Godavari	Telugu	Yes	Yes	No	
2007	Happy Days	Telugu	Yes	Yes	Yes	Also choreographer
2008	Avakai Biryani	Telugu	No	No	Yes	
2010	Leader	Telugu	Yes	Yes	No	
2012	Life Is Beautiful	Telugu	Yes	Yes	Yes	
2014	Anaamika	Telugu; Tamil	Yes	Screenplay	No	Released in Tamil as Nee Enge En Anbe, Bilingual film
2017	Fidaa	Telugu	Yes	Yes	No	
2021	Love Story	Telugu	Yes	Yes	No	
2025	Kuberaa	Telugu; Tamil	Yes	Yes	No	Bilingual film; co-written with Chaithanya Pingali

Cameo appearances

Year	Title	Role	Notes
2000	Dollar Dreams	Sekhar	
2004	Anand	Auto driver	
2006	Godavari	Kotigadu (voice)	
2008	Avakai Biryani	Hotel customer	
2014	Mukunda	Bus traveller	

=== Recurring collaborations ===
This list only concerns Sekhar Kammula's directorial films.

List of Sekhar Kammula recurring collaborations
Film	Vijay C. Kumar	Marthand K. Venkatesh	Anish Kuruvilla	Satya Krishnan	K. M. Radha Krishnan	Kamalinee Mukherjee	Mickey J. Meyer	C. V. L. Narasimha Rao	Tanikella Bharani	Harshvardhan Rane
Dollar Dreams (2000)	Yes	Yes	Yes	Yes						
Anand (2004)	Yes	Yes	Yes	Yes	Yes	Yes				
Godavari (2006)	Yes	Yes	Executive producer		Yes	Yes		Yes	Yes	
Happy Days (2007)	Yes	Yes				Cameo	Yes			
Leader (2010)	Yes	Yes					Yes		Yes	
Life Is Beautiful (2012)	Yes	Yes					Yes	Yes		
Anaamika / Nee Enge En Anbe (2014)	Yes	Yes						Yes		Yes
Fidaa (2017)	Yes	Yes								Cameo
Love Story (2021)	Yes	Yes								
Kuberaa (2025)										

== Awards and nominations ==
Year	Awards	Category	Film	Result
1999	National Film Awards	Best Debut Film of a Director	Dollar Dreams	Won
2004	Nandi Awards	Best Director	Anand	Won
2004	Nandi Awards	Second Best Film	Anand	Won
2005	Filmfare Awards South	Best Film	Anand	Nominated
2005	Filmfare Awards South	Best Director	Anand	Nominated
2006	Nandi Awards	Best Director	Godavari	Won
2006	Nandi Awards	Second Best Film	Godavari	Won
2006	Filmfare Awards South	Best Director	Godavari	Nominated
2007	Nandi Awards	Best Film - Silver	Happy Days	Won
2008	Filmfare Awards South	Best Film	Happy Days	Won
2008	Filmfare Awards South	Best Director	Happy Days	Won
2008	CineMAA Awards	Best Film	Happy Days	Won
2008	CineMAA Awards	Best Director	Happy Days	Won
2008	CineMAA Awards	Best Story	Happy Days	Won
2008	CineMAA Awards	Best Screenplay	Happy Days	Won
2009	Nandi Awards	Best Story Writer	Leader	Won
2010	Filmfare Awards South	Best Film	Leader	Nominated
2010	Filmfare Awards South	Best Director	Leader	Nominated
2018	Filmfare Awards South	Best Film	Fidaa	Nominated
2018	Filmfare Awards South	Best Director	Fidaa	Nominated
2018	Zee Cine Awards Telugu	Best Director	Fidaa	Won
