= Satya Krishnan =

Indian actress

- Born: Satya; 11 May 1982 (age 44); Hyderabad, Andhra Pradesh, India (now in Telangana, India)
- Occupation: Actress
- Years active: 2000; 2004–present
- Spouse: Krishnan

Satya Krishnan is an Indian actress who works in Telugu films. She made her screen debut with Dollar Dreams (2000) and her best known performance was in the drama film Anand (2004) as Anitha.

She has since appeared in supporting roles in notable films like Bommarillu (2006), Vinayakudu (2008), Dookudu (2011), Lovely (2012), Bhale Bhale Magadivoy (2015) and Little Hearts (2025). She has also played the lead role in Posani Krishna Murali-directorial Mental Krishna (2009).

== Early life ==
Satya was born in Hyderabad, India in a Telugu family. Both her parents have migrated from Andhra Pradesh to Hyderabad. Her father is a native of Guntur, while her mother is a native of Rajahmundry. She completed her studies is and did a course in Hotel Management and worked at Taj Hotel in Hyderabad. She wanted to be an air hostess.

== Career ==
Satya entered the film industry in 2000 with the film Dollar Dreams directed by Sekhar Kammula. Later she got married and took up a job at BNP Paribas Bank in Punjagutta. After four years, Sekhar Kammula again approached her with a role in his film Anand (2004). She quit her job and began working full-time as an actress. She said that her character in Anand is very close to her real life character. She won a Nandi Award for her role in the film.

She has also been seen in other films including Bommarillu, Premante Inte, Venkat Kuchipudi's Modati Cinema, Ullasamga Utsahamga and Vinayakudu. She played a lead role for the first time in her career in Mental Krishna but the film was not well received. In its review for the film Lovely (2012), The Hindu wrote: "Satya Krishna ... gets some of the best lines in the film and we wish her role was better etched out. She runs the risk of being typecast in firebrand kind of roles though".

In 2020, she appeared in the sitcom web series Amrutham Dhvitheeyam, which is the third installment in the Amrutham franchise.

== Filmography ==
=== Telugu films ===
Year	Title	Role	Notes
2000	Dollar Dreams	Archana	
2004	Anand	Anita	Nandi Award for Best Supporting Actress; Nominated–Filmfare Award for Best Supporting Actress – Telugu
2005	Modati Cinema	Sathya	
2006	Premanthe Inthe		
2006	Bommarillu	Siddhu's sister-in-law	
2006	Samanyudu	Vidya	
2006	Nuvve		
2007	Athili Sattibabu LKG		
2007	Bahumati		
2007	Viyyalavari Kayyalu		
2008	Ready	Raja Ram's wife	
2008	Ullasamga Utsahamga	Aravind's sister-in-law	
2008	Raksha	Madhu Venu	
2008	Vinayakudu	Aparna	partially reshot in Tamil as Vinayaga
2009	Mental Krishna	Satya Muddukrishna	Lead role
2010	Kalyanram Kathi	Ramakrishna's sister-in-law	
2011	Vastadu Naa Raju		
2011	Vykuntapali	Tanmayi	
2011	Babloo		
2011	Mayagadu	Spandana	
2011	Dhada	Rhea's mom	
2011	Dookudu	Ajay's cousin	
2012	Okkadine		
2012	Lovely	Satya	
2012	Ishq	Geetha	
2012	Endukante Premanta	Doctor	
2012	Rachcha		
2012	Srimannarayana		
2012	Yamudiki Mogudu	Naresh's sister-in-law	
2012	Dhamarukam		
2013	Baadshah	Supriya Simha	
2013	Aha Naa Premanta	Satya	
2013	Doosukeltha		
2013	Prema Geema Jantha Nai		
2013	Band Baaja		
2013	Gali Seenu		
2014	Manam	Lecturer	
2014	Oohalu Gusagusalade	Prabha's sister-in-law	
2014	Govindudu Andarivadele	Abhiram's aunt	
2014	Pilla Nuvvu Leni Jeevitham	Satya	
2015	Ori Devudoy	Saraswati	
2015	James Bond		
2015	Bhale Bhale Magadivoy	Nandana's relative	
2015	Thanu Nenu		
2015	365 Days		
2015	Soukhyam	Deva's wife	
2015	Tharuvatha Katha		
2016	Oopiri	Physiotherapist	
2016	Eedo Rakam Aado Rakam	Satya	
2017	London Babulu	Kutumba's assistant	
2017	Rarandoi Veduka Chudham		
2017	Raju Gari Gadhi 2	Lecturer	
2017	Hello	Priya's mother	
2018	Achari America Yatra	Devasena	
2018	Nela Ticket	Old man's daughter-in-law	
2018	Naa Peru Surya	Mustafa's wife	
2018	Pantham	House Owner's wife	
2018	Neevevaro	Anu's mother	
2018	Devadas	Das's sister-in-law	
2018	Taxiwaala	Doctor	
2019	Tenali Ramakrishna BA. BL	Fake Witness	
2019	Pichhodu	Rishi's mother	
2019	Mr. Majnu	Nikki's Sister-In-Law	
2020	HIT: The First Case	Priya	
2021	Alludu Adhurs	Pandu's sister	
2021	Most Eligible Bachelor	Harsha's sister	
2022	Aadavallu Meeku Johaarlu	Chiru's aunt	
2022	Gangster Gangaraju	Satya	
2022	10th Class Diaries	Gourav's wife	
2022	Bujji Ila Raa	School Headmistress	
2022	Ammu	Police Constable	
2023	Asalu		
2023	Samajavaragamana	Sarayu's aunt	
2023	Extra Ordinary Man	Likitha's aunt	
2024	Inti No. 13		
2024	Mathu Vadalara 2	Damini	
2024	Dhoom Dhaam	Sruthi’s mother	
2024	Fear		
2025	Little Hearts	Kathyayini's mother	
2025	Mithra Mandali	Abhi’s mother	
2025	Santhana Prapthirasthu	Dr. Padmavathi	
2026	M4M: Motive for Murder		
2026	Mr. Work from Home	Shyamala	
2026	Oka Court Case		

=== Other language films ===
Year	Title	Role	Language
2007	FM Fun Aur Masti	David's wife	Dakhini
2008	Santosh Subramaniam	Sanjay's wife	Tamil
2016	Thozha	Physiotherapist	Tamil
2016	Tamilselvanum Thaniyar Anjalum	Shakthivel's wife	Tamil
2025	Madha Gaja Raja	Ramesh's wife	Tamil

=== Television ===
Year	Title	Role	Network	Ref.
2020	Amrutham Dhvitheeyam	Sanjeevani (Sanju)	ZEE5	
2020	Loser	Ruksana	ZEE5	
2023	Save the Tigers	Spandana	Disney+ Hotstar	
2023	Dhootha	Konidela Lakshmi	Amazon Prime Video	
