= Kamalinee Mukherjee =

Indian actress

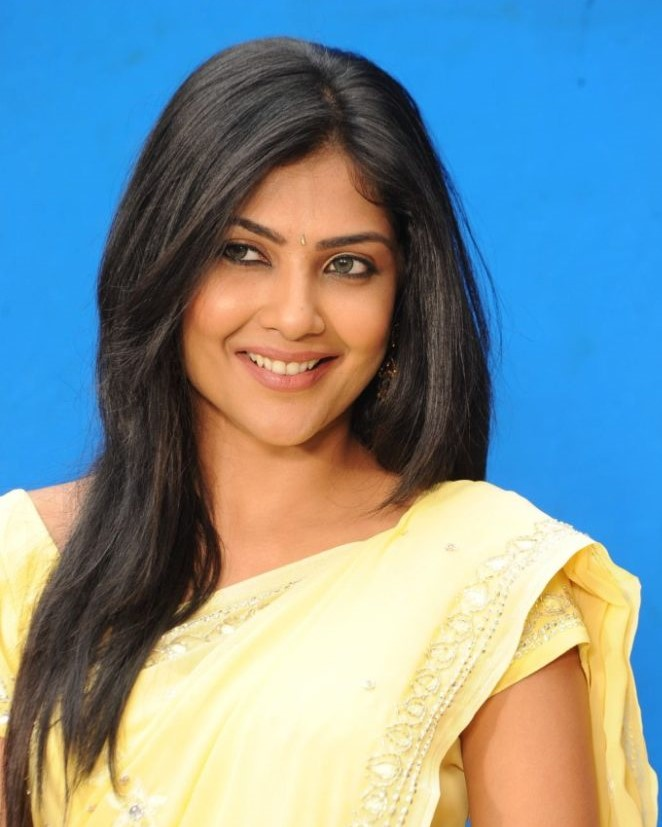
- Born: 4 March 1984 (age 42); Kolkata, West Bengal, India
- Occupation: Actress
- Years active: 2004–2016

Kamalinee Mukherjee is an Indian actress. She has predominantly appeared in Telugu films as well as a few Malayalam and Tamil films.

After graduating with a degree in English literature, she completed a workshop on theatre in Mumbai. She made her acting debut in Phir Milenge (2004), a film that was based on the subject of AIDS. She then appeared in the Telugu film Anand also in 2004.

== Early life ==
Kamalinee was born 4 March 1984 and brought up in Kolkata, India. Her father is a marine engineer and her mother is a jewellery designer. She is the eldest of the three siblings in the family. Owing to her "love for being on the stage" since childhood, she acted in all sorts of amateur and professional stageplays while in school and college. Incidentally, she always portrayed masculine characters in these plays. Besides theatre, she developed a love for reading, painting and writing. She also underwent several years of training in Bharatanatyam.

After graduating with a degree in English literature from Loreto College in Kolkata, she began a hotel management course in New Delhi but left it to pursue a course in theatre in Mumbai.

== Acting career ==
=== Breakthrough ===
After a chance meeting, actor-director Revathi offered her a role in her second directorial venture, Phir Milenge, a film about AIDS. Though initially apprehensive about her entering into the acting profession, her parents were very supportive. In the film, she plays a radio jockey, and the younger sibling to Shilpa Shetty's character.

Around the same time, Sekhar Kammula, a national award-winning director from the Telugu film industry, was in the process of casting for his next Telugu film, Anand. After noticing her in an advertisement, Kammula selected her for the role. Mukherjee said that the role of an independent and modern woman, which was just like her own personality, appealed to her. The film won six prestigious 2004 Nandi Awards bestowed by the Government of Andhra Pradesh. Among these, Mukherjee won the Nandi Award for the Best Leading Actress. She also won two awards for being the best debutante actress of the year.

=== 2005–present ===
After receiving appreciation for her portrayal of a strong-willed, independent and modern woman in Anand, her next film was Meenakshi in 2005. Despite the film not finding much commercial success, Mukherjee said that she did not regret doing the film and that it was a big learning curve. Film reviewers praised Mukherjee for her acting skills. In 2006, she appeared in two Telugu language films (Style and Godavari) and one Tamil language film (Vettaiyaadu Vilaiyaadu). Style is a dance-based film with actor-choreographers Prabhu Deva, Raghava Lawrence, Charmee Kaur and Raja.

Godavari, which was Sekhar Kammula's next film, starred Sumanth and Mukherjee in the lead roles. This drama film, which had the Godavari River in the backdrop, dealt with a romantic love story between the lead characters. Mukherjee portrayed the role of a woman with independent thinking and tremendous inner strength, under the "backdrop of middle/upper middle class sensibilities, new aspirations, identity crisis, independence, yearnings and moreover, parental concerns". The film received predominantly positive reviews, and Kamalinee's role was particularly praised. While one reviewer said that she was "beautiful ... both in looks and in her measured acting style," another reviewer praised her for the "intense yet cool portrayal".

She made her Tamil debut in 2006 in Gautham Vasudev Menon's Vettiyadu Velliyadu starring Tamil superstar Kamal Haasan. Following this, came Gamyam by Krish, a film widely praised by critics and audiences alike and subsequently remade in Tamil and Kannada, both of which featured Kamalinee in the lead role. Gamyam was the only regional film from the south to be in the running for India's entry to the Academy Awards apart from sweeping both the Nandi and Filmfare Awards.

In 2009, she played the role of Latin Christian woman, Pemenna, in Kutty Srank, directed by Cannes award-winning director, Shaji N. Karun, and starring Malayalam matinee idol, Mammooty. The film swept the National Awards, winning in six categories including Best Film. In the same year, she worked in veteran director Vamsi's musical Gopi Gopika Godavari,.

In 2012, Kamalinee debuted in her native language, Bengali in National Award-winning director, Aniruddha Roy Chowdhury's Aparajita Tumi, starring Bengali superstar Prosenjit Chatterjee. The film met with critical and commercial success. Following Aparajita Tumi, Kamalinee also appeared in K Raghavendra Rao's devotional film, Shirdi Sai with Nagarjuna. Her next project was new-age Malayalam director, V. K. Prakash's Natholi Oru Cheriya Meenalla, where she played a quirky character opposite Fahadh Faasil.

In 2016, Kamalinee worked with award-winning director Karthik Subbaraj in his second directorial venture, a woman-oriented film, Iraivi. After her special-appearance song in Malayalam director Vysakh's 2014 film Cousins, she was cast opposite Mohanlal in the box office record-breaking Pulimurugan. Pulimurugan was the second highest-grossing Malayalam film.

=== Other activities ===
Kamalinee is a supporter of the non-profit organizations CHORD India and World Vision, which are both involved in rehabilitation, welfare and the education of children. She produces beauty tutorial videos along with her two younger sisters, Mrinalinee and Shohinee, for Mrinalinee's YouTube channel Mirror Mirror. In 2014, she launched Chinese-American poet Wand Ping's anthology Ten Thousand Waves in Hyderabad, India at a poetry reading event. Kamalinee was also part of the poets panel at the Bengaluru Poetry Festival in August 2016 where she read a selection of her poems alongside award-winning poet Dr. Neal Hall. She is an avid baker and cook and enjoys experimenting with cuisines from around the world.

== Filmography ==
Year	Film	Role	Language	Notes
2004	Phir Milenge	Tanya Sahni	Hindi	Debut film
2004	Anand	Rupa	Telugu	Telugu Debut as lead actress; Nandi Award for Best Actress; Nominated: Filmfare Award for Best Actress – Telugu
2005	Meenakshi	Meenakshi	Telugu	
2006	Style	Priya	Telugu	
2006	Vettaiyaadu Vilaiyaadu	Kayalvizhi Raghavan	Tamil	Tamil debut; cameo appearance
2006	Godavari	Seetha Mahalakshmi	Telugu	Nominated: Filmfare Award for Best Actress – Telugu
2007	Classmates	Razia	Telugu	
2007	Pellaindi Kaani	Gayatri	Telugu	
2007	Happy Days	Shreya Madam	Telugu	Cameo appearance
2008	Gamyam	Janaki	Telugu	Nominated: Filmfare Award for Best Actress – Telugu
2008	Jalsa	Indu	Telugu	Cameo appearance
2008	Brahmanandam Drama Company	Arpitha	Telugu	
2009	Kadhalna Summa Illai	Janaki	Tamil	partially reshot version of Gamyam
2009	Gopi Gopika Godavari	Gopika	Telugu	Nominated: Filmfare Award for Best Actress – Telugu
2010	Savari	Janaki	Kannada	Kannada Debut
2010	Police Police	Harika	Telugu	
2010	Kutty Shranku	Pemmena	Malayalam	Malayalam debut
2010	Maa Annayya Bangaram	Manjula	Telugu	
2010	Nagavalli	Gayathri	Telugu	
2011	Virodhi	Sunitha	Telugu	
2012	Aparajita Tumi	Ushoshi	Bengali	Bengali Debut
2012	Shirdi Sai	Radhakrishna Bai	Telugu	
2013	Natholi Oru Cheriya Meenalla	Prabha Thomas	Malayalam	
2013	Ramachari	Geetha	Telugu	
2013	Jagadguru Adi Shankara	Ubhaya Bharathi	Telugu	Cameo appearance
2014	Govindudu Andarivadele	Chitra	Telugu	
2014	Cousins	Herself	Malayalam	Cameo appearance - Song
2016	Iraivi	Yazhini	Tamil	
2016	Pulimurugan	Myna	Malayalam	
