= Leader (2010 film) =

- Theatrical release poster
- Directed by: Sekhar Kammula
- Written by: Sekhar Kammula
- Produced by: M. Saravanan; M. S. Guhan; Aruna Guhan; Aparna Guhan
- Starring: Rana Daggubati; Richa Gangopadhyay; Priya Anand
- Cinematography: Vijay C. Kumar
- Edited by: Marthand K Venkatesh
- Music by: Mickey J. Meyer
- Production company: AVM Productions
- Distributed by: Geetha Arts
- Release date: 19 February 2010
- Running time: 171 minutes
- Country: India
- Language: Telugu
- Box office: ₹10 crore distributors' share

Leader is a 2010 Indian Telugu-language political drama film written and directed by Sekhar Kammula, and produced by AVM Productions. It stars Rana Daggubati alongside Richa Gangopadhyay, Priya Anand, Suhasini Maniratnam, Suman, and Subbaraju. It marks Daggubati's acting debut as well as the Telugu film debuts of Gangopadhyay and Anand. The plot follows Arjun Prasad (Daggubati) who becomes the chief minister of Andhra Pradesh succeeding his deceased father and his struggle to fight the corruption plaguing the political system.

The film features music by Mickey J. Meyer with cinematography by Vijay C. Kumar and editing by Marthand K. Venkatesh. Leader was released on 19 February 2010 to rave reviews and was a commercial success. Over the years, it gained a cult following and was later remade in Hindi in 2014 as Youngistaan. Leader was listed among the "25 Greatest Telugu Films Of The Decade" by Film Companion.

== Plot ==
The fictional Andhra Pradesh Chief Minister Sanjeevayya is mortally wounded in a bomb attack, and in his last moments expresses the wish for his son Arjun to succeed him as the next CM. As Arjun contemplates his next steps, he learns from Sanjeevayya's diary that his People's Party is plagued with corrupt politicians supported by the elitist party president Mahadevayya, Sanjeevayya's brother. When he realizes his father initially sought reform but inevitably succumbed to corruption himself, Arjun decides to fulfill his father's dream and pursue the People's Party's nomination.

Arjun recruits political insider Ali and journalist Ratna Prabha to collect information about the People's Party and Dhanunjay, Arjun's criminal cousin and another contender. He takes advantage of the existing discontent towards Dhanunjay to covertly ally with his opponents, and wins the party nomination with Mahadevayya's blessing. Although Mahadevayya convinces Arjun to make Dhanunjay the Home Minister as pacification, a jealous and furious Dhanunjay orchestrates an assassination attempt on Arjun and is forced to resign when it fails.

Upon swearing in, Arjun immediately sets forth his anti-corruption agenda but faces resistance when his own party's MLAs are impacted by his policies. Dhanunjay seizes the opportunity and conspires with the resentful politicians to plan a coup. Anticipating the mutiny, Arjun schemes to ally with the opposing Alliance Party and woos Archana, the daughter of the party's leader Munuswami. While his plan works, Munuswami offers his support on condition that Arjun saves an influential Alliance Party MLA's son accused of raping and murdering a tribal girl. When a terrorist attack spreads a wave of criticism, Arjun relents to Munuswami and saves his government.

Following his decision, however, Arjun's mother Rajeswari criticizes him for betraying justice and passes away in her sleep. When Archana also leaves him after Dhanunjay informs her of his ploy, Arjun realizes he has compromised his values to protect his position, and he can never serve honorably while obligated to corrupt politicians. He unofficially orders his security chief to kill the MLA's son and his anti-corruption officers to raid and expose every corrupt elite, including Mahadevayya, Dhanunjay, and Munuswami. Arjun then resigns as CM to seek reelection as an independent. With Ali, Ratna Prabha, and Archana's support, Arjun wins the bye-election after a vigorous campaign and resolves to bring change.

== Cast ==
- Rana Daggubati as CM Dr. Arjun Prasad
- Richa Gangopadhyay as Archana, news reporter
- Priya Anand as Ratna Prabha, news reporter and Arjun's personal secretary
- Harsha Vardhan as Ali, political insider and Arjun's personal secretary
- Tanikella Bharani as Chief Secretary Sharma
- Suman as CM Sanjeevayya, Arjun's late father
- Suhasini Maniratnam as Rajeswari Devi, Arjun's mother
- Subbaraju as Dhanunjay, Arjun's cousin
- Kota Srinivasa Rao as Mahadevayya, Sanjeevayya's elder brother and People's Party president
- Rao Ramesh as Arjun's uncle and Dhanunjay's aid
- Ahuti Prasad as MLA Munuswami, Archana's father and Alliance Party leader
- Gollapudi Maruti Rao as a senior MLA
- Shatru as Archana's assistant
- Bhel Prasad Rao as Deputy CM
- Narsing Yadav
- Udaya Bhanu as item number in the song "Rajashekara"
- Kedar Shankar

== Soundtrack ==
The soundtrack has music composed by Mickey J. Meyer. The music was released on 22 November 2009.

Leader

Soundtrack album by Mickey J. Meyer
- Released: 22 November 2009
- Recorded: 2009
- Genre: Feature film soundtrack
- Length: 31:26
- Label: Aditya Music
- Producer: Mickey J. Meyer

Mickey J. Meyer chronology
Ganesh (2009)	Leader (2009)	Maro Charitra (2010)

Track list
No.	Title	Lyrics	Singer(s)	Length
1.	"Maa Telugu Thalliki"	Sankarambadi Sundarachari	Tanguturi Suryakumari	4:56
2.	"Aunana Kaadana"	Veturi	Naresh Iyer, Shweta Pandit	5:13
3.	"Vandemataram"	Veturi	Nakash Aziz	3:50
4.	"Rajasekhara"	Veturi	Shweta Pandit	5:29
5.	"Hey CM"	Veturi	Sunitha Sarathy	5:16
6.	"Sreelu Pongina"	Rayaprolu Subba Rao	Krishna Chaithanya, Siddharth, Kranthi, Sashi Kiran & Aditya	3:18
7.	"Leader Theme" (Instrumental)			3:24
Total length:				31:26

== Critical reception ==
Leader opened to rave reviews from critics. A The Times of India critic gave three stars of five, noting "Another lineage star Rana Daggubati takes his first bow at the Box Office with an inspiring political saga, he puts in a surprisingly mature performance (for a debutant) and shines in his role of a savvy young CEO of a US-based company who turns a conniving politician with effortless ease."

Radhika Rajamani from Rediff.com also gave a three star rating and said "The film is a relevant take on contemporary politics in the state of Andhra Pradesh. Performance-wise, Sekhar scores. His choice Suhasini as Arjun's mother is good. She brings grace and dignity to her role. An impressive debut, indeed. Richa Gangopadhyay looks pretty and charming. Harsha Vardhan (who plays Ali) and Priya Anand (Ratna Prabha) are competent in their roles. Mickey J. Meyer's music is good too."

A reviewer from Sify explains "The technical aspects of the film are highly impressive with superb cinematography, excellent music and terrific background score. The first half is gripping, giving some promising moments to the audience. But, the second half slips into monotony thanks to the slipshod treatment to the political subject." However it praised the lead performances, saying "Rana has certainly lived up to the expectations of the audiences with his looks and thoroughly trained histrionics."
