= Anand (2004 film) =

2004 Telugu film

- Poster
- Directed by: Sekhar Kammula
- Written by: Sekhar Kammula
- Produced by: Sekhar Kammula
- Starring: Raja; Kamalinee Mukherjee; Satya Krishnan; Anish Kuruvilla
- Cinematography: Vijay C Kumar
- Edited by: Marthand K. Venkatesh
- Music by: K. M. Radha Krishnan
- Production companies: Amigos Creations; NFDC
- Distributed by: Amigos Creations
- Release date: 15 October 2004
- Running time: 180 minutes
- Country: India
- Language: Telugu
- Budget: ₹30 Lakhs
- Box office: ₹8-10 crore distributors' share

Anand (Note: Taglined Manchi Coffee Lanti Cinema (transl. A movie like a good coffee)) is a 2004 Indian Telugu-language drama film written and directed by Sekhar Kammula. Produced jointly by Amigos Creations and National Film Development Corporation of India, the film stars Raja and Kamalinee Mukherjee. The film's basic story was also chosen as the subject for Sekhar Kammula's thesis screenplay, which was a requirement for his Master of Fine Arts at Howard University.

The film was screened at the International Film Festival of India in the mainstream section.

The film was well received by critics and became a major success at the box office. It was remade in Tamil as Ninaithaley. The film went on to win the Nandi Awards among several other prominent awards. The film's soundtrack was well appreciated for its soft melodies.

== Plot ==
Roopa, an independent, self-reliant woman working at an advertising agency, loses her parents and brother in a car accident at a young age. On her wedding day to Rahul, a wealthy Marwari man, his mother demands that Roopa wear a North Indian outfit instead of her late mother's saree. When Rahul remains silent and fails to support her, Roopa realises that her choice is not respected and calls off the wedding to preserve her individuality.

Unbeknownst to Roopa, the car accident that killed Roopa's family was caused by a wealthy industrialist. Distraught and guilt-ridden, the latter lost his mental stability after the incident. His son, Anand, brings him to Roopa's wedding hoping her happiness will bring peace to his father, but witnesses the wedding cancellation instead. Drawn to Roopa's strength, Anand abandons his higher studies in the United States. He moves into a house adjacent to hers in Hyderabad, and attempts to win her affection while keeping his identity and connection to her past a secret. With subtle guidance from Roopa's friend Anita, Anand continually interacts with Roopa, leading to frequent arguments and budding affection.

When Rahul's mother passes away months later, Rahul seeks comfort from Roopa, who offers him friendly support. When an intoxicated Rahul arrives at Roopa's home to force a reconciliation, an enraged Anand ejects him and confronts Roopa for entertaining Rahul's advances. Realising her true feelings, Roopa attempts to make amends and eventually confesses her love for Anand during a Dandiya festival night.

Later, Anand's mother discloses her husband's role in her parents' death to Roopa. Though deeply shaken by the revelation, Roopa chooses forgiveness over grief and resentment, accepting Anand's proposal.

== Cast ==
- Raja as Anand Singaraju
- Kamalinee Mukherjee as Roopa (voice-over by Sunitha)
- Anuj Gurwara as Rahul, Roopa's ex-fiancée
- Anish Kuruvilla as Raju, Anand's cousin (voice-over by Sekhar Kammula)
- Satya Krishnan as Anita, Roopa's friend
- Bakhitha Francis as Samatha, Anand's friend
- Chandana Chakrabarti as Rahul's mother
- Gopichand Lagadapati as Ram
- Gururaj Manepalli as Anand's father
- Shankar Melkote as Roopa's boss
- Sekhar Kammula as auto driver (cameo appearance)

== Production ==
=== Financing ===
After Sekhar Kammula's first venture, Dollar Dreams (2000), he began meeting producers with his stories. When he initially told them a story, they felt that it was too simple. Then, he began giving them a bound script of Anand. Unfortunately, none came forward to produce it. Upon someone's suggestion, Kammula approached National Film Development Corporation (NFDC) and they came forward to fund a part of the project. This set a precedent because it was the first time that NFDC entered into commercial Telugu cinema.

Anish Kuruvilla, who played Anand's cousin in the film, was the executive producer for the film and Kammula's following film, Godavari (2006).

=== Casting and locations ===
Kammula preferred actors who suit the roles than writing characters for established actors. Hence, the choice of the cast were non-established actors. The search process lasted 3 months. The casting for Raja was simple. Kammula wanted someone without melodrama in acting and it just came as a plus when Raja appreciated Kammula's directorial abilities. The choice for an actress made Kammula visit Mumbai and Bangalore, but he could not get the appropriate one. On knowing about Kamalinee Mukherjee, he subjected her to a screen test. After the test, he selected her as the actress in the lead role. The choice of location was first thought as Ramoji Film City and Nanakramguda in Hyderabad. So, these thoughts were quashed because the need was for a suitably big house and an outhouse situated adjacent to it. Since Kammula stayed in Padmarao Nagar, a prominent locality in Hyderabad, a location there made it all the more accessible for him.

=== Miscellaneous ===
Kammula's primary inspiration came from the Indian middle class. He was of the thought that this section of people were wrongly represented in films. He wanted to represent them appropriately and this was achieved with Anand.

Kammula sat with Veturi for writing songs for the film. Kammula said that he could see thousands of expressions expressed as a couple of words in lyrics. Eventually, they ended up with six beautiful songs penned by Veturi. For Anand, Veturi took a month to come up with the lyrics as against his usual penchant of coming up with lyrics spontaneously.

Being a Bengali, Kamalinee Mukherjee's voice was dubbed over for the film, this was provided by singer and television host, Sunitha. She later won a Nandi Award for Best Female Dubbing Artist.

With most of the cast not well-versed in speaking Telugu, Kammula faced challenges in their dialogue delivery. It just happened that most of the cast couldn't speak Telugu. The crew had to face a slight loss of the performance owing to this fact. To overcome this handicap, the dialogues were altered slightly to improve the actors' diction.

== Release ==
=== Critical acclaim and reviews ===
Anand had a relatively low-profile release unlike the huge banner releases of the Telugu film industry. It was made with a modest budget of less than ₹1 crore. Kammula wasn't sure of the outcome of the film and said "I knew that it would either be a huge hit or a huge flop". It evoked a decent response from the critics. Idlebrain.com gave the film a 3.75/5. The website review goes on to recommend this film to the film-going audiences. On the other hand, IndiaGlitz said that the film was "good, but could have been better". It also figured among the top five grossers in the Telugu film industry for the year 2004. The success of the films in India being measured in the number of days the film has been screened in the theatres, Anand completed 100 days of screening on 28 January 2005. Another website says that the film was realistic in its depiction and goes on to given instances in the film that do happen (unlike some of the fictitious and dreamy Indian films).

== Soundtrack ==
The film has six songs composed by K.M. Radha Krishnan, and according to one repository of Indian songs, "all the songs but for one assume classical and Carnatic music in it". All songs were written by Veturi.

No.	Title	Singer(s)	Length
1.	"Vachhe Vachhe"	Shreya Ghoshal	4:37
2.	"Yamunatheeram"	K.S.Chithra, Hariharan	4:10
3.	"Nuvvena Naa Nuvvena"	Shreya Ghoshal, K.M. Radha Krishnan	4:54
4.	"Charumati I Love You"	Lucky Ali	4:09
5.	"Telisi Telisi"	Shreya Ghoshal	4:28
6.	"Yedalo Ganam"	K.S.Chithra, Hariharan	4:55

== Awards ==
Nandi Awards - 2004

- Second Best Feature Film - Silver – Sekhar Kammula
- Best Director – Sekhar Kammula
- Best Actress – Kamalinee Mukherjee
- Best Supporting Actress – Satya Krishnan
- Best Child Artiste – Bakhita
- Best Female Dubbing Artist – Sunitha Upadrashta

Filmfare Awards South

Ceremony	Category	Nominee	Result	Ref.
52nd Filmfare Awards South	Best Film	Sekhar Kammula	Nominated	
52nd Filmfare Awards South	Best Director	Sekhar Kammula	Nominated	
52nd Filmfare Awards South	Best Actor – Female	Kamalinee Mukherjee	Nominated	
52nd Filmfare Awards South	Best Music	K. M. Radha Krishnan	Nominated	
52nd Filmfare Awards South	Best Supporting Actress	Satya Krishnan	Nominated	
