= Dollar Dreams =

2000 film by Sekhar Kammula

- Release Poster
- Directed by: Sekhar Kammula
- Written by: Sekhar Kammula
- Produced by: Sekhar Kammula
- Starring: Santosh Kumar; Anish Kuruvilla; Ravi Raju; Dr. Anil Prashant; Dashveer Singh; Priyanka Veer; Satya
- Cinematography: Vijay C. Kumar
- Edited by: Marthand K. Venkatesh
- Production company: Amigos Creations
- Distributed by: Amigos Creations
- Release date: 19 October 2000
- Running time: 100 minutes
- Country: India
- Languages: Telugu; English
- Budget: ₹16–20 lakh
- Box office: ₹ 16 Lakh

Dollar Dreams is a 2000 Indian drama film written, directed and produced by Sekhar Kammula in his directorial debut. Shot in Telugu and English, the film starred Santosh Kumar, Anish Kuruvilla, Ravi Raju, Anil Prashant, Dashveer Singh, Priyanka Veer, and Satya. The film explores the conflict between American dreams and human feelings.

Dollar Dreams was screened at the 33rd International Film Festival of India. It won the National Film Award for Best First Film of a Director at the 47th National Film Awards.

== Cast ==
- Santosh Kumar as Balu
- Anish Kuruvilla as Srinu
- Ravi Raju as Ravi
- Dr. Anil Prashant as Phani
- Dashveer Singh as Sardar
- Priyanka Veer as Usha
- Satya as Archana
- Manasa as She
- Gopal Krishna as Father
- Radha Krishna as Lakshmi
- Kushnaaz as Kamal
- Sekhar Kammula (cameo appearance)

== Production ==
Rediff.com cited Dollar Dreams as a take off from where Hyderabad Blues ends. The film re-introduced social realism to Telugu screen.
