= Happy Days (2007 film) =

Film by Sekhar Kammula

- Theatrical release poster
- Directed by: Sekhar Kammula
- Written by: Sekhar Kammula
- Produced by: Sekhar Kammula
- Starring: Varun Sandesh; Tamannaah Bhatia; Rahul Haridas; Nikhil Siddharth; Vamsee Krishna; Sonia Deepti; Gayatri Rao; Monali Chowdhary
- Cinematography: Vijay C. Kumar
- Edited by: Marthand K. Venkatesh
- Music by: Mickey J. Meyer
- Production company: Amigos Creations
- Distributed by: Amigos Creations
- Release dates: 28 September 2007 (United States); 2 October 2007 (India)
- Running time: 160 minutes
- Country: India
- Language: Telugu
- Budget: ₹2–3 crore
- Box office: est. ₹18 crore distributors' share

Happy Days is a 2007 Indian Telugu-language musical coming of age film written, produced and directed by Sekhar Kammula. The film features Varun Sandesh, Tamannaah Bhatia, Rahul Haridas, Nikhil Siddharth, Vamsee Krishna, Sonia Deepti, Gayatri Rao, and Monali Chowdhary in the lead roles.

The film follows eight diverse students pursuing engineering at CBIT navigating their four years of college life. It explores their friendships, rivalries, romantic relationships, and self-discovery, capturing the essence of campus experiences and the transition into adulthood.

The film received a positive response and was a huge box office success, redefining the coming-of-age college drama in Telugu cinema. The film won three Nandi Awards, and six Filmfare Awards. Happy Days is widely considered a modern classic of Telugu cinema, holding significant cultural impact, notably influencing many students to pursue engineering. The film was dubbed in Malayalam with same title and was remade in Kannada as Jolly Days and in Tamil as Inidhu Inidhu by actor Prakash Raj.

== Cast ==
- Varun Sandesh as Chandrashekar "Chandu"
- Tamannaah Bhatia as Madhu (voiced by Sunitha)
- Nikhil Siddharth as Rajesh
- Gayatri Rao as Aparna "Appu"
- Rahul Haridas as Arjun "Tyson"
- Sonia Deepti as Shravanthi "Shravs"
- Vamsee Chaganti as Shankar
- Monali Chowdhary as Sangeetha
- Gururaj Manepalli as the Dean of CBIT
- Krishnudu as Bandodu
- Ranadhir Reddy as Naveen
- Aadarsh Balakrishna as Sanjay
- Vamshi as Paidithalli
- Adithya as Praveen
- Shruti as Prashanthi
- Sandhya Janak as Madhu's mother

Cameo appearance

- Kamalinee Mukherjee as Shreya Madam

== Production ==
=== Casting ===
Sekhar Kammula held a talent search at Big FM and idlebrain.com and managed to select seven of the eight lead actors. He had to cast Tamannaah Bhatia as a suitable actress was not found. The main lead of the film, Varun Sandesh, was selected using the internet without any direct audition. He sent his photograph by e-mail in response to the idlebrain.com advertisement and subsequently sent a video clip of himself enacting certain scenes along with a song. Damidi Kamalakar Reddy, founding Secretary and Treasurer of Chaitanya Engineering College, acted as a Professor/Lecturer in a brief cameo role.

=== Filming ===
Most of the shooting took place at Chaitanya Bharathi Institute of Technology (CBIT) and Mahatma Gandhi Institute of Technology (MGIT). The opening scene between Appu and Rajesh was shot in MGIT with select scenes shot outdoors. Sekhar being an alumnus of CBIT, found it to be a suitable location. He had to arrange a special screening of Anand to the chairman of CBIT and its board members to convince them for an on-site shoot. Apparently, after watching Anand, the board granted their permission to shoot the film.

=== Cost-cutting measures ===
Sekhar Kammula cut costs of producing the film through various methods. By casting newcomers, he reduced expenses to a reasonable level. As most of the shooting took place in the college, there was no need to construct sets. By partnering with Pantaloon Group, he saved an additional ₹10 lakh on the costumes budget.

== Music ==
Music was composed by Mickey J Meyer and released by Big Music. The audio launch took place at Annapurna Studios on 24 August 2007, 100 students selected from various colleges in Hyderabad attended. The guests for the evening included BN Reddy (CBIT), Kamalakar Reddy (CBIT), Dil Raju, Sekhar Kammula, Ravi Naidu (BIG Music), Mahesh Kumar (Reliance business head), Ilayaraja, Swapna, C Vijaya Kumar, Ashok and the star cast. BN Reddy launched the audio CD and gave the first unit to Kamalakar Reddy.

Mickey J Meyer won the Filmfare Award for Best Music Director – Telugu and Nandi Award for Best Music Director for this soundtrack.

Happy Days

Soundtrack album by Mickey J Meyer
- Released: 24 August 2007
- Recorded: 2007
- Genre: Soundtrack
- Length: 28:27
- Language: Telugu
- Label: T-Series
- Producer: Mickey J Meyer

Mickey J Meyer chronology
10th Class (2006)	Happy Days (2007)	Hare Ram (2008)

Telugu Track-List
No.	Title	Lyrics	Singer(s)	Length
1.	"Arere Arere"	Vanamali	Karthik	4:59
2.	"Jill Jill Jiga"	Venkatesh Patvari	Krishna Chaitanya, Kranti, Aditya Siddharth, Sashi Kiran	4:34
3.	"Happy Days Title Track"	Veturi	Mickey J. Meyer, Harshika	3:51
4.	"Ya Kundendu"	Traditional	Pranavi	1:24
5.	"Ye Cheekati"	Vanamali	Ranjith, Sunitha Sarathy	4:45
6.	"O My Friend"	Vanamali	Karthik	5:03
7.	"Happy Days" (Rock Version)	Veturi	Naresh Iyer, Mickey J. Meyer	3:51
8.	"Ninna Chusi"		Karthik	2:58
Total length:				30:25

Happy Days

Soundtrack album by Mickey J Meyer
- Released: 2007
- Recorded: 2007
- Genre: Soundtrack
- Length: 21:01
- Language: Malayalam
- Labels: Redakh Arts; Universal Music India
- Producer: Mickey J Meyer

All tracks are written by Siju Thuravoor.

Malayalam Track-List
No.	Title	Singer(s)	Length
1.	"Ayyayyo"	Karthik	4:36
2.	"Vida Chollam"	Anu Pravin, Shobha	3:52
3.	"Unarukayayi"	Vidhu Prathap	4:31
4.	"Manasinnu Marayilla"	Ajay Satyan	4:59
5.	"Ee Theeppori"	Manjari, Ranjith	3:03
Total length:			21:01

== Release ==
Happy Days was released on 28 September 2007 in the United States and 2 October 2007 in India.

== Reception ==
=== Critical response ===
The film received positive reviews for its fresh story, cast, screenplay, and songs. A critic from Rediff.com wrote that "Don't miss Happy Days for you will be reminded of the days gone by. Savour that nostalgia as Sekhar gives you ample amount of it". Jeevi of Idlebrain.com wrote that "If he sticks to his sensibilities, Sekhar Kammula can never make a bad film. Go and watch Happy Days."

== Awards ==
Filmfare Awards South – 2008

- Best film – Sekhar Kammula
- Best Director – Sekhar Kammula
- Best Supporting Actress – Sonia Deepti
- Best Music Director – Mickey J. Meyer
- Best Lyricist – Vanamali ("Arere Arere")
- Best Male Playback Singer – Karthik ("Arere Arere")

Nandi Awards – 2008

- Second Best Feature Film - Silver – Sekhar Kammula
- Best Music Director – Mickey J Meyer
- Best Male Playback Singer – Karthik ("Oh My Friend")

CineMAA Awards – 2008

- Best Film – Sekhar Kammula
- Best Director – Sekhar Kammula
- Best Story – Sekhar Kammula
- Best Screenplay – Sekhar Kammula
- Best Music – Mickey J Meyer
- Best Lyricist – Vanamali ("Arere Arere")
- Best Lyricist – Veturi
- Best Male Singer – Karthik ("Arere Arere")

== Dubbed versions and remakes ==
The film was dubbed into Malayalam as Happy Days Once in Life and remade in Kannada as Jolly Days and released in 2008. Both versions proved to be successful. The Tamil remake, Inidhu Inidhu (2010), was directed by noted cinematographer K. V. Guhan under actor Prakash Raj's Duet Movies banner. Mickey J. Meyer was retained as the music director for both films and the project was his first venture in each language, respectively.

In 2014, there were speculations that a Hindi remake of Happy Days would be directed by Sekhar himself, and would be co-produced by Salman Khan. However, there were no further updates.

Awards
Preceded by Bommarillu	Filmfare Best Film Award (Telugu); 2007	Succeeded by Gamyam
