= Filmfare Award for Best Music Director – Telugu =

Indian annual film music award

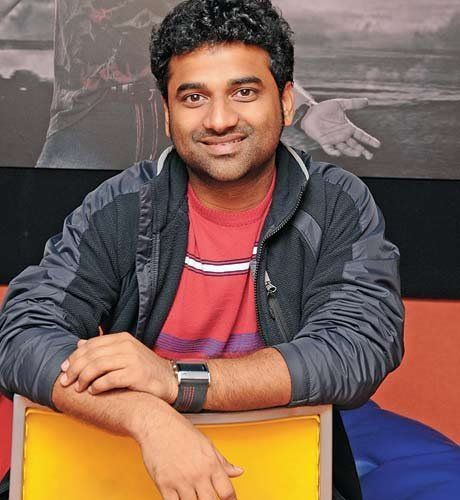
- The 2024 recipient: Devi Sri Prasad
- Awarded for: Best work by a music composer in Telugu films
- Country: India
- Presented by: Filmfare
- First award: Ilaiyaraaja for Bobbili Raja (1990)
- Currently held by: Devi Sri Prasad for Pushpa 2: The Rule (2024)

Highlights
- Most wins: Devi Sri Prasad (10)

The Filmfare Award for Best Music Director – Telugu is given in India by the Filmfare magazine as part of its annual Filmfare Awards for Telugu films. Here is a list of the award winners and the films for which they won.

== Superlatives ==
Superlative	Recipient	Record
Most awards	Devi Sri Prasad	10
Second most winner	M. M. Keeravani	8

== Winners ==
Year	Music Director	Film
2024	Devi Sri Prasad	Pushpa 2: The Rule
2023	Vijai Bulganin	Baby
2022	M. M. Keeravani	RRR
2020 / 21	Devi Sri Prasad	Pushpa: The Rise
2019	AWARDS FUNCTION WAS SUSPENDED DUE TO COVID-19 PANDEMIC	
2018	Devi Sri Prasad	Rangasthalam
2017	M. M. Keeravani	Baahubali 2: The Conclusion
2016	Devi Sri Prasad	Nannaku Prematho
2015	Devi Sri Prasad	Srimanthudu
2014	Anoop Rubens	Manam
2013	Devi Sri Prasad	Atharintiki Daaredi
2012	Devi Sri Prasad	Gabbar Singh
2011	S. Thaman	Dookudu
2010	A. R. Rahman	Ye Maaya Chesave
2009	M. M. Keeravani	Magadheera
2008	Mickey J. Meyer	Kotha Bangaru Lokam
2007	Mickey J. Meyer	Happy Days
2006	Devi Sri Prasad	Bommarillu
2005	Devi Sri Prasad	Nuvvostanante Nenoddantana
2004	Devi Sri Prasad	Varsham
2003	Mani Sharma	Okkadu
2002	R. P. Patnaik	Santosham
2001	R. P. Patnaik	Nuvvu Nenu
2000	Mani Sharma	Chirunavvutho
1999	S.A. Rajkumar	Raja
1998	Mani Sharma	Choodalani Vundi
1997	Vandemataram Srinivas	Osey Ramulamma
1996	M. M. Keeravani	Pelli Sandadi
1995	M. M. Keeravani	Subha Sankalpam
1994	M. M. Keeravani	Criminal
1993	M. M. Keeravani	Allari Priyudu
1992	K. V. Mahadevan	Swathi Kiranam
1991	M. M. Keeravani	Kshana Kshanam
1990	Ilaiyaraaja	Bobbili Raja
