= Anish Kuruvilla =

Indian actor and director

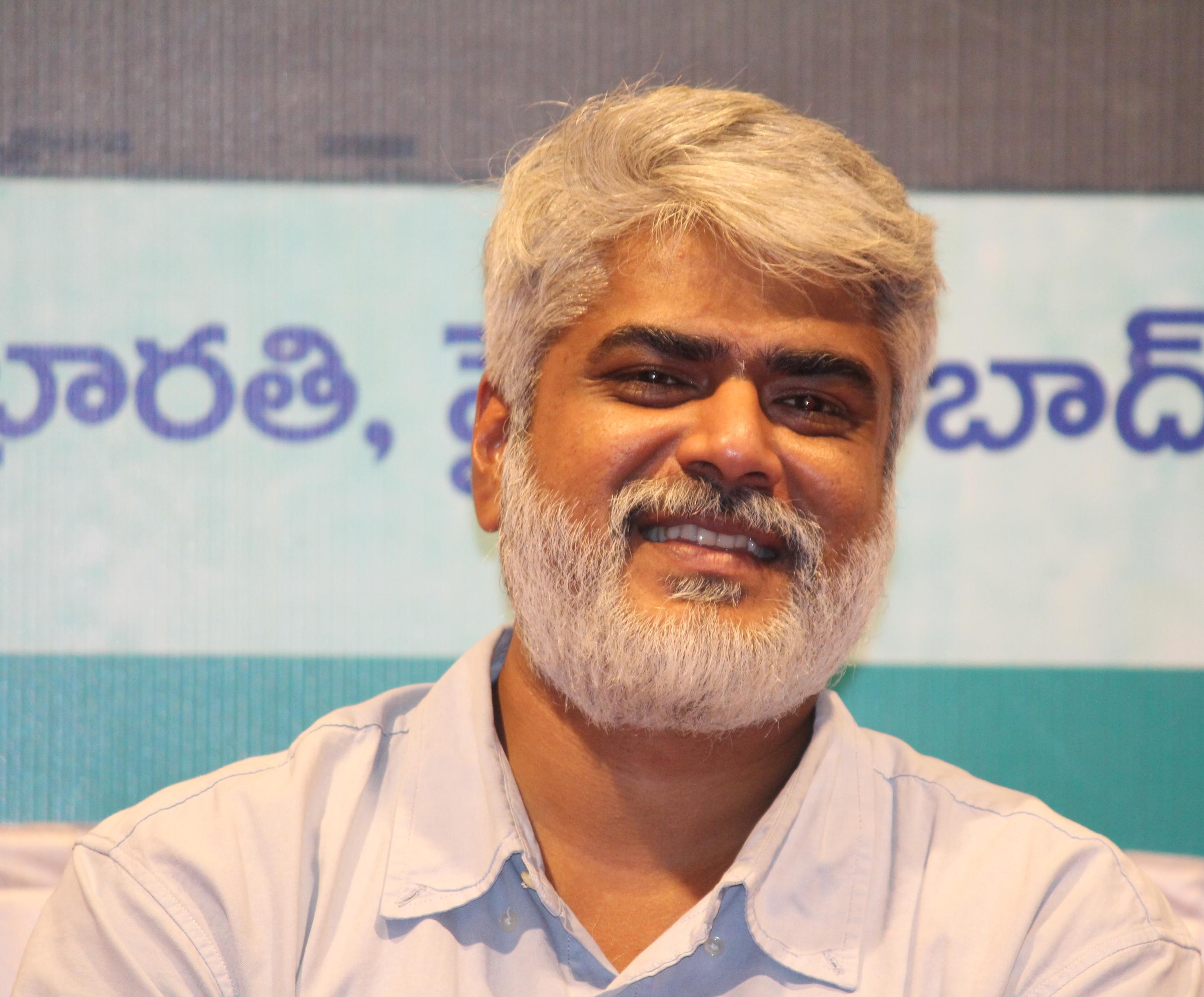
- Kuruvilla in a press meet
- Born: Anish Yohan Kuruvilla; Hyderabad, Andhra Pradesh, India (now Telangana, India)
- Occupations: Actor, director

Anish Yohan Kuruvilla is an Indian actor and director who predominantly works in Telugu cinema. Before becoming a director, he was an executive producer with Sekhar Kammula, played the lead role in Dollar Dreams (2000), and played a supporting role in Anand (2004). After taking a break from acting for 12 years, he played a crucial role in the 2016 film Pelli Choopulu. He also appeared in the biographical film of Indian cricketer M. S. Dhoni.

== Early life ==
Kuruvilla was born into a Malayali family and grew up in Hyderabad. He attended The Hyderabad Public School, Ramanthapur.

== Career ==
Kuruvilla played the lead role in Sekhar Kammula's debut film Dollar Dreams (2000), and a supporting role in the film Anand (2004). He worked with Nagesh Kukunoor and Manishankar before his directorial debut, Avakai Biryani (2008), which was produced by Sekhar Kammula. His second directorial film was Ko Antey Koti (2012), produced by Sharwanand, who was also the lead actor. After his directorial ventures, he returned to acting with the 2016 film, Pelli Choopulu.

== Filmography ==
=== Telugu ===
†	Denotes films that have not yet been released

Year	Title	Role	Notes
2000	Dollar Dreams	Srinu	English-Telugu bilingual film; also assistant director
2004	Anand	Raju	Also executive producer and assistant director
2006	Godavari	—N/a	Also executive producer and assistant director
2016	Pelli Choopulu	Businessman	
2017	Nenu Local	College Principal	
2017	Jawaan	DRDO scientist	
2017	Hello	Priya's father	
2018	Bharat Ane Nenu	Srivastava	
2018	Tej I Love You	Nandini's father	
2018	Goodachari	Damodar	
2018	Anaganaga O Premakatha	Ananya's father	
2019	Maharshi	Venkatraman	
2019	Game Over	Psychiatrist	
2019	Rajdooth	Priya's father	
2019	Gang Leader	Police Officer	
2019	Operation Gold Fish	Anish Kuruvilla	
2020	Choosi Choodangaane	Siddu's father	
2020	Neevalle Nenunna		
2020	Madha	Gopal	
2020	Orey Bujjiga	Project Manager	
2021	Alludu Adhurs	Sreenu's father	
2021	Pitta Kathalu	Broski	
2021	Gaali Sampath	Bank Auditor	
2021	Vakeel Saab	Zarina's manager	
2021	Wild Dog	Vinod	
2021	Thank You Brother	Mr. Prem	
2022	Major	Taj Hotel Manager Rodriguez	
2022	Sita Ramam	Nizam Advisor	
2022	Crazy Fellow	Abhiram's brother	
2022	Urvasivo Rakshasivo	Sree and Sinduja's boss	
2022	Sasanasabha		
2022	Dhamaka	Police DGP	
2023	Waltair Veerayya	Navy Officer	
2023	Michael	Rathan	
2023	Agent	Ramesh	Uncredited role
2023	Kanulu Therichinaa Kanulu Moosinaa	RK	
2023	Spark Life	Army Chief	
2024	Operation Valentine	Indian Security Advisor	
2024	Tillu Square	IB Chief	
2024	Simbaa	Dr. Irani	
2024	Fear		
2024	Srikakulam Sherlock Holmes	CI Bhaskar	
2025	Mad Square	Vikram Saheb	
2025	Akhanda 2: Thaandavam	Defence Minister Rao	
2025	12A Railway Colony	Jayadev Shinde	
2025	Drive	Siddque	
2026	Mrithyunjay	Saadhu’s target	
2026	Gaayapadda Simham	Gayathri’s father	

=== Other languages ===
Year	Title	Role	Language
2016	M. S. Dhoni - The Untold Story	BCCI Committee member	Hindi
2017	Velaikkaran	Jayaram	Tamil
2019	The Accidental Prime Minister	T. K. A. Nair	Hindi
2019	Vijay Superum Pournamiyum	Sonam's father	Malayalam
2019	Game Over	Psychiatrist	Tamil
2019	Bigil	Delhi Police officer	Tamil
2020	Kannum Kannum Kollaiyadithaal	Sooraj Mehta	Tamil
2021	Oh Manapenne!	Aditi's father	Tamil
2022	Major	Taj Hotel Manager Rodriguez	Hindi
2022	DSP	Police commissioner	Tamil
2022	Vijayanand	AJ	Kannada
2023	Tiger 3	Indian Prime Minister	Hindi

=== Television ===
Year	Title	Role	Language	Network	Notes
2019	Gods of Dharmapuri	Mr. Rao	Telugu	ZEE5	Also director
2023	MY3	Rajashekhar	Tamil	Disney+ Hotstar	
2023	Dhootha	Anand Varma Avudhuri	Telugu	Amazon Prime Video	
2024	Brinda		Telugu	SonyLIV	

=== As director ===
Year	Title	Language	Notes
2007	Confessions of a filmmaker	Telugu	
2008	Avakai Biryani	Telugu	
2012	Ko Antey Koti	Telugu	
2019	Gods of Dharmapuri	Telugu	Also actor; ZEE5 web series
2024	The Mystery of Moksha Island	Telugu	Disney+Hotstar web series
