= Mickey J. Meyer =

Indian music composer and singer

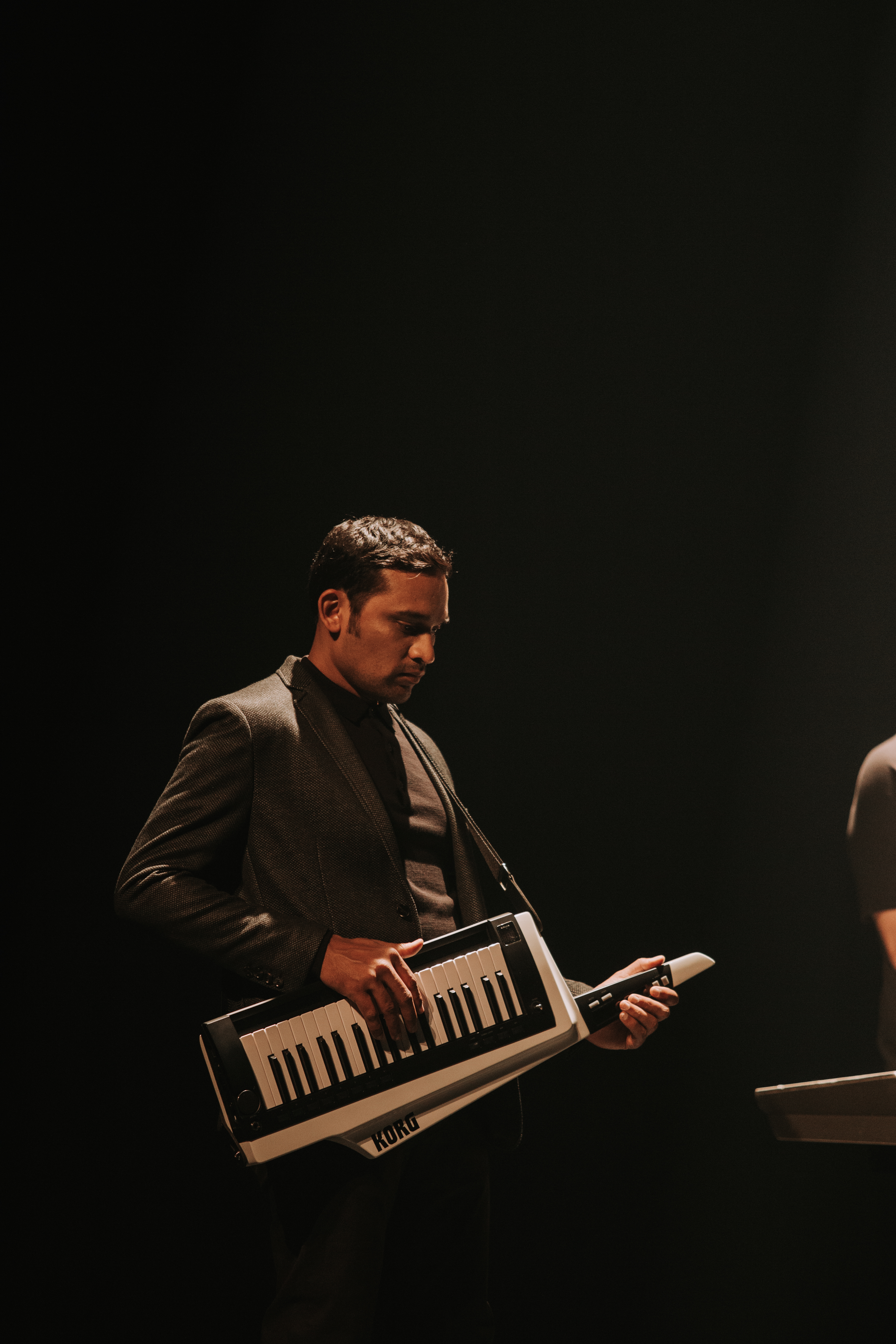
- Meyer in 2018

Background information
- Born: December 1, 1982 (age 43)
- Origin: Hyderabad, Telangana, India
- Occupations: Film composer, music director, singer
- Instruments: Vocals, keyboard, violin, piano
- Years active: 2005–present
- Website: https://mickeyjmeyer.com/

Mickey J. Meyer, is an Indian composer and singer known for his works predominantly in Telugu Cinema. He has received two Filmfare Awards South, and three state Nandi Awards for the Best Music Direction. An alumnus of Trinity College of Music, Meyer started his career in 2005 and composed music for films such as Happy Days (2007), Kotha Bangaru Lokam (2008), Leader (2010), A Aa (2016) and Shyam Singha Roy (2021).

== Early life and career ==
Meyer was born in Hyderabad. As a child, Meyer learned piano and violin. Since he was trained in carnatic music, he sang ghazals for All India Radio. He studied at Trinity College of Music in London. After being inspired by A. R. Rahman, he took up a career in music. Tammareddy Bharadwaja gave him a chance for the film Pothe Poni (2006) before he received his breakthrough with Happy Days (2007).

== Discography ==
- The films are listed in order of the music release, regardless of the film release.

Year	Film	Language	Notes
2005	Pothe Poni	Telugu	
2006	10th Class	Telugu	
2006	Notebook	Telugu	
2007	Happy Days	Telugu	Winner, Filmfare Best Music Director Award (Telugu); Winner, Nandi Award for Best Music Director
2008	Hare Ram	Telugu	
2008	Kotha Bangaru Lokam	Telugu	Winner, Filmfare Best Music Director Award (Telugu); Winner, Nandi Award for Best Music Director
2009	Jolly Days	Kannada	Remake of Happy Days
2009	Cheluvina Chilipili	Kannada	Remake of Kotha Bangaru Lokam
2009	Ganesh	Telugu	
2010	Leader	Telugu	Nominated, Filmfare Best Music Director Award (Telugu)
2010	Maro Charitra	Telugu	
2010	Inidhu Inidhu	Tamil	Remake of Happy Days
2011	Anaganaga O Dheerudu	Telugu	Only one song; "Chandamamala"
2012	Life is Beautiful	Telugu	Nominated; Filmfare Best Music Director Award (Telugu)
2012	Routine Love Story	Telugu	
2013	Seethamma Vakitlo Sirimalle Chettu	Telugu	Only songs Nominated; Filmfare Best Music Director Award (Telugu)
2014	Chandamama Kathalu	Telugu	
2014	Subramanyam For Sale	Telugu	
2014	Chakkiligintha	Telugu	
2014	Mukunda	Telugu	
2015	Kerintha	Telugu	
2015	Buguri	Kannada	
2016	Brahmotsavam	Telugu	Only songs
2016	A Aa	Telugu	Nominated; Filmfare Best Music Director Award (Telugu); Winner, Nandi Award for Best Music Director
2016	Okka Ammayi Thappa	Telugu	
2017	Shatamanam Bhavati	Telugu	Nominated; Filmfare Best Music Director Award (Telugu)
2017	Mister	Telugu	
2018	Mahanati	Telugu	Winner; B. Nagi Reddy Award for Best Music Composer – Mahanati; Nominated: Filmfare Best Music Director – Mahanati (Telugu)
2018	Srinivasa Kalyanam	Telugu	
2019	Oh! Baby	Telugu	
2019	Gaddalakonda Ganesh	Telugu	
2019	Iddari Lokam Okate	Telugu	
2021	Pitta Kathalu	Telugu	Only for Meera segment
2021	Sreekaram	Telugu	
2021	Shyam Singha Roy	Telugu	
2023	Ramabanam	Telugu	
2023	Anni Manchi Sakunamule	Telugu	
2023	Gandeevadhari Arjuna	Telugu	
2023	Peddha Kapu 1	Telugu	
2024	Operation Valentine	Telugu; Hindi	Debut in Hindi cinema
2024	Mr. Bachchan	Telugu	
2025	HIT: The Third Case	Telugu	
2025	Champion	Telugu	
2026	Anaganaga Oka Raju	Telugu	
2026	Sathi Leelavathi	Telugu	

== Awards ==
Nandi Awards

2007: Best Music Director – Happy Days

2008: Best Music Director – Kotha Bangaru Lokam

2016: Best Music Director – A Aa

Filmfare Awards South

2007: Best Music Director – Telugu – Happy Days

2008: Best Music Director – Telugu – Kotha Bangaru Lokam

CineMAA Awards

2007: Best Music Director – Happy Days
