= List of awards and nominations received by Allu Arjun =

Allu Arjun awards and nominations
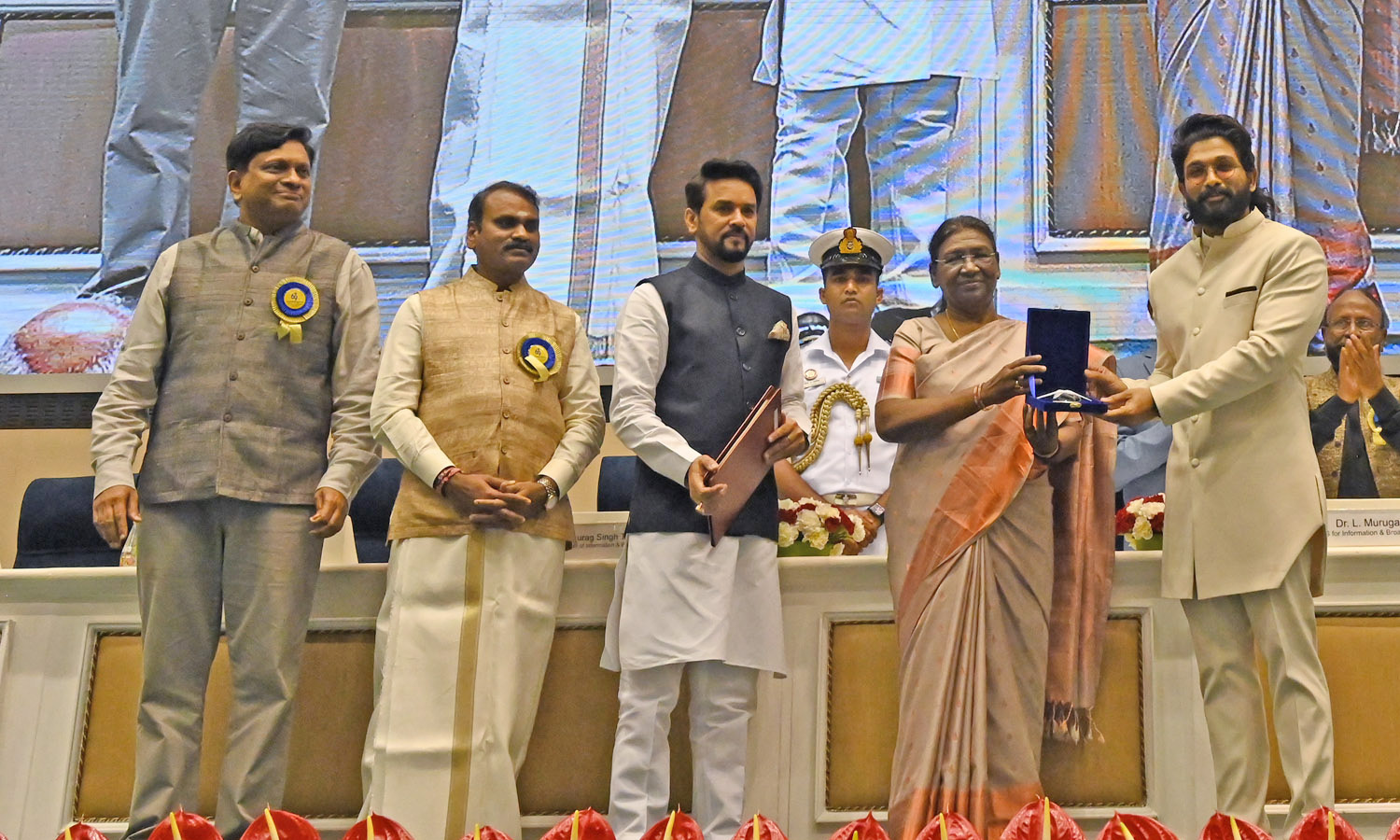
- Allu Arjun winning his maiden National Award for Pushpa: The Rise
Awards and nominations
Award	Wins	Nominations
CineMAA Awards	6	6
Filmfare Awards South	7	11
IIFA Utsavam	1	3
Mirchi Music Awards South	1	2
Nandi Awards	5	0
Sakshi Excellence Awards	2	0
National Film Awards	1	0
Santosham Film Awards	3	1
South Indian International Movie Awards	5	7
South Scope Lifestyle Awards	3	0
TSR– TV9 National Film Awards	1	0
Zee Cine Awards Telugu	1	2

Totals (Note: Certain award groups do not simply award one winner. They acknowledge several different recipients, have runners-up, and have third place. Since this is a specific recognition and is different from losing an award, runner-up mentions are considered wins in this award tally. For simplification and to avoid errors, each award in this list has been presumed to have had a prior nomination.)
- Wins: 50
- Nominations: 10

Allu Arjun is an Indian actor and media personality who works in Telugu cinema. He has established as one of the popular celebrities in India and also one of the highest paid actors in India. Arjun is also widely known for his dancing and has appeared in more than 20 films. His performance in the films such as Arya (2004), Desamuduru (2007), Parugu (2008), Vedam (2010), Race Gurram (2014), Rudhramadevi (2015) and Ala Vaikunthapurramuloo (2020) fetched him various accolades including six CineMAA Awards, seven Filmfare South Awards, three Nandi Awards and three SIIMA awards.

== CineMAA Awards ==
Year	Nominated work	Category	Result	Ref.
2004	Gangotri	Best Male Debut	Won	
2005	Arya	Best Actor – Jury	Won	
2008	Desamuduru	Best Actor – Jury	Won	
2009	Parugu	Best Actor	Won	
2015	Race Gurram	Best Actor	Won	
2016	Rudhramadevi	Best Actor – Jury	Won	

== Filmfare Awards South ==
Year	Nominated work	Category	Result	Ref.
2005	Arya	Best Actor – Telugu	Nominated	
2008	Desamuduru	Best Actor – Telugu	Nominated	
2009	Parugu	Best Actor – Telugu	Won	
2010	Arya 2	Best Actor – Telugu	Nominated	
2011	Vedam	Best Actor – Telugu	Won	
2015	Race Gurram	Best Actor – Telugu	Won	
2016	S/O Satyamurthy	Best Actor – Telugu	Nominated	
2016	Rudhramadevi	Best Supporting Actor – Telugu	Won	
2017	Sarrainodu	Best Actor – Telugu	Nominated	
2017	Sarrainodu	Critics Best Actor – Telugu	Won	
2022	Pushpa: The Rise	Best Actor – Telugu	Won	
2026	Pushpa 2: The Rule	Best Actor – Telugu	Won	

== Gaddar Telangana Film Awards ==
Year	Nominated work	Category	Result	Ref.
2025	Pushpa 2: The Rule	Best Actor	Won	

== IIFA Utsavam ==
Year	Nominated work	Category	Result	Ref.
2016	S/O Satyamurthy	Performance In A Leading Role – Male	Nominated	
2017	Sarrainodu	Performance In A Leading Role – Male	Nominated	
2017	Rudhramadevi	Performance In A Supporting Role – Male	Won	

== Mirchi Music Awards South ==
Year	Nominated work	Category	Result	Ref.
2015	Race Gurram	Youth Icon of the Year	Won	

== Nandi Awards ==
Year	Nominated work	Category	Result	Ref.
2003	Gangotri	Special Jury Award	Won	
2004	Arya	Special Jury Award	Won	
2008	Parugu	Special Jury Award	Won	
2010	Vedam	Special Jury Award	Won	
2015	Rudhramadevi	Best Character Actor	Won	

== National Film Awards ==
Year	Nominated work	Category	Result	Ref.
2023	Pushpa: The Rise	Best Actor	Won	

== Sakshi Excellence Awards ==
Year	Nominated work	Category	Result	Ref.
2017	Sarrainodu	Most Popular Actor of the Year – Male	Won	
2021	Ala Vaikunthapurramuloo	Most Popular Actor of the Year – Male	Won	
2022	Pushpa: The Rise	Most Popular Actor of the Year – Male	Won	
2025	Pushpa 2: The Rule	Most Popular Actor of the Year – Male	Won	

== Santosham Film Awards ==
Year	Nominated work	Category	Result	Ref.
2004	Gangotri	Best Male Debut	Won	
2005	Arya	Best Young Performer	Won	
2006	Bunny	Best Young Performer	Won	
2021	Pushpa: The Rise	Best Actor	Won	

== South Indian International Movie Awards ==
Year	Nominated work	Category	Result
2013	Julayi	Best Actor – Telugu	Nominated
2015	Race Gurram	Best Actor – Telugu	Nominated
2015		Stylish Youth Icon of South Indian Cinema (Male)	Won
2016	Rudhramadevi	Best Actor (Critics) – Telugu	Won
2016	Rudhramadevi	Best Actor – Telugu	Nominated
2021	Ala Vaikunthapurramuloo	Best Actor – Telugu	Won
2022	Pushpa: The Rise	Best Actor – Telugu	Won
2025	Pushpa: The Rule	Best Actor – Telugu	Won

== Gulf Academy Movie Awards (GAMA) ==
Year	Nominated work	Category	Result	Ref.
2025	Pushpa: The Rise	Best Actor	Won	

== South Scope Lifestyle Awards ==
Year	Nominated work	Category	Result	Ref.
2009	Parugu	Best Actor	Won	
2010	Arya 2	Best Stylish Actor	Won	
2011	Vedam	Best Actor	Won	

== TSR– TV9 National Film Awards ==
Year	Nominated work	Category	Result	Ref.
2015	Race Gurram	Best Hero	Won	
2017	S/O Satyamurthy	Best Hero	Won	
2017	Rudhramadevi	Best Outstanding Performance	Won	

== Zee Cine Awards Telugu ==
Year	Nominated work	Category	Result	Ref.
2017	DJ: Duvvada Jagannadham	Favorite Actor	Won	
