= List of accolades received by Eega =

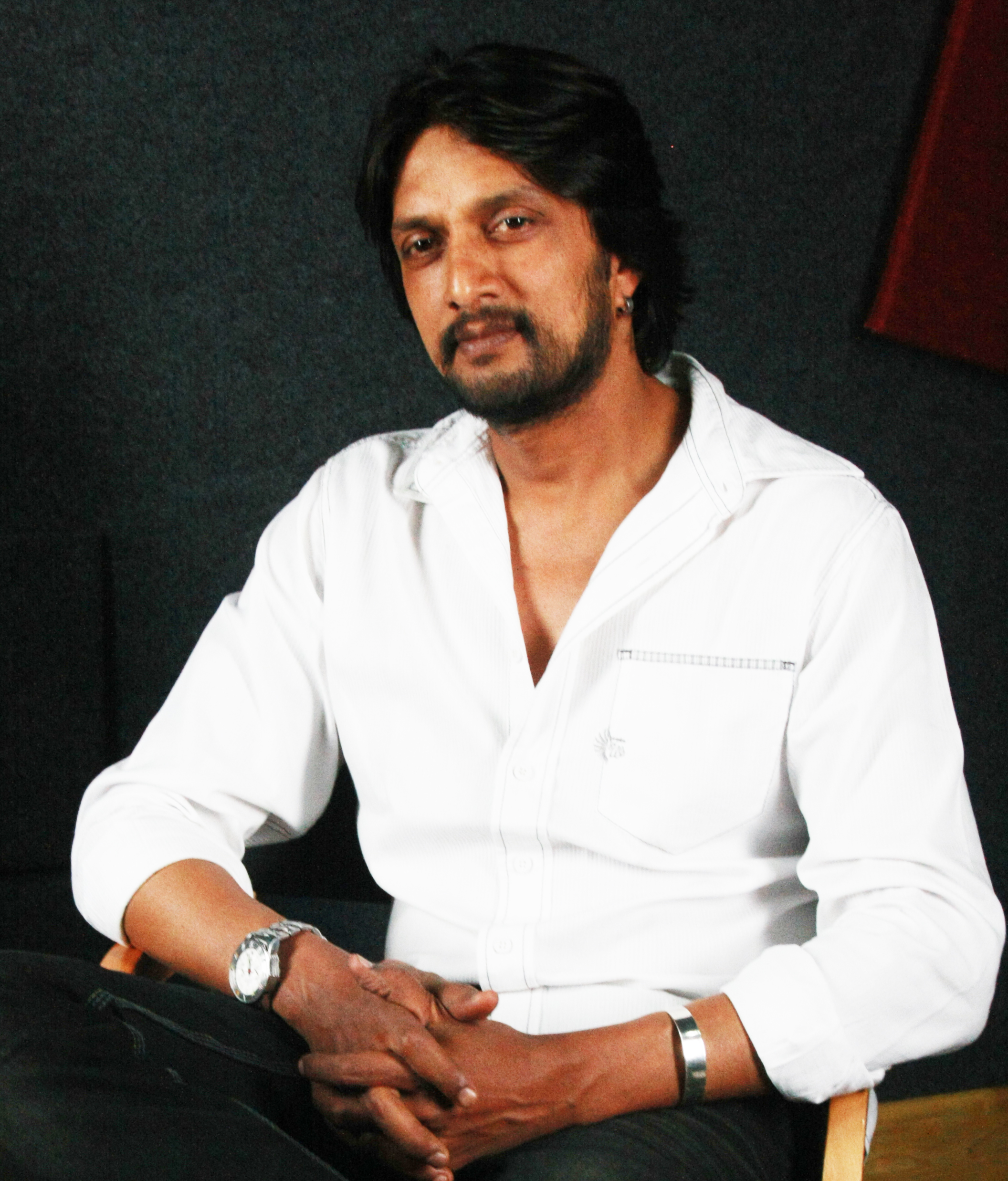
- Sudeep received many awards and nominations for his performance in the film including the Filmfare Award for Best Supporting Actor – Telugu.
Accolades
Award	Won	Nominated
National Film Awards	2	2
Filmfare Awards South	5	7
SIIMA	3	8
CineMAA Awards	4	4
Santosham Film Awards	1	1
Mirchi Music Awards South	1	1
Toronto After Dark Film Festival	9	9
Nandi Awards	8	8
Madrid International Film Festival	0	6
Fantaspoa Film Festival	1	1
B. Nagi Reddy Award	1	1
TSR – TV9 National Film Awards	2	1
- Total number of awards and nominations
Totals	38	50
- References

Eega (English: The Fly) is a 2012 Indian bilingual fantasy film written by V. Vijayendra Prasad and directed by his son, S. S. Rajamouli. It was produced by Korrapati Ranganatha Sai's Varahi Chalana Chitram with an estimated budget of ₹260 to 400 million, and was made simultaneously in Telugu and Tamil, the latter as Naan Ee (I, Housefly). The film stars Nani, Sudeep, and Samantha Ruth Prabhu. M. M. Keeravani composed the soundtrack and score. K. K. Senthil Kumar was director of photography and Kotagiri Venkateswara Rao edited the film. Janardhan Maharshi and Crazy Mohan wrote the dialogue for the Telugu and Tamil versions, respectively.

The narrative of Eega is in the form of a bedtime story told by a father to his daughter. Its protagonist is Nani, who is in love with his neighbour Bindu. Nani is murdered by a wealthy businessman named Sudeep, who is attracted to Bindu and considers Nani a rival. Nani reincarnates as a housefly and tries to protect Bindu while avenging his death.

The idea for the film originated in the 1990s from a conversation in which Prasad joked with Rajamouli about the idea of a fly seeking revenge against a human. Rajamouli reconsidered the idea after finishing Maryada Ramanna (2010), and Prasad developed it into a script. The film's production began on 7 December 2010 at Ramanaidu Studios in Hyderabad. Principal photography began on 22 February 2011 and continued until late February 2012. Makuta VFX and Annapurna Studios oversaw Eega's visual effects and digital intermediate process, respectively.

The two versions of the film, alongside a Malayalam-dubbed version titled Eecha, were released on 6 July 2012 in approximately 1,100 screens globally. The performances of the principal cast, Rajamouli's direction, and visual effects received critical acclaim upon release. Eega was one of the highest-grossing Telugu film of the year, earning more than ₹1.25 billion. Its Hindi-dubbed version, Makkhi, which was released on 12 October 2012, was not as commercially successful as the others. Eega won two National Film Awards (Best Feature Film in Telugu and Best Special Effects), five Filmfare Awards, and three South Indian International Movie Awards. It was screened at the Toronto After Dark Film Festival, the Shanghai International Film Festival, and the Madrid International Film Festival.

== Awards and nominations ==
Ceremony	Category	Nominee	Result
60th National Film Awards 2012	Best Special Effects	Makuta VFX	Won
60th National Film Awards 2012	Best Feature Film Telugu	Korrapati Ranganatha Sai	Won
B. Nagi Reddy Award 2012	Best Wholesome Entertainment Telugu Film Award	Korrapati Ranganatha Sai	Won
TSR – TV9 National Film Awards 2012-13	Best Actress	Samantha Ruth Prabhu	Won
TSR – TV9 National Film Awards 2012-13	Best Actor Kannada	Sudeep	Won
TSR – TV9 National Film Awards 2012-13	Best Villain	Sudeep	Nominated
2nd South Indian International Movie Awards	Best Film (Telugu)	Korrapati Ranganatha Sai	Won
2nd South Indian International Movie Awards	Best Director (Telugu)	S. S. Rajamouli	Nominated
2nd South Indian International Movie Awards	Best Cinematographer (Telugu)	K. K. Senthil Kumar	Won
2nd South Indian International Movie Awards	Best Actress (Telugu)	Samantha Ruth Prabhu	Nominated
2nd South Indian International Movie Awards	Best Actor in a Negative Role (Telugu)	Sudeep	Won
2nd South Indian International Movie Awards	Best Music Director (Telugu)	M. M. Keeravani	Nominated
2nd South Indian International Movie Awards	Best Lyricist (Telugu)	Ramajogayya Sastry for ''Eega Eega Eega''	Nominated
2nd South Indian International Movie Awards	Best Debutant Producer	Korrapati Ranganatha Sai	Nominated
CineMAA Awards 2013	Family Entertainer of the Year	Korrapati Ranganatha Sai	Won
CineMAA Awards 2013	Best Actor – Female	Samantha	Won
CineMAA Awards 2013	Best Villain	Sudeep	Won
CineMAA Awards 2013	Best Visual Effects	Makuta VFX	Won
60th Filmfare Awards South	Best Film	Korrapati Ranganatha Sai	Won
60th Filmfare Awards South	Best Director	S. S. Rajamouli	Won
60th Filmfare Awards South	Best Actress	Samantha	Won
60th Filmfare Awards South	Best Supporting Actor	Sudeep	Won
60th Filmfare Awards South	Best Music Director	M. M. Keeravani	Nominated
60th Filmfare Awards South	Best Male Playback Singer	Deepu – ''Nene Nani Ne''	Nominated
60th Filmfare Awards South	Best Special Effects	Makuta VFX	Won
Santosham Film Awards 2013	Best Actress	Samantha	Won
Mirchi Music Awards South 2012	Best Sound Mixing	Jeevan Babu – ''Nene Nani Ne"	Won
Fantaspoa Film Festival	Best Art Direction	Ravinder Reddy	Won
Madrid International Film Festival	Best Film	Korrapati Ranganatha Sai	Nominated
Madrid International Film Festival	Best Cinematographer	K.K. Senthil Kumar	Nominated
Madrid International Film Festival	Best Special Effects	Makuta VFX	Nominated
Madrid International Film Festival	Best Music Composer	M.M. Keeravani	Nominated
Madrid International Film Festival	Best Supporting Actor	Sudeep	Nominated
Madrid International Film Festival	Best Editor	Kotagiri Venkateswara Rao	Nominated
8th Toronto After Dark Film Festival	Best Action Film	Kotagiri Venkateswara Rao	Won
8th Toronto After Dark Film Festival	Best Comedy	Kotagiri Venkateswara Rao	Won
8th Toronto After Dark Film Festival	Most Original Film	Kotagiri Venkateswara Rao	Won
8th Toronto After Dark Film Festival	Best Special Effects	Kotagiri Venkateswara Rao	Won
8th Toronto After Dark Film Festival	Best Fight (Fly/Nami vs Sudeep Throughout the Film)	Kotagiri Venkateswara Rao	Won
8th Toronto After Dark Film Festival	Best Film to Watch With a Crowd	Kotagiri Venkateswara Rao	Won
8th Toronto After Dark Film Festival	Best Editing	Kotagiri Venkateswara Rao	Won
8th Toronto After Dark Film Festival	Best Villain	Sudeep	Won
8th Toronto After Dark Film Festival	Best Hero (The Fly/Nani)	Nani	Won
2012 Nandi Awards	Best Film (Gold)	Korrapati Ranganatha Sai	Won
2012 Nandi Awards	Best Director	S. S. Rajamouli	Won
2012 Nandi Awards	Best Screenplay Writer	S. S. Rajamouli	Won
2012 Nandi Awards	Best Cinematographer	K. K. Senthil Kumar	Won
2012 Nandi Awards	Best Special Effects	Makuta VFX	Won
2012 Nandi Awards	Best Music Director	M. M. Keeravani	Won
2012 Nandi Awards	Best Villain	Sudeep	Won
2012 Nandi Awards	Best Audiographer	Kadiala Devi Krishna	Won
