= Nandi Awards of 2012 =

Indian Telugu film and TV awards ceremony

Nandi Awards for the year 2012 was announced on 1 March 2017 by the Andhra Pradesh Government.

== Winners list ==
Category	Winner	Film	Nandi Type
Best Feature Film	Sai Korrapati	Eega	Gold
Second Best Feature Film	Krishnam Setty Ayodhya Kumar	Minugurulu	Silver
Third Best Feature Film	Anand Muyida Rao	Mithunam	Bronze
Akkineni Award for Best Home-viewing Feature Film	N. Sudhakar Reddy, Vikram Goud	Ishq	Silver
Best Popular Feature Film	S. Radha Krishna	Julayi	Gold
Best Director	S. S. Rajamouli	Eega	Silver
Best Actor	Nani	Yeto Vellipoyindhi Manasu	Silver
Best Actress	Samantha	Yeto Vellipoyindhi Manasu	Silver
Best Villain	Sudeep	Eega	Copper
Best First Film of a Director	Ayodhyakumar Krishnamsetty	Minugurulu	Copper
Best Supporting Actor	Ajay	Ishq	Copper
Best Supporting Actress	Shyamala Devi	Veerangam	Copper
Best Character Actor	Ashish Vidhyarthi	Minugurulu	Copper
Best Male Comedian	Raghu Babu	Onamalu	Copper
Best Music Director	Ilaiyaraaja, M. M. Keeravani	Yeto Vellipoyindhi Manasu, Eega	Copper
Best Cinematographer	K. K. Senthil Kumar	Eega	Copper
Best Editor	Kotagiri Venkateswara Rao	Eega	Copper
Best Art Director	S. Ramakrishna	Andala Rakshasi	Copper
Best Screenplay Writer	S. S. Rajamouli	Eega	Copper
Best Story Writer	N.V.B.Choudary	Minugurulu	Copper
Best Dialogue Writer	Tanikella Bharani	Mithunam	Copper
Best Lyricist	Anantha Sriram	Yeto Vellipoyindhi Manasu	Copper
Best Children's Film	N/A		Gold
Second Best Children's Film	N/A		Copper
Best Director for a Children’s Film	N/A		Copper
Best Documentary Film	Avayuva Daanam	Avayuva Daanam	Gold
Second Best Documentary Film	Mana Badhyatha	Mana Badhyatha	Silver
First Best Educational Film	N/A		Golden
Second Best Educational Film	N/A		Copper
Best Film Critic on Telugu Cinema	Rentala Jayadev		Copper
Sarojini Devi Award for a Film on National Integration	N/A		Gold
Best Male Playback Singer	Shankar Mahadevan	Shirdi Sai	Copper
Best Female Playback Singer	Geetha Madhuri	Good Morning	Copper
Best Child Actor	Deepak Saroj	Minugurulu	Copper
Best Child Actress	Rushini	Minugurulu	Copper
Best Choreographer	Jani Master	Julayi	Copper
Best Audiographer	Kadiala Devi Krishna	Eega	Copper
Best Costume Designer	Thirumala	Krishnam Vande Jagadgurum	Copper
Best Makeup Artist	Chittoru Srinivas	Krishnam Vande Jagadgurum	Copper
Best Fight Master	Ganesh	Okkadine	Copper
Best Special Effects	Pete Draper (Makuta VFX)	Eega	Copper
Best Male Dubbing Artist	RCM Raju	Minugurulu	Copper
Best Female Dubbing Artist	Shilpa	Veerangam	Copper
Nandi Award for Best Book on Telugu Cinema (Books, posters, etc.)	Cinema Posters	Sri Eeaswar	Copper
Special Jury Award	S. P. Balasubrahmanyam	Mithunam	Copper
Special Jury Award	Lakshmi	Mithunam	Copper
Special Jury Award	Gautham Menon	Yeto Vellipoyindhi Manasu	Copper

== See also ==
- Nandi Awards of 2011
- Nandi Awards of 2013
- Nandi Awards of 2014
- Nandi Awards of 2015
- Nandi Awards of 2016
