= Parugu =

2008 Indian film by Bhaskar

- Film poster
- Directed by: Bhaskar
- Written by: Bhaskar
- Dialogues by: B. V. S. Ravi
- Produced by: Dil Raju
- Starring: Allu Arjun; Sheela Kaur; Prakash Raj
- Cinematography: Vijay K. Chakravarthy
- Edited by: Marthand K. Venkatesh
- Music by: Mani Sharma
- Production company: Sri Venkateswara Creations
- Distributed by: Geetha Arts; Sri Venkateswara Creations; KAD Entertainment USA (USA)
- Release date: 1 May 2008
- Running time: 169 minutes
- Country: India
- Language: Telugu
- Box office: ₹38 crore

Parugu (transl. The Run) is a 2008 Indian Telugu-language romantic action drama film written and directed by Bhaskar and was produced by Dil Raju on Sri Venkateswara Creations. The film stars Allu Arjun, Sheela Kaur and Prakash Raj. The music was composed by Mani Sharma, while cinematography was handled by Vijay K. Chakravarthy.

The plot follows Neelakanta who faces heartbreak when his daughter Subbalakshmi elopes. As he searches for her with the help of Krishna, a love story blossoms between Krishna and Neelakanta's other daughter, Meenakshi. The film explores the complexities of love, family, and sacrifice.

Parugu was officially launched on 15 March 2007 at Hyderabad, and the principal photography began in June 2007. The film was shot in Hyderabad, Kerala, Kodaikanal and Rajamahendravaram while a song was shot in Jordan. The principal photography came to an end in April 2008. The film released worldwide on 1 May 2008 to positive reviews and became commercially successful, earning a distributor share of ₹20 crore. The film won two Nandi Awards and won a Filmfare Award South among three nominations and it is now considered a cult classic.

The film was dubbed into Malayalam as Krishna in the same year, achieving commercial success. It was later remade in Bollywood as Heropanti (2014).

== Plot ==
Neelakanta is a revered person in the village that he resides. His daughters, Subbalakshmi and Meenakshi, are more than anything for him in the world. Subbalakshmi loves a native called Errababu, with whom she elopes on the night of her arranged marriage ceremony. Neelakanta's relative Chinnabbai suspects that Errababu's friends are involved in this, and when interrogated brutally, they reveal that two more people, Sarma from Kakinada, and Krishna from Hyderabad also may have helped the couple elope. By mistaken reference of initials in the names, P. Yagnanarayana Sarma was kidnapped from Kakinada while the original man was left untouched. At Hyderabad, a drunk Krishna is kidnapped at night near his house, who is notoriously known for being a nomad and an expert in escaping. They are imprisoned at the village's temple, and all of them plan to escape the next early morning by catching a train. While all others almost approach the train the next morning, Krishna stops when he sees Meenakshi at an Anjaneya statue and falls in love with her, though she is unaware of his presence. They all are kidnapped yet again by Neelakanta's men and are imprisoned in a small penthouse near Neelakanta's main house. Its doors remain locked, and only three windows are there where a man can see the entrance door of the main house and the nearby flooring and parking area. While his friends are horrified, Krishna is not influenced by the fact that he is in love with a village native and on eloping with her, all of them have to face big trouble from the villagers. Meanwhile, Meenakshi tries to speak with them with an intention to find out details about Subbalakshmi, and neither Krishna nor his friends can see her face because of the penthouse's style of construction.

He asks her to help him find his love and, in return promises her to tell details about Subbalakshmi's whereabouts. The added advantage to Krishna is a set of love letters received by Subbalakshmi from Errababu, which are presently in his custody, and Meenakshi is hell bent recovering them back. Meanwhile, Krishna's friend Srinu is caught red-handed who, after execution of brutal force by Neelakanta's men, reveals that the couple is in Visakhapatnam. There, Krishna manages to send the couple Guntur without the knowledge of Neelakanta's henchmen and later at the penthouse, he reveals he is the mastermind behind the act of Subbalakshmi eloping with Errababu, which is heard by Meenakshi, who hid there and escaped through the back door. Because of her, the truth is revealed, and Krishna too, finds out that his love is none other than Meenakshi. When Krishna and his friends are brutally tortured, he lies that the couple are in Hyderabad to save his friends. Neelakanta, Bullabbai, Chinnabbai, Meenakshi, and others go to Hyderabad with Krishna and his friends, but Krishna is unaware of the fact that Errababu and Subbalakshmi are in Hyderabad. All of them start searching for the couple, and Krishna earns the trust of Neelakanta, his henchmen, and Meenakshi by saving her from a bunch of goons who try to molest her, and she slowly starts reciprocating his love, though never confesses it. Krishna, too realizes the pain faced by Neelakanta because of Subbalakshmi's wrongdoings. The next day, Neelakanta and Krishna manage to catch Subbalakshmi and Errababu red-handed, and there, Subbalakshmi revolts against her father and threatens to file a police case on him. He leaves in dejection, and Krishna watches on. At the railway station, everyone parts ways with Neelakanta apologizing to Krishna and his friends, and invites them to Meenakshi's marriage. Meenakshi stares at Krishna, waiting to confess her love, though Krishna stands like a statue there till the train leaves.

Seeing his son leading a lazy, dull and unexcited life against the way he lived makes Krishna's mother Yashoda send him away to bring Meenakshi as his wife. With Srinu and Sarma pressurizing him, Krishna goes with his friends to attend the marriage. While Neelakanta is afraid Meenakshi would elope with Krishna this night, Krishna confronts Neelakanta, confesses his love for Meenakshi, and assures he would not elope with her. Realizing that Meenakshi's happiness lies in Krishna's company, he lets the lovers unite that night after halting the ongoing ceremony and also plans to bring Subbalakshmi and Errababu back to the village, thus accepting them too.

== Cast ==
- Allu Arjun as Krishna
- Sheela Kaur as Meenakshi “Meena”
- Prakash Raj as Neelakanta
- Chitram Srinu as Shrinu
- Sunil as Ramba Reddy, Krishna's sidekick
- Saptagiri as P. Yagya Narayana Sharma
- Subbaraju as Chinnabbayi
- Sanjay Vellanki as Errababu
- Chitralekha as Tulasi, Meenakshi's servant
- Jaya Prakash Reddy as Sub-Inspector
- Jeeva
- Dhanraj as Krishna's friend
- Srinivasa Reddy as Krishna's friend
- Reena Rizwana
- Rajitha
- Ragini
- Madhavi
- Poonam Bajwa as Subbalakshmi (Cameo appearance)
- Jayasudha as Yashoda, Krishna's mother (Cameo appearance)
- Ali (Cameo appearance)

== Production ==
=== Development ===
After the 2004 film Arya, Dil Raju wanted to produce a film with Allu Arjun as the protagonist of the film and planned to select Sukumar as the director of the film. However it did not materialize. Later Bhaskar approached them with a subject which the duo accepted. Incidentally, it was the sixth film for both Allu Arjun and Dil Raju in their career. The film was officially launched on 15 March 2007 at Dil Raju's office in Hyderabad. Devi Sri Prasad was selected initially as the music director though Mani Sharma replaced him later. The film's title has been in major headlines prior to the film's release. Initially it was reported in early December 2007 that the film is titled Romeo. In early February 2008, it was reported that the film is titled Premikudu which was the title of the Telugu dubbed version of Shankar's Kaadhalan. Later the titles Enta Ghaatu Premayo, Araku and Varadhi were considered before being titled as Parugu. In an interview, Bhaskar said that this film is based on real life characters and the scenes in the film are based on real life happenings.

=== Casting ===
Allu Arjun was a part of the film since its initial stages. He had to shed weight he gained in course of building a six pack body for the film Desamuduru for this film and maintained a short hair style as he had to appear like a common middle-class man. After considering Vedhicka for the female lead, Priyamani was selected in mid-July 2007 marking her first collaboration with Allu Arjun. However, Priyamani walked out of the project and it was reported in mid-August 2007 that she would be replaced with Sheela. Her inclusion was confirmed by Puri Jagannadh who said that her performance in the film Hello Premistara impressed Bhaskar and Dil Raju which made them sign her for this role. Prakash Raj, who played an important role in Bhaskar's debut Bommarillu was signed for an equally important role in this film which the actor quoted as the best role in the film. Subbaraju was selected for an important role with negative shades. Poonam Bajwa made a crucial cameo appearance in this film. Telugu anchor Chitralekha was selected for a small supporting role. Saptagiri debuted as a comedian with this film. Regarding his casting, he said "I assisted Bommarillu Bhaskar for the film Parugu and he was impressed with my narrative skill. He offered me a role, and I received acclaim."

=== Filming ===
During the film's launch, it was planned that the principal photography would commence in May 2007. It was reported in early May 2007 that the principal photography would begin in June 2007, and the technicians are yet to be finalized. In mid-August 2007, the filming continued at Kodaikanal where a song and few important scenes were shot. Later, the film's shoot continued in locales of Kerala where crucial scenes on Allu Arjun, Sheela and Prakash Raj were shot. By 29 September 2007 the film's Kerala schedule was complete by which 30% of the film's shoot was wrapped up. The next schedule started at Hyderabad in the first week of October 2007. The film's climax was shot at Kodaikanal in mid-October 2007. Later, the shooting continued in mid-November 2007 at Rajamahendravaram. It was estimated then that the filming would be wrapped up by January 2008. From 15 March 2008 the filming continued at Jordan where songs on Allu Arjun and Sheela were shot. Later, in an interview on 8 April 2008, Allu Arjun confirmed that 90% of the shooting is complete and the rest would be wrapped in a week.

== Soundtrack ==
Mani Sharma composed the soundtrack and the background score of the film which marks his first collaboration with both Bhaskar and Allu Arjun. The film's soundtrack featured six songs with lyrics written by Sirivennela Sitaramasastri, Anantha Sreeram and Chandrabose. The film's soundtrack was marketed by Aditya Music and launched on 29 March 2008 at Durgam Cheruvu and Chiranjeevi attended the launch as the chief guest. The film's soundtrack was critically and commercially well received, and the platinum disc function was held at Jayabheri Club in Hyderabad on 17 May 2008.

== Reception ==
=== Critical reception ===
The Hindu wrote, "The movie is interesting and a must watch for more than one reason. The usually loud and energy effusing Arjun downplays his role and gives a heartfelt performance. Bhaskar runs a compassionate thread throughout the film even while he spends the first half of the film introducing the characters and seamlessly breaks the flow of characters with humour and minimum violence. There are a few emotionally intense, and fewer tear-jerking moments in the film, but they serve to move the character forward, but to enjoy this film, watch it without any expectation, and you will be surprised with the engaging and a racy tone of the first half and the interesting development of Prakash Raj’s character post interval". Cinegoer.net gave a review stating "A good narrative and a strong subject, with some humor and music added in good measure-Parugu, is another movie from Dil Raju-Bhaskar that is likeable. It may not be up to Bommarillu's standards because the subject itself has been dealt with several times before, and there is a lack of freshness. Nonetheless, the movie is a good watch, and Bhasker proves he's not a one film wonder" and rated the film 3.25/5. Oneindia Entertainment gave a review stating, "Till the interval bang, director Bhaskar has given the audiences an impression that he was able to overcome the second film hitch, which is haunting most of the debutante directors. But he has made mistakes inadvertently in the second half. He has failed to extract the exact emotions from the artists, and the story appears to be dragging and nagging till the climax. However, he has given a good twist in the climax and has made it a little interesting". Idlebrain.com gave a review stating "First half is good and entertaining with nice ambiance. The movie's tempo goes down as soon as the gang shifts to Hyderabad in the second half. The climax of the film appears a little hesitant and ambiguous. The plus points of the film are the energetic performance by Allu Arjun and well made first half. On the flip side, the emotions in the second half don't work, and the movie lacks soul. We have to wait and see how this film fares at box office" and rated the film three out of five.

Rediff.com wrote, "Bhaskar does well in not allowing the heroine and hero to meet face to face, thereby maintaining the suspense. The screenplay in the first half is fast paced, followed by a rather slow second half. The climax is rather tame. Bhaskar ensures that the largely rural setting of the story will go down well with the rural as well as the urban audience. One has to wait and watch if the 'Dil' Raju-Bhaskar duo can repeat the magic of Bommarillu with Parugu". Sify wrote "Producer Dil Raju and director Bhaskar, who created magic among the class and mass audiences with the film Bommarillu has failed to repeat the same in this much-hyped film with Allu Arjun. The movie just doesn’t live up to the huge expectations. It has songs that are sensationally choreographed and have excellent camerawork, but it's still a film with a plot that just doesn't work. It’s an average film at best. Don't go in expecting too much, perhaps you won't be too disappointed". IndiaGlitz wrote "The entire first half gave the audiences an impression that Bommarillu Bhaskar is all set to continue the magic which he did in 'Bommarillu'. However, he trembled in the second half as he doesn't know how to continue the story further. Most of the scenes are very boring, and the audiences were seen moving impatiently in their seats in the absence of enough comedy relief. Too much of emotional scenes in the second half tested the patience of audiences." greatandhra.com gave a review stating "This is the second film by Bommarillu Bhaskar and the next film for Allu Arjun after Desamuduru. It is obvious that the expectations of Arjun fans will be big as their hero's film hitting screens after a very long time. Dil Raju produced it, and hence Bommarillu charisma is added to it. But things didn't gel well with the expectations. The film proved to be a letdown disappointing many" and rated the film 2 1/2 / 5.

== Awards ==
Nandi Awards - 2008

- Third Best Feature Film - Bronze - Dil Raju
- Special Jury Award - Allu Arjun

Filmfare Awards South

- Best Actor – Telugu - Allu Arjun

Nominations

- Best Film – Telugu - Dil Raju
- Best Director – Telugu - Bhaskar
- Best Male Playback Singer – Telugu - Saketh - "Nammavemo Ganee"

== Dubbed version and remakes ==
Parugu was dubbed and released into Malayalam under the title Krishna which became a blockbuster at the box office. The film was remade in Bollywood as Heropanti (2014), in Indian Bengali as Sedin Dekha Hoyechilo (2010)
