= Happy (2006 film) =

2006 Indian Telugu-language film

- Theatrical release poster
- Directed by: A. Karunakaran
- Screenplay by: A. Karunakaran; Kona Venkat (dialogues)
- Story by: Radha Mohan
- Produced by: Allu Aravind
- Starring: Allu Arjun; Genelia D'Souza
- Cinematography: R. D. Rajasekhar
- Edited by: Anthony
- Music by: Yuvan Shankar Raja
- Production company: Geetha Arts
- Distributed by: UTV Motion Pictures
- Release date: 27 January 2006
- Running time: 152 minutes
- Country: India
- Language: Telugu

Happy is a 2006 Indian Telugu-language romantic action comedy film directed by A. Karunakaran and produced by Allu Aravind under his production Geetha Arts banner. The film stars Allu Arjun and Genelia in the lead roles, while Manoj Bajpayee, Deepak Shirke, Brahmanandam, Kishore and Tanikella Bharani appear in supporting roles. The music was scored by Yuvan Shankar Raja, while the cinematography and editing were handled by R. D. Rajasekhar and Anthony. The film is a remake of the 2004 Tamil film Azhagiya Theeye with Radha Mohan providing the story while Karunakaran wrote the screenplay with Kona Venkat penning the dialogues.

Happy was released on 27 January 2006 to generally positive reviews from critics and audiences. Despite the positive reviews, it was a commercial failure during its initial release in Andhra Pradesh, underperforming considerably compared to Arjun's previous films, Arya and Bunny, receiving criticism for its climax along with competition from other more successful releases. It was later dubbed and released in Malayalam as Happy Be Happy, and was a blockbuster in Kerala running successfully for over 175 days. Along with the success of Arya, the film gave rise to Arjun's eventual stardom and popularity in the state, earning him the nickname, "Mallu Arjun". It was remade in Odia as Loafer (2011). The 4K version of the dubbed Malayalam version was re-released in Kerala on June 12, 2026 and took a grand opening, outperforming several big-budget Telugu films and broke records for a Telugu-dubbed film re-release out of state, as well as a re-release in Kerala.

== Plot ==
Madhumathi "Madhu" is the daughter of MLA Suryanarayana, who is a martinet at home with his attachment to power. Surya believes that his daughter's behavior would influence his caste politics, where he tries to keep her from continuing her MBBS as she goes to college and moves with friends of different mentalities. However, Madhu comes to her third year of medicine by maintaining her dignity, focusing completely on studies and not being involved in relationships and love affairs.

Madhu goes for a medical camp with her classmates to Araku Valley, where she meets Bunny Bhasker in the woods. Madhu's initial encounter with Bunny is funny and playful. Bunny comes to Hyderabad and joins in a pizza shop as a delivery boy and continues his MBA by attending evening classes. In an incident, Surya assumes that Madhu is dating Bunny, where he decides to get her married to DCP Arvind. Madhu is more attached to her studies than marriage, where she goes to Bunny and blames him for her marriage. Learning this, Bunny plans to stop the marriage and meets Arvind, where he lies to Arvind and convinces him that he is in love with Madhu. Arvind believes the latter and cancels the wedding, thus angering Surya.

Later, Surya plans to get her married to his friend's son Subba Rao, where he visits DCP Arvind and gives him the marriage invitation. Shocked, Aravind meets Bunny and gets him married to Madhu in a registrar's office, where he also gives his new flat for the couple. Madhu becomes estranged from her family and ends up living with Bunny, who Bunny ends up living with Madhu as he lost his job. Throughout their times together, mishaps and comedic events happen, where Bunny ends up falling for Madhu. Being separated from her family, Madhu has no way of paying for fees. One day, Madhu expresses this to Bunny, who gets into the film industry as an action choreographer and performs dangerous stunts in order to pay her semester fees.

Madhu scores lowest marks in a subject and gets negative feedback from her professor. To focus on her studies, Madhu scorns Bunny and wants him to be out of the house. Madhu focuses on her studies and achieves her MBBS degree with honors. On the day of her graduation, Madhu admits to her friend that she is indeed in love with Bunny, where her friend reveals about Bunny performing dangerous stunts for her college fees. Madhu's friend reveals that Bunny had told her not to reveal this to Madhu and had told her that he is going back to his home in Vishakhapatnam. With regret, Madhu tries to reconcile with Bunny and goes to meet him at the railway station.

On the way there, Madhu gets arrested under prostitution charges by Surya's nemesis ACP Ratnam as she unknowingly gave a lift to a sex worker. Surya storms into the police station and slaps Ratnam for arresting Madhu, but Surya also gets arrested. Madhu manages to contact Bunny with a cell phone provided by one of the inmates, where Bunny arrives to the station. Bunny also had an incident with Ratnam as he once berated him in public for smoking in a gas station. Bunny becomes enraged and has a long and bloody fight with Ratnam and the police until Aravind intervenes and stops the fight. Aravind asks Bunny and Madhu to leave and tells that he will take care of everything. Bunny and Madhu finally reunite with each other.

== Cast ==
- Allu Arjun as Bunny Bhasker
- Genelia D'Souza as Madhumathi "Madhu" (Kantamma)
- Manoj Bajpayee as Deputy Commissioner Aravind Bhasker IPS
- Kishore as ACP Ratna Naidu IPS
- Deepak Shirke as MLA Suryanarayana, Madhu's father
- Tanikella Bharani as Subba Rao, Suryanarayana's friend
- Brahmanandam as Appala Naidu
- Seetha as Madhumati's mother
- Rama Prabha as Madhumati's grandmother
- Suman Setty as Bunny's friend
- M. S. Narayana as a ticket collector
- G. V. Sudhakar Naidu as G. K., a stunt master
- Master Bharath as Bunny's neighbour
- Jahnavi as Madhumati's friend
- Kondavalasa Lakshmana Rao
- Venu Madhav
- L. B. Sriram
- Giri Babu as an advocate
- Rahul Aggarwal
- Vijay Raj
- Apoorva
- Pavala Syamala as a vegetable seller

== Music ==
Happy

Soundtrack album by Yuvan Shankar Raja
- Released: 30 December 2005 (India)
- Recorded: 2005
- Venue: India
- Genre: Feature film soundtrack
- Label: Aditya Music
- Producer: Yuvan Shankar Raja

Yuvan Shankar Raja chronology
Pudhupettai (2005)	Happy (2005)	Pattiyal (2006)

The music was composed by Yuvan Shankar Raja. Songs released on 30 December 2005, was a major highlight and main strength of the film. It features six tracks with 'Sirivennela' Seetharama Sastry, Chandrabose, Kulasekhar, Viswa, Pothula Ravi Kiran, Ananta Sriram having each penned lyrics for one song.

=== Telugu version ===
No.	Song	Singer(s)	Lyrics
1	"Chal Chal Re"	Clinton Cerejo	Viswa
2	"Happy"	Karthik	Chandrabose
3	"Ossa Re"	Jassie Gift, Suchitra, Yuvan Shankar Raja (Rap vocals)	Pothula Ravikiran
4	"I Hate You"	Ranjith, Vasundhara Das	Anantha Sriram
5	"Egire Mabbula" (Version l)	S.P.B. Charan	Kulasekhar
6	"Egire Mabbula" (Version ll)	KK	Kulasekhar
7	"Nee Kosam"	Shankar Mahadevan	Sirivennela Seetharama Sastry

=== Malayalam version ===
The Malayalam version of the soundtrack was released by Johny Sagariga.

Track	Song	Singer(s)	Lyrics
1	"Happy"	Franco	Siju Thuravoor
2	"Chal Chal Chal"	Anwar Sadath	Siju Thuravoor
3	"Malare Maanmizhiyale"	V. Devanand	Joy Thamalam
4	"Chirichu Konjunna"	Jassie Gift, Sangeetha	Siju Thuravoor
5	"Azhake Nee Enne"	Jose Sagar	Siju Thuravoor
6	"I Hate You"	Vidhu Prathap, Akhila Anand	Joffy Tharakan

== Reception ==
=== Critical response ===
Idlebrain.com wrote "Happy is a happy film watch for its songs and comedy." Indiaglitz wrote "The combination of enjoyable fun, good music and easy emotions make Happy work."
