= Vijetha (1985 film) =

- Theatrical release poster
- Directed by: A. Kodandarami Reddy
- Written by: Jandhyala (Dialogue)
- Story by: Ranjan Roy
- Based on: Saaheb (1985) by Anil Ganguly
- Produced by: Allu Aravind
- Starring: Chiranjeevi; Bhanupriya; Sharada; Shubha
- Cinematography: Lok Singh
- Edited by: M. Vellaiswamy
- Music by: K. Chakravarthy
- Production company: Geetha Arts
- Distributed by: Geetha Arts
- Release date: 23 October 1985 (India)
- Running time: 110 min
- Country: India
- Language: Telugu

Vijetha (transl. Winner) is a 1985 Indian Telugu-language film directed by A. Kodandarami Reddy and produced by Allu Aravind starring Chiranjeevi, Bhanupriya, and J. V. Somayajulu. The film released on 23 October 1985. The film was a remake of the 1981 Bengali film Saheb starring Tapas Paul and Utpal Dutt which was earlier remade in Hindi as Saaheb (1985) with Anil Kapoor. The film was dubbed in Tamil as Dharma Prabhu.

Chiranjeevi won his second Filmfare Best Actor Award for his performance in the film.

This Marks the Debut of Actor Allu Arjun in Telugu Cinema

== Plot ==
Madhusudhana Rao, aka Chinnababu (Chiranjeevi) is a wannabe football player, who would like to represent his country. Chinnababu is also the youngest son of Narasimham (J. V. Somayajulu). Chinnababu is in love with his childhood friend and neighbour Priyadarshani (Bhanupriya). Despite his father's efforts to stop him, Chinnababu's love towards football grows and his coach encourages him to participate in leagues. Priyadarshani supports him in all his endeavours. Chinnababu's younger sister's marriage gets fixed and they are unable to arrange enough money for the marriage. Narasimham asks his sons to contribute. However, his sons, who are controlled by their wives, deny any help. Frustrated, Narasimham tries to sell his house but, Chinnababu stops him in the last moment and sends him money, saying that his elder sister sent it. His sister's marriage is done uninterrupted, without Chinnababu's presence. After marriage, his elder sister arrives and denies that she sent any money. Surprised and shocked, Chinnababu's family later learns that Chinnababu donated one of his kidneys to save a rich man's heir and sent that money. Narasimham appreciates his son's efforts, for not even bothering about his football career and saving his house on time.

== Cast ==
- Chiranjeevi as Madhusudhana Rao
- Bhanupriya as Priyadarshani
- Sharada
- J. V. Somayajulu as Narasimham
- Allu Ramalingaiah
- Jandhyala as Coach
- Nutan Prasad
- Vankayala Satyanarayana
- Ranganath
- Giri Babu
- Jaggayya
- Kantha Rao
- Koppineedi Deepthi
- Sri Lakshmi
- Y. Vijaya
- Shubha
- Kaikala Satyanarayana
- P. J. Sarma
- Chidathala Appa Rao
- Master Allu Arjun as Saratha's son (child artist)

== Production ==
Most of the outdoor scenes were shot in Mumbai, where Saheeb was shot. Mukesh Udeshi helped the team a lot in the Mumbai shooting. Rohini dubbed Bhanupriya's voice in the film. Sreelakshmi, who played the wife of Giribabu, also had her voice dubbed by someone else for the film. K. Dattu, who worked for camera in this film as an assistant, worked for films like Shankar Dada MBBS later. Both Allu brothers, Bunny and Bobby, acted in the film. Allu Venkatesh appeared as Nutan Prasad's son and has a couple of dialogues. Allu Arjun, a three-year-old boy at that time, appears in two scenes as Subha's son.

Many discussions went into zeroing in on a title for the movie. Chinnababu was considered earlier, as both Bengali and Hindi versions had the male lead character's name as the title. There was also an advertisement in the popular film magazine Jyothichitra asking for title suggestions, and Vijetha won the majority votes. A lucky draw of those voter names was held and the winners' names were credited in the film, too.

== Awards ==
Year	Nominee / work	Award	Result
1985	Chiranjeevi	Filmfare Award for Best Actor – Telugu	Won

== Soundtrack ==
Vijetha

Soundtrack album by K. Chakravarthy
- Released: 1985
- Genre: Soundtrack
- Length: 22:01
- Label: Geetha Arts
- Producer: K. Chakravarthy

K. Chakravarthy chronology
Palnati Simham (1985)	Vijetha (1985)	Vajrayudham (1986)

The music for the film was composed by K. Chakravarthy . Lyrics were written by Veturi.

Track listing
No.	Title	Lyrics	Singer(s)	Length
1.	"Jeevitame Oka Payanam"	Veturi	S. P. Balasubrahmanyam	5:32
2.	"Entha Edigi Poyavayya"	Veturi	S. P. Balasubrahmanyam	3:47
3.	"Naa Meedha"	Veturi	S. Janaki	4:26
4.	"6 o' Clock"	Veturi	S. P. Balasubrahmanyam, S. Janaki	4:19
5.	"Chikku Chikku"	Veturi	S. P. Balasubrahmanyam, P. Susheela	4:17
Total length:				22:01
