= Bunny (2005 film) =

2005 film by V. V. Vinayak

- Theatrical release poster
- Directed by: V. V. Vinayak
- Screenplay by: V. V. Vinayak
- Story by: V. V. Vinayak
- Produced by: Mallidi Satyanarayana Reddy; Allu Aravind (Presenter)
- Starring: Allu Arjun; Gowri Munjal; Prakash Raj; Mukesh Rishi
- Cinematography: Chota K. Naidu
- Edited by: Gautham Raju
- Music by: Devi Sri Prasad
- Production company: Siri Venkateswara Productions
- Release date: 6 April 2005
- Running time: 139 minutes
- Country: India
- Language: Telugu
- Box office: ₹16 crore distributors' share

Bunny is a 2005 Indian Telugu-language romantic action comedy film written and directed by V. V. Vinayak, with cinematography by Chota K. Naidu. The film was presented by Allu Aravind and produced by Mallidi Satyanarayana Reddy. This film stars Allu Arjun and Gowri Munjal, while Prakash Raj and Mukesh Rishi play supporting roles with Sarath Kumar in a guest appearance. The music was composed by Devi Sri Prasad with editing done by Gautham Raju and cinematography by Chota K. Naidu.

The film was released on 6 April 2005, received mixed-to-positive reviews, and was commercially successful.

Later the film was dubbed and released in Malayalam as Bunny: The Lion was also commercial success. The film was remade in Bangladeshi Bengali as Tomar Jonno Morte Pari (2007) starring Shakib Khan.

== Plot ==
Somaraju is a leading businessman and crime boss in Visakhapatnam. Mysamma is a close member of Somaraju and his right hand handles his criminal deals in Hyderabad. Mahalakshmi is Somaraju's daughter, and he dearly loves her. Bunny alias Raja joins the same college as Mahalakshmi. He impresses her on the first day itself. Slowly, she falls in love with him. Somaraju, though reluctant initially, agrees to the marriage. Now, Raja has a condition that Somaraju should give his entire property to Raja as a dowry. The rest of the story explains why Raja asks for Somaraju's property.

Raja's birth father, a king, Ranga Rao Bhupathi Raja, is Mahalakshmi's maternal uncle. Bhupathi Raja was a great man with much land and property, as well as much regard from the government and other people. There is a water shortage for farming in the area where he lives. As a result, Bhupathi Raja starts a rally to initiate the Polavaram Project. The rally becomes so widespread, that the Chief Minister of Andhra Pradesh, decides to meet with Bhupathi Raja. Bhupathi Raja decides to give away all of his land, 4,000 acres, to the people who lose land when the project gets initiated. When Mahalakshmi is born, her mother asks Bhupathi Raja to perform the baby naming ceremony and such. On Bhupathi Raja's way there, however, Somaraju attacks him with the help of a bunch of rowdies. Somaraju fraudulently transfers Bhupathi Raju's property to himself. They pretty much kill Bhupathi Raja and leave him to die in the forest. However, Bhupathi Raja manages to live and perform Mahalakshmi's ceremony, but he dies minutes after without telling anyone what happened.

Raja learns of this when his so-called father, Rangaswamy, explains to him that he is his godfather and not his father. While trying to save him, his godfather and godmother give up their son to keep him alive. To regain his rightful property, Raja fights Mysamma and wins his girl.

== Cast ==
- Allu Arjun as Raja alias Bunny
- Gowri Munjal as Mahalakshmi
  - Baby Kavya as Young Mahalakshmi
- Prakash Raj as Somaraju
- Mukesh Rishi as Maisamma
- Sharat Saxena as Rangaswamy, Raja's foster father
- Sudha as Raja's foster mother
- Seetha as Bunny's aunt
- Raghu Babu as Suri, Somaraju's henchman
- Ahuti Prasad as DCP Venkhayya
- Rajan P. Dev as Chief Minister Gudumba Chatti
- M. S. Narayana as Daiva Sahayam and Daiva Sahayam's father
- Chalapathi Rao as Advocate Suryanarayana
- Venu Madhav as Daiva Sahayam's assistant
- Fish Venkat as Somaraju's henchman
- L. B. Sriram as Doctor
- Jenny as Lecturer
- Chitram Srinu as Bunny's friend
- Dil Ramesh as Somaraju's henchman
- Sravan as Tarun
- Sarath Kumar as Ranga Rao Bhupathi Raja ,Raja's father(guest appearance)

== Production ==
Bunny is Allu Arjun's third film as the lead actor after Gangotri (2003) and Arya (2004).

== Music ==
Bunny

Soundtrack album to Bunny by Devi Sri Prasad
- Released: 25 February 2005
- Recorded: 2005uy
- Genre: Feature film soundtrack
- Length: 27:07
- Language: Telugu
- Label: Aditya Music
- Producer: Devi Sri Prasad

Devi Sri Prasad chronology
Maayavi (2005)	Bunny (2005)	Sachein (2005)

All music was scored by Devi Sri Prasad and released by Aditya Music.

Track listing
No.	Title	Lyrics	Singer(s)	Length
1.	"Maro Maro"	Chandrabose	Tippu	5:08
2.	"Jabilammavo"	Chandrabose	Sagar, Malathy Lakshman	4:34
3.	"Va Va Vareva"	Viswa	Karthik, Sumangali	4:08
4.	"Mayilu Mayilu"	Suddala Ashok Teja	Devi Sri Prasad	4:57
5.	"Kana Padaleda"	Suddala Ashok Teja	S. P. Balasubrahmanyam	3:33
6.	"Bunny Bunny"	Chandrabose	Srilekha Parthasarathy, Murali	4:47
Total length:				27:07

== Reception ==
B Anuradha of Rediff.com criticized the plot for being an "age-old revenge drama" while praising Allu Arjun's performance. "Allu Arjun's effortless dancing and fights could be in vain, thanks to the boring theme," she added. A reviewer from Sify who rated 3/5 also echoed the same. "The story and presentation is old wine in a new bottle, but the performance of Allu Arjun, Prakash Raj and Raghu Babu saves the film to a very large extent," the reviewer stated.

== Accolades ==
Sagar was nominated for Filmfare Award for Best Male Playback Singer – Telugu at 53rd Filmfare Awards South.
