= K. K. Senthil Kumar =

Indian cinematographer

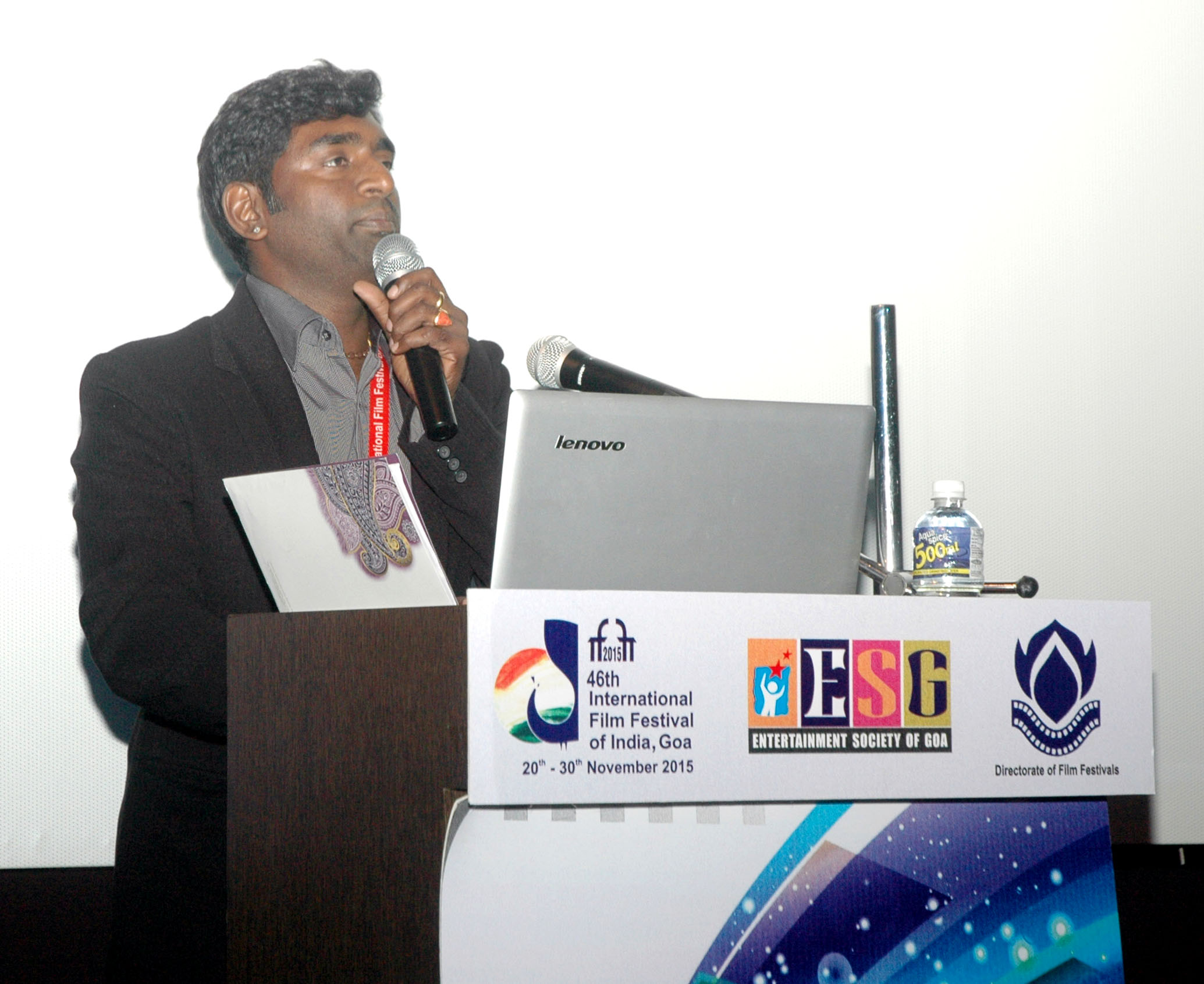
- Master Class on Cinematography by K.K. Senthil Kumar (Cinematographer), at the 46th International Film Festival of India (IFFI-2015), in Panaji, Goa on November 26, 2015.
- Born: 29 July 1974 (age 52); Secunderabad, Andhra Pradesh, India (now in Telangana, India)
- Education: Film and Television Institute of India, Pune
- Occupations: Cinematographer; photographer
- Spouse: Ruhee Naaz (m. 2009; died 2024)
- Children: 2

K. K. Senthil Kumar (Kodandapani Krishna Murthy Senthil Kumar) is an Indian cinematographer who works in Telugu cinema. He is known for his frequent collaborations with S.S. Rajamouli. A graduate of the Film and Television Institute of India, Pune, Senthil Kumar began his career as a cinematographer with the TV sitcom Amrutham and made his film debut with Aithe (2003), earning critical recognition.

Over the years, he has worked on several notable films, including Sye (2004), Chatrapathi (2005), Yamadonga (2007), Arundhati (2009), Magadheera (2009), Eega (2012), Baahubali (2015), Baahubali 2 (2017), and RRR (2022). He earned various accolades, including four Filmfare Awards, two Nandi Awards and four SIIMA awards, among others.

== Early and personal life ==
K. K. Senthil Kumar ( Kodandapani Krishna Murthy Senthil Kumar ) was born and brought up in Hyderabad, into a Tamil-speaking family. He is the eldest of three siblings. He graduated with a degree in cinematography from the Film and Television Institute of India (FTII), Pune.

Kumar married Ruhee Naaz on 25 June 2009, who was a Yoga instructor and headed the Hyderabad division of Bharat Thakur's Yoga classes. The couple had two sons: Ryaan Kartikeyan and Dhruva Kartikeyan. Ruhee died on 15 February 2024 at a private hospital in Hyderabad.

== Career ==
After his graduation from FTII, he joined cinematographer Sarath as an assistant cinematographer. He worked under Sarath from Premaku Velayara (1999) to Jabili (2001). He started his work as an Independent Cinematographer with the TV Series Amrutham in 2000. When Chandra Sekhar Yeleti was making his directorial debut with Aithe (2003), he took Senthil on as the cinematographer, marking his official feature-film debut.

== Filmography ==
- All films are in Telugu, unless otherwise mentioned

Year	Title	Notes
2003	Aithe	
2004	Sye	
2005	Chatrapathi	
2006	Ashok	
2007	Yamadonga	
2008	Three	
2009	Arundhati	
2009	Magadheera	
2010	Thakita Thakita	
2011	Golconda High School	
2012	Eega	
2013	Rough	
2015	Baahubali: The Beginning	Also shot in Tamil
2017	Baahubali 2: The Conclusion	Partially reshot in Tamil
2018	Vijetha	
2022	RRR	
2025	Junior	Also shot in Kannada
2025	Baahubali: The Epic	
TBA	Swayambhu	

== Awards ==
Filmfare Awards South

- Best Cinematographer- Magadheera (2010) at 57th Filmfare Awards South
- Best Cinematographer- Baahubali: The Beginning (2016) at 63rd Filmfare Awards South
- Best Cinematographer- Baahubali 2: The Conclusion (2018) at 65th Filmfare Awards South
- Best Cinematographer- RRR (2024) at 68th Filmfare Awards South

Nandi Awards

- Best Cinematographer - Eega at Nandi Awards of 2012
- Best Cinematographer - Baahubali: The Beginning at Nandi Awards of 2015

South Indian International Movie Awards

- Best Cinematographer – Telugu – Eega (2013) at 2nd SIIMA
- Best Cinematographer – Telugu – Baahubali: The Beginning (2016) at 5th SIIMA
- Best Cinematographer – Telugu – Baahubali 2: The Conclusion (2018) at 7th SIIMA
- Best Cinematographer – Telugu – RRR at 11th SIIMA

CineMAA Awards

- Best Cinematographer – Magadheera (2010)
- Best Cinematographer – Yamadonga (2008)

Santosham Film Awards

- Best Cinematographer - Baahubali 2: The Conclusion (2017) at 16th Santosham Film Awards

Philadelphia Film Critics Circle

- Best Cinematography – RRR (2022)
