= Mithunam (2012 film) =

- Directed by: Tanikella Bharani
- Screenplay by: Tanikella Bharani
- Story by: Sri Ramana
- Produced by: Anand Muyida Rao
- Starring: S. P. Balasubrahmanyam; Lakshmi
- Cinematography: Rajendra Prasad Tanikella
- Edited by: S. B. Uddhav
- Music by: Swaraveenapani
- Distributed by: AMR Productions; J & J films
- Release date: 21 December 2012
- Country: India
- Language: Telugu

Mithunam (transl. Couple) is a 2012 Indian Telugu-language drama film directed by Tanikella Bharani, who co-wrote the screenplay with Sri Ramana. The film features only two on-screen characters—S. P. Balasubrahmanyam and Lakshmi. The film is based on a best selling Telugu novel of the same name, written by Sri Ramana. The film won four state Nandi Awards.

Mithunam is also a zodiac sign. AMR Productions released Mithunam on 21 December 2012 to positive reviews. The film ran for fifty days.

== Plot ==
Appadasu is a retired teacher who lives in his native village with his wife Buchchi Lakshmi. Both are senior citizens, and all of their children are living abroad, though instead of feeling lonely and insecure about their life, both Appadasu and Buchchi have their own share of romance happening. They treat each and every day as a special day and enjoy the moments. This relationship also has its share of ups and downs, and what life has in store for them forms the rest of the story.

== Cast ==
- S. P. Balasubrahmanyam as Appadaasu
- Lakshmi as Buchchi Lakshmi

=== Voice cast ===
- Mohan Krishna Indraganti as Keshava
- Prakash Raj as Madhava
- Brahmanandam as the son-in-law of Appadasu
- Jhansi as Meenakshi
- Saikumar as the radio
- Mirchi Ramakrishna as the rooster
- Sushma Nittala as the chicken

== Soundtrack ==
Track listing
No.	Title	Lyrics	Singer(s)	Length
1.	"Aadi Dampatulu"	Jonnavithula	K. J. Yesudas	03:27
2.	"Evaru Gelicharippudu"	Anand Muyida Rao	K. Jamuna Rani	03:04
3.	"Aavakaya Mana Andaridi"	Tanikella Bharani	S. P. Balasubrahmanyam, Swapna	3:19
4.	"Coffee Dandakam"	Jonnavithhula	Jonnavithhula	3:00
5.	"Aata Kada Jananalu"	Tanikella Bharani	K. J. Yesudas	02:25

== Reception ==
=== Critical response ===
A critic from The Times of India wrote that "Imagine a movie with only two characters! The only other voice that comes is heard only in the 43rd minute of the movie. But through the film, you know it is Tanikella Bharani who is speaking through every frame". Jeevi of Idlebrain.com said that "This film is of 'world cinema' quality on international circuit. On a whole, Mithunam is a film that every Indian should watch". A critic from Telugucinema.com wrote that "Director Bharani justifies Sriramana's story and Balu and Lakshmi justify the characters therein. Appreciable cinematography, music, lyrics, editing, and dialogues make the film authentic and enjoyable".

== Awards ==
CineMAA Awards
- CineMAA Award Special Jury Award for Best Direction (2013) – Tanikella Bharani

Nandi Awards
- Nandi Award for Third Best Feature Film (2013) – Bronze
- Special Jury Award: – S. P. Balasubrahmanyam
- Special Jury Award: – Lakshmi
- Best Dialogue Writer- Tanikella Bharani
