= Desamuduru =

- Theatrical release poster
- Directed by: Puri Jagannadh
- Written by: Puri Jagannadh
- Produced by: D. V. V. Danayya
- Starring: Allu Arjun; Hansika Motwani
- Cinematography: Shyam K. Naidu
- Edited by: Marthand K. Venkatesh
- Music by: Chakri
- Production company: Universal Media
- Distributed by: Universal Media
- Release date: 12 January 2007
- Running time: 148 minutes
- Country: India
- Language: Telugu
- Box office: ₹26 crore distributors' share

Desamuduru (transl. Cunning Lad) is a 2007 Indian Telugu-language romantic action comedy film directed by Puri Jagannadh and produced by DVV Danayya under Universal Media. The film stars Allu Arjun and Hansika Motwani (in her Telugu debut), alongside Pradeep Rawat, Ali, Devan, Telangana Shakuntala and Subbaraju.

Desamuduru was released on 12 January 2007 and was a blockbuster, collecting a distributor's share of ₹26 crore at the box office, emerging as the second highest-grossing Telugu film of 2007.

== Plot ==
Bala Govind is a program director in Maa TV, whose fights for justice regularly get him into trouble. During one of these incidents, Bala saves a person from goons, and severely beats Murugesan, the son of notorious smuggler Tambi Durai to a coma, during an attempt to expose illegal bootlegging in the area of Dhoolpet. Fearing retribution from Tambi Durai, the Maa TV crew sends Bala's team to Kullu Manali to shoot a travel episode. After reaching Manali, Bala sees Vaishali, a sannyasin, and soon falls in love with her. Though initially apprehensive of Bala, Vaishali reciprocates his feelings. The ashram's head sannyasin Rama Prabha also accepts their relationship. Before Bala is able to return to Hyderabad with Vaishali, Tambi Durai's henchmen kidnap her and take her to his home. Confused, Bala goes to one of Tambi Durai's hideout, and ends up rescuing the person whom he saved first. The person later reveals that Vaishali is the daughter of Narayan Patwari, a gangster at Dhoolpet. The person was the chief enforcer of Patwari and Vaishali's guardian, while Tambi Durai, Murugesan and his uncle Ponnuswamy were his henchmen; Tambi Durai, who had an eye on Patwari's properties, killed Patwari and his wife in front of Vaishali and his wife Andal fixed Vaishali's marriage with Murugesan to usurp her properties in front of her dying parents, but Vaishali escaped with the help of her guardian and ended up reaching Kullu Manali, and later ended up getting kidnapped by Tambi Durai's henchmen who saw her in TV at the program taken by Bala and his team. Bala seeks the help of Inspector Prasad to arrest Tambi Durai and his gang, and takes Dhoolpet under his control; he stages a distraction at Tambi Durai's lair to rescue Vaishali, and lures them into a warehouse, where he locks them in to be arrested by the police, who saw the gang's activities through live recordings taken by Bala's team. Later, he marries Vaishali and returns back to Kullu Manali.

== Cast ==
- Allu Arjun as Bala Govind
- Hansika Motwani as Vaishali (Voice dubbed by Sowmya Sharma)
- Ali as Shankar / Himalayan Baba
- Chandra Mohan as Chandram, Bala's father
- Devan as Narayan Patwari, Vaishali's father
- Sudha as Janaki, Vaishali's mother
- Pradeep Rawat as Tambi Durai
- Telangana Shakuntala as Andal, Tambi Durai's wife
- Subbaraju as Murugesan, Tambi Durai's son
- Ahuti Prasad as Inspector A. Prasad
- Rama Prabha as Rama Prabha
- Ajay as Sheru, Tambi Durai's mute henchman
- G. V. Sudhakar Naidu as Tambi Durai's henchman
- Kovai Sarala as Shivani
- Raghu Babu as Compounder
- Gundu Sudharshan as Sudarshan
- Srinivasa Reddy as Ravi
- Raja Ravindra as Vaishali's guardian
- Satyam Rajesh as Rajesh, Bala's colleague
- Jeeva as Ponnuswamy, Tambi Durai’s younger brother
- Hema as Ponnuswamy's wife
- Uttej as Radio Mirchi Reporter
- Narsing Yadav as Police Inspector
- Venu Madhav as Tea Seller
- Gautam Raju as Apples Exporter
- Shankar Melkote as Doctor
- Saptagiri as Bala's colleague
- Sandra as Bala's colleague
- Sony Raj as Bala's colleague
- Phani as Bala's colleague
- Junior Relangi as Bala's colleague
- Vamsi Krishna
- Rambha in the item number "Attaantode Ittaantode"

== Production ==
After the release of Happy (2006), Allu Arjun was reported to be keen to act in the Telugu remake of Sivakasi (2005) starring Vijay and Asin. He later accepted to act in a film directed by Puri Jagannadh and produced by DVV Danayya under the banner Universal Media. The title was confirmed as Desamuduru. Puri Jagannadh worked on the film's script at Bangkok and returned to Hyderabad on 16 June 2006. The film had its official launch at the office of Puri Jagannadh's production company Vaishno Academy on 19 June 2006.

=== Casting ===
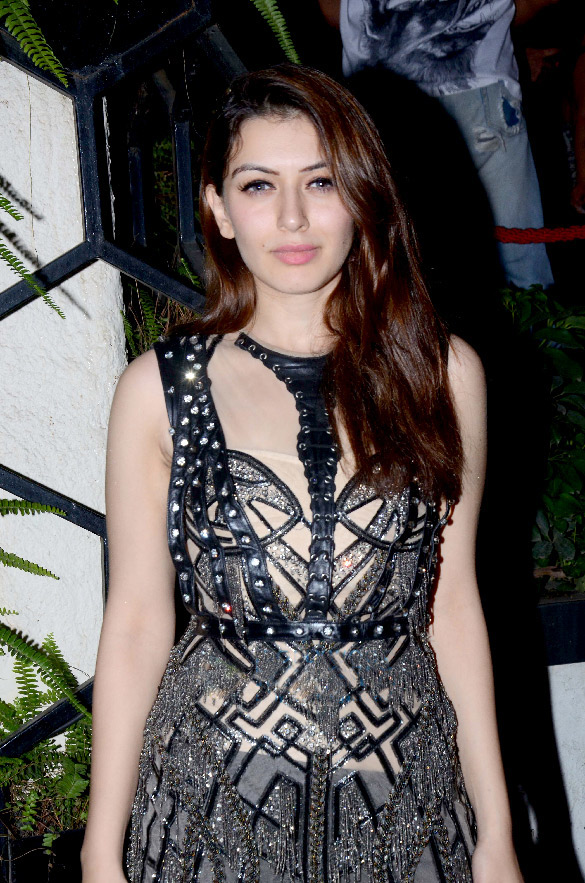
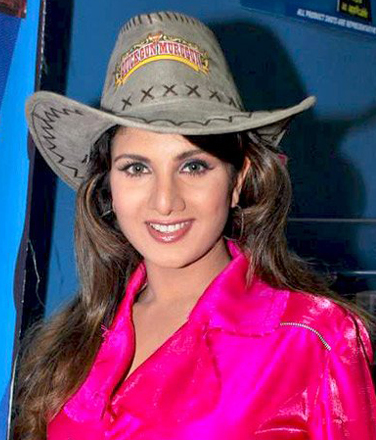
Hansika Motwani (left) was cast as the lead actress while Rambha (right) was cast as the item number alongside Allu Arjun.

Allu Arjun played the role of a crime reporter working for MAA TV in the film. For his role, Allu Arjun sported a long hairdo and built six pack abs. Hansika Motwani was selected as the female lead which marked her debut in Telugu cinema as an actress at a very young age of 15. She played the role of a sanyasin in the film. Rambha was selected for an item number in the film, despite initial reports stated that Charmee Kaur would dance in the song.

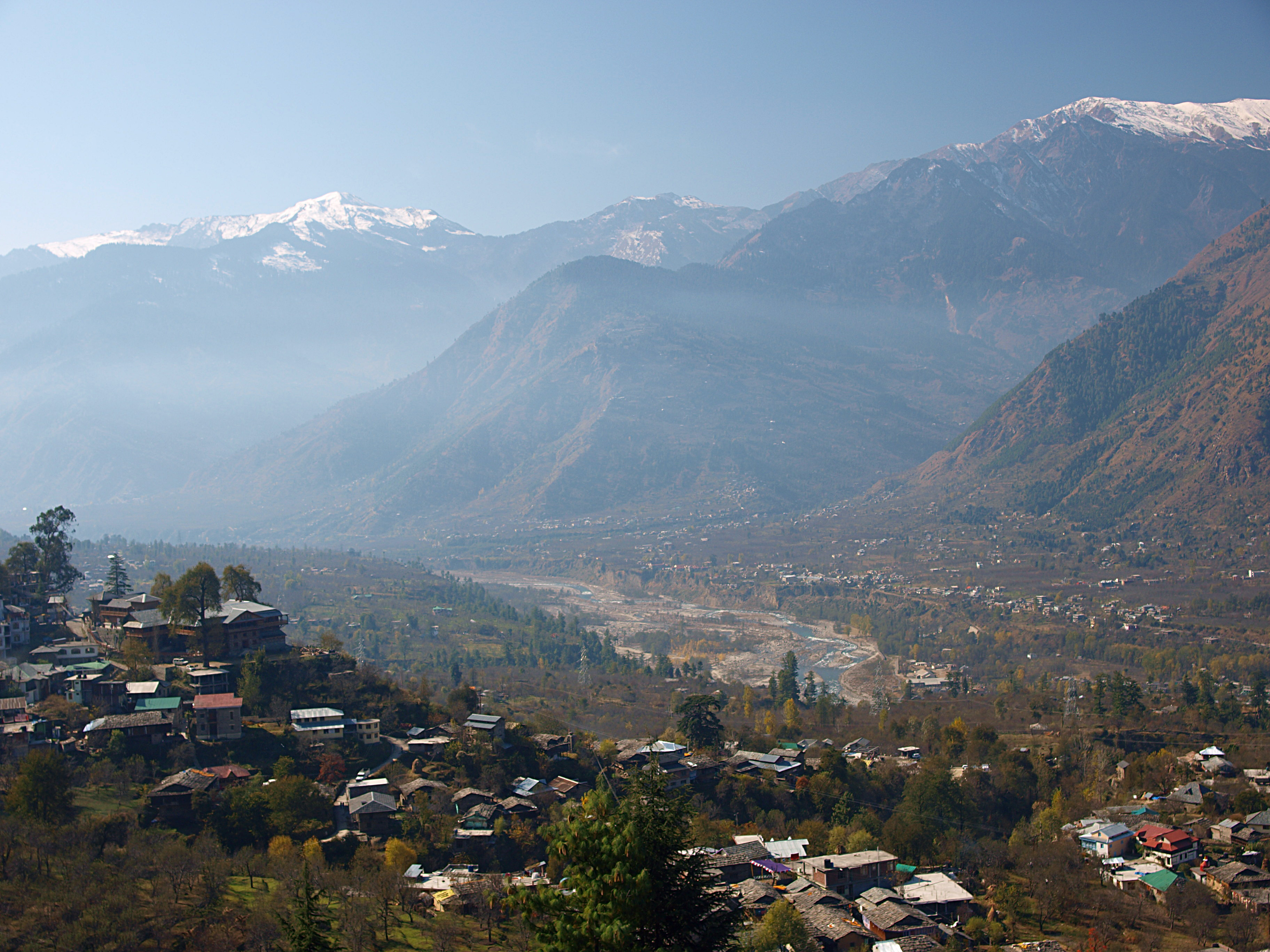
The Himalayas as seen from Kullu Valley, Himachal Pradesh

=== Filming ===
Filming began on 14 July 2006 at Hyderabad where the film's first schedule was shot. The next schedule began in Himachal Pradesh. Few action sequences were shot at Manali in early September 2006. Weeks later, few scenes between the lead pair were shot in Uttaranchal and Himachal Pradesh. This schedule was planned to be wrapped up on 5 December 2006. However the schedule was completed on 10 October 2006. Some crucial action sequences were shot at Aluminium Factory in Gachibowli in early December 2006.

== Soundtrack ==
Desamuduru

Soundtrack album by Chakri
- Released: 25 December 2006
- Venues: Rock Gardens, Madhapur, Hyderabad
- Genre: Feature film soundtrack
- Length: 28:03
- Label: Aditya Music
- Producer: Chakri

Chakri chronology
Chukkallo Chandrudu (2006)	Desamuduru (2006)	Dhee (2007)

The film has six songs composed by Chakri. Music of the film was launched on 25 December 2006. The song "Ninne Ninne" was the most popular song in the soundtrack among music lovers.

No.	Title	Lyrics	Singer(s)	Length
1.	"Ninne Ninne"	Kandikonda	Chakri, Kousalya	4:40
2.	"Gili Giligaa"	Bhaskarabhatla	Devan, Andrea Jeremiah	4:32
3.	"Satte E Godavaa Ledu"	Bhaskarabhatla	Ranjith, Rita	4:18
4.	"Gola Pettinaadiro"	Bhaskarabhatla	Raghu Kunche, Kousalya	4:39
5.	"Manasuley"	Kandikonda	Chakri, Kousalya	4:51
6.	"Attaantode Ittaantode"	Bhaskarabhatla	Ravi Varma, Suchitra	5:03
Total length:				28:03

== Release ==
The film was released on 500 screens, including 424 in Andhra Pradesh, 32 in Karnataka, 8 in Orissa, 2 in Chennai, 3 in Mumbai and 31 overseas.

== Box office ==
Desamuduru ran for more than 175 days. The film grossed ₹12.58 crore and a share of ₹9.5 crore. worldwide in the first week of its release. The film collected a share of ₹20 crore in four weeks. It ran for more than 365 days.

The film was the highest-grossing film in Allu Arjun's career at the time of its release and the second highest-grossing Telugu movie of 2007.

== Accolades ==
55th Filmfare Awards

- Best Film – DVV Danayya – Nominated
- Best Director – Puri Jagannadh – Nominated
- Best Actor – Allu Arjun – Nominated
- Best Music Director – Chakri – Nominated
- Filmfare Award for Best Female Debut – South – Hansika Motwani – Won

Nandi Awards

- Best Choreographer – Nobel – "Satte E Godava Ledu" – Won

Santosham Film Awards

- Best Young Performers – Allu Arjun – Won
- Best Debut Heroine – Hansika Motwani – Won

CineMAA Awards

- Best Actor (Jury) – Allu Arjun – Won
- Best Female Debut – Hansika Motwani – Won
