= Minugurulu =

- Film poster
- Directed by: Ayodhyakumar Krishnamsetty
- Written by: Ayodhyakumar Krishnamsetty; N. V. B. Choudary
- Story by: N. V. B.Choudary
- Produced by: Ayodhyakumar Krishnamsetty
- Starring: Ashish Vidyarthi; Suhasini Maniratnam; Raghubir Yadav; Deepak Saroj
- Cinematography: David Edward Fuller; Paulius Kontijevas
- Edited by: Kiran Ganti
- Music by: Dr: Josyabhatla
- Distributed by: Respect Creations
- Release dates: 2012 (A.P. Film Chamber); 25 January 2014 (India)
- Running time: 109 minutes
- Country: India
- Language: Telugu

Minugurulu (transl. Fireflies) is a 2012 Indian Telugu-language social problem film co-written and directed by Ayodhyakumar Krishnamsetty. The film stars Ashish Vidyarthi, Suhasini Maniratnam, Raghubir Yadav and Deepak Saroj.

The film was selected as Best Indian Film at the 9th India International Children's Film Festival, held at Bangalore. The film has also garnered the Akkineni Vamsee International Award. The film has received seven state Nandi Awards including Best Film (Silver), and Best First Film of a director for the year 2012.

== Plot ==
Raju, a mother-less child, is orphaned by his father, as he is blinded while editing a video that he has made in a local photo studio. He is admitted to a residential blind orphanage run by a depraved man, who battens on the money meant for the welfare of the blind and keeps the children in deplorable conditions. As visually impaired boy, he learns to see life as a challenge. In the process of coping with the fresh blindness, Raju finds four friends Mynah, Sukumar, Bhaskar and Anand among the children of the centre. All the children decide to send a complaint to the District Collector with the help of Raju. Unfortunately the whole effort goes in vain. This humiliation and pain strengthens the resolve of the children to expose the man's delinquency. The mission "Divya-Drushti" starts with Raju's astounding idea of portraying the brutality of Narayana with all the evidence to the District Collector and makes an identity and creates independence not only to him but also to others.

== Cast ==
- Ashish Vidyarthi as Narayana
- Suhasini as Kiranmai
- Raghubir Yadav as Surdas
- Deepak Saroj as Raju
- Sreenivasa Sayee as Shiva

== Reception ==
The film was also showcased official selection, Golden Elephant, at the International Children's Film Festival in Hyderabad, India. The film was also showcased at the Rafi Peer's 3rd International Film Festival held at Lahore in December 2013. On 26 December 2013, the film was screened at the Kolkata International Film Festival and International Children's Film Festival of Kolkata. The film garnered official selection at the Fifth International Disability Film Festival – Ability Fest held between 23 and 26 September 2013.

The film is the "First Telugu script to be preserved in Oscar Library‘s permanent core collection" and First ever Telugu film that is contended for OSCAR best feature 2014 Along with 323 Features.

== Awards ==
2012 Nandi Awards

- Nandi Award for Best Feature Film (silver) – Ayodhya Kumar
- Nandi Award for Best First Film of a Director – Ayodhya Kumar
- Nandi Award for Best Story Writer – NVB Choudary, Ayodhya Kumar
- Nandi Award for Best Character Actor – Ashish Vidyarthi
- Nandi Award for Best Child Actor – Deepak Saroj
- Nandi Award for Best Child Actress – Rushini
- Nandi Award for Best Male Dubbing Artist – R. C. M. Raju

Mirchi Music Awards

- Upcoming Lyricist of the Year (2014) – Chakravarthula
