= Nandi Special Jury Award =

Award given for Telugu-language films

The Nandi Special Jury Award is given by the Andhra Pradesh state government as part of its annual Nandi Awards for Telugu films since 1981.

Year	Special Award Winner		Title
2016	Nani	Actor	Gentleman
2016	Chandra Sekhar Yeleti	Story, Screenplay, Direction	Manamantha
2016	Saagar K Chandra	Story, Screenplay, Direction	Appatlo Okadundevadu
2015	Nithya Menen	Actress	Malli Malli Idi Rani Roju
2015	Parvateesam	Actor	Kerintha
2015	Vijay Deverakonda	Actor	Yevade Subramanyam
2015	Sharwanand	Actor	Malli Malli Idi Rani Roju
2015	Gnana Shekar V.S.	Cinematographer	Malli Malli Idi Rani Roju; Kanche
2014	Srinivas Avasarala	Director	Oohalu Gusagusalade
2014	Meka Ramakrishna	Actor	Malli Raadoy Life
2014	Krishna Rao	Actor	Adavi Kaachina Vennela
2013	Siddique	Actor	Naa Bangaaru Talli
2013	Anjali	Actress	Seethamma Vakitlo Sirimalle Chettu
2013	Ramya Sri	Actress	O Malli
2013	Kalki Mitra	Actress	Yugamali
2013	Chaitanya Krishna	Actor	Kaalicharan
2012	S. P. Balasubrahmanyam	Actor	Mithunam
2012	Lakshmi	Actress	Mithunam
2012	Gautham Vasudev Menon	Producer	Yeto Vellipoyindhi Manasu
2011	Nagarjuna	Actor	Rajanna
2011	Charmy Kaur	Actress	Mangala
2011	Ramesh Prasad	Producer	Rushi
2010	Samantha	Actress	Ye Maaya Chesave
2010	Chandra Siddhartha	Director	Andhari Bandhuvayya
2010	Allu Arjun	Actor	Vedam
2010	Manoj Manchu	Actor	Bindaas
2010	Sunil	Actor	Maryada Ramanna
2009	Genelia D'Souza	Actress	Katha
2009	Ram Charan	Actor	Magadheera
2009	Srikanth	Actor	Mahatma
2009	Kumara Swamy	Producer	Raju Maharaju
2009	Raghu Kunche	Music director	Bumper Offer
2008	Anushka Shetty	Actress	Arundhati
2008	P. Saraswati Rammohan	Producer	Bathukamma
2008	Allu Arjun	Actor	Parugu
2008	Sri Ramya	Actress	1940 Lo Oka Gramam
2007	Bhumika Chawla	Actress	Satyabhama
2007	Ram Charan	Actor	Chirutha (Debut)
2007	K. Rajasekhar	Producer	Goutama Buddha
2007	N. Sudhakar Reddy	Cinematographer	Anasuya
2006	Nagababu	Producer	Stalin
2006	Genelia D'Souza	Actress	Bommarillu
2006	Gangaraju Gunnam	Director	Amma Cheppindi
2005	Vadde Naveen	Actor	Naa Oopiri
2005	Priyadarshini Ram	Director	Manodu
2005	Sneha	Actress	Radha Gopalam
2004	Mahesh Babu	Actor	Arjun
2004	Saritha	Actress	Arjun
2004	Allu Arjun	Actor	Arya
2003	N. V. Prasad	Producer	Vasantham
2003	Prabha	Actress	Vegu Chukkalu
2003	Allu Arjun	Actor	Gangotri (Debut)
2003	Pavan Malhotra	Actor	Aithe
2003	Nagalakshmi	Producer	Tiger Harischandra Prasad
2002	NTR Jr.	Actor	Aadi
2002	Mahesh Babu	Actor	Takkari Donga
2002	Ravi Teja	Actor	Khadgam
2001	Manjula Ghattamaneni	Producer	Show
2001	Mahesh Babu	Actor	Murari
2001	Surya	Actor	Show
2000	Nagarjuna	Producer	Yuvakudu
2000	Srihari	Actor	Vijayaramaraju
2000	AVS	Actor	Uncle
1999	Venu Thottempudi	Actor	Swayamvaram
1999	Srihari	Actor	Police; Ramasakkanodu
1999	Laya	Actress	Swayamvaram
1998	Ramya Krishna; Srihari; Soundarya	Actress; Actor; Actress	Kante Koothurne Kanu; Sri Ramulayya; Antahpuram
1997	S.V. Krishna Reddy; Chanti	Director; Art Director	Aahvaanam; Aaro Pranam
1996	Ali; Uppalapati Surayanarayana rao Harish	Actor; Producer; Actor	Pittala Dora; Maina; Oho Naa Pellanta
1995	K.S. Sethumadhavan; Rohini; Soundarya; Shyam Prasad Reddy	Director; Actress; Producer	Stri; Stri; Ammoru; Ammoru
1994	Rajendra Prasad; Kabirlal; I.Mohan rao	Actor; Cinematographer; Writer	Madam; Bhairava Dweepam; Aame
1993	R. Narayana Murthy; A.V.S; Kanchan	Actor & Producer; Comedian; Actress	Dandora; Mister Pellam; Prema Pusthakam
1992	Akash Khurana; Divya Bharti; Annapoorna; Baby Sunaina	Actor; Actress; Character Artist; Child Artist	Dr. Ambedkar; Chittemma Mogudu; Dabbu Bhale Jabbu; Vasundhara
1991	Naresh; Roja Selvamani; Chavali Gayathri	Actor; Actress; Actress	Chitram Bhalare Vichitram; Sarpayagam; Manjeera Naadam
1990	C. Madhavi Maala; Puraanam Surya; Nirosha	Actress; Actor; Actress	Sirimuvvala simhanaadam Adavi Devitilu; Stuartpuram Police Station
1989	Jagapathi Babu; K. R. Vijaya; Seetha	Actor; Actress; Actress	Adavilo Abhimanyudu; Sutradharulu; Muthyamantha Muddu
1988	Venkatesh; Nagendra Babu; Kallu Chidambaram; S. P. Balasubrahmanyam	Actor; Producer; Actor; Singer	Swarna Kamalam; Rudraveena; Kallu; Prema
1987	Baby Sujitha; Satyanarayana	Child Artist; Actor	Chandamama Raave; Kachadevayaani
1986	Venkatesh (Debut); Archana; M. V. Raghu	Actor; Actress; Cinematographer	Kaliyuga Pandavulu; Nireekshana; Sirivennela
1985	Sudha Chandran; Kota Srinivasa Rao; P. L. Narayana	Actress; Actor; Actor	Mayuri; Pratighatana; Mayuri
1984	Vali	Costume Designer	Suvarna Sundari
1983	Vijayachander	Actor	Andhra Kesari
1982	Saritha	Actress	Kokilamma
1981	Dasari Narayana Rao	Director	Premabhishekam

== See also ==
- Nandi Awards
- Cinema of Andhra Pradesh
