= Nandi Awards of 2004 =

Indian Telugu film and TV awards ceremony

Nandi Awards presented annually by Government of Andhra Pradesh. First awarded in 1964.

== 2004 Nandi Awards Winners List ==
| Category | Winner | Film |
|---|---|---|
| Best Feature Film | Chandra Siddhartha | Aa Naluguru |
| Second Best Feature Film | Sekhar Kammula | Anand |
| Third Best Feature Film | Mohana Krishna Indraganti | Grahanam |
