= CineMAA Awards =

Telugu cinema awards

- Awarded for: Best of Tollywood films and music
- Country: India
- Presented by: Star Maa
- First award: 2004

The CineMAA Awards are presented annually by the Star Maa Group to honour artistic and technical excellence of professionals in Telugu cinema. Introduced in 2004, the CineMAA Awards are voted for by both the public and a committee of experts as per meritocracy.

Each year one Life Time Achievement Award is presented to an accomplished veteran from the Industry. The award ceremony is telecasted live over Star Maa from the Hyderabad International Convention Center of the Novotel Group in Hyderabad. In 2013, Telugu cinema category, for Best Actor and Actress was introduced for the first time.

== Popular awards ==
=== Best Film ===
The CineMAA Award for Best Film is chosen via the public of Andhra Pradesh and Telangana. The winners are listed below:

Year	Film	Producer / Productions
2003	Indra	C. Ashwani Dutt
2004	Okkadu	M. S. Raju
2005	Varsham	M. S. Raju
2008	Happy Days	Sekhar Kammula
2010	Magadheera	Allu Aravind
2011	Maryada Ramanna	Shobu Yarlagadda & Prasad Devineni
2012	Dookudu	Ram Achanta, Gopichand Achanta & Anil Sunkara
2013	Gabbar Singh	Bandla Ganesh
2015	Race Gurram	Nallamalupu Bujji
2016	Baahubali: The Beginning	Shobu Yarlagadda & Prasad Devineni

=== Best Director ===
The CineMAA Award for Best Director is chosen via the public of Andhra Pradesh and Telangana. The winners are listed below:

Year	Film	Director
2002	Jayam	Teja
2003	Okkadu	Gunasekhar
2004	Anand	Sekhar Kammula
2008	Happy Days	Sekhar Kammula
2010	Magadheera	S. S. Rajamouli
2011	Ye Maaya Chesave	Gautham Vasudev Menon
2012	Dookudu	Sreenu Vaitla
2013	Gabbar Singh	Harish Shankar
2015	Legend	Boyapati Srinu
2016	Baahubali: The Beginning	SS Rajamouli

=== Best Actor - Male ===
The CineMAA Award for Best Actor - Male is chosen via the public of Andhra Pradesh and Telangana. The winners are listed below:

Year	Film	Actor
2003	Indra	Chiranjeevi
2004	Okkadu; Simhadri	Mahesh Babu; Jr. NTR
2005	Arya; Mass	Allu Arjun; Nagarjuna
2008	Yamadonga	Jr. NTR
2010	Magadheera	Ram Charan Teja
2011	Simha	Balakrishna
2012	Dookudu	Mahesh Babu
2013	Racha	Ram Charan Teja
2015	Race Gurram	Allu Arjun
2016	Temper	Jr. NTR

=== Best Actor - Female ===
The CineMAA Award for Best Actor- Female is chosen via the public of Andhra Pradesh and Telangana. The winners are listed below:

Year	Film	Actress
2003	Indra	Aarthi Aggarwal
2005	Varsham	Trisha Krishnan
2008	Adavari Matalaku Ardhale Verule	Trisha Krishnan
2010	Arundhati	Anushka Shetty
2011	Brindavanam	Kajal Aggarwal
2012	100% Love	Tamannaah Bhatia
2013	Eega	Samantha Ruth Prabhu
2015	Manam	Samantha Ruth Prabhu
2016	Rudhramadevi	Anushka Shetty

==== Multiple Wins ====
The following individuals have received two or more Best Actress awards:

Wins	Actress
2	Trisha Krishnan; Anushka Shetty; Samantha Ruth Prabhu

=== Best Actor - Male (Tamil) ===
The CineMAA Award for Best Actor - Male (Tamil) is chosen via the public of Andhra Pradesh. The winners are listed below:

Year	Film	Actor
2013	Maattrraan	Suriya

=== Best Actor - Female (Tamil) ===
The CineMAA Award for Best Actor - Female (Tamil) is chosen via the public of Andhra Pradesh. The winners are listed below:

Year	Film	Actress	Ref(s)
2013	Thuppakki	Kajal Aggarwal

=== Best Outstanding Actor ===
The CineMAA Award for Best Outstanding Actor is chosen via the public of Andhra Pradesh and Telangana. The winners are listed below:

Year	Film	Actor
2013	Onamalu	Rajendra Prasad
2014	Manam	Nagarjuna

=== Best Outstanding Actress ===
The CineMAA Award for Best Outstanding Actress is chosen via the public of Andhra Pradesh and Telangana. The winners are listed below:

Year	Film	Actress
2013	Life Is Beautiful	Amala Akkineni

=== Best Face of The Year ===
The CineMAA Award for Best Face of The Year is chosen via the public of Andhra Pradesh and Telangana. The winners are listed below:

Year	Film	Actress
2012	Panjaa	Anjali Lavania
2013	Ee Rojullo	Reshma Rathore

=== Best Villain ===
The CineMAA Award for Best Villain is chosen via the public of Andhra Pradesh and Telangana. The winners are listed below:

Year	Film	Actor
2008	Don	Kelly Dorjee
2010	Arundhati	Sonu Sood
2011	Maryada Ramanna	Nagineedu
2012	Dookudu	Sonu Sood
2013	Eega	Sudeepa
2015	Legend	Jagapati Babu
2016	Baahubali - The Beginning	Daggubati Rana

=== Best Comedian ===
The CineMAA Award for Best Comedian is chosen via the public of Andhra Pradesh and Telangana. The winners are listed below:

Year	Film	Comedian
2003	Manmadhudu	Bramhanandam
2004	Dil	Venu Madhav
2005	Sye	Venu Madhav
2008	Dhee	Bramhanandam
2010	Konchem Ishtam Konchem Kashtam	Bramhanandam
2011	Adhurs	Bramhanandam
2012	Dookudu	Bramhanandam
2013	Gabbar Singh	Antyakshari Team
2014	Hrudaya Kaleyam	Sampoornesh Babu
2015	Oka Laila Kosam	Ali
2016	Bengal Tiger	Prudhvi Raj

=== Best Music Director ===
The CineMAA Award for Best Music Director is chosen via the public of Andhra Pradesh and Telangana. The winners are listed below:

Year	Film	Music Director
2003	Indra	Mani Sharma
2004	Okkadu	Mani Sharma
2005	Varsham	Devi Sri Prasad
2008	Happy Days	Mickey J. Meyer
2010	Arya 2	Devi Sri Prasad
2011	Ye Maaya Chesave	A. R. Rahman
2012	Dookudu	S. Thaman
2013	Gabbar Singh	Devi Sri Prasad
2015	1: Nenokkadine	Devi Sri Prasad
2016	S/o Satyamurthy; Srimanthudu; Kumari 21F	Devi Sri Prasad

=== Best Male Debut ===
The CineMAA Award for Best Male Debut is chosen via the public of Andhra Pradesh and Telangana. The winners are listed below:

Year	Film	Actor
2003	Jayam	Nithiin
2004	Gangotri	Allu Arjun
2005	Donga Dongadi	Manoj Manchu
2008	Chirutha	Ram Charan Teja
2010	Josh	Naga Chaitanya
2011	Leader	Rana Daggubati
2012	Prema Kavali	Aadi
2013	Tuneega Tuneega	Sumanth Ashwin
2015	Pilla Nuvvu Leni Jeevitam	Sai Dharam Tej
2016	Akhil	Akhil Akkineni

=== Best Female Debut ===
The CineMAA Award for Best Female Debut is chosen via the public of Andhra Pradesh and Telangana. The winners are listed below:

Year	Film	Actress
2003	Idiot	Rakshita
2004	Satyam	Genelia D'Souza
2005	Anand	Kamalinee Mukherjee
2008 2009	Desamuduru	Hansika Motwani
2009	Josh	Karthika Nair
2010	Oy!	Shamili
2011	Ye Maaya Chesave	Samantha
2012	Anaganaga O Dheerudu	Shruti Haasan
2013	Andala Rakshasi	Lavanya Tripathi
2015	Oohalu Gusagusalade	Raashii Khanna
2016	Kanche	Pragya Jaiswal

=== Best Debut Director ===
The CineMAA Award for Best Debut Director is chosen via the public of Andhra Pradesh and Telangana. The winners are listed below:

Year	Film	Director
2003	Aadi	V. V. Vinayak
2004	Okariki Okaru	Rasool Ellore
2005	Mass	Raghava Lawrence
2008	Lakshyam	Srivas
2010	Konchem Ishtam Konchem Kashtam	Kishore Kumar
2012	Ala Modalaindi	Nandini Reddy
2013	Onamalu and Andala Rakshasi	Kranthi Madhav and Hanu Raghavapudi

== Best Lyricist ==
The CineMAA Award for Best Lyricist is chosen via the public of Andhra Pradesh and Telangana. The winners are listed below:

Year	Film	Winner
2008	Happy Days	Vanamali (Arey Rey)
2010	Magadheera	Chandrabose(Panchadhara Bomma)
2013	Gabbar Singh	Devi Sri Prasad (Pilla)
2015	Manam	Chandrabose(Kanipenchina )
2016	Kanche	Sirivennela Seetharama Sastry

== Best Editor ==
The CineMAA Award for Best Editor is chosen via the public of Andhra Pradesh and Telangana. The winners are listed below:

Year	Film	Winner
2008	Chirutha	Varma
2010	Magadheera	Kotagiri Venkateswara Rao
2013	Gabbar Singh and Damarukam	Goutham Raju
2015	Race Gurram	Goutham Raju
2016	Baahubali: The Beginning; Srimanthudu	Kotagiri Venkateswara Rao

== Best Costume Designer ==
The CineMAA Award for Best Costume Designer is chosen via the public of Andhra Pradesh and Telangana. The winners are listed below:

Year	Film	Winner
2013	Damarukam	Payal

== Best Fight Master ==
The CineMAA Award for Best Fight Master is chosen via the public of Andhra Pradesh and Telangana. The winners are listed below:

Year	Film	Winner
2013	Damarukam	Vijay
2015	Legend	Ram Lakshman
2016	Baahubali: The Beginning	Peter Hein

== Best Visual Effects ==
The CineMAA Award for Best Visual Effects is chosen via the public of Andhra Pradesh and Telangana. The winners are listed below:

Year	Film	Winner
2013	Eega	Makuta VFX

== Best Art Director ==
The CineMAA Award for Best Art Director is chosen via the public of Andhra Pradesh and Telangana. The winners are listed below:

Year	Film	Winner
2008	Yamadonga	Anand Sai
2010	Magadheera	Ravi

== Best Screenplay ==
The CineMAA Award for Best Screenplay is chosen via the public of Andhra Pradesh and Telangana. The winners are listed below:

Year	Film	Writer
2008	Happy Days	Sekhar Kammula

== Best Dialogue ==
The CineMAA Award for Best Dialogue is chosen via the public of Andhra Pradesh and Telangana. The winners are listed below:

Year	Film	Writer
2008	Yamadonga	M. Ratnam
2014	Legend	M. Ratnam

== Best Story ==
The CineMAA Award for Best Story is chosen via the public of Andhra Pradesh and Telangana. The winners are listed below:

Year	Film	Writer
2003	Santosham	Dasarath
2005	7G Brindavan Colony	Sri Raghava
2008	Happy Days	Sekhar Kammula

== Best Male Playback Singer ==
Year	Winner	Song	Film
2003	S. P. Balasubrahmanyam	"Paadana Teeyaga"	Vasu
2004	S. P. Balasubrahmanyam	"Ekkadunnavamma"	Okariki Okaru
2005	S. P. Balasubrahmanyam	"All Songs"	Swarabhishekam
2008	Karthik	"Padametu Pothunna"	Happy Days
2010	Anuj Gurwara	"Panchadhaara"	Magadheera
2016	Karthik	"Pacha Bottesina"	Baahubali: The Beginning

== Best Female Playback Singer ==
Year	Winner	Song	Film
2003	Usha	"Nee Tholisariga"	Santosham
2005	K. S. Chithra	"Nuvvosthanante"	Varsham
2008	Geetha Madhuri	"Chamka Chamka"	Chirutha
2010	Nikita Nigam	"Dheera Dheera"	Magadheera
2011	Shreya Ghoshal	"Seetha Seemantham" & "Chali Chaliga"	Sri Rama Rajyam & Mr. Perfect
2012	Ramya NSK	"Poovai Poovai"	Dookudu
2013	Gopika Poornima	"Laali Laali"	Damarukam
2013	Mamta Sharma (Special Jury)	"Kevvu Keka"	Gabbar Singh
2013	Shweta Pandit (Special Jury)	"Amararama'	Shirdi Sai
2013	K. S. Chithra (Duet)	"Nee Choopule"	Endukante... Premanta!
2014	K. S. Chithra	"Gopikamma"	Mukunda

== Best Choreographer ==
Year	Film	Winner
2008	Yamadonga	Prem Rakshith
2011	Maryada Ramanna	Jani
2013	Gabbar Singh	Ganesh

== Critic's awards ==
=== Best Actor (Jury) ===
Year	Film	Actor
2003	Aadi	Jr. NTR
2005	Aa Naluguru	Rajendra Prasad
2008	Desamuduru	Allu Arjun
2010	Arya 2	Allu Arjun
2011	Darling	Prabhas
2012	Rajanna	Nagarjuna
2013	Shirdi Sai	Akkineni Nagarjuna
2015	1: Nenokkadine	Mahesh Babu
2016	Rudhramadevi	Allu Arjun

=== Best Actress (Jury) ===
The CineMAA Award for Best Actress (Jury) is chosen by a selected panel of eminent film personalities. The award is given to the leading actress whose performance is recognised by the jury members as well as the critics. Past winners are:

Year	Film	Actress
2003	Avunu Valliddaru Ista Paddaru	Kalyani
2005	Naa Autograph	Bhumika Chawla
2011	Vedam	Anushka Shetty
2012	Sri Rama Rajyam	Nayanthara
2013	Ishq	Nithya Menen
2014	Loukyam	Rakul Preet Singh

=== Best Director (Jury) ===
Year	Film	Director
2003	Aadi	V. V. Vinayak
2005	Arya	Sukumar
2011	Vedam	Krish
2012	Sri Rama Rajyam	Bapu
2013	Mithunam	Tanikella Bharani

=== Best Film (Jury) ===
Year	Film	Director
2011	Prasthanam	Deva Katta
2012	Sri Rama Rajyam	Bapu
2013	Shirdi Sai	K. Raghavendra Rao
2014	Manam	Vikram Kumar

=== Special Jury ===
Year	Film	Actor
2011	Maryada Ramanna	Sunil
2011	Vedam	Nagayya
2012	Rajanna	Baby Annie
2012	Dookudu	M. S. Narayana

=== Best Supporting Actor ===
Year	Film	Actor
2003	Khadgam	Prakash Raj
2004	Amma Nanna O Tamila Ammayi	Prakash Raj
2005	Aa Naluguru	Kota Srinivasa Rao
2008	Yamadonga	Mohan Babu
2011	Prasthanam	Sai Kumar
2012	Dookudu	Prakash Raj

=== Best Supporting Actress ===
Year	Film	Actor
2003	Khadgam	Sangeetha
2004	Amma Nanna O Tamila Ammayi	Jayasudha
2005	Anand	Satya Krishnan
2008	Sri Mahalakshmi	Suhasini Maniratnam
2011	Leader	Suhasini Maniratnam
2012	Anaganaga O Dheerudu	Lakshmi Manchu

== Special Appreciation ==
- 2016 Krish - Kanche
- 2016 Gunasekhar - Rudhramadevi
- 2003 Vikram - Sivaputrudu

== Lifetime Contribution ==
The CineMAA Award for Life Time Contribution is chosen via the public of Andhra Pradesh and Telangana. The winners are listed below:

Year	Awardee
2003	Dasari Narayana Rao
2005	D. Rama Naidu
2008	K. Viswanath
2010	C. Narayanareddy
2011	S. P. Balasubrahmanyam
2012	K. Raghavendra Rao
2013	P. C. Sriram
2015	Krishna
