= Gangotri (2003 film) =

2003 Telugu film by K. Raghavendra Rao

- Directed by: K. Raghavendra Rao
- Written by: Story & Screenplay: Chinni Krishna; Dialogues: Viswanath
- Produced by: C. Aswini Dutt; Allu Aravind (Presenter)
- Starring: Allu Arjun; Aditi Agarwal; Prakash Raj; Suman
- Cinematography: Chota K. Naidu
- Edited by: Kotagiri Venkateswara Rao
- Music by: M.M. Keeravani
- Production company: United Producers
- Release date: 28 March 2003
- Running time: 141 minutes
- Country: India
- Language: Telugu

Gangotri is a 2003 Indian Telugu-language drama film directed by K. Raghavendra Rao, marking his 100th directorial venture. The film was produced by C. Aswani Dutt and presented by Allu Aravind. Written by Chinni Krishna, it features Allu Arjun and Aditi Agarwal in their debut lead roles. Music was composed by M. M. Keeravani and the cinematography was handled by Chota K. Naidu.

Released on 28 March 2003, the film was later dubbed and released in Malayalam as Simhakutty and in Hindi.

== Plot ==
Neelakantam Naidu, a powerful factionist, has a devoted follower, Narasimha, who is ready to sacrifice his life for his master. After years of misfortune with childbirth, Neelakantam's wife Tulasi gives birth to a daughter. Following the advice of priests, they name her Gangotri and warn that she is afflicted with jalagandam (a water-related curse). To protect her, they suggest taking her to the holy site of Gangotri in the Himalayas for a ritual bath (abhyangana snanam) for 15 years. This is believed to remove all dangers.

Gangotri grows up under strict protection, with Simhadri, Narasimha’s son, acting as her companion and entertainer. Their bond deepens over time, and they become close friends. However, tragedy strikes when Simhadri's mother is killed in a trap intended for Neelakantam. As Gangotri matures, her paternal aunt begins to impose restrictions on her interactions with Simhadri, viewing their closeness as inappropriate. When Simhadri secretly visits Gangotri, they are caught by Neelakantam, leading to accusations and violence. Neelakantam's sister maligns their relationship, and Neelakantam beats Simhadri.

Narasimha intervenes, resulting in a misunderstanding between him and Neelakantam. Believing Narasimha has ulterior motives, Neelakantam plants bombs at Narasimha's house, killing him. Simhadri, unaware of this at first, confronts Neelakantam upon learning the truth and vows to marry Gangotri within a year. He retreats to the holy site of Gangotri and waits for her final ritual bath.

Gangotri eventually arrives at the holy site, and the two attempt to elope. However, Neelakantam intercepts them and stabs Simhadri. In despair, Gangotri attempts suicide, prompting Neelakantam to realise the depth of their love. Simhadri regains consciousness after hearing their favourite flute tune. The couple reunites and embrace, overcoming the obstacles in their path.

== Cast ==
- Allu Arjun as Simhadri
  - Master Teja as Young Simhadri
- Aditi Agarwal as Gangotri (Voice by Sunitha)
  - Baby Kavya as Young Gangotri
- Prakash Raj as Neelakantam Naidu
- Suman as Narasimha
- Seetha as Simhadri's mother
- Pragathi as Tulasi
- Telangana Shakuntala as Durgamma
- Brahmanandam as Hindi Lecturer
- Sunil as Exam Invigilator
- Tanikella Bharani as Anjaneya Sastri
- M. S. Narayana
- Subbaraya Sarma
- A.V.S.
- Banerjee
- Sobha

== Production ==
Gangotri marked the 100th directorial venture of K. Raghavendra Rao. The film was jointly produced by C. Aswani Dutt and Allu Aravind under the banner of United Producers. It introduced Allu Arjun, the second son of producer Allu Aravind, and Aditi Agarwal in their debut lead roles.

For this milestone project, Raghavendra Rao selected the Himalayas, particularly Gangotri, as the location for the film’s opening shot and several pivotal scenes. The choice of this sacred site aligned with the film’s storyline. In September 2002, the production team traveled to New Delhi before proceeding to the Himalayas to begin filming. The "Ganga" song was shot at Gangotri starting from 25 September 2002.

By November 2002, the team returned to Hyderabad after completing an extensive schedule in North India, which included filming key scenes and two songs in locations such as Haridwar.

== Soundtrack ==
Gangotri

Soundtrack album by M. M. Keeravani
- Released: 16 February 2003
- Recorded: 2003
- Genre: Soundtrack
- Length: 30:41
- Label: Aditya Music
- Producer: M. M. Keeravani

M. M. Keeravani chronology
Jism (2003)	Gangotri (2003)	Saaya (2003)

The music was composed by M. M. Keeravani and released on Aditya Music label. The audio launch was held on 17 February 2003 at Annapurna Studios. In an audio review, Sreya Sunil of Idlebrain.com unfavourably compared the film's soundtracks to Keeravani's Hindi works but rated several songs four out of five.

Track-List
No.	Title	Lyrics	Singer(s)	Length
1.	"Nuvvu Nenu"	Chandrabose	S. P. Balasubrahmanyam, Malavika	4:51
2.	"Oka Thotalo"	Chandrabose	S. P. B. Charan, Malavika	3:54
3.	"Vallanki Pitta"	Chandrabose	Kousalya, D. Aiswarya	3:45
4.	"Railu Bandi"	Chandrabose	S. P. B. Charan, Srivardhini	3:29
5.	"Mavayyadi Mogalthooru"	Chandrabose	Mano, Smita	4:29
6.	"Ganga"	Chandrabose	S. P. B. Charan, Sunitha Upadrashta	4:16
7.	"Jevana Vahini"	Veturi	M. M. Keeravani, Ganga, Kalpana	5:57
Total length:				30:41

== Reception ==
Gudipoodi Srihari of The Hindu wrote, "Director Raghavendra Rao renders the film as a lesson to show how various elements in a film can be best used to create a perfect balance" and concluded that "The film is worth watching". Jeevi of Idlebrain.com rated the film three out of five stars and wrote, "Over all its an average film". A critic from Sify wrote, "In spite of all this Raghavendra Rao fails to lift this adolescent love story, as there are no major twists in the plot".

== Awards ==
- Allu Arjun won the Nandi Award for Best Debut Hero
- Allu Arjun won the Santosham Best Young Performers Award
- Allu Arjun won the CineMAA Award for Best Male Debut
- Prakash Raj won the Nandi Award for Best Villain
