= Arya (2004 film) =

2004 Indian film by Sukumar

- Theatrical release poster
- Directed by: Sukumar
- Written by: Sukumar
- Produced by: Dil Raju
- Starring: Allu Arjun; Anu Mehta; Siva Balaji
- Cinematography: R. Rathnavelu
- Edited by: Marthand K. Venkatesh
- Music by: Devi Sri Prasad
- Production company: Sri Venkateswara Creations
- Distributed by: Sri Venkateswara Creations
- Release date: 7 May 2004
- Running time: 151 minutes
- Country: India
- Language: Telugu
- Box office: est.₹31.1 (equivalent to ₹120.23 in 2026) crore

Arya is a 2004 Indian Telugu-language romantic action comedy film written and directed by Sukumar in his directoral debut. Produced by Dil Raju under Sri Venkateswara Creations banner, the film stars Allu Arjun, Anu Mehta, and Siva Balaji. The music was composed by Devi Sri Prasad and cinematography was by R. Rathnavelu. The plot revolves around Arya, an outgoing and free-spirited boy falling in love with Geetha, an introverted girl who is on the shield of another person Ajay.

Arya was released on 7 May 2004, the film received positive response and was commercially successful, grossing ₹31.1 crore worldwide. It has developed a cult following over the years. The film was remade in Bengali (Bangladesh) as Badha (2005), in Odia as Pagala Premi (2007), in Bengali as Pagal Premi (2007), in Sinhala as Adaraye Namayen (2008) and in Tamil as Kutty (2010). A spiritual sequel titled Arya 2 was released in 2009.

Arya is considered one of the best films of Allu Arjun and provided a major breakthrough in his career as an actor and brought recognition for Sukumar as a director in Telugu cinema.

== Plot ==
Geetanjali a.k.a. Geetha, a college student, goes to Kanyakumari on a trip. She finds a poem in a diary left on a beach and signs in it, saying that she wishes the poet will succeed in his love. Later on, her anklet falls into the ocean, and a guy jumps into the water in front of her eyes, but no one sees him resurfacing. However, Geetha did not see who jumped in the ocean. She dreams about the incident frequently thinking that the guy who jumped has died, but her friends ask her to forget it.

Back to the present in Visakhapatnam, here comes Ajay, a spoiled college student and the son of the local MP Avataram. He likes to flirt with beautiful girls and wants them to be his girlfriends. One day he sees Geetha and proposes to her. When she refuses, he threatens to jump from the top of the college building. Afraid of being held responsible for a death, Geetha accepts the proposal with the thought that some guy has already died for her, and she doesn't want anyone else to get hurt because of her and starts dating him. Arya is a happy-go-lucky guy who enjoys his life with friends and kids. On his first day in college, he sees Geetha, who was just confessing her love to Ajay, who was at the top of the college building, threatening to jump. Charmed by her beauty, Arya falls in love with her and proposes to her. One day Avataram arranges a party in his house, and it so turns out that Ajay introduces Geetha to his father and persuades him to fix their marriage. Ajay's father, who initially pretended to accept his son's marriage with Geetha, turns tables upside down by introducing another girl Lalasa and announces that his son is going to marry Lalasa. He threatens his son not to marry anyone except Lalasa. Being embarrassed by the situation and helpless, Ajay sits down and starts to get frustrated. Arya, who loves Geetha so much that he never hesitated to help her, decides to bring Ajay to Geetha and helps them elope. On their way, they are followed by Avataram's henchmen. They eventually find a train and get into it.

When they get down of the train in the night, they are shocked to see the leader of Avataram's henchmen, who forces Geetha to come with him, defying his boss' order. On the other hand, Ajay remains helpless, while Arya fights all the men and finally defeats them, rescuing Ajay and Geetha. They walk on to the nearby town, which happens to be Arya's hometown. Being tired, the three go to bed.

The next morning they wake up and realize that Ajay is missing. Arya tries to convince Geetha that Ajay left to win over his father. This leaves private time for Arya and Geetha, and they grow close to each other. Geetha starts liking Arya and begins to understand him. When she tries to confess it to him, Ajay and his father return. Avataram agrees to get Ajay married to Geetha.

On the day of the wedding, Geetha finds out that Arya was the guy who dove into the sea for her anklet and realizes that he came into her life much before Ajay. She realizes that while Ajay blackmailed her into loving him; Arya just wanted to see her happy. Geetha also realizes that Arya truly loves her, while Ajay was just acting on his impulse of wanting what he couldn't have. She leaves the wedding hall in tears and confesses her love to Arya, and they both reconcile with each other, and this time he successfully throws the stone into the Plastic Coke Cup, indicating he truly succeeded in his love.

== Cast ==
- Allu Arjun as Arya
- Anuradha Mehta as Geethanjali aka Geetha
- Siva Balaji as Ajay
- Vidya as Shanti, Geetha's best friend and Arya's well wisher.
- Rajan P. Dev as MP Avataram, Ajay's father
- Subbaraju as Subbu
- Sunil as "Punch" Falaknama, Train Ticket Examiner
- Venu Madhav as Ajay's friend
- Sudha as Geetha's mother
- J. V. Ramana Murthi as Priest
- Shravya as one of Arya's young friends
- Babloo as Arya's friend
- Sandra Jaichandran as one of Geetha's friends
- Devi Charan
- Jogi Naidu
- Krishnam Raju
- Prudhviraj as Reddy
- Srikanth Addala (special appearance)
- Abhinayasri in item number "Aa Ante Amalapuram"

== Production ==
Sukumar began working on the script of Arya in Visakhapatnam before joining the sets of V. V. Vinayak's Dil (2003). Its producer Dil Raju assured that he would produce the film if Dil becomes a commercial success. Sukumar chose to narrate the story of a boy who confess his love to a girl right in the beginning, opposed to films like Darr (1993), Kabhie Haan Kabhie Naa (1994), and Kaadhal Kondein (2003) where the protagonist's love/obsession for the female lead is revealed towards the end, as he found that idea an "obsolete" one.

Raju was impressed with Sukumar's script and Allu Arjun was selected as its protagonist after considering Ravi Teja, Nithin, and Prabhas. Anuradha Mehta and Siva Balaji were chosen for the other two lead roles. R. Rathnavelu and Devi Sri Prasad were chosen as the film's director of photography and music director respectively; they both collaborated with Sukumar in many of his future projects. The film was launched on 20 November 2003 with Chiranjeevi clapping the first shot and Pawan Kalyan switching on the camera.

== Soundtrack ==
Arya

Soundtrack album to Arya by Devi Sri Prasad
- Released: 16 April 2004
- Recorded: 2004
- Genre: Feature film soundtrack
- Length: 30:42
- Language: Telugu
- Label: Aditya Music
- Producer: Devi Sri Prasad

Devi Sri Prasad chronology
Abhi (2004)	Arya (2004)	Shankar Dada MBBS (2004)

The music was composed by Devi Sri Prasad. The success and popularity of the song "Aa Ante Amalapuram" song eventually led to its adaptation in the 2012 Hindi film Maximum.

Telugu Track listing
No.	Title	Lyrics	Singer(s)	Length
1.	"You Rock My World"	Viswa	Shaan, Premji Amaren	5:00
2.	"Edo Priya Ragam Vintunna"	Sirivennela Seetharama Sastry	Sagar, Sumangali	5:08
3.	"O My Brotheru"	Sirivennela Seetharama Sastry	Ravi Verma	5:04
4.	"Thakadimithom"	Surendra Krishna	Tippu	5:31
5.	"Feel My Love"	Chandrabose	KK, Clinton Cerejo	4:55
6.	"Aa Ante Amalapuram"	Veturi	Malathy, Ranjith	5:04
Total length:				30:42

Malayalam (Dub)

Music is composed by Devi Sri Prasad and lyrics were penned by Rajeev Alunkal

Malayalam Track listing
No.	Title	Singer(s)	Length
1.	"Etho Priya Ragam"	Madhu Balakrishnan	5:09
2.	"Thakadhimithom"	Jassie Gift	4:59
3.	"Aa Kande Alakapuram"	Reshmi, Devi Sri Prasad	4:59
4.	"You Rock My Love"	Afsal, Devi Sri Prasad	4:39
5.	"Etho Priya Ragam"	Shivani	5:09
6.	"Oh My Brothere"	Alex	4:49
7.	"Aarya Proud of Youth"	Anwar Sadath, Sayanora Philip	3:37
8.	"Feel My Love"	Vidhu Prathap	4:57

== Reception ==
=== Critical reception ===
Arya received highly positive reviews from critics. idlebrain.com gave a review stating, "You feel like you are watching a Mani Rathnam film. There is a soul in the film and you end up having a thin layer of tears in your eyes while leaving the theater. This film announces the arrival of Sukumar – director – a class apart. 'Aarya' is a must watch film for all Telugu film lovers. Don't miss it" and rated the film 4/5, calling the film "A class apart". IndiaGlitz gave a review stating "To start with, the hype machine was at work incessantly before the release of the movie. And after watching the film you also feel that there is a movie that is every inch worth its pre-release hype. Not only Aarya is expected to lead the pack in the long summer of seemingly never-ending releases but also give the hero of the film, Allu Arjun, a new identity. Aarya is an unabashed package showcasing Allu Arjun and his dancing and fighting abilities. The thing it looks like it will work at the box-office", further calling the film "A cocktail of fun and more fun". fullhyderabad.com gave a review stating "Aarya is not at all what you expect it to be. It is a special package that consists of fun, entertainment, laughs, frolic, merriment, high times, bashes and more. It has them all. Romance, eternal love, mush, flowers, embraces, sacrifices, sunsets. It has them ALL. Action, fights, stunts, feats, tricks, battles, blood, bullies, henchmen, chases. Did we mention that this has it all? Emotions, sentiments, passion, craze and feelings. See one. See all," and rated the film 7/10.

=== Box office ===
Arya made on a budget of ₹4 crore, grossed about ₹30 crore.

The film's dubbed version in Malayalam collected ₹1.1 crore in Kerala. Owing to the film's success, Allu Arjun received major acclaim across the region and the Malayali people and earned him fanbase there.

== Dubbed version ==
The film's dubbed version in Malayalam collected ₹1.1 crore in Kerala. Owing to the film's big success, Allu Arjun received major acclaim across the region and the Malayali people and earned him fanbase there. In 2011, it was dubbed in Hindi as Arya Ki Prem Pratigya.

== Awards ==
52nd Filmfare Awards

- Best Director – Sukumar

2004 CineMAA Awards

- Best Director (Jury) – Sukumar
- Best Screenplay - Sukumar
- Best Editor - Marthand K Venkatesh
- Sensational Producer - Dil Raju

2004 Nandi Awards

- Best Screenplay Writer – Sukumar
- Special Jury – Allu Arjun
- Best Fight Master - Ram-Lakshman
- Best Male Playback Singer - Sagar

2004 Santosham Film Awards

- Santosham Best Young Performers Award – Allu Arjun
- Best first film Director - Sukumar
- Best new Female Singer - Malathi
- Best Costumer - Kumar
- Best item Dancer - Abhinayasri

2004 Gemini TV Awards

- Best Director – Sukumar
- Best Actor – Allu Arjun

== Bibliography ==
- Chinnarayana, Pulagam (18 October 2015). సినిమా వెనుక స్టోరీ: ఫీల్ మై లవ్ [Behind the scenes: Feel my love] (in Telugu). Sakshi Funday. Archived from the original on 10 June 2016.
