= Grazing Goat Pictures =

Indian film and TV production company

Grazing Goat Pictures Pvt.Ltd
- Type: Private
- Industry: Entertainment; Motion picture
- Founded: 21 November 2011
- Headquarters: Mumbai, Maharashtra, India
- Key people: Akshay Kumar; Twinkle Khanna; Ashvini Yardi; Vinod Kumar Arora (director); Sachin Sudhir Yardi (director)
- Products: Movies; Film production; Film distribution; Television shows
- Parent: Cape of Good Films

Grazing Goat Pictures is an Indian film and TV production house launched in 2011 by Hindi film actor Akshay Kumar and Ashvini Yardi. Its first film was OMG – Oh My God! which won the National Film Award for Best Adapted Screenplay. The next film in their banner Fugly opened to mixed reviews.

The company has also produced regional languages films like 72 Miles (Marathi) and Bhaji in Problem (Punjabi). Both of these opened to positive reviews from critics. The former one was screened at the London and Pune International Film Festivals and won 3 awards at the 2014 Maharashtra State Film Awards ceremony. The company has also produced the Hindi soap opera Jamai Raja which airs on Zee TV. Kumar appeared in all Grazing Goat productions except 72 Miles.

A YouTube channel FOMO Fashion On My Own, backed by the company, was launched in 2013. It has been credited as India's first Hindi fashion channel.

== History ==
Akshay Kumar had launched production house Cape Of Good Films in 2008. Ashvini Yardi had previously worked with Colors and Zee TV as Head of Programming. When she read the script of OMG – Oh My God!, she decided to produce it and launched a company in association with Kumar. The company is based in Juhu, Mumbai and the head office's interior is designed by Kumar's wife Twinkle Khanna.

=== Hindi films ===
The company's first film was the Umesh Shukla-directed satirical comedy–drama OMG – Oh My God!, produced in association with Viacom 18 Motion Pictures, Spice Studio and Paresh Rawal's Playtime Creation company. A song was added against the director's wishes. Built on a small budget and based on a Gujarati stage-play titled Kanji Virudh Kanji, it was a remake of the 2001 Australian film The Man Who Sued God. The story depicted the struggles of an atheist Hindu man who sued God after his shop is destroyed by an earthquake. Kumar appeared as Lord Krishna in the film. Sukanya Verma of Rediff.com appreciated the film for bringing "attention to the misuse and commercialisation of religion". Anupama Chopra praised Rawal's acting but felt that the rest character's were flimsy and film's "intentions [were] good, but the preaching [was] boring". The film received poor initial collection at the box office but because of word of mouth it picked up and proved to be a commercial success. The film was banned in Malaysia and the United Arab Emirates and faced protests in Punjab where several shows had to be cancelled. A police case was lodged against film's writer, director, Kumar and Rawal for hurting religious sentiments. Bhavesh Mandalia and Umesh Shukla won the National Film Award for Best Adapted Screenplay while Kumar received a nomination for Filmfare Award for Best Supporting Actor. OMG – Oh My God! has inspired a Telugu remake titled Gopala Gopala which featured Daggubati Venkatesh and Pawan Kalyan in important roles. It was directed by Kishore Kumar Pardasany. Reportedly, the producers of PK offered ₹8 crore (US$830,000) to Shukla to stop shooting. He is planning a sequel. Kumar said that he wanted to make "socially relevant" films.

The company had signed Nargis Fakhri for a 3-film deal. In May 2012 it was announced that she would be part of Khiladi 786. However, in the same month she was removed from the cast. The film was produced by Hari Om Entertainment and Asin was cast for the lead role opposite Kumar. The company's second film was the Kabir Sadanand-directed drama thriller Fugly, featuring debutantes Mohit Marwah, Olympic medallist boxer Vijender Singh, Arfi Lamba and Kiara Advani in lead roles. Kumar and Salman Khan did cameo appearances in the film. Jimmy Shergill played a corrupt police officer who frames 4 friends for a murder he has committed and asks for a large sum of money in return for closing the case. The film failed to generate positive response from critics. Shubhra Gupta of The Financial Express said that it "isn’t exactly palatable". Vinayak Chakravorty of India Today said that the film had mixed the elements of Rang De Basanti and Dil Chahta Hai but missed out on their magic. He called the narrative "half-baked" and said that the film "[lost] its plot". It was produced under a budget of ₹10 crore (US$1.0 million).

Kumar was paired opposite Amy Jackson in Prabhu Deva's comedy-drama Singh Is Bliing (2015). (Note: This was not a sequel to Kumar's 2008 film Singh Is Kinng.) The film's worldwide gross was estimated to be around ₹116.27 crore (US$12 million).

=== Regional cinema ===
Kumar and Yardi produced their first Marathi venture 72 Miles Ek Pravas. Inspired from Ashok Vhatkar's novel of the same name, the film showed the problems faced by a teenager boy (Chinmay Sant) who ran away from his boarding school to reach his house which was at a distance of 72 miles from the school. It won three awards at the 2013–2014 Maharashtra State Film Awards—Best Grameen Film. Shakti Shetty wrote in Mid-Day that "the emotions won’t [elude]" the viewers. He praised Tambe's performance by calling it "one of the strongest female performances in recent times". Afternoon Despatch & Courier's reviewer Sandeep Hattangadi called it "quite touching" and "the first of its kind in Marathi". The film was shortlisted for screening at the London and Pune International Film Festivals. Their second Marathi film was Gauri Sarwate-directed Anntar. It was shot in London.

The company's next regional film was the Punjabi language comedy Bhaji in Problem (2013). It was produced in association with Viacom 18 Motion Pictures and distributed globally by Krian Media. The film was directed by Smeep Kang. Built on a small budget of ₹5 crore (US$520,000), it collected ₹17 crore (US$1.8 million) at the box office. Distributors in the state of Punjab paid record prices for the film after film viewers expressed their eagerness to watch it. Kumar made a guest starring in the film. Sameer Valecha of Punjabimania.com noted that the film "has its own merits and will stand tall on them" and appreciated the actors for their performance. Indian spinner Harbhajan Singh also appeared in the film. After the films' success Kumar said that he will produce more regional language films. In an interview given to The New Indian Express, Ashvini Yardi said that "We want to make Grazing Goat Pictures a global player." She is also planning to produce Bengali films.

=== Hindi television ===
Grazing Goat Pictures produced their first Hindi soap opera Jamai Raja starring Ravi Dubey Nia Sharma, Achint Kaur and Delnaz Paul. It airs on Zee TV and completed 100 episodes in December 2014. The company plans to produce more fictional shows. An adaptation of Kanika Dhillon's novel Bombay Duck Is A Fish has also been planned.

== FOMO Fashion On My Own ==
In 2013 Grazing Goat Pictures launched its Internet division Grazing Goats Digital, whose second product was India's first Hindi fashion channel called FOMO Fashion On My Own. Aimed at trend-conscious women, this YouTube channel provides online tutorials on various fashion subjects.

== Filmography ==
=== Films ===
Title	Year	Notes	Ref
OMG – Oh My God!	2012		
72 Miles	2013		
Bhaji in Problem	2013		
Fugly	2014		
Singh Is Bliing	2015		

=== Television ===
- Jamai Raja (2014–2017)
