= Ashvini Yardi =

Indian Bollywood film and TV serials producer

- Occupation: producer

Ashvini Yardi is an Indian producer of Hindi movies such as OMG – Oh My God!, 72 Miles, Bhaji in Problem, Fugly and Singh Is Bliing.

After having a 20-year-long career in television, Yardi formed Grazing Goat Pictures with actor Akshay Kumar in December 2011. At Zee TV she opted for shows such as Saat Phere, Sailaab, Kasamh Se, Sarrkar, Teen Bahuraaniyaan, Banoo Main Teri Dulhann, Ghar ki Lakshmi Betiyaan, Banegi Apni Baat, among several others. She also conceptualized the singing reality show Sa Re Ga Ma Pa Challenge and Lil' Champs before leaving to join Colors. At Colors, she brought in shows such as Uttaran, Balika Vadhu, Bigg Boss, Khatron Ke Khiladi, Veer Shivaji, Laado and took the new channel zooming to the No 1 spot.

She has earned a BA in Psychology, Advertising and Marketing from XIC, Mumbai.

== Filmography ==
=== Films ===
Year	Title	Director	Production House
2012	OMG – Oh My God!	Umesh Shukla	Grazing Goat Pictures, Wave Cinemas, Spice Studios
2013	72 Miles		
2013	Bhaji in Problem		
2014	Fugly		
2015	Singh is Bling		

=== Television ===
Year	Title	Channel	Notes	Ref.
2014–2017	Jamai Raja	Zee TV	Producer	
2016–2017	Waaris	&TV	Producer	
2022	Spy Bahu	Colors TV	Producer	

=== Web series ===
- Jamai 2.0 (2019)
