= Kishore Kumar Pardasani =

Indian film director

Kishore Kumar Pardasani (also known as Dolly) is an Indian film director known for his Telugu films Konchem Ishtam Konchem Kashtam, Tadakha, Gopala Gopala and Katamarayudu.

== Early life and career ==
Kishore was born in Vijayawada and was brought up in Vijayanagaram. After pursuing law at Maharaja College at Vijayanagaram, Kishore shifted to Hyderabad and joined the film industry and went to assist Sreenu Vaitla and V. V. Vinayak.

Kishore made his directorial debut with Konchem Ishtam Konchem Kashtam (2009). He came up with the idea of interval point first during the scripting stage. He then approached Siddharth who accepted to act after hearing the script. The film received positive reviews and did well.

== Filmography ==
Year	Film	Cast	Notes
2009	Konchem Ishtam Konchem Kashtam	Siddharth, Tamannaah	Debut as a director
2013	Tadakha	Naga Chaitanya, Tamannaah, Andrea, Sunil	Remake of Vettai
2015	Gopala Gopala	Pawan Kalyan, Daggubati Venkatesh	Remake of OMG - Oh My God!
2017	Katamarayudu	Pawan Kalyan, Shruti Hassan	Remake of Veeram
