= Sirikonda (surname) =

Sirikonda (Telugu: సిరికొండ) is a Telugu surname. Notable people with the surname include:

- Sirikonda Madhusudhana Chary (born 1956), Indian politician
- Sirikonda Vikram (born 1977), Indian film director and screenwriter known professionally as Vikram Sirikonda
