= Katamarayudu =

2017 film by Kishore Kumar Pardasani

- Theatrical release poster
- Directed by: Kishore Kumar Pardasani
- Screenplay by: Vasu Varma; Deepak Raj; Kishore Kumar Pardasani
- Story by: Siva; Bhupati Raja
- Based on: Veeram (2014)
- Produced by: Sharrath Marar
- Starring: Pawan Kalyan; Shruti Haasan
- Cinematography: Prasad Murella
- Edited by: Gautham Raju
- Music by: Anup Rubens
- Production company: North Star Entertainment
- Release date: 24 March 2017
- Country: India
- Language: Telugu
- Budget: ₹70 crore
- Box office: est. ₹97.5 crore

Katamarayudu is a 2017 Indian Telugu-language action comedy film directed by Kishore Kumar Pardasani. It stars Pawan Kalyan and Shruti Haasan while Tarun Arora, Siva Balaji, Ajay, Ali, Kamal Kamaraju, Chaitanya Krishna, Pradeep Rawat, Rao Ramesh, and Nassar appear in supporting roles. It is a remake of Tamil film Veeram (2014) directed by Siva.

The music was composed by Anup Rubens with cinematography by Prasad Murella and editing by Gautham Raju. The film released worldwide on 24 March 2017. The film was also dubbed in Malayalam under the same title.

== Plot ==
Kattula Katamarayudu, known as Katama, is a brave and selfless man living in the village of Oddaanchatram with his four younger brothers. Katama is deeply devoted to his siblings, often sacrificing his own happiness for their well-being. The brothers are notorious for getting into fights, and their lawyer, Bail Lingam, frequently bails them out of legal trouble. Katama is vehemently opposed to marriage, believing that a wife might create discord among his brothers. Despite promising not to fall in love or marry, his brothers secretly have girlfriends.

The brothers, wanting Katama's approval for their relationships, learn from his childhood friend that Katama once loved a girl named Avantika. They hatch a plan to reintroduce Avantika to Katama, hoping he will fall for her again. However, they discover that Avantika is now married with children. Undeterred, they find another woman named Avantika, believing Katama will fall for her simply because of her name. Initially reluctant, Katama eventually falls in love with the new Avantika.

Katama soon clashes with a businessman named Radia, who controls the village market. Radia tries to kill Katama's brothers, prompting Katama to kidnap Radia's son, Juttu Ranga. After a fierce confrontation, Katama orders Radia to leave the village.

While traveling to Avantika's village, she tells Katama about her family. Her father, Bhupathi, is a respected man who abhors violence, while her brother, a violent man, was killed. Bhupathi refused to bury his son's body, committing himself to peace and harmony in the village. During the journey, goons attack the train, but Katama fights them off, surprising Avantika, who believed he was non-violent.

In Avantika's village, Katama and his brothers, now clean-shaven, are warmly welcomed. Bhupathi is impressed by their love and hospitality. Katama learns that a goon named Yelasari Bhanu, who harbors a grudge against Bhupathi, plans to kill him. Years earlier, Bhupathi had exposed Bhanu's father for causing a factory explosion, leading to his arrest and subsequent suicide. Bhanu seeks revenge against Bhupathi.

Katama discreetly deals with the threats to Bhupathi and his family. However, when Bhupathi's granddaughter finds a sickle under Katama's jeep, Bhupathi orders him to leave. Bhanu, having escaped a death sentence, arrives to kill Bhupathi. Katama hides Bhupathi's family in a safe place, but Bhanu kidnaps Katama's brother, Sivarayudu. Katama arrives just in time to save him but is attacked by Bhanu. Bhupathi and his family witness Katama's bravery as he fights off Bhanu and his men.

An injured Katama rises and brutally kills Bhanu and his henchmen. Impressed by Katama's valor, Bhupathi agrees to let him marry Avantika. The film concludes with the marriages of Katamarayudu and his brothers, bringing joy and unity to their family.

== Cast ==
- Pawan Kalyan as Kattula Katamarayudu
- Shruti Haasan as Avantika
- Tarun Arora as Yelasari Bhanu
- Siva Balaji as Sivarayudu, Katamarayudu's younger brother
- Ajay as Kotangi Kondarayudu / Konda Babu, Katamarayudu's younger brother
- Kamal Kamaraju as Katamarayudu's younger brother
- Chaitanya Krishna as Katamarayudu's youngest brother
- Ali as Kattula Lingarayudu / Linga Babu / Lingam
- Pradeep Rawat as Radia, a businessman
- Rao Ramesh as Narsappa (Money Lender)
- Sanika Raghawa as Urmila
- Nassar as Judge Bhupathi, Avantika's father
- Pavitra Lokesh as Pavitra, Avantika's mother
- Ayyappa P. Sharma as Juttu Ranga
- Mahendran as Machappa, Yelasari Bhanu's father
- Prudhviraj as NASA Sarvam, Avanthika's uncle, Bhupathi's younger brother
- Ravi Prakash as Ravi, Avantika's brother
- Manasa Himavarsha as Manasa
- Sowmya Venugopal as Manju
- Ashmitha Karnani as Alivelu
- Yamini Bhaskar as Yamini
- Bhanu Sri Tripathi
- Temper Vamsi as Contract Killer of Yelasari Bhanu

== Production ==
After the release of his previous film Sardaar Gabbar Singh (2016), Pawan Kalyan announced that he would remake Tamil film Veeram (2014) in Telugu with S. J. Surya as a director, despite the fact that the Tamil film was already dubbed and released in Telugu as Veerudokkade. The title of the film was announced as Katamarayudu named after the song sung by Pawan from the film Attarintiki Daredi (2013). However, in a sudden turn of events, Suryah left the project to concentrate on acting assignments as he was the main villain of the upcoming móvie, Spyder, and he was replaced by Kishore Kumar Pardasani, collaborating with Pawan for the second time after Gopala Gopala (2015) while Soundarrajan, who was the cinematographer, was replaced by Prasad Murella. The film began its shoot on 24 September in Secunderabad.

== Soundtrack ==
Katamarayudu

Soundtrack album by Anup Rubens
- Released: 3 March 2017
- Recorded: 2017
- Genre: Soundtrack
- Length: 24:13
- Label: Aditya Music
- Producer: Anup Rubens

Anup Rubens chronology
Kittu Unnadu Jagratha (2017)	Katamarayudu (2017)	Nene Raju Nene Mantri (2017)

The music was composed by Anup Rubens and released by Aditya Music.

Great Andhra in its review called the music as a total letdown and one of the most disappointing works of Anup and probably one of the weakest albums in Pawan Kalyan's career, if not the weakest. However, Karthik from Milliblog found it "a simple, likeable commercial album by Anup."

Track-List
No.	Title	Lyrics	Singer(s)	Length
1.	"Mira Mira Meesam"	Ramajogayya Sastry	Anurag Kulkarni	4:12
2.	"Laage Laage"	Bhaskarabhatla Ravi Kumar	Nakash Aziz, Nutana Mohan	3:56
3.	"Jivvu Jivvu"	Varikuppala Yadagiri Goud	Dhanunjay Seepana	2:39
4.	"Emo Emo"	Ananta Sriram	Shreya Ghoshal, Armaan Malik	4:16
5.	"Yelo Yedarilo Vaana"	Ananta Sriram	Dhanunjay, Malavika	4:04
6.	"Netha Cheera"	Bhaskarabhatla Ravi Kumar	Sai Charan, Sahithi	4:00
7.	"Love Theme" (Instrumental)			1:06
Total length:				24:13
