= 72 Miles =

72 Miles - Ek Pravas
- Film poster
- Directed by: Rajiv Patil
- Written by: Rajiv Patil
- Story by: Ashok Vhatkar
- Based on: 72 Mile by Ashok Vhatkar
- Produced by: Twinkle Khanna; Ashvini Yardi
- Starring: Chinmay Sant; Smita Tambe
- Edited by: Rajesh Rao
- Music by: Amit Raj
- Production companies: Grazing Goat Pictures Pvt. Ltd; Viacom 18 Motion Pictures
- Release date: August 9, 2013
- Running time: 92 minutes
- Country: India
- Language: Marathi

72 Miles - Ek Pravas is a Marathi film directed by Rajiv Patil produced by Twinkle Khanna and Ashvini Yardi. The film is based on true event mentioned in the 72 Miles Book by Ashok Vhatkar. The film, set in the 50's and 60's, is about journey of a 13-year-old boy who ran away from his hostel and how he matures with time when he meets a sympathetic woman and her children. Deepak Rane was the line producer for this film.

== Plot ==
A young boy, Ashok Vhatkar, decides to escape from his boarding school in Satara. Chased by bullies, robbed by drunken gamblers, he starts his journey towards his village in the Kolhapur district. The very people who seem pleasant and invite him to ride with them turn into horrifying monsters as soon as they learn of his surname, a scheduled caste. Beaten to a pulp by the high-castes, the boy is then rescued by a woman Radhakka, who is on her way to Shigaon in the Walwa taluka of Sangli district with her sick infant son Sundarya and three other children. The journey continues as Ashok moves on with his journey and learns the true sorrows of poverty. In this journey, the infant Sundarya and his brother Ranu lose their lives. This journey of the silent, introvert boy makes him mature and then this boy educates himself and becomes a writer and writes his own story of the journey.

== Cast ==
- Ashok Vhatkar: Chinmay Sant
- Radhakka: Smita Tambe
- Bayji: Shravani Solaskar
- Ranu: Chinmay Kambli
- Bhimi: Esha Mane
- Akshay Kumar: Rajiv Patil

== Soundtrack ==
Songs	Artists	Length
"Bheek"	Prabuddha Lokhande	4:45
"Prarthana"	Anirban Ghosh	4:23
"Raan Bhairi"	Amit Raj	5:15
"Bhiri Bhiri"	Bhavesh Khade	3:33

== Accolades ==
Year	Ceremony	Category	Result	Ref.
2013	56th Maharashtra State Film Award	Maharashtra State Film Award for Best Film	Won	
2013	56th Maharashtra State Film Award	Maharashtra State Film Award for Best Actress	Won	
2013	56th Maharashtra State Film Award	Best Director	Won	
