= Jamai Raja (2014 TV series) =

Indian television series

- Also known as: King of Hearts
- Genre: Soap opera
- Created by: Akshay Kumar; Ashvini Yardi; Devyani Rale
- Developed by: Devyani Rale
- Written by: Abhishek Kumar; Srinita Bhoumick; Pranjal Saxena; Aayush Agrawal
- Directed by: Sangieta Rao; Jackson Sethi; Rohit Diwedi; Jafar Shaikh
- Creative directors: Nisha Boridkar; Niraj Kumar Mishra
- Starring: Nia Sharma; Ravi Dubey; Achint Kaur; Shiny Doshi; Indraneil Sengupta
- Music by: Aashish Rego
- Country of origin: India
- Original language: Hindi
- No. of seasons: 3
- No. of episodes: 701

Production
- Producers: Akshay Kumar; Ashvini Yardi; Meenakshi Sagar
- Running time: 22 minutes
- Production company: Grazing Goat Pictures Pvt. Ltd

Original release
- Network: Zee TV
- Release: 4 August 2014 – 3 March 2017

Jamai Raja (transl. King Son-in-Law) (International title: King of Hearts) is an Indian television drama series, aired on Zee TV from 4 August 2014 to 3 March 2017. It replaced Do Dil Bandhe Ek Dori Se and was replaced by Piyaa Albela in its timeslot. It was produced by actor Akshay Kumar and co-produced by Ashvini Yardi and Meenakshi Sagar. Jamai 2.0 is the sequel to Jamai Raja which streams on ZEE5. It stars Ravi Dubey, Nia Sharma, Shiny Doshi and Achint Kaur in lead roles. It premiered on 10 September 2019.

== Plot ==
=== Season 1 ===
Durga Devi (DD) Patel and her daughter have many misunderstandings, and differences between them. DD is a wealthy jewellery designer. Her daughter, Roshni Patel believes that her mother does not love her and does not give her time, and only loves money. Due to this reason; she hates DD and never behaves well with her. The show starts by showing Roshni getting her kids at the NGO she manages ready for school, and it is shown that it is her birthday. She goes to the airport with her Nani to pick up DD who is returning to India. Meanwhile, DD is shown to be arrogant. On her flight, she is seated next to Siddharth Khurrana; who seeing how arrogant DD is decides to mess with her and act like a middle-class person; who has no manners or etiquette. When DD meets Roshni, she hugs her and tells her that she should have dressed better. She gives Roshni a heap of birthday gifts but does not wish her a happy birthday as she did in the past. Roshni meets Siddharth and he acts like a middle-class man after Roshni starts to hate Siddharth Khurrana without knowing who he is, believing him to be responsible for wanting to demolish her NGO's building via goons, to build his resort.

Siddharth changes his identity in front of Roshni and says that he is a middle-class man named Siddharth Kukreja. He falls in love with her and after a few meetings, she reciprocates. They get married, with even his parents, Raj & Simran, joining in on the lower middle class facade. DD is not in the attendance at the marriage as she does not approve of their relation. After marriage, they start living together in DD's house and Siddharth becomes a "Ghar Jamai" as per DD's terms and conditions. After many episodes, DD finally starts to accept Siddharth as her son-in-law. She trusts him and gives him the power of attorney papers for her property and business to guard and keep safely. Sid's mother Simran's long lost daughter, Kritika, from her previous marriage turns up who has been brought up in bad company. She poison's her mom's mind against Roshni and Sid's ghar jamai status leading to Simran hating DD as she believes that she is ruining Sid's life.

Rajveer, Samaira's husband, has been cheating DD in business during this time and also has an affair with Kritika, prepares fake divorce papers and convinces Simran for his & Kritika's marriage. Simran by this time has lost all her goodness in over-compensating lost years with her daughter. DD decided to get Roshni and Siddharth married again in a grand manner. On the day of both the weddings Sid tries to reveal Rajveer's truth to Simran but she does not believe him. Rajveer fakes getting beat up by DD's goons and, Sid's mother; who had been acting like a middle-class woman, revealed her identity and the fact that she has named all of DD's businesses and property for herself. She did this using the power of attorney papers Sid had with him. DD and Roshni are shattered. Siddharth knows nothing about this and he is not present there. Roshni starts to hate Siddharth, thinking that he was also involved in what Simran (Siddharth's mother) had done. Roshni goes away from him and goes to Bangkok.

==== 6 months later ====
Roshni lives in Bangkok and has become friends with Yash Mehra; who loves her. DD wants them together. Roshni returns to India and meets Sid; who convinces her that he did not have any hand in what happened that he really loves her and that she does too. Roshni is sick and to make her feel better, he tells her to drink some brandy. She doesn't trust him and tells him to drink some to prove that there is no poison in it. He takes a big gulp from the bottle and makes her drink some too. They become drunk and become intimate. The next day, Roshni receives a video where it is perceived that Siddharth is telling Kritika that he will fool Roshni and get her to sleep with him. However, this is not the case, and what Siddarth was saying was part of a game and not about Roshni. Roshni doubts Siddharth and accuses him of raping her. Then Sid becomes angry. He takes Roshni to the family court. The judge gives them three months to save their marriage. Sid and Roshni grow closer.

Meanwhile, Sam is being forced to marry her boss, Baweja; who Rajveer helped to succeed. Roshni goes as a maid to Baweja's house and finds Sam unconscious in a cupboard. Baweja is caught and imprisoned, where he dies. Rajveer kidnaps Roshni. DD reaches and when Rajveer threatens to kill Roshni, DD kills him to save her daughter. Sid's sister, Kritika files a case against DD and withdraws it, leading Sid and everyone else to think that she forgave DD, but when she will take her revenge without Sid's suspicion. Roshni and Sid reunite, and after the end of three months, they decide not to divorce. Sid's mother, Simran tells Sid saying that if he divorces Roshni, she will return DD's property and business. Sid is now compelled to divorce Roshni to restore her former life. He divorces her and Roshni is shattered. Yash falls for Sam and proposes to her, which she accepts. Roshni's biological father (DD's husband) Shiv Patel, returns to the house and has lost his memory. However, he soon regains it, but pretends not to get DD's love.

Sid and Roshni, along with Mona Bua and Shiv, team up to get DD to confess her true feelings to Shiv. She accepts that he is her husband when Sid informs a reporter about Shiv's identity. Meanwhile, Yash finds out about an accident that claimed the life of his sister and brother-in-law. Simran and Kritika plots to separate Roshni and Sid. Kritika tracks down Sid's childhood friend, Misha, and convinces Simran to meet her and marry Sid. One day, Siddharth tells Roshni to make a banana milkshake for him and Misha. She goes and makes the milkshake, but while she is away, Kritika puts mango in Misha's milkshake. Misha is severely allergic to mangoes and can die if she consumes them. She takes a sip of the milkshake and suffers from an allergic reaction. Siddharth believes that Roshni did this on purpose and yells at her. Then Siddharth with the help of Misha, finds out that it was Kritika who put the Mango in the milkshake and is shattered as he blamed Roshni. Misha tells him about the real reason for her coming to India (to marry Sid) he goes and convinces Roshni and apologies to her.

DD and Shiv Patel's problems are solved, and they remarry. On the day of marriage, Roshni learns the truth behind her divorce. She proposes to Sid, and he accepts. Misha's love interest with Neil (fake). Sid, Roshni, Misha and Neil go on a date. They return home when some goons attack them. Sid fights with the goons and is shot. They kidnap Misha and molest her. Misha feigns mental instability to trick Sid into marrying her. In the process, Roshni's father is killed; Misha frames Kritika, but Sid can prove her innocence, and Kritika finally realised her mistake and apologies to Sid. Misha's obsession with Sid's love was exposed, and she is arrested. Roshni tells DD that she is pregnant. DD hides it from everyone and accepts Siddharth's proposal for Roshni. They marry with the truth unveiled.

DD wants special care for Roshni, so she makes her live in her house. Siddharth and family accompany her as they do not want to miss the opportunity to care for Roshni. Roshni and Sid meet a child named Ayesha. They bring Ayesha home upon knowing that Ayesha is lost. She is greeted with happiness by all family members except for DD, NM (Nani Mausi) and Dadi bua. Roshni has a miscarriage while Sid and Ayesha are out. DD blames Sid and Ayesha for this situation and accuses him of murdering his child. Sid and Roshni grieve over the miscarriage. Sid decides to adopt Ayesha. Roshani (initially) opposes it, but later agrees. DD is unhappy with their decision. Later, Ayesha saves DD from the fire, and becomes kind to Ayesha and agrees over the adoption. DD meets Shabnam at her workplace and decides to bring her to her house, listening to her back story.

DD organises a party to introduce Ayesha to everyone. Shabnam threatens to kill Roshni but fails. Shabnam and Ayesha are falsely said to be the daughters of Shiv Patel. DD becomes enraged after hearing the news and plans to kill Shabnam.Siddharth saves Shabnam. He learns how Kritika married Bunty. He is enraged and expels Bua Dadi from the house. Sam gets divorce papers from Yash and everyone; such as Roshni, blames Sid for that. Shabnam drugs Sid and brings him to her room. When Sid wakes up, he finds himself in a bad situation. Shabnam accuses Sid of molestation. Everyone but Roshni loses faith in Siddharth. Shabnam kills Sid and DD is blamed for his murder. Shattered Roshni tries to save her mother from jail, but fails. She meets DD and they both cry over Sid's death. Sid's parents leave.

==== 6 months later ====
Shabnam is controlling DD's house, and Roshni is taking care of Nani and Ayesha. She meets a mechanic named Raghu; who is the exact copy of Sid. She finds him only the way to save her mother and to avenge Siddharth's murder from Shabnam. Raghu helps him like Sid and this against the advice of sumati, his "supposed mother" suffering from mental disorders. With this asset, Roshni follows Raghu during his marriage with Shabnam and thinks that he is Siddharth suffering from amnesia. Raghu acts to be in love with Shabnam as Sid, and takes advantage of this personality to reconcile Sam and Yash. Sid's mother puts up an act of being sick and the truth for Siddharth being Raghu is revealed. Roshni supports Sid and they manage to defeat Shabnam. The day after Shabnam and Raghu's failed marriage, which ended with the arrest of the bride, the Patels and Sid are surprised to see coming to their house a backward Rajasthani family who claims that Roshni married their son Kunal; until she reveals Roshni isn't DD's real girl which turns out to be just blackmail on her part, she leads her and Nani to the wand while Kunal does her better to please Roshni by hiding his violent character. Bansi's daughter and also Kunal's aunt, Shakun falls in love with Sid's father and only belatedly realizes Raj's insincere feelings for her.

Shabnam, who claims to be bipolar to avoid jail, returns to the Patels after saving Roshni from a traffic accident perpetrated by Kunal. She (initially) pretends to be nice, then allies with Bansi to accomplish her revenge against Sid. Later, they drug Roshni, which causes her to lose her memory, telling her that they are her family. Confused, Roshni accepts it, and when Sid and DD reach there, they find themselves in a worse situation. Kunal beats Sid and throws him out of the house. Siddharth comes and saves Roshni from Shabnam and the family by being Jyoti Tai. Shabnam comes again to destroy their lives, but they threw her back again with no returning point. DD plans a trip for Siddharth and Roshni; who are soon accompanied by Yash and Sam to Goa to spend some quality time with each other, which Alex destroys. Sid enters Alex home and finds her dead. The one; who killed Alex and playing the game even going so far as to kidnap Ayesha was Yash. Sid acts for being in the coma and Yash reveals his identity by claiming to have always loved Roshni and to act in the shadows to get her back.

Sid saves Ayesha and tells Roshni about the situation. By the time things get better, Sid sends Ayesha abroad while Shabnam, having falsely reconciled with the Patels earlier to save her sister, definitely accompanies her. Unable to endure his defeat against Siddharth, Yash cheats on DD to kidnap her and then throws her from the hilltop, and Sid fails to save her. DD loses her memory after the incident and remembers Siddharth as Kukreja. Sid tries to bring her memory back while trying to protect her from Amol's evil intentions, Roshni's new suitor chosen expressly by her mother while ignoring welcoming the non-biological brother of her worst enemy. A second time, Yash kidnaps DD after his escape. This time, he ties Roshni from one rope and DD from the other. Sid tries everything to save her but fails. DD dies and Roshni blames Sid for that. She leaves him and everyone thinks that she died..

=== Season 2 ===
==== 2 years later ====
Roshni and Sid have been separated after the death of DD as Roshni thinks DD died because of Sid. Two years have passed since Roshni's presumed death. Siddharth still blames himself for being responsible for the incident and refuses to remarry. On the other hand, Roshni, who turns out to be alive, has forged a whole new identity for herself alongside a good friend, Neil. She calls herself Ragini Desai and acts exactly like DD at the start of the show.

When Sid goes to meet Ragini on business unaware that she is actually Roshni, he crosses paths with and saves a girl called Anya from suicide. It turns out that she is part of the Sengupta family, being herself Neil's sister and Ragini's assistant. Her concern is about her illegitimate pregnancy and the abandonment of her fiancé for whom she had to rebel against his family. In order to convince her not to commit suicide, Siddharth proposes to pretend to be her fiancé and to become the father of her child while waiting to find the person concerned.

As the future son-in-law of the Sengupta family, Siddharth regularly visits Anya, without meeting Ragini/Roshni. Some days later, on Roshni's birthday, Sid and Roshni meet again. Constantly, Roshni seeks to get away from Sid to avoid further trouble while Sid himself is blinded by his love for her. When the link between Sid and Anya becomes known to Roshni, she takes it so badly that in revenge, she asks Neil in marriage, who accepts. According to her, it is only like this that they will manage to forget each other.

So, Roshni is going to marry Neil Sengupta. Misunderstandings soon arise considering Roshni always thinks it would be better for everyone if she and Sid don't meet again, which ends up happening in a twist of fate. These characters, once lovers, both become in-laws. But Neil's conspiracies and his bipolarity issue bring them together again, as Anya takes Siddharth's services for love and seeks for a while to separate her alleged fiancé from her sister-in-law.

Meanwhile, the aunt and the cousin of the Segunta siblings are far from stupid. From the start, they never approved of Neil and Roshni's relationship, for the simple reason that they are secretly working on behalf of Neil's ex-sister-in-law, Payal Walia, who has promised to give them more attention than their family if they were to make her the owner of the premises. This goal being finally achieved with the help of Anya, Roshini and Sid reunite to save this family in distress, and reconcile at the same time. Payal is out against Neil's family and creates a lot of drama in their lives.

Later, as Payal is sent away and released from prison and Neil reconciles with Ria, his lost love, Roshni gives birth to a son who is named Karanveer by Neil. Getting ready to join the Khurranas in London, Sid and Roshni are invited one last time by the Sengupta family where they share a romantic dance. Payal, who planned to take revenge, refrains from learning this sudden departure and now being a changed person. Unfortunately, unable to prevent her revenge which she herself carried out, she just hopes to see them leave as soon as possible.

This is how after moving farewells, Sid, Roshni, Karanveer and her governess, Gangu, experience a road accident perpetrated by an old enemy of the Patel family, Gafur, whom Payal allied with in prison. Everyone predicts that Karanveer Khurana has died with his parents, but the truth was that Satya, the son of Roshni's governess, died, but Gangu makes Karan as Satya. Ria gives birth to a daughter who was named Mahi by Sid on the day he died with Roshni. Ria dies after Mahi's birth.

=== Season 3 ===
==== 20 years later ====
Things have changed after the death of Sid and Roshni. Karanveer "Karan" Khurana, Sid and Roshni's son, has grown up. Gangu named him Satya as her deceased son (that's what she believed), raised him and taught him good values despite his innate street boy character. Neil and Ria are dead too. Their child, Mahi Sengupta is taken care of by Payal who changed her surname from Walia to Sengupta. Mahi and Karan's relationship is like Roshni and Sid. But unlike DD Patel who loved her daughter, Payal hates Mahi for her parents' mistakes. By making her brother-in-law her husband, she thought of taking back the property that the Sengupta stole from her. Then finally, she adapted to passing herself off as a nice mother in the eyes of her niece, because this one turns out to be the true heiress.

When Satya comes into Mahi's life, it is Mahi's half-sister, Koyal, who interests him. But Sid's prediction about his son's future had an effect. Satya has fallen in love with Mahi, but Mahi does not immediately realize her feelings for him. Knowing Payal's malicious intentions towards his daughter-in-law, Satya vowed to protect her.

With the help of a friend who will turn against him, he will succeed in bringing down Payal's mask. But she comes back into their lives, still pretending to be a good person. It later turns out that she is in contact with Kritika and is blackmailing her to see her nephew again. Thus, after a series of attempts to repossess Sengupta property that will lead to the revelation of Satya's real identity, Payal is still exposed and goes back to prison while Kritika brings Mahi and Karanveer (Satya) back to the Khurannas.

Along the way, they meet and take in a weirdo who turns out to be an exact copy of an old family acquaintance. It is in fact Kareena, Shabnam's daughter. She also comes back to take revenge for her mother knowing that she took her model just like Karanveer took her father's.

Several attempts by Kareena would later involve the return of a more loving Payal. When Mahi is expecting twins, everyone will be happy. Payal, who has made herself accepted in the family, tries to keep Kareena away from Mahi. At the end of the show, Kareena will be hit by a car after yet another attempt while Mahi, Satya and the entire Khurana family welcome the newborns to the maternity ward.

== Cast ==
=== Main ===
- Ravi Dubey as double role
  - Siddharth (Sid) Khurana: Raj and Simran's son; Kritika's half-brother; Roshni's husband; Ayesha's adoptive father; Karanvir's father (2014-2016)
  - Karanvir "Karan" Khurana / Satya Sawant: Siddharth and Roshni's son; Gangu's adoptive son; Koel's former love interest; Mahi's husband; (2016-2017)
- Nia Sharma as Roshni Patel Khurana: Shiv and Durga's daughter; Samaira's cousin; Shabnam and Ayesha's half-sister; Siddharth's wife; Ayesha's adoptive mother; Karanvir's mother; Kareena's aunt (2014-2016)
- Achint Kaur as Durga Devi (DD) Patel: Shiv's wife; Roshni and Rohan's mother; Shabnam's step-mother; Ayesha's stepmother and adoptive grandmother; Karanvir's grandmother; (2014–2016)
- Shiny Doshi as Mahi Sengupta Khurana: Neil and Ria's daughter; Payal's niece and step-daughter; Koel and Shyom's half-sister; Dhawal's ex-fiancée; Karanvir's wife (2016-2017)
- Mouli Ganguly as Payal Walia Sengupta: Ria's elder sister; Neil's second wife and widow; Mahi's aunt and step-mother; Koel and Shyom's mother (2016–2017)

=== Recurring ===
- Sanjay Swaraj as Raj Khurana; Simran's widower; Siddharth's father, Kritika's step-father; Ayesha's adopted grandfather; Karanvir's grandfather (2014–2017)
- Shruti Ulfat as Simran Khurana; Raj's wife; Siddharth and Kritika's mother; Ayesha's adoptive grandmother; Karanvir's grandmother (2014–2016)
- Isha Sharma/Varsha Usgaonkar as Kritika Khurana; Rajveer's widow; Bunty's wife; Aryan's mother; Simran's daughter; Raj's step-daughter; Siddharth's half-sister; Karanvir's aunt (2014–2017)

==== Season 1 ====
- Apara Mehta as Alaknanda (Nani Maa): Durga's mother; Roshni's grandmother (2014–2016)
- KC Shankar as Shiv Patel: Durga's husband; Mona, Kesar and Babloo's brother; Roshni, Rohan, Ayesha and Shabnam's father; Karanvir and Kareena's grandfather (2015) (Dead)
- Aaryaa Sharma as Mona Patel: Samaira's mother; Shiv's sister; Roshni, Rohan, Ayesha and Shabnam's aunt (2014–2016)
- Reyhna Malhotra as Samaira Patel: Mona's daughter; Rajveer's ex-wife; Yash's wife; Roshni, Rohan, Ayesha and Shabnam's cousin (2014–2016)
- Darpan Shrivastava as Kesar Patel: Shiv, Mona and Babloo's brother; Resham's husband; Roshni, Rohan, Samaira, Ayesha and Shabnam's Uncle (2014–2016)
- Delnaaz Irani/Tanaaz Irani as Resham Patel: Kesar's wife (2014–2016)
- Gautam Sharma as Babloo Patel: Rohan, Roshni, Samaira, Ayesha and Shabnam's Uncle; Pratima's husband (2014)
- Amrin Chakkiwala as Pratima Patel: Babloo's wife (2014)
- Delissa Mehra as Ayesha Patel: Shiv's daughter; Durga's stepdaughter and adoptive granddaughter; Roshni's half-sister; Roshni and Siddharth's adoptive daughter; Shabnam's sister; Samaira's cousin and adoptive niece (2016)
- Shagun Ajmani as
  - Shabnam Patel: Shiv's daughter; Ayesha's sister; Rohan and Roshni's half-sister; Siddharth's one-sided obsessive lover; Kareena's mother(2015)
  - Kareena Patel (Season 3): Shabnam's daughter; Karan's one-sided obsessive lover (2017)
- Vishal Karwal as Rajveer Singh Ranawat: Samaira's ex-husband; Kritika's first husband (2014–2015)
- Mohit Malhotra as Yash Mehra/Joker: Roshni's former fiancée and one sided obsessive lover; Samaira's second husband (2015–2016)
- Sumit Verma as Bunty Khanna: Anupama's son; Kritika's second husband; Aryan's father (2015–16)
- Sumona Chakravarti as Misha Grewal: Siddharth's friend and one sided obsessive lover; Shiv's killer; Neil's former fiancée (2015)
- Sushma Prashant as Sukhi (Beeji) (2014–2016)
- Poonam Mathur as Bua Daadi (2015)
- Preeti Kochar as Naani Masi (2015)
- Sandit Tiwari as Prashant Kulkarni: Siddharth's friend and colleague (2014)
- Ujjwal Gauraha as Siddharth's friend and business manager (2014)
- Sanchita Banerjee as Jigna
- Savant Singh Premi as Pintu Pandey (2015–16)
- Adhvik Mahajan as Kunal (2015–2016)
- Gopi Desai as Bansiben (2015–2016)
- Hitesh Rawal as Premal (2015–2016)
- Kiran Srinivas as Amol Mehra/Sonu Raj: Yash's brother (2016)
- Samir Harhash as Ram Chatturvedi (2014–16)

==== Season 2 ====
- Indraneil Sengupta as Neil Sengupta: Naina's elder son; Anya's brother; Ragini's (Roshni) namesake-husband; Ria's widower; Payal's husband; Mahi, Koel and Shyom's father (2016)(Dead)
- Sonal Minocha/Anaya Soni as Ria Walia Sengupta: Payal's younger sister; Neil's first wife; Mahi's mother (2016)/(2016)(Dead)
- Seema Pandey/Kulbir Baderson as Naina Sengupta (Dida): Neil and Anya's mother; Mahi, Koel and Shyom's grandmother (2016–2017)/(2017)
- Rajeshwari Datta as Mitul Sengupta: Ranjit's mother (2016–2017)
- Sunny Arora as Ranjit Sengupta: Neil and Anya's cousin; Mitul's son (2016)
- Aalisha Panwar as Anya Sengupta: Naina's daughter; Neil's sister; Siddharth's ex-fiancee; Mahi, Shyom and Keol's aunt (2016)

==== Season 3 ====
- Asawari Joshi as Gangu Sawant: Krishna's widow; Roshni's caretaker; Satya's mother; Karanvir, Kajal and Sunil's adoptive mother (2016–2017)
- Karan Singhmar as Sunil Sawant: Gangu's adoptive son; Satya, Karanvir and Kajal's adoptive brother (2016–2017)
- Pranitaa Pandit as Kajal Sawant: Gangu's adoptive daughter; Karanvir and Sunil's adoptive sister; Satya's ex-fiancée (2016–2017)
- Prashant Chawla as Satya Sawant (Real)/Dhruv Raizada (fake): Gangu and Krishna's son; Karanvir and Sunil's adoptive brother; Kajal's ex-fiancée; Mahi's one-sided obsessive lover; Sunaina's husband (2017) (Dead)
- Orvana Ghai as Koel Sengupta: Neil and Payal's daughter; Shyom's sister; Mahi's half-sister; Karanvir's former love interest (2017)
- Rudraksh Thakur as Shyom Sengupta: Neil and Payal's son; Koel's brother; Mahi's half-brother (2017)
- Sara Khan as Aleena Verma/Mahi Sawant (fake): Karanvir's friend turned one-sided obsessive lover (2016–17)
- Vikram Sakhalkar as Dhawal: Mahi's ex-fiancee (2016–2017)
- Neelu Kohli as Anupama Khanna: Bunty's mother; Kritika's mother-in-law; Aryan's grandmother (2017)
- Kushabh Manghani as Deepu (2016)

== Guest ==
- Jasmin Bhasin as Twinkle
- Sidhant Gupta as Kunj
- Zain Imam as Yuvraj
- Asha Negi as herself
- Drashti Dhami as Gayatri
- Shabir Ahluwalia as Abhi
- Sriti Jha as Pragya
- Karan Patel as Raman
- Divyanka Tripathi as Ishita
- Shikha Singh as Aaliya
- Karan Veer Mehra as Naren
- Ankita Lokhande as Ankita
- Shakti Arora as Ranveer
- Radhika Madan as Ishani
- Dheeraj Dhoopar as Prem
- Dipika Kakar as Simar
- Manish Raisinghan as Siddhant
- Avika Gor as Roli
- Ronit Roy as Nachiket
- Pallavi Kulkarni as Ragini
- Ravish Desai as Vihaan
- Mugdha Chaphekar as Aarushi
- Karanvir Bohra as Aahil
- Surbhi Jyoti as Sanam
- Disha Parmar as Jhanvi
- Ahmad Harhash as Balan Sengupta (2016)

== Awards ==
Year	Award	Category	Nominee	Result
2014	Zee Rishtey Awards	Favourite Saas Jamai Rishta	Ravi Dubey & Achint Kaur	Won
2014	Zee Rishtey Awards	Favourite Saas Bahu Rishta	Nia Sharma & Shruti Ulfat	Won
2014	Zee Rishtey Awards	Favourite Saas	Achint Kaur	Won
2014	Zee Rishtey Awards	Favourite Nayi Jodi	Ravi Dubey & Nia Sharma	Won
2014	Zee Rishtey Awards	Favourite Naya Sadasya - Male	Ravi Dubey	Nominated
2014	Zee Rishtey Awards	Favourite Naya Sadasya - Female	Nia Sharma	Nominated
2014	Zee Rishtey Awards	Favourite Popular Face (Male)	Ravi Dubey	Nominated
2014	Zee Rishtey Awards	Favourite Jodi	Ravi Dubey & Nia Sharma	Nominated
2014	Zee Rishtey Awards	Favourite Popular Face - Female	Nia Sharma	Nominated
2014	Zee Rishtey Awards	Favourite Beti	Nia Sharma	Nominated
2014	Zee Rishtey Awards	Favourite Parivaar	Ashvini Yardi/Meenakshi Sagar	Nominated
2014	Zee Rishtey Awards	Favourite Beta	Ravi Dubey	Nominated
2014	Zee Rishtey Awards	Favourite Saas-Sasur	Shruti Ulfat & Sanjay Swaraj	Nominated
2014	Zee Rishtey Awards	Favourite Mata-Pita Rishta	Shruti Ulfat & Sanjay Swaraj	Nominated
2014	Zee Rishtey Awards	Favourite Dosti	Ravi Dubey & Sandit Tiwari	Nominated
2014	Zee Rishtey Awards	Favourite Dharavahik - Fiction	Grazing Goat Pictures	Nominated
2014	Indian Television Academy Awards	GR8! ON-Screen Couple Of The Year	Ravi Dubey & Nia Sharma	Nominated
2015	Zee Rishtey Awards	Favourite Zee Personality of the Year	Achint Kaur	Won
2015	Zee Rishtey Awards	Favourite Kutumbh	Ashvini Yardi/Meenakshi Sagar	Won
2015	Zee Rishtey Awards	Favourite Bhai	Ravi Dubey	Won
2015	Zee Rishtey Awards	Favourite Sautan	Shagun Ajmani	Won
2015	Zee Rishtey Awards	Favourite Stylish Personality of the Year	Achint Kaur	Won
2015	Zee Rishtey Awards	Favourite Beti	Nia Sharma	Nominated
2015	Zee Rishtey Awards	Favourite Beta	Ravi Dubey	Nominated
2015	Zee Rishtey Awards	Favourite Pati-Patni Rishta	Ravi Dubey & Nia Sharma	Nominated
2015	Zee Rishtey Awards	Favourite Buzurg	Apara Mehta	Nominated
2015	Television Style Awards	Most Stylish Beti	Nia Sharma	Won
2015	Indian Telly Awards	Best Onscreen Couple	Ravi Dubey & Nia Sharma	Nominated
2015	Indian Telly Awards	Best Actor in Leading Role	Ravi Dubey	Nominated
2015	Indian Telly Awards	Best Actress in Supporting Role	Achint Kaur	Nominated
2015	Zee Gold Awards	Best Actor - Female	Nia Sharma	Nominated
2015	Zee Gold Awards	Best Actor - Male	Ravi Dubey	Nominated
2015	Zee Gold Awards	Most Popular Jodi on Television	Ravi Dubey & Nia Sharma	Nominated
2015	Zee Gold Awards	Best Supporting Actor - Male	Sanjay Swaraj	Nominated
2015	Zee Gold Awards	Best Supporting Actor - Female	Apara Mehta	Nominated

== Adaptations ==
Language	Title	Original release	Network(s)	Last aired	Notes
Hindi	Jamai Raja जमाई राजा	4 August 2014	Zee TV	3 March 2017	Original
Bengali	Jamai Raja জামাই রাজা	5 June 2017	Zee Bangla	12 August 2018	Remake
Punjabi	Jawai Ji ਜਵਾਈ ਜੀ	28 October 2024	Zee Punjabi	31 May 2025	Remake

== Reboot ==
In June 2017, a spin-off titled Jamai 2.0 debuted on ZEE5 with cast members Ravi Dubey, Nia Sharma, and Achint Kaur reprising their roles. Ravi Dubey, Nia Sharma and Achint Kaur are shooting for Jamai 2.0 season 2.
