= Shagun Ajmani =

Indian television actress and model

- Born: Garima Ajmani; 8 December 1985 (age 40); Mumbai, Maharashtra, India
- Occupation: Actress
- Years active: 2006 - Present
- Height: 1.61 m (5 ft 3 in)

Garima Ajmani, now called Shagun Ajmani, is an Indian television actress and model. She made her television debut on Sahara One's show Zaara (TV series) where she played the role of Shirin. She is best known for playing Shabnam, a negative role on the hit series Jamai Raja (2014 TV series). Ajmani reportedly left the series over concerns about her character's future direction. She is also known for her role of Koki in fir.

== Television ==
Year	Serial	Character	Network
2006–2008	F.I.R.	Constable Kokila "Koki" Shah	Sab TV
2006–2008	Zaara	Shirin	Sahara One
2009–2011	Jhansi Ki Rani	Moti Bai	Zee TV
2010–2011	Apno Ke Liye Geeta Ka Dharmayudh	Kamya Yadav	Zee TV
2015–2017	Jamai Raja	Shabnam Patel/Kareena Patel	Zee TV
2017	Naagin 2	Tanya	Colors TV
