= Touch Chesi Chudu =

- Theatrical release poster
- Directed by: Vikram Sirikonda
- Written by: Screenplay: Vikram Sirikonda; Story: Vakkantham Vamsi; Dialogues: Deepak Raj
- Produced by: Nallamalupu Srinivas (Bujji); Vallabhaneni Vamsi
- Starring: Ravi Teja; Raashii Khanna; Seerat Kapoor; Freddy Daruwala
- Cinematography: Chota K. Naidu
- Edited by: Gautham Raju
- Music by: Songs: JAM8; Background Score: Mani Sharma
- Production company: Sri Lakshmi Narasimha Productions
- Release date: 2 February 2018
- Running time: 140 minutes
- Country: India
- Language: Telugu
- Box office: ₹19 crore

Touch Chesi Chudu (transl. Touch and See) is a 2018 Indian Telugu-language action comedy film co-written and directed by Vikram Sirikonda in his directorial debut in Telugu cinema and story by Vakkantham Vamsi. It features Ravi Teja, Raashii Khanna and Seerat Kapoor in the lead roles while Freddy Daruwala plays the main antagonist, which marks his debut in Telugu cinema. Pre-production of the film began in July 2016 and principal photography commenced in February 2017 in Hyderabad. The film was released worldwide on 2 February 2018.

== Plot ==
Karthikeya is a successful businessman and owner of Kartikeya Industries in Pondicherry. He deeply values his family and believes that "family is the most important thing." Despite his peaceful life, he faces trouble from a local goon, Selvam, who frequently steals his machinery. Frustrated by the police’s inaction, Karthik boldly claims he can solve the case in two minutes. Amused, the CI lets him take charge for a day to handle Selvam. Meanwhile, Karthik falls for a choreographer, Pushpa, after a series of playful encounters.

One night, a student activist is murdered at a pub by a notorious gangster, Irfan Lala. Karthik’s sister secretly witnesses the crime and informs him. When Karthik reports this to the police, he is shocked to learn that Irfan was supposedly dead. However, he later spots Irfan alive and starts investigating, leading to the revelation of his hidden past.

Past: Karthik was once a fierce, duty-driven police officer in Hyderabad, known for his aggressive and reckless methods. He was transferred from Kadapa and soon became a nightmare for criminals. In one mission, he successfully rescues the police commissioner's kidnapped daughter. Irfan Lala, along with his father Rauf Lala, aims to win a by-election and dominate the area. When Irfan attempts to stop the Chief Minister’s rally, Karthik strategically ensures its success, leading to Irfan's political downfall. Meanwhile, Divya, who deeply loves Karthik, gets engaged to him, but he breaks it off due to his commitment to duty, leaving her heartbroken. Irfan later murders a student named Shalini during an altercation at a party. Her mother, who was once Karthik's teacher, goes on a hunger strike demanding justice. Moved by this, Karthik vows to punish Irfan. In a dramatic shootout, Karthik critically injures Irfan but also gets wounded. While recovering in the hospital, Karthik frantically searches for Irfan. His father and the commissioner mislead him into believing that Irfan is dead, hoping to bring him closer to his family.

Present: Realizing the importance of balancing his professional and personal life, Karthik eventually tracks down and kills Irfan in a composed manner. Upon hearing this, Rauf Lala dies of shock. In the end, Karthik reunites with Pushpa and asks for her forgiveness. They embrace, signifying his newfound balance between duty and family.

== Cast ==
- Ravi Teja as ACP Karthikeya / Karthik
- Raashii Khanna as Pushpa
- Seerat Kapoor as Divya
- Freddy Daruwala as Irfan Lala
- Jayaprakash as Karthikeya's father
- Sriranjani as Karthikeya's mother
- Murali Sharma as Police Commissioner
- Vineet Kumar as Home Minister Keshava Prasad
- Pooja Jhaveri as Sandhya
- Shahbaz Khan as Rauf Lala
- Sayaji Shinde as DGP Ramachandra Rao
- Vennela Kishore as Circle Inspector J. Balram
- Aadukalam Naren as C. I. M. Murugesan
- Ajay as Police Officer
- Kaumudi Nemani as Shalini
- Suhasini Maniratnam as Kartikeya's teacher and Shalini's mother
- Raghu Babu as Raghu, Karthik's father
- Annapurna as Karthikeya's grandmother
- Vijayakumar as Chief Minister
- Satyam Rajesh as Rajesh, Karthikeya's friend
- Kireeti Damaraju as Shalini's friend
- Satya as Constable
- Duvvasi Mohan as Constable
- Jeeva as Maulana
- Vajja Venkata Giridhar as Mallesh Yadav
- Gundu Sudarshan as Car Owner
- Sritej as Satyadev
- Charandeep as Kidnapper
- Appaji Ambarisha Darbha as Muslim Politician
- Rajitha
- Ananth as Doctor
- Sandhya Janak
- Vaishnavi Chaitanya as Karthikeya's second sister
- Anitha Nath
- Vettai Muthukumar as Selvam
- Pondy Ravi as Navy officer

== Production ==
=== Development ===
Pre-production of this film began in July 2016 after the script approval from Ravi Teja to Vikram Sirikonda. Raashii Khanna who earlier worked with Teja in Bengal Tiger (2015) was signed in as one of the female lead in September 2016.

Pritam was roped in for the music which makes his debut in Telugu cinema. Bollywood actor Freddy Daruwala was signed in to play as the main antagonist in April 2017 which marks his debut in Telugu films. Seerat Kapoor was signed in as the second female lead in early May 2017 after considering Lavanya Tripathi and Pragya Jaiswal for that role.

The title and the posters were revealed on 26 January 2017, marking Ravi Teja's birthday. The film was officially launched on 3 February 2017.

=== Story and filming ===
Principal photography began on 3 February 2017 in Hyderabad.

== Soundtrack ==
Touch Chesi Chudu

Soundtrack album by JAM8
- Released: Jan 27, 2018
- Recorded: 2018
- Genre: Soundtrack
- Length: 20:34
- Label: Mango Music
- Producer: JAM8

Touch Chesi Chudu's soundtrack is composed by JAM8 (Apprentice band of Pritam).

Track list
No.	Title	Lyrics	Music	Singer(s)	Length
1.	"Touch Chesi Chudu Title Song"	Chandrabose	Marc D Muse for JAM8	Brijesh Shandilya, Sreerama Chandra	04.30
2.	"Raaye Raaye"	Kasarla Shyam	Marc D Muse for JAM8	Nakash Aziz, Madhu Priya	03.30
3.	"Manasa"	Rehman	Kaushik-Akash-Guddu (KAG) for JAM8	Benny Dayal, Neeti Mohan	04.30
4.	"Rang Barse"	Rehman	Kaushik-Akash-Guddu (KAG) for JAM8	Akashdeep Sengupta	4.04
5.	"Pushpa"	Rehman	Ashish Pandit for JAM8	Nakash Aziz, Dj Smash Guy	04.00
Total length:					20:34

== Reception ==
On the review aggregator website Rotten Tomatoes, 0% of 5 critics' reviews are positive, with an average rating of 4/10.

A critic from The Times Of India stated that " If you're a Ravi Teja fan, or have seen enough of his movies, then you pretty much know what to expect. Good humour, punch dialogues (delivered in his inimitable style) and action-packed storyline had earned him the title "Mass Maharaja", and brought him some of his biggest hits. In Vikram Sirikonda's "Touch Chesi Chudu", Ravi Teja is meaner and leaner than he ever was, but the script lacks any of the attributes that made him a successful star in the first place. With a shoddy screenplay and an unimaginative storyline, "Touch Chesi Chudu" is a cumbersome watch".
