= Singh Is Bliing =

2015 Indian film by Prabhu Deva

- Theatrical release poster
- Directed by: Prabhu Deva
- Written by: Chintan Gandhi
- Produced by: Ashvini Yardi
- Starring: Akshay Kumar; Amy Jackson; Lara Dutta; Kay Kay Menon; Kunal Kapoor; Arfi Lamba
- Cinematography: Dudley
- Edited by: Steven Bernard
- Music by: Songs: Meet Bros Anjjan; Manj Musik; Sajid–Wajid; Sneha Khanwalkar; Background Score: Sandeep Shirodkar
- Production companies: Pen Studios; Grazing Goat Pictures
- Distributed by: Reliance Entertainment; PVR Pictures; Eros International
- Release date: 2 October 2015
- Running time: 139 minutes
- Country: India
- Language: Hindi
- Budget: ₹70 crore
- Box office: est. ₹149.10 crore

Singh Is Bliing is a 2015 Indian Hindi-language action comedy film directed by Prabhu Deva and produced by Ashvini Yardi under Grazing Goat Pictures, which provided the story and screenplay. The film stars Akshay Kumar, Amy Jackson, Lara Dutta and Kay Kay Menon. It is a quasi-sequel to the 2008 film Singh Is Kinng. The film was alleged to be plagiarized from My Wife Is a Gangster 3.

Singh Is Bliing was released in global cinemas on 2 October 2015, coinciding with Gandhi Jayanti, to mixed reviews from critics. Despite receiving mixed to negative reviews, the film became managed to recover its budget and more at the box office by grossing over ₹135 crores worldwide against a budget of ₹70 crores, with critics praising Kumar's performance. It was one of the highest grossers of the year.

== Plot ==
Raftaar Singh is a nice and fun-loving but uneducated man, with a mischievous and humorous character. He is thrown out of his home by his father who gives him an ultimatum: if he wants to come back, he must get into business with Kirpal Singh in Goa or marry a woman called Sweetie whom he doesn't like. Raftaar chooses the former. Meanwhile, Sara Rana is shown living in Romania with her father, who made bad choices and works for the mafia. Mark, a mafia boss, wants to marry Sara but is rejected by Sara and her father, and shoots Mr Rana in anger. Sara manages to escape to Goa where she hopes to find her estranged mother.

Raftaar meets Kirpal Singh and lies about speaking English in order to get a job taking care of Sara while she is in India. Raftaar and his friends meet Sara at the airport; finding that Sara does not understand Hindi, Raftaar hires a translator, Emily. Sara meets Kirpal and feels safe but presumes Raftaar to be a bad guy. Sara's opinion changes when she sees Raftaar helping a woman who was bothered by a bunch of goons. When these goons later come after Raftaar, they are beaten-up by Sara. Emily is shocked to see that Sara can fight, but Sara warns Emily not to reveal about the incident to Raftaar.

Raftaar's friends and Sara are kidnapped by the same goons; Raftaar tries to save them but gets badly beaten. Sara later fights all the goons away and begins to fall for Raftaar. Kirpal feels happy with Raftaar's performance and soon becomes a successful businessman with his help. Mark learns that Sara is in Goa and sends his men to bring her back. Raftaar and Sara try to flee but their car is hit and Raftaar is beaten-up the boss. He later fights them all except for a woman who is beaten-up by Sara. On Kripal's advice, Raftaar takes Sara to his family home in Punjab.

Sara meets Raftaar's parents, and seeing Raftaar with them she reminisces of her childhood and cheers-up. Raftaar's father asks Sara about her relationship with Raftaar, and she reveals that she is in love with him. Earlier, Emily had handed responsibility to Raftaar to find Sara's lost mother, and they return to Goa where Sara sees her mother with a child, thinking her mother had a second marriage and is happily living her life. Sara decides to go back to Romania, saying she would never return. Raftaar feels heartbroken seeing her leave.

In Romania, Sara finds her father recovering in hospital. Raftaar finds Sara's mother and brings her to Romania, reuniting the family, and Sara confesses her love to Raftaar. Raftaar decides to marry Sara, telling his family and purchasing a cake, flowers and new clothes. He goes to church but is angered when he finds Sara about to marry Mark. Sara refuses to marry Mark, who challenges Raftaar to a fight. Raftaar manages to beat Mark and his men but is shot. Sara is worried that Raftaar may die, but he wakes after remembering the lessons taught by his father and resumes the fight with Mark. Raftaar is able to beat the mafia and Mark, who dies after saying "You're too good, sardaar" (transl. 'chieftain' or 'leader'), with Raftaar left hanging by the side of a bridge. Sara and Raftaar confirm their love for each other, and Raftaar is saved and returns to Punjab to celebrate his happiness with his friends, family, and Sara. The film ends with Raftaar and Sara performing a song together.

== Cast ==
- Akshay Kumar as Raftaar Singh
- Amy Jackson as Sara Rana
- Kay Kay Menon as Mark
- Lara Dutta as Emily
- Pradeep Rawat as Kirpal Singh
- Anil Mange as Munawar aka Pompy
- Arfi Lamba as Kishu aka Pampy
- Rati Agnihotri as Harpreet Kaur, Raftaar's mother
- Yograj Singh as Raftaar's father
- Kunal Kapoor as Mr. Rana, Sara's Father
- Gurpreet Ghuggi as Mayor
- Karamjit Anmol as Raftaar's friend in zoo
- B. N. Sharma as Host of event at zoo
- Ali Haidar as the airline passenger (special appearance)
- Prabhu Deva in a cameo appearance as a man in the washroom and in the song "Singh and Kaur"
- Sunny Leone in a cameo appearance as a woman who Raftaar mistakes for Sara in the airport

== Production ==
=== Development ===
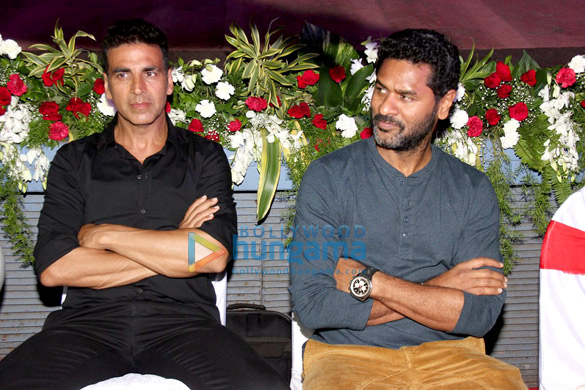
Filmmaker Prabhu Deva and actor Akshay Kumar at the film's screening

In early 2014, it was announced that actor Akshay Kumar and director Prabhu Deva would be reuniting for another film after their previous blockbuster, Rowdy Rathore. Soon after, it was confirmed that the film would be titled 'Singh Is Bliing' and was to be produced by Grazing Goat Pictures. Kumar had also shot some scenes with a lion.

Kumar made it clear that the film was not a sequel to his 2008 film Singh Is Kinng.

=== Casting ===
After Akshay Kumar was signed for the lead role, Kareena Kapoor was replaced by Kriti Sanon for the female lead. After training for the role, Sanon opted out of the film and was replaced by Amy Jackson.

Lara Dutta, who was last seen in the 2013 film David, made a comeback with Singh Is Bling.

It was reported that actor Vivek Oberoi would play the negative role in the film, but he was replaced by Kay Kay Menon as the main antagonist, Mark.

Actor Kunal Kapoor, who was last in the 1985 film Trikal, was signed to play Sara Rana's father.

=== Filming ===
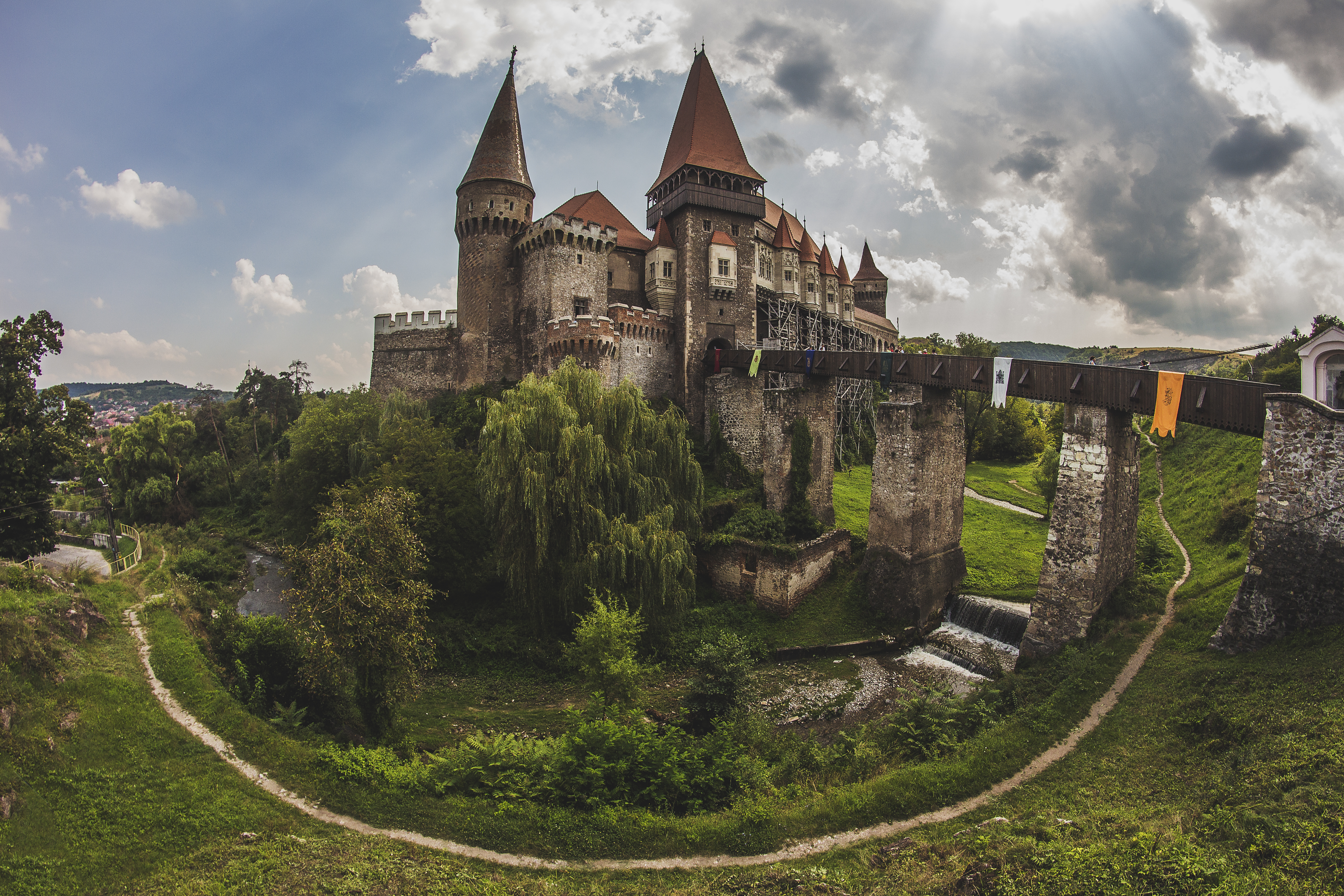
Final portions of the film were shot in Romania's Hunedoara Castle.

Principal photography started in early April 2015. Kumar posted a photo on Twitter stating the film's first day shoot. The film started its first day shoot in Patiala. Portions of the film were reportedly shot in Goa in early May 2015. The final portion of the film including the climax was reportedly shot in Romania's Hunedoara Castle in the first week of July.

== Soundtrack ==
Singh Is Bliing

Soundtrack album by Sneha Khanwalkar, Manj Musik, Sajid–Wajid and Meet Bros
- Released: 28 August 2015
- Recorded: 2015
- Genre: Feature film soundtrack
- Length: 30:46
- Language: Hindi
- Label: Zee Music Company
- Producer: Dhaval Gada

The soundtrack album of Singh is Bliing consists of eight songs with an unplugged versions and two remix versions. Sneha Khanwalkar composed only one song titled "Tung Tung Baaje", Sajid–Wajid composed one song titled "Cinema Dekhe Mamma" and Meet Bros also composed one song "Dil Kare Chu Che". Manj Musik composed two tracks "Singh And Kaur", "Mahi Aaja", the remix versions of the two tracks he composed and an unplugged version of the song "Mahi Aaja". Sandeep Shirodkar composed the film score. The lyrics were penned by Sneha Khanwalkar, Manj Musik, Nindy Kaur, Raftaar, Big Dhillon, Wajid, Irfan Kamal and Kumaar. A single from the film "Tung Tung Baaje" was launched digitally on 12 August 2015, and was premiered with another Akshay Kumar-starrer Brothers on 14 August 2015, which is something new for a Bollywood film. The full album was released on 28 August 2015, and received positive reviews from critics. Popular music website Glamsham rated the album 3.5 out of 5 stars and stated that "The album does manage to live up to its expectations" and chose "Tung Tung Baaje", "Singh And Kaur" and "Maahi Aaja" as their picks.

No.	Title	Lyrics	Music	Singer(s)	Length
1.	"Tung Tung Baje"	Sneha Khanwalkar	Sneha Khanwalkar	Diljit Dosanjh, Nooran Sisters	04:43
2.	"Singh And Kaur"	Manj Musik, Nindy Kaur, Raftaar, Big Dhillon	Manj Musik	Manj Musik, Nindy Kaur, Raftaar	03:30
3.	"Cinema Dekhe Mamma"	Wajid, Irfan Kamal	Sajid–Wajid	Wajid, Shaan, Ritu Pathak	04:09
4.	"Mahi Aaja"	Manj Musik	Manj Musik	Manj Musik, Shashaa Tirupati	03:20
5.	"Dil Kare Chu Che"	Kumaar	Meet Bros	Labh Janjua, Anusha Dandekar, Meet Bros	03:59
6.	"Mahi Aaja" (Unplugged)	Manj Musik	Manj Musik	Arijit Singh	03:39
7.	"Singh And Kaur" (Remix)	Manj Musik	Manj Musik	Manj Musik, Nindy Kaur	03:37
8.	"Mahi Aaja" (Remix)	Manj Musik	Manj Musik	Manj Musik, Shashaa Tirupati	03:50
Total length:					30:46

== Release ==
=== Objections by Sikh clergy ===
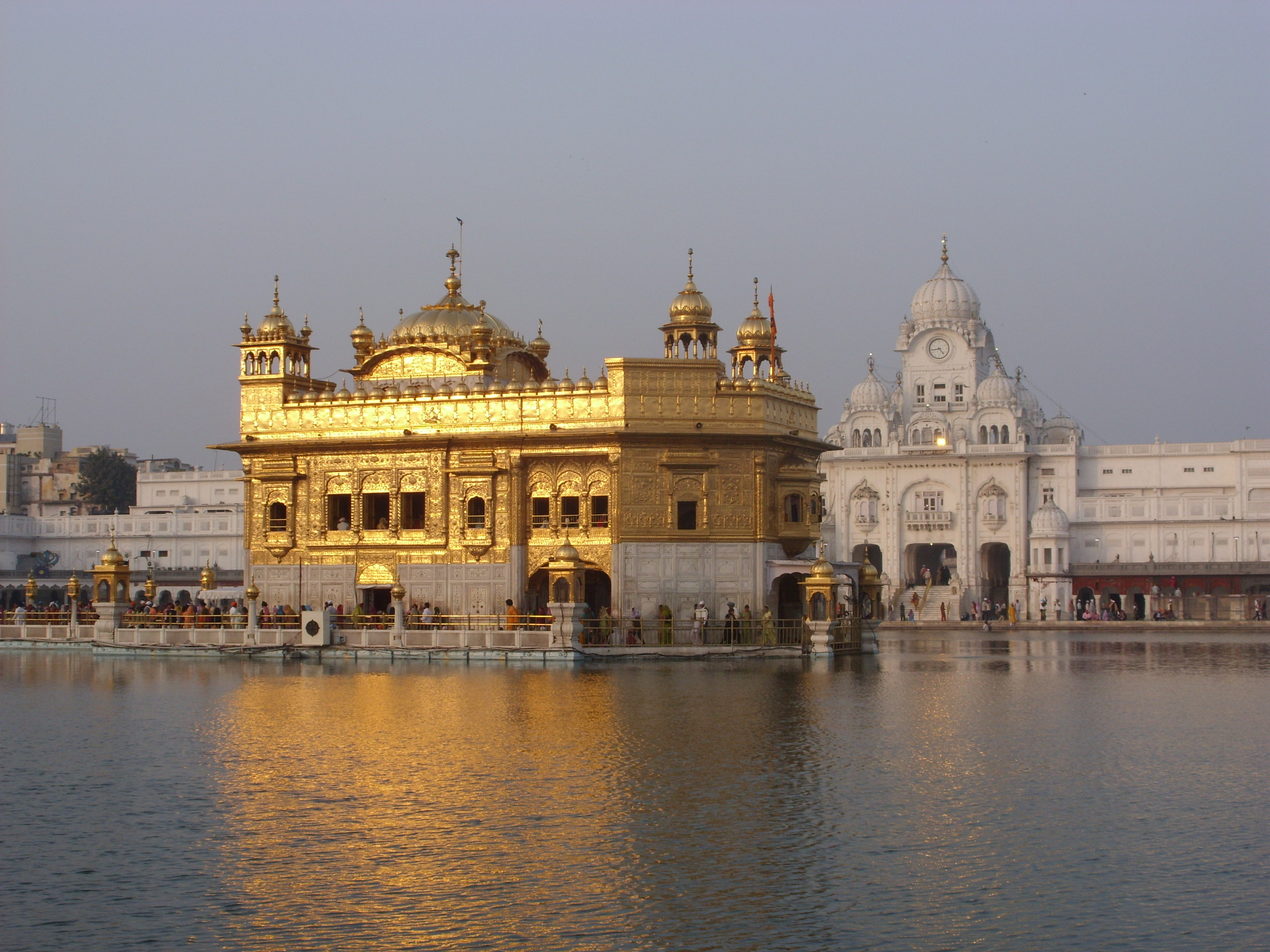
Images of The Holy Golden Temple of Amritsar in the film's trailer sparked controversy for being equated with alcohol and chicken.

Shri Akal Takht Jathedar (the highest member of the Sikh clergy), Giani Gurbachan Singh, objected to scenes in the film's trailer. He said that equating Holy Golden Temple with whisky and chicken is highly objectionable, as were film posters which had Kada with inscribed Gurbani shown with semi-clad women. It was appealed that Shiromani Gurdwara Parbandhak Committee should be consulted by all film producers before producing movies showing Sikh characters, religious places or religious symbols.

=== Censorship ===
Some Sikh organisations raised objections to scenes of the film which contained Kara used as a weapon and the lead character's turban being set on fire. Central Board of Film Certification decided to delete these scenes from the film. Kumar screened the movie for the organisations to ensure nothing that would hurt the Sikh community was shown.

== Critical response ==
Shubha Shetty Saha from Mid-Day described the comedy as "random and silly", but commented that "it is this randomness that also makes it a breezy, entertaining film". Devesh Sharma from Filmfare wrote that filmgoers should "watch the film if you like cornball comedies". Shubhra Gupta from The Indian Express, however, was less receptive to the film, which she rated 1.5 stars of 5, expounding, "The only thing which saves it is that it wears its silliness proudly on its hero's 'pug' (turban)".

Rohit Vats from Hindustan Times noted the film's plot holes, poor screenplay and problematic dialogue. Saibal Chatterjee from NDTV wrote, "What is irretrievably amiss with the film is that nothing it says manages to drift anywhere near some degree of coherence." Surbhi Redkar from Koimoi commented, "Akshay Kumar's Singh Is Bliing is enjoyable in parts but as a whole it is not up to the mark. It loses its bling over time and you are just left watching the silly antics of Mr. Singh."

Tushar Joshi from Daily News and Analysis wrote, "Singh is Bliing has some genuinely funny moments and Lara Dutta brings a certain freshness to the film." India TV wrote, "Overall, Singh is Bliing does not disappoint. One steps in expecting mindless humour, entertainment and some fairly good performances and on that front the film delivers. That there would be a spectacular story was never an expectation".

Bishwajit Aribam from Tehelka said that the film seemed to be a copy of the 2006 South Korean film My Wife is a Gangster 3.

== Box office ==
The film became Kumar's highest-opener, beating the previous record of Brothers as it collected ₹206.7 million (equivalent to ₹340 million or US$3.5 million in 2026) net on its opening day. On its second day the film collected ₹145.0 million (equivalent to ₹240 million or US$2.5 million in 2026) net. The film collected ₹192.7 million (equivalent to ₹320 million or US$3.3 million in 2026) net on its third day, bringing its first weekend total to an estimated ₹544.4 million (equivalent to ₹900 million or US$9.3 million in 2026).

The film grossed over ₹1.25 billion worldwide by the end of its theatrical run.

== See also ==
- James Bond, a 2015 Indian remake of My Wife Is a Gangster (2001)
