= Konchem Ishtam Konchem Kashtam =

2009 film by Kishore Kumar Pardasani

- Theatrical Poster
- Directed by: Kishore Kumar Pardasani
- Screenplay by: Deepak Raj; Vikram Siri; Abburi Ravi (dialogues)
- Story by: Kishore Kumar Pardasani
- Produced by: Nallamalapu Srinivas (Bujji)
- Starring: Siddharth; Tamannaah Bhatia
- Cinematography: Vijay K. Chakravarthy
- Edited by: A. Sreekar Prasad
- Music by: Shankar–Ehsaan–Loy (songs); Mani Sharma (score)
- Production company: Sri Lakshmi Narasimha Productions
- Release date: 5 February 2009
- Running time: 165 minutes
- Country: India
- Language: Telugu
- Box office: ₹18 crore distributors' share

Konchem Ishtam Konchem Kashtam (lit. 'A little love, a little hardship') is a 2009 Indian Telugu-language romantic comedy film directed by debutant Kishore Kumar Pardasani. The film stars Siddharth and Tamannaah in the lead roles, while Prakash Raj, Ramya Krishna, Nassar, and Brahmanandam play supporting roles. The songs were composed by the trio Shankar–Ehsaan–Loy, while the background score was composed by Mani Sharma. The film was remade in Bengali as Romeo (2011).

The film was released on 5 February 2009 and was a commercial success at the box office. It won three Nandi Awards and three CineMAA Awards, while Ramya Krishna won the Filmfare Award for Best Supporting Actress – Telugu.

== Plot ==
Geeta grows up in a village, under the shade of her doting father Subramanyam, who takes care of everything for her, and she is equally attached to him. She comes to Hyderabad for higher studies and stays at her uncle, Gachibowli Diwakar's house. There she meets with Siddharth "Siddhu", a friend of her cousin. Eventually, they grow close and fall in love.

Though Siddhu was a playful, carefree young man, he had problems at home because his parents had gotten divorced. He reveals this to Geeta and tells her that he is coming to her village to meet his father. There, he asks Geeta's hand in marriage, but Subramanyam does not agree. He wants to give his daughter to a big family, but at least he wants Siddhu's parents to be together. Siddhu asks him whether Subramanyam would agree to the marriage if his parents reunite, and Subramanyam agrees.

From then on, Siddhu and Geetha go through many efforts and trials to reunite Prakash and Rajyalakshmi. One night, when Prakash is driving Siddhu to his mother's home, they talk about his parents' separation. His father understands his feelings and says that the former could not have done anything, and Rajyalakshmi just left him. Siddhu responds that Prakash should have gone after her and never let her go. Even after this talk with Prakash, Geeta and Siddhu often fail, but eventually Siddhu reunites with his parents, and Subramanyam unites Geeta and Siddhu.

== Cast ==
- Siddharth as Siddharth "Siddhu" Verma
- Tamannaah Bhatia as Geeta Subramanyam
- Prakash Raj as Prakash Verma
- Ramya Krishna as Rajyalakshmi
- Nassar as Subramanyam
- Brahmanandam as Gachibowli Diwakar, Geeta's uncle
- Sudha as Geeta's mother
- Venu Madhav as Bangarraju "Bangaram"
- Hema as Gachibowli Diwakar's wife
- Karuna as Swathi, Geeta's cousin
- Samrat Reddy as Subodh
- Ambati Srinivas as Diwakar's neighbour
- Surekha Vani
- Raghu Babu
- Prudhvi Raj as Chari

Cameo appearance

- Raju Sundaram in the song "Evade Subramanyam"

== Music ==
Konchem Istam Konchem Kastam

Soundtrack album by Shankar–Ehsaan–Loy
- Released: December 2008
- Recorded: Purple Haze & Purple Rain Studios, Mumbai
- Genre: Feature film soundtrack
- Length: 38:40
- Label: Aditya Music

Shankar–Ehsaan–Loy chronology
Rock On!! (2008)	Konchem Istam Konchem Kastam (2008)	Chandni Chowk to China (2008)

Professional ratings
Review scores
Source	Rating
Bangalore Mirror	4/5 stars
Bollyspice	4/5 stars

The soundtrack features eight songs composed by Bollywood composer trio Shankar–Ehsaan–Loy with lyrics written by Sirivennela Sitaramasastri, Chandrabose and Ramajogayya Sastry. The film marks the Telugu debut of the composers and their second non-Hindi soundtrack after the 2001 Tamil film Aalavandhan.

The album received overwhelmingly positive reviews from the critics. Bangalore Mirror review, said: "The intelligently localized sound in the trio’s Telugu debut does the trick". Sheetal Tiwari of Bollyspice, in her four star review, summed up: "Shankar-Ehsaan-Loy have a created a totally different sound for KIKK. Do not be surprised if Shankar-Ehsaan-Loy make a habit of directing Telugu musicals because they have without a doubt left their mark." Indiaglitz described the album as an "amalgamation of class, mass and western tunes".

No.	Title	Lyrics	Artist(s)	Length
1.	"Egire Egire"	Chandrabose	Clinton Cerejo, Hemachandra, Raman Mahadevan, Shilpa Rao	4:08
2.	"Aanandama"	Sirivennela Sitaramasastri	Shankar Mahadevan, Shreya Ghoshal	4:50
3.	"Abacha"	Chandrabose	Mahalakshmi Iyer, Shilpa Rao	4:39
4.	"Konchem Istam Konchem Kastam (title track)"	Seetharama Sastry	Shankar Mahadevan	5:22
5.	"Evade Subramanyam"	Chinni Charan	Shankar Mahadevan	5:31
6.	"Antha Siddanga"	Seetharama Sastry	Sonu Nigam, Shreya Ghoshal	4:43
7.	"Enduku Chentaki"	Seetharama Sastry	Unni Krishnan	5:04
8.	"Panchirey"	Ramajogayya Sastry	Keerthi Sagathia, Sadhana Sargam	4:55
9.	"Endhuku Chentaki (film version)"	Seetharama Sastry	Shankar Mahadevan

== Reception ==
Radhika Rajamani of Rediff.com called the film a "perfect entertainer." Rajamani appreciate the characterization and performances and added, "credit should go to debutant director Kishore Kumar for penning a script which is entertaining yet meaningful." Idlebrain.com rated the film 3/5 and opined that the film's plus points are excellent songs and emotions in second half but the negative point is slow-paced narration.

== Awards ==
CineMAA Awards

- CineMAA Award for Best Comedian – Brahmanandam
- CineMAA Award for Best Debut Director – Kishore Kumar

57th Filmfare Awards South

- Filmfare Award for Best Supporting Actress – Telugu – Ramya Krishna
- Nominated – Filmfare Award for Best Music Director – Telugu
- Nominated – Filmfare Award for Best Film – Telugu

Nandi Awards

- Nandi Award for Akkineni Award for best home-viewing feature film
- Nandi Award for Best Female Comedian – Hema
- Nandi Award for Best Screenplay Writer – Vikram Sirikonda & Deepak Raj

Mirchi Music Awards (Telugu)

- Mirchi Music Awards Critic Awards (Album)
- Mirchi Music Awards Critic Awards (Song) – "Anandama"
