= Fugly (film) =

2014 Indian film by Kabir Sadanand

- Directed by: Kabir Sadanand
- Written by: Rahul Handa
- Produced by: Ashvini Yardi; Alka Bhatia
- Starring: Mohit Marwah; Kiara Advani; Jimmy Sheirgill; Vijender Singh; Arfi Lamba
- Cinematography: Milind Jog
- Edited by: Shounok Ghosh
- Music by: Yo Yo Honey Singh; Prashant Vadhyar; Raftaar
- Production company: Grazing Goat Pictures
- Distributed by: AA Films
- Release date: 13 June 2014
- Running time: 165 minutes
- Country: India
- Language: Hindi
- Budget: ₹100 million
- Box office: ₹136 million

Fugly (or "F*UGLY", as it appears on the poster) is a 2014 Indian Hindi language comedy-drama social thriller film directed by Kabir Sadanand and produced by Ashvini Yardi and Alka Bhatia. It was released on 13 June 2014. The film features Jimmy Sheirgill, Mohit Marwah, Vijender Singh, Arfi Lamba and Kiara Advani.

== Plot ==
Dev Majumdar, Devika Sharma, Gaurav Singh Ahlawat and Aditya Gupta are close friends. Gaurav is the son of the CM of Haryana, but is uninterested in his family's politics and is the only educated person in his family. Gaurav is kind-hearted, but always high on adrenaline because of his influential father. He has a knack for getting into trouble with the police because of this attitude, but the police tend to ignore his pranks.

A local grocer, Nunu, has an evil eye on Devika and one day he gropes her in his shop. The four of them decide to teach him a lesson. At night, they decide to break into his shop and thrash him warning him not to see her again. Although outnumbered and in a bad state, Nunu asks them to leave Devika behind for him. Dev is very angry and decides to teach him a lesson.

They put him in their car's trunk and drive him to an isolated location. They are intercepted by Inspector R.S. Chautala who is patrolling the highway. Gaurav, as usual, tries to act smart and gets involved in a scuffle with Chautala. This enrages him and he suspects foul play. When he checks the car he discovers Nunu inside the trunk. Chautala kills Nunu in order to frame them in his murder case. In the morning, after a severe threat he puts up a demand for Rs. 6.1 million in ransom money, which they have to arrange in 24 hours.

Gaurav is afraid to tell his father about the incident because he was actually involved in Nunu's kidnapping since this would cost his father his CM chair. Somehow they are able to arrange 2.4 million.

Chautala further blackmails them by recording them handing over the money to him, as evidence of attempting to bribe a policeman. He gives them 3 more days to arrange for an additional Rs. 1 million as a penalty. The four of them are further forced to arrange a rave party with a drug dealer, which is again raided by Chautala. He forces them into drug dealing as well to extract more juice out of them.

The four of them decide that they have enough and want to expose him in a sting operation. They almost succeed in extracting a confession from him on camera but are busted and Chautala also kidnaps Devika. Chautala outsmarts them on every step and the four slip deep into trouble with every step they try. Finally, they are arrested on false charges and meanwhile, are out on bail.

Dev in the end decides that he has to sacrifice his life to expose the truth. In the next scene, Dev is in the hospital and his narration is interrupted by Chautala. He clears up the ICU room for everyone to have a private moment with Dev. Dev tricks him by cutting off his own life support and getting into a scuffle with Chautala. As the medics and reporters rush into the room, they find Dev dead, and it appears as if Chautala has killed him. This is telecast live on the news. Chautala attempts to blackmail Gaurav's father in an isolated region but is shot dead by his colleague.

== Cast ==
- Mohit Marwah as Dev Majumdar
- Kiara Advani as Devika Sharma
- Jimmy Sheirgill as Inspector R.S. Chautala
- Vijender Singh as Gaurav Singh Ahlawat
- Arfi Lamba as Aditya Gupta
- Anshuman Jha as Cheeni (Special appearance)
- Mansha Bahl as Dr. Payal
- Sana Saeed as a dancer in song Lovely Jind Wali)
- Akshay Kumar as himself in "Fugly Title Song" (special appearance)
- Salman Khan as himself in "Fugly Title Song" (special appearance)

== Production ==
Plans for Fugly were announced in 2013, Filming for Fugly was initially intended to begin in September 2013, but was delayed until October of the same year. Filming took place in Delhi and Mumbai, and the key song was shot in March 2014.

== Release ==
=== Critical reception ===
Subhash K. Jha gave it 4 stars, writing "Fugly is cinema of social awakening. It tackles issues such as gay prostitution, khaki-clad fascism and the excess of television journalism, perhaps cramming in too many social issues in order to make the subject relevant and resonant. And yet nowhere does the director seem to bite into more than he can chew." Faheem Ruhani of India Today wrote "The four young actors do not leave much of a mark with their acting abilities in a script which is befuddled with hackneyed plot points and unimpressive dialogues. Jimmy Sheirgill is the only actor who manages to leave an impact with his dunk-on-power Haryanvi cop act. Fugly could have been a better film but in spite of its noble Rang De Basanti intentions it is nothing but frubbish."

Conversely, Shubhra Gupta of The Indian Express gave the film 1.5/5, writing "It begins with a hint of promise, and it could have gone down some paths less travelled. But it meanders, and loses its way." Anupama Chopra of Hindustan Times gave the film 2 stars out of 5, writing ″As writer Rahul and director Kabir try to stir up Rang De Basanti-style patriotism, Fugly becomes more and more preposterous. By the end, anything is possible, including a patient with third-degree burns fighting it out with the mighty Chautala on a hospital bed.″

=== Box office ===
Fugly had a ₹100 million (US$1.0 million) budget and grossed ₹418 million (US$4.3 million) worldwide.

== Soundtrack ==
Fugly

Soundtrack album by Yo Yo Honey Singh, Raftaar and Prashant Vadhyar
- Released: 17 May 2014
- Genre: Bollywood Music
- Length: 22:37
- Language: Hindi
- Label: T-Series
External audio
- Audio Jukebox on YouTube

=== Soundtrack ===
The soundtrack is composed by Prashant Vadhyar, Yo Yo Honey Singh & Raftaar. All lyrics written by Yo Yo Honey Singh, Raftaar, Arshia Nahid, Sumit Aroraa, Niren Bhatt & Rajveer Ahuja.

| No. | Title | Singer(s) | Length |
|---|---|---|---|
| 1. | "Fugly Fugly Kya Hai" | Yo Yo Honey Singh |
| 2. | "Lovely Jind Wali" | Pawni Pandey, Santokh Singh, Prashant Vadhyar |
| 3. | "Dhup Chik" | Badshah, & Aastha Gill |
| 4. | "G Pe Danda" | Aman Trikha, Pawni Pandey, Prashant Vadhyar |
| 5. | "Dhuaan" | Arijit Singh, Pawni Pandey |
| 6. | "Banjaare" | Yo Yo Honey Singh | 4:05 |
| 7. | "Good in Bed" | Rajiv Sundaresan, Prashant Vadhyar, Sunaina Sarkar |
| Total length: | | | 22:37 |
