= Vikram Sirikonda =

Indian film director and screenwriter (born 1977)

- Born: Warangal, Telangana, India
- Education: B.M.S. Institute of Technology and Management
- Occupations: Screenwriter; Director

Vikram Sirikonda is an Indian film director and screenwriter, primarily known for his works in Telugu Film Industry. Vikram is known for his screen writing to films such as Telugu Movies Race Gurram (2014), Mirapakai (2011) and Konchem Ishtam Konchem Kashtam (2009). Vikram had won the best screenplay award (2009 Nandi award) for Konchem Ishtam Konchem Kashtam (2009) movie on his debut as screenwriter.

== Early life ==
Vikram Sirikonda was born in Warangal, Telangana and moved to Hyderabad in 1993 along with his family. From his childhood, Vikram had a flair for acting, story writing and dialogues and had written many stage dramas. Vikram has a bachelor's degree in engineering from BMS college, Bangalore and has a diploma in film making from Asian Academy of Film & Television, Delhi.

== Career ==
After completing his studies, Vikram joined as an assistant director for Tagore (2003), directed by V. V. Vinayak. Vikram continued to assist V. V. Vinayak during Samba (2004) and Bunny (2005). In 2006, Vikram joined Raghava Lawrence as the first assistant director, in Style.

He then ventured into screen-writing and had quick successes in Konchem Ishtam Konchem Kashtam (2009), Mirapakay (2011), and Race Gurram (2014). He made his directional debut with Ravi Teja's Touch Chesi Chudu, in 2018. It was produced by Nallamalapu Bujji and had music by Pritam's apprentice band, JAM8. The release received unfavorable reviews from both critics and audiences. However, the movie found success among OTT/Television audience.

== Filmography ==
Year	Film	Cast	Credits
2009	Konchem Ishtam Konchem Kashtam	Siddartha, Tamannaah Bhatia	Screen Writer
2011	Mirapakay	Ravi Teja, Richa Gangopadhyaay, Deeksha Seth	Screen Writer
2014	Race Gurram	Allu Arjun, Shruti Haasan	Screen Writer
2018	Touch Chesi Chudu	Ravi Teja, Raashi Khanna, Seerat Kapoor	Director
2023	Bhola Shankar	Chiranjeevi, Keerthy Suresh, Tammana bhatia	Associate Writer
2023	The Bomb Man (Netflix)	Yet to be decided by Arka Media Works	Screen Writer

=== Awards ===
- Nandi Award, Nandi Award for Best Screenplay Writer, 2009 for Koncham Istam Koncham Kastam
- Akkineni family film award, Best Screenplay, 2009 Best Screenplay Writer for Koncham Istam Koncham Kastam
