= Gopala Gopala (2015 film) =

2015 film by Kishore Kumar Pardasani

- Theatrical release poster
- Directed by: Kishore Kumar Pardasani
- Screenplay by: Kishore Kumar Pardasani; Bhoopathy Raja; Deepak Raj
- Dialogues by: Sai Madhav Burra
- Story by: Umesh Shukla; Bhavesh Mandalia
- Based on: OMG – Oh My God!
- Produced by: D. Suresh Babu; Sharrath Marar
- Starring: Venkatesh; Pawan Kalyan; Shriya Saran; Mithun Chakraborty
- Cinematography: Jayanan Vincent
- Edited by: Gautham Raju
- Music by: Anup Rubens
- Production companies: Suresh Productions; North Star Entertainment
- Distributed by: BlueSky Cinemas Inc. (United States)
- Release date: 10 January 2015
- Running time: 153 minutes
- Country: India
- Language: Telugu

Gopala Gopala is a 2015 Indian Telugu-language fantasy comedy drama film directed by Kishore Kumar Pardasani. The film is produced by D. Suresh Babu and Sharrath Marar under the Suresh Productions and North Star Entertainment banners. It stars Venkatesh in the lead role alongside Pawan Kalyan in an extended cameo appearance while Shriya Saran, Mithun Chakraborty, Ashish Vidyarthi and Posani Krishna Murali play supporting roles. The film is a remake of the 2012 Hindi film OMG – Oh My God! which was itself based on the Gujarati stage play Kanji Viruddh Kanji which is in turn inspired from 2001 Australian film The Man Who Sued God.

It follows the story of an atheist, Gopala Rao (Venkatesh), who sues God after losing his shop in an earthquake. Religious organisations revolt against him and Lord Vishnu visits him as his human guide, under his incarnation Krishna (Kalyan).

Gopala Gopala was made on a budget of ₹40 crore. Production began on 9 June 2014. It was predominantly shot in and around Visakhapatnam, with a few sections filmed in Hyderabad and Varanasi. Anup Rubens composed the music while Jayanan Vincent was the film's cinematographer. The film was released worldwide on 10 January 2015 as a Sankranthi release. It received positive reviews from critics and was modestly successful grossing ₹66.1 crore with a distributor share of ₹41.1 crore.

== Plot ==
Kanneganti Gopala Rao, an atheist and successful businessman, lives with his deeply religious wife Meenakshi and their school-aged son Moksha. He owns a shop selling idols of Hindu gods and has prospered from the business. When he disrupts a dangerous ritual organised by the fraudulent godman Siddheswar Maharaj, the latter threatens him with dire consequences.

An earthquake destroys Gopala Rao's shop, which is mortgaged and burdened with loans. The insurance company rejects his claim, citing the disaster as an "Act of God", leaving him in severe financial difficulty. His attempt to sell the land also fails because it is considered "impure" due to the shattered idols.

Seeking justice, Gopala Rao decides to sue God, shocking Meenakshi and meeting scepticism from legal professionals. He eventually secures the assistance of Akbar Khan, a disabled lawyer, under a provision of the Indian Constitution permitting self-representation when no lawyer is available. Gopala Rao names self-styled godmen Leelaladhara Swamy, Siddheswar Maharaj and Gopika Matha as representatives of God in the case.

During the proceedings, supporters of Leeladhara Swamy threaten and physically attack Gopala Rao. Lord Krishna, disguised as an ordinary man named Govinda Gopala Hari, rescues him and takes him home. Gopala Rao discovers that fundamentalists have stoned his residence, prompting his father-in-law to take Meenakshi and Moksha away for their safety. Hari helps Gopala Rao by purchasing his mortgaged house and providing financial support until the case is resolved.

Gopala Rao gains public attention after appearing on television to criticise fraudulent godmen and superstition. Hundreds of people whose insurance claims have been rejected under Act of God provisions join his cause. He sends legal notices to mullahs and Catholic priests, who appear in court alongside Leeladhara Swamy and the other godmen. Their collective demands for ₹500 crore in compensation place considerable pressure on the insurance company.

As the trial progresses, defence lawyer Shankar Narayana challenges Gopala Rao to prove that God was responsible for the destruction of his shop. The judge gives him seven days to present his evidence. On Hari's advice, Gopala Rao studies the Bhagavad Gita, Bible and Quran, concluding that God may create and destroy for reasons beyond human understanding.

Before he can present his arguments, a follower of Leeladhara Swamy stabs Gopala Rao, leaving him in a coma. His family, now supportive of his cause, prays for his recovery. A month later, Leeladhara Swamy conspires with doctors to ensure Gopala Rao's death. Hari intervenes, revealing himself as Lord Vishnu in his Viswaroopam. He explains that the destruction of the shop was a divine act intended to challenge false beliefs and encourage a truer understanding of God.

Gopala Rao awakens to learn that he has won the case and that compensation has been awarded to all those affected. However, Leeladhara Swamy and the other godmen exploit the outcome by portraying him as a divine messenger. Leeladhara Swamy claims that Gopala Rao has said in his dreams that he will die on Vijayadasami, like Shirdi Sai Baba. As the public, influenced by the godmen, prepares to build a temple in his honour, Gopala Rao and Hari leave the hospital to confront the crowd.

Gopala Rao smashes his own idol, which the people have been worshipping, and denounces the fraudulent godmen for exploiting religious beliefs. He urges the public to recognise the God within each person and help one another as the true expression of devotion. The enraged crowd turns against the godmen and attempts to attack them, but Gopala Rao intervenes to prevent violence.

Hari then ascends into the sky, leaving behind a keychain that Gopala Rao recognises as his. When Gopala Rao tries to keep it, Hari's voice warns him that treating objects as divine would distract people from recognising the value of human beings. Gopala Rao throws the keychain towards the sky, where it disappears, and reconciles with Meenakshi, Moksha and the rest of his family.

== Cast ==
- Venkatesh as Kanneganti Gopal Rao, a lawyer who fight's for justice, The main protagonist
- Pawan Kalyan as Govinda Gopala Hari (in disguise) and Lord Krishna, Incarnation of Lord Vishnu (in real)
- Shriya Saran as Meenakshi
- Mithun Chakraborty as Leeladhara Swamy
- Posani Krishna Murali as Siddheswar Maharaj
- Diksha Panth as Gopika Matha
- Brahmanandam as Yadagiri
- Ashish Vidyarthi as Shankar Narayana
- Krishnudu as Ottu
- Murali Sharma as Akbar Khan
- Ranganath as the Judge
- Raghu Babu as Insurance company owner
- Vennela Kishore as Rambabu
- Madhu Shalini as DD TV reporter
- Anisha Ambrose as a journalist
- Rallapalli as Gopala Rao's uncle
- Prudhvi Raj as lawyer
- Ali as Krishna and Gopal Rao's friend
- Sivannarayana Naripeddi as Bhanwarlal Seth
- Deekshithulu as Swamiji
- Narra Srinu as Gopala Rao's brother-in-law
- Anju Asrani as Gopala Rao's elder sister
- Bharani as Leeladhara Swamy's disciple
- Dhanraj as one of the people in court who interacts with Govinda Gopala Hari

== Production ==
=== Development ===
In early April 2013, the Paruchuri Brothers informed the media that they were in the final stages of acquiring the remake rights of Umesh Shukla's OMG – Oh My God! (2012) and that work on the script would begin afterwards. It was also said that Ravi Teja would play the role of Krishna in this film, originally played by Akshay Kumar, and that the official confirmation of the film would come within a week. OMG – Oh My God! itself was an adaptation of the Gujarati play Kanji Viruddh Kanji. D. Suresh Babu acquired the remake rights in mid November 2013 and Venkatesh was confirmed to be a part of the film's principal cast. Kishore Kumar Pardasani was selected to direct the film.

After much speculation, Suresh Babu confirmed to the media in mid-February 2014 that Pawan Kalyan would play the role of Krishna and Sharrath Marar would be co-producing the film with North Star Entertainment. After considering the titles Deva Devam Bhaje and Gopala Gopala, the latter was finalised just before its formal launch on 9 June 2014 at Hyderabad. Anoop Rubens was confirmed to replace Sohail Sen as the music director. Jayanan Vincent was selected to handle the cinematography, despite reports stating that P. C. Sreeram would be doing the job.

=== Casting ===
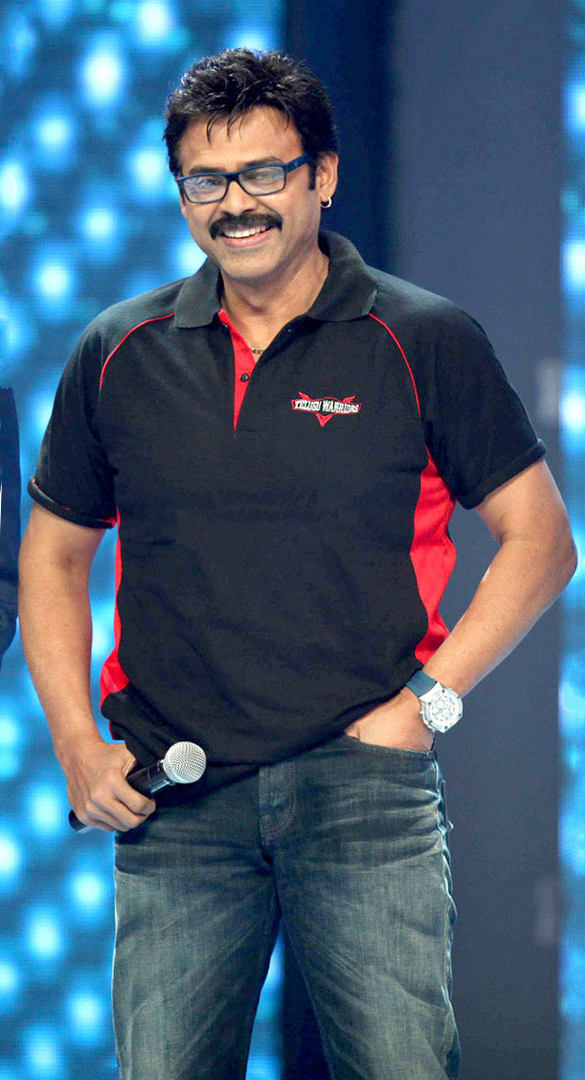
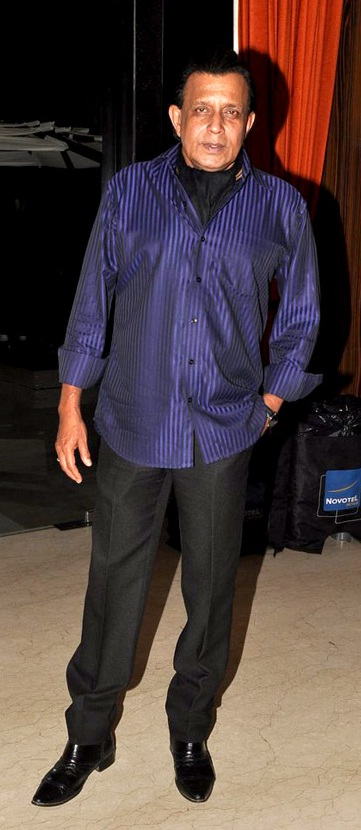
Principal cast of the film from left to right : Pawan Kalyan, Venkatesh and Mithun Chakraborty

Venkatesh and Rajendra Prasad were initially reported to reprise the roles of Akshay Kumar and Paresh Rawal from the original. Venkatesh was later confirmed as playing the role played by Paresh Rawal and Vikram was approached for the role of Krishna. Pawan Kalyan was engaged for the same part later on. Venkatesh personally researched and purchased his outfits., incorporating a number of differently-coloured short kurtas into his costume. He ended up with more than 40 changes onscreen.

Kalyan underwent a special diet and exercise to lose weight for the role in the film. Kishore Kumar said that Kalyan would be seen for 25 minutes, as in the original, but this was later extended to 45 minutes. Kalyan was slightly overweight before signing the film and followed a crash diet comprising milk and fruit, avoiding carbohydrates and oily foods. Reports stated that he would use a Hyosung GV650 Aquila Pro in the film. Later his team met Akshay Warde, who had designed a special Vardenchi motorcycle for Akshay Kumar in the original. Warde completed designing a new motorcycle within a month, albeit without a support team like he had had when making the original film.

After considering Nayanthara, Anjali, and Radhika Apte for the female lead, Shriya Saran was finalised for the role in early May 2014 after Nayanthara walked out of the project citing scheduling and payment issues. She called her role a "beautifully etched" and an "inspiring" one. Saran added that the relationship between her and Venkatesh in the film would encapsulate the central debate of the existence of God. Mithun Chakraborthy was signed to repeat his role from the original in early June 2014, thereby making his Telugu debut. Posani Krishna Murali, Krishnudu, Raghu Babu, and Vennela Kishore were selected to play other important roles in the film. It was originally unclear whose role she was remaking from the original when she was engaged on the film. Diksha Panth was selected to play the role that Poonam Jhawer performed in the original. Anisha Ambrose made a cameo appearance.

=== Filming ===
In early May 2014, the film's co-producer Sharrath Marar, in an interview with IANS, said that the regular shooting was planned to begin on 19 May 2014 after Pawan Kalyan was relieved from his political duties, also saying that the makers were aiming for a September 2014 release. However, it emerged that the film would be officially launched on 2 June 2014 and shooting would be done in a specially erected set in Hyderabad. Principal photography eventually commenced a week later on 9 June 2014 at Ramanaidu Studios at Nanakramguda in Hyderabad. Venkatesh joined the shoot in the same day. Pawan Kalyan allotted 25 days for the shooting of his scenes in the film.

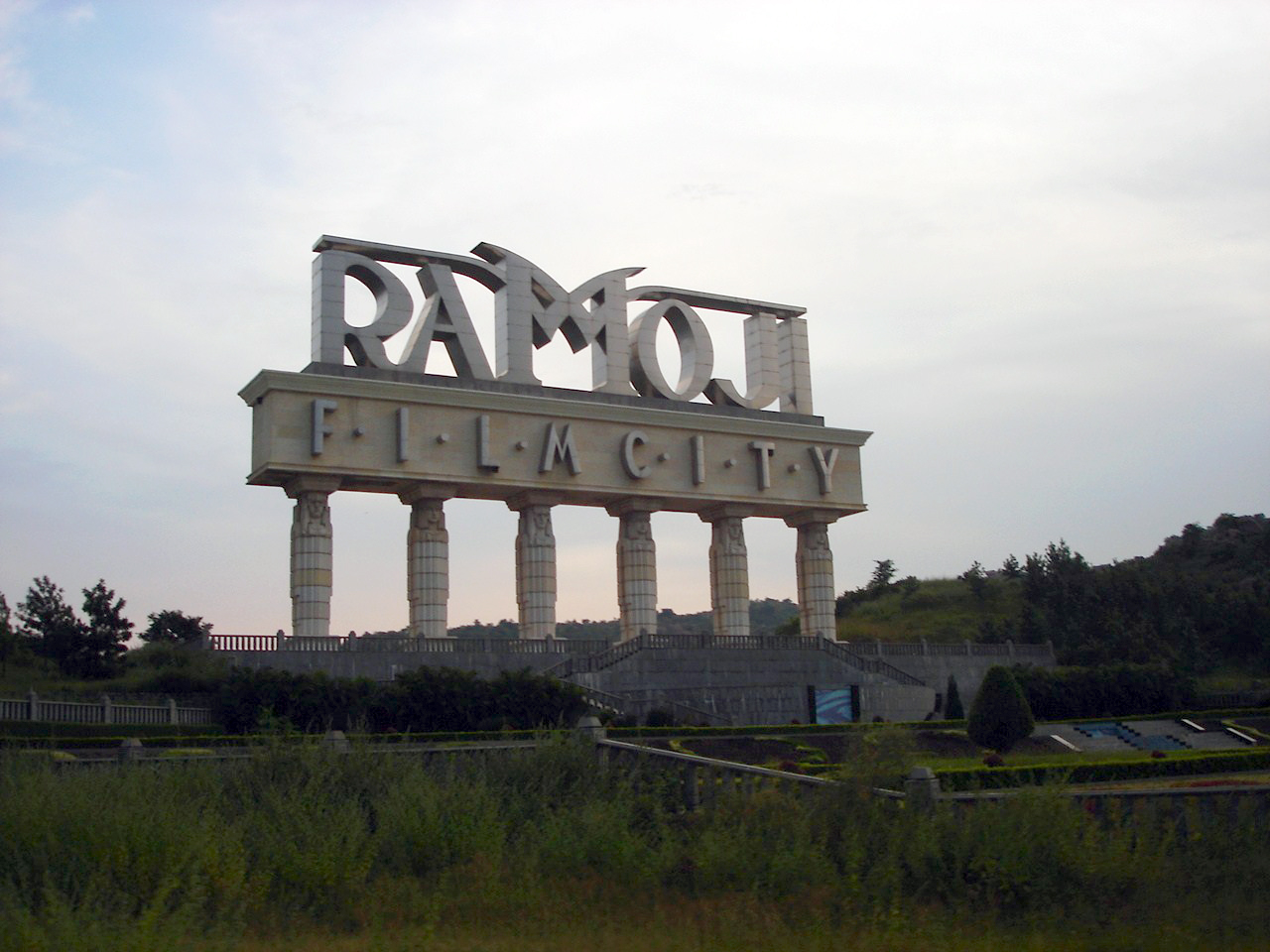
Ramoji Film City, where parts of the film were shot.

The film's second schedule started on 18 July 2014 at Hyderabad after a brief break while Venkatesh was promoting his film Drushyam. Pawan Kalyan was reported as joining the shoot on 23 July 2014 and a special sequence in which he would be seen driving his personal motorcycle was planned to be shot. His part in the film's dialogue was expected to be completed. However, Kalyan joined the sets two days in advance and scenes featuring him and Venkatesh were shot. The film's shoot continued in the outskirts of Hyderabad where scenes with Venkatesh. Kalyan and Shriya Saran were shot. The film's shoot continued in late August 2014 at Nanakramguda. The exteriors of Osmania University's College for Women in Koti, Hyderabad were used to shoot a court scene. Producer Daggubati Suresh Babu said that the college had a look which suited the scene.

Filming went ahead in Ramoji Film City. Kalyan shot his introductory song in late September 2014. The filming was almost complete and in the middle of October 2014, the film's climax was shot in the outskirts of Hyderabad. An additional song with Venkatesh and Kalyan was also planned. At the end of October 2014, earthquake scenes were shot with Venkatesh and others at Ramoji Film City. Filming then continued in Nanakramguda. By then, three-quarters of the film's shoot was complete and Kalyan was reported as having completed shooting for his part during the subsequent weeks. Shooting for two songs and graphics work remained to be completed. By mid-November 2014, the film's shoot neared completion.

Venkatesh and Shriya joined the film's sets in Vishakhapatnam where a song and a few more scenes were shot. On completion, the production team revealed that the schedule was shot in the city to boost morale at Ramanaidu Studios and also demonstrate to the Bengali and Oriya film industries that shoots could be carried out smoothly even after the destruction of the city by Cyclone Hudhud. The film continued to be shot near Varanasi in early December 2014, with Venkatesh and other actors taking part. A song with Venkatesh and Kalyan was shot in the outskirts of Hyderabad around the end of December. The final schedule began the next day and Kalyan's crucial scenes were planned.

== Themes and influences ==
The film is an official remake of the 2012 Hindi film OMG – Oh My God! directed by Umesh Shukla which tells the story of an atheist who sues God for causing an earthquake in which he loses his shop. The film focuses mostly on exploiting people's faith in the name of business and money-making. Daggubati Venkatesh said in an interview to The Hindu that this film would focus on the tensions between Indian rituals and spirituality. In the film, the deity involved, Krishna, teaches the atheist protagonist to use the principles of the Bhagavad Gita, Bible and Quran to win his case. A song introducing the atheist's character, his family and his views on rituals was added in which was not a part of the original.

Several new scenes were included in the Telugu version, including two songs. The film also deals with the issue of fake godmen. Daggubati Venkatesh said in an interview with Suresh Kavirayani of the Deccan Chronicle, "We all know about these people. Media also publishes stories about them all the time. We wanted to create some awareness among the people, so we touched on the theme of fake godmen. But there are genuine people too, who give wonderful messages and enlighten people with their preaching". The lyrics of the song Enduko Enduko question the superstitions people believe in.

Dialogues written for and uttered by Kalyan's character in the film were linked to the politics of Andhra Pradesh. Comments such as "Nenu time ki raavadam kaadu tammudu, nenu vachake time avutondi" ("I don't come on time; time starts when I come") (Note: These dialogues are translated from Telugu to English.) and "Samardhulu intlo undipothe asamardhulu rajyamelutaru" ("The incompetent will rule if the competent stay at home") appeared to refer to the change in government and Kalyan's own entry into politics.

== Music ==
Anup Rubens was signed in on to compose the film's soundtrack and score in June 2014. Before the official launch of the film, Rubens completed composing a song and was said by the makers to complete composing all the songs in a week's time from the launch. The soundtrack consisted of 4 songs whose lyrics were penned by Chandrabose, Sirivennela Sitaramasastri and Anantha Sreeram. Lahari Music acquired the soundtrack's marketing rights in mid-August 2014. The soundtrack was released on 25 December 2014, and achieved high chart rankings.

== Release ==
The film was planned for release in either September or October 2014, but a January 2015 Sankranthi release was announced in July 2014. Gemini TV acquired the film's television broadcast rights in early December 2014. Suresh Babu sold the rights for an amount of ₹200 million (US$2.1 million) as a three film package including Drushyam and Bhimavaram Bullodu, both co-produced by him. The release date was confirmed as 9 January 2015. United States theatrical rights were acquired by BlueSky Cinemas Inc. The release date was postponed to 10 January 2015. Because of the demand for the film's tickets, 20 more theatres were added to the original list.

The film was released in 1400 screens (1200 theatres) worldwide; 1100 theatres in India, out of which 850 theatres were in the AP/Nizam region, more than 100 theatres in United States and 50 theatres in the rest of the world. A charity performance was held at Shiva Parvathi theatre in Kukatpally, Hyderabad on 10 January 2015 at 2:30 AM. Photos featuring fans celebrating the film's release were widely circulated on Twitter.

=== Marketing ===
The film's poster was unveiled on 28 November 2014, designed by Anil and Bhanu of AB Core Design. It began trending on social networking sites within few hours and became a worldwide trending topic. Anoop Rubens received acclaim for his background score in the poster. Another poster featuring Kalyan and Venkatesh on a motorcycle was unveiled on 16 December 2014. The theatrical trailer was unveiled on 4 December 2014 at the audio launch event. It began trending instantly on YouTube and within two days, it reached the first position in India's Top Trending videos on YouTube displacing Yennai Arindhaal... from first place with a view count of nearly 0.5 million.

=== Legal Issues ===
Vishwa Hindu Parishad and Bhagyanagar Ganesh Utsav Samithi submitted an appeal to the regional director of Central Board of Film Certification on 31 December 2014 claiming that the film had objectionable scenes which hurt the religious sentiments of Hindu people. In a statement to IANS, they said that they had sought action before the release of the movie as any protest later would be futile. In an interview with Suhas Yellapuntala of The New Indian Express, Venkatesh said "It’s natural for certain people to react and they are free to express their views but once they see the film they won’t look at it that way. In case, there are any unfortunate incidents, we will convince them and it’ll be fine. Because whatever the scriptures tell, that’s what I tell in the film".

Raghunadha Rao filed a similar case against the film at Saifabad police station on 10 January 2015. Telangana lawyers lodged a complaint with the law minister A. Indrakaran Reddy on 16 January 2015 and requested him to take immediate steps to delete objectionable scenes from the film. The division bench comprising Chief Justice Kalyan Jyoti Sengupta and Justice P. V. Sanjay Kumar of the Hyderabad High Court pointed out that it could not grant any order without making the producer and director of the film a party to the case. Raghunadha Rao then was permitted to file a fresh petition seeking a ban on the screening of the film.

== Reception ==
=== Critical reception ===
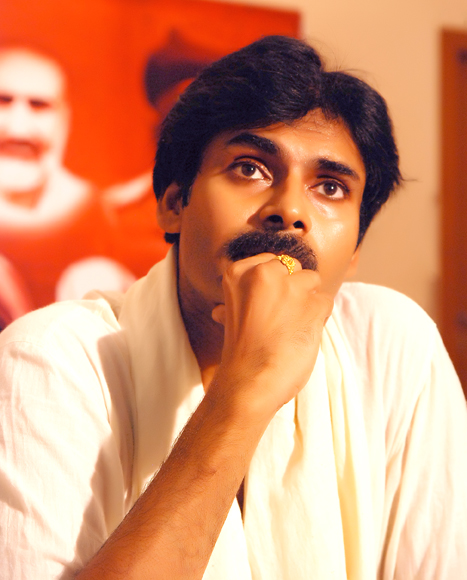
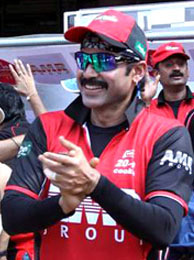
Both Pawan Kalyan (left) and Venkatesh (right) won critical acclaim for their performances.

Sangeetha Devi Dundoo of The Hindu wrote, "To a large extent, Gopala Gopala stays true to the essence of OMG – Oh My God! and it’s heart-warming to see a Telugu film backed by big stars taking up the idea of spirituality versus superstitious beliefs". Karthik Keramalu of IBN Live rated the film 3.5 out of 5 and wrote, "Like the recently-released Hindi film PK, Gopala Gopala too challenges blind faith. Watching the two actors light up the screen, who, for many years have starred in successful remakes, is a nostalgic tribute. Pawan Kalyan with a charming smile confesses that dharma supports rightfulness; however, in no manner, does it mean to curb the will to criticize religion and its beliefs".

Hemanth Kumar of The Times of India rated the film 3.5 out of 5 and wrote "Gopala Gopala begins as a story about an atheist, who seems to offend a lot of people around him, and in the end, the film drives home the point that when you help others, it is as good as worshiping God himself. And in doing so, the film churns out plenty of thought provoking questions which force you to look for answers within yourself and this is perhaps the film's biggest achievement. The entire film turns out to be quite a gratifying experience if you play close attention to the dialogues and conversations between the lead characters, played by Venkatesh and Pawan Kalyan". Suresh Kavirayani of the Deccan Chronicle rated the film 3.5 out of 5 and wrote "In the second half, the film drags a bit, especially the swamijis’ scenes. The climax is also a bit boring. But, if you haven't seen the original Paresh Rawal and Akshay Kumar starrer OMG — Oh My God!, then you must watch Gopala Gopala. Pawan Kalyan fans will love the film and it's a treat for them with two big stars sharing screen space".

In contrast, IANS rated the film 2.5 out of 5 and wrote, "It would've been nice if the core plot was retained and changes were made to the film and its characters. But you can't watch Gopala Gopala with such expectations because it successfully reproduces scenes and characters from the original as though remaking is misunderstood as copying frame-to-frame. One way it's commendable that the makers didn't try to make many changes since the remake features popular stars such as Daggubati and Pawan, who usually play to the gallery. But all this has been done at the cost of creativity and that's what makes the remake less exciting, if not boring."

=== Box office ===
The film earned a share of around ₹9.19 crore on the opening day and emerged as the fourth highest opener of all time in the AP/Nizam areas. It stood in the fourth spot in the list of top ten opening day shares at the AP/Nizam box office behind Attarintiki Daredi (2013), Aagadu (2014) and Baadshah (2013). The film collected $0.6 million in two days at USA box office and was expected to cross the $1 million mark soon. The film collected a share of ₹4 crore on its second day, taking its two-day AP/Nizam box office total to ₹13.5 crore. With the inclusion of takings from Karnataka, Rest of India and overseas markets, the two-day worldwide box office collection was valued at ₹19.5 crore. The film's trade witnessed a huge drop on its third day by collecting nearly ₹2 crore at AP/Nizam Box office. But it topped the weekend box office followed by Tevar and Raghuvaran B. Tech (dubbed version of Velaiilla Pattadhari).

It also stood in the top spot at Chennai box office followed by PK and Kappal. The film also took good openings in the United States where it collected ₹4.37 crore in the weekend of 9–11 January 2015. The film collected ₹17 crore in the first five days at AP/Nizam box office and ₹26.5 crore at the worldwide box office. With this, it surpassed the opening weekend figures of Aagadu at AP/Nizam box office, but failed to surpass its worldwide three-day collections. The film collected a worldwide share of ₹29.85 crore in six days surpassing the first week collections of Naayak (2013) and Ramayya Vasthavayya (2013). The six-day AP/Nizam area share was ₹23.08 crore with which it surpassed the first week AP/Nizam share of Businessman (2012). According to The Times of India, the film collected huge shares and headed towards record collections overseas, expected to cross ₹30 crore mark.

The film collected a share of ₹26.15 crore at AP/Nizam box office and nceearly a share of ₹33 crore at the worldwide box office in seven days and surpassed the first week collection of Seethamma Vakitlo Sirimalle Chettu (2013) at AP/Nizam box office and Baadshah, Gabbar Singh (2012) at the worldwide box office. The film collected a gross of ₹59 crore and a share of ₹37.9 crore in nine days at the worldwide box office thus surpassing the lifetime collections of Pokiri (2006) and took the 18th spot in the list of all-time top 25 Telugu films with highest worldwide share. The film also created a new record in Mandapeta in East Godavari district of Andhra Pradesh by collecting ₹0.208 crore in nine days, breaking the record set by Magadheera (2009) in its lifetime run. The film witnessed a drop in its collections at AP/Nizam box office and earned around ₹31 crore share in ten days. However the film crossed ₹40 crore mark at the worldwide box office overtaking the totals of Businessman and Robo, the Telugu dubbed version of Enthiran (2010). Due to stiff competition from I, Pataas and Temper, the film collected a gross of ₹88.1 crore and a distributor share of ₹41.1 crore at the worldwide box office during its lifetime run. The film passed the ₹50 crore gross mark (₹51.15 crore) and collected ₹33.5 crore share in its lifetime at the AP/Nizam box office alone.

== Accolades ==
Ceremony	Category	Nominee	Result	Reference(s)
IIFA Utsavam 2015	Best Performance In a Supporting Role — Male	Pawan Kalyan	Nominated	
IIFA Utsavam 2015	Best Music Direction	Anoop Rubens	Nominated	
IIFA Utsavam 2015	Best Playback Singer — Male	Haricharan and Dhananjay (for "Bhaje Bhaje")	Nominated	
