= OMG – Oh My God! =

2012 Indian film by Umesh Shukla

- Theatrical release poster
- Directed by: Umesh Shukla
- Written by: Umesh Shukla; Saumya Joshi; Bhavesh Mandalia
- Based on: Kanji Virrudh Kanji; The Man Who Sued God
- Produced by: Ashvini Yardi; B.K. Modi; Vikram Malhotra
- Starring: Akshay Kumar; Paresh Rawal; Mithun Chakraborty
- Cinematography: Sethu Sriram
- Edited by: Tushar Shivan; Rajesh Panchal
- Music by: Score: Amar Mohile; Songs: Himesh Reshammiya; Sachin–Jigar; Meet Bros. Anjjan
- Production companies: Grazing Goat Pictures; S Spice Studios
- Distributed by: Viacom18 Motion Pictures; Wave Cinemas Ponty Chadha
- Release date: 28 September 2012
- Running time: 130 minutes
- Country: India
- Language: Hindi
- Budget: ₹19.99 crores
- Box office: ₹149.90 crores

Oh My God! is a 2012 Indian Hindi-language fantasy satirical comedy drama film written and directed by Umesh Shukla and produced by Viacom 18 Motion Pictures, S Spice Studios, Grazing Goat Pictures, and Playtime Creations. The storyline is based on the Gujarati stage-play Kanji Virudh Kanji, itself inspired by the Australian film The Man Who Sued God. The film stars Akshay Kumar, Paresh Rawal and Mithun Chakraborty in leading roles, with Om Puri, Govind Namdev, Poonam Jhawer, Puja Gupta, and Mahesh Manjrekar in supporting roles.

Made on a budget of ₹20 crore (US$2.1 million), the film was released on 28 September 2012 and received positive reviews from critics.

It was remade in Telugu as Gopala Gopala (2015) with Venkatesh, Pawan Kalyan, and Shriya Saran. It was also remade in Kannada as Mukunda Murari (2016) with Upendra and Sudeep.

A spiritual successor, OMG 2, written and directed by Amit Rai and again starring Kumar, was released in August 2023; despite Rawal not returning to play the leading role and being replaced by Pankaj Tripathi, his wife Swaroop was associated with the sequel as a producer.

== Plot ==
Kanji Lalji Mehta, a middle-class Gujarati atheist, owns a shop selling Hindu idols and antiques in Mumbai. He routinely mocks the religious practices around him until a low-intensity earthquake strikes the city, destroying only his shop. While his family and friends blame the disaster on his scepticism, Kanji attempts to claim insurance. The insurance company rejects his claim, citing an exclusion clause for natural calamities classified as an "Act of God". Left with no financial recourse, Kanji decides to sue God, but is rejected by every lawyer he approaches. Hanif Qureshi, a working-class Muslim attorney, eventually helps him file the lawsuit, allowing Kanji to represent himself. Legal notices are sent to the insurance firm as well as to prominent spiritual leaders —Siddheshwar Maharaj, Gopi Maiyya, and their organization's leader, Leeladhar Swamy— summoning them to court as God's earthly representatives.

As the bizarre lawsuit gains media attention, Kanji faces intense harassment and threats from religious extremists. His bank forecloses on his home, and his terrified family abandons him. He is rescued from an angry mob by Krishna Vasudev Yadav, a mysterious man claiming to be a real estate agent from Gokul, Uttar Pradesh, who quietly displays supernatural abilities. Following Krishna’s advice, Kanji takes his grievances to television networks, sparking a massive public response. Countless disaster victims join the lawsuit, which expands to include Christian priests and Muslim clerics as co-defendants. When the judge demands written theological proof that natural disasters represent the explicit will of God, Krishna guides Kanji to study the Bhagavad Gita, the Quran, and the Holy Bible. Kanji discovers specific passages in each text stating that the universe and all occurrences within it are driven entirely by divine will, significantly strengthening his legal standing.

During a heated court session, Kanji suffers a stroke that leaves him comatose and paralyzed. A month later, he awakens in the hospital to find Krishna, who reveals his true identity as Krishna and completely cures Kanji's paralysis. Krishna explains that while he created the universe, organized religion was entirely manufactured by humans. He admits to orchestrating the localized earthquake to destroy Kanji's shop, knowing that an outspoken atheist would legally challenge the commercialized religious system and expose the fraudulent godmen who exploit divine fear for financial gain. Krishna adds that he does not reside in temples or desire materialistic offerings, preferring that resources be directed toward alleviating human hunger. He reveals that he assumed human form to guide Kanji towards demonstrating that the divine exists within all living creatures, rather than in structures of stone.

Kanji learns that the court has ruled in his favor, ordering the religious organizations to pay massive compensations to all affected plaintiffs. However, in his absence, the public has begun worshiping Kanji himself as a divine entity. Leeladhar, Gopi Maiyya, and Siddheshwar have capitalized on this shift by constructing a lavish temple dedicated to Kanji, accumulating millions in new donations. Krishna reminds Kanji that his role as God is simply to illuminate truth, leaving humanity to exercise its free will. Moved, Kanji rushes to the temple, smashes his own idol, and publicly admonishes the crowd for relying on fraudulent godmen who turn faith into a business. He urges them to seek the divine within themselves and each other. After dispersing the crowd, Kanji turns to thank Krishna, only to find that he and his motorcycle have vanished. Reunited with his returning family, Kanji spots Krishna's flute keychain on the ground. As he prepares to pocket it, he hears Krishna’s voice warning him that clinging to religious relics and fear was the very mindset he had just fought to dismantle. Kanji smiles and tosses the object away, watching it disappear into the sky.

== Cast ==
- Akshay Kumar as Krishna Vasudev Yadav
- Paresh Rawal as Kanji Lalji Mehta
- Mithun Chakraborty as Leeladhar Swamy
- Om Puri as Advocate Hanif Qureshi
- Mahesh Manjrekar as Advocate Sardesai
- Govind Namdev as Siddheshwar Maharaj
- Murali Sharma as Laxman Mishra
- Nikhil Ratnaparkhi as Mahadev; Kanji's employee
- Lubna Salim as Susheela Mehta (Kanji's wife)
- Poonam Jhawer as Gopi Maiyya
- Yousuf Hussain Khan as Judge
- Jaineeraj Rajpurohit as Dinesh Gandhi, Chief Regional Manager of Saral Jeevan Insurance Company
- Nidhi Subbaiah as Shweta Tiwari (news reporter)
- Apoorva Arora as Jigna Mehta (Kanji and Susheela's daughter)
- Azaan Rustam Shah as Chintu Mehta (Kanji and Susheela's son)
- Honey Chhaya as Jagdeesh
- Krunal Pandit as Praveen
- Bhakti Ratnaparkhi as Mangala (Mahadev's wife)
- Arun Bali as a sage
- Pradeep Vengurlekar as Pujari
- Kukul Taramaster as Mishra's right-hand man
- Nilesh Pandya as the Bhajan singer
- Pravin Naik as Besaniya
- Puja Gupta as Hanif's daughter
- Suneel Chauhan as Aslam
- Shashi Omprakash Sati as Aslam's sister
- Manju Vyas as Sardesai's assistant
- Tisca Chopra as the interview host
- Prabhu Deva in a special appearance in the song "Go Go Go Govinda"
- Sonakshi Sinha in a special appearance in the song "Go Go Go Govinda"

== Production ==
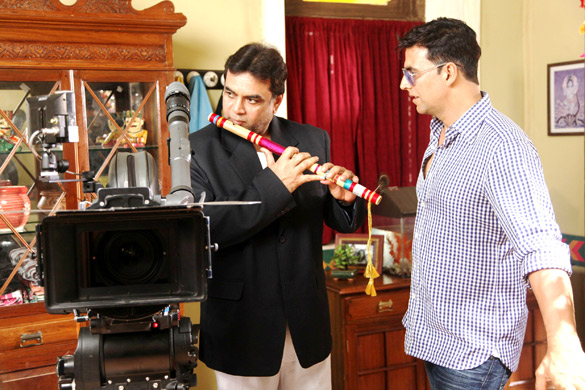
Rawal on the sets with actor Akshay Kumar

Producer Akshay Kumar announced the film in 2012. Paresh Rawal who appeared in the original play Kishen vs Kanhaiya was cast in the lead role with Akshay Kumar playing the role of Krishna in the film. Mithun Chakraborty played a supporting role in the film. The filming was reported to have begun in January 2012. Director Prabhu Deva appeared in an item number along with Sonakshi Sinha.

== Soundtrack ==
OMG – Oh My God!

Soundtrack album by Himesh Reshammiya, Sachin–Jigar and Meet Bros Anjjan
- Released: 12 September 2012
- Recorded: 2012
- Venue: Mumbai
- Genre: Feature film soundtrack
- Label: T-Series
- Producers: Himesh Reshammiya; Sachin–Jigar; Meet Bros Anjjan

Himesh Reshammiya, Sachin–Jigar and Meet Bros Anjjan chronology
Son of Sardaar (2012)	OMG – Oh My God! (2012)	Bol Bachchan (2012)

The soundtrack of OMG – Oh My God! was composed by Himesh Reshammiya, Sachin–Jigar and Meet Bros Anjjan whilst the lyrics were penned by Shabbir Ahmed, Kumaar, Swanand Kirkire and Subrat Sinha. The album features vocals by Reshammiya, Shreya Ghoshal, Kailash Kher, Benny Dayal, Ash King, Suraj Jagan, Keerthi Sagathia, Zubeen Garg, Meet Bros Anjjan, Arya Acharya, Mohammed Irfan, Aman Trikha and Parash Nath. The full audio album was launched on 12 September 2012 by T-Series. The song, 'Go Go Go Govinda' is based on the song 'Govinda Aala Re Aala' from Bluff Master (1963), sung by Mohammed Rafi.

No.	Title	Lyrics	Music	Singer(s)	Length
1.	"Don't Worry" (Hey Ram)	Subrat Sinha	Himesh Reshammiya	Himesh Reshammiya, Benny Dayal, Arya Acharya	05:04
2.	"Mere Nishaan"	Kumaar	Meet Bros Anjjan	Kailash Kher, Meet Bros Anjjan	05:00
3.	"Tu Hi Tu"	Shabbir Ahmed	Himesh Reshammiya	Mohammad Irfan	04:07
4.	"Go Go Go Govinda"	Shabbir Ahmed	Himesh Reshammiya	Mika Singh, Shreya Ghoshal	05:06
5.	"Hari Bol"	Swanand Kirkire	Sachin–Jigar	Keerthi Sagathia	04:37
6.	"Tu Hi Tu" (Reprise)	Shabbir Ahmed	Himesh Reshammiya	Suraj Jagan	04:07
7.	"Oh My God" (Title Track)	Sameer Anjaan	Himesh Reshammiya	Zubeen Garg	01:28
8.	"Tu Hi Tu" (Unplugged)	Shabbir Ahmed	Himesh Reshammiya	Ash King	03:09
9.	"Go Go Govinda" (Reprise)	Swanand Kirkire	Himesh Reshammiya	Aman Trikha, Shreya Ghoshal	05:08
10.	"Don't Worry" (Remix by DJ Kiran Kamath)	Shabbir Ahmed	Himesh Reshammiya	Himesh Reshammiya, Benny Dayal, Arya Acharya	03:31
11.	"Tu Hi Tu" (Remix by DJ Kiran Kamath)	Shabbir Ahmed	Himesh Reshammiya	Mohammad Irfan	04:17
12.	"Krishna Theme" (Flute)		Meet Bros Anjjan	Parash Nath and Sunit Kumar	02:07

== Release ==
OMG – Oh My God! released worldwide on 28 September 2012.

== Critical reception ==
OMG received positive critical reviews.

Taran Adarsh of Bollywood Hungama gave the film 3.5 out of 5 stars and wrote that OMG – OH MY GOD! was a "thought-provoking adaptation of a massively successful play. A movie tackling a sensitive and an untouched subject matter, it will find its share of advocates and adversaries, but the social message the movie conveys comes across loud and clear and that's one of the prime reasons why OMG becomes a deserving watch". Sukanya Verma of Rediff rated it 4 out of 5 reviewing "A brave and absorbing blend of satire, fable and fantasy that brings our attention to the misuse and commercialisation of religion". Faisal Saif of Independent Bollywood rated it 4 out of 5 and said "Strongly Recommended. Fearless concept with some Fearless performances".

== Box office ==
The film had a low opening but showed good growth on its 2nd and 3rd day and collected ₹30 million (US$320,000) nett in its opening weekend. Despite a slow start, the film managed to gross collections of ₹357.4 million (US$3.8 million) nett in its first week. The film collected ₹220 million (US$2.4 million) in its second week. The film continued its successful run in its third week and make a total of around ₹725.0 million (US$7.7 million) in three weeks. The film raked another ₹62.4 million (US$670,000) in its fourth week to make a total of ₹782.4 million (US$8.4 million) in four weeks. Overseas, OMG – Oh My God! grossed US$2.5 million in 10 days. At the end of 17 days, OMG – Oh My God! had grossed ₹104.5 million (US$1.1 million).

== Awards ==
OMG – Oh My God! was awarded the Best Hindi Film Award by the Institute for Research and Documentation in Social Sciences (IRDS) during the second IRDS Hindi Film Awards for social concern. The film has won the award for Best Adapted Screenplay at the 60th National Film Awards.

== See also ==
- Bhagavad Gita trial in Russia
- Gopala Gopala (2015 film)
- Religious satire
- Yehi Hai Zindagi
