= Umesh Shukla =

Indian director

- Occupations: Actor, director, writer
- Years active: 1994–present

Umesh Shukla is an Indian actor and director who works in Bollywood films. He is best known for his work in the critically acclaimed comedy drama film Oh My God. He made his directorial debut with UTV Motion Pictures' and Bindass' presentation Dhoondte Reh Jaaoge.

As an actor, he is known for his villain role in Mithun Chakraborty' s Yaar Gaddar where he played the governor and his alter ego Sheila (the governor's wialso acted directed in many Gujarati plays. He is also well known as a director for Gujarati Play (natak), Kanjee Viruddha Kanjee.

== Filmography ==
Year	Movie title	Role	Notes
1994	Yaar Gaddar	Sheila wife Kana's/Bank Chairman Kana	
1996	Khiladiyon Ka Khiladi	Actor	
1997	Zabaan Sambhalke	Actor	Television series
1998	Doli Saja Ke Rakhna	Actor	
1998-2001	Hera Pheri	Chandu Solanki	
2003	Raja Bhaiya	Vicky	
2003	Kucch To Hai	Dialogue writer	
2004	Kis Kis Ki Kismat	Actor	
2005	Bachke Rehna Re Baba	Dialogue, writer, screenplay, story	
2007	Fool N Final	Writer	
2009	Dhoondte Reh Jaaoge	Director, writer, dialogues	
2012	OMG – Oh My God!	Director, screenplay	
2015	Gopala Gopala	Story	Remake of OMG – Oh My God!
2015	All Is Well	Director	
2018	102 Not Out	Director	
2019	Modi: Journey of a Common Man	Director	Web-series
2023	Aankh Micholi	Director	
2025	Heer Express	Director	
2025	Ek Chatur Naar	Director	
