= The Man Who Sued God =

2001 Australian comedy film by Mark Joffe

- Theatrical film poster
- Directed by: Mark Joffe
- Written by: John Clarke; Don Watson; Patrick McCarville
- Produced by: Brian Abel; Irene Dobson; Ben Gannon; Mark Joffe
- Starring: Billy Connolly; Judy Davis; Emily Browning
- Cinematography: Peter James
- Edited by: Peter Barton
- Music by: David Bridie
- Distributed by: Buena Vista International
- Release dates: 25 October 2001 (Australia); 17 January 2002 (New Zealand); 22 March 2003 (United Kingdom)
- Running time: 97 minutes
- Country: Australia
- Language: English
- Box office: A$8.5 million

The Man Who Sued God is a 2001 Australian comedy film starring Billy Connolly and Judy Davis, and directed by Mark Joffe. The film was a financial success, debuting at number one at the Australian box office in the week of its launch.

== Plot ==
Advocate Steve Myers (Billy Connolly) is a disillusioned lawyer who becomes fed-up with the corruption within the judicial system. He quits law, buys a small fishing boat and takes up fishing for a living.

Steve's fishing boat is struck by lightning and explodes into pieces, burns and sinks. He informs his insurance company, which reviews and then subsequently declines his claim on the grounds that it is not liable as his fishing boat was destroyed due to an "act of God".

Frustrated that his claim is repeatedly declined, Steve files a claim against God, naming religious officials (Christian, Jewish, Muslim, etc) as representatives of God and thereby the respondents. The religious leaders, their respective lawyers and their insurance companies get together to find a way to settle this dilemma, which catches the fancy of the media.

It is in court that God's representatives will have to admit that the destruction of Steve's fishing boat was actually God's act, accept and compensate him, or deny it altogether thereby denying God's existence, leaving the onus on Steve to prove his claim.

Steve's battle brings media attention leading to a meeting with journalist Anna Redmond (Judy Davis) who helps to raise his public profile, enlisting the support of others who had fallen victim to insurance companies' "acts of God" clause. He also faces heavy criticism and protests from religious groups as his profile grows, and he backs the church into a disadvantageous position.

However, the attention takes its toll on Steve's family, who are exploited by the media, his ex-wife already crippled by debt as the guarantor of the boat. Steve faces a reality check as his family considers moving to Perth, on the other side of the country.

Meanwhile, Anna Redmond comes under fire for a history of disputes and attacks on insurance companies, drawing criticism that the case is little more than a publicity stunt. Facing a drawn out legal battle and the impact it would have on those around him, Steve decides he has won a moral victory, and withdraws from the case but not before convincing the judge that insurance companies' use of the term "acts of God" is a misleading term.

== Cast ==
- Billy Connolly as Steve Myers
- Judy Davis as Anna Redmond
- Colin Friels as David Myers
- Wendy Hughes as Jules Myers
- Bille Brown as Gerry Ryan
- John Howard as Edward Piggott
- Emily Browning as Rebecca Myers
- Peter Whitford as Moderator
- Steve Jacobs as Hal
- Ritchie Singer as Sam Cohen
- Lenore Smith as Reporter
- Blair Venn as Les

== Production ==
Outdoor scenes for the film were shot in two weeks during February 2001. Originally producer Ben Gannon had wanted to shoot the scenes around Pittwater north of Sydney, but later settled on the small village of Bermagui, New South Wales on the state's South Coast due to the production values it afforded. Bermagui had been suggested by director Mark Joffe as it was his favourite holiday spot. The fishing boat featured in the film was a charter vessel the 'Tarpin', hired from Bermagui Boat Harbour. Indoor scenes and post-production were located in Sydney.

On 15 February Bob Carr, then Premier of New South Wales visited the set, presenting a cheque for $50,000 to Gannon Films as a grant to offset the cost of filming in a regional location. The two-week shoot brought an estimated $250,000 to the local economy.

== Reception ==
=== Commercial ===
The Man Who Sued God made a debut at number one on its opening weekend with a A$1.1 million box office. Within Australia, it earned $8.1 million by the end of that year and ultimately grossed A$8,546,867.

=== Critical ===
Review aggregate website Rotten Tomatoes gives the film a rating of 71% based on 7 reviews, with an average score of 5.8/10. Jamie Russell of BBC deemed the production was "nicely played by all concerned."

=== Accolades ===
John Clarke and Don Watson were nominated for Best Original Screenplay at the 44th Australian Film Institute Awards.

== Remakes ==
In 2014, New Films International hired Larry Charles to write a remake of the film. However, the remake has yet to be produced.

The producers licensed the right to remake the film in Hindi for release in India. OMG – Oh My God!, based on the original premise of The Man Who Sued God, with an Indian story and a quite different plotline and altered climax, was released in 2012. OMG was a box office hit in India, and was critically acclaimed.

A remake, Frank vs. God, starring Henry Ian Cusick, was released in 2016.

== See also ==
- Cinema of Australia
- Lawsuits against God
