= Moonwater Pictures =

- Company type: Film producer, Film distributor
- Industry: Entertainment, Motion pictures
- Founded: 2008
- Headquarters: Hyderabad, Telangana, India
- Key people: Mahi V Raghav
- Products: Film Production; Film Distribution
- Owner: Mahi V Raghav; Rakesh Mahankali; Pavan Kumar Reddy
- Website: www.moonwaterpictures.in

The Moonwater pictures is a movie production house based out of Hyderabad, Telangana. The production house was founded in 2008 by Mahi V Raghav, Rakesh Mahankali and Pavan Kumar Reddy. It has produced and distributed three films so far, and all were highly successful at the box office and received good responses from critics.

== History ==
Villagelo Vinayakudu was the first feature film produced under this banner, followed by Kudirithe Kappu Coffee and Paathshala. Paatshala is considered as one of the new age Telugu film and appreciated well by critics. Paathshala successfully marks an innovative edge, in the Telugu film industry, in terms of selection procedure wherein the cast and crew would be finalised through the medium of social networking site, 'Facebook'. The contest hosted on Facebook managed to get more than 15,000 followers within seven days of the launch with 10,000 applicants.

== Film production ==
No	Year	Film	Actors	Director	Language	Notes
1	2009	Villagelo Vinayakudu	Krishnudu, Saranya Mohan, Rao Ramesh, Yandamuri Veerendranath	Sai Kiran Adivi	Telugu	Story of Villagelo Vinayakudu is done by producer Mahi V Raghav himself
2	2011	Kudirithe Kappu Coffee	Varun Sandesh, Suma Bhattacharya, Bhimaneni Srinivasa Rao, Sukumari, Tanikella Bharani	Ramana Salva	Telugu	jointly Produced along with Shiva Meka under the banner of Shiva Productions
3	2014	Paathshala	Nandu, Shashank, Sirisha, Anu Priya	Mahi V Raghav	Telugu	Mahi V Raghav makes his directorial debut in Telugu through the film.

== Awards ==
S.no	Ceremony	Year	Category	Movie	Result
1	1st IIFA Utsavam	2015	IIFA UTSAVAM Award for Best Director	Paathshala	Nominated
2	1st IIFA Utsavam	2015	IIFA UTSAVAM Award for Best Picture	Paathshala	Nominated
