= Mahi V Raghav =

Indian film director

Mahi V. Raghav
- Born: India
- Occupations: Film director, screenwriter and film producer
- Years active: 2009 – Present
- Political party: YSR Congress Party

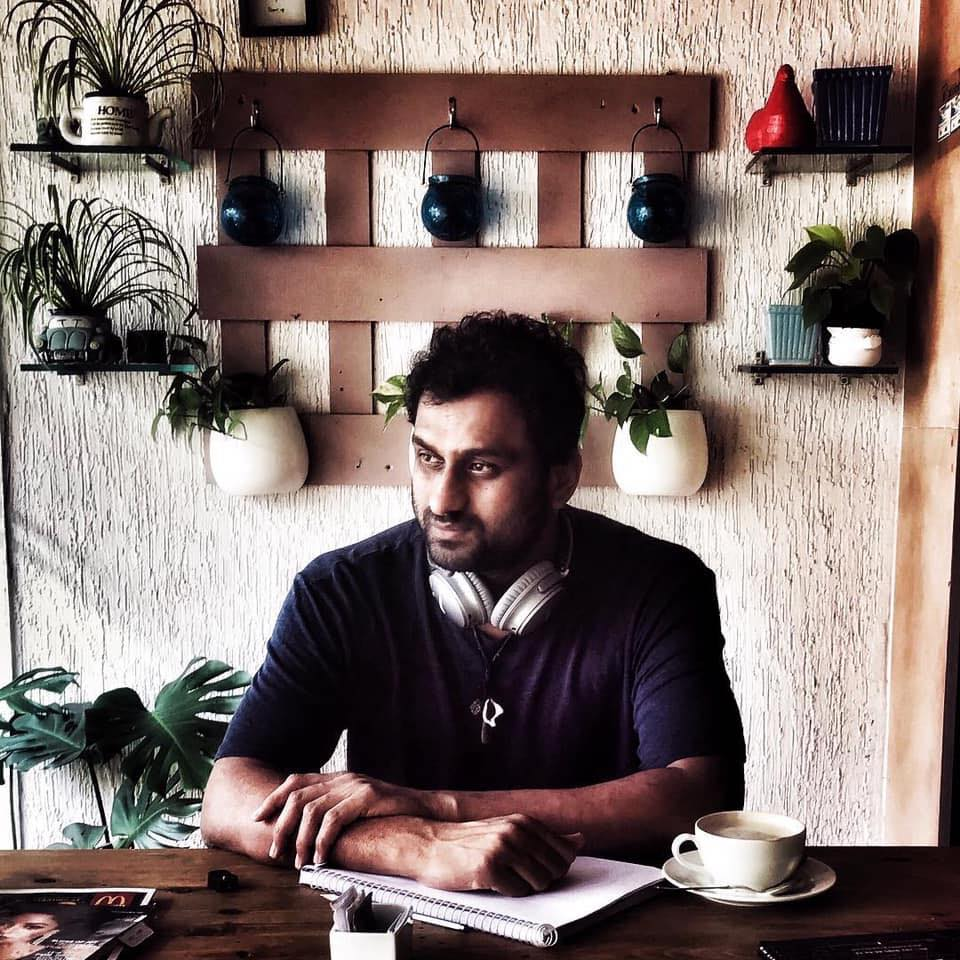
Mahi Raghav

Mahi V. Raghav is an Indian film maker, screenwriter and producer known for his works in Telugu cinema. He is notable for directing Anando Brahma, a comedy horror and Yatra, a biopic of YS Raja Sekhar Reddy, late CM of Andhra Pradesh.

He started his film career as a producer and went on to become a screenwriter and director with the films Pathasala, Anando Brahma and Yatra.

== Early life ==
Mahi is an MBA graduate from Madras University. Before getting into the film industry, he has taken up multiple jobs in the UK and New Zealand. After returning to India in 2008, he assisted Sai Kiran Adivi in Vinayakudu, the film that also started his career as a producer in the film industry.

== Film career ==
Raghav began his career as a producer for Villagelo Vinayakudu, with Moonwater Pictures. The production house funded three films altogether. In 2014, he wrote and directed the third film of production company, Pathasala.

After the critically acclaimed Pathasala, he directed the comedy horror, Anando Brahma, with Taapsee Pannu, Vennela Kishore, and Shakalaka Shankar in 2017. Bankrolled by 70mm Entertainments, it broke all the clichés of horror comedies and did well at the box office. The success of the film led it to being remade as Petromax in Tamil and Mane Maratakkide in Kannada.

In 2019, he made Yatra, the biographical film of the late Chief Minister of Andhra Pradesh, Y. S. Rajasekhara Reddy, under 70mm Entertainments and Three Autumn Leaves. Mammootty enacted the role of Reddy, with the plot based on real incidents that led him to conduct his famous Padhayatra, which later made him the Chief Minister of Andhra Pradesh in 2004. The phrase Nenu vinnanu, Nenu unnanu, written by Raghav, was used as a campaign slogan by the YSR Congress Party, during the 2019 Andhra Pradesh Legislative Assembly elections. It also has been titled to the book written on the political campaigns of Y. S. Jaganmohan Reddy, the current Chief Minister of Andhra Pradesh. With Yatra, Raghav announced his new production house, Three Autumn Leaves.

In 2023, he made his foray into OTT content for Disney+Hotstar. He was the showrunner for Save the Tigers, a family drama starring Priyadarshi Pulikonda, Chaitanya Krishna, and Abhinav Gomatam in the lead roles. It received positive reviews from both the critics and audience, alike. His second series as a showrunner, Shaitan, was a crime thriller that starred Rishi, Jaffer Sadiq, Devayani Sharma, Shelly Kishore, and Ravi Kale in the lead roles. It received mixed reviews from both the critics and audience, alike. It gained notoriety for the glorification of violence, profanity, and sexual content.

In 2024, he released the sequel to the disney plus hotstar original Save The Tigers 2

He also announced a feature film Sidda Lokam Ela Undhi Nayana. This is a social satire starring Shraddha Srinath in the lead role along with a range of supporting actors. It is titled as Sidda Lokam Ela Undhi Nayana.

== Filmography ==
=== Films ===
Year	Title	Credits		
Year	Title	Director	Producer	Writer
2009	Villagelo Vinayakudu	No	Yes	No
2011	Kudirithe Kappu Coffee	No	Yes	No
2014	Paathasala	Yes	No	Yes
2017	Anando Brahma	Yes	No	Yes
2019	Petromax	No	No	Yes
2019	Yatra	Yes	No	Yes
2024	Yatra 2	Yes	Yes	Yes

=== Television ===
Year	Title	Director	Producer	Writer	Streaming platform
2023–present	Save the Tigers	No	Yes	Yes	Disney+ Hotstar
2023	Shaitan	Yes	Yes	Yes	Disney+ Hotstar

== Awards and nominations ==
Year	Award	Category	Film	Result	Ref.
2016	1st IIFA Utsavam	Best Direction	Paathasala	Nominated	
2018	7th South Indian International Movie Awards	Best Debut Director	Anando Brahma	Nominated	
