= Nandi Awards of 2008 =

Indian Telugu film and TV awards ceremony

The Nandi Awards are presented annually in Andhra Pradesh, For Telugu cinema by State government. "Nandi" means "bull", the awards being named after the big granite bull at Lepakshi — a cultural and historical symbol of Andhra Pradesh. Nandi Awards are presented in four categories: Gold, Silver, Bronze, and Copper.

The Nandi awards for the year 2008 were announced on 24 October 2009 at Hyderabad.

== Nandi Awards 2008 Winners List ==
| Category | Winner | Film |
|---|---|---|
| Best Feature Film | Saibabu Jagarlamudi | Gamyam |
| Second Best Feature Film | Prem Patra | Vinayakudu |
| Third Best Feature Film | Dil Raju | Parugu |
| Nandi Award - Akkineni Award for best home-viewing feature film | Ram Mohan | Ashta Chamma |
| Best Popular Film for Providing Wholesome Entertainment | Sravanthi Ravi Kishore | Ready |
| Sarojini Devi Award for a Film on National Integration | Nandireddy Narasimha Reddy | 1940 Lo Oka Gramam |
| Best Children's Film | - | - |
| Second Best Children's Film | PHVSN Babji, P Balachandra Reddy | Durgi |
| Best Documentary Film | - | - |
| Second Best Documentary Film | Commissioner of Social Welfare Department, AP | Memu Manushulame |
| First best educational film | - | - |
| Second best educational film | Alla Rambabu | Adavi Naa Thalliro |
| Best Actor | Ravi Teja | Neninthe |
| Best Actress | Swathi Reddy | Ashta Chamma |
| Best Supporting Actor | Allari Naresh | Gamyam |
| Best Supporting Actress | Raksha | Nachavule |
| Best Character Actor (Gummadi Award) | Mukkuraju | 1940 Lo Oka Gramam |
| Best Villain | Sonu Sood | Arundhati |
| Best Male Comedian (Allu Award) | Brahmanandam | Ready |
| Best Female Comedian | - | - |
| Best Child Actor | Bharath | Ready |
| Best Child Actress | Divya Nagesh | Arundhati |
| Best Director | Sai Kiran Adivi | Vinayakudu |
| Best Screenplay Writer | A. Karunakaran | Ullasamga Utsahamga |
| Best First Film of a Director | Sai Kiran Adivi | Vinayakudu |
| Best Director for a Children's Film | - | - |
| Best Music Director | Mickey J. Meyer | Kotha Bangaru Lokam |
| Best Male Playback Singer | Shankar Mahadevan | Venkatadri |
| Best Female Playback Singer | Geeta Madhuri | Nachavule |
| Best Lyricist | Sirivennela Seetharama Sastry | Gamyam (Enthavaraku) |
| Best Story Writer | R. P. Patnaik | Andamaina Manasulo |
| Best Dialogue Writer | Puri Jagannadh | Neninthe |
| Best Cinematographer | Chota K. Naidu | Kotha Bangaru Lokam |
| Best Editor | Marthand K. Venkatesh | Arundhati |
| Best Art Director | Ashok | Arundhati |
| Best Choreographer | Prem Rakshith | Kantri |
| Best Male Dubbing Artist | P. Ravi Shankar | Arundhati |
| Best Female Dubbing Artist | R Haritha | Nachavule |
| Best Makeup Artist | Ramesh Mahanti | Arundhati |
| Best Fight Master | Ram Lakshman | Neninthe |
| Best Costume Designer | Deepa Chandar | Arundhati |
| Best Audiographer | Madhusudhan Reddy Radhakrishna | Arundhati |
| Best Special Effects | Rahul Nambiar | Arundhati |
| Nandi Award for Best Book on Telugu Cinema(Books, posters, etc.) | Dr. Ramalakshmi Arudra | Arudra Cine Mini Kaburlu (Book) |
| Best Film Critic on Telugu Cinema | Parcha Sarath Kumar | |
| Special Jury Award | Anushka Shetty | Arundhati |
| Special Jury Award | P. Saraswati Rammohan | Bathukamma |
| Special Jury Award | Allu Arjun | Parugu |
| Special Jury Award | Suseela | 1940 Lo Oka Gramam |
