= Kudirithe Kappu Coffee =

- Directed by: Ramana Salva
- Written by: Ramana Salva
- Produced by: Mahi V Raghav; Shiva Meka
- Starring: Varun Sandesh; Suma Bhattacharya
- Cinematography: Santhosh Rai Pathaje
- Edited by: Anil Kumar Bonthu
- Music by: Yogeshwara Sharma
- Distributed by: Shivas Productions; Moonwater Pictures
- Release date: 25 February 2011
- Country: India
- Language: Telugu

Kudirithe Kappu Coffee (transl. Cup of Coffee, If possible...) is a 2011 Telugu-language romance drama film directed by Ramana Salva who has worked as a cinematographer for the movie Village Lo Vinayakudu. Varun Sandesh acts in the lead role along with the debutant actress Suma Bhattacharya in the opposite lead role. Yogeshwara Sharma, who is the son of acclaimed lyricist Sirivennala Seetha Rama Sastry, debuts himself as the music composer for this film.

The film's title is based on a dialogue spoken by Genelia D'Souza in Bommarillu (2006).

== Plot ==
Kudirithe Kappu Coffee is a simple story. Venu (Varun Sandesh), son of Giridhar (Bhimaneni Srinivasa Rao), hates love after his dear friend Ravi commits suicide due to love failure. Lasya (Suma Bhattacharya), a self-confident girl who is pursuing hotel management, is very affectionate towards her granny Malati (Sukumari), who is staying at Dakshinagiri hill station in the AP-Karnataka border. Lasya's dream is to turn her grandmother's coffee shop into a resort and leave along with her soulmate. Incidentally, Giridhar is a student of Malati. Giridhar has a coffee shop in Dakshinagiri, where Malati lives.

Malati is under the impression that it belonged to her son. Once she realizes it is not her property but Giridhar's, she decides to give it back to him. But she also has to repay the loan of Mohan (Tanikella Bharani), operates Decent Lodge in Dakshinagiri who dreams to take over Lasya's coffee shop.

In such conditions, Giridhar sends Venu to take care of Malati and the coffee shop, explaining that he was indebted to the Malati teacher for his upbringing. He bought the coffee shop to live in after his retirement, but after knowing her son and daughter-in-law had died in an accident to provide financial support, he lied to her and told her that the property belonged to her son. Now, after knowing the facts, the self-respected Malati teacher decides to give it back, so Giridhar, who does not like the events, guides his son to make the coffee shop into profits, which are currently at a loss, and makes them accept the coffee shop for themselves. Then, he encourages his son to find a career for himself by making this project successful.

Then Venu enters Malati's house as an unemployed youth with his father's friend Raja Rao's (Sivannarayana Naripeddi) help. Later, he is hired as an event manager by Malati, who decides to use the coffee shop until the debt can be paid off. Later, Venu turns the coffee shop into a wedding venue by getting a contract from David, who owns a school besides his coffee shop, which is now closed. After knowing the events through David's daughter Mary, who is Lasya's best friend, Lasya fears that her coffee shop is being taken over by outsiders. Later, after knowing the facts through her grandmother, she joins with Venu in the business to take over the coffee shop, fair and square, by agreeing to a half-percentage partnership in every deal.

Later, Venu offers tourism packages to corporate companies and gains profits for the coffee shop, but he never reveals his identity to Lasya and her grandmother as per his father's promise. Later, the jealous Mohan tries various ways to lure Venu for shady deals, but he denies the deals and warns him not to enter their matters. Finally vexed, Mohan attempts to murder Venu like an accident, but he escapes with a short edge. Then the angered Raja Rao confronts Mohan and reveals to everyone that he is the actual owner of the coffee shop and his intention for his arrival, making him realize his mistakes. The guilty Mohan apologizes to everyone and leaves the place.

Then Malati understands Giridhar's concern for her and accepts the coffee shop for themselves. Meanwhile, after observing Venu from the beginning, Lasya started liking him and reciprocating her feelings towards him. Then Venu is upset by her advances and decides to maintain distance with her. Later, Lasya gets the facts from Ravi's former girlfriend and tries various ways to propose to him, but Venu doesn't give any response to her. Meanwhile, Malati wishes Lasya to marry Phani, who is her paternal brother-in-law but Lasya is postponing the decision regarding marriage and decides to make a final confrontation with Venu. Mary approaches with the proposal of Lasya and asks about his feelings towards her, then Venu rejects the proposal of Lasya and goes to meet her, finding Lasya shocked after knowing her grandmother is no more, which makes her shattered.

After the final rites of the Malati teacher, the coffee shop has been temporarily handed over to Raja Rao. From then on, Lasya became stubborn and depressed and decided not to follow her dreams anymore. She visited Phani's house but was unable to move on with Venu rejects Phani's proposal and reaches Hyderabad, where she joins as an event manager in one of her friend's star hotels. Meanwhile, Venu becomes confounded by Lasya's actions, feels very sad about the situation, and decides to go to Kolkata to his uncle's house to find a new carrier.

Then Giridhar tries to understand his feelings towards Lasya. Then Venu realizes he loves her so much later that he meets her and apologizes for his foolish actions towards her. The film ends with Lasya having a cup of coffee in her coffee shop, a fulfilling dream of hers with Venu, now her husband.

== Cast ==
- Varun Sandesh as Venu
- Suma Bhattacharya as Lasya
- Bhimaneni Srinivasa Rao as Giridhar
- Sukumari as Malati
- Tanikella Bharani as Mohan
- Sivannarayana Naripeddi as Raja Rao
- Shakalaka Shankar as Koti
- Prudhvi Raj as Company MD

== Soundtrack ==
Kudirithe Kappu Coffee

Soundtrack album to Kudirithe Kappu Coffee by Yogeshwara Sharma
- Released: 20 December 2010
- Recorded: 2010
- Genre: Feature film soundtrack
- Language: Telugu
- Label: Aditya Music
- Producer: Yogeshwara Sharma

Malayalam composer Rahul Raj was initially approached for composing the music, but he turned down the offer due to scheduling issues. Later Yogeshwara Sharma, son of veteran lyricist Sirivennela Sitaramasastri was roped in to compose the music. The music of Kudirithe Kappu Coffee was launched at a function arranged in Club Jayabheri on the night of 20 December 2010. This launch event was attended by M. M. Keeravani, Nimmagadda Prasad, Tammareddy Bharadwaja, Dil Raju, Varun Sandesh, Allari Naresh, Nani, Tanish, Sanjjanaa, Vamsi Krishna, R. P. Patnaik, Rajasimha, Abburi Ravi, Bhimaneni Srinivasa Rao, Daggubati Suresh Babu, C Kalyan, Sai Kumar Adivi, ES Maurthy etc. The lyrics of all the songs were penned by Sirivennela Sitaramasastri.

No.	Title	Artist(s)	Length
1.	"Srikaram"	S. P. Balasubrahmanyam	03:42
2.	"Edo Edo"	Ranjith	03:48
3.	"Athadilo Edo"	Hamsika Iyer	03:58
4.	"Anaga Anaga"	M. M. Keeravani	04:01
5.	"Andarlaga"	KS Chithra	04:22
Total length:			19:51

== Reception ==
Jeevi of idlebrain.com gave a review stating "Kudirithe Kappu Coffee is a simple film with a predictable story line. The plus points are visuals, music and awesome locations. Lack of dramatic impact and hurried-up climax are the weak points. I wish the director would have executed the script with better emotional impact. On a whole, Kudirithe Kappu Coffee is a typical multiplex film with nice visuals/music". Y. Sunitha Chowdary of cinegoer.com gave a review stating "Kudirithe Kappu Coffee is a strictly okay movie.if you understand why Coffee figures in the story. For those who aren't coffee lovers you won't have much to do with this film, as you don't get what you've been promised..a story and a movement i.e., a katha and a kadhalika." Rediff.com gave a review stating "Verdant and picturesque locales, good cinematography, sonorous music and a pleasant love story written and directed well by Ramana Salwa makes Telugu film Kudirithe Kappu Coffee refreshing and pleasant. This love story is yet another addition to the umpteen ones seen on screen but its good treatment has made it a nice watch. Yet, one feels a sense of incompleteness and the lack of a cohesive narrative". supergoodmovies.com gave a review stating "Kudirithe Kappu Coffee will appeal to people who are patient enough to bear it and who has an open mind to analyze and summarize it. Rest of them could safely stay away from it". Sify.com gave a review stating "The movie might appeal to the A Class audiences, and might be liked by those who give priority to music and landscapes."
