= Esha Chawla =

Indian actress

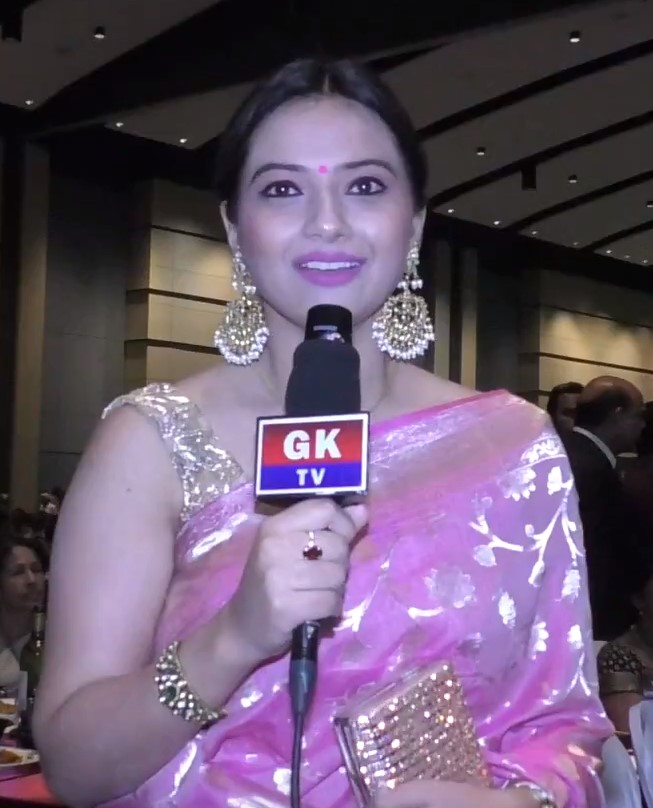
- Chawla in 2018
- Born: 6 March 1988 (age 38); Delhi, India
- Occupation: Actress
- Years active: 2011–2016, 2025-present

Esha Chawla (born 6 March 1988) is an Indian actress who has primarily appeared in Telugu-language films. She made her debut with Prema Kavali (2011).

== Early life ==
Chawla was born on 6 March 1988 in Delhi. She graduated in Political Science and joined a theatre group in Mumbai to pursue a career in acting.

== Career ==
Chawla made her film debut with Prema Kavali opposite debutant Aadi under K. Vijaya Bhaskar's direction. In 2016, Chawla worked on M. S. Raju's Rambha Urvasi Menaka starring Trisha and Nikesha Patel; however, the film was later shelved.

== Filmography ==
- Note: all films are in Telugu, unless otherwise noted.

Year	Title	Role	Notes	Ref.
2011	Prema Kavali	Prema	CineMAA Award for Most Promising Face – won	
2012	Poola Rangadu	Anita		
2012	Srimannarayana	Bhanu		
2013	Mr. Pellikoduku	Anjali		
2014	Jump Jilani	Madhavi		
2016	Viraat	Preethi	Kannada film	
2025	Divya Drusthi			
2026	Cheekatilo	Anandita		
2026	Vishwambhara †	TBA	Filming	
