= Operation Gold Fish =

2019 Telugu action film by Sai Kiran Adivi

- Theatrical release poster
- Directed by: Sai Kiran Adivi
- Written by: Sai Kiran Adivi
- Produced by: Prathiba Adivi; Padmanabha Reddy; Ashish Reddy; Keshav Swaroop; Garry BH; Satsh Degala
- Starring: Aadi; Nithya Naresh; Sasha Chettri; Karthik Raju; Aashu mahantam Raju; Krishnudu; Abburi Ravi; Manoj Nandam
- Cinematography: Jaipal Reddy
- Edited by: Garry BH
- Music by: Sricharan Pakala
- Production company: Vinayakudu Talkies
- Release date: 18 October 2019
- Running time: 126 minutes
- Country: India
- Language: Telugu

Operation Gold Fish is a 2019 Indian Telugu-language action thriller film written and directed by Sai Kiran Adivi and produced by Vinayakudu Talkies, U&I Entertainments. The story is inspired by true events of mass exodus of Kashmiri Pandits from the valley in the 1990s. The film starring Aadi as an NSG commando, Nithya Naresh, Sasha Chhetri, Karthik Raju and Parvateesam, has Abburi Ravi, the Telugu writer, as the antagonist. The patriotic thriller has Aadi playing an NSG commando.

With the abrogation of Article 370 in Jammu and Kashmir, the script has been changed to suit the current scenario, and new scenes were shot reflecting the aspirations of Kashmiri Pandits. The film was released on 18 October 2019. This movie got mixed reviews from critics and was also a box-office bomb.

== Cast ==
- Aadi as NSG team commander Arjun Pandit
- Nithya Naresh as Nithya Sharma (Minister Sharma's daughter)
- Karthik Raju as Karthik Raju
- Sasha Chettri as Tanya (Karthik's love interest)
- Parvateesam as Solemn (Karthik's friend)
- Anish Kuruvilla as Anish Kuruvilla, NIA Officer
- Rao Ramesh as Mr. S.K. Sharma (External Affair's Minister)
- Abburi Ravi as Ghazi Baba, Terrorist leader
- Manoj Nandam as Farooq Iqbal Iraqi, Terrorist
- Keertana Allamraju
- Krishnudu as Watchman
- Ramajogayya Sastry as Solemn's father
- Srini Dhanala as Srini Pillai (Hacker)

== Production ==
The film was shot in various locations, including Araku, Lambasingi, Chintapalli, Kashmir, Delhi, Kakinada Port, and Ramoji Film City in Hyderabad.

== Soundtrack ==
Operation Gold Fish

Soundtrack album by Sricharan Pakala
- Released: 9 September 2019
- Recorded: 2019
- Studio: Studio 102, Melody Sstudio
- Genre: Soundtrack
- Length: 7:53
- Label: Aditya Music

Sricharan Pakala chronology
Chanakya (2019)	Operation Gold Fish (2019)	Aswathama (2020)

The soundtrack of the film is composed by Sricharan Pakala and lyrics by Ramajogayya Sastry.

Track list
No.	Title	Singer(s)	Length
1.	"Paluke Bangarama"	Yamini Ghantasala	2:33
2.	"Mahatma"	M. M. Keeravani	2:39
3.	"Friendship Song"	Sricharan Pakala, Nithya Naresh	2:41
Total length:			7:53

== Reception ==
Operation Gold Fish got mixed reviews from critics

A critic from 123telugu.com rated the film 2.75 out of 5 and wrote, "Operation Gold Fish is a passable patriotic drama which has a select few good moments. The setup is good but a disappointing screenplay and unnecessary scenes take away the grip from the proceedings."

Neeshita Nyayapati from The Times of India rated the film 2 out of 5 and wrote, "Operation Gold Fish just ends up being a hot mess that could’ve been handled with a little more sensitivity."
