= 70mm Entertainments =

Indian film production company

- Industry: Entertainment
- Founded: Hyderabad, Telangana in 2015
- Headquarters: Hyderabad, Telangana, India
- Key people: Vijay Chilla; Shashi Devireddy
- Products: Films
- Owner: Vijay Chilla; Shashi Devireddy
- Website: 70mmentertainments.com

70mm Entertainments is an Indian film production company established in 2015, which predominantly works in Telugu Cinema.

== History ==
Producers Vijay Chilla and Shashi Devireddy has established this production house in 2015. In the same year, they produced Bhale Manchi Roju, a crime comedy starring Sudheer Babu, Wamiqa Gabbi and Sai Kumar. Bhale Manchi Roju did well at the box-office and also received good reviews from critics.

Later in 2017, they were back after a year with Anando Brahma a comedy horror. Despite being a Small-Budget Movie did exceptionally well grossing around ₹15 crore and made it to the list of hits in 2017.

They teamed up for the second time with Mahi V Raghav for the biopic of former Chief Minister of Andhra Pradesh Y. S. Rajasekhara Reddy titled as Yatra.

== Film production ==
No	Year	Film	Language	Actors
1	2015	Bhale Manchi Roju	Telugu	Sudheer Babu, Wamiqa Gabbi
2	2017	Anando Brahma	Telugu	Taapsee Pannu, Srinivas Reddy, Vennela Kishore
3	2019	Yatra	Telugu	Mammootty
4	2021	Sridevi Soda Center	Telugu	Sudheer Babu, Anandhi
5	TBA	Power Peta	Telugu, Tamil	Sundeep Kishan
6	TBA	TBD (Gopichand 34)	Telugu	Gopichand, Anarkali Nazar
