= Shanmukha (film) =

2025 Indian Telugu-language film by Shanmugam Sappani

- Theatrical release poster
- Directed by: Shanmugam Sappani
- Screenplay by: Shanmugam Sappani
- Story by: Satish Aketi
- Produced by: Tulasi Ram Sappani; Shanmugam Sappani; Ramesh Yadav
- Starring: Aadi Saikumar; Avika Gor
- Cinematography: RR Vishnu; Krishna Murali
- Edited by: M. A. Malik
- Music by: Ravi Basrur
- Production company: Sapbro Productions
- Release date: 21 March 2025
- Running time: 121 minutes
- Country: India
- Language: Telugu

Shanmukha is a 2025 Indian Telugu-language crime thriller film co-written and directed by Shanmugam Sappani. The film features Aadi Saikumar and Avika Gor in lead roles.

The film was released on 21 March 2025.

== Plot ==
The story begins in a secluded, forest-adjacent village where a local man named Viganda (Chirag Jani) and his wife celebrate the birth of their son. However, their joy quickly turns to horror and despair when they realize the baby has a rare, shocking deformity: he is born with six distinct faces, resembling the deity Shanmukha. Fearing social ostracization and the villagers' cruel superstitious reactions, Viganda hides the child away. Desperate to find a "cure" and transform his son's monstrous appearance into a normal child, Viganda travels to Varanasi to study dark magic and Kshudra Pooja (black magic). Upon returning, a powerful occult sorcerer gives him a gruesome prescription: to collapse the six faces into one, Viganda must perform human sacrifices of six beautiful young women, each born under a different, specific nakshatra (astrological star sign).

A horrific pattern begins as Viganda, aided by his loyal brother-in-law, starts abducting young women from nearby areas to systematically murder them in sacrificial rituals deep within the forest. Mysteriously, shortly after each girl vanishes, her respective boyfriend is driven to a bizarre, sudden suicide—a pattern designed to cover up the tracks of the kidnappings. Meanwhile, in Hyderabad, Karthi Vallabhan (Aadi Saikumar) is a reckless but highly capable Sub-Inspector who lands himself in hot water with his superiors after losing his service weapon during a high-stakes drug bust. He is given a tight one-week ultimatum to redeem his career. At the same time, Sara Maheswaran (Avika Gor), a determined journalism and research student from Bengaluru, arrives in town. Sara has spent years researching a string of unresolved missing-women cases and spots the horrific, recurring link between the disappearances and the boyfriends' suicides. She approaches Karthi—who happens to be her ex-boyfriend—pleading for his help to investigate further.

Initially dismissive of Sara's wild conspiracy theories, Karthi is forced to pay attention when his own unofficial investigation yields chilling evidence that matches her data. Together, Karthi and Sara begin tracking the locations of the abductions. As they edge closer to the truth, the film shifts from a standard crime investigation into a deeply unsettling thriller filled with supernatural undertones and ancient lore. Karthi's search leads him straight toward the dense, uncharted forest where Viganda's occult temple is hidden. Every step into the woods brings them face-to-face with local superstitions, terrifying traps, and the realization that the kidnapper is not a typical human trafficker, but a fanatical father driven mad by blind faith.

The climax of the film builds to a frantic race against time. Viganda is preparing for the ultimate, final ritual—which requires a sixth sacrifice and the mythical "blood of Goddess Klin Klara"—to complete his son's transformation. In a high-stakes, action-packed confrontation amid fire, chanting, and dark symbols, Karthi breaches the sacred sacrificial ground. In the ensuing chaos, Karthi manages to overpower Viganda and halt the ceremony. However, the victory is bittersweet. The boy Shanmukha walks into fire and God Shanmukhan (God Subramanian) rises from the fire. This film serves as a heartbreaking testament to the devastating cost of superstition and maternal/paternal obsession.

== Cast ==
- Aadi Saikumar as Karthi Vallabhan
- Avika Gor as Sara Maheswaran
- Aditya Om as Kamal
- Chirag Jani as Viganda
- Master Manu Sappani
- Manoj Nandam as Koushik
- Veera Shankar
- Krishnudu as Subrahmanyam
- Ariyana Glory
- Meena Vasu
- C. V. L. Narasimha Rao
- Madhurima
- Mukhtar Khan
- Raghu
- Pandu as Srikanth
- Chitram Srinu
- Veerabhadram
- Jabardasth Dorababu
- Shanmugam Sappani

== Music ==
All music is composed by Ravi Basrur.

No.	Title	Lyrics	Singer(s)	Length
1.	"Oo Chandrakala"	Santhosh Venky	Santhosh Venky	3:26
2.	"Title Track"	Santhosh Venky	Santhosh Venky, Ravi Basrur	3:02

== Release and reception ==
Shanmukha was released on 21 March 2025.

Avad Mohammad of OTTPlay rated the film 2.5 out of 5 and wrote that "Shanmukha has a very interesting subject and decent thrills. But the confusing screenplay in the second half makes things a bit dull for the audience". Eenadu too praised the story and climax scenes while opining that the screenplay is negative aspect of the film. Andhra Jyothi was critical of the screenplay and the direction.
