= Prema Kavali =

- First Look Poster
- Directed by: K. Vijaya Bhaskar
- Written by: K. Vijaya Bhaskar
- Produced by: K. Atchi Reddy
- Starring: Aadi; Isha Chawla
- Cinematography: Chota K. Naidu
- Edited by: Gautham Raju
- Music by: Anup Rubens
- Production company: Max India Productions
- Release date: 25 February 2011
- Running time: 166 minutes
- Country: India
- Language: Telugu
- Box office: ₹13.7 crore distributors' share

Prema Kavali (transl. I want Love) is a 2011 Telugu-language romantic action comedy film written and directed by K. Vijaya Bhaskar and produced by K. Atchi Reddy. The film features debutants Aadi and Isha Chawla in lead roles. It features music composed by Anup Rubens with cinematography by Chota K. Naidu.

Aadi has won the Hyderabad Times award 2011 for Promising Newcomer Male, CineMAA Awards (2012) for Best Debut Actor of 2012, 59th Filmfare Awards South for Best Male Debut - South, and SIIMA Award for Best Male Debut (Telugu) at 1st SIIMA. It ran for 100 days and was declared a Blockbuster.

== Plot ==
Prema (Isha Chawla) is the darling daughter of an honest and strict police officer (Nassar), but she is currently being blackmailed by one person (Shafi). Prema's tension catches the eye of her sister-in-law (Sindhu Tolani), and this reveals a flashback. The story is about Srinu (Aadi), Prema's classmate and his love for her. However, Prema doesn't respond to his love feelings, but becomes friends with him. But in an unexpected situation, Srinu kisses Prema, and this makes her hate Srinu, and that becomes the cause of her worries. Those photos are used by the blackmailer saying that he would mail them to her father. This makes Prema's sister-in-law go to Srinu's Home in Khammam, where Srinu returns from Training of N.C.C. He, after listening to the whole story, vows to solve all the problems and goes to Hyderabad.

Though initially, it becomes difficult for Srinu to investigate, he later appoints a chain snatcher named Chain Raja (Ali) and tells him to follow her and give him updates. Meanwhile, it is revealed to the audience that the actual man behind this blackmail is Tagore (Dev Gill), a dreaded mafia don who wants a terrorist released from the prison on the orders of terrorist groups, whose in-charge is Prema's Father. Then Chain Raja watches Prema carrying a sum of money to an old house where the blackmailer is in disguise. He takes the sum of money, gives the photos, and cleverly gets the password of Prema's father's e-mail ID in which the terrorist's imprisonment details are held. Before Tagore's henchmen would snatch the photos from Prema, Srinu saves her, and they burn the photos.

Later, Prema starts loving Srinu, and Tagore implements an escape plan to make the terrorist get released from the prison. The whole blame is on Prema's father, and he confronts Prema, which makes her confess the truth. Being the person loving her and as an N.C.C. trainee, Srinu dares to chase Tagore and the terrorist. In a fight, Srinu kills Tagore, and the terrorist is sent to police custody. Later, Srinu goes to the place where he kissed Prema and finds her waiting for him. The film ends with a scene featuring Srinu and Prema confessing their love for each other.

== Cast ==
- Aadi as Srinivas alias Srinu
- Isha Chawla as Prema
- Dev Gill as Tagore
- Nassar as Prema's Father
- Nagababu as Srinu's Father
- Jayasudha as Srinu's Mother
- Sindhu Tolani as Neeraja, Prema's Sister in law
- Bramhanandam as Serlingam Software Engineer
- Ali as Chain Raja
- Shafi as Appa Rao
- Gundu Sudarshan as a house owner
- Supreeth as Tagore's assassin

== Release ==
The film was theatrically released on 25 February 2011. On 25 October 2024, the film was re release in theaters.

== Soundtrack ==
Prema Kavali

Soundtrack album by Anup Rubens
- Released: 9 January 2011
- Recorded: 2010–2011
- Genre: Feature film soundtrack
- Length: 33:57
- Label: Aditya Music
- Producer: Anup Rubens

Anup Rubens chronology
Nenu Naa Rakshasi (Background Score) (2011)	Prema Kavali (2011)	Kodipunju (2011)

The music of the film was composed by Anup Rubens. The audio was launched by Dasari Narayana Rao at Shilpakala Vedika on 9 January 2011. Actors Jayasudha, Manoj Manchu, Lakshmi Manchu, Sharwanand, Varun Sandesh, Bramhanandam and Sundeep Kishan attended the audio launch. The film unit gave away Rs 10 lakh as a donation to the medical aid of child patients at a cancer hospital. Veteran director S. V. Krishna Reddy launched the brochure of the film. Each song was introduced by an actor and guest who attended the audio launch.

Track-List
No.	Title	Lyrics	Singer(s)	Length
1.	"Dum Dum Dolu Baaje"	Ananta Sriram	Benny Dayal	5:10
2.	"Chirunavve Visirave"	Ananta Sriram	Vijay Prakash	4:04
3.	"Tolakari Chinukai"	Sahithi	Ranjith, Shreya Ghoshal	4:48
4.	"Listen To My Heart"	Bhuvana Chandra, Vanamali	Anuj, Anjana Sowmya	4:12
5.	"Manasanta Mukkalu Chesi"	Ananta Sriram	KK	4:13
6.	"Nuvve Nuvve Naa"	Ramajogayya Sastry	K. S. Chithra, Vijay Prakash	4:22
7.	"Chirunavve Visirave" (Remix)	Ananta Sriram	Vijay Prakash	3:55
8.	"Oh Baby Why Did You Have To Go Away" (English Version of Manasanta Mukkalu Chesi)	Vijay Prakash	Vijay Prakash	4:13
Total length:				33:57
