= Vallavanukkum Vallavan =

- Poster
- Directed by: Vijay Tesingu
- Written by: Vijay Tesingu
- Produced by: N. Ramasamy; Reshmi Simha
- Starring: Bobby Simha; Sshivada; Pooja Devariya
- Cinematography: Padmesh
- Edited by: Vivek Harshan
- Music by: Raghu Dixit
- Production companies: Assault Production; Thenandal Studio Limited
- Release date: 20 January 2023
- Country: India
- Language: Tamil

Vallavanukkum Vallavan (transl. Expert of all experts) is a 2023 Indian Tamil-language action comedy film written and directed by Vijay Tesingu, starring Bobby Simha, Sshivada and Pooja Devariya. It has music composed by Raghu Dixit, editing by Vivek Harshan and cinematography by Padmesh. The film which was announced in 2015 and was completed in 2016, had a delayed release on 20 January 2023.

== Plot ==
Two swindlers, Alexander and Napoleon, convinced that money can resolve all their issues, plan to extort funds from evildoers. However, their troubles escalate when they encounter a crazy police officer.

== Cast ==
- Bobby Simha as Alexander
- Sshivada as Azhagi
- Pooja Devariya as Aandal
- Napoleon as Minister Aalavandhan
- Karunakaran as Napoleon
- Anandaraj as Inspector Poonthamalli
- Appukutty as Bangaru
- Sangili Murugan as Sethu Vinayagam
- Kalairani as Phonex Grandma
- Munnar Ramesh as Sura Peter
- Anthony Daasan as Tholar Karki
- R. K. Vijay Murugan as "Bulb" Paramu
- Gajaraj as Singadurai
- Supergood Subramani as Head Constable
- Sibi Pandian as Jeans

== Production ==
In September 2015, Bobby Simha said that he would produce and act in a venture called Vallavanuku Vallavan and that he had first heard and been impressed with the script in 2013. The film was to mark his first production venture, for which he set up the studio Assault Production, to co-produce the film alongside Sri Thenandal Films. Sshivada and Pooja Devariya were cast as the film's lead actresses during October 2015, while Raghu Dixit, Vivek Harshan and Padmesh were signed on as music composer, editor and cinematographer respectively. Production on the film took place throughout 2016, with the project garnering attention for featuring the actor in multiple roles.

The financial problems of Sri Thenandal Films prompted a long delay in the release of the film. In 2019, it was reported that the fil would be sold to, and released by Libra Productions, but the changes did not lead to the film's release. It eventually was released theatrically in January 2023.

== Soundtrack ==
The soundtrack was composed by Raghu Dixit.

Track listing
No.	Title	Singer(s)	Length
1.	"Oorumunai Orathila"	Anthony Daasan	1:37
2.	"Karakudikke Rani"	Apoorva Sridhar	4:30
3.	"Koluse Sol"	Nakul Abhyankar, Manasi Mahadevan	3:26
4.	"Nallavanukku Nallavanda"	Anthony Daasan	4:34
5.	"Saadhu Mirandal"	Ravishankar	4:18
Total length:			18:25

== Release and reception ==
Despite being completed in 2016, Vallanukkum Vallavan was released on 20 January 2023, seven years after the delay.

Latha Srinivasan of India Today gave a negative review citing "It's an age-old story which looks very 80s and Bobby Simha’s character is not a novelty factor. Though the director has tried to add some elements of comedy along with the con angle, it doesn’t work" and concluded the film "can be given a complete miss". Logesh Balachandran of The Times of India wrote "Vallavanukkum Vallavan would have definitely worked for the audience if it would have released few years ago as planned. But now, having witnessed a lot of films of this genre, it might hardly engage the viewers." Malini Mannath wrote, "The film released after lying in the cans for about six years may not give a stale feel. But it has a script which is weakly etched, the screenplay taking a downslide as the story telling progresses".
