= Paathasala =

- Directed by: Mahi V. Raghav
- Written by: Mahi V. Raghav
- Produced by: Rakesh Mahankali; Pavan Kumar Reddy
- Starring: Nandu; Sai Ronak; Sirisha Vanka; Anupriya Goenka; Hammood
- Cinematography: Sudheer Surendran
- Edited by: Shravan Katikaneni
- Music by: Rahul Raj
- Production company: Moonwater Pictures
- Release date: 10 October 2014
- Country: India
- Language: Telugu
- Budget: ₹2.9 crore

Paathasala (transl. School) is a 2014 Indian Telugu-language film written and directed by Mahi V Raghav. The music for the film was composed by Rahul Raj. It also won the state Gaddar Award for Second Best Feature Film.

== Plot ==
Five friends: Raju, Adi, Sandhya, Surya, and Salma, who have just completed their engineering are at crossroads about their career choices. Also, they realize that the moment has come to leave each other and move into the big, bad world. So, they decide to take one final road trip to each other’s house.

They hire a swanky van, and start their fun filled journey to these villages. On their route, they discover a lot of things they did not know about each other. They also realize what they want to do with their lives. Rest of the story is as to what happens during their visit, and how the harsh realities change their lives upside down. In short, the film is about how the road trip becomes a Paathasala of sorts and prepares them for the big journey called life.

== Cast ==
- Nandu as Raju
- Sai Ronak as Adi
- Hamood as Surya
- Anupriya Goenka as Sandhya
- Sirisha Vanka as Salma
- Sanjay Reddy as Sandhya's father
- Surya as College Principal
- Krishna Bhagavaan as JC Astrologer
- L. B. Sriram as Fat Boy's father
- Narasimha Raju as Surya's father
- Shashank as Karthik (Special appearance)

== Production ==
The film is a road based film and 95% of the film was shot outdoors at Gandikota, the Godavari River, Horsley Hills, Hyderabad and the villages near Kadapa.

== Soundtrack ==
The music for the film was composed by Rahul Raj with lyrics by Sri Mani. In an audio review, a critic from Idlebrain.com wrote, "Paathasala music album is engaging and refreshing". Karthik of Milliblog! wrote, "Rahul does considerably better than his debut here!"

Paathasala

Soundtrack album by Rahul Raj
- Released: 2014
- Producer: Rahul Raj

Rahul Raj chronology
Kadavul Paathi Mirugam Paathi (2014)	Paathasala (2014)	Fireman (2015)

Soundtrack

No.	Title	Performer(s)	Length
1.	"Friendship Anthem"	Sooraj Santhosh, Elvis Don Raja
2.	"Merise Merise"	Rahul Raj
3.	"Sooryodhayam"	Najim Arshad
4.	"Swecha Varsham (Freedom Song)"	Rahul Raj
5.	"Shoonyamai"	Nikhil Mathew

== Reception ==
Jeevi of Idlebrain.com rated the film 3/5 and wrote, "On a whole, Paathshala is a different attempt and is aimed at sensible viewers".

== Awards and nominations ==
Date of ceremony	Award	Category	Recipient(s) and nominee(s)	Result	Ref.
24 & 25 January 2020	1st IIFA Utsavam	Best Film	Paathasala	Nominated	
24 & 25 January 2020	1st IIFA Utsavam	Best Director	Mahi V. Raghav	Nominated	
