= Yatra 2 =

2024 Indian Telugu political drama film by Mahi V. Raghav

- Theatrical release poster
- Directed by: Mahi V. Raghav
- Written by: Mahi V. Raghav
- Produced by: Shiva Meka
- Starring: Mammootty; Jiiva
- Cinematography: R. Madhi
- Edited by: Shravan Katikaneni
- Music by: Santhosh Narayanan
- Production companies: Three Autumn Leaves; V Celluloid
- Release date: 8 February 2024
- Running time: 130 minutes
- Country: India
- Language: Telugu

Yatra 2 is a 2024 Indian Telugu-language biographical political drama film written and directed by Mahi V. Raghav and produced by Shiva Meka. A direct sequel to Yatra (2019), it stars Mammootty, reprising his role of Y. S. Rajasekhar Reddy, while Jiiva plays the role of Y. S. Jagan Mohan Reddy. The film is based on the padayatra of Jagan from 2017 to 2019, representing the YSR Congress Party for the 2019 Andhra Pradesh Legislative Assembly election.

The music was composed by Santhosh Narayanan with cinematography by R. Madhi and editing by Shravan Katikaneni. Yatra 2 was released on 8 February 2024 to mixed to negative reviews.

== Plot ==
The film narrates the events leading up to the rise of Jagan Reddy. After the demise of YS Rajasekhara Reddy, his son Jagan wants to console the people through 'Odarpu Yatra'. While some party members want him to be the next Chief Minister, the party high-command does not approve it. They file cases against Jagan and pressurize him to accept their decision. He disobeys them and launches his own political party. The party high-command and the opposition party join hands to bring him down. He loses the 2014 elections but eventually wins the 2019 elections to become the Chief Minister of Andhra Pradesh.

== Cast ==
- Mammootty as Y. S. Rajasekhara Reddy
- Jiiva as Y. S. Jagan Mohan Reddy
- Mahesh Manjrekar as N. Chandrababu Naidu
- Suzanne Bernert as Sonia Gandhi
- Sachin Khedekar as Ghulam Nabi Azad
- Ketaki Narayan as Y. S. Bharathi
- Ashrita Vemuganti as Y. S. Vijayamma
- Subhalekha Sudhakar as Reddy
- George Maryan as blind man
- Goparaju Vijay as YSRCP member

== Music ==
The music was composed by Santhosh Narayanan.

Track listing
| No. | Title | Lyrics | Singer(s) | Length |
|---|---|---|---|---|
| 1. | "Choodu Nanna" | Bhaskarabhatla Ravi Kumar | Vijaynarain | 4:02 |
| 2. | "Tholi Samaram" | Ramajogayya Sastry | Gowtham Bharadwaj | 3:37 |
| 3. | "Bhaga Bhaga Mande" | Ramajogayya Sastry | Deepak Blue | 3:17 |
| 4. | "Prajasankalpa Yatra" | Ramajogayya Sastry | Kapil Kapilan | 4:31 |
| Total length: | | | | 15:27 |

== Reception ==
The Times of India rated 3/5, writing "Yatra 2 is a thought-provoking exploration of political perseverance and personal resilience. Jiiva's portrayal of YS Jagan Mohan Reddy is powerful, offering a window into the complexities of political leadership and familial legacy. This political drama sheds light on the dynamics of power, and governance, appealing to viewers differently depending on their political affiliations".

Raghu Bandi of The Indian Express rated the film with 1/5 stars and wrote "Yatra 2 is strictly for YSRCP and YS Jagan Mohan Reddy fans. There is not much of politics or biography here. It is just a drumroll supporting Jagan."
