= Padmesh =

- Born: 7 August 1974 (age 51); Thuckalay, Kanyakumari, Tamil Nadu, India
- Occupations: Cinematographer, Director of Photography
- Spouse: M Madhavi

Padmesh is an Indian Tamil film cinematographer. Recipient of several accolades for his work in films such as Eknathji (2019), Padmesh has had the opportunity to explore various aspects of filmmaking, gaining valuable experience along the way. Born in Thuckalay to Marthanda Pillai S and P Kasthuri, Padmesh completed his schooling in Kanyakumari. He holds a B.Sc. degree in Chemistry from S.T. Hindu College in Nagercoil. After earning his degree, he moved to Chennai to pursue his passion for cinema. He later obtained a Diploma in Film Technology from the Tamil Nadu Government M.G.R. Film and Television Institute. Soon after, he began his career as an Assistant Cinematographer, contributing to notable films such as, but not limited to Vasool Raja MBBS (2004), Gemini (2002), Amarkkalam (1999), Attagasam (2004), Parthen Rasithen (2000), and Paarthale Paravasam (2001). His first film as a cinematographer was Murugaa in 2007, after which he went on to work with different directors. Outside of his career, Padmesh is married to M Madhavi and is the father of two children.

== Filmography ==
=== As cinematographer ===
- Murugaa (2007)
- Thiruvanamalai (2008)
- Muran (2011)
- Kochadaiyaan (2014)
- Chithiram Pesuthadi 2 (2019)
- Eknathji (2019)
- Vallavanukkum Vallavan (2023)
- Right (2025)
