= Manoj Nandam =

Indian film actor

- Occupation: Actor
- Years active: 2001–present

Manoj Nandam is an Indian actor working predominantly in Telugu films.

== Career ==
Manoj worked as a child artist in films like Athadu (2005) and Chatrapathi (2005), Manoj Nandam went on to play lead roles in many low-key films. He played pivotal roles in Operation Gold Fish (2019) as a militant and in George Reddy (2019) as a student leader. A critic from Telangana Today wrote that "Manoj Nandam too is impressive with the role of Arjun" in George Reddy.

== Filmography ==
Key
†	Denotes films that have not yet been released

Year	Title	Role	Notes
2001	Nuvvu Leka Nenu Lenu		As a child artist
2001	Little Hearts		As a child artist
2002	Holi		As a child artist
2003	Appudappudu		As a child artist
2003	Ninne Ishtapaddanu		As a child artist
2003	Charminar	Young Nandu	As a child artist
2004	Letha Manasulu		As a child artist
2005	Sankranti	Young Vamsi	As a child artist
2005	Orey Pandu		As a child artist
2005	Athadu	Young Nanda Gopal "Nandu"	As a child artist
2005	Chatrapathi	Young Sivaji	As a child artist
2006	Lakshmi	Adolescent Lakshmi	As a child artist
2007	Munna	Young Munna	As a child artist
2011	Tholisariga		
2012	Oka Romantic Crime Katha		
2013	Prema Prayanam		
2013	Adheelekka		
2014	Ninu Chusaka		
2014	Oka Criminal Prema Katha	Sanjay	
2014	Noothi Lo Kappalu	Nandu	
2015	Youthful Love		
2015	O Cheliya Na Priyasakhiya		
2015	Aloukika		
2015	Dhana Lakshmi Thalupu Thadithe		
2016	Full Guarantee		
2016	Vinura Vema		
2016	Chitram Bhalare Vichitram	Shiva	
2017	Ye Rojaithe Chusano		
2017	Devi Sri Prasad	Prasad	
2017	Hani Hani Ibbani		
2018	Manasainodu		
2018	Veera Bhoga Vasantha Rayalu	Udhav	
2019	Nanna Nenu Aadi		
2019	Operation Gold Fish	Farooq Iqbal Iraqi	
2019	Romantic Criminals		
2019	George Reddy		
2021	Valasa	Rajinikanth	
2021	Blocked		
2021	Kathanika		
2021	Republic	Sub-Inspector Manoj	
2022	Welcome To Tihar College		
2023	Oru Vattam Koodi	Dr. Ben Thelliyil	Malayalam film
2025	Shanmukha	Koushik	
