= Yatra (2019 film) =

2019 Indian Telugu-language biographical film

- Theatrical release poster
- Directed by: Mahi V Raghav
- Written by: Mahi V. Raghav
- Produced by: Vijay Chilla; Shashi Devi Reddy; Shiva Meka (presenter)
- Starring: Mammootty
- Cinematography: Sathyan Sooryan
- Edited by: A. Sreekar Prasad
- Music by: K
- Production company: 70mm Entertainments
- Release date: 8 February 2019
- Running time: 126 minutes
- Country: India
- Language: Telugu
- Budget: ₹12 crore
- Box office: est. ₹14.30 crore

Yatra (transl. Journey), also marketed as YSR: Yatra, is a 2019 Indian Telugu-language biographical political drama film directed by Mahi V Raghav. The film stars Mammootty as Y. S. Rajasekhara Reddy and is based on the padayatra of Reddy, who served as Chief Minister of Andhra Pradesh from May 2004 to June 2009 representing Indian National Congress.

The film is produced by Vijay Chilla, Shashi Devi Reddy under 70mm Entertainments. The music was composed by K with cinematography by Sathyan Sooryan and editing by A. Sreekar Prasad. Principal photography commenced on 20 June 2018 in Hyderabad.

The film was released on 8 February 2019 alongside dubbed versions in Malayalam and Tamil. Despite receiving critical acclaim, the film did not perform well commercially.

== Plot ==
The plot of Yatra unfolds as a retrospective narrative, with Mahi V. Raghav directing the film as a biopic. The story revolves around YSR's ambitious political career, his strong connection with the masses, and his vision for improving the lives of the people of Andhra Pradesh. YSR is depicted as a charismatic and compassionate leader who implemented numerous welfare programs and policies that endeared him to the common people.

The film also delves into the political challenges and obstacles YSR faced during his tenure as the Chief Minister, including his tireless efforts to address issues such as healthcare, education, and the welfare of the underprivileged. Yatra portrays YSR's famous Padayatra, a massive foot journey he undertook across the state to connect with the people and understand their problems better.

The narrative of Yatra takes the audience through YSR's personal and political struggles, his interactions with various individuals, and the pivotal moments that shaped his political career. The film showcases his determination, leadership qualities, and the deep-rooted support he enjoyed from the people.

The climax of the film is centered around the tragic helicopter crash that claimed YSR's life, leaving the entire state in shock and mourning. It highlights the outpouring of grief and the unity of the people as they come together to pay their respects to their beloved leader.

== Cast ==
- Mammootty as Y. S. Rajasekhara Reddy
- Suhasini Maniratnam as Sabitha Indra Reddy
- Jagapathi Babu as Y. S. Raja Reddy
- Ashrita Vemuganti as Y. S. Vijayamma
- Rao Ramesh as K. V. P. Ramachandra Rao
- Anasuya Bharadwaj as Gowru Charitha Reddy
- Sachin Khedekar as Ghulam Nabi Azad
- Posani Krishna Murali as Y. Venkata Rao
- Prudhvi Raj as Sujaya Krishna Ranga Rao
- Vijayachander as Mandipalli Narayana Reddy
- Thalaivasal Vijay as Tulla Devender Goud
- Thotapalli Madhu as V. Hanumantha Rao
- Tarun Dhanrajgir as N. D. Tiwari
- Vinod Kumar Alva as K. Chennakesava Reddy
- Nagineedu as Telapalli Raghavayya
- Nassar as Teacher Venkatappa
- Surya as Doctor
- Dil Ramesh as Veerappa
- Mahesh Achanta as Obulesh
- Sanjay Swaroop as D.C.P.
- Ravi Kale as Henchman
- Chatrapathi Sekhar as Farmer
- Kalyani as Kavitha's mother
- Kalpa Latha

== Soundtrack ==
The music is composed by K, while the lyrics are written by Sirivennela Sitaramasastri. The first single "Samara Shankham" was released on 2 September 2018 on the anniversary of Y. S. Rajasekhara Reddy's death.

Yatra

Soundtrack album by K
- Released: 2019
- Recorded: 2018–2019
- Genre: Feature film soundtrack
- Length: 21:25
- Language: Telugu
- Producer: K

K chronology
London Babulu (2017)	Yatra (2019)

Soundtrack
No.	Title	Lyrics	Singer(s)	Length
1.	"Samara Shankham"	Sirivennela Sitaramasastri	Kaala Bhairava	3:40
2.	"Rajanna Ninnapagalara"	Sirivennela Sitaramasastri	Vandemataram Srinivas	3:21
3.	"Pallello Kala Undhi"	Sirivennela Sitaramasastri	S. P. Balasubrahmanyam	4:00
4.	"Mandhito Patugaa"	Sirivennela Sitaramasastri	Saicharan Bhasakaruni	2:41
5.	"Nee Raka Kosam"	Sirivennela Sitaramasastri	Shankar Mahadevan	4:21
6.	"Maruginava Rajanna"	Penchal Das	Penchal Das	3:22
Total length:				21:25

== Production ==
By early January 2018, the producers Vijay Chilla and Shashi Devireddy under their banner 70MM Entertainments had registered the title Yatra, while director Mahi V. Raghav was at the final phase of scripting.

=== Casting ===
Director Mahi V. Raghav said Mammootty was the first choice to play the role of Y. S. Rajasekhara Reddy, but it took nearly five months to bring him on board. Mammootty's performance in the 1991 film Thalapathi inspired director Mahi V Raghav to cast him in the film. In April 2018, Posani Krishna Murali was chosen to play YSR's personal assistant Sureedu. In May, Marathi actor Sachin Khedekar was selected to play former Chief Minister of Andhra Pradesh N. Bhaskara Rao, while Rao Ramesh was chosen to play K. V. P. Ramachandra Rao, a close associate of Reddy. In June, Suhasini Maniratnam was cast to portray Sabitha Indra Reddy, a sister figure to Reddy and the first woman Home Minister in Andhra Pradesh, while television actress Anasuya Bharadwaj was reported to play a politician from Kurnool district. In July, Jagapathi Babu was selected to feature Y. S. Raja Reddy, YSR's father.

== Release and reception ==
The film was released on 8 February 2019.

=== Critical response ===
Hemanth Kumar of Firstpost gave 3 out of 5 stars stating "Yatra feels like just its title. The route is long and you are moved to tears at times, but without any major twists or turns that leave you in awe of the whole journey". Manoj Kumar R of The Indian Express gave 3 out of 5 stars stating "Beyond politics, Mahi V Raghav film Yatra, starring Mammootty, also works as a decent human drama.". Karthik Kumar of Hindustan Times gave 3 out of 5 stars stating "Mammootty's docudrama is at its best when it focuses on the padayatra, devoid of any major twists and turns that usually leave you in awe". Sify gave 3 out of 5 stars stating "Political movies work more if you have a similar political bent". Venkat Arikatla of Great Andhra gave 3 out of 5 stars stating "More than politics, the emotional sequences work out well for all".

=== Box office ===
Yatra collected ₹5 crore in the first five days. The film, which grossed a total of ₹ 28.5 crore worldwide against a budget of ₹12 crore, performed decently at the box office. Its worldwide distributor's share was ₹ 15.8 crore. Yatra Managed to collect ₹ 1.20 crore at the USA Box Office.

== Sequel ==
The second part titled Yatra 2 was released on 8 February 2024.
