= Bhavan's Vivekananda College =

College in Telangana, India

- Type: Private institution
- Established: 1993
- Affiliations: Osmania University, AICTE, Autonomous college UGC
- Location: Neredmet, Sainikpuri Post, Secunderabad, Telangana, India; 17.4895183°N 78.5346509°E
- Campus: Urban, 50 acres (0.20 km^{2})
- Website: www.bhavansvc.org
- Location within Telangana Location within India

Bhavan's Vivekananda College popularly Bhavan's Sainikpuri, is a graduate and postgraduate college in Sainikpuri Post, Neredmet, Secunderabad, India. The institute was established by the Bharatiya Vidya Bhavan trust in 1993. It offers graduate and postgraduate courses in Science, Commerce and Humanities.

== Campus ==
The campus is spread over 50 acres (200,000 m^{2}), housing Bhavan's Sri RamaKrishna Vidyalaya and Aurobindo Junior College. The college has recreational and sports facilities including a cricket ground, football ground, basketball court and volleyball court.

=== Physical sciences departments ===
There are three departments in the physical sciences:

- The Department of Mathematics started at the time of the inception of the college with one lecturer and two undergraduate courses (Maths-Physics-Electronics and Maths-Physics-Computer Science). Statistics was introduced in 1994 with one lecturer and one undergraduate course (Maths-Statistics-Computer Science). The department offers four undergraduate courses with the following combinations: Mathematics-Electronics-Computer Science (M.E.CS), Mathematics-Statistics-Computer Science (M.S.CS), Mathematics-Physics-Computer Science (M.P.CS), and Mathematics-Physics-Chemistry (M.P.C).
- The Department of Physics and Electronics was established at the inception of the college with three undergraduate courses (M.P.C., M.P.E., and M.P.Cs.) with an intake of 65 students and three faculty members. The department has a strength of about 350 students and six faculty members.
- The Computer Science Department started with one undergraduate course: B.Sc (Computers). Today the college offers B.Sc, BCA, B.Com (Computers), and M.Sc (CS). The department staff has grown from two members to 20, catering to more than 2,100 students from 30 students in B.Sc (Computers) in 1993.

=== Commerce Block ===
The Department of Commerce started in 1993 with two faculty members and one section of B.Com (regular) course with 43 students.

=== Life Sciences Department ===
The Life Sciences block consists of four departments.

==== Botany, Genetics and Biotechnology ====
The Botany department was started in 1993 by K. Vijayalakshmi Rao, with the introduction of the course Microbiology-Botany-Chemistry, followed by the Department of Genetics, with the introduction of the course Botany-Genetics-Chemistry. Further, growth to the department came in 1995, with the introduction of the course Microbiology-Genetics-Chemistry. In 1998, the Botany-Genetics-Chemistry course was discontinued.

The department grew in 2002–03, with the integration of the Department of Biotechnology with the introduction of a new course: Biotechnology-Biochemistry-Chemistry. 2007 saw the emergence of Biotechnology-Genetics and Chemistry.

The department consists of four laboratories, for practicals in Botany, Genetics and Biotechnology. It has a separate Plant Tissue Culture laboratory.

==== Biochemistry ====
The Department of Biochemistry was started in 1999 with one undergraduate course and an intake of nine students. The Post-graduate department was started in 2001 with an intake of 22 students. The department runs B.Sc and M.Sc Biochemistry courses. The department encourages students to enter PG courses and to join research institutes. It also initiates research activities for students and staff to get funding from other organizations.

==== Microbiology ====
The Microbiology department was established in 1993 and blossomed into a full-fledged department with a Masters program, M.Sc MicroBiology in 2000.

At the undergraduate level the department offers three courses with the combinations: Microbiology-Botany-Chemistry (M.B.C.), Microbiology-Genetics-chemistry (M.G.C.), and Microbiology-Biochemistry-Chemistry (M.B.C.).

==== Chemistry ====
The Chemistry Department started in 1993 with present vice principal Dr. P. Uma as the only faculty member and two courses — Mathematics-Physics-Chemistry, and Microbiology-Botany-Chemistry. By 2002, there were seven faculty members and five courses. The number of students enrolled has grown from around 30 in the 1993 to above 400 in 2006.

=== Management Studies Department ===
The department of Management Studies was established during 2002 with an intake of 60 students. Now, the intake is 120. The department offers a two-year master's degree in Business Administration, affiliated to Osmania University and approved by AICTE. The MBA programme is divided into four semesters offering specializations in Marketing, Finance, Human Resources and Systems.

Instruction is through classroom teaching, seminars, group discussions, role plays, case studies, and management games, with the help of overhead and LCD projectors. Students visit local industries and go for week-long industrial tours. Corporate experts are invited to the department. It organizes orientation programmes, workshops, symposia and management meets.

The department has institutional membership with professional bodies: All India Management Association (AIMA), Hyderabad Management Association (HMA). Faculty members attend the seminars and conferences organized by these bodies.

=== Department Of Mass Communication and Journalism ===
The department was established during the 2011–12 academic year. For the first time, 36 students have been enrolled for this course, which has other elective subjects (compulsorily for BA course) Political Science and Communicative English. This coordinator is Ujwala Desai, head of the Department for Languages.

== Notable alumni ==
- Gagan Narang, Indian shooter.
- Ambati Rayudu, Indian cricket team player.
- Aadi Saikumar, Indian Actor.

== See also ==
- Education in India
- Literacy in India
- List of institutions of higher education in Telangana
