= Muran (film) =

- Theatrical release poster
- Directed by: Rajan Madhav
- Written by: Rajan Madhav
- Produced by: Cheran; Ronnie Screwvala
- Starring: Cheran; Prasanna; Haripriya; Nikita Thukral; Suma Bhattacharya
- Cinematography: Padmesh
- Edited by: Arun Durairaj
- Music by: Sajan Madhav
- Production companies: Dream Theatres; UTV Motion Pictures
- Distributed by: UTV Motion Pictures
- Release date: 30 September 2011
- Running time: 134 minutes
- Country: India
- Language: Tamil

Muran (transl. At Variance) is a 2011 Indian Tamil-language action thriller film written and directed by debutant Rajan Madhav. It stars Cheran alongside Prasanna, with Haripriya, Nikita Thukral and Jayaprakash in pivotal roles. The story revolves around two contrasting characters and depicts the incidents that occur when they meet each other. The film is highly inspired by Alfred Hitchcock's psychological thriller Strangers on a Train (1951). Co-produced and distributed by UTV Motion Pictures, Muran was released on 30 September 2011.

== Plot ==
In a hotel in Bangalore, Nanda (Cheran) is playing a song on his guitar for producers who are helping him get an opportunity as a musician in Tamil cinema. At this instant, Arjun (Prasanna), heavily drunk, makes a scene, stating that he will fall from there (the top floor of the hotel) to the swimming pool on the ground, and he does.

While returning to Chennai, Nanda's car engine gets seized due to the sudden brake applied to avoid collision with another car driven by arrogant drunken youngsters. Arjun, who drove alone to Chennai, gives Nanda a lift in his car. They are both introduced and find that they have many differences in opinion. They both share the tragic stories of their lives while travelling. Nanda tells him about his unloving wife Indhu (Nikita Thukral), and his postmarital love Lavanya (Haripriya). He states he lives in a situation where he is uncomfortably adjusting to life with his wife.

Then, Arjun tells Nanda about his materialistic father, Devarajan (Jayaprakash), a famous industrialist and business magnate, who asks him to continue Devarajan's business and follow his ideas even though Arjun does not like it. Moreover, tragedy occurs when Devarajan rapes Arjun's lady love Linda (Suma Bhattacharya), who worked in Devarajan's office. Linda commits suicide as her "future" father-in-law destroyed her chastity. Arjun lives his life in the shadow of his father to keep the promise to his love that he made before she died.

After some time travelling, both of them meet the youngsters responsible for seizing Nanda's car in a motel. Arjun initiates a fight with them, and Nanda joins to help him. Finally, while escaping in their car, both of them chase and make the same thing happen to Nanda's car. Afterwards, while approaching the destination of their journey, Arjun explains to Nanda his idea of solving both their problems in a criss-cross manner. The plan calls for Arjun to kill Indhu and for Nanda to kill Devarajan. Arjun explains that no one can solve the murder, as Arjun and Nanda are strangers and the police and outsiders cannot determine any motive. Arjun explains that, as both of them are strangers, if he kills Nanda's wife in a situation that appears to be an accident while Nanda is officially engaged in another place, nothing can be traced. Nanda immediately turns down the deal and leaves.

In a week's daily routine, Nanda increasingly identifies with Arjun's idea that the only problem in his life is his wife. After a week, his wife is involved in an accident on the highway and dies on the spot. The next day, Arjun comes to Nanda's home and describes how he caused the accident and how he found out Indhu had been unfaithful to Nanda by having an affair with her colleague Gowtham. Arjun asks Nanda to complete his part of the plan by murdering his father and explains he had another plan for him. Both of them meet frequently at locations where no one can see them together, and both of them are officially unconnected strangers to the world. Nanda explains he cannot murder anyone. Arjun forces him to go through with it by saying that his dad was an evil human and the only way for him to have a happy life is for his father to die.

Meanwhile, a policeman and a relative of Indhu suspects that Nanda arranged Indhu's accident by hiring a hitman, as Nanda started living happily with his love. The policeman's suspicions make him Arjun's next target. Arjun kills him, and the news reports that the policeman was killed due to an electrical leak in his home.

Nanda understands that Arjun is already highly engaged in the deal and will not stop until he accepts it. So he agrees to murder Devarajan while convincing himself that he is doing it for the greater good. Arjun provides the plan to Nanda and leaves the city to establish an alibi while the murder occurs. Nanda follows Devarajan to execute the plan but finds out that Devarajan is a good and kind human, and so he withdraws his murder plan. The following day, Arjun calls him to ask why he failed and asks to meet with him. In the shopping mall where he had planned to meet with Arjun, Nanda runs into his lover's friend. She casually explains Arjun's evil nature when she sees Arjun. She explains how Arjun caused Linda's suicide by breaking up with her. Nanda understood Arjun had painted a self-heroic story and betrayed him. Nanda tells Arjun that he will not do anything for him, as he knows the truth, and asks him to leave him forever. Arjun seems to finally accept Nanda's refusal but warns him that accidents can happen at any time.

Over the next few days, Nanda becomes increasingly alarmed by accidents threatening Lavanya's safety, realizing that Arjun is behind them all. Lavanya is confused about what is happening to Nanda and believes he is going mad. Arjun hears Lavanya telling her friend about Nanda and informs Nanda that he is still active and can kill Lavanya. Nanda finally makes a decision and tells Arjun he is ready to murder Devarajan. Arjun lays his plan and goes to Bangalore.

Meanwhile, Nanda breaks into the hotel in Bangalore where Arjun is staying and tells him that he is going to kill him instead of Devarajan. Arjun fights back and falls from the roof near the swimming pool, into which he dives at the start of the film. Hotel authorities report the case as a drunken jump from a roof. Arjun dies instantly, and Nanda is satisfied that he did not have to pull the trigger to kill Arjun as he had initially planned.

== Cast ==
- Cheran as Nanda
- Prasanna as Arjun
- Haripriya as Lavanya
- Nikita as Indhu
- Suma Bhattacharya as Linda
- Jagan as Rajesh
- Jayaprakash as Devarajan
- Radha Ravi as Rathnaswamy
- Neelima Rani as Jayanthi
- Ramanathan as Indhu's father
- Remo Ram as Sub-inspector Ram
- Sri Priya as Sudha, Arjun's coworker
- Ganja Karuppu as Sivabalan
- Scissor Manohar as a fraud
- Ramakrishnan as himself
- Prathap Pothan (cameo appearance in the song "Ithu Varai")
- Mukti Mohan as an item number in "Andhi Mantharai" (uncredited)

== Production ==
Prasanna lost 10 kilograms (22 lb) of weight for his role. Filming began in September 2010. By early April, filming was 70% complete. In the same month, UTV Motion Pictures had acquired all the rights to the film from Dream Theatres and would complete the film. The film was prominently shot on the Bangalore-Chennai highway.

== Soundtrack ==
Music was composed by Sajan Madhav.

No.	Title	Singer(s)	Length
1.	"Muran Muran"	Naveen Madhav, Rahul Nambiar, Cristiano Ronaldo dos Santos Aveiro
2.	"Anal Veyil"	Naveen Madhav
3.	"Andhi Mantharai"	Rita Thyagarajan, Daya, Naveen Madhav
4.	"Ithu Varai"	Naresh Iyer, Saindhavi
5.	"Naan Kanden"	Ranjith, Lionel Messigitrachan Mahadevan, Astana Divya Vijay Shankar

== Release ==
Muran was initially scheduled to release on 16 September 2011, but was pushed to 23 September, and finally released on 30 September.

== Critical reception ==
Sify enthusiastically rated it 'Very good' and called it an "engaging thriller." On the contrary, Pavithra Srinivasan of Rediff.com rated it 2.5/5 complaining that it was heavily inspired
