= Chithiram Pesuthadi 2 =

2019 film by Rajan Madhav

Chithiram Pesudhadi 2
- Theatrical release poster
- Directed by: Rajan Madhav
- Written by: Rajan Madhav
- Produced by: L. V. Srikanth; SN Ezilan; Yugesram
- Starring: Vidharth; Ajmal Ameer; Ashok Kumar; Radhika Apte; Nivedhitha; Gayathrie; Nivas Adithan; Nandan Loganathan; Priya Banerjee
- Cinematography: Padmesh
- Edited by: K Venkatramanan
- Music by: Sajan Madhav
- Production company: Dream Bridge Productions
- Release date: 15 February 2019
- Running time: 130 minutes
- Country: India
- Language: Tamil

Chithiram Pesuthadi 2 (transl. The Picture Speaks 2) is a 2019 Indian Tamil-language hyperlink crime thriller film written and directed by Rajan Madhav. It features an ensemble cast including Vidharth, Ajmal Ameer, Ashok Kumar, Radhika Apte, Nivedhitha, Gayathrie, Nivas Adithan, and newcomers Nandan Loganathan and Priya Banerjee. The film has music composed by Sajan Madhav, cinematography by Padmesh and editing by K. Venkatramanan. It is a hyperlink film of four different stories that happen in 48 hours.

The film which began production in 2013 under the title Ula was shot in and around Chennai, and the film was released on 15 February 2019. Although the title may suggest it as a sequel to the 2006 blockbuster Chithiram Pesuthadi, the storyline is entirely different, hence proving no apparent relationship between the two films, even though both films were produced by the same producer.

== Plot ==
Thiru (Vidharth) is a hired killer who attacks a dreaded gangster (Shammi Thilakan) with a sickle but has to escape as he is witnessed by Kathir (Nandan) and is forced to go underground with Salim (Ashok Kumar). Kathir admits the gangster in a hospital and also informs the police but fails to keep an appointment with his girlfriend Priya (Gayathrie), who has come out of her house to elope with him. Salim is ordered by his boss (Subbu Panchu) to finish off the gangster, who is now hospitalized, and also kill Thiru after that. Meanwhile, the gangster's wife Durga (Radhika Apte) rushes to the hospital but seems to be intent on seeing her husband die rather than saving him. The fourth plot involves Vicky (Ajmal Ameer), who is in the danger of losing his property and turns to blackmail to get the three crores to save it. There is yet another story of two thieves, Mani (Nivas Adithan) and Senthil Palani (Blade Shankar), who rob Priya's bag, which contains her family jewel with the former in love with a call girl named Dhanalakshmi (Nivedhitha), who in turn is in love with Thiru. There is also a policeman (Aadukalam Naren) and industrialist, another cop who is badly in need of money and hatches a plan to rob a businessman.

== Cast ==
- Vidharth as Thiru
- Ajmal Ameer as Vicky
- Ashok Kumar as Salim
- Radhika Apte as Durga
- Nivedhitha as Dhanalakshmi
- Gayathrie as Priya
- Nivas Adithan as Mani
- Nandan Loganathan as Kathir
- Priya Banerjee as Nanditha
- Shammi Thilakan as Gangster
- Blade Shankar as Senthil Palani
- Subbu Panchu as Salim's boss
- Aadukalam Naren as Police Inspector
- Azhagam Perumal
- Ganeshkar
- Vatsan Chakravarthy
- Dwayne Bravo Guest appearance in the song "yenda"

== Production ==
In July 2012, actor Prasanna revealed that Rajan Madhav had finished his next script and that he would be a part of the cast. The film was titled as Ula in August 2012 and was said to be a multi-starrer.

Filming began in March 2013. Along with Prasanna, Narain was supposed to play the lead roles, but the pair were subsequently replaced with Ajmal and Ashok Kumar, while Gayathrie was selected to play the female lead. Ajmal stated that he played a rock star in the film and that he was paired with Mumbai-based Priya Banerjee. Vidharth said that he played the role of a rowdy gang leader. Gayathrie in October 2013 stated that every character in the film comes in shades of grey and that seventy per cent of the film had been completed. West Indies cricketer Dwayne Bravo agreed to dance for a song in the film, which was shot in October 2013.

In October 2018, after five years of delay, the film's title was changed from Ula to Chithiram Pesuthadi 2.

== Soundtrack ==
- Dal Meni Dal Meni – Gaana Bala, Naveen Madhav, Dwayne Bravo

== Reception ==
Srivatsan S of The Hindu derided the film for being outdated. Ashameera Aiyappan of Cinema Express too gave similar comments.
