= Rough (film) =

- Directed by: C. H. Subba Reddy
- Written by: Marudhuri Raja
- Produced by: M. Abhilash
- Starring: Aadi; Rakul Preet Singh; Srihari
- Cinematography: K. K. Senthil Kumar; S. Arun Kumar
- Edited by: Marthand K. Venkatesh
- Music by: Mani Sharma
- Production company: Sridevi Entertainments
- Release date: 28 November 2014
- Running time: 152 mins
- Country: India
- Language: Telugu
- Budget: ₹8 crore (US$830,000)
- Box office: ₹15 crore (US$1.6 million)

Rough is a 2014 Telugu romantic action comedy film directed by C. H. Subba Reddy. The movie is produced by M. Abilash on Sridevi Entertainments Banner while Aadi, Rakul Preet Singh and Srihari play pivotal roles. Mani Sharma composed the Music. Actor Srihari died before the film was released. The film received mixed reviews from critics and was an average hit at the box office.

It was dubbed into Hindi under the same title.

== Plot ==
Chandhu is an orphan who falls for Nandhu, a college student and decides to marry her. Later on, he learns that Nandhu is the only sister of a rich businessman, Siddharth. One day, Chandhu meets Siddharth and reveals his desire to marry his sister. A shocked and upset Siddharth challenges Chandhu to make his sister fall in love with him.

== Cast ==
- Aadi as Chandu
- Rakul Preet Singh as Nandini "Nandu"
- Srihari as Siddharth
- M. S. Narayana
- Raghu Babu
- Y. Kasi Viswanath as Chandu's father
- Jaya Prakash Reddy
- Ravi Prakash as Chandu's brother-in-law
- Raja Ravindra as Police
- Suhasini as Chandu's sister
- Pavithra Lokesh as Chandu's mother
- Tanikella Bharani as Sooraj's father
- Ajay as Sooraj
- Supreet as Sooraj's brother
- Krishna Bhagawan as Dharmaraju

== Music ==
Rough

Soundtrack album by Mani Sharma
- Released: 3 November 2014
- Recorded: 2013–2014
- Genre: Feature film soundtrack
- Length: 27:18
- Language: Telugu
- Label: Junglee Music
- Producer: Mani Sharma

Mani Sharma chronology
Basanthi (2014)	Rough (2014)	Lion (2015)

The film soundtrack and background music were composed by Mani Sharma. The soundtrack was marketed by Junglee Music. The soundtrack was unveiled on 3 November 2014 at JRC Function Hall in Hyderabad. Suriya attended the event as the chief guest while Rana Daggubati, Nithiin and Allari Naresh in attendance along with the film's principal cast & crew.

Reviewing the soundtrack, IndiaGlitz wrote "Mani Sharma's albums have always raised expectations. This one is no exception. Helped by the experienced Bhaskarabhatla, he delivers an album that has the potential to entertain sections of mass and class audiences. The choice of singers is the saving grace. He may not be back in full form but he proves that he is a thoroughgoing entertainer even in 2014."

All tracks are written by Bhaskarabhatla Ravi Kumar.

Track-List
No.	Title	Artist(s)	Length
1.	"Rabbaru Banthi"	Narendra, Sudhamayi	04:19
2.	"Oye Oye Meettapillaku"	Karunya	04:28
3.	"Edukondala Venkata"	Narendra, Sravana Bhargavi	04:11
4.	"Abbobbo Veedu"	Pavan Charan	02:13
5.	"Ee Vennela Bommani"	Pavan Charan	03:58
6.	"Nandu I Love You"	Hemachandra	03:58
7.	"Edukondala Venkata Simha"	Simha, Sravana Bhargavi	04:11
Total length:			27:18
