= Anando Brahma =

2017 film

- Theatrical release poster
- Directed by: Mahi V. Raghav
- Written by: Mahi V. Raghav
- Produced by: Vijay Chilla; Shashi Devireddy
- Starring: Taapsee Pannu; Srinivasa Reddy; Vennela Kishore; Shakalaka Shankar; Rajiv Kanakala
- Cinematography: Anish Tharun Kumar
- Edited by: Shravan Katikaneni
- Music by: K
- Production company: 70mm Entertainments
- Release date: 18 August 2017
- Running time: 123 minutes
- Country: India
- Language: Telugu
- Budget: ₹3 crore
- Box office: est. ₹15 crore or ₹6 crore (distributor share)

Anando Brahma is a 2017 Indian Telugu-language comedy horror film written and directed by Mahi V. Raghav, starring Tapasee Pannu, Srinivasa Reddy, Shakalaka Shankar, and Vennela Kishore. Produced by Vijay Chilla and Shashi Devireddy, the film has music composed by K.

The film released on August 18, 2017, to positive reviews. The film was remade in Tamil as Petromax (2019), Bengali as Bhootchakra Pvt. Ltd. (2019) and Kannada as Mane Maratakkide (2019). It went on to be an inspiration for another Kannada film Damayanthi (2019) and also for the Pakistani film Lafangey (2022).

== Plot ==
Ramu, an NRI living in Malaysia, arrives in India after hearing the news of the Uttarakhand floods. He discovers his parents in the hospital mortuary and becomes sad. Deepa, Taapsee, Vijayachander, and Raghu are ghosts staying in their ancestral house. They are waiting eagerly for Vijayachander's wife to come home. They don't know how or when they died. A family visits their house for tenancy, but they scare the family away. The broker, who deals with the house, is also scared as he spots Taapsee's ghost and informs the house owner, Ramu, and his cop friend, Vamshi, of their presence. Vamshi is apprehensive, while Ramu dismisses it as a concoction. Vamshi conspires with Yadagiri to force Ramu to sell his house cheaply by fabricating and peddling the ghost story. They plan to demolish the house and build a hotel for high profits.

Sidhu overhears their conversation and makes a deal with Ramu that he will send his three friends to stay one night at the house, and if they survive, Ramu will pay 20% of the sale price to Sidhu as a commission. But his three friends encounter the ghosts that night. One is locked in the bathroom, his friend (Jeeva) is knocked unconscious, and another is scared away. Ramu believes ghosts exist in the house and is about to sell it at Yadagiri's demanded price. But Ramu, after Sidhu urges him, gives him one last chance to prove it's not haunted. Sidhu and his friend Tulasi meet Babu and Raju coincidentally at the hospital, and they all desperately need money. Sidhu has to care for his amnesiac mother and needs 25 lakhs for cardiac surgery to treat the hole in his heart. Babu, who is so infatuated with movies that he starts enacting the roles he watches, is duped by Bharani, who poses himself as an agent of famous cinema producers in Tollywood. Tulasi, a drunkard who drinks after the clock ticks nine at night, bets on a cricket match in an inebriated state and loses the money he saved for his son's surgery. Raju is deaf and night-blind and often uses his flute when frightened. He is embroiled in a robbery case after robbers looted the ATM he was guarding, and a CCTV camera caught him napping. The security agency that hired him tells him to repay the money lost to prevent getting banned from the agency.

As they start staying in the house, all the ghosts decide to scare them away. However, all four friends remain calm due to their peculiar habits, like Babu, who starts acting out scenes like Vikram from Anniyan. Instead, they begin intimidating the spirits. After the first day, Ramu inquires Sidhu about the presence of ghosts and decides to give him two more days to sell the house. Vamshi does not like Sidhu and his group staying inside the house and sends fake ghosts to scare them away. However, the real ghosts frighten the counterfeit ghosts. On the second night, Sidhu and his group remain calm and scare the ghosts. However, on the third night, the ghosts frighten the group and are about to kill them when Sidhu's mother comes to the house looking for him. She is none other than Vijayachander's wife.

Past: A flashback reveals that Ramu is their son. Ramu gets an offer for a job in Malaysia and leaves. The couple adopted Taapsee and Deepa. Ramu returns to India and incurs a loss. So Ramu wishes to sell the house to compensate for his business debts. Vijayachander refuses to sell the house after he insults Taapsee and Deepa, calling them orphans. Ramu gets infuriated and kills the entire family by hitting and burning them, excluding his mother. She witnessed Ramu murdering them.

Present: Vamshi discovers that Ramu killed his family, but Yadagiri kills him. The ghosts realise the reasons for their deaths and enact their revenge by killing Ramu, Yadagiri and Yadagiri's goons. When Sidhu and his friends leave the house, they find a bag filled with cash in Ramu's car. They converted the house into a retirement home. They live happily with Taapsee's mother, who recovered from amnesia, and other old pensioners, abandoned by their children.

== Cast ==
- Taapsee Pannu as Ghost
- Srinivasa Reddy as Sidhu
- Shakalaka Shankar as Babu
- Vennela Kishore as Raju
- Vidyullekha Raman as fake ghost
- Supreeth Reddy as Shankar
- Thagubothu Ramesh as Tulasi
- Rajiv Kanakala as Ramu
- Raja Ravindra as Inspector Vamshi
- Posani Krishna Murali as Inspector Krishna Manohar
- Vijayachander as Ramu's father
- Jeeva as Paidithalli, Sidhu's friend
- Shashank
- Raghu Karumanchi as Servant
- Sivannarayana Naripeddi as Doctor
- Tanikella Bharani as Manikyam
- Chatrapathi Sekhar as Priest
- Sudheer Babu as himself, cameo appearance
- Baby Dolly as Deepa
- Venu Yeldandi
- RJ Hemanth

== Soundtrack ==
Anando Brahma

Soundtrack album by K
- Released: 10 August 2017
- Recorded: 2017
- Genre: Soundtrack
- Length: 12:20
- Label: Saregama South
- Producer: K

K chronology
The Ghazi Attack (2017)	Anando Brahma (2017)	London Babulu (2017)
External audio
- Official Audio Jukebox on YouTube

Music is composed by K.

Track list
No.	Title	Lyrics	Singer(s)	Length
1.	"Merise"	Krishna Kanth	S.V. Jananie	3:20
2.	"Aham Brahmasmi (Naa Madhi Ninnu)" (Original Lyricist : C. Narayana Reddy)	Mahi V. Raghav	Malgudi Subha	2:19
3.	"The Family - Theme Music" (Instrumental)			1:49
4.	"Ramu, The Son - Theme Music" (Instrumental)			1:39
5.	"Skeleton Guy and Ghost Girl - Theme Music" (Instrumental)			1:01
6.	"The Mission - Theme Music" (Instrumental)			1:52
Total length:				12:20

== Release ==
Anando Brahma released on 18 August 2017.

== Reception ==
=== Box office ===
Anando Brahma collected ₹15 crore (US$1.6 million) worldwide gross.

=== Critical reception ===
Sangeetha Devi Dundoo of The Hindu wrote "Laugh-aloud moments apart, Anando Brahma is a simple story of a family and crime. Taapsee is a significant player in the drama and does her part effectively, but she’s not a show stealer. And that’s a good thing. A film needn’t always ride on star value". The Times of India gave 3 out of 5 stars stating "Four men find themselves in a house believed to be haunted and it's a delightful riot of comedy juxtaposed with horror". Firstpost gave 3.25 out of 5 stars stating "Anando Brahma has no frills attached to it and it’s pretty clear about what it wants to say, while avoiding several cliches associated with the genre. It reminded me of all those simple bed-time stories which we once heard from our grandparents, and Mahi V Raghav has brought that essence into the story-telling. It’s a simple film with a good dose of humour. Maybe the next time I go watch a horror film, I’ll end up smiling throughout its runtime or carry a flute along with me. Thank God, at least now, there’s one film which doesn’t suffer from horror-comedy fatigue".

Business Standard gave 3.5 out of 5 stars stating "Anando Brahma has its flaws, especially when we are not explained some actions of Rajeev Kanakala, but you can easily oversee it, thanks to the rib-tickling fun second half". The Indian Express gave 2 out of 5 stars stating "We have seen most of the paranormal activities of Anando Brahma in many other films in the past. The horror scenes hardly catch us by surprise, while comedy comes as a saving grace". Idlebrain.com gave 3 out of 5 stars stating "Anando Brahma partly works due to a few comedy episodes, but on other aspects it leaves a lot to be desired".

Sify gave 3.5 out of 5 stars stating "Anando Brahma largely works due to its hilarious moments in the second half. First half is regular stuff but it ends up as decent horror comedy as four comedians show their best in a 30 minutes episode in the post-interval sequences". IndiaGlitz gave 2.75 out of 5 stars stating "Anando Brahma comes into its own in the portions where the counter-intuitive element of humans scaring away ghosts comes to the fore. Good performances, too, make it a decent entertainer. The first half could have been much better on the comedy front". Great Andhra gave 3 out of 5 stars stating "One can watch it for its comedy and second half. Among the recent horror comedies, this one is a bit different and has more laugh-out loud moments. It will appeal to audiences who are seeking some decent comedy".

== Accolades ==
South Indian International Movie Awards

- Nominated - Best Debutant Director - Mahi V Raghav
- Nominated - Best Comedian - Srinivas Reddy
- Nominated - Best Comedian - Shakalaka Shankar
