= Save the Tigers =

Indian comedy drama series

- Promotional poster
- Genre: Comedy drama
- Created by: Mahi V Raghav; Pradeep Advaitham
- Written by: Pradeep Advaitham; Vijay Namoju; Anand Karthik
- Directed by: Teja Kakumanu, Arun Kothaplly
- Starring: Priyadarshi Pulikonda; Abhinav Gomatam; Krishna Chaitanya; Deviyani Sharma; Pavani Gangireddy; Jordar Sujatha
- Music by: Ajay Arasada
- Country of origin: India
- Original language: Telugu
- No. of seasons: 2
- No. of episodes: 13

Production
- Executive producer: Rohith Pisapati
- Producers: Mahi V Raghav; Chinna Vasudeva Reddy
- Cinematography: S. V. Vishweshwar
- Editor: Shravan Katikaneni
- Camera setup: Multi-camera
- Production company: Three Autumn Leaves

Original release
- Network: Disney+ Hotstar
- Release: 27 April 2023

Save the Tigers is an Indian Telugu-language comedy drama thriller television series created by Pradeep Advaitham and Mahi V Raghav and directed by Teja Kakumanu and Arun Kothapally. The series produced by Mahi V Raghav and Chinna Vasudeva Reddy under Three Autumn Leaves. It stars Priyadarshi Pulikonda, Abhinav Gomatam, Krishna Chaitanya, Deviyani Sharma, Pavani Gangireddy and Jordar Sujatha in the lead roles. It premiered on Disney+ Hotstar on 27 April 2023.

== Plot ==
Ghanta Ravi (Priyadarshi Pulikonda) is a dairy farm proprietor, Vikram (Krishna Chaitanya) is a creative ad writer, while Rahul (Abhinav Gomatam) nurtures aspirations of becoming a writer. Through a series of serendipitous encounters, these individuals forge a bond, giving rise to an unforeseen and unique friendship. They share a common frustration with their wives' behaviors. The trio faces legal trouble when caught in a drunk driving case. Simultaneously, the police discover a prominent actress has been kidnapped. The series explores whether the trio has any connection to her disappearance. The reasons behind their alcohol consumption are revealed, examining if it is linked to their marital issues. The trio refers to themselves as "Tigers", and the series explores the significance of this choice in the larger narrative.

== Cast ==
=== Overview ===
Character	Portrayed by		
Character	Portrayed by	Season 1 (2023)	Season 2 (2024)
Vikram	Krishna Chaitanya	Main	Main
Ghanta Ravi	Priyadarshi Pulikonda	Main	Main
Rahul	Abhinav Gomatam	Main	Main
Adv. Rekha	Deviyani Sharma	Main	Main
Hymavathi	Jordar Sujatha	Main	Main
Dr. Madhuri	Pavani Gangireddy	Main	Main

=== Main ===
- Krishna Chaitanya as Vikram: A corporate guy who faces constant heat from his boss in the first season
- Priyadarshi Pulikonda as Ghanta Ravi: He runs a dairy business. He is proud of his line of work even though his immediate family including his wife and elder daughter isn't
- Abhinav Gomatam as Rahul: He quit his job to become a freelance writer. He is shown to be always struggling to find work.
- Deviyani Sharma as Adv. Rekha: She is Vikram wife and a lawyer by profession
- Jordar Sujatha as Hymavathi: She is Ghanta Ravi's wife and a beautician by profession
- Pavani Gangireddy as Dr. Madhuri: She Rahul's wife and a doctor by profession

=== Recurring ===
- Gangavva as Poshavva, Ghanta Ravi's mother. She lives with her family, consisting of her son, daughter-in-law and two grandchildren, in their family buffalo pen (Season 1-)
- Jabardasth Rohini as Lakshmi: She is the house help of Rahul and Madhuri. She has a witty sense of humour and often looks down on her boss, Rahul for not having a full-time job (Season 1-)
- Harsha Vardhan as Ram Mohan: Vikram's boss (Season 1)
- Sunaina Badam as Rajini Devi, Vikram's co-worker. Like Vikram, she too is put through a great deal of stress by Ram Mohan who makes her do his son's homework (Season 1)
- Srikanth Iyengar as Inspector Jagan (Season 1-)
- Satya Krishnan as Spandana a psychiatrist and a pseudo feminist. She misleads the pairs in the counselling and she eventually becomes close with Hymavathi, Madhuri and Rekha (Season 1-)
- Venu Yeldandi as Raghava, a news anchor. He harbours a minor vendetta against Rahul and thereby on all the three tigers because Rahul prank called him in the first season. It is revealed in the second season that he is the husband of Spandana and a wife's victim. (Season 1-)
- Jayasri Rachakonda as Arundhati, Vikram's mother-in-law (Season 1-)
- Ananth Babu as Kumar, the president of the gated community in which Rahul and Madhuri live. He also doesn't have a high opinion of Rahul (Season 1-)
- Seerat Kapoor as actresses Hamsalekha (Season 2) (Extended Cameo Appearance)
- Darshana Banik as Harika. She has an unrequited crush on Vikram (Season 2)
- Kireeti Damaraju as actor Vrushan Babu. He is Hamsalekha's fiance at the beginning of the second season, later Hamsalekha Breaks up with him. In the third season in the parallel universe he appears as a hero's side kick in the film industry Rahul of that universe names his screen name as "Vrushan Babu".
- RK Mama as Pittala Srisailam, the MLA of Jubilee Hills (Season 2)
- Aarthi Ganeshkar as Laboni, Rahul's neighbour. She has frequent brushes with Rahul because of the latter's protest to her puppy soiling the lobby and barking frequently (Season 2)
- Sivannarayana Naripeddi as Rahul's father-in-law (Season 2)
- Muralidhar Goud as Ghanta Ravi's father-in-law. Also, Poshavva's younger sibling (Season 2)
- Ambati Srinivas as real estate salesperson 1 (Season 2)
- Mukku Avinash as real estate salesperson 2 (Season 2)

== Episodes ==
=== Series overview ===
Series	Episodes	Originally released
1	6	27 April 2023
2	7	15 March 2024

=== Season 1 (2023) ===
No. overall	No. in season	Title	Directed by	Written by	Original release date
1	1	"Mother's day"	Teja Kakumanu	Pradeep Advaitham; Vijay Namoju; Karthik Anand	27 April 2023
Three frustrated husbands are in the police station for a drunk-and-drive case and start telling their life stories to the CI. They tell him how they met at a school day event for their kids and became friends.
2	2	"Tiger Meet"	Teja Kakumanu	Pradeep Advaitham; Vijay Namoju; Karthik Anand	27 April 2023
The ACP informs the CI that the famous actress Hamsalekha is missing. The frustrated husbands continue to share their woes with the CI, about their life and marital problems that led them to meet at a bar for drinks.
3	3	"Tigers on TV"	Teja Kakumanu	Pradeep Advaitham; Vijay Namoju; Karthik Anand	27 April 2023
Rahul is jealous of his wife's relationship with her colleague. The wives of the three frustrated husbands meet at a beauty salon by coincidence and they see a video of their husbands creating a ruckus in a bar on TV.
4	4	"Dikky Dikky"	Teja Kakumanu	Pradeep Advaitham; Vijay Namoju; Karthik Anand	27 April 2023
5	5	"No Pain No Gain"	Teja Kakumanu	Pradeep Advaitham; Vijay Namoju; Karthik Anand	27 April 2023
Ghanta Ravi sees a guy getting too close to his daughter and warns him. Rahul attempts to work out but ends up with an injury. At the Hospital, he finds out Madhuri's colleague who he hates is actually engaged and Rahul is relieved.
6	6	"Rise of the Tigers"	Teja Kakumanu	Pradeep Advaitham; Vijay Namoju; Karthik Anand	27 April 2023
The underwear AD made by Vikram becomes a controversy and he loses his job. Rekha files a case against the AD. The CI asks them to leave but then realizes they are connected to the missing actress and arrests them.

=== Season 2 (2024) ===
No. overall	No. in season	Title	Directed by	Written by	Original release date
7	1	"Where is Hamsalekha?"	Arun Kothapally	Pradeep Advaitham; Vijay Namoju; Karthik Anand	15 March 2024
CI Bhikshapathi interrogates the protagonists. Confessions follow, straining relationships. Madhuri seeks space from Rahul, and Vikram's job news triggers Rekha's exit. Hymavati persuades Ganta Ravi to a gated community reluctantly.
8	2	"7 Year Itch"	Arun Kothapally	Pradeep Advaitham; Vijay Namoju; Karthik Anand	15 March 2024
Rekha, Hymavati, and Madhuri consult Spandana on marriage woes. She warns of the "7 Years Itch." Vikram launches a startup, impressing Harika. Ganta Ravi introduces Rahul to Hamsalekha's script opportunity. Ravi gets a corporator ticket.
9	3	"Hail Women Power"	Arun Kothaplly	Pradeep Advaitham; Vijay Namoju; Karthik Anand	15 March 2024
Hamsalekha asks Ganta Ravi to find a scriptwriter. Rahul faces criticism for chasing a dog. Ganta Ravi explores a gated community. Dimple runs for school captain. Wives are shocked by Spandana's views and behaviour at her anniversary.
10	4	"10000 BC"	Arun Kothapally	Pradeep Advaitham; Vijay Namoju; Karthik Anand	15 March 2024
In the Stone Age, a comical exploration of evolving relationships. Rahul complains about Laboni at a community meeting. Ganta Ravi gives money to MLA PA. Vikram and Harika's ad pitch is rejected, but an impromptu idea gets approved.
11	5	"Pets and Owners"	Arun Kothaplly	Pradeep Advaitham; Vijay Namoju; Karthik Anand	15 March 2024
Rahul's calf stunt sparks uproar. Ganta Ravi uses Hymavati's money for gated community. Madhuri disheartened by Rahul's behavior. Dimple fights Sahasra. Vikram-Harika bond over struggles. Dimple's school call panics Ganta Ravi-Hymavathi
12	6	"Family Celebration"	Arun Kothapally	Pradeep Advaitham; Vijay Namoju; Karthik Anand	15 March 2024
Ganta Ravi hosts event celebrating Dimple. Hamsalekha bonds with his family. Spandana, Vijaykanth reconcile. MLA's remarks upset Hamsalekha. Rekha takes a break for Aditi. Ganta Ravi consoles Dimple, offering lifelong support.
13	7	"Fall of the Tigers"	Arun Kothapally	Pradeep Advaitham; Vijay Namoju; Karthik Anand	15 March 2024
Vikram's party sparks Harika's emotions. Ganta Ravi-Hymavathi fights about money. Rahul rejects changes in the script. Vikram values Rekha. Misunderstanding ruins Vikram's marriage. Ganta Ravi was touched by Dimple. Rahul moves to Kolkata

== Reception ==
A critic from 123telugu gave the series 3.25/5 stars and stated "Save The Tigers is an uproarious series that guarantees laughter from start to finish. Priyadarshi, Abhinav Gomatam, and Krishna Chaitanya steal the show with their impeccable performances, infusing the series with an abundance of humor. While the storyline is uncomplicated and a few imperfections exist, the overall experience is perfect for a family weekend watch. Rest assured, this series offers a unique and entertaining experience without any compromise on originality."

Paul Nicodemus of The Times of India gave the series 3/5 stars and stated "In this Telugu comedy series, skillful direction by Teja Kakumanu and a well-cast ensemble bring to life the daily frustrations of three couples, providing a humorous commentary on modern life dynamics. Despite the entertaining and insightful content, the series concludes with a suspenseful 'to be continued' note in its final episode."

Avad Mohammad of OTTplay gave the series 3.5/5 stars and stated that "Save The Tigers is a riotous comedy caper that nails the sweet spot between humor and relatable scenarios. Clocking in at a concise half-hour per episode, it's the perfect dose of clean, family-friendly entertainment. Sure, there are a few moments that veer into the over-the-top territory, but that only adds to the charm. This series wraps up as a fantastic way to kick back and enjoy some quality time with your family. Trust me, it's worth a watch."

A critic from Eenadu stated that "Raghava and Pradeep bring lots of funny moments to the story of three couples dealing with issues like who's in charge and not trusting each other. Teja Kakumanu's funny acting adds to the fun, and the movie looks really good thanks to its great production."

Abhilasha Cherukuri of Cinema Express gave the series 3.5/5 stars and stated that "Save The Tigers initially hinted at a breezy and light-hearted experience, but it surprisingly leaves the audience with a sense of weariness and heaviness. There's a wishful longing for the writers to have delved more profoundly into the dependable premise and the fairly decent set of characters."

== See also ==
- List of Disney+ Hotstar original programming
