= Shaitan (TV series) =

- Genre: Crime; Thriller
- Written by: Mahi V Raghav; K. Ravi Kumar
- Directed by: Mahi V Raghav
- Starring: Rishi Lena Ravi Kale Shelly Kishore
- Music by: Sriram Maddury
- Country of origin: India
- Original language: Telugu
- No. of seasons: 1
- No. of episodes: 9

Production
- Producers: Mahi V. Raghav; Chinna Vasudeva Reddy
- Cinematography: N. Shanmuga Sundaram
- Editor: Shravan Katikaneni
- Running time: 21-29 minutes

Original release
- Network: Disney+ Hotstar
- Release: 15 June 2023

Shaitan is an Indian Telugu-language crime thriller television series written by K. Ravi Kumar, Mahi V Raghav and directed by Mahi V Raghav. It stars Rishi, Aneesha Dama, Deviyani Sharma, Jaffer Sadiq, Kamakshi Bhaskarla, Lena, Manikandan K., Nithin Prasanna, Ravi Kale, and Shelly Kishore in lead roles.

== Cast ==
- Rishi as Baali
- Shelly Kishore as Savitri, Baali and Gumthi's mother
- Jaffer Sadiq as Gumthi, Baali's brother
- Deviyani Sharma as Jayaprada, Baali's sister
  - Aneesha Dama as Young Jayaprada
- Lena as Mary Joseph IPS
- Kamakshi Bhaskarla as Kalavathi
- Manikandan R Achari as a Naxalite
- Nithin Prasanna as Vijay Kumar IPS
- Ravi Kale as Inspector Nagi Reddy

== Production ==
The filming of the series began in March 2022 and completed in October 2022.

=== Release ===
The series premiered on 15 June 2023 on Disney+ Hotstar.

== Reception ==
Sangeetha Devi Dundoo of The Hindu stated "Viewers are advised to watch it in isolation and use headphones, given the use of profane language, violence and sexual content. This one is not out to please family audiences and aims to be in the space of Hindi series such as Sacred Games, Paatal Lok and Mirzapur."

English Jagran also opined similar "If you love crime thrillers like 'Mirzapur' and 'Paatal Lok', then 'Shaitan' is for you."

Sakshi rated 2.5 stars out of 5 and opined "With an emotionally well-rounded story, the series would have been a winner."

A critic from Telangana Today wrote "There are many scenes in ‘Shaitan’ that make you cringe."

OTTPlay gave mix review "There was so much being said about this show by a section of the media stating that such violent shows and dark content should be censored before screening it for the audience."

123Telegu wrote "The realistic backdrop, the solid performances, and the last few episodes are its assets. But the show is highly predictable for the most part, and a few pivotal aspects lacked depth."

The series was also reviewed by Hindustan Times, Eenadu, Asianet News.
