= Rajan Madhav =

Indian film director

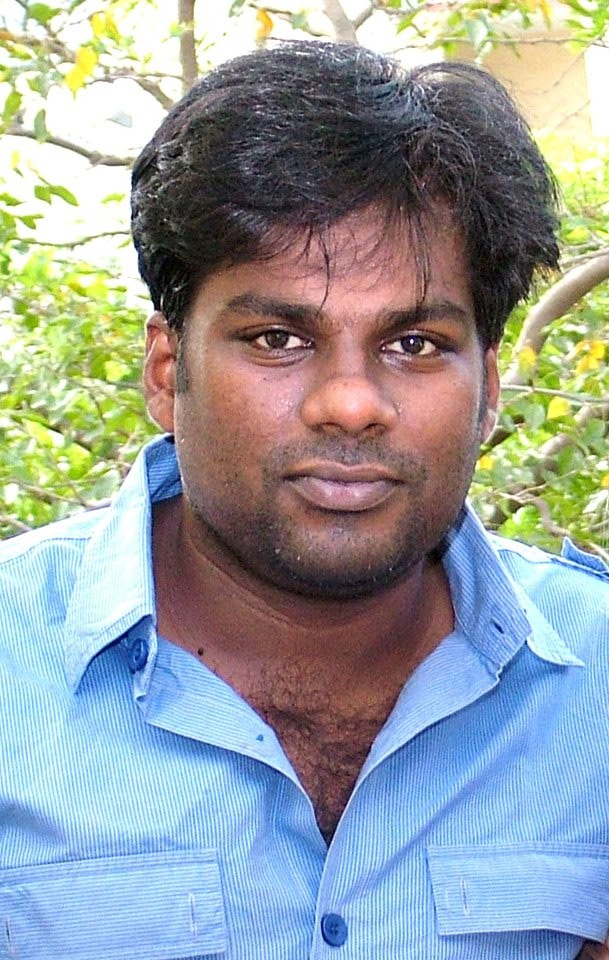
- Born: Rajan Babu Raveendran; 31 May 1975 (age 50); Chennai, India
- Occupations: Director, Screen writer
- Spouse: Sandhya

Rajan Babu (born Chennai, India, 31 May 1975) is an Indian film director, screenwriter, working predominantly in Tamil cinema based in Chennai. Having born into a family that appreciates all forms of cinema, he has imbibed the quality to breathe in the nuances of the cinema. This can be clearly seen in his debut film Muran. His dad Raveendran strongly inspired him to take up cinema as his career. While his brothers took it to music, Rajan Madhav made it to direction.

== Early life ==
He was born as one of the twin to music director Raveendran and Sobhana in Chennai. His brothers are Sajan Madhav and Naveen Madhav.

== Career ==
While his family was so much into music with Sajan Madhav being a music director and Naveen Madhav being a playback singer already, Rajan Madhav was a B.Com graduate and was looking forward to getting into direction. However, he was conscious enough not to use his dad's influence anywhere at work and so joined as an assistant director to Shaji Kailas. After working as an AD for about six films, he was all set to commit as a director himself which was when his dad Raveendran died. He then joined director Mysskin as Co-director in his movie Anjathey and then went on to become a director with his debut movie Muran. He then started filming his second film, titled as Ula. After four years of delay, in October 2018, the film's title was changed from Ula to Chithiram Pesuthadi 2. His third outing as director would be Kattam. Newcomer Nandhan and Sshivada are playing as lead pair in the movie.

== Personal life ==
After his first film, he fell in love with Sandhya who was working as an assistant director as well in Bollywood and married her on 23 May 2012 in Chennai.

== Filmography ==
| Year | Film | Credit | Notes |
|---|---|---|---|
| 2011 | Muran | Writer, director | Nominated Best Debut Director SIIMA awards, screened in CIFF |
| 2019 | Chithiram Pesuthadi 2 | Writer, director | |
| 2019 | Kattam | Writer, director | |
