= Mr. Pellikoduku =

Mr. Pelikoduku
- Directed by: Devi Prasad
- Written by: Himanshu Sharma
- Produced by: N. V. Prasad; Paras Jain
- Starring: Sunil; Isha Chawla; Vincent; Ravi Babu; Ali; Khaleel
- Cinematography: Sameer Reddy
- Edited by: Nandamuri Hari
- Music by: S. A. Rajkumar
- Distributed by: Megaa Super Good Films; BlueSky (overseas)
- Release date: 1 March 2013
- Running time: 138 minutes
- Country: India
- Language: Telugu

Mr. Pellikoduku (transl. Mr. Bride Groom) is a 2013 Indian Telugu-language film directed by Devi Prasad, starring Sunil and Isha Chawla. This movie was produced by N. V. Prasad and Paras Jain under the Megaa Super Good Films Banner, while S. A. Rajkumar scored the music. This film is an official remake of the 2011 Hindi film Tanu Weds Manu (directed by Anand L. Rai, with R. Madhavan and Kangana Ranaut in the lead roles). The film revolves around Buchi Babu, an NRI who returns to India after six years in order to find a bride among the ones in the list prepared by his parents, where he falls in love with Anjali. Mr. Pellikoduku released on 1 March 2013.

== Plot ==
The film begins with Buchi Babu (Sunil), a simple and well-settled NRI living in the United States. Pressured by his family to get married, he returns to India to find a bride. His family arranges a match for him with Anjali (Isha Chawla), a lively and free-spirited woman who loves to live life on her own terms. Buchi Babu visits Anjali's home with his family. He is instantly smitten by her beauty and charm. However, Anjali, uninterested in the traditional matchmaking process, pretends to be indifferent and even tries to scare him off by openly stating that she loves someone else. Despite her behavior, Buchi Babu finds himself genuinely attracted to Anjali and agrees to marry her. But during their next meeting, Anjali bluntly rejects him, stating that she has no interest in him and doesn’t want to settle down in a conventional marriage. Anjali is in love with her boyfriend, a carefree guy who lacks seriousness. She openly admits her love for him to Buchi Babu, and he, though heartbroken, decides to step aside. Buchi Babu returns to the US, trying to move on from the rejection. A few months later, circumstances bring Buchi Babu and Anjali together again at a friend’s wedding. During this time, Anjali realizes her boyfriend is irresponsible and not the right person for her. She begins to see the kind and caring nature of Buchi Babu. Anjali starts developing feelings for Buchi Babu but struggles to express them. Meanwhile, Buchi Babu remains distant, thinking she is still in love with her ex. A series of humorous and emotional incidents bring them closer, and Anjali finally confesses her love. The film concludes with Buchi Babu and Anjali getting married amidst a grand celebration, signifying the union of two opposites who complement each other perfectly.

== Cast ==
- Sunil as Buchi Babu
- Isha Chawla as Anjali
- Ronson Vincent
- Khaleel as Raja
- Ali as Bachi: Buchi Babu's friend
- Dharmavarapu Subramanyam as B. Parabramham: Buchi Babu's father
- L. B. Sriram as Raja's father
- Ahuti Prasad as Veerraju: Anjali's father
- Ravi Babu as Raja's right-hand
- M. S. Narayana as A visitor to Buchi Babu's friend's wedding
- Tulasi Shivamani as Buchi Babu's mother
- Usha Sri as Anjali's mother
- Giridhar as A visitor to Buchi Babu's friend's wedding
- Vishnupriya as Chaya: Bachi's love interest

== Soundtrack ==
Mr. Pellikoduku

Soundtrack album by S. A. Rajkumar
- Released: 2 February 2013
- Recorded: 2012–2013
- Genre: Feature film soundtrack
- Length: 26:57
- Language: Telugu
- Label: Aditya Music
- Producer: S. A. Rajkumar

S. A. Rajkumar chronology
Mouna Raagam (2010)	Mr. Pellikoduku (2013)

The music was composed by S. A. Rajkumar.

Track listing
No.	Title	Lyrics	Artist(s)	Length
1.	"Musthabai Vasthundi"	Ramajogayya Sastry	Ranjith, Shravya	04:26
2.	"O Meri Siri"	Ramajogayya Sastry	Karthik, Rita, S. A. Rajkumar	04:33
3.	"Nuvvu Naatho"	Vanamali	Udit Narayan, Prem	04:44
4.	"Masthu Masthu"	Bhaskarabhatla	Haricharan, Muralidhar, Geetha Madhuri	04:13
5.	"Maatalu Raani"	Suddala Ashok Teja	Jagadeesh, Ranina Reddy	04:55
6.	"Osini Ne Oni"	Suddala Ashok Teja	Udit Narayan, Shravya	04:03
Total length:				26:57

== Reception ==
Mr. Pellikoduku opened to mixed reviews from the critics. The Hindu gave a review stating "Mr. Pellikoduku is a hotchpotch remake. Re-visit Tanu Weds Manu instead." IBN Live gave a review stating "Mr Pellikoduku, the remake of 'Tanu weds Manu' fails to recreate the magic." The Times of India gave a review stating "Forget Tanu Weds Manu was ever made and you might be able to see the funny side of it all." Sify.com gave a review stating the movie to be a "unsatisfying remake".

Rediff.com gave a review of rating 2/5 stating "Mr Pellikoduku has all the badly written additions woven into it. The music isn't appealing either. The Telugu version sadly fails and scores on no account."
