= Aadi Saikumar =

Indian film actor (born 1989)

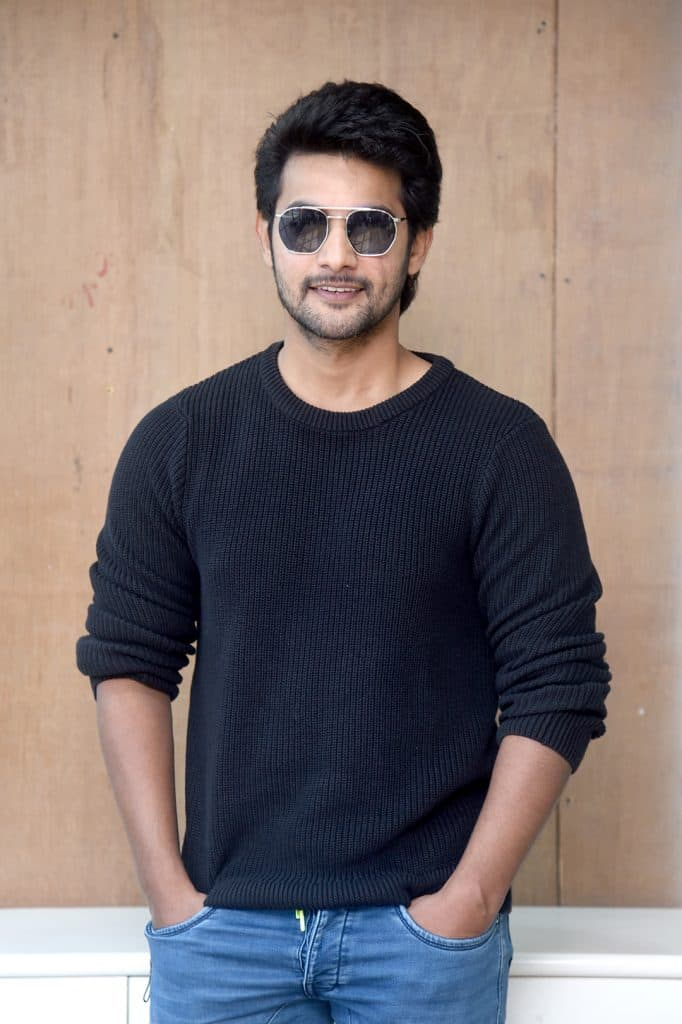
- Aadi in 2023
- Born: Aditya Pudipeddi; 23 December 1989 (age 36); Amudalavalasa, Andhra Pradesh, India
- Other name: Aadi
- Education: Bhavan's Vivekananda College
- Occupation: Actor
- Spouse: Aruna (m. 2014)
- Children: 2
- Father: P. Sai Kumar
- Relatives: P. Ravi Shankar (uncle); Ayyappa P. Sharma (uncle); P. J. Sarma (grandfather)

Aditya Pudipeddi (born 23 December 1989), credited as Aadi Saikumar, is an Indian actor who works in Telugu cinema. Aadi made his debut with Prema Kavali (2011). He won the Filmfare Award for Best Male Debut – South and SIIMA Award for Best Male Debut – Telugu for the film. He went on to be starred in successful films such as Lovely (2012), Sukumarudu (2013), Shamantakamani (2017) and Shambhala (2025).

== Early life ==
Aditya Pudipeddi was born on 23 December 1989 in Amudalavalasa, Srikakulam district, Andhra Pradesh. Son of actor Sai Kumar, Aadi was schooled in Chennai in Devi Academy, Valasaravakkam, till 7th standard and then moved to St. Andrews School in Hyderabad, followed by St Johns for Intermediate and completed his graduation from Bhavan's Vivekananda College. He excelled in studies, and had an inclination towards acting. He was an all-rounder in Cricket and he was selected for the under-19 Ranji Cricket Team. He played under the captaincy of Ambati Rayudu, and Pragyan Ojha, the Indian team player was his roommate during their Sri Lanka trip.

Aadi married Aruna, a software professional from Rajahmundry, in December 2014, and the couple has a daughter and a son

== Career ==
Aadi debuted in 2011 in director K. Vijaya Bhaskar's Prema Kavali. In this love story, he played the role of Srinu, a NCC Cadet who sets out to find the one who tortures his lover, thus trying to regain her heart after a break-up. Oneindia Entertainment commented on his performance stating "Aadi has done his role with good ease and his in dialogue delivery is as good as his father. He is quite comfortable in emoting the love and emotional scenes and he is also good at dances and action scenes. However, he should further improve his body language, as he appeared a little rigid in some scenes. But for a debutant hero, such situations are unavoidable." Aadi won the Hyderabad Times award for Promising Newcomer Male in 2011, CineMAA Awards (2012) for best Debut Actor of 2012 and Filmfare Awards South (2012) for Best Male Debut – South of 2011.

His next release was director B. Jaya's Lovely (2012), released on 30 March 2012. He played the role of Akash, a jovial person who hates father-daughter relationships, but starts respecting it after he meets with the father of the girl he loves. The film completed a hundred-day run on 7 July 2012 in 12 centres. Aadi starred in Sukumarudu which was released on 4 May 2013 and was moderately successful. He then starred in Rough, directed by C. H. Subba Reddy.

== Filmography ==
Key
†	Denotes films that have not yet been released

Year	Title	Role	Notes	Ref.
2011	Prema Kavali	Srinu		
2012	Lovely	Akash		
2013	Sukumarudu	Sukumar		
2014	Pyar Mein Padipoyane	Chandra	Also singer for the song "Chinna Pillalu"	
2014	Galipatam	Karthi		
2014	Rough	Chandhu		
2016	Garam	Varala Babu		
2016	Chuttalabbai	Recovery Babji		
2017	Samanthakamani	Karthik		
2017	Next Nuvve	Kiran		
2019	Burra Katha	Abhiram "Abhi / Ram"		
2019	Jodi	Kapil		
2019	Operation Gold Fish	Arjun Pandit		
2021	Sashi	Rajkumar "Raj"		
2022	Athidi Devo Bhava	Abhay Ram		
2022	Black	Vikramaditya "Aditya" Dharmaraj		
2022	Tees Maar Khan	Tees Maar Khan		
2022	Crazy Fellow	Abhiram "Nani"		
2022	Top Gear	Arjun		
2023	CSI Sanatan	Sanatan		
2025	Shanmukha	Karthi Vallabhan		
2025	Shambhala	Vikram		
2026	SI Yugandhar	Yugandhar		
TBA	Sairabanu †		Filming	
2026	Ego raja	sethu	releasing soon	

=== Television ===
Year	Title	Role	Network
2023	Puli Meka	Dr. Prabhakar Sharma	ZEE5

== Awards and nominations ==
List of awards and nominations
Year	Award	Category	Film	Result	Ref.
2011	Hyderabad Times Film Awards	Promising Newcomer (Male)	Prema Kavali	Nominated	
2012	CineMAA Awards	Best Debut Actor	Prema Kavali	Won	
2012	Filmfare Awards South	Best Male Debut	Prema Kavali	Won	
2012	South Indian International Movie Awards	Best Male Debut – Telugu	Prema Kavali	Won	
