= Suma Bhattacharya =

British actress

- Born: London, England
- Occupations: Fintech entrepreneur; investment banker; actress; model
- Years active: 2010–2011

Suma Bhattacharya is a fintech entrepreneur, model, dancer and film actress. Since 2011 she is a Fintech Entrepreneur having co-founded the payments technology company LivQuik technologies in India. And now leads fintech companies in the UK at exec level. She started her career with Credit Suisse in London as an Analyst. Currently she is based out of Mumbai and works as a senior analyst at Samena Capital, a Hong Kong–based hedge fund. She began modeling soon after and was a finalist in the Miss India World competition (2008) and was crowned Miss India UK (2008). She became an actress thereafter.

She is also a Kathak dancer and has performed professionally at various venues in the UK including the Royal Albert Hall.

She first appeared in a Bollywood telefilm Like I Love You, produced by Shahrukh Khan's production house Red Chillies Entertainment, following which she debuted in Telugu with Kudirithe Cup Coffee, directed by Rama Selva, pairing with Varun Sandesh. She then completed working on her debut Tamil film, Muran, featuring alongside director-actor Cheran and Prasanna.

== Filmography ==
| Year | Film | Role | Language | Notes |
|---|---|---|---|---|
| 2010 | Like I Love You | | Hindi | Telefilm |
| 2011 | Kudirithe Cup Coffee | Lasya | Telugu | |
| 2011 | Muran | Linda | Tamil | |
