= Shelly Kishore =

Indian actress (born 1983)

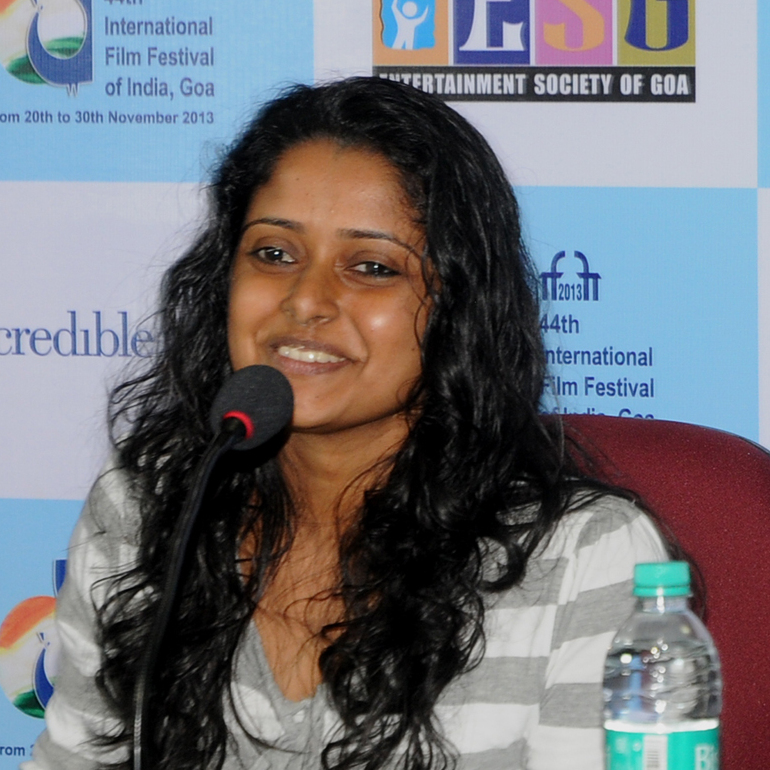
- Kishore in 2013
- Born: Shelly Nabu Kumar; Dubai, United Arab Emirates
- Occupation: Actress
- Years active: 2006–present

Shelly Kishore is an Indian actress who works in Malayalam and Tamil films and television. She is known for her roles in Kumkumapoovu, Thanga Meenkal and Minnal Murali. She received a Kerala state television award for best actress in 2006.

== Early life ==
Shelly's father, J. Nabu Kumar, works a civil engineer in Dubai, United Arab Emirates. Her mother Sheela is a homemaker. She has an elder brother and a sister. Shelly's brother is married and lives in the US. Her sister, Shibily earns as a teacher.

Shelly studied in Muscat and in New Indian Model School, Dubai. She has a diploma in mass media and communication from Singapore and another diploma in sociology. Shelly did her Post Graduation in E-Governance.

== Career ==
Shelly Kishore received the Government of Kerala's award for the best actress in 2006 for her role in the serial Thaniye, telecasted in Amrita TV. Shelly's first Malayalam movie was Kerala Cafe, directed by Shankar Ramakrishnan. Shelly's first Tamil movie was Thanga Meenkal, directed by Ram. Shelly appeared the Hindi movie The Waiting Room, directed by Maneej Premnath. She learned classic Indian dance forms, including Mohiniyattam, Kuchipudi, and Bharatanatyam.

Shelly was selected as the second runner up for the Miss Flower Show contest held at Kanakakunnu, Trivandrum. Shelly acted in the Malayalam movie Kanalkannadi directed by Jayan Poduval, although it was never released. Kishore is famous in Malayali households for her portrayal of Shalini Rudran in Kumkumapoovu. After finishing that production, she took a break from television. In 2017 she came back through the portrayal of Balasuda in Sthreepadam.

== Filmography ==
- All films are in Malayalam, otherwise noted

List of Shelly Kishore film credits
Year	Title	Role	Notes	Ref
2009	Kerala Cafe	School girl	Segment: Island Express	
2010	The Waiting Room	Girl killed	Hindi film	
2012	Chattakaari	Usha		
2013	Akam	Tara		
2013	Thanga Meenkal	Vadivu	Tamil film	
2017	Sakhavu	Maya		
2018	Eeda	Leela		
2021	Minnal Murali	Usha		
2022	Naane Varuvean	Janaki	Tamil film	
2022	Padachonte Kadhakal	Devaki		
2023	Kanal Kannadi	Anamika	Late Release via YouTube	
2024	Oru Sarkar Ulpannam	Shyama		
2024	Swakaryam Sambhava Bahulam	Ambili		
2025	Narayaneente Moonnaanmakkal	Nafeesa		
2025	Madras Matinee	Kamalam	Tamil film; credited as Shelly	
2026	Modha Rathri	Selvi	Tamil film	

== Television ==
List of Shelly Kishore television credits
Year	Title	Role	Channel	Notes
2006	Koottu Kudumbam	–	Kairali TV	Debut serial
2006	Thaniye	Padma	Amrita TV	Telefilm
2006	Chitrasalabham	Nandana & Sitara	Amrita TV	
2007	Thingalum Tharangalum	Raziya	Amrita TV	
2007	Aa Amma	–	Kairali TV	
2011–2014	Kumkumapoovu	Shalini	Asianet	
2013	Parasparam	Shalini	Asianet	Guest appearance
2016	Chirakinte Maravil	Susan	YouTube	short film
2017–2020	Sthreepadham	Balasudha	Mazhavil Manorama	
2020–2021	Ente Maathavu	Jeena	Surya TV	
2023	Shaitan	Savithri	Disney+ Hotstar	Telugu web series

== Awards ==
List of Shelly Kishore awards and nominations
Year	Ceremony	Category	Serial/Movie	Role	Result
2006	Kerala State Television Awards	Best Actress	Thaniye	Padma	Won
2012	Asianet Television Awards	Best New Face	Kumkumapoovu	Shalini	Won
2013	Asianet Television Awards	Best Actress	Kumkumapoovu	Shalini	Won
2013	Asiavision Television Awards	Best Actress	Kumkumapoovu	Shalini	Won
2014	3rd South Indian International Movie Awards | Best Actress in a Supporting Role	Thanga Meengal	Vadivu	Nominated	
