= Vinayakudu (film) =

- Directed by: Sai Kiran Adivi
- Written by: Sai Kiran Adivi
- Produced by: Saritha Patra
- Starring: Krishnudu; Sonia; Poonam Kaur; Samrat Reddy
- Cinematography: P. G. Vinda
- Edited by: Marthand K. Venkatesh
- Music by: Sam Prasan
- Release date: 21 November 2008
- Country: India
- Language: Tamil Telugu

Vinayakudu is a 2008 Indian Telugu-language romantic drama film written and directed by Sai Kiran Adivi. The film stars Krishnudu and Sonia of Happy Days fame in the lead roles and Poonam Kaur plays the role of Sonia's friend. The film released on 21 November 2008 to critical and commercial acclaim. The film is about a fat man falling in love with an arrogant woman.

The film was partially re-shot in Tamil by Balasekaran as Vinayaga with extra scenes filmed with Santhanam and released on 6th January 2012. It spawned a sequel titled Village Lo Vinayakudu with Krishnudu. In 2020, Adivi expressed interest in remaking the film in Hindi.

== Plot ==
Karthik (Krishnudu), a soft, ever-happy kind of guy, comes to Hyderabad for a job interview at Hi-Rise, an ad agency. He gets selected, and in the office the next day, he sees Kalpana (Sonia) and likes her. He's generally not taken seriously by anyone because of his soft-spoken nature and his rotund personality, but he's the kind who doesn't take that seriously! Kalpana too doesn't care for him and finds faults with him, due to their initial interactions at work. Slowly though, she starts interacting with him more. Her parents, who leave to USA to visiting her brother's family (Mahesh & Aparna), initiate a matrimonial alliance for Kalpana with Rajeev (Samrat Reddy). Kalpana meets Rajeev and they both observe that they have a lot of tastes in common. Meanwhile, another thread of a budding relation is seen between Karthik's friend Altaf (Suryatej) and Kalpana's friend Sandhya a.k.a. Sandy (Poonam Kaur). At about the same time that Kalpana realizes Rajeev is not for her, she gets closer to Karthik but the hell gets loose suddenly due to a petty altercation between Altaf and Sandy. Eventually, Karthik and Kalpana lose even the friendly relation they have. What's the big fat love story then and how it evolves forms the rest of the story.

== Cast ==
- Krishnudu as Karthik
- Sonia Deepti as Kalpana
- Poonam Kaur as Sandhya
- Samrat Reddy as Rajeev
- Suryatej as Altaf
- Ankitha as Shalini
- Mahesh as Mahesh
- Satya Krishnan as Aparna
- Prem Kumar Patra as Karthik's boss
- Adarsh Balakrishna as Ananth Naidu
- Tulasi as Karthik's boss' wife
- Rakesh Mahnkali
- Sai Kiran Adivi as Doctor
- Waheedha as Madhavi

Tamil version

- Santhanam as Senthil, Aparna's brother-in-law
- Cool Suresh as Auto driver
- Kili Ramachandran as Apartment resident
- Chinrasu as Apartment resident

== Production ==
Sonia Deepti was first cast after director Sai Kiran Adivi was impressed with her performance in Happy Days (2007). Adivi worked as an assistant director for Happy Days where he got to know actor Krishnudu, who was signed to make his lead debut after Adivi's assistant Sekhar recommended him. Poonam Kaur was cast in an important role.

== Soundtrack ==
Vinayakudu

Soundtrack album
- Recorded: 2008
- Genre: Feature film soundtrack
- Producer: Sam Prasan

The soundtrack of the film was scored by Sam Prasan.

| Track | Song | Singer(s) | Lyricist | Duration (min:sec) |
|---|---|---|---|---|
| 1 | "Hum Hain Hyderabadi" | Hema Chandra | Avinash | 3:33 |
| 2 | "Saradaga Ee Samayam" | Chitra, P. Unnikrishnan | Vanamali | 4:37 |
| 3 | "Varaveena" | Raghu, Hema Chandra, Sridevi & Sahithi | Avinash | 3:52 |
| 4 | "Naalo Vedane" | Kunal Ganjawala | Avinash | 5:02 |
| 5 | "Varaveena" | Instrumental | | 3:38 |
| 6 | "Naalo Vedane" | Instrumental | | 5:03 |

== Reception ==
Radhika Rajamani of Rediff called the film "an okay watch" while praising the lead pair's performances.

== Awards ==
Nandi Awards - 2008

- Second Best Feature Film - Silver - Prem Patra
- Best Debut Director - Sai Kiran Adivi
