= Villagelo Vinayakudu =

- Directed by: Sai Kiran Adivi
- Written by: Sai Kiran Adivi
- Story by: Mahi V. Raghav
- Produced by: Mahi V. Raghav
- Starring: Krishnudu; Saranya Mohan; Rao Ramesh; Yandamuri Veerendranath
- Cinematography: Ramana Salwa
- Edited by: Marthand K. Venkatesh
- Music by: Manikanth Kadri
- Release date: 5 November 2009
- Country: India
- Language: Telugu

Villagelo Vinayakudu (transl. Vinayakudu in the Village) is a 2009 Telugu-language comedy film produced by Mahi V Raghav, written, and directed by Sai Kiran Adivi. The film is a sequel to the 2008 hit, Vinayakudu. Krishnudu reprises his role as Karthik in this film, whilst Saranya Mohan plays the female lead, and Rao Ramesh plays the role of her father. Telugu novel writer Yandamuri Veerendranath makes his acting debut in a small but vital role. The film was released on 5 November 2009 and received positive reviews.

== Plot ==
Karthik (Krishnudu) is a teacher by profession and falls in love with a medico Kavya (Sharanya Mohan). Kavya's father Colonel Lakshmipati (Rao Ramesh) is a retired army officer living in a farmhouse in the village, with his brothers and family. Kavya loses her mother at young age, so her father has never refused her wishes. When she musters courage to tell her father about her love, Karthik comes to her home all of a sudden. He tells Lakshmipati that he is in love with his daughter. Lakshmipati is dead set against the marriage and does not want this stout guy for a son-in-law. Lakshmipati's friend Bhaskaram (Yandamuri) further complicates Krishnudu's prospects with some silly ideas. Rest of the drama is how Krishnudu wins the heart of Lakshmipati.

== Cast ==
- Krishnudu as Karthik
- Saranya Mohan as Kavya
- Rao Ramesh as Colonel Lakshmipati
- Yandamuri Veerendranath as Bhaskaram
- Bharath Reddy as Bharath Verma
- Sandhya Janak

== Marketing ==
Producers of the film partnered with 98.3 FM Radio Mirchi, TV9, Gemini Music, Meraux Animations, APTDC, Kalamandir, and Reliance Mobile. On 29 October 2009, the crew of the film had a publicity road trip from Hyderabad to Visakhapatnam to Vijayawada, promoting the film to people.

== Soundtrack ==
The soundtrack and background score is composed by Manikanth Kadri. The music was released on 15 September 2009 at Kalamandir, Kukatpally, Hyderabad. The audio rights of the soundtrack were purchased by Madhura Entertainment. Each CD was priced at Rs. 9.98. A Reliance GSM SIM card came with each CD as a marketing strategy by the producer.

Villagelo Vinayakudu

Soundtrack album by Manikanth Kadri
- Released: 15 September 2009
- Recorded: 2009
- Genre: Feature film soundtrack
- Length: 28:28
- Label: Madhura Audio
- Producer: Manikanth Kadri

Manikanth Kadri chronology
Avakai Biryani (2008)	Villagelo Vinayakudu (2009)	Savaari (2009)

All tracks are written by Vanamali.

Track-List
No.	Title	Artist(s)	Length
1.	"Chinukai Varadai"	Hariharan, Shweta Mohan	04:49
2.	"Aha Naa Pellanta"	Baba Sehgal, Manikanth Kadri, Soumya Sharma, Colin Terence	02:42
3.	"Muddugaare"	Guru Priya	03:39
4.	"Neeli Meghama"	Karthik	04:28
5.	"Theese Prati Swasa"	Haricharan	03:08
6.	"Superman"	Benny Dayal	03:07
7.	"Theme Music (Violin)"	Karthik Iyer	02:59
8.	"Muddugaare"	Sooraj	03:36
Total length:			28:28

== Reception ==
Radhika Rajamani of Rediff.com rated the film three out of five stars and wrote, "All in all Village lo Vinayakudu may be a bit slow but it's perfect viewing for the family -- clean and wholesome. It's away from the usual masala and therefore is good to watch". Jeevi of Idlebrain.com also gave the same rating.
