= Sai Kiran Adivi =

Indian Telugu film director and writer

- Born: 11 August 1976 (age 49); Kalidindi, Andhra Pradesh, India
- Occupations: Director, Screenwriter
- Years active: 2008-2019
- Spouse: Adivi Pratibha
- Family: See Adivi Family
- Awards: Nandi Awards (2009)

Sai Kiran Adivi is an Indian Telugu film director and writer.

== Career ==
Sai Kiran first worked as an assistant director to Sekhar Kammula. He made his debut as a director with Vinayakudu (2008), starring Krishnudu in the lead role. His next film was Village Lo Vinayakudu, the sequel to Vinayakudu. In 2015, Sai Kiran Adivi directed a romantic entertainer, Kerintha, which was produced by Dil Raju. His latest movie, Operation Gold Fish, released in October 2019. He is the cousin of actor Adivi Sesh.

== Filmography ==
Year	Film	Director	Writer	Producer	Notes
2008	Vinayakudu	Yes	Yes	No	Directorial debut
2009	Villagelo Vinayakudu	Yes	Yes	Yes	
2013	Kiss	No	Yes	Yes	
2015	Kerintha	Yes	Yes	No	
2019	Operation Gold Fish	Yes	Yes	Yes	
