= Krishnudu =

Indian actor

- Born: Alluri Krishna; July 15, 1975 (age 51); Chintalapalli, Andhra Pradesh, India
- Occupation: Actor
- Years active: 2005–present
- Height: 5' 10''

Alluri Krishna (commonly known as Krishnudu), is an Indian actor in the Telugu film industry.

== Career ==
Originally from a farmer background from Rajavolu, Krishnudu received his diploma in automobile engineering from Bengaluru. Interested in acting in cinema, he left for Hyderabad but an injury in his leg caused him to gain weight and he was immobile for two years. He worked as a fashion photographer alongside Subi Samuel in Mumbai before returning to Hyderabad, where he established his own photo studio The Faces in 1999 and worked on films like Gangotri, Appudappudu and Puri Jagannadh's films. He worked as an assistant director for Bhageeratha (2004).

He has mostly done supporting roles until Vinayakudu, where he played the lead role. He is currently affiliated with YSRCP party as of 2018.

== Filmography ==
- Note: All films are in Telugu, unless otherwise noted.

=== Films ===
Year	Title	Role	Notes
2005	Modati Cinema		
2006	Manodu		
2006	Veedhi	Gangster	
2006	Shock	Sekhar's friend	
2006	Party	Doctor	
2006	Pokiri	Pandu's friend	
2007	Premalekha Rasa		
2007	Madhumasam	Sanjay's friend	
2007	Happy Days	Bandodu	
2008	Vaana	Mani	
2008	Yuvatha	Suribabu	
2008	Vinayakudu	Kartik	Debut as lead actor; partially reshot in Tamil as Vinayaga
2009	Oy!	Fatso	
2009	Ninnu Kalisaka	Chanti	
2009	Villagelo Vinayakudu	Kartik	
2009	Arya 2		
2010	Ye Maaya Chesaave	Himself	
2010	Sneha Geetham	Pitamaha	
2010	Pappu	Pappu	
2010	Koti Mooka	Ramana	
2010	Amayakudu	Krishna	
2010	Mango		
2011	Katha Screenplay Darshakatvam Appalaraju	Banda	
2011	Vykuntapali	Chandu	
2011	Mr. Perfect	Krishna	
2011	Veera	Anji	
2011	Brahmi Gadi Katha	Pandu	
2011	Mogudu		
2011	Naaku O Loverundi	Krishna Sastry	
2012	Nippu	Subbu	
2012	Yeto Vellipoyindhi Manasu	Prakash	
2012	Ramadandu		
2013	Bullabbai		
2013	Mr. Manmadha	Madan	
2013	Dalam	Veerabhadram	Simultaneously shot in Tamil
2013	Turum		
2014	Chandamama Kathalu	G. Venkateshwera Rao	
2014	Brindavanamlo Gopika	Krishnudu	
2014	Vishnu Moorti	Lord Vishnu	
2014	Manam	Doctor	
2014	Ram Bhai Bheem Bhai		
2014	Erra Bus		
2015	Gopala Gopala	Ottu	
2015	365 Days		
2015	Ram Leela		
2015	Jyothi Lakshmi		
2016	Jayammu Nischayammu Raa	Rani's brother	
2016	Dr. Prasad c/o Sitara		
2017	Fashion Designer s/o Ladies Tailor		
2017	Hello	Pani Puri seller	
2019	Hulchul	Rudra's friend	
2024	Vettaiyan	Srinivasa Rao	Tamil film
2024	Laggam	Ganesh	
2025	Game Changer	Mall Malleshwarao	
2025	Shanmukha	Subrahmanyam	
2026	Bad Boy Karthik		

=== TV series ===
- Yuva (Star Maa)
- Gangato Ram Babu (Zee Telugu)
- Bigg Boss (Telugu TV Series) season 10
