= Nandi Awards of 2006 =

Indian Telugu film and TV awards ceremony

The Nandi Awards are presented annually in Andhra Pradesh, For Telugu cinema by State government. "Nandi" means "bull", the awards being named after the big granite bull at Lepakshi — a cultural and historical symbol of Andhra Pradesh. Nandi Awards are presented in four categories: Gold, Silver, Bronze, and Copper.

The Nandi awards for the year 2006 were announced on 12 February 2008 at Hyderabad.

== Nandi Awards 2006 Winners List ==
Category	Winner	Film
Best Feature Film	Dil Raju	Bommarillu
Second Best Feature Film	G. V. G. Raju	Godavari
Third Best Feature Film	Ganga	Ganga
Nandi Award for Akkineni Award for best home-viewing feature film	Konda Krishnam Raju	Sri Ramadasu
Best Popular Film for Providing Wholesome Entertainment	Puri Jagannadh	Pokiri
Best Actor	Nagarjuna	Sri Ramadasu
Best Actress	Nandita Das	Kamli
Best Supporting Actor	Prakash Raj	Bommarillu
Best Supporting Actress	Easwari Rao	Ganga
Best Villain	Sai Kumar	Samanyudu
Best Male Comedian	Venu Madhav	Lakshmi
Best Female Comedian	Abhinayasri	Paisalo Paramathma
Best Child Actor	Master Raghava	Style
Best Child Actress	Divyasri	Bharathi
Best Character Actor	Kota Srinivasa Rao	Pellaina Kothalo
Best Children's Film	Bharathi	Bharathi
Second Best Children's Film	Kittu	Kittu
Best Director for a Children's Film	RS Raju	Bharathi
Best Director	Sekhar Kammula	Godavari
Best First Film of a Director	Bhaskar	Bommarillu
Best Screenplay Writer	Bhaskar	Bommarillu
Best Story Writer	Ravi C Kumar	Samanyudu
Best Dialogue Writer	Abburi Ravi	Bommarillu
Best Lyricist	Andesri	Ganga
Best Cinematographer	Vijay C. Kumar	Godavari
Best Music Director	K. M. Radha Krishnan	Godavari
Best Male Playback Singer	K. J. Yesudas	Ganga
Best Female Playback Singer	Sunitha	Godavari
Best Editor	Marthand K. Venkatesh	Pokiri
Best Art Director	Ashok Koralath	Pournami
Best Choreographer	Raghava Lawrence	Style
Best Audiographer	Radhakrishna Eskala	Pokiri
Best Costume Designer	Basha	Sri Ramadasu
Best Fight Master	Vijay	Pokiri
Best Film Critic on Telugu Cinema	Challa Srinivas	
Best Male Dubbing Artist	P. Ravi Shankar	
Best Female Dubbing Artist	Savitha Reddy	Bommarillu
Best Special Effects	Spirit Media	Sainikudu
Special Jury Award	Genelia	Bommarillu
Special Jury Award	Naga Babu	Stalin
Special Jury Award	Gangaraju Gunnam	Amma Cheppindi

== See also ==
- Nandi Awards of 2010
- Nandi Awards of 2011
