= Anand Sai =

Indian art director

- Born: Parlakimidi
- Education: Interior Design
- Occupation: Art Director
- Spouse: Vasuki Anand
- Children: 2
- Father: B. Chalam

Anand Sai is an art director who works primarily in Telugu cinema. He received the Tamil Nadu State Film Award for Best Art Director for his work in New (2004).

== Education and career ==
Sai was born in Kaviti, Andhra Pradesh on the Andhra-Odisha border into a Telugu-speaking family. His father came to Madras in 1950 to be an art director in the Tamil, Telugu, Kannada, and Malayalam shared film industries. He studied interior design in Chennai and worked in event management for a while before getting into the film industry. Since then he has worked in over 50 movies. In his first movie he recreated the Taj Mahal on the seashore for Pawan Kalyan's Tholi Prema. He went on to worked on sets for over 40 films. This has translated into wedding sets designed for leading business houses and stars of Telugu cinema.

All the sets he designs are constructed in accordance with vaastu as he feels more comfortable if they are done that way. He also suggests the lighting scheme for his sets and discusses with the cinematographer to enhance the quality of the output. He has also forayed into advertisements with brands like Pepsi, Amruthanjan, and Fair & Lovely. He received the Tamil Nadu State Film Award for Best Art Director for his work in New (2004).

He was the chief architect for the Lakshmi Narasimha Temple, Yadadri temple near Bhuvanagiri, Telangana. He has been working full time on the project since 2016. The designs comply with Agama Shastra.

== Personal life ==
Anand Sai is married to actress Vasuki Anand, who acted in a supporting role in Tholi Prema (1998) as Pawan Kalyan's younger sister and Ramany vs Ramany; They have two children. Anand Sai is a very close friend of Pawan Kalyan and has even accompanied him to his political events.

== Filmography ==
Key
†	Denotes films that have not yet been released

=== As art director ===
Year	Film	Notes
1998	Tholi Prema	Debut
1999	Thammudu	
2002	Vasu	
2003	Naaga	
2003	Johnny	
2003	Simhadri	
2003	Tagore	
2004	Naani	
2004	New	Tamil film; Tamil version of Naani
2004	Gudumba Shankar	
2004	Sye	
2005	Balu	
2005	Narasimhudu	
2005	Anbe Aaruyire	Tamil film
2005	Jai Chiranjeeva	
2006	Devadasu	
2006	Chukkallo Chandrudu	
2006	Bangaram	
2006	Boss	
2006	Sainikudu	
2006	Annavaram	
2007	Munna	
2007	Yamadonga	
2008	Okka Magadu	
2008	Jalsa	
2008	Parugu	
2008	Rainbow	
2008	Hero	
2009	Mitrudu	
2009	Boni	
2009	Saleem	
2010	Adhurs	
2010	Komaram Puli	
2010	Khaleja	
2010	Brindavanam	
2010	Orange	
2011	Shakthi	
2011	Badrinath	
2012	Nippu	
2012	Rachcha	
2012	Dammu	
2013	Naayak	
2026	Ustaad Bhagat Singh	
