= Ramesh Babu =

Indian actor (1965–2022)

- Born: Ghattamaneni Ramesh Babu; 13 October 1965; Madras, Tamil Nadu, India
- Died: 8 January 2022 (aged 56); Hyderabad, India
- Other name: G. Ramesh Babu
- Occupations: Actor; film producer
- Years active: 1974–1981 (as a child actor); 1987–1997 (as actor); 2004–2022 (as producer)
- Spouse: Mrudula
- Children: 2
- Father: Krishna
- Relatives: Mahesh Babu (brother); Manjula Swaroop (sister)

Ghattamaneni Ramesh Babu (13 October 1965 – 8 January 2022) was an Indian actor and film producer, who was known for his work in Telugu cinema. Babu made his on screen debut with the film Alluri Seetharama Raju in 1974. He acted in over 15 films before retiring from acting in 1997. In 2004, he became a producer and established Krishna Productions Private Ltd, a film production company named after his father, actor Krishna. He produced films like Arjun and Athidhi, both of which feature his younger brother Mahesh Babu in the leading role. One of his last roles was as a presenter for the 2011 film, Dookudu.

== Early life ==
Ramesh Babu was born on 13 October 1965 in Chennai, Tamil Nadu to prominent Telugu film actor Krishna and his first wife Indira Devi. He was their first-born child. He has three younger sisters, actress-producer Manjula Ghattamaneni, Padmavathi and Priyadarsini and one younger brother, Mahesh Babu an actor in Telugu Cinema.

== Career ==
=== Acting career ===
In 1977, Ramesh Babu ventured into films as a child actor at the age of 12 with his father's film Manushulu Chesina Dongalu. After two years, at the age of 14, he was cast in a vital role in the film Needa, which was directed by Dasari Narayana Rao. The film also had his four-year-old brother, Mahesh Babu in a small role. After that, he took a brief hiatus from acting. In 1987, he made his comeback as a lead actor with the film Samraat, directed by V. Madhusudhana Rao. The film had Sonam paired alongside Ramesh and Sharada in a vital role. In 1988, he was seen in films such as Jandhyala's Chinni Krishnudu, A. Kodandarami Reddy's Bazaar Rowdy and in Kaliyuga Karnudu and Mugguru Kodukulu, both directed by his father. Mugguru Kodukulu also had his father and brother acting alongside him. Bazaar Rowdy became a blockbuster and giving Ramesh his first success as a solo hero. In 1989, he was seen in Dasari Narayana Rao's Black Tiger and V. Madhusudhana Rao's Krishna Gaari Abbayi. In 1990, he was seen in K. Murali Mohan Rao's Ayudham and S. S. Ravichandra's Kaliyuga Abhimanyudu. In 1991, he was seen in Naa Ille Naa Swargam, also starring his father. In 1993, he once again collaborated with Dasari Narayana Rao for the film Maama Kodalu and was also seen in Anna Chellelu opposite Aamani. In 1994, he was seen for the last time in a leading role in the film Pacha Thoranam. The film was directed by Adurthi Saibhaskar and had Rambha acting opposite Ramesh. In 1997, he was seen in a supporting role in N. Shankar's Encounter.

=== Film producer ===
In 2004, Ramesh Babu established a film production company named Krishna Productions Private Ltd in Hyderabad. He named the company after his father and ventured into film production with the film Arjun. Directed by Gunasekhar and starring his brother Mahesh Babu, Shriya Saran, Keerthi Reddy, Raja, Prakash Raj and Saritha, the film was successful at the box office and completed its 100-day theatrical run in 6 centres. His production house was praised for the ₹ 40 million worth Meenakshi Amman Temple set that was built by Thotta Tharani for the film. His next production venture was Athidhi. Directed by Surender Reddy, the film once again had his brother Mahesh Babu in lead role. Amrita Rao was paired opposite Mahesh and Murali Sharma in a negative role. For Athidhi, Ramesh Babu's production house collaborated with UTV Motion Pictures to produce the film. This was the first time a corporate company entered into Telugu film production. The film opened to negative reviews and failed at the box office. In 2011, Babu was seen as a presenter for the film Dookudu.

== Personal life and death ==
Ramesh Babu died from the effects of liver disease on 8 January 2022, at the age of 56, in Hyderabad, India.

== Filmography ==
=== As actor ===
Year	Title	Role(s)	Notes
1974	Alluri Seetaramaraju	Young Alluri Seetaramaraju	Debut Child artist
1977	Dongalaku Donga	Young Gopi	
1977	Manushulu Chesina Dongalu	Young Bhavani Prasad	
1978	Annadammula Saval	Young Kishore	
1979	Needa		
1981	Paalu Neelu		
1987	Samrat	Samrat	Debut
1988	Chinni Krishnudu	Bharat	
1988	Bazaar Rowdy	Ranjith	
1988	Kaliyuga Karnudu	Ravindra	
1988	Mugguru Kodukulu	Rajendra	
1989	Black Tiger	Kranti	
1989	Krishna Gaari Abbayi	Mahesh & Ramesh	Dual role
1990	Ayudam	Benerjee	
1990	Kaliyuga Abhimanyudu	Ravi	
1991	Shanti Enathu Shanti	Raja	Tamil film
1991	Naa Illee Naa Swargam	Vijay	
1993	Mama Kodalu		
1993	Anna Chellelu	Ravi	
1994	Pacha Thoranam	Venu	
1997	Encounter	Suryam	Supporting role

=== As producer ===
Year	Title	Director	Language	Notes
1999	Sooryavansham	E. V. V. Satyanarayana	Hindi	Executive producer
2004	Arjun	Gunasekhar	Telugu	
2007	Athidhi	Surender Reddy	Telugu	In collaboration with UTV Motion Pictures
2011	Dookudu	Srinu Vaitla	Telugu	Presenter
2014	Aagadu	Srinu Vaitla	Telugu	Presenter
