= Bhanu Sri Mehra =

Indian actress

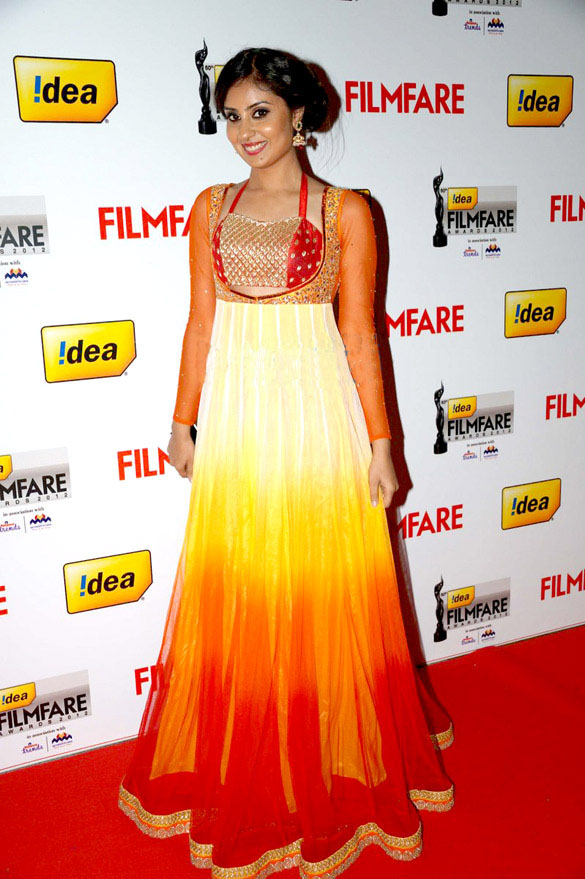
- Bhanu Sri Mehra at 60th South Filmfare Awards 2013
- Born: Amritsar, India
- Other names: Bhanushree Mehra, Bhanu Mehra
- Occupations: Actress, model
- Years active: 2010–present
- Spouse: Karan Manas

Bhanu Sri Mehra is an Indian actress who has appeared in Telugu, Tamil and Punjabi films.

== Career ==
Hailing from Amritsar, Punjab, Bhanu Sri finished her schooling in Dehradun, Uttarakhand and moved to Mumbai, Maharashtra to pursue her graduation in Mass Media. She then started modelling for commercials and print ads.

She made her debut in Gunasekhar's Varudu, which featured her alongside Allu Arjun and Arya. Prior to release, the film opted not to show any promotional material of Bhanu Sri to keep in line with the film, where Allu Arjun's character only sees her face at their wedding. The film opened to mixed reviews and was a box office bomb. The film's failure meant that she went unnoticed and did not get a lead role in a high-profile Telugu film subsequently. Before Varudu, she had done a cameo in the Bollywood film Bachna Ae Haseeno.

Bhanu Sri later went on to play the second lead in the Tamil film Udhayan alongside Arulnithi and Pranitha, which failed to achieve success, too. While she appeared in secondary characters mostly in low-profile Telugu and Tamil films in the following years, she landed starring roles in three films in the Punjabi language, her mother tongue. She also shot for a Hindi film titled Boyss Toh Boyss Hain. Several Telugu projects, including Chilkur Balaji, Prematho Cheppana, Maharaja Sri Galigadu, Lingadu-Ramalingadu, and Antha Nee Mayalone, all films she had started filming for, did not see a theatrical release. In 2015, she signed up a new Tamil film, Simba, which would see her playing a news reporter. She has completed her first Kannada film, Deal Raja, too.

== Filmography ==
Year	Film	Role	Language	Notes
2008	Bachna Ae Haseeno	Mahi's friend	Hindi	Uncredited role
2010	Varudu	Deepthi	Telugu	
2011	Udhayan	Manimegalai	Tamil	
2012	Ding Dong Bell		Telugu	
2013	Boyss Toh Boyss Hain	Twinkle	Hindi	
2013	Fer Mamla Gadbad Gadbad	Roop	Punjabi	
2014	Oh My Pyo	Surveen	Punjabi	
2014	Govindudu Andarivadele	Kausalya	Telugu	Guest role
2014	Brother of Bommali	Uma Devi	Telugu	
2014	Vizhi Moodi Yosithaal	Megha	Tamil	
2014	Ala Ela		Telugu	
2015	Punjabian Da King		Punjabi	
2016	Deal Raja		Kannada	
2019	Simba	Madhu	Tamil	
2020	Run	Rosy	Telugu	
2020	Miss India	Sahana	Telugu	Netflix film
2021	Maro Prasthanam		Telugu	
2022	10th Class Diaries		Telugu	
