= Ramany vs Ramany 3.0 =

- Release poster
- Genre: Sitcom; Comedy
- Created by: Kavithalayaa Productions
- Written by: Gopu Babu; Bharat Gopu; Vigneshwari Suresh; Prashanth
- Directed by: Naga
- Starring: Ram G Vasuki Anand
- Composer: Rehaan
- Country of origin: India
- Original language: Tamil
- No. of seasons: 3
- No. of episodes: 12

Production
- Producers: Pushpa Kandaswamy; Kandaswamy Bharathan
- Cinematography: N. Sathish Kumar
- Editors: Ramamoorthy S T.Ravikumar
- Running time: 20-27 minutes
- Production company: Min Bimbangal

Original release
- Network: aha
- Release: 4 March 2022

Ramany vs Ramany 3.0 is a 2022 Indian Tamil-language sitcom comedy television series, produced as an original for Aha Tamil, directed by Naga. Produced by Kavithalayaa Productions the series stars Ram G and Vasuki Anand in the lead roles along with Poovilangu Mohan, Ponni Suresh, Param Guhanesh and Vaidyanathan Padmanabhan. It is a third season of the 1998 Tamil series Ramany vs Ramany. The series premiered on Aha Tamil on 4 March 2022.

== Cast ==
- Ram G as Mr. Ramany
- Vasuki Anand as Mrs. Ramany
- Ponni Suresh as Ragini, Ramanys' daughter
- Param Guhanesh as Ram, Ramanys' son
- Poovilangu Mohan as Mr. Ramany's father
- Vaidyanathan Padmanabhan as Mrs. Ramany's father
- K. Sathyamurthy
- Sriram Krish
- Sudha Pushpa
- Suchitra Ravi
- Elakiya
- Narmadha Veni
- C. Ranganathan as Mr. Ramany's uncle (episode 9 Unwanted guest)

== Production ==
=== Casting ===
Ram G and Vasuki Anand and were cast as Mr and Mrs Ramany, respectively. Ponni Suresh and Param Ganesh were cast as their children.
