= Poovilangu Mohan =

Indian actor

- Born: T. S. Babumohan; 24 October 1956 (age 70)
- Occupation: Actor

Poovilangu Mohan is an Indian film and television actor. He got the sobriquet "Poovilangu" because of his performance in the Tamil film Poovilangu. He has acted in more than 100 movies in supporting roles and played leading parts in many Television serials.

== Partial filmography ==
Actor

Year	Title	Role	Notes
1981	Thanneer Thanneer		credited as Babumohan
1983	Anal Kaatru		credited as Babumohan
1983	Poikkal Kudhirai	Mohan	credited as Balumohan
1984	Poovilangu	Senthil	credited as T. S. Babumohan
1984	Pudhiavan		credited as T. S. Babumohan
1985	Pagal Nilavu		credited as T. S. Babumohan
1986	Punnagai Mannan		credited as Babumohan
1987	Kudumbam Oru Koyil		credited as Babumohan
1987	Kalyana Agathigal		credited as T. S. Babumohan
1992	Vaaname Ellai		
1993	Vedan		
1999	Ninaivirukkum Varai	Doctor	
1999	Poovellam Kettuppar	Association secretary	
1999	Amarkkalam	DCP Ranjith Bose	
2000	Eazhaiyin Sirippil	Thulasi's brother	
2001	Aalavandhan	Vijay and Nandhu's headmaster	
2002	Baba	Doctor	
2003	Anbe Sivam	Grieving father	
2003	Anbe Anbe	Shiva's father	
2003	Alaudin		
2003	Konji Pesalaam		
2005	Vetrivel Sakthivel	Manju's father	
2005	Aanai		
2007	Malaikottai		
2007	Manikanda		
2008	Tharagu		
2009	Aarumugam		
2009	Guru En Aalu		
2011	Vazhi Vidu Kanne Vazhi Vidu		
2015	Andhadhi	Vallarasu	

Dubbing artist

Actor	Film	Language
Sridhar	Manathil Uruthi Vendum	Tamil
Gowtham Sundarajan	Vaaname Ellai	Tamil

== Television ==
Year	Title	Role	Channel	Language
1995	Air Bus / Balachanderin Chinnatirai		Sun TV	Tamil
1997	Ragasiyam	CB-CID officer Rudrapathi	Sun TV	Tamil
1997–1998	Vidathu Karupu	Schoolmaster Varadharajan	Sun TV	Tamil
1998–1999	Sorna Regai	Police Inspector Anwar	Sun TV	Tamil
1998	Jannal - Sila Nijangal Sila Nyayangal		Sun TV	Tamil
1998	Ramany vs Ramany Part 01		Sun TV	Tamil
1998	Aalumagalu		ETV	Telugu
1998–1999	Velagu Needalu		ETV	Telugu
1998–2000	Ganga Yamuna Saraswati		Raj TV	Tamil
1999	Jannal - Adutha Veetu Kavithai		Raj TV	Tamil
1999–2000	Iyanthira Paravai	Police Inspector Anwar	Raj TV	Tamil
2000–2001	Chithi	Marudhappan	Sun TV	Tamil
2000–2001	Edhuvum Nadakkum	Moopar	Raj TV	Tamil
2001	Ramany vs Ramany Part 02	Renigunta Venkatrama Reddy	Raj TV	Tamil
2002–2003	Veetukku Veedu Looty	Palakkad Kasi Viswanatha Harihara Mahadevan	Jaya TV	Tamil
2002–2005	Annamalai	Mandiramoorthy(Kangaaniyar)	Sun TV	Tamil
2005–2006	Malargal	Mohanasundaram	Sun TV	Tamil
2006–2008	Anjali	Chakravarthy	Sun TV	Tamil
2006–2009	Bhandham		Sun TV	Tamil
2008	Thiruvilayadal	Brahma	Sun TV	Tamil
2008–2009	Sivasakthi		Sun TV	Tamil
2009–2012	Uravukku Kai Koduppom	Jothi Krishna	Kalaignar TV	Tamil
2010–2012	Swanthanga Raktha Sambandham	Jyothi Krishna	Maa TV	Telugu
2010–2015	Nadhaswaram	Mayilvahanam	Sun TV	Tamil
2013–2016	Mahabharatham	Veda Vyasa	Sun TV	Tamil
2013–2014	Ranga Vilas		Jaya TV	Tamil
2013–2019	Valli	Azhagamperumal	Sun TV	Tamil
2014	Bhairavi Aavigalukku Priyamanaval	Special appearance	Sun TV	Tamil
2017–2019	Azhagu	Sethuraman	Sun TV	Tamil
2019	Arundhathi	Somasundaram	Sun TV	Tamil
2019–2020	Rettai Roja	Kandhaswamy	Zee Tamil	Tamil
2020–2023	Magarasi	Chidhambaram	Sun TV	Tamil
2020	Chandralekha	Chidhambaram	Sun TV	Tamil
2021	Karma 1	Somasekara Ganapadigal	Bombay Chanakya's FastFlix	Tamil
2021	Karma 2	Somasekara Ganapadigal	Bombay Chanakya's FastFlix	Tamil
2022	Oru Oorla Rendu Rajakumari	Shivashankaran	Zee Tamil	Tamil
2022	Ramany vs Ramany 3.0		aha	Tamil
2022	Karma 3	Somasekara Ganapadigal	Bombay Chanakya's FastFlix	Tamil
2023–2027	Siragadikka Aasai	Annamalai	Colors Tamil	Tamil
2023–2026	Anna	Soundira Pandi	Zee Tamil	Tamil
2024–present	Thayamma Kudumbathaar	Sattanathan	DD Tamil	Tamil
2025	Aadukalam	Govindan	Sun TV	Tamil
