= Manoharam (2000 film) =

2000 Telugu film

- DVD cover
- Directed by: Gunasekhar
- Written by: Story & Screenplay: Gunasekhar; Dialogues: Posani Krishna Murali
- Produced by: Mullapudi Brahmanandam; Sunkara Madhu Murali
- Starring: Jagapati Babu; Laya
- Cinematography: Sekhar V. Joseph
- Edited by: A. Sreekar Prasad
- Music by: Mani Sharma
- Production companies: M.R.C & Melody Combines
- Release date: 13 May 2000
- Running time: 155 minutes
- Country: India
- Language: Telugu

Manoharam (transl. Alluring) is a 2000 Indian Telugu-language-language action drama film directed by Gunasekhar and produced by Mullapudi Brahmanandam and Sunkara Madhu Murali under the M.R.C & Melody Combines banner. It stars Jagapati Babu, Laya and music composed by Mani Sharma. The film won four Nandi Awards.

== Cast ==
- Jagapati Babu as Keshineni Anand Babu
- Laya as Usha
- Chandra Mohan as Usha's father
- Prakash Raj as Srinivasa Murthy
- Mukesh Rishi as Basha
- Mallikarjuna Rao as Anand's neighbour
- L. B. Sriram as Anand's neighbor
- Jenny as Anand's neighbour
- M. S. Narayana as Watchman
- Brahmaji as Govind
- Surya as Ram Prasad
- Jeeva as Mastan
- Sameer Hasan as Anand's brother-in-law
- Jhansi as Anand's younger sister
- Banerjee
- Vinod Bala as Ibrahim
- Rishi
- Siva Satyanarayana
- Indu Anand
- Master Sagar

== Music ==
The film's score was composed by Mani Sharma. Song lyrics were written by Veturi. The soundtrack was released by Mahathi Audio Company.

| No. | Title | Singer(s) | Length |
|---|---|---|---|
| 1. | "Sari Sari Natanala" | Shankar Mahadevan, K.S.Chithra | 4:37 |
| 2. | "Chooda Chakkani" | Hariharan | 4:50 |
| 3. | "Puccha Puvvula" | K. S. Chithra, Parthasarathi | 5:37 |
| 4. | "Mangala Gowri" | Kalpana | 5:39 |
| 5. | "Guppedu Gundela" | K. S. Chithra, S. P. Balasubrahmanyam | 4:50 |
| 6. | "Bharatha Maatha" | K. S. Chithra, Srinivas | 5:05 |
| Total length: | | | 30:38 |

== Awards ==
Nandi Awards

- Third Best Feature Film - Bronze - Mullapudi Brahmanandam & Sunkara Madhu Murali
- Best Actor - Jagapati Babu
- Best Actress - Laya
- Best Editor - A. Sreekar Prasad
