= Summer Holidays (2026 film) =

2026 film by Srikar Nayan

- Theatrical release poster
- Directed by: Srikar Nayan
- Written by: Kondal Rao Addagalla
- Produced by: Dheeraj Mogilineni; Giri Babu Vallabhaneni
- Starring: Rohan Roy; Arun Dev; Khushi; Jaya Sudha; Vasuki Anand
- Cinematography: Sai Prakash Ummadisingu
- Edited by: Santosh Naidu
- Music by: Giri Babu Vallabhaneni
- Production companies: Dheeraj Mogilineni Entertainments; VGB Films
- Release date: 6 November 2026
- Country: India
- Language: Telugu

Summer Holidays is a 2026 Indian Telugu-language children's film directed by Srikar Nayan in his directorial debut. It stars child actors Rohan Roy, Arun Dev and Khushi alongside Jaya Sudha and Vasuki Anand. The plot follows follows RV (Dev), a city boy from Hyderabad who travels to a Godavari village during summer holidays, and forms an unlikely bond with KV (Roy), a local boy who is facing financial hardships.

The film was theatrically released on 06 November 2026, ahead of Diwali festival, and received positive reviews from critics.

== Cast ==
- Rohan Roy as Kasi "KV" Venkateswarulu
- Arun Dev as Ravuri "RV" Venkatesh
- Khushi
- Jaya Sudha as RV's grandmother
- Vasuki Anand as RV's mother
- Rajeev Kanakala as Varma
- Harsha Vardhan
- Ramana Bhargav
- Harshini Koduri as KV's mother
- Mahesh Chintala

== Production ==
When debut director Srikan Narayan first narrated the story to producer Dheeraj Mogilineni, it was titled Summer Friend. However, Mogilineni suggested the title Summer Holidays. The film was shot extensively in Amalapuram, Andhra Pradesh.

== Release ==
=== Theatrical ===
The film was theatrically released on 6 November 2026. It was initially scheduled to be released in May 2026, however, as producer's another film Chennai Love Story was also scheduled to release that time, Summer Holidays was postponed multiple times before releasing on 6 November.

== Reception ==
=== Critical reception ===
The Hindu's Srivathsan Nandadhur gave a positive review for the film and stated that it "charms with its confident performances." Suresh Kavirayani of Cinema Express, said while the story is predictable, director Srikar Nayan deserves appreciation for presenting a simple and heartwarming rural drama.

Shreya Varanasi of The Times of India, rated the film 3/5 stars, opined that while the film had its moments, "the screenplay does not always sustain the warmth of its premise" and several developments were predictable. A reviewer from Eenadu, also echoed the same praising the storyline and performances, while criticizing the screenplay.
