= Shaakuntalam =

2023 film directed by Gunasekhar

- Theatrical release poster
- Directed by: Gunasekhar
- Screenplay by: Gunasekhar
- Dialogue by: Sai Madhav Burra
- Story by: Kalidasa
- Based on: Shakuntala by Kalidasa
- Produced by: Neelima Guna
- Starring: Samantha Ruth Prabhu; Dev Mohan
- Cinematography: Sekhar V. Joseph
- Edited by: Prawin Pudi
- Music by: Mani Sharma
- Production companies: Gunaa Teamworks; Sri Venkateswara Creations
- Distributed by: AA Films
- Release date: 14 April 2023
- Running time: 142 minutes
- Country: India
- Language: Telugu
- Budget: ₹65 crore
- Box office: est. ₹20 crore

Shaakuntalam is a 2023 Indian Telugu-language mythological romantic drama film written and directed by Gunasekhar. It is produced by Neelima Guna under Gunaa Teamworks and distributed by Sri Venkateswara Creations. Based on a popular play Abhignyana Shakuntalam by Kalidasa, the film features Samantha Ruth Prabhu in the title role of Shakuntala and Dev Mohan as Dushyanta, the king of Puru dynasty along with Mohan Babu, Jisshu Sengupta, Madhoo, Gautami, Aditi Balan and Ananya Nagalla in supporting roles. In the film, Shakuntala and King Dushyanta marry, but Dushyanta forgets all about Shakuntala due to a sage's curse.

The project was announced in October 2020 by Gunasekhar. The film's production began in February 2021 at Annapurna Studios in Hyderabad and ended in August 2021. The film was made on a budget of ₹65 crore. It is shot extensively around Hyderabad, including Ramoji Film City, Ananthagiri Hills, and Gandipet Lake.

Shaakuntalam was theatrically released on 14 April 2023 to negative reviews from critics and was a box office failure.

== Plot ==
The movie starts as Menaka leaves the baby near Rishi Kanva's hermitage before returning to heaven. During the summer, King Dushyanta pursued an antelope in the forest, when he was confronted by an ascetic. The ascetic told him that the creature belonged to the ashrama of Kanva, and he was not to violate the sanctity of the land by slaying it. Dushyanta agreed to not kill the antelope, and was encouraged to visit the ashrama. He was told that he would be welcomed by Shakuntala, Kanva's adopted daughter, due to the sage's absence. Upon entering the ashrama, he came across three exquisite girls watering the plants, and became infatuated with Shakuntala, who was one among the trio. After a conversation with the bevy, he learnt that the true parents of Shakuntala were Vishvamitra and Menaka, which made Shakuntala a suitable bride for him due to her Kshatriya parentage. Dushyanta, however, chose not to reveal his identity. The company broke up due to hearing that an elephant was running amok, and Shakuntala grew enamoured of the visitor. The king directed his general to stop the chaos and instruct his men to stay away from the ashrama. He confessed his feelings to his companion and jester Vidushaka, urging him to think of a pretext to stay in the ashrama without arousing suspicion. Fortunately, a few ascetics approached him soon to request him to safeguard their yajna, which he readily accepted. He sent Vidushaka to his capital, and fearing that his friend would be a tattletale, he lied, stating that his feelings for Shakuntala were but a joke. For a time, he watched over the ascetics' yajna. Shankuntala soon confessed her feelings for Dushyanta, and the two were married according to gandharva rites. The king left for the capital, and promised his wife that he would send a suitable guard to escort her to his palace.

In her solitude, Shakuntala was absorbed in thoughts of her husband, due to which she failed to offer the appropriate hospitality to the short-tempered sage, Durvasa. Durvasa cursed her, stating that the man she was thinking of to such an extent that he had been neglected would never remember her. One of Shakuntala's friends, Anasuya, offered an explanation of her friend's absent-mindedness, and sought forgiveness from the sage. Duravasa agreed to offer a concession of the curse, stating that the man would remember her upon the presentation of a token of recognition. Shakuntala's companions did not reveal this curse to her, reasoning that it did not matter; Shakuntala did, after all, have such a token of recognition, so her husband would no doubt recall her. Kanva returned to his ashrama, and offered his consent for the marriage. The curse took effect, and Dushyanta lost all memory of Shakuntala. When Shakuntala started to show signs of pregnancy, Kanva decided to send her to her lawful husband, explaining to her the duties of a wife and a daughter-in-law.On the way, they had to cross a river by a canoe ferry and, seduced by the deep blue waters of the river, Shakuntala ran her fingers through the water. Her ring (Dushyanta's ring) slipped off her finger without her realizing it. Upon reaching the king's palace, Dushyanta failed to recognise Shakuntala, and merely expressed his incredulity when the accompanying sages urged him to accept her as his queen. Shakuntala searched for the ring that the king had presented her during their parting, but realised that it had been lost during the journey. While leaving the hall, the anguished Shakuntala is carried off by an apsara. After a while, the ring that Shakuntala had dropped in a pool of water was discovered by a fisherman inside a fish, which was produced before Dushyanta following accusations of theft. Durvasa's curse was broken upon the king seeing the ring, and his memory of his wife was restored. He immediately set out to find her and, arriving at her father's ashram, discovered that she was no longer there. He continued deeper into the forest to find his wife and came upon a surprising scene in the forest: a young boy had pried open the mouth of a lion and was busy counting its teeth. The king greeted the boy, amazed by his boldness and strength, and asked his name. He was surprised when the boy answered that he was Bharata, the son of King Dushyanta. The boy took him to Shakuntala, and thus the family was reunited.

== Cast ==
- Samantha Ruth Prabhu as Shakuntala
- Dev Mohan as Dushyanta
- Sachin Khedekar as Kanva Maharshi
- Mohan Babu as Durvasa Maharshi
- Aditi Balan as Priyamvada
- Ananya Nagalla as Anasuya
- Prakash Raj as Sarangi
- Gautami as Gautami
- Madhoo as Menaka
- Kabir Bedi as Kashyapa Maharshi
- Jisshu Sengupta as Indra Deva
- Kabir Duhan Singh as Asura King Ugranemi
- Allu Arha as Prince Bharata
- Varshini Sounderajan as Sanumathi
- Harish Uthaman as Asura Vikrodhanemi
- Subbaraju as Asura Athikrodhanemi

== Production ==
=== Development ===
In 2017, director Gunasekhar announced a magnum opus Hiranya Kashyapa with Rana Daggubati as the lead. The film was based on the famous mythological epic tale of the Asura, Hiranyakashipu. In October 2020, the director announced that the pre-production of Hiranya Kashyapa was completed during the COVID-19 pandemic, the shooting process of the film will not start in the near future. Later in November, Gunasekher announced the film based on Kalidasa's 4th century play Shakuntala which tells the story of the legendary princess Shakuntala and king Dushyanta.

=== Casting ===
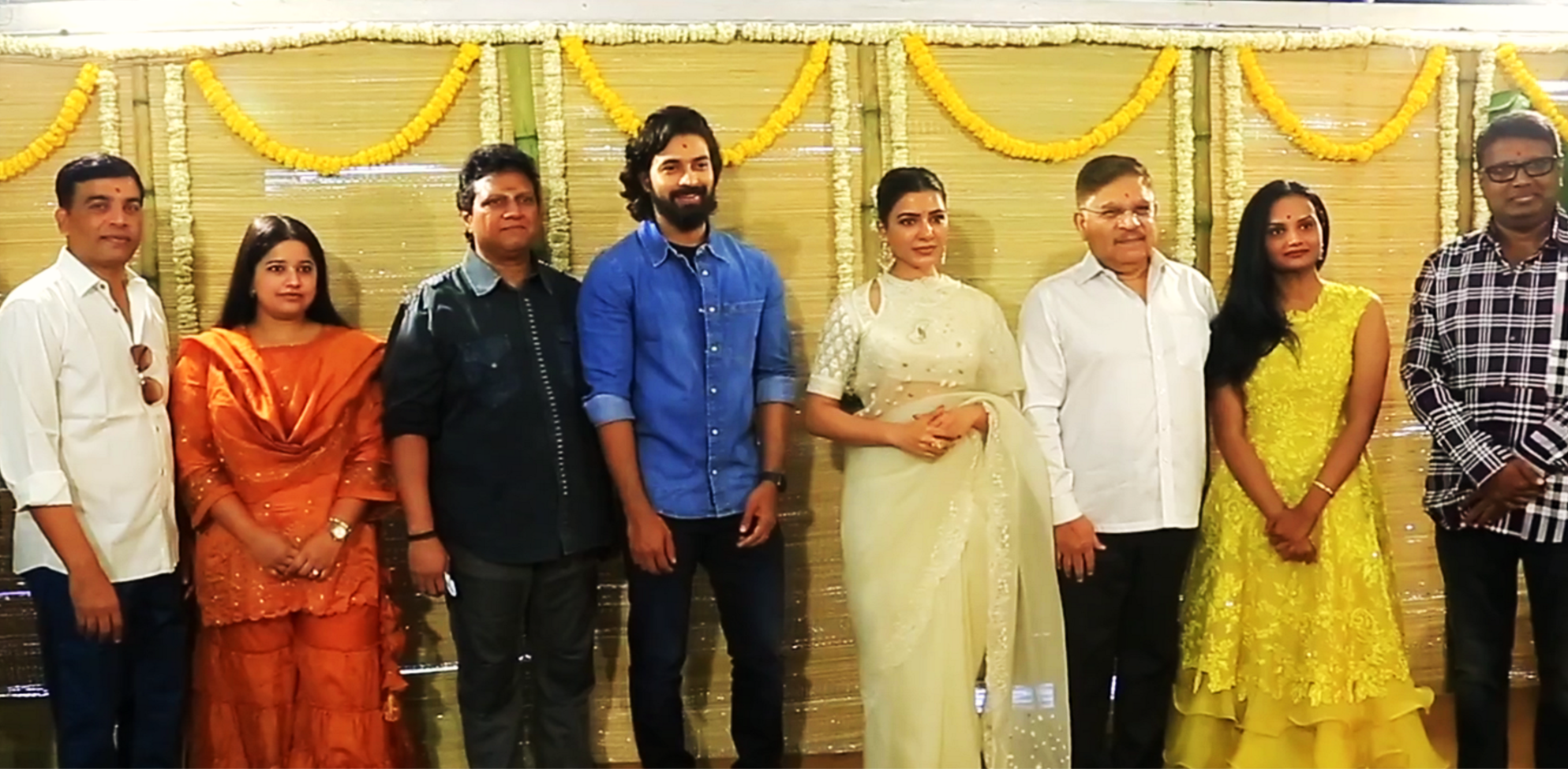
The cast and crew of Shaakuntalam at the film's launch during March 2021 at Annapurna Studios. The cast and crew being Dil Raju, Hanshitha Reddy, Mani Sharma, Dev Mohan, Samantha Ruth Prabhu, Allu Aravind, Neelima Guna and Gunasekhar (l-r)

Soon after the announcement, reports suggested that the makers have approached Anushka Shetty for the portrayal of Shakuntala, after her collaboration with Gunasekhar in the historical drama, Rudhramadevi (2015), which did not materialize.

Later in the year, Malayalam film actor Dev Mohan and Telugu film actress Eesha Rebba were approached for the film, with Mohan reportedly playing Dushyanta and Eesha Rebba supposed character unknown. In March 2021, media mentioned that Rebba has walked out of the project due to several reason. In March 2021, Samantha has taken her social media to announce that Dev Mohan is officially a part of the project as Dushyant. Veteran actor Mohan Babu was also cast in the film. He was reportedly playing the hot-tempered Durvasa Maharishi and Aditi Balan was replacing Rebba in the film. It was reported that both Gautami and Prakash Raj was also featuring in Shaakuntalam.

Reports came around that the director will be approaching Jr NTR's son Abhay Ram or Allu Arjun's son Allu Ayaan to feature in as Shakuntala's son Bharata, but Allu Arjun's daughter Allu Arha is having her maiden debut in this production as said character. Actress Ananya Nagalla and Varshini Sounderajan confirmed of being a part in the film through respective interviews while actress Madhoo also joined the cast.Kabir Duhan Singh also joined the cast to play the role of King Asura.

=== Filming ===
The film is set in North, in the backdrops of Hastinapur, parts of Kashmir, and the banks of the Himalayas. The makers signed on art director Ashok Kolarath to handle the set design. They also hired National Awardee fashion designer, Neeta Lulla, who also designed the costumes in Rudhramadevi. The pooja and the principal photography of Shaakuntalam was kickstarted on 15 March 2021 at Annapurna Studios. It was revealed that Sekhar V. Joseph and Bishwadeep Chatterjee were also signed on for the cinematography and sound design of the film, respectively.

The first schedule of filming was started in late March with Samantha Ruth Prabhu, Dev Mohan, and Aditi Balan at Annapurna Studios in Hyderabad. But due to the second wave of COVID-19 pandemic in India, the shooting was halted towards the end of June. During an interview, Gunasekhar has stated that almost 50% of filming has been completed on late June. The shooting will be recommenced during the end of June back at Annapurna Studios, then later in Ramoji Film City. Reportedly, Samantha Ruth Prabhu joined the second schedule of filming along with Dev Mohan and Aditi Balan. Several scenes were shot in Ananthagiri Hills and Vikarabad Forests with actor Dev Mohan. Several scenes were shot in Gandipet Lake in July 2021. The filming was finished on the last week of August 2021 at Annapurna Studios.

=== Post-production ===
The visual and graphics department is handled by industry professional Alagarsamy Maayan, with talents from Canada, Hong Kong and China working on the VFX to get the visualisation right. Director Gunasekhar has confirmed that the post production might be longer than 10 months, considering the vision of the director to be met. Samantha completed her dubbing portions in April 2022. She is dubbing for herself in Telugu, Tamil and Hindi. The makers reported in January 2022 that Allu Arha had completed the dubbing for her role for the film. In November 2022 the makers of the film decided to convert the film into 3D.By the end of January 2023 the film was converted into 3D.

== Music ==
Shaakuntalam

Soundtrack album by Mani Sharma
- Released: 2023
- Studio: Annapurna Studios
- Genre: Feature film soundtrack
- Length: 21:36
- Language: Telugu
- Label: Tips

The film's music for all versions is composed by Mani Sharma.

Telugu
No.	Title	Lyrics	Singer(s)	Length
1.	"Mallika Mallika"	Chaitanya Prasad	Ramya Behara	5:20
2.	"Rushivanamlona"	Sri Mani	Chinmayi Sripaada, Sid Sriram	4:47
3.	"Yelelo Yelelo"	Chaitanya Prasad	Anurag Kulkarni	6:00
4.	"Madhura Gathamaa"	Shreemani	Armaan Malik, Shreya Ghoshal	5:29
Total length:				21:36

== Release ==
Shaakuntalam was scheduled to be released theatrically on 4 November 2022 along with the dubbed versions of Tamil, Hindi, Malayalam and Kannada, but was later postponed due to the film being chosen to be converted into 3D format. The makers announced that the film will not hit the screens on 17 February and they will share the new release date soon. On 10 February 2023, it was announced that the film will be released on 14 April 2023. The film premiered on Amazon Prime Video on 11 May 2023.

== Reception ==
=== Critical response ===
Shaakuntalam received negative reviews from critics. On the review aggregator website Rotten Tomatoes, 20% of 5 critics' reviews are positive, with an average rating of 5.5/10.

Khushboo Ratda of Pinkvilla rated the film 2.5 out of 5 stars and wrote "Samantha's image needed far smarter writing". Dishya Sharma of News 18 rated the film 2 out of 5 stars and stated that the film suffers with "Weak writing and undercooked VFX". The Hans India rated the film 2 out of 5 and wrote "Gunasekhar fails to bring enough drama to the proceedings to hold the attention". Sakshi Post gave the film a rating of 2 out of 5 and termed the film as "wasted opportunity". Raghu Bandi of The Indian Express rated the film 2 out of 5 stars and wrote " The only letdown is this particular subject is hardly the right material for the current generation". Sowmya Rajendran of The News Minute rated 1.5 out of 5 and wrote "Samantha tries her best to move the audience, but there's only so much an actor can do when attempting to stay afloat in a tsunami of bad writing." Sanchita Jhunjhunwala of Zoom TV rated the film 1.5 out of 5 and wrote "Gunasekhar establishes very early on in the movie as to how he intends on taking it forward, but the fact that the movie does not have any plot point that keeps you hooked is one of the many things that works against it." Sanchita Jhunjhunwala of Times Now rated the film 1.5 out of 5 stars and wrote "This Gunasekhar directorial fails to create an impact with its poor storytelling and VFX that fails to work". Deepa Gahlot of Rediff.com have the film a rating of 1.5 out of 5 and termed love story of Shakuntala and Dushyant as "So familiar from textbooks, comics, stage and screen versions".
