= Sekhar V. Joseph =

Indian cinematographer

Sekhar V. Joseph is a cinematographer in the Tamil and Telugu film industries. He is known for his collaborations with Gunasekhar and P. Vasu.

== Filmography ==
Movie	Year	Language	Notes
1991	Arangu	Malayalam	
1991	Parallel College	Malayalam	
1991	Georgekutty C/O Georgekutty	Malayalam	
1991	MGR Nagaril	Tamil	
1995	Sogasu Chooda Tharamaa	Telugu	
1997	Ramayanam	Telugu	
1997	Avathara Purushan	Tamil	
1999	Maravathe Kanmaniye	Tamil	
2000	Manoharam	Telugu	
2001	Mrugaraju	Telugu	
2002	Nuvvu Leka Nenu Lenu	Telugu	
2003	Okkadu	Telugu	
2003	Toli Choopulone	Telugu	
2004	Arjun	Telugu	
2005	Chandramukhi	Tamil	
2005	Sivakasi	Tamil	
2006	Paramasivan	Tamil	
2007	Maharathi	Telugu	
2007	Lakshyam	Telugu	
2008	Vaana	Telugu	
2009	Maska	Telugu	
2010	Rama Rama Krishna Krishna	Telugu	
2012	Ishtam	Tamil	
2016	Right Right	Telugu	
2017	Kaadhali	Telugu	
2023	Shaakuntalam	Telugu	

== Awards ==
- Nandi Award for Best Cinematographer - Okkadu (2003)
