= Konji Pesalaam =

- Poster
- Directed by: R. Kaleeswaran
- Written by: R. Kaleeswaran
- Produced by: Stanley Rajan
- Starring: Rajkiran; Sreeja; Vamsi; C. Mukesh Kumar; Avinash
- Cinematography: Ashok Rajan
- Edited by: R. K. Pazhanivel
- Music by: Ilaiyaraaja
- Production company: Stanwin Creations
- Release date: 12 December 2003
- Running time: 135 minutes
- Country: India
- Language: Tamil

Konji Pesalaam (transl. Let's kiss and talk) is a 2003 Indian Tamil-language romantic drama film written and directed by R. Kaleeswaran. The film stars newcomers Sreeja, Vamsi, C. Mukesh Kumar and Avinash, with Rajkiran, Vijayakumar, Poovilangu Mohan, Raman Nair, Meera Krishnan and K. A. Gunasekaran playing supporting roles.

The film was released on 12 December 2003.

== Plot ==
The film begins with the church father Amalan lecturing the young man David (Vamsi) on what we should do to become a priest. David enters the seminary to become a church priest but he falls under the spell of the church singer Nivedita. Amalan then warns David to not lose focus on the spiritual life and tells him to choose church over the love if he wanted to become a priest. One day, Amalan gives Nivedita a love letter. When Amalan learns of it, David was forced to carry a cross like Jesus did as a punishment. Later, Nivedita tells him that he did a mistake and tells him her bitter past.

In the past, Nivedita was a carefree girl living with her father Muthupandi in a village. Muthupandi was a kind-hearted village chief who helped the poor and he was against caste discrimination, thus he had a lot of enemies. Nivedita and the Brahmin boy Bharathi were in love with each other whereas her uncle Kannan was deeply in love with Nivedita. Kannan then sacrificed his love for his niece and decided to secretly arrange their marriage. The day of the wedding, Muthupandi heavily wounded Kannan with his machete and threatened to kill him if they didn't stop the marriage, he then forced Kannan to marry Nivedita. After the marriage, Kannan was confined to bed, unable to walk, dependent on the help of Nivedita and felt bad for her. Kannan wanted to talk to Bharathi who was about to leave the village, Nivedita, therefore, decided to search for Bharathi. At the railway station, Nivedita saw him in a train. She then got on the moving train and she convinced Bharathi to talk with her husband. When they arrived at the home, Kannan succumbed to the injuries. The whole village started to talk ill about Nivedita and Bharathi's relationship, Muthupandi felt so embarrassed at that moment, so they have no choice but to leave the place. At the railway station, frustrated and in tears, Bharathi wanted to die but Nivedita reasoned him and got on a train leaving him alone. She travelled to Chennai in order to find a job and became a church singer.

Back to the present, Nivedita goes back to the village with David. At her return, the villagers insult Nivedita for bringing shame and dishonour upon her father. Nivedita apologises to her father Muthupandi, who is now taking care of Bharathi. When Nivetha left him, Bharathi felt sad and depressed, so he attempted to terminate his life. He jumped onto a moving train and became paralysed from the waist down. Muthupandi then apologises to his daughter for not understanding her. The film ends with David leaving the village for the church and Nivedita returning home with her father and her future husband Bharathi.

== Cast ==
- Rajkiran as Muthupandi
- Sreeja as Nivedita
- Vamsi as David
- C. Mukesh Kumar as Bharathi
- Avinash as Kannan
- Vijayakumar as Amalan
- Poovilangu Mohan
- Raman Nair
- Meera Krishnan as Chinna Thayi
- K. A. Gunasekaran as Sivankalai
- Jinda as Kovalai
- Ushar Jai as Thavalai
- Muthuraj
- Priyanka as Maami
- Theni Kunjarammal
- Stanley Rajan
- Vasanthi Stanley
- R. Rajendran
- Dhadha Muthukumar

== Production ==
After his growing popularity in character roles, Rajkiran signed to play the father role in Konji Pesalaam. R. Kaleeswaran, Professor in Public Culture Communication from Loyola College and also directed documentaries, wrote the story of the film and made his directorial debut. The film was shot Nagercoil and its surroundings, apart from Chennai, and the songs in Courtallam and Kerala.

== Soundtrack ==
The soundtrack was composed by Ilaiyaraaja. The song "Ithuvarai Naan" is set in the raga Chandrakauns.

Song	Singer(s)	Lyrics	Duration
"Aathara Sruthi"	Karthik, Sadhana Sargam	Mu. Metha	4:47
"Ezhu Vannam"	Karthik, Sadhana Sargam	Mu. Metha	4:43
"Ithuvarai Naanoru"	Tippu	Vaali	5:07
"Kasturi Pottu"	Tippu	Vaali	4:51
"Siru Siru Siragugalil"	P. Unnikrishnan	Muthulingam	5:29
"Siru Siru Siragugalil"	Vijay Yesudas	Muthulingam	5:28
"Unnai Thedi Thedi"	Sadhana Sargam	Palani Bharathi	5:05
"Konji Pesalaam"	Bhavatharini	Kamakodiyan	3:14
