= Nandhini (film) =

- Title card
- Directed by: Manobala
- Written by: M. S. Madhu (dialogue)
- Story by: Ananthu
- Produced by: V. Natarajan
- Starring: Prakash Raj; Suhasini; Keerthi Reddy; Vineeth
- Cinematography: M. Prasad
- Edited by: Siva-Krishnamoorthy
- Music by: Sirpy
- Release date: 11 July 1997
- Country: India
- Language: Tamil

Nandhini (stylised as Na•n•dhi•ni) is a 1997 Indian Tamil-language drama film directed by Manobala. The film stars Prakash Raj, Suhasini, Keerthi Reddy and Vineeth, with S. P. Balasubrahmanyam, Manivannan and Vadivukkarasi in supporting roles. It was released on 11 July 1997.

== Plot ==
Raji, a college going girl, is in love with Suresh but strange stories of her mother Nandhini being linked with Rangaswamy, their paying guest, deeply affect her. Raji questions Rangaswamy but he is deeply anguished by her behaviour and suffers a heart attack that ultimately ends the Good Samaritan's life. Raji is emotionally disturbed and refuses any association with Suresh, and seeks solace with Nandhini. However Nandhini's strange behaviour devastates her and she wishes to resume her relationship with Suresh. Finally, Suresh learns about Prakash and Nandhini's love and reunites with Raji in the end, and escorts her from Chennai to Mumbai. Kannadi Vijay then promises to care for Nandhini.

== Cast ==
- Prakash Raj as Prakash
- Suhasini as Nandhini
- Keerthi Reddy as Raji
- Vineeth as Suresh
- S. P. Balasubrahmanyam as Rangaswamy
- Manivannan as Karupatti Kandhasamy
- Vadivukkarasi as Prakash's mother
- Thalaivasal Vijay as Kannadi Vijay
- Madhan Bob as Rangabashyam
- Thadi Balaji as driver
- Manobala as Kumbakonam
- S. N. Lakshmi
- Pandu as peon
- Vichu Vishwanath as office staff
- Chitti as Suresh's father
- Uma Padmanabhan as Nandhini's friend (cameo appearance)

== Production ==
The film's title Nandhini is stylised with intermittent dots. Manobala said they represent different people in the title character's life. Suhasini agreed to play Nandhini after much persuasion.

== Soundtrack ==
The soundtrack was composed by Sirpy.

Song	Singers	Length
"ABCD Pola Naam"	Mano, Swarnalatha	5:39
"Hey Ennai Paar"	Mano	4:14
"Laila Laila"	S. P. Balasubrahmanyam, K.S. Chithra	5:03
"Maanoothu Odaiyila"	Manivannan	3:46
"Patta Sarakku"	S. P. Balasubrahmanyam	4:49

== Critical reception ==
K. N. Vijiyan of New Straits Times wrote, "It is a pity that despite a good cast, the director fails to sustain interest. This is one of those movies which you expect to enjoy but instead you are terribly let down".
