= Arjun (2004 film) =

2004 film by Gunasekhar

- Directed by: Gunasekhar
- Written by: Story & Screenplay: Gunasekhar; Dialogues: Paruchuri Brothers
- Produced by: G. Ramesh Babu
- Starring: Mahesh Babu; Shriya Saran; Keerthi Reddy
- Cinematography: Sekhar V. Joseph
- Edited by: A. Sreekar Prasad
- Music by: Mani Sharma
- Release date: 18 August 2004
- Running time: 174 minutes
- Country: India
- Language: Telugu
- Budget: ₹20 crore

Arjun is a 2004 Indian Telugu-language action drama film co-written and directed by Gunasekhar and produced by G. Ramesh Babu. The film starred Mahesh Babu as the titular character along with Shriya Saran, Keerthi Reddy, Raja, Prakash Raj, and Saritha. The music was composed by Mani Sharma. The film follows twin siblings Arjun and Meenakshi. When Meenakshi shares her plan to elope with her lover, Uday, Arjun successfully convinces Uday's parents to consent to the marriage. However, after the parents agree, they repeatedly attempt to murder Meenakshi to claim a family property, forcing Arjun to step in and save his sister's life.

The film featured a massive replica of the Madurai Meenakshi Temple, designed by Thota Tharani. This set was one of the largest ever built in Indian cinema and took six months to build at Padmalaya Studios. The film released on 18 August 2004 and was moderately successful at the box office, however was unable to recoup its expensive budget of ₹20 crore and stood as an average success overall. The film won three Nandi Awards. Arjun was Keerthi Reddy's final acting performance prior to her retirement from the film industry.

== Plot ==
Arjun and his twin sister Meenakshi finish college, and their parents decide to look for a good man to marry Meenakshi. Meenakshi shows Arjun a letter from their friend Uday, who confesses his love for her and asks her to elope with him, as his parents Bala Nayagar and Andal are arranging his marriage to another girl. Meenakshi tells Arjun that she too is interested in Uday. Arjun goes to Madurai, where Uday lives with his parents and is about to get married. Arjun tells Uday's parents about the letter and asks for their consent for marriage. Uday dares to marry Meenakshi before their parents' approval comes. Uday's parents agree to Meenakshi as their daughter-in-law, though they have different plans in mind.

Meanwhile, Arjun meets Roopa, who also happens to be from Madurai, and they fall for each other. In Meenakshi's house, Uday's parents plan to kill her as they had lost a chance to grab a millionaire's property through an arranged marriage. They make multiple attempts to kill Meenakshi, but she survives. Arjun concludes that they are trying to kill his sister, but Uday and Meenakshi do not believe him. At last, Meenakshi believes him when they try to kill her while Uday is away. She escapes with the help of Arjun and Roopa and gives birth to twins. In that fight, Bala dies, and Andal develops paralysis. Uday watches how they tried to kill Meenakshi and believes Arjun's version. They all reconcile and live peacefully.

== Cast ==
- Mahesh Babu as Arjun
- Keerthi Reddy as Meenakshi "Meena", Arjun's twin sister (voice dubbed by Rohini)
- Shriya Saran as Roopa (voice dubbed by Savitha Reddy)
- Raja as Uday, Meenakshi's husband
- Prakash Raj as Bala Naicker, Uday's father
- Saritha as Andal, Uday's mother
- Tanikella Bharani as Roopa's father
- Murali Mohan as Anand Rao, Arjun and Meenakshi's father
- Kamala Krishnaswamy as Arjun and Meenakshi's mother
- M. S. Narayana as invigilator
- Kalabhavan Mani as Doranna
- Rajan P. Dev as Govindarajulu
- Master Ram Teja (Maanas Nagulapalli)
- Vennira Aadai Nirmala as Parvathiamma, Arjun and Meenakshi's paternal aunt (Cameo)
- Nassar as Police Commissioner Ratnavelu (Cameo)

== Production ==
The film was produced by Mahesh's brother Ramesh. This was Mahesh's last film released before he married Namrata Shirodkar. On the other hand, this was the first movie (and the last as of July 2008) of Keerthi Reddy after her marriage. The film was launched at Padmalaya Studios in Hyderabad on 18 July 2003, to which the whole unit of the film attended. The technical team, except for art and lyrics, were retained from Mahesh-Gunasekhar's previous film, Okkadu. The filming had a single schedule which started from 18 July itself. Mahesh played a role similar to the one he played in Okkadu, while Shriya Saran was hired as the heroine opposite him. Keerthi Reddy played the role of Mahesh's sister and paired with Raja in the film. Prakash Raj played the role of Bala Nayakar, the last heir of the Nayakar dynasty who were well known in the history of Madurai while Saritha made a comeback to Telugu cinema after 16 years in the role of Andal, the wife of Nayakar.

The main attraction of the film was the colossal set of Madurai Meenakshi Temple created by art director Thota Tharani. Its details were revealed on 29 September 2003 by the production unit via a press meet. Thota Tharani, along with the director and his team, stayed in Madurai Meenakshi Temple for 15 days. He drew his sketches to the minute details and replicated them in Hyderabad. The initial estimate of the Temple set cost was ₹ 2.5 crores which were supposed to be built in three months. But, it took six months with over 500 workers constructing the set. The total cost of this set turned out to be ₹ 4 crores. This set was constructed in a 5-acre space of Padmalaya Studios near Gandipet. This set consist of Gaali Gopuram, Pond and Garbhagudi. The set had a lifetime of 3 years with resistance to all types of climatic conditions. Thota Tharani used 90 tons of iron in the construction of this temple set for longevity. 90 tons of iron itself cost around 42 lakhs. The pond in the temple has a depth of 3 feet. It took five days of continuous filling using five motors to fill the water. The Gaali Gopuram is of 130 feet, which is equivalent to the original Gaali Gopuram at Madurai temple. A set of temple priests from Madurai came to this set and installed a replica idol of Meenakshi Amman in the Garbhagudi. This traditional installation took 8 hours (from 6 am to 2 pm). Gunasekhar used 25 powerful generation sets for a song to be shot in the temple in night effect.

Another set for the exterior of Prakash Raj character's house and the streets of Madurai were also created at Padmalaya studios of Gandipet. The shooting happened at Padmalaya Studios in these sets for 60 Days which was equivalent to 40% of the film's shoot. The song "Madhura Madhuratara" was shot in day effect while "Dum Dumaare" was shot in night effect at Madurai Temple set.

One song sequence with Mahesh and Shriya was shot in St. Petersburg in Russia, and another was shot in the Issyk-Kul lake region, Tian Shan mountains, and Ala Archa National Park of Kyrgyzstan.

== Soundtrack ==
Arjun

Soundtrack album by Mani Sharma
- Released: 22 July 2004
- Recorded: 2004
- Genre: Feature film soundtrack
- Language: Telugu
- Label: Aditya Music
- Producer: Mani Sharma

Mani Sharma chronology
| Yagnam (2004) | Arjun (2004) | Gudumba Shankar (2004) |

This film consists of six songs. The audio was launched at a floor of Padmalaya Studios on 22 July 2004.

All lyrics are written by Veturi; all music is composed by Mani Sharma.

| No. | Title | Singer(s) | Length |
|---|---|---|---|
| 1. | "Okka Maata" | Shankar Mahadevan | 05:41 |
| 2. | "Oh Cheli Nee Oyyarale" | K. S. Chithra, Karthik | 05:13 |
| 3. | "Madhura Madhuratara" | P. Unnikrishnan, Harini | 05:34 |
| 4. | "Ra Ra Rajakumara" | Udit Narayan, Swarnalatha | 05:34 |
| 5. | "Aey Pilla" | Shreya Ghoshal, S. P. Charan | 04:50 |
| 6. | "Dum Dumare" | S. P. Balasubrahmanyam, K. S. Chithra | 06:14 |

== Reception ==
Jeevi of Idlebrain.com wrote "The movie starts with a terrific frame of Mahesh narrating his story. First half of the film is fair. There is no bang/twist for the interval. The graph goes down in second half. Action sequences dominated the sentiment feel in the climax of the film, which made the climax unimpressive". Telugu Cinema wrote "Technical wizardry, Mahesh's performance, Mani Sarma's music, Thota-Tarani's art, and Sekhar's camera are the highlights of the film. The film is a rehash of Puttintiki Ra Chelli! starring Arjun, Meena & Swathi, and is filled with predictable stuff".

== Awards ==
Filmfare Awards South

- Filmfare Award for Best Supporting Actress – Telugu - Keerthi Reddy

Nandi Awards

- Best Art Director – Thota Tharani
- Special Jury Awards – Mahesh Babu, Saritha
