= Sogasu Chooda Tarama! =

- Poster
- Directed by: Gunasekhar
- Written by: Story & Screenplay: Gunasekhar; Dialogues: Ajayshanthi
- Produced by: K. Ram Gopal
- Starring: Naresh; Indraja; Tanikella Bharani; Mallikarjuna Rao; Ramana Murthy
- Cinematography: Sekhar V. Joseph
- Edited by: Shankar
- Music by: Bharadwaj
- Release date: 14 July 1995
- Running time: 144 minutes
- Country: India
- Language: Telugu

Sogasu Chooda Tarama! (trans."Is it possible to fully look at such divine beauty and elegance?") is a 1995 Telugu language romance film directed by Gunasekhar. The film stars Naresh, Indraja, Tanikella Bharani, Mallikarjuna Rao, and Ramana Murthy. It won four Nandi Awards. It was not commercially successful. The film is an uncredited remake of 1993 American film Indecent Proposal.

== Cast ==
- Naresh as Venkat Rao
- Indraja as Neelima
- Tanikella Bharani
- Mallikarjuna Rao
- Dharmavarapu Subrahmanyam
- Ramana Murthy
- Devadas Kanakala
- Easwar
- Annapoorna

== Soundtrack ==
Sogasu Chuda Taramaa?

Soundtrack album by Bharadwaj
- Released: 1995
- Recorded: 1995
- Genre: Soundtrack
- Length: 27:39
- Label: Magnasound Records
- Producer: Bharadwaj

Bharadwaj chronology
Sogasu Chuda Taramaa? (1995)	Merupu (1996)

Track-List
No.	Title	Lyrics	Singer(s)	Length
1.	"Orayyo Yendammo"	Bhuvana Chandra	S. P. Balasubrahmanyam, Anuradha Sriram	4:38
2.	"Akashamlo Neeli Mabbula"	Sirivennela Seetharama Sastry	S. P. Balasubrahmanyam, Sujatha Mohan, Rohini	4:37
3.	"Seethakoka Chilukalamma"	Sirivennela Seetharama Sastry	Anuradha Sriram	5:09
4.	"Sogasu Chooda Tarama"	Sirivennela Seetharama Sastry	K. J. Yesudas	3:33
5.	"Pannu Katti Pettu Pellama"	Sirivennela Seetharama Sastry	S. P. Balasubrahmanyam, Anuradha Sriram	4:43
6.	"Ori Babai Chooda Chakkani"	Sirivennela Seetharama Sastry	Suresh Peters, Khushi Murali	4:59
Total length:				27:39

== Awards ==
Nandi Awards

- Best Feature Film - Gold - K. Ram Gopal
- Best Dialogue Writer - Ajay Shanti
- Best Costume Designer - Koteswara Rao
- Best Screenplay Writer - Gunasekhar
