= Laati =

- Title card
- Directed by: Gunasekhar
- Produced by: M. V. Muralikrishna
- Starring: Prashanth; Samyuktha Singh; Raghuvaran
- Cinematography: K. C. Diwakar
- Edited by: Shankar
- Music by: M. M. Keeravani
- Production company: Murali Krishna Movies
- Release date: 5 November 1992
- Running time: 135 minutes
- Country: India
- Language: Telugu

Laati (transl. Lathi) is a 1992 Indian Telugu-language action romance film directed by Gunasekhar in his debut, starring Prashanth, Samyuktha Singh, and Raghuvaran. The film won three Nandi Awards. The film was released on 5 November 1992. It was later dubbed in Tamil as Dawood Ibrahim.

== Plot ==
Srinivas is a young boy (Prashanth) who dreams of becoming a police officer. He eventually joins a police training college and gets posted as a police constable in an area, where don Avinash (Raghuvaran) rules over the area. Srinivas wins over Avinash, encountering ordeals. He falls in love with Sangeetha (played by debutant Samyuktha).Avinash traps Srinivas in a fake case that removes Srinivas from police post. At the end Srinivas strikes back ending Avinash reign as underworld don.

== Cast ==
- Prashanth as Srinivas
- Samyuktha Singh as Sangeetha
- Raghuvaran as Avinash
- Kitty as Circle Inspector Varma
- JD Chakravarthy as Ramana
- Chinna as Babji
- Brahmaji as Brahmaji
- Surya as Gopi
- Vinod Bala as Bhaskar
- Narra Venkateswara Rao as Head Constable
- Sai Kumar as Prithvi
- Ravi Teja as Avinash's henchman
- Narsing Yadav as Avinash's goon

== Soundtrack ==
The soundtrack was composed by M. M. Keeravani.

| Song | Singer(s) |
|---|---|
| "Goppa Kathe" | Keeravani |
| "Ikkadunnava" | K. S. Chitra |
| "Madhura Paragam" | Keeravani |
| "Music Bit" | |
| "Parugulu Pette" | Keeravani |
| "Parugulu Pette" | Chithra |
| "Ulikipadda Gundelona" | S. P. Balasubrahmanyam, Chitra |

== Awards ==
Nandi Awards

- Best Editor – Shankar
- Best First Film Director – Gunasekhar
- Best Cinematographer – K. C. Divakar
