= Vizhi Moodi Yosithaal =

2014 Indian film by K. G. Senthil Kumar

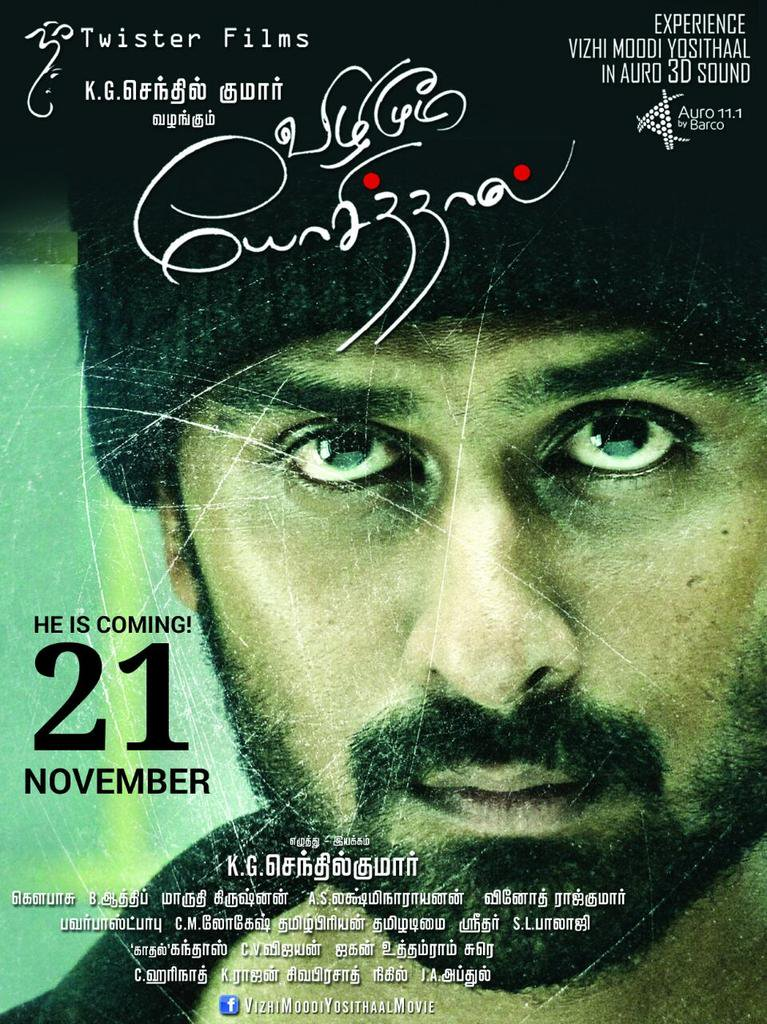
- Theatrical Release Poster
- Directed by: K. G. Senthil Kumar
- Written by: K. G. Senthil Kumar
- Produced by: K. G. Senthil Kumar
- Starring: K. G. Senthil Kumar; Nikita
- Cinematography: Gowbasu
- Edited by: K. Maruthi
- Music by: B. Aathif
- Production company: Twister Films
- Distributed by: Twister Films
- Release date: 21 November 2014
- Running time: 122 minutes
- Country: India
- Language: Tamil

Vizhi Moodi Yosithaal (lit. 'When you close your eyes and think') is a 2014 Tamil-language science fiction thriller film written, produced, and directed by debutante K. G. Senthil Kumar, starring himself and Nikita. The film is based around the concept of extrasensory perception. The music was composed by B. Aashif with cinematography by Gowbasu and editing by K. Maruthi. The film released on 21 November 2014 to mixed reviews from audience and critics.

The title of the film was inspired by a song from the movie Ayan (2009).

== Plot ==
KG (K. G. Senthil Kumar), has a gift of seeing five minutes into his future, but he would not be able to see his future if he is either intoxicated with alcohol or sleeping. KG does not realize that he has a gift until Niki (Nikita), the girl he loved dearly, is killed by a group of four terrorists right in front of his eyes while he had consumed alcohol. Once he realizes that if he would not have had alcohol and that he could have saved Niki's life, KG sets on a mission to find the culprits who killed Niki. While he finds the whereabouts of each terrorist and kills them one by one, he unravels the master plan of a big terrorist network to attack all the power stations of the entire state of Tamil Nadu, thereby causing panic and economic depression in the state. KG also finds out that the terrorists plan to do the same in all the states in India after hitting Tamil Nadu in order to collapse the entire Indian economy. Using his power to see five minutes into the future and with the help of his friends, KG successfully kills the mastermind behind this attack and saves Tamil Nadu from a great disaster. Realizing that he has a gift that not any normal person would have, KG dedicates himself to the society and roams around his city as a watchdog to save people from any possible terrorist attacks in the future.

== Cast ==
- K. G. Senthil Kumar as KG
- Nikita as Niki
- Urvashi as KG's mother
- Bala Singh as Bai
- Srinivasan as College Alumni (guest appearance)
- Amit Bhargav
- Bhanu Sri Mehra as Megha
- Misha Ghoshal as Hasini
- Bujjy as Chetan
- Rudra as Raghav
- Arul as Inas
- Mahesh Subramaniam
- Bhargav
- Susiq as Vani
- Aroul D. Jothi as Ganesan
- Durai Ramesh as Niki's father
- Harish Nair as Senior
- Mutta Podimas Anoop as Mutta Podimas
- Lingesh as CBCID Assistant
- Jayaraj
- Sathish
- Yogesh
- Yuvaraj as Bhai's assistant
- Kovardhan as Courier
- Selvam as Exam Hall Senior
- Subash as Love Letter Guy

== Soundtrack ==
Vizhi Moodi Yosithaal

Soundtrack album by B. Aathif
- Released: 2 November 2014
- Recorded: 2014
- Genre: Feature film soundtrack
- Length: 27:32
- Language: Tamil
- Producer: B. Aathif

The film's soundtrack was composed by B. Aathif. The album features six tracks and was released on 2 November 2014.

Track listing
No.	Title	Lyrics	Singer(s)	Length
1.	"Jill Endra Megam"	C.M.Lokesh	Karthik	5:12
2.	"July Kaatru"	C.M.Lokesh	Deepak, Chinmayi	6:22
3.	"Saala Saloothey"	C.M.Lokesh	Deepak, Vikram, Shakthisree Gopalan	4:55
4.	"Yedhedho Ninaivin Orathil"	Tamizh Priyan, Tamizh Adimai	Shweta Mohan	4:47
5.	"Ellora Sirpam"	C.M.Lokesh	Rita	4:50
6.	"Kangal Rendum"	Tamizh Priyan, Tamizh Adimai	Deepak	2:46
Total length:				27.32

== Reception ==
M Suganth of The Times of India gave 1.5/5 stars and wrote, "Even at two hours, Vizhi Moodi Yosithaal feels long. Too much time is wasted on building the romance and the college moments are neither special nor necessary."
