= Athidhi =

2007 Indian film by Surender Reddy

- Theatrical release poster
- Directed by: Surender Reddy
- Written by: Story: Vakkantham Vamsi; Surender Reddy; Screenplay: Surender Reddy; Dialogues: Abburi Ravi
- Produced by: Ramesh Babu; Ronnie Screwvala
- Starring: Mahesh Babu; Amrita Rao
- Narrated by: Abburi Ravi
- Cinematography: Sameer Reddy
- Edited by: Gautham Raju
- Music by: Mani Sharma
- Production companies: UTV Motion Pictures; Krishna Productions Pvt.Ltd
- Distributed by: UTV Motion Pictures
- Release date: 18 October 2007
- Running time: 179 minutes
- Country: India
- Language: Telugu
- Budget: ₹20 crore

Athidhi (transl. The Guest) is a 2007 Indian Telugu-language romantic action thriller film directed by Surender Reddy and produced by G. Ramesh Babu under Krishna Pictures Private Limited. The film stars Mahesh Babu, alongside Amrita Rao (in her Telugu film debut and her only Telugu film to date), Murali Sharma and Ashish Vidyarthi.

Released on 18 October 2007, Athidhi ran for 35 days at 400 cinemas. It was later remade in Bangladesh as Durdhorsho Premik.

== Plot ==
In Delhi, Athidhi is released from prison and goes in search of his long-lost childhood friend Amrita. Athidhi comes across a girl named Amrita, who is chased by stalkers from her college. Amrita and Athidhi meet many times and she soon starts to like Athidhi, but has to leave for Hyderabad before she can confess her feelings. When Amritha tries to tell him that she is leaving, Athidhi realizes that the goons, whose illegal operations were thwarted by Athidhi, are after him. Athidhi continuously tells Amrita to leave and soon slaps her angry after she doesn't listen. Later, Athidhi goes to Amrita to apologize, but meets her friend Madhavi, who tells him that Amrita wanted to tell Athidhi that she is leaving for Hyderabad, where they head towards the cemetery to meet her.

Madhavi explains Amrita's origin to Athidhi, who realizes that Amrita is his friend. Athidhi arrives in Hyderabad and decides to head back Delhi Amrita's family, but he learns about a dreaded gangster Kaiser wants to kill Amrita. Later, Athidhi realizes that Kaiser was the psychopath who framed him for the death of Amrita's parents. It is revealed that Athidhi was a street orphan was adopted by Amrita's parents after he saved them from a dangerous path. While driving Athidhi to a hostel, they were stopped by a teenager, Kaiser, who shot and robbed the parents. Athidhi managed to grab the gun from Kaiser, but the cops misunderstand Athidhi behind the murders and arrested him, leaving Amrita feeling betrayed.

Meanwhile, Inspector Ajay Shastri is trying to track down Kaiser, but soon dies in an explosion in his house, which was planned by Kaiser. Athidhi soon figures out that Ajay is actually Kaiser. Before Kaiser's house blew up, Kaiser managed to escape and MLA Maccha Srinu realizes that Ajay and Kaiser are the same person and furious dies from a heart attack. Athidhi stops two attempts by Kaiser to kill Amrita, where he manages to kill Kaiser's men. Kaiser kidnaps Amrita and her younger sister, where he soon kills the sister.

Kaiser leads Amrita to a dungeon and calls Athidhi, where he tells him that he will kill Amrita if Athidhi does not rescue her in 12 hours. Athidhi kidnaps Kaiser's brother and agrees to release him in exchange for Amrita, but Kaiser kills his brother as he should not have any weakness. Kaiser reveals that he already killed Amrita, where Athidhi soon, when kills enraged all Kaiser's henchmen and thrashes Kaiser. However, Kaiser reveals that he lied about killing Amrita and that she is severely cut in the nerves and stuck in a certain air tank. Athidhi rescues Amrita and finishes Kaiser. Athidhi reunites with Amrita, who realizes that his innocence.

== Cast ==
- Mahesh Babu as Athidhi
- Amrita Rao as Amrita
  - Baby Annie as young Amrita
- Murali Sharma as Inspector Ajay Sastry / Qaiser
- Ashish Vidyarthi as Danny Bhai
- Kota Srinivasa Rao as Maccha Srinu, an MLA who works under Kaiser
- Ajay as Qaiser's brother
- Nassar as Amrita's Uncle, the Home Minister
- Brahmanandam as Shivram
- Sunil as Amrita's friend
- Ravi Prakash as Ravi, Athidhi's friend
- Pragathi as Amrita's sister in law
- Subbaraju as Ganni Bhai
- Maadhavi Latha as Madhavi, Amritha's friend
- Ashmitha Karnani as Amrita's mother
- Rajendran as Henchman
- Prabhakar as Goon
- Baby Karman Sandhu
- Hema
- Shankar Melkote
- Indrayudh Mandal (cameo)
- Venu Madhav (cameo)
- Rajiv Kanakala as Amrita's father (cameo)
- Malaika Arora Khan (Item number in the song "Rathraina")

== Soundtrack ==
The music was composed by Mani Sharma and released by Aditya Music.

Athidhi

Soundtrack album by Mani Sharma
- Released: 27 September 2007
- Recorded: 2007
- Genre: Soundtrack
- Length: 27:09
- Label: Aditya Music
- Producer: Mani Sharma

Mani Sharma chronology
Chiruta (2007)	Athidhi (2007)	Godava (2007)

Telugu Track list
No.	Title	Lyrics	Singer(s)	Length
1.	"Khabaddarani"	Sirivennela Seetharama Sastry	Naveen Madhav, Rahul Nambiar	4:27
2.	"Gona Gona"	Chandrabose	Rita, Naveen Madhav	4:28
3.	"Satyam Emito"	Sirivennela Seetharama Sastry	Deepu, Usha	4:49
4.	"Khiladi Koona"	Vishwa Deepak	Karthik, Rita	4:17
5.	"Rathraina"	Bhaskarabhatla Ravi Kumar	Anushka, Ranjith, Naveen Madhav, Suchitra	4:49
6.	"Valla Valla"	Sirivennela Seetharama Sastry	Rahul Nambiar, Darshana	4:20
Total length:				27:09

All lyrics are written by Vimal Kashyap.

Hindi Track list (International Khiladi: The Iron Man)
No.	Title	Length
1.	"Woh Deewangi"	4:27
2.	"Gona Gona"	4:28
3.	"Tujhe Sach Kahoon"	4:50
4.	"Kaatil Nigaahon Se"	4:17
5.	"Valla Valla"	4:20
Total length:		22:22

== Reception ==
Radhika Rajamani of Rediff.com wrote that the film "is built up through a 'racy' screenplay which is gripping to an extent, but stretches to three long hours". Jeevi of Idlebrain.com praised the film's first half while criticising the last thirty minutes of the film.

While the soundtrack by Mani Sharma and the performances by Babu, Rao and Sharma were praised, the film was criticised for its excessive violence and illogical scenes.

== Awards ==
- Nandi Award for Best Villain – Murali Sharma (2007)
