= Tera Jadoo Chal Gayaa =

- Poster
- Directed by: A. Muthu
- Written by: Ikram Akhtar; K. V. Shankar; Javed Siddiqui (dialogue)
- Produced by: Vashu Bhagnani
- Starring: Abhishek Bachchan; Keerthi Reddy
- Cinematography: Santosh Thundiyil
- Edited by: Sachin Adurkar; K. Ravi Kumar
- Music by: Songs: Ismail Darbar; Score: Ranjit Barot
- Production company: Pooja Entertainment
- Release date: 18 August 2000
- Running time: 152 minutes
- Country: India
- Language: Hindi

Tera Jadoo Chal Gayaa (transl. Your magical spell worked) is a 2000 Indian Hindi-language musical romance film directed by A. Muthu, starring Abhishek Bachchan and Keerthi Reddy. The film is inspired by Picture Perfect. It was released on 18 August 2000.

== Plot ==
On a visit to scenic Agra, Pooja meets a renowned artist, Kabir. Kabir is instantly attracted to Pooja, and thinks that she is also attracted to him. But Pooja is only attracted by his talent. On her return, she meets with her boss Mr. Oberoi and his son, Raj Oberoi, and she instantly falls in love with Raj. Mr. Oberoi is unhappy with Pooja coming in late to work frequently and wants to terminate her employment. A fellow employee, Maggi, comes to Pooja's rescue by telling Mr. Oberoi that Pooja is engaged to Kabir, and showing him some photographs that were taken during Pooja's visit to Agra. Pooja reluctantly goes along with this charade in order to keep her job. Kabir is encouraged knowing that Pooja has announced her engagement with him.

== Cast ==
- Abhishek Bachchan as Kabir Shrivastav
- Keerthi Reddy as Pooja Sinha
- Sanjay Suri as Raj Oberoi
- Kader Khan as Mr. Oberoi
- Paresh Rawal as Gaffoor Bhai
- Johnny Lever as Maggie
- Tiku Talsania as Ramesh Tolani
- Farida Jalal as Pooja's Mother
- Himani Shivpuri as Shyama Aapa, Gaffoor's wife
- Ghanashyam Nayak as baniya
- Satya Vrat Mudgal as photographer Satya

== Soundtrack ==
Tera Jadoo Chal Gayaa

Soundtrack album by Ismail Darbar
- Released: July 2000
- Genre: Feature film soundtrack
- Length: 52:19
- Label: Tips Music

Music was chartbuster, According to the Indian trade website Box Office India, with around 18,00,000 units sold, this film's soundtrack album was the year's tenth highest-selling.

All lyrics are written by Sameer; all music is composed by Ismail Darbar.

Songs
No.	Title	Playback	Length
1.	"Tera Jadoo Chal Gaya"	Sonu Nigam, K. S. Chithra	05:55
2.	"Aye Chand Teri"	Sonu Nigam, Alka Yagnik	07:27
3.	"Mujhe Pyaar Karo"	Sonu Nigam, Alka Yagnik	06:16
4.	"Chori Chori Chupke Chupke"	Babul Supriyo	06:29
5.	"Jo Ishq Ka Matlab"	Shankar Mahadevan	06:57
6.	"Qayamat Ho"	Sonu Nigam, Kavita Krishnamurthy	06:56
7.	"Agra Mein Hai"	Vinod Rathod, Farida & Nitin Shankar	06:28
8.	"Tera Jadoo Chal Gayaa"	Instrumental	05:51
Total length:			52:19

== Reception ==
Taran Adarsh of IndiaFM gave the film 1.5 out of 5, writing ″On the whole, TERA JADOO CHAL GAYAA has precious little to offer in terms of content and novelty.″

Rishita Roy Chowdhury of India Today wrote, "It was yet another story where a simpleton with a golden heart falls in love with an ambitious city girl. Add shoddy screenplay, unimpressive acting and caricatures for characters in the mix and you will be left wondering who in their right mind would let Tera Jadoo Chal Gayaa go on for 2 hours and 50 minutes.
