= Deal Raja =

- Directed by: Rajgopi
- Written by: Rajgopi
- Screenplay by: Rajgopi
- Produced by: K. Murthy; Ravichandra Reddy; Suresh N Srikanth Reddy
- Starring: Komal Kumar; Bhanu Sri Mehra; Ithi Acharya; Suman Ranganathan
- Cinematography: Jai Anand
- Edited by: N M Vishwa
- Music by: Abhimann Roy
- Production company: Meghadooth Movies
- Distributed by: Meghadooth Movies
- Release date: 29 July 2016
- Running time: 165 minutes
- Country: India
- Language: Kannada

Deal Raja is a 2016 Indian Kannada-language comedy film written and directed by Rajgopi. The movie stars Komal Kumar, Bhanu Sri Mehra and Ithi Acharya. The music is composed by Abhimann Roy.

The trailer of the film received positive hype on social media networks. The film was released on 29 July 2016.

== Plot ==
Raja (Komal Kumar) is a smooth-talking conman hired by a group of fraudsters to locate the only person who knows the secrets to immense wealth. What begins as a simple job soon turns into a journey of love and moral reflection, as Raja confronts his own conscience and the consequences of his schemes.

== Cast ==
- Komal Kumar as Deal Raja
- Bhanu Sri Mehra
- Iti Acharya
- Suman Ranganathan
- Bullet Prakash
- Sadhu Kokila
- Tabla Nani
- Jai Jagadish
- Mithra
- Kuri Prathap
- Suchendra Prasad
- Ramakrishna
- Bose Venkat

== Soundtrack ==
Deal Raja

Soundtrack album by Abhimann Roy
- Genre: Feature film soundtrack

== Soundtrack ==
The film's soundtrack was composed by Abhimann Roy. The album consists of five tracks with lyrics written by K. Kalyan and Sagar.

=== Track listing ===
| No. | Title | Lyrics | Singer(s) | Length |
|---|---|---|---|---|
| 1. | "Deal Raja" | Sagar | Tippu, Supriya Lohith |
| 2. | "Ninnanne Nambiruve Padmavathi" | Abhimann Roy | Badri Prasad |
| 3. | "Ringswamy" | Rajgopi | Tippu, Rapid Rashmi |
| 4. | "Hudgiryako Kettodrappa" | Abhimann Roy | L. R. Ramanujam, Margaret Rita |
| 5. | "Yaarige Yaaruillve" | K. Kalyan | Basavaraj Mugalkode |

== Production ==
The film was directed by Raj Gopi Surya, who had previously worked as an associate with S. Narayan and made his directorial debut with Sadagara. Deal Raja received attention for its commercial success, with reports noting that despite being a low-profile release it managed to become a "surprise hit" in the Kannada film industry.

== Reception ==
=== Critical response ===
A critic from The Times of India wrote that "This film is meant for those who love their dose of double entendre and mindless comedy, though be ready for a few long, unnecessary scenes through the entertaining plot".
