= Vasuki Anand =

Indian actress

- Occupation: Actress
- Years active: 1995–1999; 2022–present
- Spouse: Anand Sai

Vasuki Anand is an Indian actress who works in Telugu films and television shows and a few Tamil television shows.

== Career ==
Vasuki began her career in television and made her feature film debut with Tholi Prema (1998) portraying Pawan Kalyan's sister, which fetched her the Nandi Award for Best Supporting Actress. She went on to work in 23 television serials. She then took a sabbatical and returned to films with Anni Manchi Sakunamule (2023).

== Personal life ==
She married art director Anand Sai after meeting him on the sets of Tholi Prema.

== Filmography ==
- All films are in Telugu

Year	Title	Role	Notes
1998	Tholi Prema	Priya	Won–Nandi Award for Best Supporting Actress
2023	Anni Manchi Sakunamule	Gayathri Prasad	
2024	The Family Star	Manju	
2025	Sundarakanda	Megha	
2025	Beauty	Janaki	
2026	Srinivasa Mangapuram	Varalakshmi	
2026	Epic - First Semester	Rani	
2026	Summer Holidays	Janaki	

=== Television ===
Year	Title	Role	Network	Language	Notes
1995	Chinna China Aasai Minnal	Jaanu		Tamil	
1996–1997	Marmadesam	Lalitha	Sun TV	Tamil	Ragasiyam segment
1997	Nimmathi Ungal Choice 1			Tamil	
1998	Aachi International			Tamil	
1998	Aalu Magalu		ETV	Telugu	
1998–1999	Ramany vs Ramany	Ramany	Sun TV	Tamil	
2022	Ramany vs Ramany 3.0	Ramany	Aha	Tamil	
2024	90's – A Middle Class Biopic	Sobha Rani	ETV Win	Telugu	
