= Varudu =

- Theatrical release poster
- Directed by: Gunasekhar
- Written by: Story & Screenplay: Gunasekhar; Dialogues: Thota Prasadnaidu
- Produced by: D. V. V. Danayya
- Starring: Allu Arjun; Arya; Bhanu Sri Mehra
- Cinematography: R. D. Rajasekhar
- Edited by: Anthony
- Music by: Mani Sharma
- Production company: Universal Media
- Release date: 31 March 2010
- Running time: 147 minutes
- Country: India
- Language: Telugu

Varudu (transl. Bridegroom) is a 2010 Indian Telugu-language action drama film directed by Gunasekhar and produced by D. V. V. Danayya. The film stars Allu Arjun, Arya, and Bhanu Sri Mehra, while Suhasini Mani Ratnam, Ashish Vidyarthi, and Brahmanandam, among others, play supporting roles. The music was composed by Mani Sharma. The film released on 31 March 2010 to highly negative reviews and became a box-office disaster. The film was dubbed into Malayalam as Varan.

== Plot ==
Sandeep Nemani "Sandy" is a next-gen youngster who parties hard and has a modern outlook, but his ideas towards marriage are traditional. As he gets a job in the US, his parents, Vasanthi and Raj Gopal, who got married against their respective parents' wishes, ask him to get married. He accepts and tells them he will marry a girl of their choice in a ceremony that lasts five days. He also refuses to see his bride until the marriage. Everything is arranged according to his wishes, and his marriage is fixed with Deepthi.

At the ceremony, when Sandy and Deepthi see each other, they fall in love at first sight, but during the ceremony, Deepthi gets kidnapped by Diwakar, a local psycho gangster with a characterization rooted in obsession rather than typical villainy. Sandy's family tries to convince him for another marriage, but he refuses and tries to find Deepthi. He gets to know her whereabouts. Diwakar kidnaps Deepthi to take revenge on her as she slapped him for misbehaving with her in public. The police are killed by Diwakar and his men. Sandy takes the law into his hands, kidnaps Diwakar's brother Prabhakar, and threatens to kill him if Diwakar does not release Deepthi. Diwakar releases Deepthi and kills Prabhakar in front of them because Prabhakar wanted Deepthi.

In the scuffle, Sandeep challenges Diwakar to come to their marriage and try to kidnap Deepthi in front of his eyes, to which he agrees. Sandy and Deepthi get married successfully, this time with all the rituals. When they step out of the mandap, Diwakar attacks Sandy. A fight happens in which Sandy confronts Diwakar and kills him. Sandy and Deepthi then live happily ever after.

== Cast ==
- Allu Arjun as Nemani Sandeep "Sandy"
- Arya as Diwakar
- Bhanu Sri Mehra as Deepthi, Sandy's wife
- Suhasini Mani Ratnam as Advocate Nemani Vasanthi, Sandeep's mother
- Ashish Vidyarthi as Nemani Raj Gopal, Sandeep's father
- Naresh as Deepthi's father
- Vinaya Prasad as Deepthi's mother
- Singeetam Srinivasa Rao as Sandy's grandfather
- Kishori Ballal as Sandeep's grandmother
- Nassar as Commissioner Ahmed Khan IPS
- Brahmanandam as Dilip Raja
- Sayaji Shinde as Home Minister Gopal Krishna Reddy
- Rao Ramesh as ACP Umesh Gupta IPS
- Ahuti Prasad as Prabhakar, Diwakar's brother
- Diksha Panth as Sandy's friend
- Kondavalasa Lakshmana Rao as Diwakar's assistant
- Fish Venkat as Diwakar's assistant
- Harsha Vardhan as Babji
- Pradeep Machiraju as Abhiram
- Anita Chowdary as Sindhu, Shyam's wife
- Sameer as Shyam, Sindhu's husband
- Karuna as Deepti's friend
- Simran Choudhary as Sandy's friend
- Raghava as Dilip Raja's assistant
- Mahen
- Balaraju
- Kuldip Patel
- Neha Patel
- Sneha Ullal as Nisha (Cameo appearance)
- Ali (Cameo appearance)
- Sunil (Cameo appearance)
- Sony John (Cameo appearance)

== Soundtrack ==
Varudu

Soundtrack album by Mani Sharma
- Released: 7 March 2010
- Recorded: 2010
- Genre: Film soundtrack
- Length: 36:38
- Label: Aditya Music
- Producer: Mani Sharma

Mani Sharma chronology
Sura (2010)	Varudu (2010)	Mappillai (2010)

Though Singer Malavika sang the song Relare Relare, Geetha Madhuri who lent vocals for only very few lines, was credited as the singer. The audio rendered by Mani Sharma was launched on 7 March 2010 at Ramanaidu Studios in Hyderabad. The audio was released in the market by Aditya Music. The event was held in a wedding atmosphere with the cast and crew dressed in traditional attire. The audio CDs were released by S. S. Rajamouli, and the first copy was received by Allu Aravind. The audio cassettes were released by Shyam Prasad Reddy, and he presented the first copy to Daggubati Suresh Babu. The function began with the dance performances for Allu Arjun's earlier film songs. Veturi was felicitated at the Audio Release function, and it turned out to be his penultimate movie before his death on 22 May 2010.

Malavika (singer)

All tracks are written by Veturi.

No.	Title	Artist(s)	Length
1.	"Om Namahaa (Saare Jahaa.. Prema Raa)"	Benny Dayal	4:46
2.	"Aidu Rojula Pelli"	K. Jamuna Rani, Hemachandra, Malavika, Vijayalakshmi, Sunandha, Ranjith	8:43
3.	"Kalalu Kaavule"	Hemachandra, Malavika	4:24
4.	"Talambraalato"	Hemachandra, Malavika	3:20
5.	"Bahusha O Chanchalaa"	Sonu Nigam, Shreya Ghoshal	6:13
6.	"Aidu Rojula Pelli" (Traditional Version)	Hemachandra, Malavika	4:51
7.	"Relaare Relaare"	Karthik, Malavika, Geetha Madhuri	4:21
Total length:			36:38

=== Home media ===
The satellite rights of the film acquired by Gemini TV. Present the film is available on Sun NXT and Hungama Play.

== Reception ==
A critic from Rediff.com wrote that "Gunasekhar has taken quite a bit of time after the 'disastrous' Sainikudu to come up with the mainstream Varudu wherein he has concentrated on the visual presentation and graphics more than on the content. Worth a watch".

== Awards ==
- 2010 – Nandi Award for Best Special Effects – Sri Alagar Swamy.
