= Gunasekhar =

Indian filmmaker (born 1964)

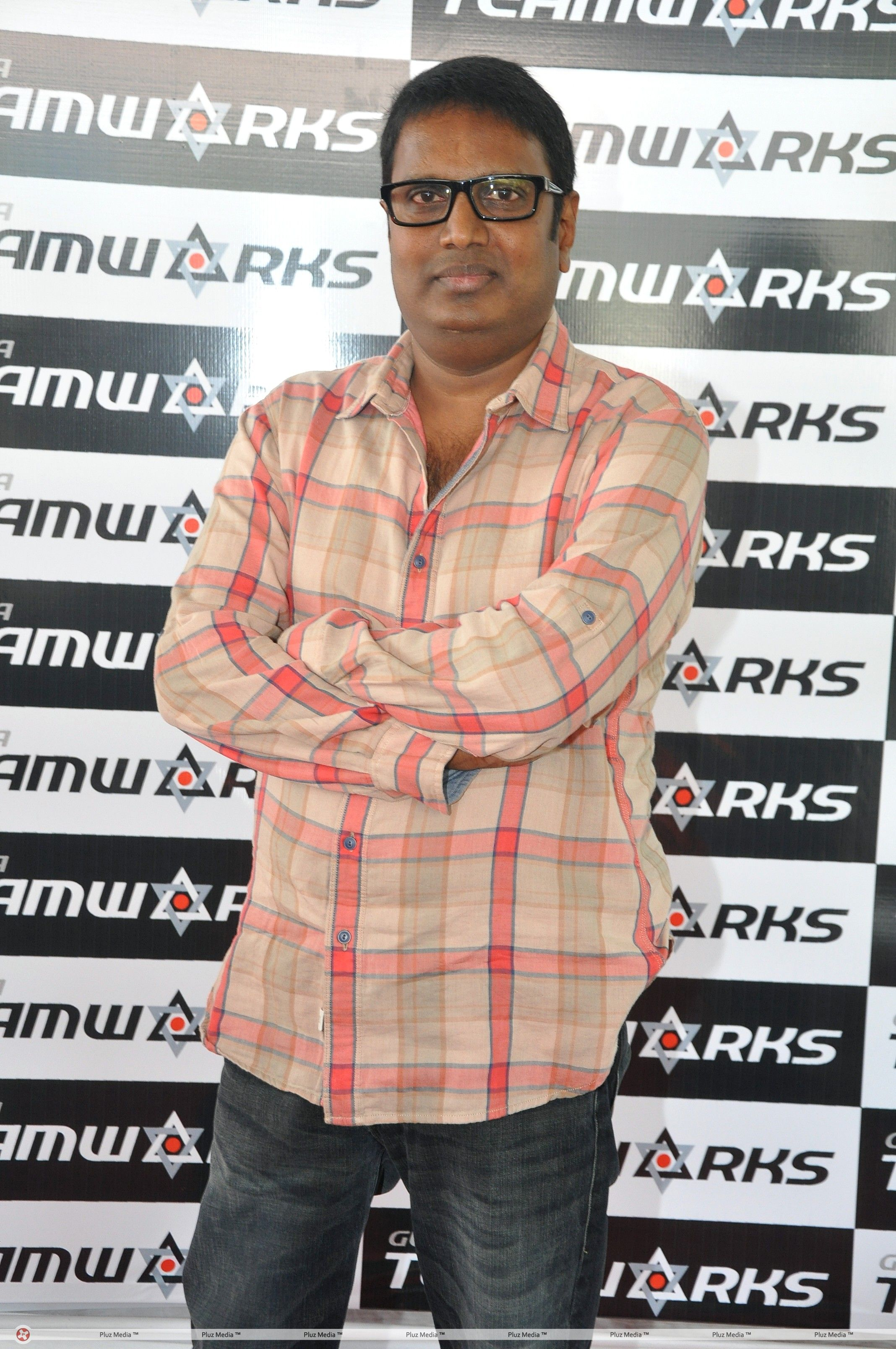
- Gunasekhar in 2015
- Born: Gunasekhar; 2 June 1964 (age 62); Narsipatnam, Andhra Pradesh, India
- Occupations: Director; screenwriter; producer
- Spouse: Ragini
- Children: 2; including Neelima

Gunasekhar (born 2 June 1964) is an Indian film director and screenwriter known for his works in Telugu cinema. He has directed films in action, romance, mythological, and historical drama genres. He has won a National Film Award, multiple Nandi Awards, a Filmfare Award South, and a Gaddar Award.

Gunasekhar directed the historical epic film Ramayanam (1997), which won the National Film Award for Best Children's Film and was screened at the International Children's Film Festival of India. His 2003 action film, Okkadu was huge commercial success and was remade into various Indian languages. His other notable films include Sogasu Chooda Tharamaa (1995), Choodalani Vundi (1998), Manoharam (2000), and Rudhramadevi (2015).

== Career ==
Before venturing into mainstream film direction, Gunasekar worked as an associate director to D. V. Narsaraju, Kranthi Kumar, and Ram Gopal Varma. Gunasekhar made his directorial debut with the socio-political Lathi (1992), for which he received the state Nandi Award for Best First Film of a Director.

He directed the super-hit romance film, Sogasu Chooda Tharamaa (1995), which received the Nandi Award for Best Feature Film. In 1997, Gunasekhar directed the mythological film Ramayanam, which won the National Film Award for Best Children's Film and was screened at the International Children's Film Festival of India.

His next film was the action thriller Choodalani Vundi (1998), which introduced the DTS sound to the Telugu screen and was a box-office hit. The film was later remade into Hindi as, Calcutta Mail. He then directed the political thriller, Manoharam (2000), which again bagged the Nandi Award for Best Story, and the Nandi Award for Best Feature Film.

His 2003 action drama, Okkadu, starring Mahesh Babu and Bhumika Chawla, was a huge critical and commercial success, becoming the highest-grossing Telugu film of that year and was remade into various Indian languages; it catapulted Mahesh Babu to superstardom. He reunited with Mahesh Babu and Prakash Raj in the 2004 action drama film, Arjun, which released to mixed reviews upon release and ended up becoming an average grosser. It was screened at the International Film Festival of India, in the mainstream section.

He reunited with them again in the 2006 action drama, Sainikudu, produced by C. Aswini Dutt. It opened to mixed-to-negative reviews upon release and became a huge commercial disaster. He collaborated with Allu Arjun in the 2010 romantic thriller, Varudu, produced by D. V. V. Danayya. It opened to negative reviews upon release and like Sainikudu, became a huge commercial disaster. He collaborated with Ravi Teja in the 2012 action drama, Nippu, produced by Y. V. S. Chowdary. Like Sainikudu and Varudu, it opened to widespread criticism and was a huge commercial disaster.

His 2015 historical film, Rudhramadevi, starring Anushka Shetty, Rana Daggubati, and Allu Arjun and produced by himself, opened to mixed reviews upon release. Despite that, it managed to became an average grosser owing to the stardom of Anushka and Allu Arjun. His last venture was the mythological romantic drama film Shaakuntalam, which released on 14 April 2023 to highly negative reviews and became a huge commercial failure.

== Personal life ==
Gunasekhar is married to Ragini, and the couple have two daughters, Neelima and Yukhta.

== Filmography and awards ==
Year	Film	Director	Producer	Screenwriter	Awards and Honors
1992	Laati	Yes	No	Yes	Nandi Award for Best First Film of a Director
1995	Sogasu Chooda Tharamaa	Yes	No	Yes	Nandi Award for Best Screenplay Writer
1997	Ramayanam	Yes	No	Yes	National Film Award for Best Children's Film; International Children's Film Festival of India
1998	Choodalani Vundi	Yes	No	Yes	
2000	Manoharam	Yes	No	Yes	
2001	Mrugaraju	Yes	No	Yes	
2003	Okkadu	Yes	No	Yes	Nandi Award for Best Director; Filmfare Award for Best Director – Telugu
2004	Arjun	Yes	No	Yes	International Film Festival of India
2006	Sainikudu	Yes	No	Yes	
2010	Varudu	Yes	No	Yes	
2012	Nippu	Yes	No	Yes	
2015	Rudhramadevi	Yes	Yes	Yes	
2023	Shaakuntalam	Yes	Yes	Yes	New York International Film Awards
2026	Euphoria	Yes	Yes	Yes	

=== Frequent collaborators ===
Collaborator	Laati; (1992)	Sogasu Chooda Tharamaa; (1995)	Ramayanam; (1997)	Choodalani Vundi; (1998)	Manoharam; (2000)	Mrugaraju; (2001)	Okkadu; (2003)	Arjun; (2004)	Sainikudu; (2006)	Varudu; (2010)	Nippu; (2012)	Rudhramadevi; (2015)	Shaakuntalam; (2023)	Euphoria; (2026)
Mani Sharma				Yes	Yes	Yes	Yes	Yes		Yes			Yes	
Sekhar V. Joseph		Yes	Yes		Yes	Yes	Yes	Yes					Yes	
A. Sreekar Prasad							Yes	Yes	Yes			Yes		
Mahesh Babu							Yes	Yes	Yes					
Prakash Raj				Yes	Yes	Yes	Yes	Yes	Yes			Yes	Yes	
Brahmanandam				Yes		Yes				Yes	Yes			
Nassar								Yes		Yes				Yes
Ajay							Yes		Yes			Yes		
Brahmaji	Yes			Yes	Yes						Yes			
Surya	Yes				Yes	Yes								
M. S. Narayana				Yes	Yes	Yes	Yes	Yes						
Dharmavarapu Subramanyam							Yes		Yes		Yes			
Gundu Hanumantha Rao				Yes		Yes	Yes							
