= Tholi Prema (1998 film) =

1998 Indian film by A. Karunakaran

- Theatrical release poster
- Directed by: A. Karunakaran
- Written by: Chintapalli Ramana (dialogues)
- Screenplay by: A. Karunakaran
- Story by: A. Karunakaran
- Produced by: G. V. G. Raju
- Starring: Pawan Kalyan; Keerthi Reddy
- Cinematography: Chota K. Naidu
- Edited by: Marthand K. Venkatesh
- Music by: Deva
- Production company: SSC Arts
- Release date: 24 July 1998
- Running time: 146 minutes
- Country: India
- Language: Telugu

Tholi Prema (transl. First Love) is a 1998 Indian Telugu-language romantic drama film written and directed by A. Karunakaran. It stars Pawan Kalyan and Keerthi Reddy, with music composed by Deva. The cinematography was done by Y. Maheedhar and Chota K. Naidu.

The film was a super blockbuster at the box-office and considered to be a breakthrough for Pawan Kalyan. It is considered as one of the most iconic romantic films in Telugu cinema. It won the National Film Award for Best Feature Film in Telugu, six state Nandi Awards, and was featured in the Indian Panorama mainstream section at the 30th International Film Festival of India. The film was later dubbed into Tamil as Anandha Mazhai, remade in Kannada as Preethsu Thappenilla (2000), and in Hindi as Mujhe Kucch Kehna Hai (2001).

== Plot ==
Balu is the youngest son in his family and carefree. His father often scolds him, but his uncle and mother dote on him, and so does his brother. He has a bunch of friends to hang around. On a late Diwali night, Balu's father is angry with him, and he goes out for a stroll. On this night, Balu happens to see a girl Anu playing with children. He instantly falls for her. Later, he encounters various circumstances but can't reach her.

Meanwhile, Anu is impressed with Balu when he saves a child's life on the motorway unknown to him; she tries to get his autograph but fails. Balu leaves for Ooty for his studies and accidentally meets Anu on the way when his taxi breaks down. Anu gives Balu a lift and leaves her driver to help the taxi driver. While on the way, Anu's car slips into a valley due to a rash lorry driver. Enraged, Balu makes an effort to save Anu and rescues her to safer ground. Trying to save Anu, Balu slips off into a valley. Anu is depressed that Balu sacrificed himself to save her, searches for him, and loses hope. Balu is saved by a truck driver and admitted to a hospital.

On his return, Anu meets Balu at his house to express her gratitude. Balu thinks of proposing his love to Anu but is warned by his sister Priya, a medical student, who says she might reject his proposal. Following Priya's suggestion, Balu develops a friendship with Anu but never dares to express his love. Anu becomes a good friend to Balu their families become close. Later, he learned that recently, her parents died in a plain crash she has returned from the US to spend time with her grandfather. Later, Priya reveals that after observing Balu's sincere love, she decided to accept her senior proposal for marriage, which has a bald head after learning this Balu with a heavy heart accepts Priya's decision. Later, Priya marriage proceedings begin at home.

At the same time, on her birthday, Anu is admitted to Harvard University and is about to leave. Then give a return gift, which is a cricket bat who encourage him to play cricket and wishes to go higher levels in Indian Cricket which makes him realize his goal to become an International Cricketer. After knowing that she is going back to the US, he becomes shattered and decides not to reveal his love to her. In Priya's marriage, she gets to know that she is leaving, then asks her brother to talk regarding his love. Then Balu stops Priya for not revealing his love towards Anu and later stops his whole family. Except his uncle, who went with Priya to her in-laws' house for a send-off. Later, he got to know all the facts and became angry and went to the airport to stop Anu.

Meanwhile, in the airport, all remain silent. Finally, Anu takes Balu's autograph to whom she earlier wants to take, and Anu initially thinks why she takes Balu with her for the send-off by leaving her own family. Then they wait for the flight announcement, and then both look back at their past with each other. Then Anu realizes that she is indeed in love with Balu. She gets emotional and expresses her love towards him, then immediately replies yes. Then Anu says that she needs him more than Harvard and cries for did not like to leave him and says she will not go to Harvard. An emotional Balu iterates that she has worked hard, and she is waiting for this day and shouldn't miss the chance for a sacred love. They agree to reunite after they have realized their goals and decide to maintain a long-distance relationship. The film ends with a happy note.

== Cast ==
- Pawan Kalyan as Balu
- Keerthi Reddy as Anu
- Vasuki Anand as Priya, Balu's sister
- Ali as Balu's friend
- Nagesh as Balu's uncle
- Venu Madhav as Arnold Sekhar
- Achyuth as Anil
- Prasanna Kumar
- Narra Venkateswara Rao as Viswanatham, Balu's father
- P. J. Sarma as Anu's grandfather
- Ravi Babu
- Vijay
- Jagan as Balu's friend
- Balu as Balu's friend
- Anil
- Sangeetha as Balu's mother
- Manisha
- Bangalore Padma
- A. Karunakaran in a cameo appearance as the scooty driver

== Production ==
A. Karunakaran saw the photograph of Pawan Kalyan on the cover of a Telugu film magazine in Chennai and felt he would be ideal for the lead role in his offbeat romantic film. After Karunakaran narrated the script to Kalyan, the latter introduced him to producer G. V. G. Raju, who had previously produced Gokulamlo Seeta (1997) with him.

A replica set of Taj Mahal was erected at Mahabalipuram for the song "Gagananiki Udayam".

== Soundtrack ==
The soundtrack was composed by Deva. Four of the film's five songs are based on other songs without acknowledgement: "Ee Manase Se Se" is based on "Alabalaba (Woman’a’Sexy)" by Dr. Alban, "Yemaindo Yemo Ee Vela" is based on Ricky Martin's "Maria", "Emi Sodhara" is based on "Pyar Ka Musafir" by Lucky Ali and "Romance Rhythms" is based on "Noonday Sun" by Deep Forest.

Track listing
No.	Title	Lyrics	Singer(s)	Length
1.	"Ee Manase Se Se"	Sirivennela Sitarama Sastry	S. P. Balasubrahmanyam	4:25
2.	"Yemaindo Yemo Ee Vela"	Bhuvanachandra	S. P. Balasubrahmanyam	4:43
3.	"Emi Sodhara"	Sirivennela Sitarama Sastry	Krishna Raj	4:26
4.	"Gagananiki Udayam"	Sirivennela Sitarama Sastry	S. P. Balasubrahmanyam	5:55
5.	"Romance Rhythms"	Bhuvanachandra	Suresh Peters, P. Unnikrishnan	4:46
Total length:				24:15

== Release ==
The film had run for more than 100 days in 21 centres; it ran for more than 200 days in 2 centres. It was the winner of six Nandi Awards and National Award Best Feature Film (Telugu) and ran for more than 365 days.

== Awards ==
Ceremony	Category	Nominee	Result
National Film Awards	National Film Award for Best Feature Film in Telugu	G. V. G. Raju	Won
Nandi Awards - 1998	Best Feature Film - Gold	Tholi Prema	Won
Nandi Awards - 1998	Best Supporting Actress	Vasuki Anand	Won
Nandi Awards - 1998	Best Screenplay Writer	A. Karunakaran	Won
Nandi Awards - 1998	Best First film of a Director	A. Karunakaran	Won
Nandi Awards - 1998	Best Audiographer	Madhu Sudhan	Won
Nandi Awards - 1998	Best Editor	Marthand K. Venkatesh	Won
