= Ramany vs Ramany =

Tamil Comedy Show

- Season 2 - DVD cover
- Genre: Sitcom
- Created by: Min Bimbangal
- Screenplay by: Naga (Part 1)
- Story by: B. Kailasam; C. J. Bhaskar (Part 1 dialogues); Usha Subramanian (Part 2 dialogues); Gopu Babu; Bharat Gopu; Vigneshwari Suresh; Prashanth (Part 3 dialogues)
- Directed by: Naga
- Starring: Babloo Prithiveeraj; Vasuki Anand; Ram G Devadarshini
- Composer: Rehaan
- Country of origin: India
- Original language: Tamil
- No. of seasons: 3
- No. of episodes: 76

Production
- Producers: Parts 1 and 2: Geeta B. Kailasam; Part 3: Pushpa Kandaswamy; Kandaswamy Bharathan
- Cinematography: Part 1: R. Narayan Kumar, B. Ulaganathan; Part 2: Anand Babu; Part 3: N. Sathish Kumar
- Editors: Part 3: Ramamoorthy S T.Ravikumar
- Running time: 20-27 minutes
- Production company: Min Bimbangal

Original release
- Network: Sun TV
- Release: 1998
- Network: Raj TV
- Release: 2001
- Network: aha
- Release: 2022

Ramany vs Ramany (also spelled as Ramani vs Ramani) is a Tamil-language sitcom directed by Naga and produced by K. Balachander under the banner of Min Bimbangal. It is recognized as the first ever Tamil sitcom. The series humorously depicts the daily life of a married couple, both named Ramany, highlighting their interpersonal clashes and quirky adventures. The narrative revolves around Mr. Ramany, an innocent sales representative, and Mrs. Ramany, a dissatisfied housewife who frequently laments her husband's shortcomings.

The series originally aired in two seasons. The first season, starring Vasuki Anand and Prithvi Raj, premiered on Sun TV in 1998 and consisted of 25 episodes. The second season, featuring Ram G and Devadarshini, aired on Raj TV in 2001 with a total of 51 episodes. Both seasons were later re-telecast on Vasanth TV and uploaded to Kavithalayaa's YouTube channel, where they gained a renewed audience and popularity.

In 2022, a third season titled Ramany vs Ramany 3.0 was released as a web series on aha. Vasuki Anand and Ram G reprised their roles from the earlier seasons, while Devadarshini did not return. The season marked the show's transition to digital platforms, with the first episode premiering on 4 March 2022.

== Plot ==
=== Season 1 ===
Season 1 - DVD cover

The story centers on Mr. Ramany (Prithivi Raj), the youngest child in a family with three older sisters. As the much-anticipated male child, he enjoys a privileged position in the family, which sparks jealousy among his sisters. Raised in a strict household with a father who enforces military-like discipline and a mother who constantly lectures as a primary school teacher, Mr. Ramany longs to escape his family environment and dreams of moving to the United States.

However, his plans are thwarted when his family insists he marries a woman with the same name, Ramany (Vasuki), who has briefly lived in the United States. Despite their shared name, the two are vastly different individuals with conflicting personalities and aspirations. The marriage, arranged by their families, leads to a comical dynamic as the couple struggles with their incompatibilities and frequent disagreements. The series humorously portrays their everyday life, exploring the challenges and quirks of their relationship.

=== Season 2 ===
Season 2 focuses on the comedic daily life of a middle-class household led by Mrs. Ramany (Devadarshini) and her husband Mr. Ramany (Ram G), along with their young daughter Ramya. The story explores the couple's longing for the carefree days of their early marriage and the ways their lives have evolved after becoming parents. Mr. Ramany, a humorous and innocent sales representative, frequently finds himself in troublesome situations, often requiring Mrs. Ramany to intervene and resolve them. Mrs. Ramany, a typical Tamil housewife, navigates the challenges of managing their household and often expresses frustration over her husband's lack of ambition, reminiscing about the better suitors she could have married. Despite her complaints, her practical nature helps the family overcome various challenges.

Their daughter Ramya serves as the voice of reason, often providing sensible insights during ridiculous situations. Nair, a family friend, lives in the outhouse for a nominal rent and frequently becomes entangled in the family's affairs. Uncle Chandhru, a well-meaning but overconfident man, often lands in trouble due to his limited knowledge. Adding to the humour are Mrs. Ramany's mother and the gossip-loving maid, Kamala, who contribute to the household's lively atmosphere.

== Cast ==
=== Season 1 ===
- Babloo Prithiveeraj as Mr.Ramany
- Vasuki as Mrs. Ramany
- Poovilangu Mohan as Mr. Ramany's father
- Mythily
- Gnanam
- Sreenivasan
- Judge Rajagopal
- Chetan as a thief/Sarathy
- Vivek
- Durga
- Thadi Balaji as Dr. Babu/Odissi dance shoot director (episodes 2,18)
- M. V. Raman
- Telephone Venkatraman
- Samuel
- Benjamin as Lawyer Krishnamoorthy (episode 7)
- Jayanthi
- Krishnan as Police officer (episode 10)
- R.K.D. Srinivasan
- Sambantham
- Rani
- Vinai
- Deepa Venkat as Lavanya, Mrs. Ramany's cousin sister (episode 15)
- Ramachandran
- Malini
- Sureshwar
- Ragavesh
- Priya Gariyali
- Riyaz Khan as Suresh, Mrs. Ramany's cousin brother (episodes 19,20)
- Hanumanthu

=== Season 2 ===
- Ram G as Mr. Ramany
- Devadarshini as Mrs. Ramany
- Nair Raman as Nair
- Sreenivasan as Chandramoulli
- Shobana as Kamala
- Baby Ranjitha as Ramya (Ramanys' daughter)
- Poovilangu Mohan as Renigunta Venkatrama Reddy (Mr. Ramany's boss) (episodes 20, 38, 43)
- M.Bhanumati as Sharada, Mrs.Ramany's mother
- Ajay Rathnam as Radhakrishnan, Mrs. Ramany's childhood friend (episodes 10,19)
- Krishnan as tennis player/film director (episodes 17, 45)
- Samuthirakani as Sales representative/Census taker/Director/Groom (episodes 11,31,45,51)
- Sadhasivam as Ramany's father
- Ramachandran as Dharmarajan/Hari Babu (episodes 33,34)
- Benjamin as Uttama Ulaganathan/man at the bus stop (episodes 33,34,37)
- Thadi Balaji as M.N. Dharmarajan (episode 41)
- S Gnanavel
- Mohan Vaidya as Mr. Ramany's uncle "Paatu Chittappa" (episode 21)
- Muthu Subramanium
- Brindha
- Ganesh Babu
- Karpagam
- Krishna
- Tharika as Chandra (episode 15)
- Thaatsayani
- Rangarajan
- Preeth
- Rushario
- Valli Nayagam
- T. K. S. Chandran as Doctor Reinsein Aayiravatham (episodes 27,32,37,45)
- Telephone Venkatraman
- Gnanavel
- Hari
- Rajesh
- Vijayapriya
- Ezhilarasi
- Mahesh
- 'Mimicry' Giri
- Kantha Rao
- Ganesan
- "Mittai" Shanmugam
- Vairavaraj
- Citizen Sivakumar
- Usha
- Mathiazhagan
- Amar
- Dhandapani
- Radhakrishnan

=== Season 3 ===
- Ram G as Mr. Ramany
- Vasuki Anand as Mrs. Ramany

== Production ==
"After Marmadesam, I wanted to relax a little bit and that is how Ramani Vs Ramani happened. It is a story that would be universally relatable. Like in my house, I fight with my wife and then we would patch up. In retrospect, the whole incident would be funny. Kailasam and I had many such experiences between us (laughs)"

— Naga on the sitcom, 2019.

Naga, the show's director, conceptualized the series as a relatable and comedic portrayal of married life. Renowned filmmaker K. Balachander produced the series, adding to its appeal with his banner Min Bimbangal.

The series' popularity was initially driven by its originality and humour, making it a standout amidst Tamil television's melodramatic offerings. Its re-telecast on Vasanth TV and availability on Kavithalayaa's YouTube channel revived interest among a new generation of viewers.

== Reception and legacy ==
Ramany vs Ramany is celebrated for its witty writing, engaging characters, and universal appeal. It became one of the most beloved Tamil sitcoms, maintaining its charm through repeated telecasts and a successful reboot. The show is considered a pioneering effort in Tamil television comedy, influencing subsequent sitcoms in the region.
