= G. V. G. Raju =

Indian film producer (born 1962)

- Born: April 12, 1962 (age 64)
- Occupation: Film producer
- Spouse: Padmaja (daughter of Haranath)

G. V. G. Raju (born 12 April 1962) is an Indian film producer in Telugu cinema. He is known for producing films like Tholi Prema (1998) and Godavari (2006). For Tholi Prema, he won the National Film Award for Best Feature Film in Telugu and Nandi Award for Best Feature Film - Gold. For Godavari, he won the Nandi Award for Second Best Feature Film - Silver.

He is married to Padmaja, daughter of Telugu actor Haranath.

== Filmography ==
Year	Film	Producer	Presenter
1997	Gokulamlo Seetha	No	Yes
1998	Tholi Prema	Yes	No
2001	Chirujallu	Yes	No
2006	Godavari	Yes	No
2006	Raraju	Yes	No
