= International Children's Film Festival India =

International Children's Film Festival India (ICFFI)
- Location: Hyderabad, Telangana, India
- Founded: 1955
- Hosted by: Children's Film Society
- Festival date: November 14–20
- Website: Official website

The International Children's Film Festival India (ICFFI), popularly known as the Golden Elephant, was a film festival conducted for seven days November 14 (Children's Day) and November 20th every two years which is aimed to bring together national and international children's cinema to young audiences in India. It was regularly held for seven days between

The festival was organized by the Children's Film Society which was formed in 1955 and which was chaired by Mukesh Khanna until the Society merged with the National Film Development Corporation of India in 2022.

== History ==
The 19th festival took place from November 14 through November 20, 2015. Indian films won nine awards, the largest for any country, but the overall winner was the Russian film Celestial Camel directed by Irina Plisko and Mikhail Plisko.

The 20th edition of the festival took place from 8 to 14 November 2017 in Hyderabad. The festival had four competition sections: International Live Action, Asian Panorama, International Animation and Little Directors, where international and national films compete for the prestigious Golden Elephant Trophies and cash awards. The festival also screened non-competition sections including Children's World that showcased films from across the world. The theme for the festival was “Digital India” – keeping in touch with the digital revolution now touching children's lives and also staying abreast with the times. This edition received the highest number of entries — 1,204 from 80 countries. In 2013, there were 894 from 48. Information and Broadcasting Minister Arun Jaitley unveiled a mobile app for the festival on the inaugural day. The arts, crafts and cultural village of Shilparamam in Hyderabad was a set for screenings of children's movies in multiple venues in the city.

According to the Times of India, the 20th festival may have been its last. The 2019 festival was supposedly canceled because it conflicted with the Telegana state elections. It was then postponed in 2020 and 2021 due to the COVID-19 pandemic in India. In 2022, the Children's Society merged with the National Film Development Corporation which did not respond to requests about the 21st festival.

== Awards ==
Awards for films in Competition Little Directors

- A Golden Elephant trophy for Best Little Director
- A Golden Plaque for Second Best Little Director
- A Golden Elephant trophy for Best Little Director – Special Mention by Jury

Awards for films in Competition International Animation

- A Golden Elephant trophy for Best Animation
- A Golden plaque for Second Best Animation
- A Golden Elephant trophy for Best Animation, Children's Jury

Awards for films in Competition International Live Action

- A Golden Elephant trophy for Best Live Action
- A Golden plaque for Second Best Live Action
- A Golden Elephant trophy for Best Live Action Director
- A Golden Elephant trophy for Best Live Action Screenplay
- A Golden Elephant trophy for Best Live Action, Children's Jury

Awards for films in Competition Asian Panorama

- A Golden Elephant trophy for Best Asian Panorama
- A Golden plaque for Second Best Asian Panorama
- A Golden Elephant trophy for Best Asian Panorama Children's Jury
