= Nandi Award for Best Supporting Actress =

Indian film award

The Nandi Award for Best Supporting Actress was instituted in 1981.

Year	Actress	Film
2016	Jayasudha	Sathamanam Bhavati
2015	Ramya Krishna	Baahubali: The Beginning
2014	Lakshmi Manchu	Chandamama Kathalu
2013	Nadhiya	Attarintiki Daredi
2012	Shyamala Devi	Veerangam
2011	Sujatha Reddy	Inkennallu
2010	Pragathi	Yemaindi Ee Vela
2009	Ramya Krishna	Raja Maharaju
2008	Raksha	Nachavule
2007	Janaki	Amoolyam
2006	Eeswari	Ganga
2005	Bhanupriya	Chhatrapati
2004	Satya Krishnan	Anand
2003	Talluri Rameswari	Nijam
2002	Bhanupriya	Lahiri Lahiri Lahirilo
2001	Suhasini	Nuvvu Naaku Nachav
2000	Jhansi	Jayam Manade Raa
1999	Radhika	Prema Katha
1998	Vasuki Anand	Tholi Prema
1997	Jhansi	Thodu
1996	Ranjitha	Maavichiguru
1995	Vaishnavi	Subha Sankalpam
1994	Roja	Anna
1993	Urmila Matondkar	Gaayam
1992	Jayachitra	Rajeswari Kalyanam
1991	Gautami	Chakravyuham
1990	Malashri	Prema Khaidi
1989	Jayasudha	Swathi Chinukulu
1988	Kalpana	Sagatu Manishi
1987	Radhika	Karthika Purnima
1986	Sowcar Janaki	Samsaram Oka Chadarangam
1985	Nirmalamma	Mayuri
1984	Sarada	Bobbili Brahmanna
1983	K. Sakuntala	Rangula Kala
1982	Annapurna	Manishiko Charitra
1981	Prabha	Dharma Vaddi

== See also ==
- Nandi Awards
- Cinema of Andhra Pradesh
