= Nandi Award for Best Editor =

Indian film award

The Nandi Award for Best Editor is given by the Andhra Pradesh state government as part of its annual Nandi Awards for Telugu films since 1981. This is a list of the Nandi Award winners for Best Editor since 1981.

Year	Editor	Film
1981	G. G. Krishna Rao	Saptapadi
1982	R. Hanumantha Rao	Keerthi Kantha Kanakam
1983	G. G. Krishna Rao	Sagara Sangamam
1984	Gautham Raju	Srivariki Premalekha
1985	Gautham Raju	Mayuri
1986	Anil Malnad	Alapana
1987	Gautham Raju	Chandamama Raave
1988	Gautham Raju	Hai Hai Nayaka
1989	Gautham Raju	Bharatha Naari
1990	Krishnan	Magaadu
1991	Shankar	Kshana Kshanam
1992	Shankar	Laati
1993	Shankar	Gaayam
1994	Ravindra Babu	Hello Brother
1995	G. G. Krishna Rao	Subha Sankalpam
1996	K. Ramgopal Reddy	Gunshot
1997	Shankar	Hello I Love You
1998	Marthand K. Venkatesh	Tholi Prema
1999	Shankar	Samudram
2000	A. Sreekar Prasad	Manoharam
2001	Marthand K. Venkatesh	Daddy
2002	Gautham Raju	Aadi
2003	A. Sreekar Prasad	Okkadu
2004	Kotagiri Venkateswara Rao	Sye
2005	Kotagiri Venkateswara Rao	Subash Chandra Bose
2006	Marthand K. Venkatesh	Pokiri
2007	Kotagiri Venkateswara Rao	Yamadonga
2008	Marthand K. Venkatesh	Arundhati
2009	Kotagiri Venkateswara Rao	Magadheera
2010	Kotagiri Venkateswara Rao	Darling
2011	M. R. Varma	Dookudu
2012	Kotagiri Venkateswara Rao	Eega
2013	Prawin Pudi	Kaalicharan
2014	Kotagiri Venkateswara Rao	Legend
2015	Naveen Nooli	Ladies & Gentlemen
2016	Naveen Nooli	Nannaku Prematho
