= Godavari (2006 film) =

Indian romantic comedy film

- Theatrical poster
- Directed by: Sekhar Kammula
- Written by: Sekhar Kammula
- Produced by: G. V. G. Raju
- Starring: Sumanth; Kamalinee Mukherjee; Neetu Chandra
- Cinematography: Vijay C. Kumar
- Edited by: Marthand K. Venkatesh
- Music by: K. M. Radha Krishnan
- Production company: SSC Arts
- Distributed by: Amigos Creations; KAD Entertainment (USA)
- Release date: 19 May 2006
- Running time: 160 minutes
- Country: India
- Language: Telugu

Godavari is a 2006 Indian Telugu-language romantic comedy drama film written and directed by Sekhar Kammula, and produced by G. V. G. Raju. Sumanth and Kamalinee Mukherjee played the lead roles. The music of the film was composed by K. M. Radha Krishnan.

The film follows Sriram, an idealistic political aspirant, and Sita, an independent fashion designer, as they embark on a transformative houseboat journey on the Godavari River. amidst diverse co-passengers.

The film achieved significant commercial success at the box office and garnered unanimous critical acclaim. It received several Nandi Awards and Filmfare Awards. Godavari has been called a modern classic of Telugu cinema.

== Plot ==
Sriram "Ramudu", an idealistic Master's graduate from the United States, returns to India to pursue a career in politics, though his progressive principals are met with skepticism by traditional politicians. He is in love with his cross cousin Rajeswari "Raji", but her father rejects Ramudu due to his modest financial standing, favouring Ravinder "Ravi", an arrogant IPS officer.

Realising that Raji is lured by financial security and hesitant about his future, a heartbroken Ramudu boards a river cruise on Godavari heading to Bhadrachalam to attend her wedding. Simultaneously, Seetha Mahalakshmi, an independent fashion designer nursing a failed boutique venture and a rejected marriage proposal, boards the same cruise to escape her family's pressure.

The voyage hosts a varied group of passengers whose lives intersect: Chinna, a young balloon vendor seeking to support his mentally ill mother; Kotigadu, a stray dog who becomes Chinna's loyal companion; Veerayya, a murder witness fleeing goons with his pregnant daughter; and a fortune teller whose caged parrot longs for freedom. After an initial confrontation when Ramudu carries Seetha onto the boat without her consent, the two overcome their misunderstandings and develop a close friendship.

Seetha falls for Ramudu's integrity and begins recording her feelings in a diary. During a boat-organised treasure hunt, Seetha asks Ramudu to let Chinna win the ₹50,000 prize for his mother's medical needs, a request Ramudu willingly grants. Meanwhile, Raji experiences Ravi's chauvinistic behaviour, and envious of the growing intimacy between Ramudu and Seetha, impulsively asks Ramudu to marry her instead.

Ramudu sends a written message to Raji via the fortune teller's bird, but the parrot escapes, dropping the note in Seetha's hands. Believing Ramudu still loves Raji, Seetha grows devastated, while Chinna swallows the note to prevent Raji from seeing it. With the rendezvous missed, Raji proceeds with her wedding to Ravi, while a guilt-ridden Seetha leaves the cruise abruptly. Later, Ramudu discovers Seetha's forgotten diary and learns of her love.

Ramudu travels to Seetha's home in Hyderabad, and clarifies that the note sent to Raji was intentionally left blank to force her to confront her own indecisiveness, affirming that his love belongs solely to Seetha. Overjoyed, Seetha accepts his marriage proposal, and Ramudu prepares to launch his political career after receiving offers from major political parties.

== Cast ==
- Sumanth as Sriram "Ramudu"
- Kamalinee Mukherjee as Seetha Mahalakshmi "Seetha" (voice-over by Sunitha)
- Neetu Chandra as Rajeswari "Raji" (voice-over by Haritha)
- Kamal Kamaraju as Ravinder "Ravi" Bommireddy IPS, Raji's fiancee
- C. V. L. Narasimha Rao as Seetha's father
- Lalitha Sindhuri as Madhu, Seetha's sister
- Madhumani as Subba Lakshmi; Seetha's mother and guide.
- Tanikella Bharani as Captain Chintamani
- Shiva as Chinna
- Karate Kalyani as Pullamma
- Rajendra Ch as Veerayya
- Sri Bindu as Kalyani, Veerayya’s daughter
- K.V. Subba Rao as Raji's father
- Nala Kumari as Raji's mother
- Saraswathamma as Ramudu's grandmother
- Sri Ramam as Chilakaramudu
- Mahesh as Ravi's father
- Usha Sree as Ravi's mother
- Shekhar Kammula as the voice of Kotigadu, the stray dog

== Production ==
Kammula said the film carries a similar essence and feel of Andala Ramudu (1973) directed by Bapu. Speaking to Idlebrain, Sekhar Kammula told that "I wanted an overwhelming backdrop for this film. I watched Andala Ramudu on TV when I was in the 10th class. It left an everlasting impact on me. It made me want to go to Rajahmundry to feel the Godavari River".

About 70% of the film was shot on the Godavari River in Andhra Pradesh.

== Music ==
The soundtrack and score of the film was composed by K. M. Radha Krishnan. The track "Andamgalena" sung by Sunitha Upadrashta won her a Nandi Award for Best Female Playback Singer. The track "Manasa Vaacha" sung by K.S.Chithra, and P. Unnikrishnan was also nominated at the Filmfare Awards South in the Best Female Playback Singer.

All lyrics are written by Veturi.

Track Listing
No.	Title	Singer(s)	Length
1.	"Uppongele Godavari"	S. P. Balasubrahmanyam
2.	"Andamgalena"	Sunitha Upadrashta
3.	"Manasa Gelupu"	Shankar Mahadevan, K. S. Chithra and K. M. Radha Krishnan
4.	"Tippulu Tappulu"	Shreya Ghoshal
5.	"Manasa Vaacha"	K. S. Chitra, P. Unnikrishnan
6.	"Raama Chakkani"	Gayathri

== Release and reception ==
Godavari was initially scheduled to release in December 2005 but was ultimately released on 19 May 2006 due to delay in the production.

Jeevi of Idlebrain gave a rating of 3.75 of 5 and wrote that "On a whole, Godavari film is another Sekhar Kammula's film with good sensibilities and emotions. Godavari film is as good as Anand if not better". Radhika Rajamani of Rediff.com opined that "Godavari scores on all fronts and is worth a watch". In an article published by The Hindu, G Venkataramana Rao praised Vijay C. Kumar's work.

== Accolades ==
Ceremony	Category	Nominee	Result	Ref.
Nandi Awards	Second Best Feature Film	G. V. G. Raju	Won	
Nandi Awards	Best Director	Sekhar Kammula	Won	
Nandi Awards	Best Music Director	K. M. Radha Krishnan	Won	
Nandi Awards	Best Cinematographer	Vijay C. Kumar	Won	
Nandi Awards	Best Female Playback Singer	Sunitha (for "Andamgalena")	Won	
54th Filmfare Awards South	Best Film – Telugu	G. V. G. Raju	Nominated	
54th Filmfare Awards South	Best Director – Telugu	Sekhar Kammula	Nominated	
54th Filmfare Awards South	Best Actress – Telugu	Kamalinee Mukherjee	Nominated	
54th Filmfare Awards South	Best Music Director – Telugu	K. M. Radha Krishnan	Nominated	
54th Filmfare Awards South	Best Lyricist – Telugu	Veturi (for "Uppongene Godavari")	Won	
54th Filmfare Awards South	Best Female Playback Singer – Telugu	K. S. Chitra (for "Manasavacha")	Nominated	
