= Keerthi Reddy =

Indian actress

- Occupation: Actress
- Years active: 1996–2004
- Spouse: Sumanth (m. 2004–2006)
- Children: 2

Keerthi Reddy is an Indian former actress who appeared primarily in Telugu, and Tamil films, in addition to some Hindi and Kannada films. Her notable work includes Tholi Prema (1998), Pyaar Ishq Aur Mohabbat (2001) and Arjun (2004). She has received a Filmfare Award for her performance in the film Arjun (2004).

== Early life ==
Reddy was born to an interior designer and dress designer mother. Her grandfather is Keshpally Ganga Reddy, Ex-Member of Parliament from Nizamabad in Telangana based out of Keshpally village of Jakranpally mandal. She was raised in Bengaluru. She did her schooling in Jiddu Krishnamurthy's The Valley School near Kanakapura, Bengaluru. She was trained in Bharatanatyam for eight years. She briefly studied at St. Joseph's Public School in Hyderabad. She attended Ryerson University for higher education in Toronto, Canada.

== Career ==
In 1996, Keerthi Reddy made her film debut in a comedy thriller Gunshot, opposite Ali directed by S. V. Krishna Reddy. In 1998, Keerthi was cast as the female lead opposite Pawan Kalyan in Tholi Prema which was a blockbuster. In 2000, Keerthi Reddy made her Bollywood debut in Tera Jadoo Chal Gayaa opposite Abhishek Bachchan. Her next film Pyaar Ishq Aur Mohabbat featured her as Isha Nair opposite the debutant Arjun Rampal. Her role was that of a girl who was loved by three men Gaurav Saxena, Yash Sabarwal (Suniel Shetty) and Taj Bharadwaj (Aftab Shivdasani). In 2002, Keerthi did a supporting role in Badhaai Ho Badhaai opposite Anil Kapoor. After these films, she stopped acting in Hindi films.

In 2002, Keerthi Reddy acted in Super Star, her only Kannada film. In 2004 Keerthi Reddy acted in the Telugu film Arjun as Mahesh Babu's sister, a role for which she received the Filmfare Best Supporting Actress Award in Telugu.

== Personal life ==
Keerthi married actor Sumanth, Nagarjuna Akkineni's nephew and the grandson of Akkineni Nageswara Rao, in 2004. They divorced in 2006. She later remarried and now lives in Singapore. The couple has two children.

== Filmography ==
Year	Title	Role	Language	Notes	Ref.
1996	Gunshot	Swarna	Telugu		
1997	Devathai	Devi / Kayal	Tamil		
1997	Nandhini	Raji	Tamil		
1998	Jolly	Chellamma	Tamil		
1998	Iniyavale	Manju	Tamil		
1998	Tholi Prema	Anu	Telugu	Nominated – Filmfare Award for Best Actress – Telugu	
1999	Ninaivirukkum Varai	Sandhya	Tamil		
1999	Preminche Manasu	Shailaja	Telugu		
1999	Ravoyi Chandamama	Rukmini	Telugu		
2000	Tera Jadoo Chal Gayaa	Pooja	Hindi	Nominated – Filmfare Award for Best Female Debut	
2001	Pyaar Ishq Aur Mohabbat	Isha Nair	Hindi		
2002	Badhaai Ho Badhaai	Florence D'Souza	Hindi		
2002	Super Star	Devayani	Kannada	Debut in Kannada	
2004	Arjun	Meenakshi	Telugu	Won – Filmfare Award for Best Supporting Actress – Telugu	

=== Music videos ===
Year	Title	Album	Ref.
2004	Bin Tere Sanam	Sweet Honey Mix	

== See also ==
- List of Indian Actors
- List of Indian film actresses
