= Thalaivettiyaan Paalayam =

- Genre: Comedy drama
- Created by: Deepak Kumar Mishra; Arunabh Kumar
- Based on: Panchayat
- Written by: Balakumaran Murugesan
- Directed by: Naga
- Starring: Abishek Kumar; Chetan; Devadarshini; Niyathi; Anandsami; Paul Raj; Veera Sai Manikandan Thogaru
- Country of origin: India
- Original language: Tamil
- No. of seasons: 1
- No. of episodes: 8

Production
- Executive producers: Vijay Koshy; Shreyansh Pandey
- Producer: Arunabh Kumar
- Production location: Tamil Nadu
- Camera setup: Multi-camera
- Running time: approx.26–34 minutes per episode
- Production company: A TVF Creation

Original release
- Network: Amazon Prime Video
- Release: 20 September 2024

Related
- Panchayat

Thalaivettiyaan Paalayam is a 2024 Indian Tamil-language comedy drama television series, which is an official remake of the Hindi-language series Panchayat. The series is written by Balakumaran Murugesan and directed by Naga for Amazon Prime Video. Produced by Arunabh Kumar under the banner of TVF, the show revolves around a young boy (Siddharth) from Chennai, who is challenged of his new and unfamiliar surroundings in the remote village of Thalaivettiyaan Paalayam.

The principal actors of the series are Abishek Kumar, Chetan, Devadarshini, Niyathi, Anandsami, Paul Raj and Veera Sai Manikandan Thogaru. The series premiered on 20 September 2024 on Amazon Prime Video and consists of eight episodes.

== Cast ==
=== Main ===
- Abishek Kumar as Siddharth; secretary of Gram Panchayat
- Chethan as Meenakshi Sundaram; chairman's husband
- Devadharshini as Meenakshi Devi; chairman
- Anandsami as Prabhu
- Paul Raj as Lakshmipathi
- Veera Sai Manikandan Thogaru as Vigensh
- Niyati Kadambi as Soundarya; daughter of Meenakshi Sundaram and Meenakshi Devi

=== Recurring ===
- Uvan Swang as Muruganantham (Episodes: 3–4,8)
- Muralidaran as Groom (Episode: 3)
- Regin Rose as Isakki (Episode: 4)
- Eswar Moorthy as VAO (Episode: 4)
- Sathyamoorthy as Chinnarasu Thatha (Episode: 4)
- Pradeep Ravichandar as Mathayian (Episode: 7)
- Keerthi Pradeep as Mathayian's Wife (Episode: 7)
- Shylaja Chetlur as District magistrate (Episode: 8)

== Episodes ==
=== Season 1 (2024) ===
No.	Title	Directed by	Written by	Original release date
1	"Secretary Saar!"	Naga	Bala Kumaran	20 September 2024
2	"Marathula pei irukkam la?"	Naga	Bala Kumaran	20 September 2024
3	"Oru Narkali ka itna sandai?"	Naga	Bala Kumaran	20 September 2024
4	"Poopunitha neerattu vizha!"	Naga	Bala Kumaran	20 September 2024
5	"Kudi Monitorayum kedukkum"	Naga	Bala Kumaran	20 September 2024
6	"Inimey pechukku idam illa"	Naga	Bala Kumaran	20 September 2024
7	"Rendula onnu"	Naga	Bala Kumaran	20 September 2024
8	"Sound Amma"	Naga	Bala Kumaran	20 September 2024

== Development ==
=== Production ===
The series is produced by Arunabh Kumar under the banner of A TVF Creation, the same company that produced the Hindi version. Naga directed the series.

=== Casting ===
Actor Abishek Kumar was cast main role as Siddharth. This is his a main lead role. Chetan and Devadarshini were cast as Meenakshi Sundaram and Meenakshi Devi. Shylaja Chetlur was cast in episode 8 as District magistrate. Chetan, Devadarshini and Shylaja Chetlur havre worked on Naga’s series Marmadesam (1996–1997), Ramany vs Ramany (2001), Rudraveena (2004 and Chidambara Rahasiyam (2006).

=== Release ===
The series trailer was released on 13 September 2024.
