= Anandhapurathu Veedu =

- Directed by: Naga
- Written by: Sharath A. Haridaasan; Indra Soundar Rajan; Naga
- Produced by: S. Shankar
- Starring: Nandha; Chaya Singh; Aryan
- Cinematography: Arunmani Palani
- Edited by: Kishore Te
- Music by: Ramesh Krishna
- Production company: S Pictures
- Release date: 9 July 2010
- Country: India
- Language: Tamil

Anandhapurathu Veedu (transl. The Anandhapuram House/ The Utopian House) is a 2010 Indian Tamil-language supernatural mystery film co written and directed by Tamil television director Naga, who has directed serials like Marmadesam, Vidathu Karuppu and Chidambara Rahasiyam. This film, Naga's feature film debut, stars Nandha and Chaya Singh in lead roles along with child artist Aryan, making his debut. Written by Naga, Sharath Haridasan and Indra Soundar Rajan and produced by director S. Shankar's S Pictures, Anandhapurathu Veedu was released on 9 July 2010 to positive reviews.

== Plot ==
15 years after an accident in which Bala's parents died, Bala returns with his wife Revathi and son Anand to his hometown. They decide to stay a couple of nights in the massive house in which he grew up. As he spends a few days in the house and recalls his memories, Anand, who has a disability to speak, sees supernatural movements around the house but could not tell anyone what he witnesses. Soon, Revathi, who suffers from claustrophobia, deduces poltergeist activity in the house, and so, she tells Bala that they have to go back to Chennai. Anand enjoys the presence of the ghosts and does not find any problem. Problems come up between the couple that they had never thought of when they got into their love marriage. Soon, Revathi discovers that they did not come on holiday, but in fact, came to escape some rowdies that Bala owes money to. This is when Bala's classmate and business partner Jeeva arrives to stay with them. His company had borrowed 40 lakhs from a rowdy, and over the months, it had increased to 50 lakhs, but he is unable to pay back any money as his agent, who was supposed to give him two crores, runs away and is nowhere to be found. With the help of ghosts, Bala and his family find a way to escape from being kept under house arrest. Then it knows that Bala's partner, who has been jealous of him, had the money the whole time to pay the rowdies without Bala's family knowing it. How will Bala's deceased parents saves him from the problem is the rest of the story.

== Cast ==
- Nandha as Balasubramaniyam
- Chaya Singh as Revathi Balasubramaniyam
- Aryan as Ananth Subramaniyam
- Krishna as Jeeva
- Lavanya as Radhika
- Kalairani as Mayilamma
- Y. G. Mahendra as Bala's father's friend
- Megh Varn Pant as Sasikanth
- Ganesh Babu as Rathnam
- Samson T. Willson as Natwarlal

== Production ==
Meera Jasmine was originally chosen as lead actress but later got replaced by Chaya Singh.

== Soundtrack ==
The Soundtrack was composed by Ramesh Krishnan.

- Thaaye Enge
- Chithrai Vaanam

== See also ==
- Things Heard & Seen

== Critical reception ==
Sify wrote "The trouble with popular television serial director Naga's debut film Ananthapurathu Veedu is that it just does not live up to the promise. It has been promoted as a supernatural thriller by its makers and ends up as a tame family run-of-the-mill movie." Behindwoods wrote, "Although AV has a couple of pluses to its credit, it lacks in pace and there is an uneven keel to it. The narration does not engage the audience which is much needed for a film like this. AV does not scare you at all and is right for people wanting a relaxed family fare." The New Indian Express wrote, "Labelled as a supernatural thriller with a comic touch, the film however neither generates fear nor laughter. In fact, it leaves you with no feelings at all. It has quite a few subplots with characters entering, leaves you with a narration that is bland and juvenile at places."
