= Shylaja Chetlur =

Indian television, film and theatre actress

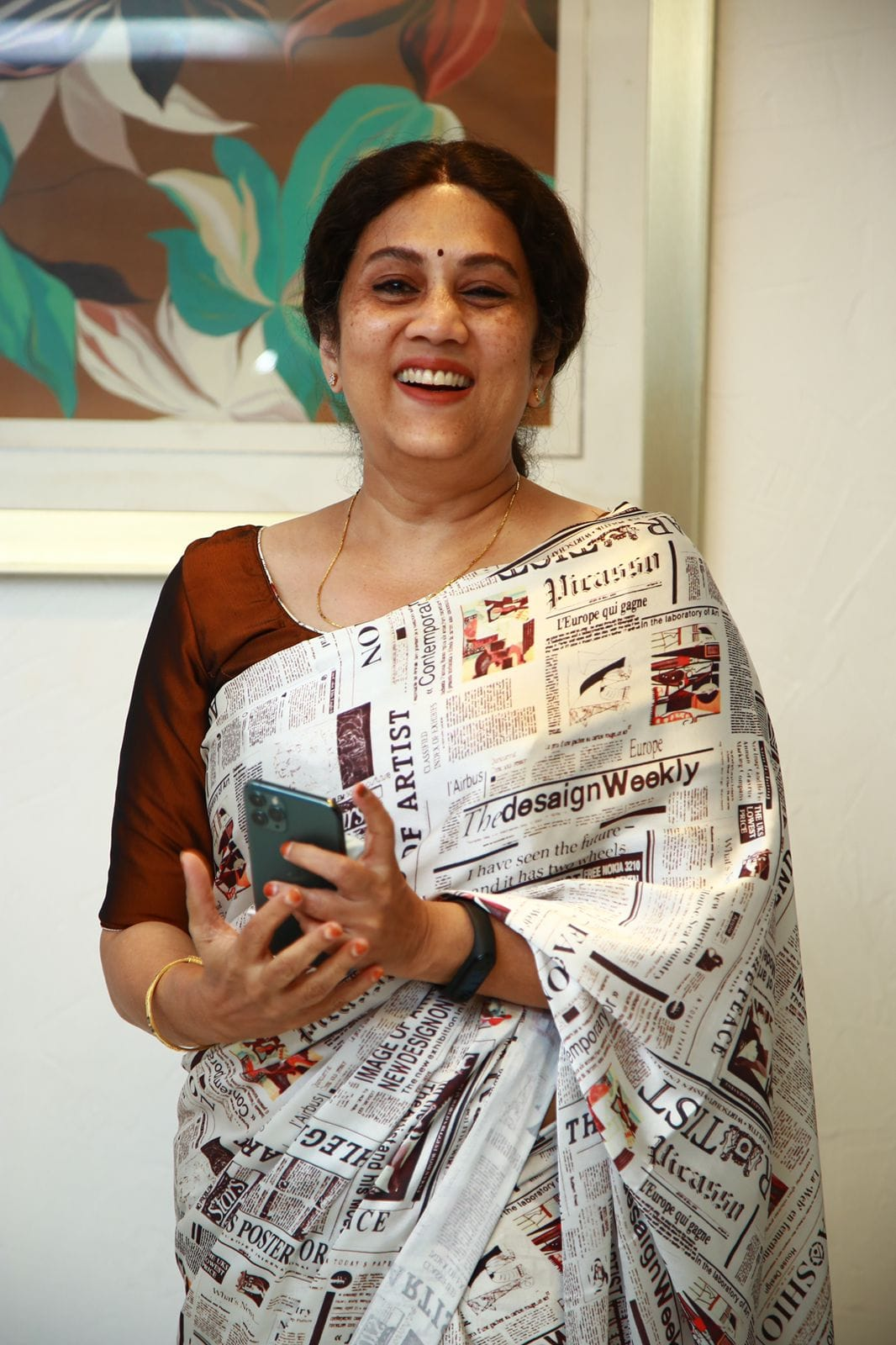
- Occupations: Actress; Director; Producer; Entrepreneur

Shylaja Chetlur is an Indian television, films & theatre actress and an entrepreneur.

== Television ==
Year	Title	Channel
1999	Master Mayavi	Sun TV (India)
1999	Sarthagam	Asianet (TV channel)
1999	Oonjal	Star Vijay
2000	Guesthouse	DD Podhigai
2001	Marmadesam – Edhuvum Nadakkum	Raj TV
2002–2004	Rudhra Veenai	Sun TV (India)
2002–2006	Cinema Karam Coffee	Star Vijay
2006–2008	Kana Kaanum Kaalangal	Star Vijay
2003	Sahana	Jaya TV
2007	Lakshmi	Sun TV (India)
2009	Vasantham	Sun TV (India)
2009	Arase	Sun TV (India)

== Movies ==
Year	Title
2010	Enthiran
2017	Ticket (2017 film)
2021	Ainthu Unarvugal

== Web Series ==
Year	Title	Channel
2018	What's Up Velakkari	ZEE5
2024	Thalaivettiyaan Paalayam	Amazon Prime Video

== In Direction Department ==
Year	Title	Role
2002-04	Indira (Sun TV Serial)	Associate Director
2004-07	Maya Machindra (Vijay TV Serial)	Associate Director
2009	Janaki (Malayalam movie)	Assistant Director
2024	Aindham Vedham	Associate Director

== Other works ==
She is the Founder & Managing Trustee of the not-for-profit Cinema Rendezvous Trust showcasing & discussing World Cinemas of substance to promote cross-cultural understanding. The trust's objective is to create awareness about Cinema as a social tool. It had instituted the Bala Kailasam Memorial Award (BKMA) since 2015, an annual recognition with a cash prize, for national level excellence in documentary filmmaking having a social impact.

Shylaar Production is her production house that produces corporate films, documentaries and Public Service Announcement films. She co-promoted a contemporary art gallery – Art & Soul promoting visual artists, holding several exhibitions from 2010 to 2013. Wanderlust, the travel lounge she operates in Hotel Savera, is involved in conducting heritage & temple tours.

She is a regular speaker & moderator on talks about women affairs, entertainment & entrepreneurship. She was an executive committee member of the Chennai International Film Festival She is also a member of Andhra Chamber of Commerce, South Indian film Chamber of Commerce, The Duchess Club & Hindustan chamber of commerce. .
