= Krishnadasi =

Krishnadasi may refer to:

- Krishnadasi (2000 TV series), an Indian Tamil-language soap opera
- Krishnadasi (2016 TV series), an Indian television series
