= Lakshmi (2006 TV series) =

- Genre: Soap opera
- Written by: Devi Bala; Dialogues by Bhaskar Shakthi; Ve.Ki.Amirthraj
- Screenplay by: Home Media
- Directed by: Sundar. K. Vijayan (1-187); R. Balaji Yadav M.A (188-500)
- Creative director: Sujatha Vijaykumar
- Starring: Meena; Vijay Adhiraj; Lakshmi Gopalaswamy; Chetan; Saakshi Siva; Devadarshini; Mohan Sharma; Tinku
- Theme music composer: Ramkiran Dhina (title song); Kiran (background score)
- Opening theme: "Azhagukku Oru Azhagu"; Binny Krishnakumar (vocal); Pa. Vijay (lyrics)
- Country of origin: India
- Original language: Tamil
- No. of episodes: 500

Production
- Producer: Sujatha vijaya Kumar
- Cinematography: Hemashankar; Shrinivas
- Editor: D.Prem Kumar
- Camera setup: Multi-camera
- Running time: 20–22 minutes
- Production company: Home Media

Original release
- Network: Sun TV
- Release: 24 July 2006 – 13 June 2008

Lakshmi is a 2006–2008 Indian Tamil-language soap opera that aired on Sun TV from 24 July 2006 to 24 November 2006 and 27 November 2006 to 13 June 2008 for 500 episodes.

The show starred Meena, Vijay Adhiraj, Lakshmi Gopalaswamy, Mohan Sharma, Chetan, Saakshi Siva It was produced by Home Media, director by Sundar. K. Vijayan and R. Balaji yadav.

== Plot ==
Focusing on caste-discrimination in India, this is the story of a Brahmin Intelligence girl (Meena) who falls in love with a boy (Vijay Adhiraj) from the so-called lower caste.

== Cast ==
=== Main ===
- Meena as Lakshmi
- Vijay Adhiraj
- Lakshmi Gopalaswamy as Nethra

=== Recurring ===
- Mohan Sharma
- Malaysia Vasudevan
- Chetan
- Saakshi Siva
- Akash as Santhosh
- Santhana Bharathi
- Reena
- Manokar as ACP Poobalan
- Shylaja Chetlur
- Nikita Aria / Ramya Shankar
- Vinayak as Madhu
- K.S. Jeyalakshmi
- Pollachi Babu
- Fathima Babu
- Preethi Sanjeev
- Rani
- Akila
- Kanya Bharathi
- Tinku
- Rajasekar
- Gowthami Vembunathan
- Amarasigamani
- Pasi Sathya
- Srilekha Rajendran
- Rajendran
- Archana Suresh
- Ravi Varma
- T.S.Ragavendhar
- Vizhuthugal Santhanam
- Joker Thulasi

== Soundtrack ==
=== Title song ===
It was written by P. Vijay. It was sung by Binni Krishnakumar.

=== Soundtrack ===
Track listing
No.	Title	Lyrics	Singer(s)	Length
1.	"Seetha Kalyana Vaipokame (சீதா கல்யாண வைபோகமே)"	P. Vijay	Binni Krishnakumar	3:40
