= Athipookal =

Indian Tamil-language soap opera

- Genre: Soap opera Family
- Written by: Indra Soundar Rajan
- Screenplay by: Indra Soundar Rajan
- Directed by: K. Shanmugam (1-750); R. P. Marudhu (751-980); K. Shiva (981-1272)
- Creative director: K. Shanmugam
- Starring: Devadarshini; Chetan; Sandhya Jagarlamudi; Rani
- Theme music composer: X Paulraj
- Opening theme: "Aariraro Uravugalae"; Saindhavi (Vocals); Dr.Krithaya (Lyrics)
- Country of origin: India
- Original language: Tamil
- No. of seasons: 4
- No. of episodes: 1,272

Production
- Producer: B. R. Vijayalakshmi
- Cinematography: K. S. Udhayashankar
- Editors: M. Velumurugan; Palanisamy; Muralikrishnan
- Camera setup: Multi-camera
- Running time: approx. 20-22 minutes
- Production company: Saregama

Original release
- Network: Sun TV
- Release: 3 December 2007 – 14 December 2012

Athipookal (transl. Fig flowers) was an Indian Tamil-language soap opera that aired during weekdays on Sun TV from 3 December 2007 to 14 December 2012 for 1272 episodes. The show starred Devadarshini, Chetan, Sandhya Jagarlamudi, Venkat, Raani, Vietnam Veedu Sundaram, Thilakshi, T. S. Raghavendar, Premi and V.R. Thilakam. It was produced by Saregama and directed by K. Shanmugam, R.P Marudhu and K.Shiva. It is one of the most well known serials that aired on Sun TV in the afternoon slot. It received high praise and was a hit for the channel. The show was retelecasted at the same channel from March 1, 2021 to March 25, 2022 at 10:30 am. The show was retelecasted at the same channel from May 30, 2026 at 9:30 AM

== Synopsis ==
The show story revolves around Padma (Devadarshini), Manohar (Chetan/Sathish) and Karpagam (Sandhya Jagarlamudi). Manohar and Padma are a happy couple, but even after many years of marriage, they are unable to have a child. Padma's sister in law Anjali (Rani) is jealous of Padma's wealth and covertly slips in medicines in Padma's food to make her infertile. Karpagam bears Manokar's child as a surrogate mother. The baby boy is born and named Shiva. Padma does not know Karpagam is the surrogate mother however Anjali finds out. Things turn bitter when Manokar and Karpagam are falsely accused of having an illegal relationship, and Padma wholeheartedly believes her sister in law and gets angry at Manohar. The subsequent evil schemes Anjali comes up with to separate Padma and Manohar form the crux of the show.

== Cast ==
=== Main cast ===
- Devadarshini as Padma
- Yashvath (baby actor) as Shiva / Padma son
- Chetan / Satheesh Kumar as Mano alias Manokar
- Sandhya Jagarlamudi as Karpagam
- Rani as Anjali, Padma's sister-in-law,

=== Recurring cast ===
- Initha as Maha (Anjali's assistant)
- Sukiran as Dhakshinamoorthy (Karpagam's brother)
- Oorvambu Lakshmi as Mangaa (Karpagam's sister-in-law)
- Usha as Mangaa's mother
- Super Good Kannan as Shekhar, Padma's elder brother, Anjali's husband and Vijay's father
- Vietnam Veedu Sundaram as Krishnaswamy (Mano's uncle)
- Venkat as Senthil Kumaran, Karpagam's interest
- Gemini Rajeshwari as Nagamma
- Sumangali
- K. S. Jayalakshmi
- V.R. Thilakam as Padma and Sekar's mother
- Sangeetha Balan as Saroja
- J. Lalitha as Renuka's mother
- Deepa Narendraan / Neelima Rani as Renukha
- T. S. Raghavendar
- Premi
- Kannan as Dilakam
- Dubbing Janaki - Karpagam, Eshwari and Dakshinamoorthy's mother
- Pooja Lokesh as Eshwari, Karpagam's sister
- Dr. Sharmila as Dr. Jhansi
- Sivakavitha as Senthil's sister
- Ceylon Manohar
- Jashak
- Jangiri Madhumitha as Bhanu
- Devipriya as Regina Victor
- Abijeeth as Vijay

== Original soundtrack ==
The title song was composed by X.Paulraj and was sung by famous singer Saindhavi with lyrics written by Dr.Kiruthiya.

Tracklist
No.	Title	Lyrics	Singer(s)	Length
1.	"Ari Aro Uravugale ஆரி ஆரோ உறவுகளே"	Dr.Kiruthiya	Saindhavi	3:00

== Remake ==
- The series has been remade in the Kannada Language as Jo Jo Laali and was broadcast on Udaya TV from 10 April 2017 to 14 June 2019.
