= Devadarshini =

Indian actress

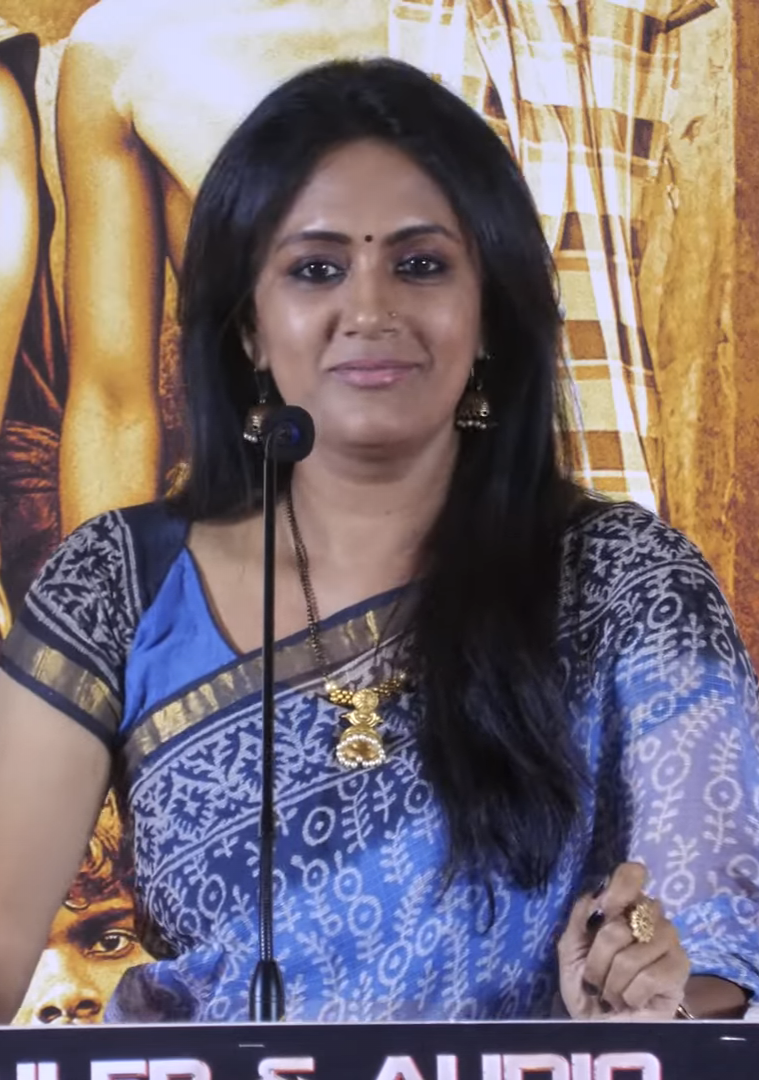
- Devadarshini in 2025
- Born: Devadarshini Sukumaran; Chennai, Tamil Nadu, India
- Occupation: Actress
- Years active: 1997–present
- Spouse: Chetan
- Children: 1
- Honours: Kalaimamani Award (2019)

Devadarshini Sukumaran is an Indian actress who predominantly appears in Tamil films, in addition to few Telugu, Malayalam, Hindi films and television series. She began her career as a television anchor and entered cinema playing supporting and comedic roles. She is a recipient of three Tamil Nadu State Film Awards. She has performed in television serials including Marmadesam and Athipookal.

== Career ==
While still in college, she began anchoring television shows. She was then offered an opportunity to act in the Doordarshan serial Kanavugal Ilavasam, which led to her landing a role in the mystery series Marmadesam by Naga. She was introduced in Ramany vs Ramany Part 02, which was also directed by Naga. Devadarshini became part of the series' second installment, Vidathu Karuppu, which she considers a "big turning point" in her life as it established her in the industry.

She won her the Tamil Nadu State Film Award for Best Comedian for Parthiban Kanavu (2003). She played the lead role in Sakthi Pirakuthu (2010), a film made by an NGO. She is still on the small screen with Athipookal and Idhayam.

Pointing out the difference between films and serials, she says, “Our performance would be lauded in films despite a poor performance by the co-star, whereas the entire scene would be criticised in such a scenario in serials as timing is more important on the small screen.

After Muni 2: Kanchana (2011), she was continuously doing humorous characters. In 2015, she won the Tamil Nadu State Film Award for Best Comedian for 36 Vayadhinile and Thiruttu Kalyanam. She received a lot of recognition and positive feedback for her role in '96 (2018).

In the series, The Family Man (Season 2), Devadarshini played a Tamil-speaking police officer based in Chennai. Her performance received positive responses from critics following the show’s release.

== Personal life ==
Devadarshini was born in Chennai to a Telugu-speaking family. She studied commerce in college and later gained a master's degree in Applied Psychology.

In 2002, Devadarshini married Chetan, a television actor. They first worked together on Marmadesam - Vidathu Karuppu, and then went on to act several projects together like Athipookal. Her daughter, Niyati Kadambi, made her debut in 96 portraying the younger version of her mother's character.

== Awards and nominations ==
Year	Award	Category	Film	Result	Ref.
2003	Tamil Nadu State Film Awards	Tamil Nadu State Film Award for Best Comedian	Parthiban Kanavu	Won	
2011	Tamil Nadu State Film Awards	Tamil Nadu State Film Award for Best Comedian	Muni 2: Kanchana	Won	
2011	Norway Tamil Film Festival Awards	Norway Tamil Film Festival Award for Best Supporting Actress	Mahaan Kanakku	Won	
2015	Tamil Nadu State Film Awards	Tamil Nadu State Film Award for Best Comedian	36 Vayadhinile, Thiruttu Kalyanam	Won	
2018	Tamil Nadu State Film Awards	Tamil Nadu State Film Award for Best Comedian	'96	Won	

=== Honours ===
- Kalaimamani Award - 2019

== Filmography ==
=== Tamil films ===
Key
†	Denotes films that have not yet been released

Year	Title	Role	Notes
2003	Parthiban Kanavu	Amudha	Tamil Nadu State Film Award for Best Comedian
2003	Kaakha Kaakha	Swathi Srikanth	
2003	Enakku 20 Unakku 18	Sridhar's sister	
2003	Kadhal Kirukkan	Psychiatrist	
2004	Azhagiya Theeye	Sandhya	
2005	Gurudeva	Deva's friend	
2005	6'2	Meenakshi	
2005	Ponniyin Selvan	Venu's sister	
2005	Mazhai	Arjun's sister	
2005	Kanda Naal Mudhal	Krishna's sister	
2006	Saravana	Saravana's sister-in-law	
2006	Rendu	Madhavan's sister	
2007	Deepavali	Sumathi	
2007	Kireedam		
2007	Manase Mounama	Gowri	
2007	Vel	Sarala	
2007	Evano Oruvan	Vetri Maran's wife	
2007	Puli Varudhu	Sudha	Special appearance
2008	Pirivom Santhippom	Natesan's sister-in-law	
2008	Saroja	Herself	Guest appearance
2009	Padikathavan	Kousalya Gowtham	
2009	Pudhiya Payanam	Devi	
2009	Solla Solla Inikkum	Bhadri Narayanan's wife	
2010	Kola Kolaya Mundhirika	Jamindar's wife	
2010	Enthiran	Latha	
2010	Kanagavel Kaaka	Kanagavel's sister	
2010	Shakti Pirakkudhu		
2011	Muni 2: Kanchana	Kamakshi	Tamil Nadu State Film Award for Best Comedian
2011	Mahaan Kanakku	Janaki	Norway Tamil Film Festival Award for Best Supporting Actress
2011	Yuvan Yuvathi	Nisha's sister	
2012	Saguni	Sathyamoorthy's daughter	
2012	Naan Ee	Bindhu's sister-in-law	
2013	Kanna Laddu Thinna Aasaiya	Maami (Neighbour)	
2013	Karuppampatti	Sivagami	
2013	Theeya Velai Seiyyanum Kumaru	Kumar's sister	
2013	Thillu Mullu 2	Bank Officer	
2013	Ya Ya	Aishwarya	
2013	Kolagalam	Ramya's sister-in-law	
2013	Naveena Saraswathi Sabatham	Parvati	
2014	Veeram	District Collector Subbu's wife	
2014	Tenaliraman	Eating Joint Owner's Sister	
2014	Irumbu Kuthirai	Mary Narayanan	
2014	Murugaatrupadai		
2014	Amma Ammamma		
2014	Vaanga Pazhagalam	Alwarpet Anjalai	Singaporean television film
2014	Vingyani		
2014	Azhagiya Pandipuram		
2015	36 Vayadhinile	Girija	Tamil Nadu State Film Award for Best Comedian; Nominated, Filmfare Award for Best Supporting Actress – Tamil
2015	Aavi Kumar	Patient's wife	
2015	Kadhal Agadhi		
2015	Thiruttu VCD		
2015	Thiraipada Nagaram		
2015	Pallikoodam Pogamale	Vijay's mother	
2016	Saagasam	Lalitha	
2016	Vaaliba Raja	Devadarshini	
2016	Nambiar	Ramachandran's sister in law	
2016	Achamindri	Chellam	
2017	Motta Shiva Ketta Shiva	Banu	
2017	Sangili Bungili Kadhava Thorae	Swetha's mother	
2017	7 Naatkal	Gautham's sister	
2017	Mersal	Nurse	
2018	Titanic Kadhalum Kavundhu Pogum	Unknown	Unreleased
2018	Bhaagamathie	Kanchana	
2018	Semma Botha Aagathey	Devi	
2018	Itly	Sub-Inspector	
2018	Roja Maaligai		
2018	96	Subhashini	Tamil Nadu State Film Award for Best Comedian
2018	Johnny	Prema	
2019	90ML	Doctor	
2019	Muni 4: Kanchana 3	Kamakshi	
2019	Ayogya	Sindhu's mother	
2019	Thiruttu Kalyanam		Tamil Nadu State Film Award for Best Comedian
2019	Gurkha	Gayathri	
2019	Jackpot	Rahul's mother	
2019	Bigil	Elizabeth	
2019	Market Raja MBBS	Kalavathy	
2019	Capmaari	Priya	
2019	Thirupathi Samy Kudumbam		
2021	Calls	Sangeetha	
2021	Annabelle Sethupathi	Kumari	
2021	Thanne Vandi		
2022	Etharkkum Thunindhavan	Anjumani	
2022	The Legend	Thirupathi's wife	
2023	Bakasuran	Inspector Radhika	
2023	Ghosty		
2023	Theerkadarishi	Hema	
2024	Yaavarum Vallavare	Athaachi	
2024	Udhir @ Poomara Kathu		
2024	PT Sir	Eswari	
2024	Raayan	Doctor	
2024	Raghu Thatha	Alamelu	
2024	Lubber Pandhu	Vijaya	
2024	Meiyazhagan	Hema Arul	
2025	Badava	Selvi	
2025	Phoenix		
2025	Bun Butter Jam	Uma	
2026	Lucky the Superstar	Anu	
2026	Youth	Saroja Unnikrishnan	
2026	Once More	Lavanya	
2026	Sardar 2	Doctor Sam	
2026	Drones		

=== Other language films ===
Year	Title	Role	Language	Notes
2003	Nee Manasu Naaku Telusu	Girija	Telugu	Bilingual film
2004	Love Today	Dharma's wife	Telugu	
2006	Amma Cheppindi	Saraswati's neighbor	Telugu	
2012	Eega	Bindhu's sister-in-law	Telugu	Bilingual film
2016	Sarrainodu	Gana's aunt	Telugu	
2018	Bhaagamathie	Kanchana	Telugu	Bilingual film
2018	Awe	Parvati	Telugu	
2018	Krishnarjuna Yudham	Dhinchak Roja	Telugu	
2019	Manmadhudu 2	Sangeetha	Telugu	
2021	Tuck Jagadish	Ganga Bhavani	Telugu	
2022	Shabaash Mithu	Leela Raj	Hindi	
2023	The Kerala Story	Shalini's mother	Hindi	
2025	Am Ah	Ammini Amma	Malayalam	
2025	Thalavara	Asha	Malayalam	

=== Dubbing artist ===
Year	Title	Actor	Role
2004	Kanavu Meippada Vendum	Lakshmi Gopalaswamy	

== Television ==
Year	Title	Role	Channel	Language	Notes
1997	Kanavugal Ilavasam			Tamil	
1997–1998	Vidathu Karuppu	Reena	Sun TV	Tamil	
1997	Ethanai Manidhargal		DD Podhigai	Tamil	
1998	Nimmathi Ungal Choice II			Tamil	
2000–2001	Ramany vs Ramany II	Ramany	Raj TV	Tamil	
2000–2001	Edhuvum Nadakkum	Varsha	Raj TV	Tamil	
2002	Parvathy	Parvathy	Surya TV	Malayalam	
2002–2005	Annamalai	Valliammai	Sun TV	Tamil	
2004–2006	Chidambara Rahasiyam	Thulasi	Sun TV	Tamil	
2004–2005	Kolangal	Sujatha	Sun TV	Tamil	
2004–2006	Chinna Papa Periya Papa Season 2	Periya Papa	Sun TV	Tamil	
	Penmanam		Sun TV	Tamil	
	Uravugal Oru Thodarkadhai		DD Podhigai	Tamil	
	Kannadi Kathavugal		Vijay TV	Tamil	
2005–2006	Adhu Mattum Ragasiyam		Sun TV	Tamil	
2006–2008	Anjali		Sun TV	Tamil	
2006–2008	Lakshmi		Sun TV	Tamil	
2006–2008	Ammayi Kapuram	Padmavati	Gemini TV	Telugu	
2006	Jodi Number One	Contestant	Vijay TV	Tamil	Reality show
2007–2012	Athipookal	Padma Manohar	Sun TV	Tamil	
2008	Paadhaigal		DD Podhigai	Tamil	
2009–2012	Idhyam	Jeya	Sun TV	Tamil	
2009–2011	Sollathan Ninaikkiren	Vidhya Shankar	Zee Tamil	Tamil	
2010	Poovilangu		Star Vijay	Tamil	
2013–2014	Sunday Galatta	Host	Sun TV	Tamil	Comedy show
2018	Genes	Host	Zee Tamil	Tamil	Game show
2018	Comedy Khiladis	Judge	Zee Tamil, Star Vijay	Tamil	Reality show
2019	Mr. and Mrs. Chinnathirai 1	Judge	Zee Tamil, Star Vijay	Tamil	Reality show
2020	Mr. and Mrs. Chinnathirai 2	Judge	Zee Tamil, Star Vijay	Tamil	Reality show
2021	Amman	Judge	Zee Tamil, Star Vijay	Tamil	Reality show
2021	Mr. and Mrs. Chinnathirai 3	Judge	Star Vijay	Tamil	Reality show
2021	The Family Man	S I Umayaal	Amazon Prime Video	Hindi	
2022	Mr. and Mrs. Chinnathirai 4	Judge	Star Vijay	Tamil	Reality show
2024	Thalaivettiyaan Paalayam	Meenakshi Devi	Prime Video	Tamil	
2024	Aindham Vedham	Advocate Ketaki	ZEE5	Tamil	
