= Annabelle Sethupathi =

2021 film by Deepak Sundarrajan

- Official release poster
- Directed by: Deepak Sundarrajan
- Written by: Deepak Sundarrajan
- Produced by: Sudhan Sundaram; G Jayaram
- Starring: Vijay Sethupathi; Taapsee Pannu
- Cinematography: Goutham George
- Edited by: Pradeep E. Ragav
- Music by: Krishna Kishor
- Production company: Passion Studios
- Distributed by: Disney+ Hotstar
- Release date: 17 September 2021
- Running time: 135 minutes
- Country: India
- Language: Tamil

Annabelle Sethupathi is a 2021 Indian Tamil-language horror comedy film directed by Deepak Sundarrajan in his debut and produced by Sudhan Sundaram and G Jayaram under the banner of Passion Studios. The film stars Vijay Sethupathi and Taapsee Pannu in dual roles alongside Jagapathi Babu and Yogi Babu. The film was released worldwide on Disney+ Hotstar on 17 September 2021.

== Plot ==
In 1948, Kadhiresan visited a magnificent palace built by King Veera Sethupathi and wished to own such a palace himself. In 1966, while cooking for her husband and daughter, Kadhiresan's niece gets possessed. Afterward, the family dies in their sleep and reunites with other family members who died in the palace. With them is Kadhiresan's dead cook, Shanmugam, who claims that a mysterious force compels him to poison the inhabitants of the palace every full moon and that a person who survives the poisoning will set them free. Until then, the spirits, including Kadhiresan (who has become a recluse), are trapped in the palace.

In 2021, Rudra's family is a thief feuding with two other thieves. The dispute lands them in front of police Inspector Kadhir, the great-great-grandson of Kadhiresan. Kadhir and his grandfather, Vikram, wish to sell the palace but are stymied by rumors of its haunting. Kadhir supposedly hires Rudra's family to clean the palace. He wants them to live there until the full moon to prove that the palace is safe. Rudra's family agrees to clean the property, planning to loot the palace.

Suddenly, the ghosts feel mysterious energy and hope she can set them free when Rudra takes her first step. She enchants the palace and plots with her family to fake a haunting so they can acquire the palace cheaply. Kadhiresan's ghost, spooked after seeing Rudra, secretly follows her around. On the day of the full moon, Rudra's family goes to the temple, leaving Rudra behind. Shanmugam possesses Rudra's mother to cook for her. Rudra eats and falls asleep. Though she survives, she can see the ghosts when she wakes up. After hearing their story, Rudra promises to free them in return for them helping with her plan.

Shanmugam later takes Rudra to a secret room in the palace, which holds pictures from the 1940s of a woman resembling her. Shanmugam tells Rudra the story of Veera Sethupathi, who built the castle for his beloved queen, Annabelle. The two live happily, but Kadhiresan begins to covet their home. After Veera Sethupathi refuses to sell the palace, Kadhiresan poisons the couple. A pregnant Annabelle dies after swearing vengeance, which is secretly spotted by the couple's cook, Shanmugam. After Kadhiresan and his extended family move into the palace, Shanmugam poisons their food. Kadhiresan suspects Shanmugam and forces him to eat first, which Shanmugam does without hesitation. By the following day, Shanmugam, Kadhiresan, and his family were all dead, except for Kadhiresan's grandson, Vikram, who had missed the meal. Since then, Shanmugam has been killing Kadhiresan's relatives who move into the palace. The only survivors of the family are Vikram and Kadhir.

Thus, Kadhir attempts to kick Rudra's family out of the palace when a mysterious force throws Kadhir and his goons out, surprising the ghosts who couldn't interfere. Shanmugam fails to convince Rudra that she is the reincarnation of Annabelle. The ghosts overhear their conversation and are angry at Shanmugam's deceit. Kadhir and his goons return with Vikram, who believes that Rudra is Annabelle. He decides to kill her to satisfy his grandfather's ghost. The ghosts of Kadhiresan's family acknowledge Rudra as the rightful owner of the palace and combine their powers to stop Vikram from hurting her. When a new arrival enters the palace, they again feel the energy accompanying Rudra's arrival and, finally, at peace, disappear.

The new arrival, a government official resembling Veera Sethupathi, tells the assembled parties that the government will seize the palace as a heritage-listed tourism site. Rudra and her family depart in a huff. Having fallen in love with Rudra at first sight, the official proposes to her. Rudra accepts with a smile. Shanmugam, watching their reunion, is finally at peace and disappears. Alone in the palace, Kadhiresan's ghost attempts to leave but is shocked that he is still trapped.

== Cast ==
- Vijay Sethupathi in dual roles as
  - King Veera Sethupathi
  - Soora Sethupathi, The government official
- Taapsee Pannu in dual roles as
  - Annabelle Sethupathi
  - Rudra (Voice over by Deepa Venkat)
- Jagapathi Babu as Zamindar Kadhiresan
- Rajendra Prasad as Sivabalan
- Radhika Sarathkumar as Aryamala
- Sunil Reddy as Rudra's brother
- Yogi Babu as Shanmugam
- Vennela Kishore as Christian train passenger
- Subbu Panchu as Sundar Raman
- Suresh Chandra Menon as Vikram
- Linga as Kathir
- Harshadaa Vijay as Geetha
- George Maryan as Bhaktavatsalam
- Rajkumar as Train passenger
- Jangiri Madhumitha as Thendral
- Chetan as Sundhar Pandiyan
- Devadarshini as Kumari
- Surekha Vani as Raghavi

== Production ==
Deepak Sundarrajan, son of director-actor R. Sundarrajan, who worked under the assistance of A. L. Vijay was reported to make his directorial debut with a film starring Remya Nambeesan and Natty Subramaniam, was announced in June 2017. But the project did not materialise due to various reasons. Three years later, in August 2020, he was reported to direct a horror comedy film, starring Taapsee Pannu and Vijay Sethupathi. It was her third Tamil film she signed after her prior commitments to Bollywood films, she made her return to Tamil cinema with Game Over (2019) and also signed Jana Gana Mana, which went on floors during late-2019. She was reported to play a "street-smart woman", and the film featured an ensemble cast with popular comedians from South Indian cinema acting in pivotal roles. Yogi Babu and Radhika Sarathkumar reported to play pivotal roles in September 2020. Both the characters play dual roles in the film — one being featured in the period portion, and the other in the present timeline.

The film was initially titled as Annabelle Subramaniam and the principal photography began on 28 August 2020 in Jaipur. The film was entirely shot in a single schedule, following COVID-19 restrictions, and had also shot in City Palace, Rambagh Palace and Samode Palace for the past 20 days. It is the first Tamil film to be shot after 50 years, since Adimai Penn (1969), as other production teams found difficult to obtain permission to shoot the films in the palace. The team managed to complete the entire shoot, following the co-operation of the Rajasthan government and the authorities had provided hospitalities for the cast and crew members working in the film. The filmmakers wrapped the shoot within October 2020, and subsequently began post-production with the team had supervised extensive computer graphic works in the film. In August 2021, the makers announced the title changed as Annabelle Sethupathi, for the Tamil version, whilst the Hindi dubbed version was titled Annabelle Rathore.

== Soundtrack ==
Annabelle Sethupathi

Soundtrack album by Krishna Kishor
- Released: 6–10 September 2021
- Recorded: 2021
- Genre: Feature film soundtrack
- Length: 21:54
- Language: Tamil
- Label: Think Music
- Producer: Krishna Kishor

Krishna Kishor chronology
Annabelle Sethupathi (2021)	Mughizh (2021)

The film's soundtrack and score is composed by newcomer Krishna Kishor. Before his debut as film music composer, Kishor worked as a percussionist for leading music composers including A. R. Rahman, Anirudh Ravichander, Hiphop Tamizha and Bollywood musicians. It was his second film he signed before Mughizh, a web-film which also starred and produced by Vijay Sethupathi and his first to be released.

The soundtrack album featured five songs written by Uma Devi, Vivek and Ku. Karthik. Singers Asees Kaur, Sanam Puri and Yashitha Sharma made their Tamil debut in playback singing, by providing vocals to one of the songs. The audio rights were acquired by Think Music. All the songs in the film were released as singles starting from 6 September 2021, with one song being released per day. The full album was unveiled along with the fifth song and two theme tracks in addition on 10 September 2021.

Track listing
No.	Title	Lyrics	Singer(s)	Length
1.	"Vaanil Pogum Megham"	Uma Devi	Armaan Malik, Chinmayi	3:32
2.	"Ghost Party"	Ku. Karthik	Jonita Gandhi, Aaryan Dinesh Kanagaratnam, Yashita Sharma	3:31
3.	"Anange"	Vivek	Pradeep Kumar, Asees Kaur	3:34
4.	"Ginger Soda"	Ku. Karthik	Anirudh Ravichander, Yashita Sharma	3:42
5.	"Anange" (Reprise)	Vivek	Sanam Puri	3:03
6.	"Palace Theme"	–	Instrumental	2:12
7.	"Circle of Fifths"	–	Instrumental	2:12
Total length:				21:54

== Release ==
The film was released on Disney+ Hotstar on 17 September 2021 along with the Hindi dubbed version titled Annabelle Rathore.

== Reception ==
Ranjani Krishnakumar of Firstpost rated the film with 3/5 stars, stating that, "Annabelle Sethupathi could have been a lot more. With a little more complexity in screenplay and some wit in dialogue, the film could have been an absolute feast. Instead, Annabelle Sethupathi settles for being the lukewarm, saccharine tea that you politely drink because the host has made it with love." The Times of India gave a rating of 2.5 out on 5 and wrote, "A comedy with an interesting premise, but flat execution." Manoj Kumar of Indian Express rated the film with 2.5/5 stars, stating that, "Annabelle Sethupathi feels tolerable because of its self-aware nature and the way it subverts horror-comedy tropes." Haricharan Pudipeddi of Hindustan Times wrote, "Annabelle Sethupathi doesn’t try to stand out and there’s no need for it. It’s a film in which the influences are quite evident. It works better as a fantasy comedy and barely as a horror flick." Sudhir Srinivasan of The New Indian Express stated that, "The premise is interesting, but the pain is real." Praveen Sudevan of The Hindu wrote, "Vijay Sethupathi’s performance is the sole saving grace in Deepak Sundarrajan’s supernatural comedy." Bohni Bandyopadhyay of News18 stated that, "Vijay Sethupathi and Taapsee Pannu starrer Annabelle Sethupathi will leave you baffled with its lack in logic and insane scripting." Sowmya Rajendran of The News Minute said, "Annabelle Sethupathi is neither funny nor scary. But the most horrifying fact comes at the end. Apparently, there is a Part 2 planned for this. Oh dear." Janani of India Today rated the film with 1.5/5 stars, and criticised "Many suggested that Annabelle Sethupathi could appeal to kids. But, when you have body-shaming jokes and outdated ideas, even kids won't be able to endure the film."
