= Aindham Vedham =

Tamil web series

- Genre: Mythological thriller
- Created by: Naga
- Directed by: Naga
- Starring: Sai Dhanshika
- Music by: Revaa
- Country of origin: India
- Original language: Tamil
- No. of seasons: 1
- No. of episodes: 8

Production
- Cinematography: Srinivasan Devarajan
- Editor: Rejeesh MR
- Production company: Abirami Media Works

Original release
- Network: ZEE5
- Release: 25 October 2024 – present

Aindham Vedham is a 2024 Indian Tamil-language Sci-fi mythological thriller series directed by Naga (director of Marmadesam, television series). It stars Sai Dhanshika with an ensemble cast includes Santhosh Prathap, Vivek Rajgopal, Y. G. Mahendran, Krisha Kurup, Ramji, Devadarshini, Mathew Varghese, and Ponvannan. The show was released on ZEE5 in both Tamil and dubbed Telugu versions on 25 October 2024.

== Plot ==
The story follows Anu (Sai Dhanshika), a young woman who travels to Varanasi, Uttar Pradesh to perform the last rites of her mother. During her stay, she encounters a mysterious figure who entrusts her with an ancient relic and instructs her to deliver it to a priest in Tamil Nadu. The relic holds the key to unlocking the secrets of the Fifth Veda, a long-lost ancient text. As Anu embarks on this perilous journey, she faces numerous challenges, including malevolent forces determined to stop her. Racing against time, Anu must navigate through dangerous situations to uncover the truth and ensure the relic reaches its destination before the evil forces catch up with her.

== Cast ==
- Sai Dhanshika as Anu Panchamavedhi
  - Adhira Suresh Kumar as Young Anu
- Y. G. Mahendran as Rudarapathy
- Ramji as Pichai, a sage
- Ponvannan as Natarajan
- Santhosh Prathap as Pathi
- Vivek Rajgopal in a dual role as
  - Mithran, a Chennai-based techie
  - AI Shakthi, who takes Mithran's human form.
- Krisha Kurup in a dual role as
  - Radhika, Mithran's love interest
  - AI Radhika, a female version of AI Shakthi who traps Mithran to take his human form.
- Devadarshini as Advocate Ketaki
- Mathew Varghese as Visveshwaran Panchamavedhi, Anu's father
- Gopi Kannadasan as Sambu, Rudrapathy's son and Poorni's father
- Jaden Samuel Mathew as Vikash, Pathi's son
- Sojin K. R as Advocate Sugavanam, Ketaki's stepbrother
- Harris as Mukundan, Kundan's brother
- Prajna Ravi as Annapoorani "Poorni," Sambu's daughter and Rudrapathy's granddaughter
- Ajit Koshy as Dr. Rishi, a scientist
- Shanmugarajan as 'Mad' Suresh, Radhika's father
- Mathi as Kundhavalathone "Kundan", village head
- Nithin Ram as Lullah
- Pari as Julia, Mukundan's girlfriend
- Thirupaachi Benjamin as Dharmakartha
- Muthiah Kannadasan as Krishnamoorthy "Kitty", cab driver
- Harish Ravi as Neelu, a young priest
- Dasarathy as Kailashnath Shastri "Baba"
- Nimesha as Anu's biological mother
- R. Gopinath as Raghu
- S. Illam Bharathi as Jay
- G. Dhayalan as Sam
- U. Sankaran as Aththar
- Indumathy Manikandan as Maragadham, Kundan's wife
- Semmalar Annam as Bhavani
- Esai as Rakesh, Anu's friend
- Shakthi Ramani as Anjali, Pathi's ex-wife and Sashi's wife
- Raaghav as Sashi, Pathi's friend
- Kulanjinathan as an Inspector
- S. Ashok Kumar as Bitto
- Prasanna Rajagopalan as an Archeologist

== Episodes ==
No. overall	No. in season	Title	Directed by
1	1	"The The Box"	L. Nagarajan
2	1	"The Mysterious Destination"	L. Nagarajan
3	1	"The Codex"	L. Nagarajan
4	1	"Bheeja Mantra"	L. Nagarajan
5	1	"Deciphering The Codex"	L. Nagarajan
6	1	"Future Written In The Past"	L. Nagarajan
7	1	"The Riddle"	L. Nagarajan
8	1	"The Fifth Veda"	L. Nagarajan

== Production ==
The show was produced by Abirami Media Works in collaboration with Naga Films and ZEE5 Originals. It was created and directed by L. Nagarajan, who is known for his 1990s thriller Marmadesam. The cinematography was done by Srinivasan Devarajan, editing by Rejeesh MR and the music was composed by Revaa. The makers released the first official motion poster for Aindham Vedham on 3 October 2024. The official teaser was then released on 11 October 2024. The series is scheduled to premiere on ZEE5 on 25 October 2024.

== Reception ==
Thinkal Menon of Times of India gave 3/5 stars and wrote "A slick making style and fast-paced editing pattern would have worked wonders for Aindham Vedham which succeeds only partly in making the viewers connect with its characters on an emotional level." Kirubhakar Purushothaman of News 18 gave 2.5/5 stars and wrote "Instead of being a mythical series that marries myth to science, Aindham Vedham ends up being a self-important work that insists upon itself." Anusha Sundar of OTT Play gave 2.5/5 stars and wrote "Aidham Vedham can be given a shot to watch, but if it is really binge-worthy is debatable."

Narayani M of The New Indian Express gave 2.5/5 stars and wrote "Aindham Vedham could have conjured up a tighter screenplay, runtime and a show-don’t-tell set up, to create a solid premise that potentially opens a portal to a successful [sic] franchise in the future." Janani K of India Today gave 2/5 stars and wrote "Despite its occasional shortcomings, Aindham Vedham emerges as a noteworthy addition to Indian streaming content."
