= Krishnadasi (2000 TV series) =

Television series

- Genre: Soap opera
- Written by: Indra Soundar Rajan
- Directed by: Prabhoo Nepaul
- Starring: Gemini Ganesan; Nalini; Vietnam Veedu Sundaram; Ranjitha; Suja Raghuram; Aravind Akash
- Theme music composer: D. Imman
- Opening theme: "Sigaram Parthai" (vocals); Nithyasree Mahadevan; D. Imman; Kadhal Mathi (lyrics)
- Country of origin: India
- Original language: Tamil
- No. of seasons: 1
- No. of episodes: 359

Production
- Producer: Kutty Padmini
- Camera setup: Multi-camera
- Running time: Approx. 20-22 minutes
- Production company: Vaishnave Media Works

Original release
- Network: Sun TV; Raj TV
- Release: 14 February 2000 – 26 October 2001

Krishnadasi is an Indian Tamil-language soap opera. It aired on Sun TV from 14 February 2000 to 25 October 2001. The show stars Gemini Ganesan alongside Nalini, Vietnam Veedu Sundaram, Ranjitha, Aravind Akash, and Suja Raghuram. The show was produced by Prabhoo Nepaul. It is based on the novel written by Indra Soundar Rajan. The title track was composed by D. Imman and sung by Nithyasree Mahadevan.

Krishnadasi notably marked the last performance of Gemini Ganesan in a character role. It also marked the re-entry of actress Nalini into the media after a post-marriage 14-year hiatus, the debut of choreographer Raghuram's daughter Suja Raghuram as an actress and choreographer in television.

The title sequence is the first song composed by the music director D. Imman.

== Cast ==
Actor	Character Name	Character Description
Ranjitha	Krishnaveni	a dasi by birth, Meenatchi's mother and Manonmani's daughter - keeping the information about Meenatchi's father a secret for many years for reasons only known to her. Gowri's best friend.
Nalini	Manonmani	a dasi by birth, Krishnaveni's mother and Meenatchi's grandmother.
Gemini Ganesan	Bhooshanam Rudramuthi Sastri	Swaminatha Sastri's father, and Gowri's father.
Suja Raghuram	Meenaatchi	a dasi by birth, Krishnaveni's daughter and Manonmani's granddaughter.
Vietnam Veedu Sundaram	Saama	a procurer.
Rajasekhar	Swaminatha Sastri(Deekshitar)	Rudhramurthi Sastri's son - father to six children, five daughters and one son.
Vijayalakshmi	Santhanalakshmi	Swaminatha Sastri's wife - mother to six children, five daughters and one son.
Aravind Akash- Credited as Arvinder Singh	Sunderesan	Swaminatha Sastri's sixth child and only son.
Anju	Lecturer Kalyani	Santhanalaksmi's sister. She became a widow on the same day she got married and remained a widow.
"Kalaimamani" Naanjil Nalini	Pachaiamma	village midwife, extorts Manonnmani to safeguard a secret of hers.
Menaka	Gayathri	Swaminatha Sastri's fifth child and youngest daughter.
Manjari- Credited as Vinothini	Gowri/Gloria(after marriage)	Rudhramurthi Sastri's daughter, married a man from a different religion against the wishes of her family. Krishnaveni's best friend.
David Ramesh	David	Gowri's husband, Rudhramurthi Sastri's son-in-law.
Raja Ravindra	Muthukumarasaamy	A brother figure to Krishnaveni and her well-wisher.
K.Manogar	Godhandam	Swaminatha Sastri's fourth son-in-law.
Nagesh		
--	Visaalaatchi	Swaminatha Sastri's third daughter.
Shobana	Sunandha	Swaminatha Sastri's first daughter. Lives in Mumbai. Tries to marry her daughter to her brother Sunderesan.
Shanthi Ganesh	Sulochana	Swaminatha Sastri's second daughter. Lives in Delhi. Tries to marry her daughter to her brother Sunderesan.
--	Sowmya	Sugandha's daughter. Tries to marry Sunderesan.
--	Maya	Sulochana's daughter. Tries to marry Sunderesan.
--	Kokila(Koki)	Swaminatha Sastri's fourth daughter.
Rindhya	Indrani	Meenaatchi's friend from college.

== Plot ==
This serial revolved around the Devadasi practice that prevailed in Tamil Nadu almost a few years after India's independence and how the dasi women are treated by society. The story followed the rivalry between Rudramuthi Sastri, a very powerful Brahman in that village and his family and Manonmani, the dasi of the village and her family in the small hamlet of Kandhanallur on the banks of the river Kaveri.

Manonmani, a dasi comes back to her ancestral village of Kandhanallur with her daughter, Krishnaveni after 15 years of exile from the village where she, her daughter and baby granddaughter, Meenaatchi, were exiled by the village's people. As soon as she arrives, she goes to meet Rudhramoorthi Sastri and his son Saminatha Sastri and vows that she will wreak havoc in their perfect lives like they wrecked hers 15 years ago.

Meanwhile, Saminatha Sastri's son, Sunderesan falls in love with Meenaatchi while they are studying at the college. Krishnaveni never revealed who was Meenatchi's father to anyone for reasons only known to her but Meenaatchi is determined to find out the truth. Pachiamma, the village midwife extorts Manonmani to safeguard a secret known only to them.

== Soundtrack ==
Track listing
No.	Title	Lyrics	Music	Singer(s)	Length
1.	"Sigaram Parthai சிகரம் பார்த்தாய்"	Kadhal Mathi	D. Imman	Nithyasree Mahadevan, D. Imman	3:11

== Remake ==
Krishnadasi was remade in Hindi under the same title, starring Shravan Reddy and Sana Amin Sheikh on Colors with significant changes in the story.

== See also ==
- List of programs broadcast by Sun TV
- List of TV shows aired on Sun TV (India)
