= Indra Soundar Rajan =

Indian writer (1958–2024)

- Born: 13 November 1958; Salem, Madras State (now Tamil Nadu), India
- Died: 10 November 2024 (aged 65); Madurai, Tamil Nadu, India
- Occupation: Author
- Writing career
- Genres: Mystery, Ghost story, Supernatural Thrillers

P. Soundar Rajan (13 November 1958 – 10 November 2024), known by the pen name Indra Soundar Rajan, was an Indian Tamil author of short stories, novels, television serials, and screenplays.

== Work ==
Indra Soundar Rajan was an expert on South Indian Hindu traditions and mythological lore. He was employed in TVS Group of Companies before becoming a full-time writer. His stories typically deal with cases of supernatural occurrence, divine intervention, reincarnation, and ghosts; many stories foreground the conflict between rationalism, faith, and superstition. His stories are often based on or inspired by true stories reported from various locales around the state of Tamil Nadu.

Through most of the 1990s and 2000s, two or three of his "pocket novels" (about the length of a novella in English) were published every month in publications such as Crime Story and Today Crime News. Often, longer works were serialised over several issues.

Several of his novels have been translated to English, including The Aayakudi Murders, Out of the Blue, The Rebirth of Jeeva (in The Blaft Anthology of Tamil Pulp Fiction, Vol. 1), and The Palace of Kottaipuram (in The Blaft Anthology of Tamil Pulp Fiction, Vol. 2).

The teleserial Marmadesam, for which he wrote the screenplay, is said to be the most successful Tamil television show in history.

He wrote more than 300 episodes for the Podhigai TV program "Kanchiyin Karunai", which tells of the greatness of Shri Chandrasekhara Saraswathi Swamigal, the pontiff of Kanchipuram Shankara mutt.

== Personal life and death ==
Rajan was born in Salem, Madras State, India on 13 November 1958. He lived in Madurai, where he died on 10 November 2024, at the age of 65.

== Selected works ==
=== Fiction ===
- Aval Oru Savithri
- Sri Puram
- Abaaya Malli
- Enge en kannan
- Kallukkul Pugundha Uyir
- Neelakkal Modhiram
- Sornajaalam
- Unnai Kaivitamaattaen
- Nandi Ragasiyam
- Sadhiyai Sandippom
- Thevar koyil Roja
- Maaya Vizhigal
- Maayamaaga Pogiraargal
- Muthu pandhal
- Thulli Varuguthu
- Naagapanjami
- Kan Simittum Ratthinakkal
- Thangakkaadu
- Kaatru Kaatru Uyir
- Thoda Thoda Thangam
- Aindhu Vazhi Moondru Vaasal
- Ush!
- Mahadeva Ragasiyam
- Sutri Sutri Varuven
- Kattray Varuven
- Kottaippuratthu Veedu
- Ragaisyamaai Oru Ragasiyam
- Sivarahasiyam
- Thitti Vaasal Marmam
- Vairabommai
- Kaadhal Kuttavaali
- Krishna Thandhiram
- Penmanam
- Pen Ulavaali
- Jeeva En Jeeva
- Sorna Regai
- Vittu Vidu Karuppa (Marmadesam - Vidaathu Karuppu)
- Iyandira Paravai
- Vaanathu Manidhargal
- Rudra Veenai, Part 1, 2, 3 & 4
- Vikrama Vikrama, Part 1 & 2
- Kannigal Ezhupaer
- Ayiram Arivaal Kottai
- Thedathe Tholaindu Poevaai 1 & 2
- Sivamayam, Part 1 & 2
- Mandira Viral
- Naan Ramasheshan Vanthuruken
- Olivatharku Idamillai
- Athu Mattum Ragasiyam
- Pallavan Pandiyan Baskaran
- Melae Uyarae Uchiyilae, Part 1 & 2
- Naaga Padai
- Mayamai Sillar
- Maya Vanam
- Ranga neadhi
- Appavin Aathma
- Sittha Ragasiyam
- Katrodu Oru Yuttham
- Naaga PADAI
- Naaga vanam (YET TO BE RELEASED)
- Asura sddas
- Sivaragasiyam
- Sakthi Raajyam
- Sakthi
- Chidambara Ragasiyam
- Ragasiyam Parama(n) Ragasiyam

=== Television Serials ===
- Kottai Purathu Veedu, (DD Podhigai)
  - This serial is adapted in Hindi as Kaal Bhairav - Ek Naya Rahasya and telecasted on Star Bharat.
- Yen Peyar Ranganayaki, (Sun TV)
- chithi (sun tv)
- Sivamayam, (Sun TV)
- Rudra Veenai, Sun TV
- Marmadesam, Sun TV, Raj TV
  - Ragasiyam (Secret):
    - Vasanth TV retelecasted this serial in 2016.
    - This serial was adapted and aired on Star Bharat as Kaal Bhairav Rahasya and completed its run in 2018.
  - Vidathu Karuppu (Karuppu Never Spares):
    - Vasanth TV retelecasted this serial in 2015.
  - Sorna Regai (Golden Palmlines)
  - Iyanthira Paravai (The Mechanical Bird)
  - Ethuvum Nadhakum (Anything might happen)
- Maayavettai
- Mandhira Vaasal
- Thedathe Tholaindu Povaai
- Krishnadasi, Sun TV
  - This serial was adapted and aired on Colors as Krishnadasi .
- Yamirukka Bayamenn (TV series), Vijay TV
- Adhu Mattum Ragasiyam, Sun TV
- Atthi Pookal, Sun TV
- Rudhram, Jaya TV
- Puguntha Veedu, Zee Tamil
- Nagamma (TV Series), Sun TV
- Siva Ragasiyam, Zee Tamil. Thangamana Purushan- Kalaignar TV.
- Ganga (TV Series), Sun TV
- Subramaniyapuram (2018 TV Series), Jaya TV

=== As an actor ===
Ragasiyam - Journalist Srikanth (Guest Appearance)

=== Hindi Adaptations ===
- Krishnadasi (2016 TV series) (Colors)
- Kaal Bhairav Rahasya, (Star Bharat)
- Kaal Bhairav - Ek Naya Rahasya (Star Bharat)

=== Films ===
- Sringaram (2007)
- Anandhapurathu Veedu (2010)
- Iruttu (2019)
- Kattil (2023)
