= Krishnadasi (2016 TV series) =

2016 TV series

- Also known as: Krishndasi
- Genre: Fiction
- Created by: Kutty Padmini; Vipul D. Shah
- Based on: Krishnadasi by Indra Soundar Rajan
- Screenplay by: Manish Paliwal; Manoj Tripathi
- Story by: Sonali Jaffar; Priyali Saxena; Kovid Gupta
- Creative director: Mukta Dhond/Nishtha Yadav/Ram Dixit
- Starring: See below
- Country of origin: India
- Original language: Hindi
- No. of seasons: 1
- No. of episodes: 188

Production
- Producers: Kutty Padmini; Vipul D. Shah
- Production locations: Krishnavathi; Pune; Mumbai
- Camera setup: Single-camera
- Production company: Optimystix Entertainment

Original release
- Network: Colors TV
- Release: 25 January – 12 October 2016

Krishnadasi (transl. Krishna's Devotee) is an Indian fiction television series. It premiered on 25 January 2016 on Colors TV. It is based on the Tamil serial of the same name which itself is based on a book of the same name written by the Tamil author Indra Soundar Rajan which aired on Sun TV. Produced by Kutty Padmini and Optimystix Entertainment, it starred Shravan Reddy and Sana Amin Sheikh.

The series revolves around the life of a young girl Aradhya, known as the daughter of Tulsi a Devdasi but turns out to be a granddaughter of Pradyumna Vidhyadhar Rao and Rao family which is the biggest rival of the Devdasis.Aryan was known as son of Rao family turns out to be son of Tulsi and Tulsi's mother Kumudini who's also a Devdasi had swapped Aryan and Aradhya on their birth to take revenge from Pradyumna. Krishnadasi describes the harsh realities and truths of religious Devdasi customs in a remote village of Krishnavati in Pune district and the lives of Devdasis.

== Synopsis ==
Krishndasi is a love story told in the backdrop of hatred and conflict due to Aradhya's lineage of a Devdasi family and her connection with Aryan's Rao family, whose family holds a grudge against Aradhya's family due to some hidden past. It is set in the small hamlet of Krishnavati, where Devdasi custom prevails amid poverty.

After initially hating each other, Aradhya and Aryan fall in love with each other and get married. It is later revealed that Aradhya is in fact the Rao family's daughter and Aryan is the Devdasi family's son. Devdasi Kumudini had swapped Aradhya and Aryan at their birth. Aradhya and Aryan try to unite their families. They separate due to misunderstandings but soon reunite. Somehow completing its journey this show ends.

== Plot ==
The story starts with an angry mob chasing Krishnadasi Kumudini, her daughter Tulsi and a newborn Aradhya. The trio escapes with great difficulty while the mob warns them not to set foot in Krishnavati in the next 21 years as punishment.

21 years later, Kumudini is shown standing at the border of Krishnavati. She vows to settle scores with everyone who had wronged her and returns to her present home in Pune. Tulsi is reluctant to go back as she doesn't want her daughter Aradhya to learn about their lineage.

Aradhya is shown to have grown up as a strong young woman. She goes for a college camp near Krishnavati and gets into an argument with Pradhyumna Vidyadhar Rao/Aaba Saheb – the head of the village, when he forces a girl to become a Krishnadasi. Aaba Saheb's goons abduct Aradhya and attempt to publicly disrobe her for insulting their age old tradition. A mysterious guy comes riding a horse and saves her.

Aradhya returns home but hides her abduction truth from Tulsi. Kumudini fakes her medical report and emotionally blackmails Tulsi to accompany her to Krishnavati. They get Aradhya admitted into a hostel and leave for their village. On the first day itself, Aradhya gets into a fight with Aryan. Aryan is the same guy who had rescued her. But Aradhya couldn't see his face clearly due to Bhang's effect while Aryan didn't recognize her due to the color and vermillion on her face. Soon, Aradhya learns about Aryan being her savior and befriends him. She pays a surprise visit to Krishnavati, where she learns about Tulsi and Kumudini's identity. Shattered at first, Aradhya accepts the truth. She returns to her college and resumes her normal life. During a debate competition, her identity is revealed and she realizes how educated people also point finger only at the victims of Devdasi custom and try to exploit the helpless women. She decides to return to her village so she can initiate the necessary changes at her locality. Perplexed at Aradhya's sudden departure, Aryan too leaves for his home. It is later revealed that Aryan is Aaba Saheb's grandson and the heir of Rao family. Seeing the ongoing feud between their families, Aryan and Aradhya request their mothers to tell them the truth about their family dispute.

Aaba Saheb's brother in law, Maharaj Keshav Pratap was the patron of Kumudini. He fell in love with her and wanted to marry her. But Kumudini refused to his proposal as a Krishnadasi cannot marry her patron. Besides, she didn't want to break off his marriage and left his palace with Tulsi – their daughter. However, deeply tormented by her husband's infidelity, Aaba Saheb's sister committed suicide. This enraged Aaba Saheb and he pledged revenge from Kumudini. Aaba Saheb's younger daughter Saras and Tulsi grew up to become best friends. When Saras fell in love with Michael, Shashwat and Tulsi tried to prevent her from taking any wrong step. But Pavitra suspected Shashwat to have an affair with Tulsi. Later, Saras eloped with Michael on her wedding day and everyone blamed Tulsi. Unable to bear the humiliation, Aaba Saheb's wife Bhamini committed suicide. Using this opportunity, Aaba Saheb threw Kumudini and Tulsi out of their village.

After learning the truth, Aryan develops hatred for Aradhya's family and continuously insults them. Although he saves her multiple times on different occasions, he refuses to acknowledge his feelings for her. His annoyance increases further when Kumudini traps Gayatri and orchestrates her marriage with David - Saras's brother in law. However, both Aradhya and Aryan realize that both of the families are at fault and join hands to end the enmity between their families.

Kumudini and Aaba Saheb continue their plotting to destroy each other. Pavitra realizing Aryan's growing feelings for Aradhya, invites his childhood friend Purva. But circumstances lead to Aryan publicly declaring that he would marry Aradhya. At first, Aradhya refuses thinking Aryan is marrying her just to save her from the villagers. When Aryan finally confesses his love to Aradhya, she also reciprocates.

Aaba Saheb fakes a heart attack to stop the marriage. To counterattack, Kumudini drugs Aradhya and alleges Aryan of molesting her. Then she forces Aradhya and Aryan to get married. Aryan and Aradhya are deeply hurt by each other's actions and start hating each other. Pavitra and Purva try to separate the two. However, these difficulties only bring them closer. They get to know about Purva and her brother Jayraj's intention of taking over Rao's wealth and stop them. However, Kumudini makes a shocking revelation that Aradhya is Aaba Saheb's granddaughter and Aryan is her grandson.

This again brings a storm in Aryan and Aradhya's life. Aaba Saheb threatens Aradhya about Tulsi and forces her to insult her and Kumudini. Aryan and Kumudini become shocked at her sudden change of behavior but Tulsi understands Aradhya's helplessness. Kumudini uses this situation to provoke Aryan against Rao family. Yashwant Chimaji – Aryan's father, accepts Tulsi in front of everyone and they both decide to leave Krishnavati with Aryan and Aradhya. Jayraj returns and shoots at Aryan. But Tulsi comes in between and dies. Aryan holds Aaba Saheb responsible for his mother's death and vows to punish him. In the court, Aradhya speaks in favor of Aaba Saheb which further infuriates Aryan. He divorces Aradhya and throws her along with Rao family out of his house.

Aradhya becomes her family's strength while trying her best to make Aryan realize the truth. She also brings a change in Aaba Saheb's thinking. After a series of events, Aryan realizes Aradhya's innocence and reunites with her. Blinded by her hatred for Aaba Saheb and Aradhya, Kumudini vows to separate them.

A new character Shravani is introduced. She is Jayraj's wife and partner in crime. She takes shelter in Aryan's house. Kumudini uses her to create misunderstanding between Aryan and Aradhya. However, Shravani falls in love with Aryan and fools Jayraj and Kumudini. She drugs Aryan and alleges him of sleeping with her. Aradhya is heartbroken and meets with a fatal accident. A month later, Aryan spots Aradhya in an orphanage and brings her home. Shravani further complicates the situation saying she is pregnant. Aradhya severs all ties with Aryan and urges him to marry Shravani. Soon it is revealed that Shravani is Aradhya's long lost twin sister and Bhamini is alive.

Gayatri and David bring their friend Uday to reunite Aryan with Aradhya. However, Aradhya is adamant on her decision and fakes a marriage with Uday to persuade Aryan to marry Shravani. Realizing Shravani's deceit, Jayraj breaks into her room and Aradhya accidentally shoots him. Police take her away but before leaving, she requests Aryan to marry Shravani. Soon after Aryan's marriage, Aradhya learns the truth about Shravani and realizes her mistake. She breaks down recalling her misbehavior with Aryan and requests Uday to pass her letter to Aryan so that she can apologize to him. To conceal the truth, Shravani poisons her own family members and ignites fire in Aradhya's jail. Kumudini finally learns about Aradhya' sacrifices and goes to apologize to her. Aryan gets to know about the fire incident and rushes to save Aradhya. However he finds another woman dressed as Aradhya and assumes her to be dead.

In the hospital, Aaba Saheb regains consciousness but all his family members are declared dead. After rescuing Aradhya, he reaches to Aryan's house with Uday but misunderstands Aryan to be involved with Shravani. They leave Krishnavati with Aradhya.

A leap of 6 months is shown. Aradhya returns with a new identity of Aruna Devi and vows revenge from Aryan and Shravani. Kumudini is shown to be suffering from a mental disorder after Aradhya's death. Soon all their misunderstandings get cleared. Aryan reveals how he had saved Rao family and kept acting before Shravani to make her confess her crimes. Together, they bring out Shravani's truth. Finally, Aryan and Aradhya get married with everyone's blessing. Kumudini and Aaba Saheb join hands and decide to eradicate Devdasi custom from Krishnavati. The show ends on a happy note.

== Cast ==
=== Main ===
- Sana Amin Sheikh as Aradhya Rao Chima- Aryan’s wife, Shashwant and Pavitra’s biological daughter, Gayatri and Shravani’s sister, Pradhyumna’s biological granddaughter
- Shravan Reddy as Aryan Yashwant Chima- Aradhya’s husband, Tulsi and Yashwant’s biological son, Kumudini’s biological grandson

=== Recurring ===
- Indira Krishnan as Krishnadasi Kumudini- Aryan's biological grandmother
- Chhavi Mittal/Jaya Binju as Tulsi Chima- Aryan's biological mother, Aradhya’s former adoptive mother
- Uday Tikekar as Pradhyumna Vidyadhar Rao- Aradhya's biological grandfather
- Neha Bam as Bhamini Vidyadhar Rao- Aradhya's biological grandmother, Pradhyumna’s wife
- Jiten Lalwani as Shashwat Vidhayadhar Rao- Aradhya, Shravani and Gayatri's father, Aryan’s former adoptive father
- Shweta Mahadik as Pavitra Vidyadhar Rao- Aradhya, Shravani and Gayatri's mother, Aryan’s former adoptive mother
- Mihir Mishra as Yashwant Chima- Aryan's father
- Tasha Kapoor as Gayatri Fernandes- Shashwat and Pavitra’s eldest daughter, Aradhya and Shravani’s elder sister, David's wife
- Achherr Bhaardwaj as David Fernandes- Gayatri's husband
- Diya Makhija as Shravani Rao- Shashwat and Pavitra’s youngest daughter, Gayatri’s sister and Aradhya’s twin sister
- Sonal Handa as Jairaj Deshmukh, Purva’s brother
- Sneha Jain/Priyanka Purohit as Purva Deshmukh- Aryan's ex-fiancée
- Samya Mahadkar as Damini Lokhande
- Anjali Ujawane as Naku
- Kaivalya Chheda as Ganesh Deshmukh
- Nikki Sharma as Shivani
- Vishal Bhardwaj as Varun
- Siddharth Shivpuri as Uday- Aradhya's ex-fiancée
- Tejasswi Prakash as Ragini
- Anita Hassanandani
- Aishwarya Sakhuja
- Shakti Arora
- Ahmad Harhash as Laksh Malhotra

== Integration episodes ==
Krishnadasi (2016 TV series) had two integration episodes with Swaragini - Jodein Rishton Ke Sur.
