= Chetan (actor) =

Indian actor and television presenter

- Born: Chetan; 30 September 1970 (age 56); Bangalore, Karnataka, India
- Occupations: Television and film actor
- Years active: 1994-present
- Spouse: Devadarshini
- Children: 1

Chetan (born 30 September 1970) is an Indian actor who works in Tamil language television and films. He is married to television actress Devadarshini who starred with him in Vidadhu Karuppu, part of the television series Marmadesam.

He has had regular roles in television serials such as Ananda Bhavan and Metti Oli.

== Career ==
Chetan's top turnover was on the 811-episode Sun TV serial Metti Oli and the 1272-episode serial Athipookal, in which he starred along with his wife Devadarshini.

His notable films include Polladhavan, Tamizh Padam 2, Kaithi, Master, Ayothi, Viduthalai Part 1 and Viduthalai Part 2.

== Personal life ==
His mother tongue is Kannada. He is married to frequent co-star Devadarshini. They have a daughter, Niyathi who made her acting debut in '96 portraying the younger version of Devadarshini.

== Filmography ==
=== Television ===
- Ramayanam
- Marmadesam: Vidathu Karuppu as Rajendran/Karuppusami
- Marmadesam: Iyanthira Paravai as Kasinathan
- Nimmathi Ungal Choice as Balram
- Kudumbam
- Irandam Chanakyan as Santhana Raman
- Vazhkkai as Rishi
- Nambikkai as Vasanth & Raja
- Thedathe Tholainthu Povai
- Kaveri
- Panchavarnakkili as Raghupathi
- Ananda Bhavan as Ganesh
- Thurupidikkum Manasu
- Metti Oli as Manikkam
- Ramany vs Ramany Part 1
- Adugiran Kannan as Kannan
- En Thozhi En Kadhali En Manaivi
- Malargal as Kathirvel
- Lakshmi as Aravind
- Athipookal as Manohar
- Simran Thirai: Kannamoochi Ray Ray
- Nagamma
- En Peyar Ranganayagi as Srikanth
- Rudhraveenai as Swaminathan
- Uthiripookkal as Sivanesan
- Anna (special appearance)
- Pyar Ka Pehla Naam: Radha Mohan as B. Yezhusaamy (special appearance)
- Thalaivettiyaan Paalayam (2024)

=== Amazon Prime ===
- Vadhandhi season 2 The Mystery of ManI (2026)

=== Films ===
==== Tamil ====
Key
†	Denotes films that have not yet been released

Year	Title	Role	Notes
2007	Pollaadhavan	Prabhu's boss	
2007	Puli Varudhu	Vetri	
2008	Dhaam Dhoom	Sarasu's husband	
2008	Saroja	Himself	Special appearance in "Aaja Meri Soniye"
2009	Padikathavan	Gowtham	
2009	Rajathi Raja	Sub inspector Shakthivel	
2009	Muthirai	Krishna	
2009	Pudhiya Payanam	Devi's husband	
2010	Dandam Dashagunam	Sivanesan	Special appearance
2014	Aadama Jaichomada	Mariadas	
2014	Vilaasam	Dr.Naghendirababu	
2015	Andhadhi	Durairaj	
2016	Azhagu Kutti Chellam	Anandhi's husband	
2016	Narathan		
2016	Revelations		
2017	Nibunan	Mariadaas	Bilingual film
2018	Traffic Ramasamy		
2018	Semma Botha Aagathey	Ram	
2018	Tamizh Padam 2	B. Yezhusaamy	
2019	House Owner	Mani	
2019	Kennedy Club		
2019	Kalavu	Sujeeth's father	Released on ZEE5
2019	Kaithi	Dr. Amudhan	Uncredited role
2021	Master	Professor	
2021	Annabelle Sethupathi	Sundhar Pandiyan	
2022	Kuthiraivaal	Babu	
2022	Dejavu	Chetan	
2022	Kaatteri	Kesava Perumal	
2023	Ayothi	Terminal Manager	
2023	Viduthalai Part 1	Ragavendar	
2024	Jama	Thandavam	
2024	Viduthalai Part 2	Ragavendar	
2025	Kingston	Solomon	
2025	Sumo	Pandian	
2025	Thug Life	Stan	
2025	DNA	Sivasubramaniam	
2026	Parasakthi	C. N. Annadurai	
2026	Anbe Diana	Chirumamilla Adinarayana Bhaskar	
2026	Modha Rathri	Poosari	
2026	Ram and Leela	Ram's father	
2026	Titanic		

=== As dubbing artist ===
Year	Title	Actor	Role	Notes
2004	Kanavu Meippada Vendum	Asim Sharma	Mohanasundaram	
2007	Marudhamalai	Lal	Maasi	
2009	Padikkadavan	Suman	Samarasimha Reddy	
2010	Mandhira Punnagai	G. Dhananjayan	CEO - UTV South	
2014	Anjaan	Manoj Bajpayee	Imran	
2014	Vallavanukku Pullum Aayudham	Nagineedu		
2018	Imaikkaa Nodigal	Devan	Narayan Gowda	
2018	2.0	Adil Hussain		
2019	Saaho	Murali Sharma	David Karuna	
2020	Darbar	Nawab Shah	Vinod Malhotra/ Vinod Prathap	
2020	Dagaalty	Tarun Arora	Vijay Samrat	
2021	Pushpa: The Rise	Sunil	Mangalam Srinu	For Tamil dubbed version
2022	Sita Ramam	Pawan Chopra	Musa Khan	For Tamil dubbed version
2022	Ponniyin Selvan: I	Yog Japee	Karuthiruman	
2023	Varisu	Suman	Gautham	
2023	Run Baby Run	Nagineedu	Priyanka’s father	
2023	Ponniyin Selvan: II	Yog Japee; Makarand Deshpande	Karuthiruman; Chief Kalamugar	
2024	Maharaja	Anurag Kashyap	Selvam	
2025	Madha Gaja Raja	Sonu Sood	Karuguvel Viswanth	
2025	Thanal	Selva	ADCP R. Thiruvalluvan	
