= Naga (director) =

Indian film director

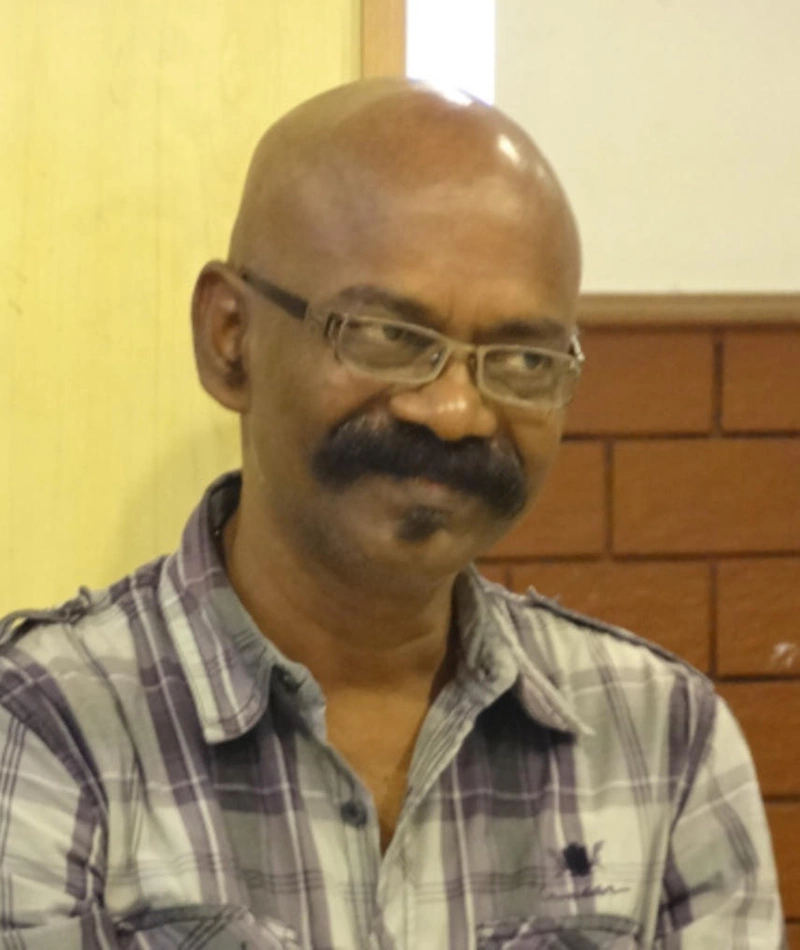
- Born: Nagarajan Lingam; Chennai, Tamil Nadu, India
- Occupations: Film & TV Cinematographer Writer, Director, Producer
- Years active: 1989–present

Naga (Tamil: நாகா, birthname Nagarajan; 1963) is a director of Tamil films and TV shows from Tamil Nadu, India. He is known for directing the television series Marmadesam in the late 1990s. He made his debut as a film director in 2010 with Anandhapurathu Veedu. He is an alumnus of the Film and Television Institute of India, Pune.

== Filmography ==
=== Feature films ===
Year	Title	Director	Writer	Cinematographer
1990	Gawaahi	No	No	Yes
1991	Patthar Ke Phool	No	No	Yes
2010	Anandhapurathu Veedu	Yes	Yes	No

=== Television dramas ===
Year	Title	Director	Writer	Cinematographer	Producer	Channel
1987	Hum Panchhi Ek Dal Ke	No	No	Yes	No	DD National
1995	Kaiyalavu Manasu	No	No	Yes	No	Sun TV
1995	Nambinaal Nambungal	Yes	Yes	Yes	Yes	
1996	Marmadesam-Ragasiyam	Yes	No	Yes	No	Sun TV
1997	Ramany vs Ramany (Season 1)	Yes	No	No	No	Sun TV
1997	Marmadesam-Vidaathu Karuppu	Yes	No	No	No	Sun TV
2001	Ramany vs Ramany (Season 2)	Yes	Yes	No	No	Raj TV
2002	Marmadesam- Edhuvum Nadakum	Yes	Yes	No	No	Raj TV
2004	Rudraveena (TV series)	Yes	No	No	No	Sun TV
2005	Veettukku Veedu Looti	Yes	Yes	No	No	Jaya TV
2006	Chidambara Rahasiyam (TV series)	Yes	Yes	No	Yes	Sun TV
2008	Yamirukka Bayamen	No	Yes	No	No	Star Vijay
2022	Ramany vs Ramany - 3.0	Yes	Yes	No	No	Aha Tamil
2024	Thalaivettiyanpalayam	Yes	No	No	No	Amazon Prime
2024	Aindham Vedham	Yes	Yes	No	No	Zee5
