= Rudraveena (TV series) =

2002 Tamil television series

- Also known as: Rudraveenai
- Genre: Mystery-Suspense
- Based on: Rudhraveenai by Indra Soundar Rajan
- Written by: Indra Soundar Rajan
- Directed by: Naga
- Starring: Chethan; Santhoshi; Kaveri; Bala Singh; Y. G. Mahendra
- Theme music composer: Ramesh Krishna
- Country of origin: India
- Original language: Tamil
- No. of seasons: 1
- No. of episodes: 106

Production
- Producer: Radhika
- Production location: Tamil Nadu
- Camera setup: Multi-camera
- Running time: Approx. 20-22 minutes per episode
- Production company: Radaan Mediaworks Enterprises

Original release
- Network: Sun TV
- Release: 21 April 2002 – 22 February 2004

Rudraveena or Rudraveenai is a Tamil mystery-suspense television series directed by Naga. It is an adaptation of Indra Soundar Rajan's book of the same name. From 21 April 2002 to 22 February 2004, the series broadcast 106 episodes on Sun TV on Wednesdays at 8:30 p.m. local time. Rudraveena replaced another mystery-suspense series in its time slot called Thandhira Bhoomi. This series was remade in Malayalam bearing the same name, but with significant changes to the story. However, the past segment with Baba was dubbed from the Tamil version.

== Plot ==
Rudra Veenai is a nail biting tele series, based on Indra Sounder Rajan's novel of the same name. Rudhra Veenai is about a Veena, which have something like a magical power. Hearing different types of tunes have many positive effects on the listener. In the year of 1701 AD, an old man from the Northern Regions of India, called Baba, goes on a trail by legs to the a small village, Thodipuram in the Southern State of Tamil Nadu. He carries the Rudhra Veena on his shoulders and is on the quest to return to Lord Shiva, on Navaratri, in the village of Thodipuram.

Simultaneously, the current happening in Thodipuram is also shown. 300 years later in 2002, the Thodipuram village have a separate pride. Veena sound could be heard now and then throughout the village. The main characters are people in the village. The Village President, Kalyana Sundaram, who holds a grudge against a woman named Dasi Sundrambal, who is a saint woman giving advices to the villagers. A 'Shakti Upsagar' Narashima Barathi. The Chief Priest of the Thodieswaran Temple, Pattar. The mute eldest Daughter of Pattar, Mythili and her elder brother Shankaran, who is the best friend of Kalayana Sundaram's son, Swaminathan. Banu, who is Sundarambal's only daughter who is in love with Shankaran without her knowing that Swaminathan is in love with her and finally, her Half-brother Ashokan.

Mysterious things happen in Rani Bungalow, where the Veena is being played. No one knows who plays it although they are believing it to be Baba's Spirit. It was told that Baba had stayed in the Bungalow 300 years ago and died there. Baba's tomb is residing there, in Rani Bungalows backyard. No one can near the Bungalow and if they attempt to do so, they get attacked by bees and serpents guarding the place. The only people who can near the Bungalow is the women of Dasi family yet, it is unknown if Banu could enter it. Other than the Dasi family women, their help Thilagam accompany them without any harm. People who forcefully enter it, gets hurt. A graveyard man who lives in the graveyard on the pathway to Rank Bungalow, prevents people from going that way.

Here comes the 'Upsagar', Narashima Barathi. Seeking ways to attain the Rudhra Veena for himself, he tries many tricks, much to his Guru's annoyance and avoidance. But, as per Baba's words, only the reincarnation of Lord Shiva, named Rudhran can get hold of the Veena. Many men, thinking themselves as Rudhran, tries to get hold of the Veena.

As more mysterious things happen around Rani Bungalow and around Thodipuram, people start doubting each other. A man called Neelakandan is going behind Narashima Barathi to prevent him from getting hold of the Rudhra Veenai. Here comes a man, called Rudhraeshwaran, who has evil intentions. He is the reincarnation of an evil man, Kaapaaligan from Baba's days, who had been after the Veenai last time. An ancestor's corpse, in Karnam's house with some information of the Veenai is found. More questions arise as the show progress.

Who the real Rudhran is? Where does the Veena go? Who plays the Veena every night? What is causing the heavy protection around the Rani Bungalow? Why are the Dasi women going to the Bungalow at night and doing some mysterious Poojai? All these are answered as the show progresses.

== Cast ==
- Y. G. Mahendran as "Sakthi Upasagar" Narasimha Barathi, a devotee of Mother Goddess who came to Thodipuram to acquire the Rudraveenai in order to reclaim the eyesight of his blind wife and also to reconstruct his poverty stricken hometown Sakthipuram. Initially shown to be the antagonist of the series but later revealed to be one of the main protagonists of the series(AD 2003)
- Mekha Rajan / Vanaja as Mythili, Pattar's mute elder daughter, Sankaran and Gayathri's sister. She is the incarnation of Mother Goddess and destined to marry Rudhran, who is Lord Shiva. (AD 2003)
- Chetan as Swaminathan, Kalyanasundaram's son, People presumed him to be 'Rudhran'. He is Sankaran's best friend. (AD 2003)
- Sreeram as Sankaran, Pattar's only son and Banu's lover. Mythili and Gayathri's brother. He is Swaminathan's best friend. (AD 2003)
- Nisha Ajay as Banu, Dasi Sundarambal's daughter, Shankaran's lover and Swaminathan's one-sided love interest (AD 2003)
- Shylaja Chetlur as Dasi Sundarambal, Banu's mother. The singing prodigy and the guard of Rudraveenai.(AD 2003)
- Aadukalam Naren as Ramachandran, Sundarambal's husband. Banu and Asokan's father. (AD 2003)
- S Gnanavel as Baba alias Nawab Khan Baba, the divine saint of Thodipuram. Who later got stabbed by Kapilikan to death but he kills him playing Rudhraveenai before he dies(AD 1702)
- Santhoshi as Dasi Aparaajitha Vaijayanthi, ancestor of Banu, Sundarambal, and Manicavalli (AD 1702)
- Kaveri as Dasi Malli, Aparaajitha Vaijayanthi's mother who later got killed by Kapalikan (AD 1702)
- Naveen Ram as Veerendra, Aparaajitha Vaijayanthi's brother (AD 1702)
- Charukesh as Ashokan, Sundarambal's step-son, Banu's half-brother (Baba's Spirit temporarily pocessess him to guide Sundaramba and Mythili) (AD 2003)
- Bala Singh as Kalyanasundaram, village president and Swaminathan's father. He is known for his nadhaswaram skills.(AD 2003)
- Gauthami Vembunathan as Rangayi, Kalyanasundaram's wife and Swaminathan's mother (AD 2003)
- Vijay Anand as Ganesan, Karnam's son and Gayathri's lover (AD 2003)
- Uma Maheshwari as Akhila, Ganesan's cousin who wants to marry him (AD 2003)
- Sreenivasan as Kovil Pattar Parameswaran, father of Shankaran, Mythili and Gayathri. (AD 2003)
- Archana as Gayathri, Ganesan's lover. Pattar's daughter. Sankaran and Mythili's sister. (AD 2003)
- E. V. Ganesh Babu as Neelakandan, Guruji's spy (AD 2003)
- Nagalakshmi as Thilagam, the Dasi family's helper (AD 2003)
- Rani Somanathan as Dasi Manicavalli, Dasi Sundarambal's mother and Bhanu's grandmother (AD 2003)
- Bhanu Prakash as Rudhreshwar, reincarnation of Kapalikan who later get killed by Sankaran who temporarily get possessed by divine god Bhairavan as set up by Mythili (Main Antagonist) (AD 2003)
- Minnal Deepa as Manthrini, Rudhreshwar's assistant (AD 2003)
- Ramachandran as Kapalikan who stabs Baba to death to forcefully claim Raagamanthiram and Rudhraveenai. Before dying Baba kills him by playing Rudhraveenai to make the clouds strike lightning. (Main Antagonist) (AD 1702)
- Sampath Ram as Vettiyaan Karuppan, who is a guard to Rani Bungalow and surprisingly has a great sense of music and songs who later revealed to be the real Rudhran who gets hold of the Rudhraveenai and also destined to marry Mythili (AD 2003)
