= Chidambara Rahasiyam (TV series) =

2004 Indian television series

- Directed by: Naga
- Starring: Krishna; Y. Gee. Mahendra; Nithya Ravindran; Mohan V. Ram; Malavika Avinash; Devadarshini; Bombay Gnanam
- Theme music composer: Rehan
- Country of origin: India
- Original language: Tamil
- No. of episodes: 105

Production
- Producers: Anil Mishra, P.K.Tiwari
- Camera setup: Multi-camera
- Running time: Approx. 20-22 minutes per episode
- Production companies: Pearl Media; Vision Times India PVT LTD

Original release
- Network: Sun TV
- Release: 29 February 2004 – 23 July 2006

Chidambara Ragasiyam (transl. The Secret of Chidambaram) is an Indian Tamil-language suspense series directed by Naga and produced by Anil Mishr and P.K. Tiwari. This show replaced Rudhraveenai on Wednesdays at 8:30 pm. It aired in Sun TV during the years 2004–2006. This was a successful series. It revolved around the practice of "Nadi astrology", a very popular belief in Tamil Nadu and widely practiced around Vaitheeswaran Koil area near Chidambaram. The series aired on Wednesday at 8:30 p.m. The last episode was aired on Sunday, 23 July 2006 at 7.30pm. This serial was also dubbed in Telugu and was telecasted in ETV.

== Plot ==
The story revolves around a young journalist Somu, working for Neithal Magazine in Chennai. The company's chief editor, Kumaraguru is like Somu's philosopher. He guides Somu like his own son. Kumaraguru has a daughter, named Thulasi, who is seen acting differently and making origami. Somu and his friend Padmarajan go around Chennai, interviewing people, on a title of previous birth. Once, they meet a beggar and homeless man who says that everything is a line. Somu gets too confused, when the man says he would see an accident on his way back. When the accident happens, Somu freaks out. The accident claimed a young man's life and a water tanker lorry was the cause of it. To avenge his anger, Somu tarnishes all tanker lorries around Chennai for their reckless driving.

Aarthi, a young girl working in Chennai Meteorological Department, is Somu's childhood friend. She is a very talkative girl. Her father is Thillairajan, who is a doctor and he easily believes in all things. Aarthi deduces that Somu would get angry at 4 pm the next day, and sure enough he does as his article about the tanker lorry is not published as expected. Kumaraguru says to Somu that he is hasty in everything and needs patience. Somu realized that the victim of the accident is getting married soon. He together with Padmarajan, got to the victim's fiancée home, only with his father-in-law's identity. The man happened to be a Tamil teacher (Tamil vathiyar). But when Somu and Padmarajan go there, they realize that the man and his daughter had both died. Somu finds the home ransacked and that someone has taken the guy's fingerprint.

When Somu confines in Kumaraguru, he tells Somu about Nadi Josiyam. Nadi Josiyam is a type of method to find our future through astrology, with the help of the person's thumb impression and some palm-leaf manuscripts. Somu goes and meets a nadi josiyar, with the accident victim's thumb print. The nadi josiyar, Ponnambalam, refuses to further read it as the man is dead. On Somu's request to trust nadi josiyam, the nadi josiyar asks him to take a living man's fingerprint and see him tomorrow. Somu then takes the fingerprint of the beggar. The beggar then dies after fainting on the roadside. The next day, together with Aarthi, Somu goes to meet Ponnambalam to find him dead. Aarthi finds that someone took his fingerprint. She does too and they go to meet another nadi josiyar, Anbarasu. Anbarasu tells Somu that someone came with the man's fingerprint and took away the manuscript.

Meanwhile, an NRI from America, Akash, comes to Chidambaram to visit his grandmother. He works in a company that provides biometric security systems. Aarthi's meteorological department had requested the company to provide security systems to their company. Akash has a strong American accent, which makes his Tamil sound very different. He stays with his grandmother for his holidays, when his cousin Abhirami comes to stay there as well. Abhirami's aunt, who by right should have been married to Akash's father, is suffering from Leukemia. Akash quickly gets interested in Nadi Josiyam after meeting their neighbour, Nadi Josiyar Mani. Akash's grandmother Visalakshi gives him an old manuscript done by her father-in-law, to Akash which excites him. Visalakshi soon regrets her act when the boy gets too interested in it.

Meanwhile, Aarthi sends her sister Archana's barathanatiyam dance instructor to Somu's office for an interview, much to Somu's annoyance. Irritated, he asks the man to go home and that he would meet him there the next day. But when he goes there with Padmarajan, the instructor, Natesan Sharma, dies after falling from his flat. Somu sees that his thumbprint is taken as well and also sees a church father there. AC Adiyapatham investigates all these cases, including Tamil Vathiyar's, and starts suspecting Somu, as he is seen at all crime scenes.

Akash brings the manuscript that, he and his grandmother thought to be his, to Mani. Mani then says that the manuscript belongs to someone called Someshwaran. When he confines in his grandmother, he realizes that he has no relatives named Someshwaran and that there is only one retarded 10-year-old boy called Somu, in that street. Visalakshi asks Akash to leave all the things about manuscripts. His grandmother then hides the manuscript but Abhirami gives it to him secretly and he leaves for Chennai.

Somu and Akash's colleague, Ismail get into a quarrel when Ismail accidentally damages his bike. Somu then goes to Ismail's office, when Akash is also, to get compensation. He later finds Ismail dead in the toilet, with the church father being the last one to leave it. AC Adiyapatham then tries to arrest Somu as he is seen there. Kumaraguru brings Somu to his guesthouse, on Chennai's outskirts. Meanwhile, Thillairajan blindly starts trusting an astrologer who tells him that he would not see Aarthi again. Fearing that something would happen to Aarthi, he locks her inside their home and plans to get Somu and Aarthi married. Aarthi, in the name of helping Somu, escapes from her home, only to be kidnapped by an unknown person. In between all these, a guy called Manohar also dies. All the suspicion falls on Somu who flees.

Akash goes to Somu's home in the name of being Somu's friend but encounters Padmarajan and Somu's junior Chaaya there. They both realize that Akash is not Somu's friend and Akash goes back to Chidambaram. Meanwhile, Aarthi's case is being investigated by the same AC Adiyapatham. Adiyapatham suspects Somu to be the kidnapper as well. On the other hand, Somu starts to investigate on his own after realizing that all the people who have died so far, are people whom he has met.

Aarthi is injected with the blood of an AIDs patient, and her health starts deteriorating due to the HIV Virus. Somu is on the run. Meanwhile, Akash and Abhirami, without their knowledge of their grandmother, try to find out about Somu with the help of Mani, and Akash's computer knowledge(Binary Code). Somu finds out that a guy, who has a white scar on the back of his neck, has been committing the murders, as well as Aarthi's abduction.

Thillairajan, goes on his way to find a manuscript related to Aarthi, in the means of finding her. Somu is on the run, Aarthi is dying, Thillairajan is lost in love for his daughter and AC Adiyapatham is trying to crack the code, while murders continue to take place. Again, all of the victims are known by Somu. Thillairajan comes to Chidambaram as Chidambaram is most famous for its ragasiyam(secret) and nadi josiyam. He meets Mani who has the relevant manuscript to deduce Aarthi's life. But it turns out to be someone else's. But with Akash's help, they find Aarthi's real manuscript and Thillairajan gets heartbroken to find that Aarthi has AIDs.

After sometime, Somu comes to Chidambaram with the help of some transgender people who rescued him. He stays very near Akash's home. One day, the young boy Somu suddenly dies in Mani's residence. AC Adiyapatham investigates it Mani shifts to Visalakshi's home as his house is under investigation.

Aarthi is found outside her house by her mother, and is bed-ridden. Thillairajan is nowhere to be found. His assistant Doctor Mangaiyarkarasi takes care of Aarthi by visiting her home frequently. Kumaraguru, Thulasi and her husband Vishnu visit Aarthi. Thulasi accidentally blurts out that Aarthi has AIDs as she was in the same condition years ago. It is shown that Thulasi is a scientist in Germany who was finding a cure for HIV. As her theory was rejected, she injected herself with HIV Virus to prove it. The virus is arrested in her body, similar to Aarthi, and that is why, she is always talking weirdly. Soon, somehow, Somu is cleared of all charges and returns to Chennai. Before that, he reads some important files in Aarthi's computer and realizes that he had known everyone that has been killed, including the tanker lorry victim. That was not an accident and was a planned murder after all. The guy's name is actually Pazhani. Aarthi knows who is the reason behind it but is unable to communicate with Somu. Yet, she starts to recover.

AC Adiyapatham finds out the main culprit and the whole gang, much to Akash and Somu's shock. It is revealed to be Kumaraguru. Not only him but also, Padmarajan, Anbarasu, Mangaiyarkarasi, Prabhu(Somu's friend and studio owner) and Arumugam(the man with the white scar). Kumaraguru reveals that he used Somu to divert the police's suspicion, and he didn't murder anyone. And that too, Arumugam is only responsible for taking the victim's fingerprints. Still, Adiyapatham is skeptical about it. The whole lot is then arrested.

After sometime, Akash comes face to face with Abhirami's aunt, Kamakshi, the lady who was supposed to marry his father. He gets angry and reveals the truth about his life in America. His father and mother had a love marriage and even after Akash was born, Kamakshi sent a letter to his father. When his mother found out, she left them and moved on with another man. Depressed, his father drank a lot and died as a result of that. Visalakshi hears this and heartbroken that Akash hid it from her, doesn't talk to him after that.

Some others, including Mani comes and confess to the police that they are murderers, with Mani having accidentally killing Somu, his illegitimate son. A young girl Devi, also admits that she poisoned her father. It then slowly comes to light that Kumaraguru and his gang do not have any connection with the murders. Kumaraguru is released afterwards. Somu then finds out that the manuscripts of the dead consists of a medicine that cures AIDs. This was the reason that Arumugam, had been taking the fingerprints of the dead. Kumaraguru wanted to cure his daughter. The last manuscript that belongs to someone called Somu has the last ingredient but Kumaraguru finds out that the young boy Somu's one doesn't have the ingredient. It is after all, in his junior Somu's manuscript. Akash goes with Kumaraguru to help him with the 'binary code' found in Somu's manuscript. He decodes it as Thillai Tazhu, a type of plant. When Kumaraguru refuses to share it with Somu and tries to kill Akash, he flees the place with the manuscript. Afterwards, Adiyapatham dies after consuming the medicine when Kumaraguru does want to trade the secret with him. Kumaraguru returns and has a quarrel with Somu, who refuses to give his manuscript. Thillairajan loses his eyesight after the juice of the leaf drops into his eyes.

Kumaraguru comes back to request help from Somu, when he realizes that they are missing the second ingredient. Abhirami's father also realizes that the manuscripts have a cure for leukemia. When no one is looking, Kamakshi, to kill the pain and herself, drinks the incomplete medicine. Her leukemia is cured much to everyone's surprise. Somu gives the manuscript to Kumaraguru, after realizing that it is indeed medicine, but is incomplete. Late that night, Thillairajan asks Somu to read his manuscript in the hope to find the ingredient. Akash is still confident that it is binary code but Somu is skeptical about it. He decodes it and Thillairajan realizes that it is the blood of a relative.

He drips his blood under the moonlight which turns into something in golden colour. Here Aarthi's medicine is ready. But Kumaraguru hesitates to give blood as he has a fear of blood. When Vishnu forces him, Kumaraguru pushes him angering Thulasi. She kills her father and her medicine is ready after his blood drops on the incomplete one.

In an epilogue, it is shown that Thulasi is cured and returns to Germany with Vishnu and is awarded the cure for HIV. Aarthi, after consuming the medicine is cured as well and marries Somu and they have two children. Thillairajan's eyes sight is lost forever. Somu realizes that Kumaraguru had always seen him as a son and he had left Neithal Magazine in Somu's name. Akash marries Abhirami and stays in Chidambaram. He comes across Kumaraguru's pendrive and with details in it, starts predicting the future of Earth, such as robots taking over humans in the year 2050. Years later, Visalakshi dies after completing a number of rounds in the temple, as predicted by her father-in-law, not even talking to Akash once. Abhirami comes across Chaaya's letter for Somu, which she had given Akash on her visit to Chidambaram. It is not said what is in the letter and when Aarthi makes a fuss about it, Somu thinks about what sin he made in his previous birth(his first interview question at the beginning of the show). It is known that in their previous birth, Somu was a rich landlord and had cheated on Aarthi who happened to be his girlfriend. Aarthi vowed to stay with Somu for 7 births and the current life is their second birth. This was told by Mani to Akash while Mani was reading Somu's manuscript. As the Aarthi scolds Somu and with Somu thinking about it, the show ends.

== Cast ==
- Krishna as Someshwaran "Somu"
- Ranjith as Akash
- Swarna as Aarthi (Somu's friend)
- Y. Gee. Mahendra as Thillairajan (Aarthi's father)
- Mohan V. Ram as Kumaraguru / God (Somu's editor)
- Malavika Avinash/Devadarshini as Thulasi (Kumaraguru's daughter)
- Bombay Gnanam as Visalakshi (Akash's Paatti)
- Ashok as Arumugam
- Abirami Parkunam as Abirami (Akash's cousin)
- Arun as Mohammad Ismail (Akash's friend)
- Arunadevy as Dr. Mangaiyarkarasi (Thillairajan's junior)
- Gnanavel as Anbarasu (Nadi Jothidar)
- Kannan as Pirabu (studio owner)
- Nithya Ravindran as Sivagami (Aarthi's mother)
- Mohan Vaidya as Natesan Sarma (Archana's dance master)
- Shanmugam as Isaikki
- Saththiyamoorthy as 10Rs manithan
- Sureshwar as Padmarajan (Somu's friend)
- Ramachandran Mahalingam as Mani (Nadi Josiyar)
- Menon Bijoy as AC Aadiyapatham
- Viji Kannan as Nandhini (Somu's mother)
- S. Sathyendra
