= Marmadesam =

- Poster
- மர்மதேசம்
- Genre: Mystery; Thriller; Suspense; Drama; Soap opera
- Created by: Min Bimbangal
- Screenplay by: Indra Soundar Rajan (Ragasiyam, Vidathu Karuppu, Iyanthira Paravai, Edhuvum Nadakkum); C. J. Baskar (Sorna Reghai); Naga (Edhuvum Nadakkum); Dialogues; Indra Soundar Rajan (Ragasiyam, Vidathu Karuppu, Iyanthira Paravai, Edhuvum Nadakkum); C. J. Baskar (Sorna Reghai); Naga (Edhuvum Nadakkum)
- Story by: Indra Soundar Rajan (Ragasiyam, Vidathu Karuppu, Sorna Reghai, Iyanthira Paravai, Edhuvum Nadakkum); Theme; Naga (Edhuvum Nadakkum)
- Directed by: Naga (Ragasiyam, Vidathu Karuppu, Edhuvum Nadakkum); C. J. Baskar (Sorna Reghai, Iyanthira Paravai); Rajendra Kumar (Iyanthira Paravai)
- Theme music composer: Rehan (Ragasiyam, Vidathu Karuppu, Sorna Reghai, Iyanthira Paravai); Rajhesh Vaidhya (Edhuvum Nadakkum)
- Country of origin: India
- Original language: Tamil
- No. of seasons: 5
- No. of episodes: 204

Production
- Producers: B. Kailasam; Geetha B. Kailasam (Ragasiyam, Vidathu Karuppu, Sorna Reghai, Iyanthira Paravai, Edhuvum Nadakkum); Ashok Amritraj; Michael Jay Solomon (Ragasiyam)
- Cinematography: Naga (Ragasiyam, Vidathu Karuppu); Sakthi Saravanan (Sorna Regai, Iyanthira Paravai); Anand Babu (Vidathu Karuppu); Narayan Kumar (Edhuvum Nadakkum)
- Running time: 23-30 minutes
- Production companies: Min Bimbangal (Ragasiyam, Vidathu Karuppu, Sorna Reghai, Iyanthira Paravai, Edhuvum Nadakkum); Amritraj Solomon Communications (Ragasiyam)

Original release
- Network: Sun TV (1996-1998); Raj TV (1999-2001)
- Release: 5 January 1996 – 22 December 2001

Marmadesam (transl. Land of Mystery) was a 1996-2001 Tamil mystery anthology television series telecasted between 1996 and 1998 on Sun TV and then on Raj TV between 1999 and 2001 lasting 5 seasons.

From 2019, it started airing on YouTube from Monday to Saturday by Kavithalaya.

== Premise ==
The series consisted of 5 stand-alone stories dealing with supernatural and mystery occurrences. While the stories are purely fictitious, they explore to some extent the beliefs and real-life traditions of Tamilnadu.

Ragasiyam was set in both village and city.

Vidathu Karupu had a complete village setting.

Sorna Regai had a complete city setting.

Iyandira Paravai had both village and city setting.

Edhuvum Nadakkum was set in a forest.

The seasons are named:

- Ragasiyam (Tamil: ரகசியம்) (transl. The Secret) (fantasy thriller) (Director: Naga) Explores the legend of the mysterious healing powers of Nava-bhashana lingam. 73 Episodes.
- Vidāthu Karuppu (Tamil: விடாது கருப்பு) (transl. ( Karuppu ) Black Never Spares) (Psychological Thriller) (Director: Naga) Explores the legend of the Hindu village deity Karuppu Sami. PS: Karuppu Sami where., Karuppu means Black, Sami Means God. Its so called because the deity is black is colour. Karuppu Sami is considered as a god which protects the villages. Vidātha Karuppu means the god (Karuppu Sami) wont spares the one who make's mistakes. 82 Episodes.
- Sorna Reghai (Tamil: சொர்ண ரேகை) (transl. Golden palmlines) (crime thriller) (Director: C.J.Bhaskar) Explores the field of palmistry. 20 Episodes.
- Eyanthira Paravai (Tamil: இயந்திர பறவை) (transl. The Mechanical Bird) (crime thriller) (Director: C.J.Bhaskar) Explores the art of Varmakalai. 34 Episodes.
- Edhuvum Nadakkum (Tamil: எதுவும் நடக்கும்) (transl. Anything can happen) (fantasy horror) (Director: Naga) Explores the legend of Kalpaka-vriksham and environment as a living entity. 33 Episodes (the story is not complete as it was abandoned mid-way.)

== Plot ==
=== Ragasiyam ===
Ragasiyam is the first season of Marmadesam series. The story-line is about the mysterious healing powers of Navabhashanam Lingams of Lord Shiva.

The plot opens with a small fictional village named Chitharpatti, where a temple of Chitheswarar (also pronounced as Sitheshwarar) attracts a large number of devotees thanks to its legend as well as its purported power to heal any known or unknown disease. An ashram adjacent to the temple, headed by Oomaisaamy (Charuhasan) is also a popular name, as it cures literally any physically or mentally ill patient.

The temple is closed from 6 pm every evening until 6 am the following morning. It is believed that Siddhars enter the temple past its closure for the day, and perform their rituals and prayers and leave before dawn, and anyone who disturbs the prayers of the Siddhars is done away with by the guardian of the temple, Kaalabhairavar, who is believed to guard the temple during the night in the form of a dog. This belief attracts a number of rationalists to the temple, who want to try and solve the mystery. One such rationalist, a journalist names Srikanth (Indra Soundar Rajan), hides in the temple when it is being closed for the day, in an attempt to find out what really happens in the temple in the dark. However, as if the villagers' fear is made true, Srikanth is killed by a dog while he is inside the temple. Hence, the entire village is convinced that the temple of Chitheshwarar is actually a den of heavenly Siddhas who pray during the night, leaving ordinary people to pray during the day.

Srikanth's friend, Mani Sundaram (Ram G) is the young son of the temple's chief priest. He is a rationalist, who does not believe in myths and rituals. Instead, he chooses to rationalize his beliefs, and hence often ends up at odds with his father with regard to the temple's mysteries and rituals. One by one, four people are killed inside the temple, including a police inspector who is there to investigate the mystery. At this juncture, Dr. KR (Delhi Ganesh)—once a great psychiatrist, but now intellectually disabled—strays into the village, and is admitted to Oomaisaamy's ashram by Mani. Prasad (Prithviraj), Dr. KR's son, comes in search of him, and ends up being a guest to Mani and his sister Lalitha (Vasuki). As Mani and Prasad try to reveal the temple's mystery even more, they come to know that Dr. KR is actually acting as a fool, and he too is trying to do the same. But Dr. KR has personal intentions. He had been regarded as one of the best psychiatrists of India, and an Indian Central Minister admits his intellectually disabled son to his hospital for treatment. But Dr. KR is unable to cure the Minister's son even after giving his best for the patient. Enraged by this, the Minister ridicules Dr. KR and moves his son away to Oomaisaamy's ashram after hearing other people speak so highly about it. Dr. KR feels insulted and decides to find out how Oomaisaamy is able to cure patients so effortlessly in his ashram. To achieve this, he makes everyone believe he is foolish, and lands up in Oomaisaamy's ashram. What Dr. KR does not know, is that he was unable to cure the Minister's son not because of his incompetency, but because of a sinister scheme laid out by his junior, Dr. Vishwaram (Mohan V. Ram).

As Dr. KR acts as a fool and tries to uncover Chitharpatti's mystery, he stumbles upon a greater truth about what might be going on inside the temple during the dark. Dr. KR and Mani then decide to work together to find out the truth. Mani finds out that there are actually one or more persons entering the temple at night through a secret entrance to the temple, and exiting at dawn. In an attempt to find out what they are actually doing inside the temple, Mani hides in the temple one night. He finds out that the two men enter the temple with trained dogs searching for Navabhashana lingams, of which, he learns, they have six already and are trying to locate the remaining three. Mani finds out that these dogs were the ones that killed the four, and it was just the work of thugs and not God, as the villagers believe. Also, the two men seem to get instructions from someone inside the village, who knows and is capitalizing on the superstitious nature of the villagers.

Meanwhile, Prasad fall in love with lalitha (Vasuki), (sister of Sundaram) and they decide to marry. Mani is found hiding by these men, and a chase ensues where Mani, fighting for his life, kills the dogs, and forces the two men to leave the temple as stealthily as they arrived, and set the ball rolling for a police probe. Vaithiyar (Kavithalaya Krishnan), Mani's best friend in the village, turns out to be the man behind these killings inside the temple. As he is about to get caught, he escapes with the lingams he had already stolen, and sets off to Chennai with an accomplice. However, on the way, the accomplice is killed by a truck, which also chases Vaithiyar, but only manages to send him into a coma. The box containing the lingams is lost in the van Vaithiyar was driving, and finds its way to Chennai.

The rest of the story is a nail-biting chase for these lingams. In between this hunt for the Lingams, people who are involved in this case gets killed by a moving lorry. A guy, known as Guruji, is the reason behind all these crimes and the police tries to crack the code, to find the man. Mani on his own, tries to find him, with the help of his girlfriend, Devi (Nithya), who unfortunately gets killed by the lorry. Angered, Mani goes and meets Vaithiyar, who is acting as a fool, asking him to disclose who Guruji is. From him, Mani gets to know about a book, which had stated all the current happenings, and it was written 400 years ago. He also learns that the box containing the Lingams would find its way to his sister Lalitha. Shocking truth about many people that Mani believes, come to light, making him not to trust anyone around him except his sister and Rudrapathi (Poovilangu Mohan). Rudrapathi also gets killed by the truck. Finally, Mani becomes the one to find the Guruji, by keeping a letter pad on one above another and it is shown that guruji is none other than mani's two neighbors govindaraj and rangaraj. Govindaraj dies of heart attack and rangaraj is arrested. Also in various stages of the plot, the significance of these lingams, values of ancient Hindu scriptures are brought out, which makes the viewer intrigued until the last scene.

The last scene was made in a way to tell the viewers about human life and nature's significance. The people who died in the plot, by the lorry, comes to life to address the viewers. The actors declare that Marma Desam series would continue. Thus, telling the viewers about the second season of the series, Vidaathu Karuppu, which turned out to be the most successful of the whole Marma Desam series.

The novel version of this season is ரகசியமாக ஒரு ரகசியம்.

=== Vidaathu Karuppu ===
The second season was titled Vidaathu Karuppu. Vidathu Karuppu was the most successful of the Marmadesam series. The story examines the psychological underpinnings of the concept of split personalities even while exploring in detail the rural cult of Karuppu Sami prevalent in the southern part of Tamil Nadu. Starring Chetan,C. T. Rajakantham, Devadarshini, Meenakumari, Vijaya Sarathy, Master Lokesh, Mohan V. Ram, Poovilangu Mohan, Ponvannan, Sureshwar, Kausalya, Muthusubramanian and Sivakavitha, the series was a huge commercial success and triggered imitations and supernatural thrillers by other television directors.

Each episode was made of two parts—the first ten minutes of each 30-minute episode was set in the year 1970; the second part of each episode was set in 1995 and related to the events shown in the first part. While the first part revolved around the events of the Anaimudi Alampriyar household as seen through the eyes of the young Rajendran (played by Master Lokesh), the second part was mainly concerned with the customs, beliefs and traditions of the village and events unfolding in the Anaimudi Alampriyar household as seen through the eyes of the sceptical medical student Reena (Devadarshini) and her superstitious Chief Doctor, Nanda (Mohan V. Ram). The story begins with Reena's arrival in the village in the company of her colleague and best friend, Ratna, daughter of the village headman, Anaimudi Alampriyar, who seeks sanction from her village's guardian deity Karuppu Sami to marry her lover Aravind.

In Ratna's village, Reena and her boss learn about the cult of Karuppu Sami, the guardian deity and how Karuppu Sami punishes people who transgress his rules. While Reena's Chief believes it, due to him getting hold of some mysterious notebook with weird stuff and a sword which draws blood, every time it is taken out, Reena is skeptical about it. Eventually, they witness some mysterious and gruesome deaths. Simultaneously, the story of the Anaimudi's mother, the evil moneylender Pechi who indulges in usury is told as a flashback through the eyes of Anaimudi's son and Ratna's older brother, the extremely soft and timid Rajendran who is obsessed with legends of Karuppu Sami. Pechi murders one of her opponents and is eventually killed herself, the first in a string of mysterious deaths attributed to Karuppu Sami. A few days later, strange events and sightings take place in the Anaimudi household, prompting Anaimudi's family to conclude that the house is haunted by Pechi's ghost and move out.

Among the mysterious death (believed to be done by Karuppu Sami), is the hunt for some golden pot. Happened to be the jewels not only of Aanmai Udaiyar, but also the whole village. Every single one in the village had been looking for it, though some of the women try to avoid it extremely (thought that the gold is cursed due to the warth gained by Pechi). Aanmai Udaiyar and Ratna's Uncle, Brahmman are the two people in the whole village putting in the greatest effort to find the gold. Believing Pechi had hidden the gold and jewels in four golden pots and hid it in the village, they near it but miss them. Each time one of the pots is found, it is always empty. Taking it as a challenge and to win over Karuppu Sami, to prove to the villagers that no such deity is around, Reena starts to uncover it too.

Reena, anxious to know the identity of Karuppu Sami, investigates the murders and discovers that the haunting was a sham perpetuated by the village schoolteacher (played by Poovilangu Mohan) who held a grudge against the Anaimudi's family and orchestrated the haunting to drive them out of the house. But the schoolteacher vehemently denies that he had anything to do with the mysterious murders. Reena, then suspects the priest of the Karuppu Sami shrine in the village who frequently enters a state of trance during which he is possessed by Karuppu Sami and pronounces judgement. But Reena discovers that though the priest is genuinely possessed by the spirit of Karuppu Sami on occasion, he was not the killer. In her investigations, Reena is assisted by Rajendran who acts as her guide. Rajendran gradually falls in love with Reena.

Eventually, Rajendran proposes to Reena who rebuffs him questioning his masculinity. Shamed, Rajendran rapes Reena and absconds. That night, Reena discovers the murderer. When Rajendran, in the form of karuppu comes in search of Reena's rapist, Dr.Nandha points at his reflection in the water. Karuppu looks down into the reflection and realises that the sinner is within him and stabs himself. Reena later explains that Rajendran, due to a traumatic childhood experience, suffers from split personality disorder. The stories he was interested in turned him into the karuppu without him knowing. Reena then leaves for the city.

Later, a man finds Nanda dead and picks up the book in Nanda's hand. He finds his face on the book and takes it back to his hometown, implying that karuppu will return and will not rest until all evil is abolished in this town now.

The novel version of this season is Vittu Vidu Karuppa.

=== Sorna Reghai (Tamil: சொர்ண ரேகை) ===
It is a crime story based on palmistry, story revolves between honest police, criminal and Astrologer.

Anwar (Poovilangu Mohan) is a sincere police officer who lives with his bedridden Hindu father, Parthasarathy. He was adopted as a child by the Hindu Bhramin family. His adoptive parents had a girl a few years later and Anwar, jealous of the affection shown on his sister, intentionally loses her in a crowded street. His mother dies of grieve. Feeling guilty of his mistake, Anwar tries to find his sister though he knows that the chances are less. Anwar recently arrests a dangerous criminal, Muniratna (Thalaivasal Vijay) who did 16 murders and had hidden a box of gold somewhere. He is to be hanged in 2 days but Anwar gets to know from a Palmistry Astrologer, Bhaskar Das (Suresh Chakravarthy), that Muniratnam would not die and has a long life of 90 years. Anwar also occasionally gets dreams of meeting people and it ends with an exhaust fan. Anwar sees the people he saw in his dreams later that day or a few days later, with an exhaust fan nearby. He gets a vision of his friend dying in the jail as Muniratnam escapes and gets confused when the same happens.

Muniratnam escapes with the help of his men, in disguise as a Church Father, and hides in a poor Theater Operator, Lingam's house. He holds Lingam and his pregnant wife Kamala in hostage in their own house. Anwar tracks down the clues to Lingam's house but Muniratnam is nowhere to be found. Muniratnam is waiting for a message from his men and girlfriend but there is no response. In the meantime, Muniratnam's girlfriend, Manga is kidnapped by his men. It turned out that the men have felt betrayed by Muniratnam and find the gold and kill him in the end.

It turns out that Bhaskar Das is Lingam's younger brother and he is also held captive by Muniratnam. It is revealed in the end that Bhaskar Das is the one who initiated Muniratnam's escape and he was after the gold as well. Anwar finds out that Lingam's wife is his long lost sister, Thamarai. In the end, Muniratnam, his friend, Bhaskar Das, Lingam, his wife and Anwar's friend Ravi dies. The box of gold is safely stored in the theater where Lingam works, by Bhaskar Das as he earned Muniratnam's trust and Muniratnam told him the place where it is hidden. Anwar never gets to know about the gold. In the end, the gold finds its way to the hands of Meenakshi, the theater owner's daughter and her boyfriend, Thirunavukarasu, as they leave the city in order to get married, as Thirunavukarasu's mother asks high amount of dowry from Meenakshi's father.

=== Iyanthira Paravai (Tamil: இயந்திர பறவை) ===
It is a crime story based on the Varma kalai, which is using to kill the people. The culprit also using the boomerang to kill the people and it will knock the varma point of the human body to kill the people. A lady doctor identifies the murder which was done by Varma Kalai and she informs CB-CID police officer / Inspector Anwar (Poovilangu Mohan) about it.

Anwar starts to find the culprit with the help of News Tv9 Channel Reporter Charu Latha, who also got aware about the murder before it happens. The Aasaan (varma kalai Teacher) runs a Varma Kalai School, generation by generation at the Aandavar vanam and he lives with his Wife and two sons Kasi (Chetan) and Valari (Gowtham Sundararajan). The Aandavar vanam shows some unbelievable mysteries and it has some hidden facts on behalf of the Varma Kalai. The whole murder is targeted to the people who are very close to S.V.S (Ravikumar) and Kumarasammy (Subalekha Sudhakar) in order to create shadow war between them.

Unknowingly, the TV reporter reveal the Shadow war between the S.V.S and Kumarasammy and the Kumarasammy tries to hide the war between them. Kumarassammy and M.P Ponnampalam runs some illegal business connecting with the Information City. Meanwhile, Kumarasammy 's daughter gets killed by the culprit who object the information city project and S.V.S tries to calm down Kumarasammy and he says that he will not kill Kumarasammys' daughter. The TV9 Reporter also tries to find out the mysteries on the Aandavar Vanam and consequently she gets chased by the Aasan and his sons. Therefore, the reporter suspect Aasan and tells it to Anwar and Kumarasammy, who both neglect her statement. Due to the funeral rites of Kumarasammy's daughter, the TV9 reporter Charu telecasts all the evidences collected by her about the shadow war between the S.V.S and Kumarasammy and Aandavar vanam. Afterward she gets fired by Kumarasammy (TV9 Chairmen) and she joins in a new channel.

However, S.V.S gets killed by Aasan and Kumarasammy came to the spot and they are arrested by police under the doubt, also M.P Ponnampalam (venu arvind) tries to give bail to them, which is rejected by Anwar. Meanwhile, both of them are released by Court and Charu suspects Anwar, too. Finally Anwer finds the culprit, the motive of the murders, culprits' scope and reveals the Aandevar vanams' Mysteries to charu too. Meanwhile, the right hand of culprit gets killed by Aasan using Varma Kalai along with a boomerang to save the Varma Kalai.

=== Edhuvum Nadakkum (Anything Can Happen) ===
'Edhuvum Nadakkum' which explores the legend of the Kalpa vriksham tree and environment as a living entity. Thanumalayakkudi is a small tribal settlement (fictional) in a jungle in the interior of South India. Strict inter-clan codes and beliefs bind the members of the tribe. They do not accept money in exchange for their produce of chiefly honey and fruits; they are ready to barter them. In this tribal settlement, there exists a myth that the Kalpavriksham, the celestial tree that can grant any wish and desire of the person standing underneath it, is situated somewhere in the forest. Strangers to the area who go in search of this tree are lost in the forest. To this forest come Sivagurunathan, a divisional forest officer and his brother Natarajan, a wildlife filmmaker and a visiting lecturer of the film and TV institute. Witnesses to the miracles and mysteries of the forest, they are lost in the jungle in pursuit of the Kalpavriksham. It is believed that they are killed in the pursuit of this sacred tree. Siddharth, a student of Natarajan and an aspiring filmmaker, comes to the settlement along with Varsha a sound recordist to make a film on the forest and its wildlife. As the duo learn about the mysteries of the place, they smell something fishy in the alleged deaths of Sivagurunathan and Natarajan. This serial was stopped by the makers for unknown reasons. The plot does not continue. The secret is untold.

There seems to be talks to revisit this season since it's left unfinished as per an interview (in 2019) by the director Naga.

== Cast ==
=== Ragasiyam ===
- Prithveeraj as Prasad
- Delhi Ganesh as Dr. K. R., psychologist and Prasad's father
- Vasuki Anand as Lalitha Sundaram, daughter of Siddharpatti temple priest and fiancee of Prasad
- Ram G as Mani Sundaram, son of Siddharpatti temple priest
- Charuhasan as the mute Siddhar (Oomaisami)
- Kavithalaya Krishnan as "Vaidyar" Ramarathinam
- Sadhasivam as Sundaram Pattar, Siddharpatti temple priest
- Poovilangu Mohan as CB-CID officer Rudrapathi.
- R. N. K. Prasad as Guovindarajan G.
- R. N. Sudarshan as Rungarajan G.
- Mohan Raman as Dr. Vishwaram, K.R.'s Junior
- M.Bhanumathi as servant
- Indra Soundar Rajan as writer Srikanth
- Muthu Subramaniam as Namboothiri
- TKS Chandran as Vairavan Chettiyar
- NaliniKanth as Annamalai
- Mohanapriya as Amsavalli
- Subhalekha Sudhakar as Agniraasu
- Ramachandran Mahalingam as Constable Manickam
- Nithya as Sridevi (Srikanth's sister & Mani's Girlfriend)
- Maarthandan as Anthony Muthu
- Ajay Rathnam as CBCID officer Raghu succeeding the deceased Rudrapathi.
- Idichapuli Selvaraj as Grocery shop owner Perumal Chetty
- Benjamin as worker in Perumal Chetty's Grocery shop
- Mayilsamy as Santhana Krishnan who works at K.R. Hospital
- Mounika as assistant doctor who works at K.R. Hospital
- Cheenu Mohan as parcel service driver
- Ashok as Lawrence

=== Vidaadhu Karuppu ===
- Chetan as Rajendran
  - Lokesh Rajendran as the young Rajendran.
- Devadarshini as Dr. Reena
- C. T. Rajakantham as Pechi Nachiyar (Pechi Kizhavi) [Dr.Rathna's Grandmother]
- K. K. Soundar as Kuthiraikaara Paranthaaman
- Sadhasivam as Aanaimudi Alampiriyar (Pechi's elder son)
- Ramachandran Mahalingam as Kattaiyan (Pechi's younger son)
- Poovilangu Mohan as Vathiyar Varadharajan / Kasi
- Shobana as Valli Nachiyar [Dr.Rathna's mother]
- Sivakavitha as Sivagami [Brahmman's wife / Anaimudiyar's younger sister]
- Ponvannan as Bramman (Aanaimudiyar's brother-in-law)
- Muthu Subramaniam as Ganapathi Ambalam,Karuppu Temple Poosari
- Meenakumari as Dr.Rathna (Rajendran's younger sister)
- Mohan Raman as Dr.Nandha
- Vijayasarathy as Dr.Aravind [Rathna's boyfriend]
- Sureshwar as Shanmugham (Vathiyar Varadharajan's son)
- Kausalya as Lakshmi (Dr.Rathna's younger sister)
- Kavitha Tinku as Selli (Rajendran's fiancée)
- Muthu Subramaniam as Ibrahim Rowther (Vaithiyar)
- Vijay Anand as Gopal
- Ajay Rathnam as Karuppuswamy
- Mahima Devi as Rasathi (Kuthiraikaara Paranthaman's daughter)
- Benjamin as Mottaiyan
- Maarthandan as Oomaiyan (Ashokan)
- Udayaraj as Mittai Mani
- Vichu Viswanath as Veerabhaghu

=== Sorna Reghai ===
- Poovilangu Mohan as police inspector Anwar
- Delhi Ganesh as astrologer and Anwar's foster-father Chakravarthy
- Vishwa as Thirunaavukarasu
- Bhargavi Mani as Thirunavukarasu's lover Meenakshi
- R. Sundaramoorthy as Meenakshi's father
- Thalaivasal Vijay as Munirathinam
- Suresh Chakravarthy as Bhaskar Das
- Vaasan as Ravi
- Cheenu Mohan as Bhaskar Das's brother
- O.A.K. Sundar as smuggler
- Ramachandran as Palani
- Mahima Devi as Manga (Munirathinam's lover)
- Bharathi as Kamala, Anwar's sister

=== Iyanthira Paravai ===
- Poovilangu Mohan as police inspector Anwar
- Ravikumar as S.V.S (Industrialist and horse owner)
- Subhalekha Sudhakar as Kumaarasamy Tv9 Channel Owner
- Muthu Subramaniam as Narayanasaamy Aasaan
- Venu Arvind as MP Ponnambalam
- Chetan as Kasinathan the Foster son of Aasaan
- Gowtham Sundararajan as Valarinathan, son of Aasaan
- Siva Shree as child Parvathy (Anwar's sister's daughter)
- Vijayasarathy as Tv9 Channel Cameraman Balu
- Sri Priya Mahalakshmi as Doctor Vidhya
- Revathi Sankaran as Servant in Anwar's house
- Rajasekhar as GK
- Vincent Roy as Kolappan
- Raji as Charulatha
- Madurai Rajamani as vidhya's father
- Nithya Ravindar as vidhya's sister
- Sreenivasan as Sreenivasan

=== Edhuvum Nadakkum ===
- Sureshwar as Naadi Muthu
- Mohan Vaidya as Nataraj (a) Natti
- Poovilangu Mohan as Moopar
- Devadarshini as Varsha
- Ponvannan as forest officer Sadasivam.
- Subhalekha Sudhakar as Rangachari
- Shyalaja Chetlur as Vetha, Rangachari's wife
- Vijayasarathy as Siddharth student of the wildlife filmmaker Natarajan
- Ramachandran as Irusan
- Samuthirakani as a tribal (Episode 1)
- TKS Chandiran as one of the vaanathu manidhargal
- Sadasivam as one of the vaanathu manidhargal
- Sreenivasan as one of the vaanathu manidhargal
- Muthu Subramaniam as one of the vaanathu manidhargal
- Benjamin as Forester Govindan
- Kavi as Sadasivam's daughter

== Production ==
Naga, who earlier worked as cinematographer for serials directed by K. Balachander made his directorial debut with this series. Naga cited it was Balachander's son Kailasam who wanted him to direct when he initially assumed that he was roped in to handle cinematography.

=== Ragasiyam ===
Makers adapted the book Ragasiyamaga Oru Ragasiyam written by Indira for their first season Ragasiyam. Since the content was not enough for more than 26 episodes, Naga wrote additional 26 episodes with him writing urban part adding lorry as a main character. For the characters, Naga cast many popular actors in different characters which according to him, "made the audience more aware of each character's presence in the show". Delhi Ganesh who usually portrayed a cook in films appeared as high-profile psychiatrist while Subalekha Sudhakar who usually portrayed sacrificing brother was roped in to play a village gangster.

=== Vidathu Karuppu ===
For Vidathu Karuppu, Naga adapted Indira's other book Vittu Vidu Karuppa which according to writer Indira was germinated from a real-life event where the dreaded gangster who was feared by everyone had the fear and respect for deity Karuppana Samy. Naga cast different actors for Vidathu Karuppu since "the audience has to decipher everyone's character based on their background story." Chetan was cast as Rajendran based on his "features and soft-spoken nature". Devadarshini was chosen to play important character after Naga saw her anchoring in a television show.

Naga revealed that "each actor's first half of the face (from the forehead to the nose) or the second half (from the nose to the chin) would match that of the actor who would play their parent's role". For that Sureshwar was chosen to play Poovilangu Mohan's son to match his height.

== Broadcast ==
From 1996 to 1998, The first 2 seasons of the series were aired in Sun TV. From 1999 to 2001, The later 3 seasons of the series were later shifted to Raj TV. In 2015, The series was later re-telecasted in Vasanth TV. In 2020 during the corona virus pandemic, it was re-telecasted in Sun TV.

== Reception ==
Marmadesam was an extremely successful tele-serial. It was ranked first in viewership among the television programmes telecast from Chennai in 1997.

Ranjanai Krishnakumar of Firstpost praised Vidathu Karuppu that it "has aged remarkably well, never once making me cringe so far. The mystery is just as riveting as I remember it. The foreboding is a delight to discover. For those of us who know the ending, re-watching the show makes the clues obvious".

== Home media ==
=== Streaming ===
The digital rights of the show was initially with Rajshri Tamil channel. In 2019, Kavithalayaa announced that all the seasons of Marmadesam will be released in their own YouTube channel. The show became available on Kavithalayaa's own YouTube channel from August 2019. The show is currently being streaming on Vision Time YouTube Channel.

=== DVD ===
The first part of the serial, Ragasiyam, was released on DVD as a 5-disc region-free set in 2011 by Swathi Soft Solutions, Chennai.

== Remake ==
The first series of Marmadesam, Ragasiyam, was remade in Hindi with 2 seasons on Star Bharat under the name Kaal Bhairav Rahasya with significant changes in the storyline and was shot in Bhopal.

The second series of Marmadesam, Vidhaata Karappu, was remade in Telugu with a 60 episode series currently streaming on ZEE5 under the name Veerabhadruni Rahasyam with significant changes in the storyline and was shot in Godavari districts, Andhra Pradesh.
