= Nandi Awards of 2013 =

Indian Telugu film and TV awards ceremony

The Nandi Awards (నంది బహుమతులు) for the year 2013 were announced by Andhra Pradesh Government on 1 March 2017.

== Winners list ==
Category	Winner	Film	Award
Best Feature Film	V. Vamsi Krishna Reddy, Pramod Uppalapati	Mirchi	Gold
Second Best Feature Film	Sunitha Krishnan, M. S. Rajesh	Naa Bangaaru Talli	Silver
Third Best Feature Film	Nagarjuna	Uyyala Jampala	Bronze
Nandi Award for Best Popular Feature Film	B. V. S. N. Prasad	Attarintiki Daredi	Gold
Nandi Award for Akkineni Award for Best Home-viewing Feature Film	Dil Raju	Seethamma Vakitlo Sirimalle Chettu	Silver
Sarojini Devi Award for a Film on National Integration	Neelima Tirumalasetti	Alias Janaki	Gold
Best Director	Daya Kodavaganti	Alias Janaki	Silver
Best First Film of a Director	Koratala Siva	Mirchi	Silver
Best Actor	Prabhas	Mirchi	Silver
Best Actress	Anjali Patil	Naa Bangaaru Talli	Silver
Best Villain	Sampath Raj	Mirchi	Copper
Best Male Comedian	Thagubothu Ramesh	Venkatadri Express	Copper
Best Supporting Actor	Prakash Raj	Seethamma Vakitlo Sirimalle Chettu	Copper
Best Supporting Actress	Nadhiya	Attarintiki Daredi	Copper
Best Screenplay Writer	Merlapaka Gandhi	Venkatadri Express	Copper
Best Story Writer	Mohan Krishna Indraganti	Anthaka Mundu Aa Tarvatha	Copper
Best Dialogue Writer	Trivikram Srinivas	Attarintiki Daredi	Copper
Best Music Director	Devi Sri Prasad	Attarintiki Daredi	Copper
Best Lyricist	Sirivennela Seetharama Sastry	Seethamma Vakitlo Sirimalle Chettu	Copper
Best Cinematographer	S. Murali Mohan Reddy	Kamalatho Naa Prayanam	Copper
Best Male Playback Singer	Kailash Kher	Mirchi	Copper
Best Female Playback Singer	Kalpana Raghavendar	Intinta Annamayya	Copper
Best Editor	Prawin Pudi	Kaalicharan	Copper
Best Art Director	A.S. Prakash	Mirchi	Copper
Best Choreographer	Sekhar	Gunde Jaari Gallanthayyinde	Copper
Best Audiographer	Radhakrishna Eskala	Basanti	Copper
Best Costume Designer	Thirumala	Jagadguru Adi Shankara	Copper
Best Makeup Artist	Sivakumar	Jagadguru Adi Shankara	Copper
Best Fight Master	Venkata Nag	Kaalicharan	Copper
Best Male Dubbing Artist	P. Ravi Shankar	Attarintiki Daredi	Copper
Best Female Dubbing Artist	Mytra Varuna Mahi	Uyyala Jampala	Copper
Best Special Effects	Yathi Raj	Sahasam	Copper
Special Jury Award	Siddique	Naa Bangaaru Talli	Copper
Special Jury Award	Chaitanya Krishna	Kaalicharan	Copper
Special Jury Award	Anjali	Seethamma Vakitlo Sirimalle Chettu	Copper
Special Jury Award	Ramya Sri	O Malli	Copper
Special Jury Award	Kalki Mitra	Yugamali	Copper
Nandi Award for Best Book on Telugu Cinema(Books, posters, etc.)	Dr. Paidipala	Dr. Paidipala Telugu Cine Geya Kavula Charitra	Copper
Best Film Critic on Telugu Cinema	Chakravarthy		Copper
