= Devara: Part 1 =

2024 Indian film by Koratala Siva

- Theatrical release poster
- Directed by: Koratala Siva
- Written by: Koratala Siva
- Produced by: Sudhakar Mikkilineni; Kosaraju Harikrishna; Nandamuri Kalyan Ram
- Starring: N. T. Rama Rao Jr.; Saif Ali Khan; Janhvi Kapoor; Prakash Raj; Srikanth; Shine Tom Chacko
- Cinematography: R. Rathnavelu
- Edited by: A. Sreekar Prasad
- Music by: Anirudh Ravichander
- Production companies: N. T. R. Arts; Yuvasudha Arts
- Distributed by: see below
- Release date: 27 September 2024
- Running time: 178 minutes
- Country: India
- Language: Telugu
- Budget: est. ₹250–300 crore (Note: Multiple references:)
- Box office: est. ₹380–521 crore (Note: Devara's reported worldwide grosses vary between ₹380 crore (Box Office India) – ₹420 crore (DNA India) – ₹509 crore (Business Standard) – ₹521 crore (Bollywood Hungama))

Devara: Part 1 is a 2024 Indian Telugu-language action drama film written and directed by Koratala Siva. It is produced by Yuvasudha Arts and N. T. R. Arts. The film stars N. T. Rama Rao Jr. in dual roles, alongside Saif Ali Khan, Janhvi Kapoor, Prakash Raj, Srikanth and Shine Tom Chacko. It is the first part of a planned duology and marks the Telugu film debut of Khan and Kapoor. The film follows Devara, chieftain of a coastal village, who feuds with his counterpart Bhaira over arms smuggling through the Red Sea.

The film was officially announced in April 2021 under the tentative title NTR30, signifying Rama Rao's 30th appearance as a lead actor, and the official title was announced in May 2023. In late-2023, the film was split into two-parts. Principal photography for this part commenced in April 2023 and wrapped in August 2024. Filming took place in Hyderabad, Shamshabad, Visakhapatnam, Goa and Thailand. The film has music composed by Anirudh Ravichander, cinematography handled by R. Rathnavelu and editing by A. Sreekar Prasad.

Devara: Part 1 released worldwide on 27 September 2024 in standard, IMAX, 4DX, ScreenX, D-Box and PVR ICE formats to mixed reviews from critics and audiences alike. Despite this, it grossed ₹140–172 crore worldwide on its opening day, making it the Rama Rao's second biggest opener to date. and was a commercial success grossing ₹380–521 crore on a budget of ₹250–300 crore, making it the second biggest opener of 2024, third highest-grossing Telugu film of 2024, fifth highest-grossing Indian film of the 2024 and the eighth highest-grossing Telugu film of all time. The film went on to win SIIMA Awards for Best Cinematography, Best Playback Singer (Female), and Best Lyricist.

== Plot ==
In 1996, a high-level meeting is held concerning security threats to the 1996 Cricket World Cup in India from arms dealer Daya and his brother, Yethi.

The police capture Yethi's henchman and interrogate him. They learn Yethi was going to see Muruga, a smuggler in the Ratnagiri mountains. Going undercover as smugglers, the police led by Officer Shivam head to Ratnagiri to find Yethi. They approach DSP Tulasi, who tells them that Muruga is dead, and to visit the Red Sea villages. They visit Bhaira, chief of one of the villages, and threaten him to smuggle goods, only to be violently rejected by him. They find Singappa, who takes them offshore in a boat. Shivam tries to make an offer to him by showing off a diamond ring which is abruptly thrown into the sea by Singappa. As Shivam dives in to retrieve the ring, he finds human skeletons on the seabed, terrifying him. Singappa starts narrating the story which begins 12 years earlier.

In 1984, the villagers are smugglers in the night, bringing cargo for Muruga from the merchant ships. Devara, the chieftain of one of the villages, is one of the smuggling leaders, along with Bhaira. Unbeknownst to them, the cargo is illegal arms which are used in robberies, and one such incident occurs near their villages. During a smuggling expedition, they are caught by the coast guard and the commander of the vessel, Irfan, reveals the items they were smuggling, which indirectly led to the death of one of Devara's villagers.

Devara has a change of heart and decides to cease their smuggling operations, which is not liked by the other chieftains, including Bhaira. They hatch plans to kill him but fail. Devara stops the villagers from entering the seas for smuggling. He disappears after an attempt on his life and leaves a warning that he would continue to stop those who venture into the sea for smuggling. Years pass, and everyone adopts fishing to earn their livelihood as Devara stops those smuggling, while remaining invisible to the villagers. His son, Vara, grows up to be timid and soft-spoken, unlike his father, and tells the women in his family that Devara abandoned them. Vara's childhood friend, Thangam, is in love with him, but wishes he was more like Devara.

On the other hand, Bhaira trains a private army to kill Devara. Tulasi and Muruga again offer an opportunity to Bhaira to smuggle for them along with killing Devara, the biggest thorn in their operations. When Bhaira's men harass Vara's sister, he beats them up in a drunken fury. The following morning, he is accused of killing one of the men, but Vara pleads to Bhaira that he is not responsible. Bhaira tells him to prove it by joining the smuggling operation with his men. He later reveals that he killed his own injured man to get Vara to join them so that he can draw out Devara at sea.

Meanwhile, Devara's wife learns of the smuggling operation and asks Singappa to stop Vara, or Devara will kill him. However, Singappa reveals that Devara has been long dead, and the person who has been attacking the smugglers is actually Vara. He built a facade and story so that everyone would think that Devara is still alive. Meanwhile, Vara attacks Bhaira's men at sea and brings the injured men back to the shore. To instill even more fear in the villagers, Vara also injures himself, in front of Singappa and Devara's loyal aides, as he "went against his father".

When Shivam asks Singappa about Devara's killer, a flashback reveals that he was killed by Vara on the day he supposedly disappeared.

== Cast ==
- N. T. Rama Rao Jr. in dual roles as
  - Devara
  - Vara, Devara's son
    - Pratyush as young Vara
- Saif Ali Khan as Bhaira (voice dubbed by P. Ravi Shankar)
- Janhvi Kapoor as Thangam (voice dubbed by RJ Swetha), Vara's love interest
- Prakash Raj as Singappa
- Srikanth as Rayappa, Thangam's father
- Murali Sharma as Muruga, politician-cum-smuggler
- Abhimanyu Singh as DSP Tulasi IPS
- Ajay as Task Force Chief Shivam
- Narain as Irfan, Eastern Regional Officer of the Indian Coast Guard
- Kalaiyarasan as Kunjara, Kora's brother
- Shine Tom Chacko as Kora
- Shruti Marathe as Devara's wife and Vara's mother
- Talluri Rameswari as Jogula
- Zarina Wahab as Devara's mother and Vara's grandmother
- Zakir Hussain as the Home Minister of India
- Mathew Varghese as assistant of the Home Minister of India
- Micky Makhija as the Maharashtra DGP Radhan
- Mani Chandana as Rayappa's wife and Thangam's mother
- Shanoor Sana as Kunjara's wife
- Chaitra Rai as Bhaira's wife
- Himaja as Valli, Thangam's friend and Srinu's love interest
- Hari Teja as Thangam's friend
- Getup Srinu as Mettha Srinu, Vara's friend
- Rupa Lakshmi as Ademma
- Alapati Lakhsmi
- Mansi Varma as Uma, Devara's daughter and Vara's sister
- Princy George as Padma, Rayappa's blind sister
- Rekha Nirosha as Thangam's friend
- Bindu Bhargavi as Thangam's friend
- Eeshwar Reddy Gayam
- Rohan Surya Kanuma Reddy as Vara's friend
- Nihal Kodhaty as Bhaira's gang member
- Sudev Nair as Samara, Kunjara's son
- Tarak Ponnappa as Pasura, Bhaira's son
- Nareshraj Narasimha as Bhaira's gang member
- Sonakshi Verma as Rane's girlfriend
- Latha Viswanath Reddy as Chandrakala
- Temper Vamsi as Rane

== Production ==
=== Development ===
In February 2020, N. T. Rama Rao Jr and Trivikram Srinivas were reported to be collaborating on a second film, following Aravinda Sametha Veera Raghava (2018), tentatively titled NTR30. The film was to be produced by S. Radha Krishna and Nandamuri Kalyan Ram under the banners of Haarika & Hassine Creations and N. T. R. Arts. Later that July, Koratala Siva announced another project, AA21, with Allu Arjun in the lead, to be produced by former distributor Sudhakar Mikkilineni's newly launched production studio, Yuvasudha Arts. However, neither project materialised. (Note: Although Siva assured that the film would begin production in April 2022, post the completion of NTR30, Allu Arjun's commitments to Pushpa: The Rise (2021)—originally started as a single film which was later split into two parts with the second instalment shot back-to-back—meant that Arjun had to continue with the same look for both films and could not change his makeover for other projects. This led to Siva eventually shelving the project.) In April 2021, it was reported that Rama Rao and Siva would collaborate on NTR30, marking their second collaboration after Janatha Garage (2016). The film was officially announced on Ugadi (13 April 2021) with Yuvasudha Arts producing the film in collaboration with N. T. R. Arts. However, production was delayed due to Siva's commitments to Acharya and Rama Rao's to RRR.

Siva described it as a "large-scale project that has more commercial appeal" in comparison to his debut film Mirchi (2013). Following the box-office failure of Acharya, Siva wanted to fine-tune the script making necessary changes before finalising it as a draft, which delayed the commencement of filming throughout late 2022. By November, Siva started the pre-production works of the film with production set to begin in early 2023.

Initially set to begin production on 24 February, work on the project was delayed due to the death of Taraka Ratna as well as Rama Rao's participation in the Academy Awards campaign for RRR. The film was officially launched on 23 March with a puja ceremony held in Hyderabad with the presence of the cast and crew and S. S. Rajamouli preceding with the muhurtam shot. The film's title Devara was officially announced on 19 May 2023, the eve of Rama Rao's birthday. On 4 October, Siva announced that the film would be split into two parts.

=== Casting ===
The technical crew consist of musician Anirudh Ravichander, cinematographer R. Rathnavelu, editor A. Sreekar Prasad, production designer Sabu Cyril, stunt choreographer Kenny Bates and visual effects supervisors Brad Minnich and Yugandhar T. Alia Bhatt, Shraddha Kapoor, Mrunal Thakur and Rashmika Mandanna were considered to play the female lead, but turned down the offer. Janhvi Kapoor was confirmed to play the lead female role, in her first South Indian film. At the India Today Conclave, Janhvi described it as a "dream come true" moment on working with Rama Rao as she recalled on how she manifested her debut in South industry through Rama Rao's film in her past interviews. In April 2023, Saif Ali Khan was signed as an antagonist, marking his debut in Telugu cinema. Khan stated that speaking a new language for the film was challenging for him, and he did feel like a “newcomer”.

Prakash Raj and Meera Jasmine participated at the launch ceremony, thereby being part of the film. In May 2023, further supporting cast members joined the film with Mani Chandana and Tarak Ponnappa being part of the sets. In June 2023, it was announced that Shine Tom Chacko was cast in the film. Kalaiyarasan, Narain, Murali Sharma and Abhimanyu Singh also joined the cast after filming few preliminary sequences. In February 2024, reports surfaced stating that Shruti Marathe, a Marathi actress, had been chosen to star alongside Jr NTR. Shruti confirmed this during an interview with the Marathi Star Media portal. Siva later revealed that he chose Shruti as Devara's wife as he didn't want an actress to look like a second heroine in the film. He further added that he had been searching for an actress who complemented Devara's personality and he clarified that if he had cast any reputed actor then perhaps their image would have sidelined the role.

=== Filming ===
Principal photography commenced on 1 April 2023 in Hyderabad, with Rama Rao in attendance, while Janhvi and Khan joined the sets in mid April. In mid-May, the team took a two-week break following Rama Rao's departure for a family vacation. Filming resumed on 7 June 2023 with few crucial sequences between Rama Rao, Khan and other cast members being shot there and was completed in 14 days. Several action sequences had been shot in this schedule, including one which has been filmed in extreme low light. The team then took a brief month-long break, before resuming on 31 July 2023, to shoot an underwater action sequence. Rama Rao trained with expert swimmers from Mumbai for this particular schedule. In September, some of the sequences were shot at a specially constructed beach set in Shamshabad.

On 4 October 2023, the makers filmed the underwater action sequence at Hyderabad which would conclude the schedule post-completion. Janhvi completed filming for her portions on 1 November. The team then took a break to celebrate Diwali (12 November 2023) and resumed filming two days later for another brief schedule. The Goa schedule was completed by 20 November and the team returned to Hyderabad for another brief schedule which was filmed during mid-December. Kalyan Ram revealed that 80% of the film's shooting had been completed by late-December 2023, and filming would be wrapped by January 2024. However, at the end of the month, the production team revealed that 30 per cent of the film's shoot is to be completed.

In mid-March 2024, the team moved to Goa for filming a song sequence with Rama Rao and Janhvi. Following a short break, the team filmed a concurrent schedule in May 2024 at Visakhapatnam where Khan's portions were filmed. Rama Rao was not present in that schedule as he was filming for War 2 (2025) in Mumbai. In mid-June, the team shot an action sequence set in a forest in Goa featuring Rama Rao and Khan. In the same month, the team moved to Krabi, Thailand for filming a romantic song featuring Rama Rao and Jhanvi ("Chuttamalle") which was choreographed by Bosco Martis. In July 2024, the team filmed another schedule in Shamshabad. Due to multiple leaks throughout the production, the portions were filmed inside closed sets with the crew members restricted from using phones throughout the schedule. In mid-August 2024, a song titled "Aayudha Puja" was filmed in sets. On 14 August 2024, Rama Rao announced that he had completed filming his portions for the film.

In an interaction with Sandeep Reddy Vanga, Rama Rao added that he initially planned to shoot the underwater sequences at one of the biggest pools in Kapoli, but for reasons unknown they decided to set up a pool in the studio where they would predominantly shoot the action sequences. The team constructed a 20-foot water tank, dug five feet with 200 x 150 feet dimensions, in which they shot most of the action sequences for 30–35 days. He added, "We had these big diggers which came in and created artificial waves. We had wave machines. We have motorboats, motors fixed into the water to give small ripples in the pool. There was a pool and there was a water tank as well. So, it was very high on action."

=== Post-production ===
The visual effects were handled by Kalyan Ram's visual effects company, Advaitha Creative Works, along with Annapurna Studios, Digital Domain, Stealthworks Taiwan, NXT VFX, NY VFXWaala, Alzahra VFX, Phantom FX, Studio51, Firebolt Entertainment, Maskman Studio, Oscar VFX, DNEG, and Redefine VFX; Yugandhar T. and Brad Minnich served as the visual effects supervisors. As the film relied heavily on visual effects, Kalyan Ram researched extensively on enhancing the computer graphics and effects for nearly eight months, detailing on specific sequences that need VFX and real elements, respectively. To achieve this, the VFX team storyboarded the particular shots which demanded VFX. Sequences that demanded visual effects were filmed earlier so that the team could work on them within a four-month duration, and the process was supervised by international companies. Dubbing for the film began simultaneously in July 2024. According to cinematographer Rathnavelu, the film featured 3000 CG shots.

The initial runtime of the film was 190 minutes. It was sent to the Central Board of Film Certification (CBFC) on 12 September 2024, where it received U/A certificate. The censor board demanded four cuts for the film where a character kicking his wife, another character kicking his mother being modified, a five-second shot of a character hanging through a sword and then sliding down through it had been removed, and a scene with Rama Rao's character riding a shark in the sea was modified. With the exclusion of those sequences, the final runtime was revealed to be around 170 minutes.

== Music ==
The film's soundtrack album and background score were composed by Anirudh Ravichander in his fourth Telugu project after Agnyaathavaasi (2018), Jersey (2019), and Nani's Gang Leader (2019).

The first single, titled "Fear Song" was released on 19 May 2024. The second single titled "Chuttamalle" was released on 5 August 2024. The third single titled "Daavudi" was released on 4 September 2024. The fourth single, titled "Ayudha Pooja" was released on 26 September 2024 along with the full soundtrack album.

== Marketing ==
On 8 January 2024, the makers unveiled a glimpse into the film through social media platforms. Another glimpse that revealed Khan's character Bhaira was released on 16 August, coinciding with the actor's birthday. The film's trailer was launched at an event held in Film City, Mumbai on 10 September. The trailer, however garnered mixed response from certain sections of audiences; actor Vishwak Sen criticised few social media users peddling targeted hate against the trailer. Another trailer was released on 22 September 2024, five days ahead of the film's release.

The promotional campaign kickstarted with a press conference held in Chennai for the film's Tamil version on 17 September 2024, and promotional events were also planned in Kochi, Bangalore and Hyderabad. The film's pre-release event was initially planned at the H.I.C.C. Novotel in Hyderabad. However, it was cancelled due to the massive crowd of the actor's fans trying to enter the auditorium, exceeding its capacity; Rama Rao and Trivikram Srinivas, who was the event's chief guest, were eventually asked to walk out of the auditorium citing audience overflow. Rama Rao released a video message expressing his disappointment on the event's cancellation.

Karan Johar hosted an interview under the name Devara ka Jigra, with Rama Rao and Alia Bhatt, simultaneously handling the promotions for the latter's film Jigra. The interview was uploaded to the YouTube channel of Dharma Productions on 23 September. The interview featured the actors discussing their experiences on working in their respective films.

== Release ==
=== Theatrical ===
Devara: Part 1 was theatrically released on 27 September 2024 in Telugu, Hindi, Tamil, Malayalam and Kannada languages. The film was originally announced with a release date on 5 April 2024, coinciding with the weekend of Ugadi. However, it was pushed to 10 October 2024, during Dusshera navaratri, due to the extensive post-production and VFX works, before being moved to its earlier release date. Prior to the release, the makers trimmed seven minutes from the Hindi dubbed version featuring some solo scenes of Telugu actors in order to cater to a broader audience.

The film was released in standard, IMAX, 4DX, ScreenX, D-Box and ICE formats.

The film had its world premiere at the Beyond Fest film festival in Los Angeles on 26 September 2024, with Rama Rao and Siva participating in the event.

=== Distribution ===
Dharma Productions and AA Films acquired the theatrical distribution rights for the Hindi dubbed version. Sithara Entertainments acquired the distribution rights for the film in Andhra Pradesh and Telangana. KVN Productions and SS Karthikeya's Showing Business acquired the Karnataka theatrical rights. The North America distribution rights were acquired by Prathyangira Cinemas and Hamsini Entertainment. Theatrical rights for release in Tamil Nadu were purchased by Sri Lakshmi Movies, whereas Kerala distribution rights were bought by Wayfarer Films.

The ticket price hikes were estimated to be around ₹250 in single screen theatres and ₹418 in multiplex theatres across Telangana, and ₹200 in single screen theatres and ₹325 in multiplexes across Andhra Pradesh.

=== Pre-release business ===
Prior to its release, the film made a business of nearly ₹180 crore (US$19 million) from its theatrical rights. The Andhra Pradesh and Telangana distribution rights were sold for ₹113 crore (US$12 million). While earlier reports claimed that the film's theatrical rights for the Hindi version had been sold for ₹45–60 crore (US$5.4–7.2 million, (Note: While Pinkvilla reported that the theatrical rights in the Hindi version were sold to ₹45 crore (US$4.7 million), Deccan Chronicle reported that the amount was ₹60 crore (US$6.2 million).) with Deccan Chronicle attributing the huge price in the Hindi version to Rama Rao's fan following among the audiences in North India, as well as his Bollywood debut with War 2, calling it as "one of the highest rates for a Telugu actor in recent times". However, later reports claimed that the rights were sold for ₹15 crore (US$1.6 million). The film made a combined deal of ₹16.5 crore (US$1.7 million) from distribution in Tamil Nadu, Karnataka and Kerala theatres. The overseas distribution rights were sold for ₹26 crore (US$2.7 million). As per estimates, the film needed to earn around ₹180 crore distributor share (₹350 crore gross) at the worldwide box office to break even. It further made ₹150 crore (US$16 million) from non-theatrical rights, including digital, satellite and music rights.

=== Home media ===
The digital distribution rights of the film were acquired by Netflix for ₹155 crore (US$16 million). The film would have its digital premiere in all languages only after 7–8 weeks of its theatrical run. The film began streaming on Netflix from 8 November 2024 in Telugu and dubbed versions of Tamil, Malayalam and Kannada languages. An English dubbed version of the film began streaming from 21 November 2024. The Hindi dubbed version of the film began streaming from 22 November 2024.

== Reception ==
=== Box office ===
Devara: Part 1 recorded an estimated 42.70 lakh (4.27 million) footfalls in India on its opening day. The film grossed ₹140 crore (US$15 million)–₹172 crore (US$18 million) worldwide on its opening day, becoming Jr. NTR's second-biggest opener after RRR. The film grossed ₹200 crore (US$21 million) worldwide in two day of its release. and also crossed the ₹100 crore (US$10 million) mark in India. In its opening weekend, the film collected ₹250 crore (US$26 million) globally. The Indian Express reported the collection was ₹370 crore (US$38 million) in 7 days of its release. Hindustan Times reported that the film grossed ₹408 crore (US$42 million) worldwide in its two-week run, with ₹208 crore (US$22 million) from its home territory of Andhra Pradesh and Telangana. While, Daily News and Analysis reported that the film collected ₹420 crore (US$44 million) in its final run. As per Bollywood Hungama, it grossed over ₹521 crore (US$54 million) in 18 days of its release.

=== Critical response ===
Devara: Part 1 received mixed reviews from critics, praising its visuals, music, action sequences, production values, and performances but criticised its weak narrative, predictable storyline, lack of originality, and forced cliffhanger. On the review aggregator website Rotten Tomatoes, 35% of 17 critics' reviews are positive, with an average rating of 5.7/10.

Mahpara Kabir of ABP Live gave 3.5/5 stars and wrote "Devara: Part 1 is a gripping action drama that offers an entertaining cinematic experience. Jr NTR delivers a stellar performance in two distinct roles, while Saif Ali Khan shines as the vengeful antagonist. The film's stunning visuals, epic action sequences, and compelling performances make it a must-watch, even if the storyline becomes predictable at times." Bollywood Hungama gave 3/5 stars and wrote "Devara: Part 1 suffers from a weak second half, but makes up for the minuses with a terrific first half, clapworthy action scenes and mass-appealing avatar of Jr NTR."

Paul Nicodemus of The Times of India gave 3/5 stars and wrote "Devara: Part 1 is visually stunning but narratively underwhelming. Jr NTR's solid performance, combined with high production values and Anirudh's score, makes it worth watching." Lachmi Deb Roy of Firstpost gave 3/5 stars and wrote "Saif Ali Khan and NTR Jr ’s performance are larger than life, but only if some justice was done to the role given to Janhvi Kapoor, the movie could have been a super-hit. But, alas! she just had an ornamental role."

Sukanya Verma of Rediff gave 2.5/5 stars and wrote "Devara's self-appointed guardian of the sea unleashing violence as a means to end violence is purely Junior NTR fan-tasy." Sashidhar Adivi of Times Now gave 2.5/5 stars and wrote "Devara manages to dish up more action to drama to romance and even exotic locations in songs. However, a tighter writing in the second half could have made the film more engaging." Avad Mohammed of OTTplay gave 2.5/5 stars and wrote "Devara: Part 1 is a stylish action drama that has Jr NTR's terrific performance. While the visuals and action click, the drama is weak. The build-up for the second half looks half-baked and makes the film just a passable watch."

K. Janani of India Today gave 2.5/5 stars and wrote "Devara: Part 1 is an action drama with elaborate characterisations. The film is replete with great performances from Jr NTR and Saif Ali Khan, but the story remains predictable. Devara: Part 1 ends on a cliffhanger just like SS Rajamouli's Baahubali did, but it is also a film that makes you question if all ambitious films deserve two parts. Avinash Ramachandran of The Indian Express gave 2.5/5 stars and wrote "The Jr NTR film starts off really strong, only to suffer an extended downward slide that is finally salvaged by a bloody finale that is equal parts engaging and outlandish."

Saibal Chatterjee of NDTV gave 2.5/5 stars and wrote "Jr NTR, Janhvi Kapoor and Saif Ali Khan's film is a mixed bag. The parts that work, few and far between as they are, might serve to whet the appetite of fans of big-canvas action and melodrama." Jaya Dwivedi of India TV gave 2.5/5 stars and wrote "the writing and direction are weak and the film can come across as predictable. Moreover, audiences can feel like it's a repetition of several films that we have already watched in the past. Overall, the cinematography and acting are the only things that try to save the sinking boat. The film does not give you a new experience, overall there is a huge lack of originality."

BVS Prakash of Deccan Chronicle gave 2/5 stars and wrote "Director Koratala Siva should have selected a relatable script, than a fictional and weak plot for a big hero like NTR. He just banks on NTR's heroism and anger image and elevates it, but the emotional core among characters is missing. His concept of invisible fear would have worked better, if he had a good script on hand which is real and familiar." Pratikshya Mishra of The Quint rated the film with 2/5 stars.

Sangeetha Devi Dundoo of The Hindu wrote "Director Koratala Siva and Jr NTR mount an intense action drama, with huge help from Anirudh Ravichander, only for the later portions to lose steam in the over-zealousness to stretch the story for a sequel." Neeshita Nyayapati of Hindustan Times wrote "Koratala cannot help but write characters who want to save the world, and while that might not be a bad thing, it does feel repetitive. With a Baahubali-esque ending setting up the story for a sequel, here's hoping there are better things ahead."

== Accolades ==
Award	Date of ceremony	Category	Recipient(s)	Result	Ref.
Filmfare Awards South	2025	Best Actor – Telugu	N. T. Rama Rao Jr.	Nominated	
Filmfare Awards South	2025	Best Music Album	Anirudh Ravichander	Nominated	
Filmfare Awards South	2025	Best Playback Singer – Male	Anirudh Ravichander ("The Fear Song")	Nominated	
Filmfare Awards South	2025	Best Playback Singer – Female	Shilpa Rao ("Chuttamalle")	Won	
Filmfare Awards South	2025	Best Lyricist	Ramajogayya Sastry ("Chuttamalle")	Won	
South Indian International Movie Awards	2025	Best Film – Telugu	Devara: Part 1	Nominated	
South Indian International Movie Awards	2025	Best Actor in a Leading Role – Telugu	N. T. Rama Rao Jr.	Nominated	
South Indian International Movie Awards	2025	Best Music Director	Anirudh Ravichander	Nominated	
South Indian International Movie Awards	2025	Best Lyric Writer	Ramajogayya Sastry ("Chuttamalle")	Won	
South Indian International Movie Awards	2025	Best Playback Singer – Female	Shilpa Rao ("Chuttamalle")	Won	
South Indian International Movie Awards	2025	Best Cinematographer	R. Rathnavelu	Won	

== Future ==
Director Koratala Siva announced the film was split into two parts. A sequel titled Devara: Part 2, was revealed in end of the credits, that rumours the sequel was shelved due to mixed reviews of the film. On 27 September 2025, the first anniversary of the film, the makers announced the sequel was officially confirmed and is in development. Principal photography of the sequel will began on May 2026.
