= Yamuna (film) =

2013 Indian film by E. V. Ganeshbabu

- Directed by: E. V. Ganeshbabu
- Written by: E. V. Ganeshbabu
- Produced by: S. Jaikarthik; Viruthai M. Pandi
- Starring: Sathya; Sri Ramya
- Cinematography: Po. Chidambaram
- Edited by: B. Lenin
- Music by: Elakkiyan
- Production company: Sri Hari Balaji Movies
- Distributed by: SS studios
- Release date: 7 June 2013
- Country: India
- Language: Tamil

Yamuna is a 2013 Indian Tamil romantic drama film directed by E. V. Ganeshbabu, and starring Sathya, Sri Ramya, Aadukalam Naren and Vinodhini Vaidyanathan.

== Plot ==
Bhaskar is a nomad with a happy-go-lucky attitude and plays the usual lad with no big intentions however always surrounded by a bunch of like-minded friends. The usual friendship elements and fancy jokes among guys is their daily agenda, however Bhaskar's relationship with his father is rotten and he is constantly mocked for his attitude. Enter the lady of the hour Yamuna the girl who makes any guy fall for her instantly.

== Cast ==
- Sathya as Bhaskar
- Sri Ramya as Yamuna
- Vinodhini Vaidyanathan as Chandrika
- Aadukalam Naren
- Bala Singh
- Chaams as Punniyakkodi
- Pasanga Sivakumar
- TSK as Chinnamani
- Athullia D'couth as Malathi
- E. V. Ganeshbabu in a Special appearance
- Reyan Khan as Rahman
- Shifa (special appearance)

== Production ==
Sathya is the first student from Balu Mahendra's film institute got opportunity to act as Hero. Sri Ramya is a Telugu actress who acted in 1940 Lo Oka Gramam.

== Soundtrack ==
Soundtrack was composed by Elakkiyan, with lyrics by Vairamuthu.

- "Ottrai Panithuli" - Prasanna, Sainthavi
- "Oru Ponnapparu" - Rahul Nambiar, Sam P.Keerthan
- "Mannai Nambalaam" - Sam P. Keerthan
- "Dimba Dimba" - M. M. Manasi
- "Oh Nenje" - Haricharan
- "Oru Koottu Puzhu" - Padmalatha
