= E. V. Ganesh Babu =

Indian film director

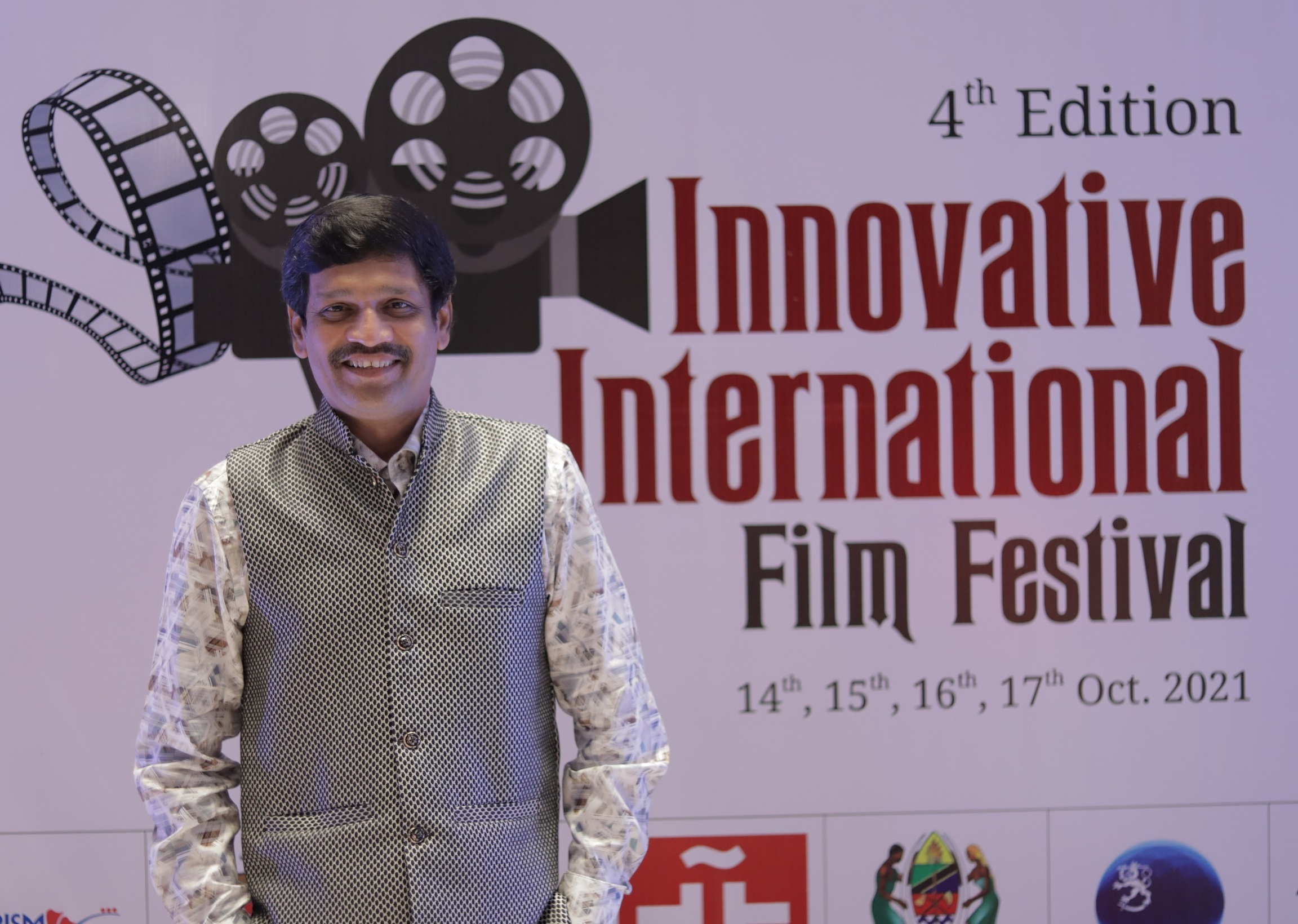
- E. V. Ganesh Babu at Film Festival
- Born: 17 November 1974 (age 51); Varagur, Thanjavur, Tamil Nadu, India
- Occupations: Director, actor, producer screenwriter, lyricist
- Years active: 2000–present
- Website: kattilmovie.com

E. V. Ganesh Babu is an Indian film director, writer and actor who works in Tamil-language films.

== Career ==
He made his acting debut with Bharathi (2000) and played Vijay's friend in four films including Sivakasi (2005).

He worked as an assistant director for Thenpandi Singam (2016) before making his debut as a director with Yamuna (2013). He directed and starred in a film titled Kattil opposite Srushti Dange, which was screened in 2021 at the Innovative International Film Festival. In 2022, he adapted the script of Kattil into a book. In 2023, his short film Karuvarai (2021) won the National Film Award – Special Mention (non-feature film).

He was also a CBFC member and was part of the committee that reviewed Jana Nayagan (2026).

== Filmography ==
=== As director ===
- Yamuna (2013)
- Kattil (2023)

=== As actor ===
- Bharathi (2000)
- Friends (2001)
- Bhagavathi (2002)
- Mounam Pesiyadhe (2002) (uncredited)
- Pudhiya Geethai (2003)
- Ooruku Nooruper (2003)
- Oruththi (2003)
- Autograph (2004)
- Sivakasi (2005)
- Manathodu Mazhaikalam (2006)
- Mozhi (2007) (uncredited)
- Kattradhu Thamizh (2007)
- Arai En 305-il Kadavul (2008)
- Silandhi (2008)
- Surya (2008)
- Jaggubhai (2010)
- Anandhapurathu Veedu (2010)
- Yamuna (2013)
- Kattil (2023)

=== Television ===
- 2001 Ramani vs Ramani - Part 2 (Raj TV)
- 2002 - 2004 Rudraveena (Raj TV)
- 2010-2013 Thirumathi Selvam (Sun TV)
- 2015-2018 Kuladeivam (Sun TV) as Duraipandi
- 2018 Valli (Sun TV) as Auto Driver (Guest appearance)
