= Bharat Ane Nenu =

2018 Indian Telugu film by Koratala Siva

- Theatrical release poster
- Directed by: Koratala Siva
- Written by: Koratala Siva
- Produced by: D. V. V. Danayya
- Starring: Mahesh Babu; Kiara Advani; Prakash Raj
- Cinematography: Ravi K. Chandran; Tirru
- Edited by: A. Sreekar Prasad
- Music by: Devi Sri Prasad
- Production company: DVV Entertainments
- Release date: 20 April 2018
- Running time: 173 minutes
- Country: India
- Language: Telugu
- Budget: ₹65 crore
- Box office: est.₹225 crore

Bharat Ane Nenu (transl. I am Bharat) is a 2018 Indian Telugu-language political action drama film written and directed by Koratala Siva, and produced by D. V. V. Danayya. The film stars Mahesh Babu in the titlular role, with an ensemble cast of Kiara Advani, Prakash Raj, R. Sarathkumar, Aamani, Devaraj, Posani Krishna Murali, P. Ravi Shankar, Yashpal Sharma, Ajay, Rao Ramesh, Jeeva and Brahmaji. The music was composed by Devi Sri Prasad, with the cinematography and editing handled by Ravi K. Chandran, Tirru, and A. Sreekar Prasad respectively.

The plot follows Bharat, an Oxford university student who returns to India following the demise of his father, the chief minister of Andhra Pradesh (United Andhra Pradesh). Disillusioned by the corruption he encounters, Bharat decides to bring about a change in the system after becoming the new chief minister, eventually facing controversies and making enemies. The film was released theatrically on 20 April 2018 and grossed ₹225 crore world wide, becoming the highest grossing Telugu film of 2018.

== Plot ==
Set in 2013, United Andhra Pradesh, Bharath Ram, a brilliant and curious student, graduates with his 5th degree from Oxford. After celebrating, his paternal uncle Varadarajulu tells him that his father, Raghava Rao, Chief Minister of Andhra Pradesh, died from a stroke. Bharath flies home and reminisces.

As a child, Bharath spent most of his time with his mother and best friend, Subhash, as his father was busy setting up a political party with Varadarajulu, who was the party president. After breaking a small promise, his mother scolds him and tells him about the importance of commitments. She dies in her sleep afterwards, impacting Bharath immensely. Raghava Rao then takes care of him at home, but Varadarajulu tells him that he must prepare for the upcoming elections and suggests he remarry to give Bharath a new mother. He has another child, Siddharth, with his new wife. Bharath's attempts to bond with his stepmother fail, so he spends more time at Subhash's house. Soon, Subhash's parents get jobs in London, and Bharat wants to go with them, to which Raghava Rao reluctantly agrees.

In a flashback, Bharath arrives in India and attends his father's funeral. Varadarajulu tells Bharath that his father had to be hospitalised. Varadarajulu informs Bharath that his father was hospitalised due to the cold and that Siddharth completed the final rites. This causes speculation about the next Chief Minister. Bharath becomes frustrated with the chaotic atmosphere and is introduced to politicians like Sripathi Rao and Manohar. As Bharath prepares to return to London, Varadarajulu cancels his ticket, and he suggests Bharath as the next Chief Minister. Bharath objects and asks Varadarajulu to accede instead, but he opposes since his position would cause intra-party conflict. Despite his inexperience, Bharath becomes the CM and restores law and order using his strict policies and novel ideas, earning the opposition's ire. He comes across a girl named Vasumathi and instantly falls in love with her. Bharath surprises Vasumathi by calling her and asking her out about kindling romance. Bharath prompts an investigation into money laundering among politicians, but Varadarajulu stops the investigation and invites Bharath to a small party where they collaborate and scheme to surprise him. Bharath decides to remove corruption from politics.

One day, Ramana and other youths from Kakinada visit Bharath, who accuses their MLA, Damu, of corruption. A by-election is scheduled, and Raghu, Damu's son, is contesting. The villagers are upset, and Bharath instructs Ramana to run as an independent candidate. Damu's henchmen kill many villagers, and Bharath sends undercover police to protect Ramana. Damu's police officers attempt to murder Ramana at his cinema theatre, but Bharath arrives in time. After Bharath defeats his henchmen, Damu retreats. Bharath decides to establish local governance, which succeeds despite the assembly's disapproval. However, Varadarajulu exposes Bharath's relationship with Vasumathi, leading to a scandal and accusations of nepotism. Bharath resigns, Varadarajulu becomes Chief Minister, and Vasumathi and her father move to their native village.

Bharath organises a press meet to criticise their sensationalism. The public visits their MLAs and calls for Bharath's reinstatement as Chief Minister. ACP Krishna IPS informs Bharath of a journalist named Mitra Brahmapur, Odisha. Bharath, along with his Security Officer Mukhtar, goes there and learn that the journalist met with Raghava Rao before his death and proved Varadarajulu's corruption to him. The ruling party's executive committee requests that Varadarajulu resign and reinstate Bharath as CM. Varadarajulu plans to kill Bharath, and Mukthar is shot in an ambush. Bharath and Mukthar escape, and they encounter Varadarajulu's henchmen. Bharath fights them in an abandoned area, and villagers arrive to protect him. They follow Bharath to Varadarajulu's office, where they face off.

Varadarajulu confesses to tampering with Raghava Rao's medicines to slowly paralyse and kill him due to Raghava's doubts about his corruption. Bharath gives Varadarajulu 24 hours to admit his crimes to the public and surrender. After leaving, Varadarajulu commits suicide. The Legislature is dissolved, and Bharath wins the election. All corrupt politicians are arrested, and Bharath returns as Chief Minister. The film ends with Bharath proposing marriage to Vasumathi.

== Cast ==
- Mahesh Babu as Bharath Ram, Chief Minister of Andhra Pradesh (United Andhra Pradesh).
- Kiara Advani as Vasumathi, an MBA graduate, a UPSC aspirant doing internship at CMO and Bharath's love interest (Voice dubbed by RJ Swetha)
- Prakash Raj as Varadarajulu "Nanaji", Party President, Raghava Rao's best friend, Bharat's father figure, later becomes CM of united Andhra Pradesh for a short term.
- Devaraj as Opposition Leader Sripathi Rao
- R. Sarathkumar as Late CM Raghava Rao, Bharath's father and ex-chief minister of undivided Andhra Pradesh
- Aamani as Bharath's mother (Cameo Appearance)
- P. Ravi Shankar as MLA Damu
- Posani Krishna Murali as Minister Appalanaidu
- Rao Ramesh as Head Constable Ramachandra, Vasumathi's father
- Sithara as Bharath's stepmother
- Brahmaji as Bhaskar IAS, Bharath's personal secretary
- Ajay as Arvind Krishna IPS, Additional DIG, CBCID
- Banerjee as Minister
- Jeeva as Education Minister Para Bramham (PB)
- Prudhviraj as MLA
- Devadas Kanakala as Senior Politician
- Yashpal Sharma as Manohar Rao, Sripathi Rao's son
- Mukthar Khan as CM Security Officer Mukthar
- Shatru as Jagadish, Damu's son
- Surya as Mithra, Investigation Journalist
- Saakshi Sivaa as Bharath's uncle
- Jayalalita as Assembly Speaker
- Rajitha as Minister
- Kaumudi Nemani as Manju, Bharath's stepsister
- Rahul Ramakrishna as MLA Ramana, who won against Damu in the by-election with the support of CM Bharath
- Anish Kuruvilla as CS Srivastava IAS
- Mahadevan as Varadarajulu's aide
- Rajsekhar Aningi as Journalist
- Master Mikhail Gandhi as Siddharth, Bharath's stepbrother
- Appaji Ambarisha Darbha as an IAS officer
- Ramajogayya Sastry in a cameo appearance in Vachaadayyo Saami song
- Sudhakar Mishra as CMO official

== Production ==
=== Development ===
DVV Danayya announced that they would produce a film with Mahesh Babu directed by Koratala Siva in mid-2016. Devi Sri Prasad (DSP) was selected to compose music for the film.

=== Casting ===
Kiara Advani played the role of the Chief Minister's girlfriend. R. Sarathkumar was roped in to play the role of Mahesh Babu's father, and Prakash Raj signed in to play the role of antagonist.

Actor Devaraj, who played prominent antagonistic roles in Telugu cinemas in the first decade of the 21st century, was noted to appear in a Telugu film after a gap of 11 years through Bharat Ane Nenu, where he played the role of leader of the opposition party.

=== Crew ===
Stunt duo Ram-Laxman performed the stunt choreography for this film. The dance choreography was performed by Raju Sundaram, Dinesh, and Raghu. Production design was done by A.S. Prakash.

=== Filming ===
"I Don't Know", the first South Indian song sung by Farhan Akhtar, was shot in Spain with Mahesh Babu and was choreographed by Raju Sundaram.

== Soundtrack ==
Bharat Ane Nenu

Soundtrack album by Devi Sri Prasad
- Released: 7 April 2018
- Recorded: 2017
- Genre: Feature film soundtrack
- Length: 24:34
- Labels: Lahari Music; T-Series
- Producer: Devi Sri Prasad

Devi Sri Prasad chronology
| Rangasthalam (2018) | Bharat Ane Nenu (2018) | Saamy Square (2018) |

The soundtrack of the film was composed by Devi Sri Prasad. The album features five songs, out of which three of them were released as singles. The first single "Bharat Ane Nenu" was released on 25 March 2018, at the occasion of Ram Navmi. The second single "I Don't Know" was launched on 1 April 2018. Farhan Akhtar lent his voice for the song "I Don't Know", which marked the first time he sang for a South Indian film. The third track "Vachaadayyo Swami", was released on 6 April 2018. The soundtrack was launched at the pre-release event which took place in the Lal Bahadur Shastri Stadium on 7 April 2018, with N. T. Rama Rao Jr. being the chief guest.

All lyrics are written by Ramajogayya Sastry.

Track-List
| No. | Title | Artist(s) | Length |
|---|---|---|---|
| 1. | "Bharat Ane Nenu (The Song Of Bharat)" | David Simon | 05:15 |
| 2. | "I Don't Know" | Farhan Akhtar | 04:28 |
| 3. | "Vachaadayyo Saami" | Kailash Kher, Divya Kumar | 05:23 |
| 4. | "Ide Kalala Vunnadhe" | Andrea Jeremiah | 04:32 |
| 5. | "O Vasumathi" | Yazin Nizar, Rita | 05:11 |
| Total length: | | | 24:34 |

== Release ==
Bharat Ane Nenu was released theatrically on 20 April 2018, while the dubbed Tamil version titled Bharat Ennum Naan was released theatrically on 25 May 2018. It was later dubbed and released in Hindi as Dashing CM Bharath on 2 November 2018.

== Reception ==
=== Critical reception ===
On the review aggregator website Rotten Tomatoes, 88% of 8 critics' reviews are positive, with an average rating of 6.8/10.

Hemanth Kumar of Firstpost wrote "Mahesh Babu, Koratala Siva deliver an intense political drama". Kumar also said, "He (Siva) has shown yet again that there's plenty of drama when a normal guy takes an uncommon path. Bharat might have become the messiah of the state in the story, but it's Mahesh Babu who leaves a long lasting impression in the end. Two big thumbs up for the film. It delivers more than what it promises" giving 4 stars out of 5. Priyanka Sundar of Hindustan Times gave the film 3 stars out of 5, saying "Mahesh Babu as CM ushers in a new era. Mahesh Babu has the best of what commercial cinema has to offer – a strong subject, a tight film and a role he can chew on."

Suhas Yellapantula of The Times of India rated the 3.5 stars out of 5, mentioning "Bharat Ane Nenu gives you a lot to root for and provides a bang for your buck but lacks the finesse that makes for a good political thriller.". Sangeetha Devi Dundoo of The Hindu wrote, "This promise ticks the right boxes. Bharat Ane Nenu deserves a thumbs up for its well thought out plot and nuanced characters. Keeping us hooked to the narrative are Mahesh Babu, accompanied by Prakash Raj in another winsome and complex role, Rahul Ramakrishna, Rao Ramesh, Brahmaji and Kiara Advani among others. Kiara is impressive.".

=== Box office ===
Bharat Ane Nenu grossed ₹225 crore in its full theatrical run, including other versions like Tamil.

== Awards and nominations ==
| Date of ceremony | Award | Category | Recipient(s) and nominee(s) | Result | Ref. |
|---|---|---|---|---|---|
| 6 January 2019 | Zee Cine Awards Telugu | Best Dialogues | Koratala Siva | Won | |
| 6 January 2019 | Zee Cine Awards Telugu | Best Find of the year - Female | Kiara Advani | Won | |
| 15 & 16 August 2019 | South Indian International Movie Awards | Best Film – Telugu | DVV Entertainments | Nominated | |
| 15 & 16 August 2019 | South Indian International Movie Awards | Best Actor (Telugu) | Mahesh Babu | Nominated | |
| 15 & 16 August 2019 | South Indian International Movie Awards | Best Female Debut (Telugu) | Kiara Advani | Nominated | |
| 15 & 16 August 2019 | South Indian International Movie Awards | Best Male Playback Singer (Telugu) | Kailash Kher | Nominated | |
| 21 December 2019 | Filmfare Awards South | Best Film – Telugu | Bharat Ane Nenu | Nominated | |
| 21 December 2019 | Filmfare Awards South | Best Director – Telugu | Koratala Siva | Nominated | |
| 21 December 2019 | Filmfare Awards South | Best Actor – Telugu | Mahesh Babu | Nominated | |
