= Narasimha Nandi =

Indian film screenwriter, director, producer and playwright

- Occupations: Director; Screenwriter

Narasimha Nandi (born Narasimha Reddy) is an Indian film, screenwriter, director, producer and playwright known for his works predominantly in Telugu cinema. In 2008, he garnered the National Film Award and Nandi Award for directing 1940 Lo Oka Gramam. In 2013, he served in the Jury for South Region-2 at the 60th National Film Awards

== Filmography ==
Year	Film	Director	Producer	Screenwriter	Actor	Notes
2008	1940 Lo Oka Gramam	Yes		Yes		National Film Award for Best Feature Film in Telugu; Sarojini Devi Award for a Film on National Integration
2009	High School	Yes		Yes		
2013	Kamalatho Naa Prayanam	Yes		Yes		
2016	Lajja	Yes	Yes	Yes	Yes	
2019	Degree College	Yes	Yes	Yes		

== Awards ==
National Film Awards

- National Film Award for Best Feature Film in Telugu (director) - 1940 Lo Oka Gramam (2008)

Nandi Awards

- Sarojini Devi Award for a Film on National Integration (director) - 1940 Lo Oka Gramam (2008)
