= Kattil =

2023 Tamil-language film

- Theatrical release poster
- Directed by: E. V. Ganesh Babu
- Written by: B. Lenin
- Starring: E. V. Ganesh Babu; Srushti Dange; Semmalar Annam
- Cinematography: Ravishankar
- Edited by: B. Lenin
- Music by: Srikanth Deva
- Production company: Pulse Entertainments
- Release date: 8 December 2023
- Country: India
- Language: Tamil

Kattil (transl. Bed) is a 2023 Indian Tamil-language drama film written and directed by E. V. Ganesh Babu. Written and edited by B. Lenin, the film stars E.V. Ganesh Babu, Srushti Dange and Semmalar Annam in the lead roles. The film was released theatrically on 8 December 2023.

== Cast ==
- E. V. Ganesh Babu
- Srushti Dange as Dhanam
- Semmalar Annam
- Geetha Kailasam
- Kannika Ravi
- Sampath Ram
- Indra Sounderrajan as Ramaiah
- Master Nitish as the younger Suresh
- Vidharth as Suresh (guest appearance)

== Production ==
In September 2019, film editor B. Lenin and director E. V. Ganesh Babu chose to collaborate on a project titled Kattil, based on a story written by Lenin. Srushti Dange was signed on to play a pivotal role, with the shoot taking place across Karaikudi, Pollachi and Palakkad in late 2019. The film notably marked the debut of theatre-person and producer Geetha Kailasam. The shoot of the film was completed in January 2021.

Following delays, the team prepared the film for release in 2023, and dubbed the film in Telugu and Kannada as Mancha.

== Release and reception ==
The film had a theatrical release on 8 December 2023 across Tamil Nadu. A critic from The Hindu gave the film 2.5 out of 5 stars, praising the story. A reviewer from Vikatan noted that it was an "emotional tale let down by poor making".
