= Janatha Garage =

2016 Indian film by Koratala Siva

- Theatrical release poster
- Directed by: Koratala Siva
- Written by: Koratala Siva
- Produced by: Naveen Yerneni; Yalamanchili Ravi Shankar; Mohan Cherukuri (CVM)
- Starring: Mohanlal; N.T. Rama Rao Jr.; Samantha; Nithya Menen; Unni Mukundan
- Cinematography: Tirru
- Edited by: Kotagiri Venkateswara Rao
- Music by: Devi Sri Prasad
- Production company: Mythri Movie Makers
- Distributed by: Eros International
- Release date: 1 September 2016
- Running time: 162 minutes
- Country: India
- Language: Telugu
- Budget: ₹50 crore
- Box office: est. ₹150 crore

Janatha Garage (transl. People's Garage) is a 2016 Indian Telugu-language vigilante action drama film written and directed by Koratala Siva and produced by Mythri Movie Makers. The film stars an ensemble cast including Mohanlal, N. T. Rama Rao Jr., Samantha Ruth Prabhu, Nithya Menen and Unni Mukundan. Devi Sri Prasad composed the music for the film, while Tirru and Kotagiri Venkateswara Rao handled the cinematography and editing. The film follows Anand, an environmental activist who comes to Hyderabad to attend a seminar, where an unexpected encounter with Sathyam, a mechanic who runs a criminal organisation called "Janatha Garage" for the oppressed, changes his purpose in life.

Janatha Garage was released worldwide on 1 September 2016 and received positive reviews from the critics. The film registered the highest opening day collection for a Telugu film with over ₹41 crore in 2016 becoming the second-highest Telugu opening of all-time behind Baahubali: The Beginning, at the time. The film was a major commercial success grossing over ₹150 crore on a budget of ₹50 crore, making it the highest-grossing Telugu film of 2016.

It won two awards at the 64th National Film Awards—Special Jury Award for Mohanlal and Best Choreography for Raju Sundaram. It also won seven Nandi Awards—Best Popular Feature Film, Best Actor (N.T. Rama Rao Jr.), Best Supporting Actor (Mohanlal), Best Story Writer (Koratala Siva), Best Choreographer (Sundaram), Best Art Director (A.S. Prakash) and Best Lyricist (Ramajogayya Sastry). It also won the state Gaddar Award for Third Best Feature Film.

== Plot ==
Sathyam, a generous auto mechanic in Visakhapatnam, moves to Hyderabad upon his brother Shiva's encouragement to open a large auto repair shop named "Janatha Garage". When a close friend's college-going daughter is sexually assaulted and murdered by influential goons, ASP Chandrashekar admits his inability to act without evidence. Taking matter into his own hands, Sathyam executes the perpetrators and stages their deaths as an accident. Following this incident, Janatha Garage evolves into a vigilant sanctuary for the underprivileged seeking justice. Mukesh, a corrupt tycoon whose illegal operations are continuously thwarted by Sathyam, has Shiva and his wife killed. Fearing for the safety of Shiva's orphaned infant son, Anand, Sathyam entrusts the child to Shiva's brother-in-law Suresh to be raised away from the garage oblivious to his paternal family.

Years later, Anand grows up in Mumbai as a passionate environmental science student and activist, possessing the same fiery sense of justice as his uncle. His confrontational nature worries Suresh, who has arranged for Anand to marry his daughter Bujji. After Anand gets into a physical altercation with a local MLA over environmental violations, a concerned Suresh sends him to Hyderabad on a university exchange program. Meanwhile, Sathyam survives an assassination attempt planned by Mukesh, but his failing health forces his crew to step back from vigilantism. Sathyam's biological son, Raghava, rejects his father's righteous path, marrying Mukesh's daughter Riya and pursuing ruthless business ambitions.

In Hyderabad, Anand single-handedly thwarts an illicit mining operation run by Raghava's men. Deeply impressed by Anand's principles without knowing their blood relation, Sathyam invites him to join Janatha Garage. Anand accepts, stepping up to lead the time and revive its mission to helping those in need. Chandrashekar, now the Commissioner of Police, recognizes Anand and informs Suresh about the events. Fearing the garage's violent environment, Suresh forces Anand to choose between Bujji and his commitment to Janatha Garage. Choosing the garage's crusade, Anand tearfully parts with Bujji, who is subsequently married to someone else. Raghava also severs ties with Sathyam after an altercation with Anand over his lifestyle. During this period, Anand reconnects with Anu, Chandrashekar's daughter, and the two fall in love.

A series of devastating bomb blasts occur in Hyderabad, resulting in the death of the fiancee of Bose, one of Sathyam's most trusted allies. Subsequently, Bose commits suicide. When the police chief pressures Chandrashekar to shelve the investigation, he turns to Janatha Garage for assistance. Anand tracks down the terrorists and discovers that Raghava and Mukesh orchestrated the bombings to destroy Janatha Garage's influence. He further discovers that Raghava brutally murdered Bose after he uncovered the conspiracy. Devastated by his son's atrocities, Sathyam declares that Raghava must face ultimate justice. Anand and Sathyam storm the syndicate's hideout, overcoming their forces. Anand kills Mukesh, while Sathyam personally executes Raghava despite his pleas for mercy.

Sometime later, Sathyam's family celebrates a firecracker-free Diwali, where a supportive Anu encourages Anand to answer a call for help, continuing the legacy of Janatha Garage.

== Cast ==
- Mohanlal as Sathyam, the leader of Janatha Garage (voice dubbed by Srinivasa Murthy)
- N. T. Rama Rao Jr. as Anand, Sathyam's nephew, Shiva's son
- Samantha as Bujji (voice dubbed by Chinmayi Sripada)
- Nithya Menen as Anu Anand, Chandra Shekar's daughter, Anand's wife
- Unni Mukundan as Raghava, Sathyam's son
- Rahman as Shiva, Sathyam's brother, Anand's father
- Suresh as Suresh, Anand's uncle and Bujji's father
- Sai Kumar as K. Chandra Shekar IPS
- Sachin Khedekar as Mukesh Rana
- Devayani as Padma, Sathyam's wife
- Ajay as Bose
- Brahmaji as Shankar
- Sithara as Bujji's mother
- Rao Ramesh As Ram Prasad, Anand’s father in law
- John Kokken as Satpal Singh Yadav
- Vijayakumar as Chief Minister Vijayakumar
- Sharath Lohithaswa as Home Minister
- Raghu Babu as Reddy
- Rajiv Kanakala as Vikas, a government employee
- Ashish Vidhyarthi as Raghava's business partner and politician
- Anitha Chowdary as Anu's mother
- Surya as Sathyam's brother-in-law
- Vidisha Srivastava as Riya Rana, Raghava's wife and Mukesh's daughter
- Banerjee as Saidulu
- Aathma Patrick as Seena
- Meena as Vikas's wife
- Sravan as Mukesh's henchman
- Ravi Prakash as Dinesh Kumar IPS, Anu's suitor and Chandra Shekhar's colleague
- Rajitha as Dinesh's mother
- Jeeva as Bujji's boss
- Appaji Ambarisha Darbha as IAS officer
- Chalapathi Rao as Director General of Police
- Vennela Kishore as Pyarelal
- Vidhya Vijayakumar as Anand's friend
- Kajal Aggarwal as Bangaram in a cameo appearance in the item song "Pakka Local"
- Syed Sohel as Anand's friend (uncredited role in "Pranaamam" and "Rock On Bro" songs)

== Production ==
=== Development ===
Koratala Siva decided to finalise his next project with N. T. Rama Rao Jr., after the reception of his Mahesh Babu-starrer Srimanthudu (2015). According to a report from Ritz Magazine, dated 21 September 2015, the makers decided to plan the shoot in January 2016, after NTR completing his work with Nannaku Prematho (2016). On 4 October 2015, Mythri Movie Makers, which produced Siva's earlier film Srimanthudu, had announced their confirmation on teaming up with the project titled as #NTR26. A formal launch ceremony was held on 25 October 2015, at the office of the film's production house, with the makers revealing the film's title as Janatha Garage. The film's technical department included composer Devi Sri Prasad, editor Kotagiri Venkateswara Rao and art director A.S. Prakash, who worked in the director's previous film, alongside cinematographer Tirru. On 26 November 2015, the makers have announced that Superstar Mohanlal was signed in to a play another lead role, thus marking his third film in Telugu film after Gandeevam (1994) and Manamantha (2015).

=== Casting ===
Amyra Dastur, Samantha Ruth Prabhu and Parineeti Chopra were considered playing the female lead opposite NTR. But in December 2015, it was confirmed that Samantha Ruth Prabhu will be playing the female lead marking her fourth collaboration with NTR, along with Nithya Menen as the second female lead. Malayalam actor Unni Mukundan was reported to play the antagonist in January 2016. It was also reported that Unni Mukundan will be playing the role of the son of Mohanlal and Cousin of Jr. NTR. Reportedly, this movie is a family drama, and it deals about the issues between two cousins, played by NTR and Unni Mukundan. In February 2016, it was reported that former Tamil actress Devayani would play the wife of Mohanlal's character. The very same month Brahmaji, Sai Kumar, Ajay, Sithara were included in the film's cast. It was reported that Sai Kumar, the latter would play the father of Jr. NTR. In March 2016, Rahman was reported to be part of this movie playing as brother to Mohanlal.

=== Filming ===
The regular shooting of this film was expected to begin on 9 February 2016. Art Director A.S. Prakash erected a huge set at Saradhi Studios, Hyderabad during the first week of January 2016, which costs around ₹3 crores. It was reported that this movie will be shot mainly in Hyderabad, Mumbai and Kerala. The film's shooting was launched on 22 February 2016, with the first schedule took place at the Ramoji Film City in Hyderabad, and it was wrapped up in four days. The second schedule featuring NTR and Menen, was commenced in Mumbai on 5 to 22 March, after which the unit returned to Hyderabad. The third schedule began in Hyderabad on 25 March in the specially erected set at Saradhi Studios. Samantha joined the shooting in this schedule, and scenes featuring Mohanlal Jr. Ntr, Samantha, and Unni Mukundan were filmed in this schedule.

After a brief break, NTR joined the sets of the film on 5 May 2016, while Mohanlal was reported to join the shoot only in June 2016, as he had to complete wrapping up his Priyadarshan-directorial Oppam (2016). Mohanlal later joined the sets in Hyderabad. Few portions of the film shot in Chennai, were wrapped in the end of the month. Mohanlal completed his portions on mid-June. The team underwent post-production formalities during the intermediate schedule, whilst the makers planned for a grand song shoot. While the makers planned to rope Tamannaah Bhatia, for the song shoot, her dates were not available and the team chose Kajal Aggarwal. On 23 August 2016, the makers announced that they have completed the shooting of the film.

== Music ==
Janatha Garage

Soundtrack album by Devi Sri Prasad
- Released: 25 March 2016
- Recorded: 2016
- Genre: Feature film soundtrack
- Length: 22:03
- Language: Telugu
- Label: Lahari Music
- Producer: Devi Sri Prasad

Devi Sri Prasad chronology
Sardaar Gabbar Singh (2017)	Janatha Garage (2016)	Khaidi No. 150 (2017)

The film's soundtrack album is composed by Devi Sri Prasad. Janatha Garage marks Prasad's third collaboration with the director Koratala Siva, after Mirchi (2013) and Srimanthudu (2015). The regular music sitting discussions were held at the composer's studio in February 2016, with Prasad and Siva being present. Ramajogayya Sastry wrote lyrics for the songs. The makers planned to release the audio on mid-July 2016. However, it was revealed that the audio launch event will be held on 22 March 2016, at the Shilpakala Vedika in Hyderabad. The film's cast and crew (excluding Samantha), attended the event, with Mahesh Babu, gracing the event as the chief guest. Lahari Music label, released the soundtrack digitally on the day of its release.

All lyrics are written by Ramajogayya Sastry.

No.	Title	Singer(s)	Length
1.	"Pranaamam Pranaamam"	Shankar Mahadevan	3:55
2.	"Rock On Bro"	Raghu Dixit	4:05
3.	"Apple Beauty"	Yazin Nizar, Neha Bhasin	3:52
4.	"JayaHo Janatha"	Sukhwinder Singh, Vijay Prakash	4:15
5.	"Nee Selavadigi"	Shweta Mohan	1:35
6.	"Pakka Local"	Geetha Madhuri, Sagar	4:21
Total length:			22:03

== Release ==
On the film's launch, Naveen Yerenini originally slated that the film will release on 12 August 2016, which falls on the Independence Day weekend. However, due to delay in post-production activities, and also the release of Mohanlal's another Telugu film Manamantha on 5 August, prompted the makers to postpone the film's release on 2 September 2016, during the eve of Ganesh Chathurthi. On 26 August, the film was awarded a U/A certificate by the Central Board of Film Certification.

Janatha Garage was released on 1610 screens in India and around 2010 screens worldwide. It was one of the biggest release for a Telugu film. Preview shows were started across US theatres on 31 August. The movie ran for 50 days in 39 centers in AP and Telangana.

It was also dubbed in Malayalam and released in Kerala by Maxlab Cinemas and Entertainments. The film was also dubbed in Hindi as Janta Garage and released on YouTube by Goldmines Telefilms on 24 June 2017. The film was also dubbed in Odia as Janatha Gyarege by Raja Ram Cine Production in 2018.

=== Distribution ===
Dil Raju bought the theatrical rights of the film for ₹15.3 crore (US$1.6 million) in the Nizam region; the Ceded rights were sold for ₹9 crore (US$960,000); the theatrical rights in Vizag were sold for ₹5.12 crore (US$550,000); Guntur rights were sold for ₹7.53 crore (US$800,000); Krishna rights were sold for ₹8.34 crore (US$890,000); Nellore theatrical rights were sold for ₹2.34 crore (US$250,000). The film's theatrical rights in the Andhra-Telangana region were sold to ₹47.63 crore (US$5.1 million).

Aashirvad Cinemas bought the rights for the Kerala region for ₹4.20 crore (US$450,000), the Karnataka rights were sold for ₹7.02 crore (US$750,000). SPI Cinemas acquired the Tamil Nadu theatrical rights for ₹70 lakh (US$75,000). It was sold for ₹60 lakh (US$64,000), for various distributors in the rest of India. The overseas rights were sold for ₹7.25 crore (US$770,000).

=== Pre-release business ===
The film's theatrical rights were sold to ₹2.4 crore (US$260,000), and the film made a pre-release business of ₹1.70 crore (US$180,000), including the satellite and audio rights.

=== Marketing ===
On the occasion of N.T. Rama Rao Jr.'s birthday, the makers unveiled the first look poster on 20 May 2016, along with a motion poster. On 21 May 2016, another poster featuring Mohanlal was released, coinciding with his birthday. On 6 July 2016, coinciding with the occasion of Ramzan, the makers unveiled the official teaser of the film, and got more than 24,000 likes in one hour of its release. The teaser gained three million views within four days and more than 67,000 likes, becoming the most liked teaser in Tollywood. The film's theatrical trailer was unveiled on 12 August 2016, at the film's audio launch event held at Shilpakala Vedika in Hyderabad.

=== Home media ===
The satellite and digital rights of the film were purchased by Star Maa and Disney+ Hotstar for a record sum of ₹12.50 crore (US$1.3 million). The television premiere of Janatha Garage took place on 23 October 2016 and registered a record TRP rating of 20.69, which is the highest in the year.

== Reception ==
Janatha Garage received positive reviews from critics.

=== Critical response ===
123Telugu gave 3.25/5 stars and wrote "Janatha Garage is not your regular popcorn entertainer which Tollywood churns out every week. It is a character-driven film where the onus is on serious emotions. The film will appeal to the general audience more than the fans." Pranita Jonnalagedda of The Times of India gave 3/5 stars and wrote "This Janatha Garage might give everyone a hand in repairs but they need a wee bit of repair themselves for sure. But that’s no reason to miss the film."

G. Ragesh of Onmanorama gave 2.5/5 stars and wrote "Koratala Siva, has tried to keep Janatha Garage as entertaining as possible for regular audience of Telugu films with a mix of popular ingredients. Siva deserves applause for finding Mohanlal fit to play his kind-hearted don with a salt and pepper beard." Goutham V. S. of The Indian Express gave 2/5 stars and wrote "Despite a good message, Mohanlal and Jr NTR film is a predictable, run-of-the-mill drama that fails to offer anything new." Srivatsan of India Today gave 1.5/5 stars and wrote "Janatha Garage is garnished with masala ingredients that only cater to entertainment-seeking audiences. Siva somehow readies the audience for a promising entertainer; however, ends up delivering a bland surreal revenge drama."

Sangeetha Devi Dundoo of The Hindu wrote "NTR and Mohanlal’s performances save an otherwise tepid film." Latha Srinivasan of Firstpost wrote "Janatha Garage may not be one of director Koratala Siva's best films but it is a film that has its moments where Mohanlal and NTR Jr shine." Govind Vijaykumar of Deccan Chronicle wrote "Janatha Garage falls short of expectations. It is slower than Koratala Siva’s earlier films. The director has chosen a good subject, but he has failed to narrate the same properly. Except for a few interesting scenes, the film is predictable and outdated."

=== Box office ===
On 9 September 2016, the film collected more than ₹100 crore (US$11 million), within a week's time.

== Accolades ==
Ceremony	Category	Nominee	Result	Ref.
64th National Film Awards	Special Jury Award	Mohanlal	Won	
64th National Film Awards	Best Choreography	Raju Sundaram (for "Pranaamam")	Won	
Nandi Awards	Best Popular Feature Film	Y. Naveen, Y. Ravi Shankar, C. V. Mohan	Won	
Nandi Awards	Best Actor	N. T. Rama Rao Jr.	Won	
Nandi Awards	Best Supporting Actor	Mohanlal	Won	
Nandi Awards	Best Story Writer	Koratala Siva	Won	
Nandi Awards	Best Choreographer	Raju Sundaram (for "Pranaamam")	Won	
Nandi Awards	Best Art Director	A.S. Prakash	Won	
Nandi Awards	Best Lyricist	Ramajogayya Sastry (for "Pranaamam")	Won	
64th Filmfare Awards South	Filmfare Award for Best Director – Telugu	Koratala Siva	Nominated	
64th Filmfare Awards South	Filmfare Award for Best Supporting Actor – Telugu	Mohanlal	Nominated	
64th Filmfare Awards South	Filmfare Award for Best Lyricist – Telugu	Ramajogayya Sastry (for "Pranaamam")	Won	
64th Filmfare Awards South	Best Choreography	Sekhar (for "Apple Beauty")	Won	
6th South Indian International Movie Awards	SIIMA Award for Best Film (Telugu)	Mythri Movie Makers	Nominated	
6th South Indian International Movie Awards	SIIMA Award for Best Director (Telugu)	Koratala Siva	Nominated	
6th South Indian International Movie Awards	SIIMA Award for Best Actor (Telugu)	N. T. Rama Rao Jr.	Won	
6th South Indian International Movie Awards	SIIMA Award for Best Supporting Actor (Telugu)	Mohanlal	Nominated	
6th South Indian International Movie Awards	Best Playback Singer – Male	Shankar Mahadevan (for "Pranaamam")	Nominated	
6th South Indian International Movie Awards	Best Playback Singer – Female	Geetha Madhuri (for "Pakka Local")	Nominated	
6th South Indian International Movie Awards	SIIMA Award for Best Music Director (Telugu)	Devi Sri Prasad	Won	
6th South Indian International Movie Awards	SIIMA Award for Best Lyricist (Telugu)	Ramajogayya Sastry (for "Pranaamam")	Won	
2nd IIFA Utsavam	Best Picture	Mythri Movie Makers	Won	
2nd IIFA Utsavam	Best Director	Koratala Siva	Won	
2nd IIFA Utsavam	Best Actor	N. T. Rama Rao Jr.	Won	
2nd IIFA Utsavam	Best Supporting Actor	Mohanlal	Nominated	
2nd IIFA Utsavam	Best Music Direction	Devi Sri Prasad	Won	
2nd IIFA Utsavam	Best Lyrics	Ramajogayya Sastry (for "Pranaamam")	Won	
2nd IIFA Utsavam	Best Playback Singer – Male	Shankar Mahadevan (for "Pranaamam")	Nominated	
2nd IIFA Utsavam	Best Playback Singer – Female	Geetha Madhuri (for "Pakka Local")	Won	
