= Koratala Siva =

Indian filmmaker (born 1975)

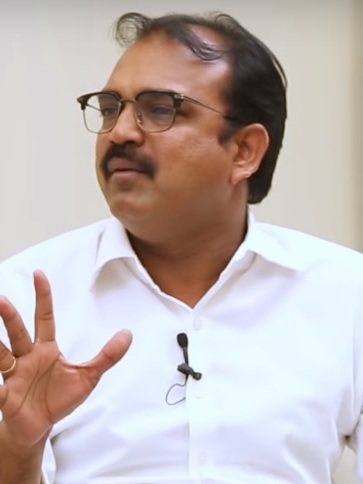
- Koratala Siva in 2018
- Born: 15 June 1975 (age 51); Pedakakani, Andhra Pradesh, India
- Occupations: Film director; screenwriter
- Years active: 2003–present
- Relatives: Posani Krishna Murali

Koratala Siva (born 15 June 1975) is an Indian film director and screenwriter who works in Telugu cinema. Siva has directed films such as Mirchi (2013), Srimanthudu (2015), Janatha Garage (2016), Bharat Ane Nenu (2018), and Devara: Part 1 (2024). He has received two Nandi Awards and an IIFA Utsavam Award for his directional works.

== Early life and start-up career ==
Born into a family of social activists with communist ideologies, he began his early career working in the information technology industry as a software engineer. He then worked as a screenwriting assistant for films under his uncle, Posani Krishna Murali. Subsequently, he ventured into Telugu film industry as a dialogue writer for films such as Okkadunnadu, Bhadra, Munna, Brindavanam, and Oosaravelli.

== Directorial career ==
In 2013, he made his film directorial debut with Mirchi starring Prabhas which was a box-office success. In 2015, he directed action-drama film Srimanthudu, which was a commercial success, and has received three Filmfare Awards South, six IIFA Awards, and six SIIMA Awards.

His 2016 film Janatha Garage starred Mohanlal and N. T. Rama Rao Jr. The story follows Sathyam (Mohanlal) a mechanic operating a large automobile service center named "Janatha Garage" and undertaking vigilantism through their group of automobile mechanics, because the legal agencies were thought to be inadequate. The film grossed estimated ₹140 crore and earned a distributor's share amount of ₹70 crore in its first week of release. Koratala scored his third consecutive success as a director with the film. He returned to direct actor Mahesh Babu in the political action drama film Bharat Ane Nenu and continued his success streak at the box-office, with the film grossing ₹164 crore at the box-office.

In early 2020, Koratala started filming his next directional, Acharya with Chiranjeevi and Ram Charan in the lead. The film, released in April 2022, received negative reviews and ended up as the poorest performing film at the box office in Koratala's career.

In 2024, Koratala has directed a film with NTR Jr titled Devara, which marked their second collaboration after Janatha Garage. It was produced by Nandamuri Kalyan Ram and Mikkilineni Sudhakar under N. T. R. Arts and Yuvasudha Arts, respectively. Devara received mixed reviews from critics but was a major box office success, grossing over ₹450 crore worldwide. Following this, he is slated to work with Allu Arjun and Nandamuri Balakrishna.

== Filmography ==
Key
†	Denotes films that have not yet been released

=== As director and screenwriter ===
Year	Title	Notes
2013	Mirchi	
2015	Srimanthudu	
2016	Janatha Garage	
2018	Bharat Ane Nenu	
2022	Acharya	
2024	Devara: Part 1	
TBA	NBK112 †	

=== As writer only ===
Year	Title	Credits	Notes
2002	Girl Friend	Story	Co-written with B. V. S. Ravi
2005	Bhadra	Dialogue	
2007	Okkadunnadu	Dialogue	
2007	Munna	Dialogue	Co-written with B. V. S. Ravi
2010	Brindavanam	Dialogue	
2011	Oosaravelli	Dialogue	

=== As presenter ===
Year	Title	Notes
2024	Krishnamma	

== Frequent collaborators ==
Collaborator	Mirchi (2013)	Srimanthudu (2015)	Janatha Garage (2016)	Bharat Ane Nenu (2018)	Acharya (2022)	Devara: Part 1 (2024)
Ramajogayya Sastry	Yes	Yes	Yes	Yes	Yes	Yes
Devi Sri Prasad	Yes	Yes	Yes	Yes		
Ajay	Yes		Yes	Yes	Yes	Yes
Mahesh Babu		Yes		Yes	Narrator	
Vennela Kishore		Yes	Yes		Yes	
Banerjee	Yes		Yes	Yes	Yes	
Raghu Babu	Yes		Yes		Yes	
Ravi Prakash		Yes	Yes		Yes	
Rajitha		Yes	Yes	Yes		
Surya		Yes	Yes	Yes		
Appaji Ambarisha Darbha		Yes	Yes	Yes		
Kotagiri Venkateshwara Rao	Yes	Yes	Yes			
Tirru			Yes	Yes	Yes	
Anal Arasu	Yes	Yes	Yes			
N. T. Rama Rao Jr.			Yes			Yes
R. Madhi	Yes	Yes				

== Awards ==
Film	Awards	Category	Result	Ref.
Mirchi	Nandi Awards of 2013	Best First Film of a Director	Won	
Mirchi	61st Filmfare Awards South	Best Director	Nominated	
Mirchi	3rd SIIMA	Best Director – Telugu	Nominated	
Srimanthudu	63rd Filmfare Awards South	Best Director – Telugu	Nominated	
Srimanthudu	IIFA Utsavam 2015	Best Director – Telugu	Nominated	
Srimanthudu	5th SIIMA	Best Director – Telugu	Nominated	
Srimanthudu	14th Santosham Film Awards	Best Director	Won	
Janatha Garage	Nandi Awards of 2016	Best Story Writer	Won	
Janatha Garage	64th Filmfare Awards South	Best Director – Telugu	Nominated	
Janatha Garage	6th SIIMA	Best Director – Telugu	Nominated	
Janatha Garage	2nd IIFA Utsavam	Best Director – Telugu	Won	
Bharat Ane Nenu	Zee Cine Awards Telugu	Best Dialogues	Won	
Bharat Ane Nenu	66th Filmfare Awards South	Best Director – Telugu	Nominated	
