= Virodhi =

Virodhi may refer to:

- Virodhi (1992 film), a 1992 Indian Bollywood (Hindi) film produced and directed by Rajkumar Kohli
- Virodhi (2011 film), a 2011 Indian Telugu film directed by G. Neelakanta Reddy
