= Santhi Nivasam (TV series) =

Telugu television series (2000–2001)

- Genre: Drama; Family
- Story by: S. S. Rajamouli; Chaitanya
- Directed by: S. S. Rajamouli; Anil Kishore; Vara Mullapudi
- Starring: Ranganath; Sameer; Rajeev Kanakala; Telangana Sakunthala
- Country of origin: India
- Original language: Telugu
- No. of episodes: 273

Production
- Producer: K. Raghavendra Rao
- Cinematography: Kunapareddy Srinivas
- Editor: Hemanth
- Running time: 18–24 minutes
- Production company: RK Teleshow

Original release
- Network: ETV
- Release: 2000 – 2001

Santhi Nivasam is an Indian Telugu-language television drama series that aired on ETV from 2000 to 2001, spanning 273 episodes. Directed by S. S. Rajamouli in his directorial debut, the series follows Raghavayya, the patriarch of a large family living in a house named Santhi Nivasam, as they navigate familial conflicts, relationships, and societal challenges. Produced by K. Raghavendra Rao under his banner RK Teleshow, the series played a key role in shaping Rajamouli's career, laying the foundation for his transition to feature films.

The show featured an ensemble cast, including Ranganath, Sameer, Rajeev Kanakala, and Harsha Vardhan, with music composed by M. M. Srilekha and lyrics by Chandrabose. After Rajamouli transitioned to directing Student No. 1 (2001), Vara Mullapudi took over the direction of the series. The show was well-received during its broadcast and is regarded as an early success in Rajamouli's career. Although plans for a film adaptation were announced, the project was ultimately shelved.

== Plot ==
The series follows Raghavayya, the patriarch of a large family living in a house named Santhi Nivasam. The narrative explores the complexities of familial relationships and the challenges faced by the family, including thefts, misunderstandings, and interpersonal conflicts. Raghavayya strives to maintain harmony within the household while upholding moral values, but the family frequently encounters dramatic twists and societal pressures.

Central to the story are Raghavayya's children who, along with other family members, navigate personal struggles and collective conflicts. Notable events include Adarsh risking his life to save Anand, Dharma Das plotting to harm the family, and Raghavayya confronting financial and social challenges. The series delves into themes of sacrifice, morality, and the enduring strength of family bonds.

== Cast ==
=== Main ===
- Ranganath as Raghavayya, the head of the family
- Sameer as Anand, Raghavayya's son
- Rajeev Kanakala as Adarsh
- Harsha Vardhan
- L. Jhansi
- S. Sravani
- Telangana Sakunthala

=== Recurring ===
- Hema
- Sivannarayana Naripeddi
- Srinivasa Reddy
- Chatrapathi Sekhar
- Raghu Kunche
- Sri Ramya

== Production ==
Santhi Nivasam was directed by S. S. Rajamouli, who dedicated approximately one and a half years to the project, working up to 17 hours a day. Rajamouli later described this period as one of the most challenging of his career, during which he gained a reputation as a "workaholic." This project marked Rajamouli's first directorial credit, with his name appearing on screen for the first time in Santhi Nivasam. After Rajamouli transitioned to directing Student No. 1 (2001), Vara Mullapudi took over the direction of the series.

The series was produced by K. Raghavendra Rao for ETV, which was headed by Ramoji Rao. Rajamouli worked under the mentorship of K. Raghavendra Rao, who oversaw the story, screenplay, and direction. Vara Mullapudi, son of noted writer Mullapudi Venkata Ramana, joined the team during production, collaborating closely with Rajamouli and Raghavendra Rao.

A notable incident during filming involved a disagreement between Rajamouli and lead actor Ranganath over a particular scene. The issue was resolved amicably, with Ranganath later acknowledging Rajamouli's potential as a filmmaker.

== Music ==
The music for Santhi Nivasam was composed by M. M. Srilekha, with lyrics written by Chandrabose. The songs were sung by S. P. Balasubrahmanyam and M. M. Srilekha.

== Planned adaptation ==
The final episode of Santhi Nivasam (episode 273) announced plans for a feature film adaptation, produced by Usha Kiran Movies.

In March 2002, reports confirmed that the television series would be remade into a film, marking a unique instance in Telugu cinema where a TV serial was adapted for the big screen. The film adaptation was set to feature the original cast and crew, including actors Ranganath, Sameer, Harsha Vardhan, Rajeev Kanakala, L. Jhansi, and S. Sravani, who had all appeared in the television series. To expedite the project, two units were reported to be working simultaneously on the film from 1 April 2002 to 19 April 2002, with plans to complete shooting by April 19. The adaptation was to be jointly directed by Sunil Varma and V. S. Reddy, with music composed by M. M. Srilekha. The story, screenplay, and direction supervision were to be provided by K. Raghavendra Rao, with Ramoji Rao serving as the producer.

However, despite these efforts, the film adaptation ultimately did not materialize.

== Legacy ==
Santhi Nivasam is remembered as a stepping stone in the career of S. S. Rajamouli, providing him an opportunity to develop his directorial skills under the mentorship of K. Raghavendra Rao. The success of the show played a crucial role in his transition to feature films. His debut film, Student No. 1 (2001), featured several actors from the serial, including Rajeev Kanakala, Sameer, Sivannarayana Naripeddi, and Chatrapathi Sekhar, further linking the two projects. In the Netflix documentary series Modern Masters: S. S. Rajamouli (2024), the director reflected on his work in Santhi Nivasam and credited the experience with shaping his storytelling skills and building his confidence for feature filmmaking.

The serial also earned Rajamouli the nickname "Jakkanna." Actor Rajeev Kanakala, who worked with him on Santhi Nivasam, likened his meticulous approach to directing to that of the legendary c.12th-century sculptor Jakanachari (known as Jakkanna in Telugu). This comparison led the cast and crew to affectionately call him "Jakkanna," a name that has since become synonymous with the director.

In later interviews, Rajamouli acknowledged the success of Santhi Nivasam but expressed dissatisfaction with his direction, attributing its popularity to its prime time slot and association with established filmmakers rather than to his creative merits. Comparing it to other contemporary serials like Pinni and Kasthuri, he remarked that Santhi Nivasam was a weaker effort. Despite this, the series remains an important milestone in his early career and contributed significantly to his storytelling approach.
