= Sri Ramya =

Indian actress

- Occupation: Actress
- Years active: 1997–2013
- Notable work: 1940 Lo Oka Gramam (2008)
- Relatives: Sri Divya (sister)

Sri Ramya is a former Indian actress, who predominantly acts in Telugu films. She made her acting debut by the film 1940 Lo Oka Gramam in 2010, for which she won the Nandi Special Jury Award in 2008.

== Early life and career ==
Sri Ramya worked as a child actress in several Telugu serials including Ruthuragalu alongside her younger sister Sri Divya and Santi Nivasam. She studied at Kendriya Vidyalaya and later worked as a classical dancer. She made her feature film acting debut with the Telugu film 1940 Lo Oka Gramam in 2008 for which she tonsured her head. Three years later after her hair grew back, she acted as a naxalite in the film Virodhi. She played the lead role in a solo Tamil film titled Yamuna in 2013. Regarding her performance in the film, critics felt that she was "competent".

== Filmography ==
- Note: all films are in Telugu, unless otherwise noted.

Year	Title	Role	Note
2008	1940 Lo Oka Gramam	Susheela	Won—Nandi Special Jury Award
2011	Virodhi	Maina	
2013	Alias Janaki	Priya	
2013	Yamuna	Yamuna	Tamil film

=== Television ===
Year	Show	Role	Network
1997–2000	Ruthuragalu		DD Saptagiri
2000–2001	Santhi Nivasam		ETV
	Chakra Vakam		
	Kasthuri		
	Teertham		
