= They Call Him OG =

2025 Indian film by Sujeeth

- Theatrical release poster
- Directed by: Sujeeth
- Written by: Sujeeth
- Produced by: D. V. V. Danayya; Kalyan Dasari
- Starring: Pawan Kalyan; Emraan Hashmi; Prakash Raj; Priyanka Mohan; Arjun Das; Sudev Nair; Sriya Reddy; Vincent Asokan; Kazuki Kitamura
- Narrated by: Arjun Das
- Cinematography: Ravi K. Chandran; Manoj Paramahamsa
- Edited by: Naveen Nooli
- Music by: Thaman S
- Production company: DVV Entertainment
- Distributed by: see below
- Release date: 25 September 2025
- Running time: 154 minutes
- Country: India
- Language: Telugu
- Budget: ₹200–250 crore
- Box office: ₹293–300 crore (Note: They Call Him OG grossed ₹293.65 crore (News18; The Telegraph) – ₹294 crore (Daily News and Analysis) – ₹300 crore (The Economic Times))

They Call Him OG (simply known as OG) is a 2025 Indian Telugu-language crime action drama film written and directed by Sujeeth, and produced by D. V. V. Danayya and Kalyan Dasari. It stars Pawan Kalyan in the titular role, alongside an ensemble cast including Emraan Hashmi, Prakash Raj, Priyanka Mohan, Arjun Das, Sudev Nair, Sriya Reddy, Vincent Asokan, Kazuki Kitamura, Shaam, Tej Sapru, Harish Uthaman, Saurav Lokesh, Subhalekha Sudhakar and Abhimanyu Singh. The film follows Ojas Gambheera, a retired gangster who returns to Bombay in 1993 after a decade to face a powerful crime lord Omi Bhau.

A few months after it was officially announced in December 2022, principal photography of They Call Him OG began in April 2023 and March 2024 in Mumbai. Filming experienced several delays due to Kalyan's political commitments, and concluded in July 2025. The film has music composed by Thaman S, cinematography jointly handled by Ravi K. Chandran and Manoj Paramahamsa and editing by Naveen Nooli.

They Call Him OG was released worldwide in theatres on 25 September 2025, to mixed reviews but setting the biggest opening day in India in 2025 by grossing ₹155 crores worldwide on its opening day. It emerged as the ninth-highest grossing Indian film of 2025 and the highest grossing Telugu film of 2025.

== Plot ==
In 1970s Japan, the Yakuza raid a Samurai dojo, massacring all but one student. The sole survivor, a young Ojas Gambheera 'OG', escapes and boards a ship on its way to Bombay. Also via that ship, Telugu and Marathi businessmen Satyanarayana 'Satya Dada' and Vardhaman Mirajkar are transporting a large cache of gold bars, with which they intend to build a private port in Colaba, Bombay. On board, Gambheera rescues Satya Dada and Mirajkar from a violent gang of thieves, killing them all with his katana. Later, Gambheera, impressed by Satya Dada's intentions to help people with his port, pledges fealty to him. Over the next few years, Satya Dada's port is established and thrives, in part thanks to the protection Gambheera offers. However, Mirajkar breaks his partnership with Satya Dada and intends to take over the port by any means necessary, becoming his fierce rival in the process.

In 1993, the gangster Jimmy, Vardhaman Mirajkar's son, insists on smuggling a container of RDX explosives via the Colaba port, even though he is warned that Satya Dada will not tolerate it. When Satya Dada's younger son, Pardhu arrives to inspect the container, he and his team are all killed in a gunfight by Jimmy's gang. The next morning, Vardhaman Mirajkar, now a minister, is distraught to learn that his son has killed Pardhu. After the funeral, Mirajkar explains his anxiety to an unrepentant Jimmy. Back in 1978, when Mirajkar was a crime lord, his gang stormed the Colaba port and tried to extricate its ownership from Satya Dada at gunpoint. However, his plan was thwarted by Gambheera, who massacred dozens of Mirajkar's men. Mirajkar is now terrified that the Baagul Bua might be unleashed upon Jimmy for killing Satya Dada's son.

As tensions arise, the act creates a power vacuum, drawing the attention of the ruthless crime lord, Omi Bhau. As Omi Bhau attempts to consolidate power over the Bombay ports once held by Satya Dada, he learns of Ojas's survival. The battle turns tragic when Omi Bhau's men launch a targeted attack in a hospital, where Satya Dada is present. However, it results in the death of Ojas's wife, Kanmani. The loss of his wife enrages Gambheera. Gambheera saves Satya Dada and kills Jimmy after an assasinationn attempt. After Kanmani's funeral, he returns to Bombay and confronts Omi, as well as revealing his past where he attacked Satya Dada's brother in Waaji City, causing him to send his son away for his safety.

As the conflict intensifies, Arjun, a young man seeking answers, learns the truth regarding his own father's death. It is revealed that Ojas was not the killer that Arjun believed him to be, but he was actually the one who tried to save him. This event led him to his 15-year exile. The final confrontation takes place after Omi holds Ojas's daughter as a hostage. Omi Bhau arrives with a massive army of mercenaries, believing he has Ojas outnumbered. However, the tide turns when a legion of disciplined Samurai warriors arrives to defend Ojas. It is revealed that during his years in exile, Ojas had been secretly training a new generation of warriors in the traditional arts of his Japanese heritage. In a high-octane climax involving traditional swordsmanship and modern warfare, Ojas engages Omi Bhau in a final duel. Ojas emerges victorious, ending Omi's reign of terror. Arjun takes over the family business from Satya Dada, supported by Geetha. Ojas tells him that he will come back to Bombay if the need arises while taking his daughter away from the city, as per Kanmani's wish.

== Cast ==
- Pawan Kalyan as Ojas Gambheera / Master Orochi Genshin "OG"
  - Aakash Srinivas as young OG
- Emraan Hashmi as Omkar Vardhaman Mirajkar "Omi Bhau" (voiceover by Hemachandra)
- Prakash Raj as Satyanarayana Roy Nandan "Satya Dada"
- Priyanka Mohan as Dr. Kanmani, Ojas' wife
- Arjun Das as Arjun, Chakri’s son
- Sriya Reddy as Geetha, Chakri’s wife and Arjun's mother
- Sudev Nair as Jimmy Vardhaman Mirajkar, Mirajkar's younger son and Omi's brother
- Vincent Asokan as David Abraham, a crime syndicate leader and Omi's boss (loosely based on Dawood Ibrahim)
- Subhalekha Sudhakar as Dharani
- Rahul Ravindran as Bhadra
- Abhimanyu Singh as Inspector Tawde
- Tej Sapru as Vardhaman Mirajkar, Omi and Jimmy's father
- Harish Uthaman as Dheenanath "Dheena"
- Satya Prakash as Pathan, Mirajkar's henchman
- Kazuki Kitamura as Kazao, Yakuza leader
- Sayesha Shah as Tara, Ojas and Kanmani’s daughter
- Shaam as Chakravarthy "Chakri" Roy Nandan, Satya Dada's elder son
- Srikanth Iyengar as Satya Dada’s port worker
- Venkat as Parthasarathi "Pardhu" Roy Nandan, Satya Dada's younger son
- Ajay Ghosh as Gossiper
- Rajendran as Gossiper
- Jeeva as Gossiper
- Salim Baig as Omi's henchman
- Saurav Lokesh as Shabra, David’s assistant
- Upendra Limaye as Chief Minister

Cameo appearances

- Vithaya Pansringarm as Sensei, Gambheera's master and father-figure
- Jackie Shroff as Narantak Roy Nandan, Satyanarayana's younger brother
- Lal as Ibrahim, Narantak's bodyguard and righthand man
- Suhas as Arms Supplier
- Keiichi Ando as Toshiro, Kazao’s henchmen
- Neha Shetty as a dancer in the song "Kiss Kiss Bang Bang"

== Production ==
=== Development ===
During the filming of Hari Hara Veera Mallu in late 2022, it was reported that Sujeeth had met Pawan Kalyan and narrated a script which impressed the actor. That December, Sujeeth officially announced that he would collaborate with Kalyan for his venture titled They Call Him OG after Hari Hara Veera Mallu. The project was funded by D. V. V. Danayya's DVV Entertainment with a reported production budget of ₹250 crore. Kalyan was reported to receive ₹100 crore for remuneration. Cinematographer Ravi K. Chandran, music composer Thaman S and production designer A.S. Prakash were chosen as a part of the crew. A muhuratam puja ceremony was held on 30 January 2023 at a studio in Hyderabad with the presence of the film's cast and crew. Later, Sujeeth began location scouting for the film with cinematographer Ravi K. Chandran and production designer A.S. Prakash at Flora Fountain in Mumbai.

=== Casting ===
Priyanka Mohan was cast as the female lead, while Emraan Hashmi was cast as the antagonist, marking his debut in Telugu cinema. Arjun Das, Sriya Reddy, Harish Uthaman, and Prakash Raj were cast in supporting roles.

=== Filming ===
Principal photography began with the first schedule on 15 April 2023 in Mumbai. Kalyan joined the sets in same month. The first schedule was wrapped up on 2 May 2023. Some scenes between Priyanka Mohan and Kalyan were shot in Pune. The second schedule began on 18 May 2023 in Hyderabad. The third schedule began on 4 June 2023. Emraan Hashmi joined the sets with this schedule. This schedule was completed on 26 June 2023. The fourth schedule started on 11 July 2023.

The film's shoot was halted for several months due to Kalyan's political campaign in 2024 Andhra Pradesh Legislative Assembly election. Following his appointment as Deputy Chief Minister of Andhra Pradesh, the film resumed its shoot in October 2024 in Hyderabad. However, shooting came to a halt again owing to the political responsibilities of Kalyan. After months of instability, production resumed on 14 May 2025 with Kalyan. The portions of Kalyan's role were wrapped up on 7 June 2025. The entire filming was wrapped up by July 2025.

== Music ==
The film's soundtrack is composed by Thaman S in his maiden collaboration with Sujeeth and fourth collaboration with Pawan Kalyan after Vakeel Saab, Bheemla Nayak and Bro. The music rights were acquired by Sony Music India.

The first single, titled "Firestorm" was released on 2 August 2025. The second single, titled "Suvvi Suvvi" was released on 27 August 2025. The third single titled "Trance Of Omi" was released on 11 September 2025. The fourth single titled "Guns N' Roses" was released on 15 September 2025. The fifth single titled "Washi Yo Washi" which was a Japanese haiku was released on 19 September 2025.

== Marketing ==
The film's glimpse titled "Hungry Cheetah", was released on 2 September 2023, coinciding with Pawan Kalyan's 52nd birthday. Another glimpse titled "HBD OG - Love Omi" was released on 2 September 2025, coinciding with Kalyan's 54th birthday. A grand pre-release event was held on 21 September 2025 in LB Stadium, Hyderabad. However, the trailer was delayed and a raw footage of the trailer was shown which was later leaked on social media. The trailer was later officially released on 22 September 2025.

The film partnered with the AI fan engagement platform Once More (OnceMore.io) for a collective fan challenge, which led to the platform registering one million users in 42 hours in late September 2025.

== Release ==
=== Theatrical ===
They Call Him OG was released worldwide on 25 September 2025. The film was originally scheduled to release on 27 September 2024 but was postponed indefinitely due to production delays and Kalyan's political campaign before finalizing the current date. The film received an "A" (adults only) certificate from the Central Board of Film Certification, who demanded nearly two minutes of material be trimmed due to graphic violence.

=== Distribution ===
The Tamil Nadu distribution rights were acquired by Think Studios. The North American distributing rights were acquired by Prathyangira Cinemas. The United Kingdom distribution rights were acquired by DreamZ Entertainment. 4 Seasons Creations AS is responsible for the film's distribution rights in several European countries.

=== Home Media ===
The post-theatrical streaming rights of the film were acquired by Netflix for ₹96 crores. It began streaming on the platform from 23 October 2025 in Telugu and dubbed versions of Hindi, Tamil, Kannada and Malayalam languages.

== Reception ==
=== Critical response ===
Divya Shree of The Times of India gave 3/5 stars and wrote "Director Sujeeth leans heavily on star power, often at the cost of layered storytelling and character arcs. Several subplots are undercooked, and familiar tropes such as the wife’s murder and the daughter’s kidnapping feel formulaic. [...] The film has its shortcomings in emotional depth and narrative finesse, but it still succeeds as a stylish action drama with flair." Shrishti Negi of News 18 gave 3/5 stars and wrote "Overall, They Call Him OG is a mass entertainer powered by Pawan Kalyan’s swag. Come for the action and aura, stay for the spectacle but lower expectations on story depth." Swaroop Kodur of The Indian Express gave 3/5 stars and wrote "They Call Him OG is an entertaining film made for hardcore fans, by a hardcore fan himself. Yet, in that pursuit, Sujeeth forgoes the opportunity to take a few risks, and he only goes so far as charming us with his (and his team’s) technical brilliance." Goutham S of Pinkvilla gave 2.5/5 stars and wrote "They Call Him OG is a love letter from a fan to his idol. Every scene exists to please the inner soul of every fan, and in that regard, it hits the mark. However, the lack of creativity and originality is evident, leaving little for the general audience to enjoy."

Janani K of India Today gave 2.5/5 stars and wrote "They Call Him OG has its moments, each executed to perfection. But, beyond those pure theatrical moments, the story remains a familiar and predictable tale about the underworld and gangsters." Neeshita Nyayapati of Hindustan Times gave 2.5/5 stars and wrote "They Call Him OG is a good homage to Pawan’s stardom from Sujeeth, but that doesn’t necessarily mean it’s a good film. You’ve seen this story a million times before, and Ram Gopal Varma definitely did it better in his prime." Sangeetha Devi Dundoo of The Hindu wrote "While the story isn’t new, adding more depth and addressing a few plot holes could have helped. The film relies heavily on the larger-than-life hero trope: OG appears just in time to save loved ones, often in ways that demand more than mere suspension of disbelief. [...] OG aims to tell the story of a Samurai-like hero protecting his people and city, but ultimately, it becomes a film prioritising style and fan service over substance."

=== Box office ===
The film grossed ₹155 crores worldwide on its opening day and ₹100 crores in the domestic box office. In North America, the film also unexpectedly grossed $3.13 million in the Wednesday premieres, becoming the second-highest premier grosser in the region after Kalki 2898 AD (2024) for Telugu cinema. DVV Entertainment announced that the film grossed 308 crores in 21 days. In North America alone, the film grossed $5.8 million and became the eighth-highest grossing Telugu film in the region. Overall overseas is around $7.33 million.

== Future ==
A prequel and sequel, titled They Call Him OG II, was also revealed in the end credits of the film. On June 25, 2026, Sujeeth and Kalyan officially announced the production of a sequel, which will expand the universe to establish the OG Universe.
