= IIFA Utsavam Award for Best Director – Telugu =

Indian award for Telugu language films

- Awarded for: Best Direction in Telugu films
- Country: India
- First award: 2015
- Currently held by: Anil Ravipudi, Bhagavanth Kesari (2023)

Highlights
- Most nominations: Koratala Siva (2)
- Website: iifautsavam.com

IIFA Utsavam Award for Best Director – Telugu is given by the International Indian Film Academy in South Indian segment which is known as IIFA Utsavam. It recognises the most outstanding director as part of annual ceremony for Telugu films.

== Superlatives ==
Categories	Recipient	Record
Most nominations	Koratala Siva	2

== Winners and nominees ==
Table key
‡	Indicates the winner

Year	Director	Film	Ref.
2015 (1st)	S. S. Rajamouli ‡	Baahubali: The Beginning	
2015 (1st)	Chandoo Mondeti	Karthikeya	
2015 (1st)	Koratala Siva	Srimanthudu	
2015 (1st)	Mahi V. Raghav	Paathasala	
2015 (1st)	Puri Jagannadh	Temper	
2016 (2nd)	Koratala Siva ‡	Janatha Garage	
2016 (2nd)	Krish Jagarlamudi	Kanche	
2016 (2nd)	Sukumar	Nannaku Prematho	
2016 (2nd)	Tharun Bhascker	Pelli Choopulu	
2016 (2nd)	Vamshi Paidipally	Oopiri	
2023 (3rd)	Anil Ravipudi ‡	Bhagavanth Kesari	
2023 (3rd)	Mahesh Babu Pachigolla	Miss Shetty Mr Polishetty	
2023 (3rd)	Prashanth Neel	Salaar: Part 1 – Ceasefire	
2023 (3rd)	Sai Rajesh	Baby	
2023 (3rd)	Srikanth Odela	Dasara	
