= Alias Janaki =

2013 Indian Telugu film by Daya K

- Official poster
- Directed by: Daya K
- Written by: Dialogue: Vamsi Krishna Gadwala; Vashishta Sharma
- Produced by: Neelima Tirumalasetti
- Starring: Rahul Venkat; Anisha Ambrose
- Cinematography: Sujith Sarang
- Edited by: Sreejith Sarang
- Music by: Shravan
- Release date: 26 July 2013
- Country: India
- Language: Telugu

Alias Janaki is a 2013 Indian Telugu language romantic drama film directed by Daya K and starring newcomers Rahul Venkat and Anisha Ambrose. The film released theatrically and online on 26 July 2013.

== Cast ==
- Rahul Venkat as Janaki Ram
- Anisha Ambrose as Chaitra
- Sri Ramya as Priyadarshini
- Naga Babu as Janaki Ram's father
- Tanikella Bharani as Janaki Ram's superior officer
- Sivannarayana Naripeddi as Kashi
- Sandhya Janak as Kashi's wife
- Shatru as Mysa

== Production ==
The film began production starring Rahul Venkat (Chiranjeevi's cousin) and Nisha Aggarwal. Aggarwal was later replaced with debutante Anisha Ambrose.

== Soundtrack ==
Music by newcomer Shravan. Karthik Pasupulate of The Times of India gave the music a rating of thee out of five stars and said that "Debutante music director Shravan has packed in a refreshing new vibe in the album". The soundtrack was released through Aditya Music.

Track list
No.	Title	Lyrics	Singer(s)	Length
1.	"Kaadhal Prema"	Swechha	Shravan	3:16
2.	"Maarinade (Haricharan)"	Karthik Kodakadha	Haricharan	4:40
3.	"Konchem Konchem"	Swechha	Shravan, Kavya	3:21
4.	"Aranyamantha"	Krishna Kanth	Balaram Iyer	3:23
5.	"Santhalo Perigina Sundari"	Surendra Krishna	Sravana Bhargavi	3:42
6.	"Kaatuka Kannula"	Karthik Kodakadha, Ashwin	Sai Charan	3:17
7.	"Maarinade"	Karthik Kodakadha, Ashwin	Guna	2:48
8.	"Konchem Konchem Remix"	Swechha	Sandeep	3:46
Total length:				28:16

== Release and reception ==
A critic from The Times of India opined that "It’s a little too loaded and preachy, besides some shallow intensity and noble intentions it has nothing much to offer".

== Awards ==
Nandi Awards

- Best Film on National Integration
- Best Director – Daya Kodavaganti
