= A.S. Prakash =

Indian film production designer

A. S. Prakash
- Born: Vishakapatnam
- Occupations: Art director, production designer
- Years active: 2003–present
- Awards: Nandi Award for Best Art Director (2013, 2016)

A. S. Prakash is an Indian art director and who predominantly works in Telugu cinema. He is a two-time recipient of the Nandi Award for Best Art Director.

== Early life ==
Prakash is a native of Visakhapatnam and completed his post-graduation in Fine Arts from Andhra University. He began his career by assisting art director Nitish Roy and drawing sketches at Ramoji Film City.

== Career ==
Prakash made his debut as an independent art director in 2003 with Oka Raju Oka Rani. He gained wider recognition for his elaborate sets in the 2013 blockbuster Mirchi (film).

For the 2016 film Janatha Garage, he designed a massive garage set after researching real garages across Andhra Pradesh and Telangana, incorporating over 500 trees and sourcing furniture from Tamil Nadu. This work earned him his second Nandi Award for Best Art Director.

In 2020, Prakash created the grand sets for Ala Vaikunthapurramuloo. For Sarkaru Vaari Paata (2022), his seventh collaboration with Mahesh Babu, he erected eight major indoor sets representing different eras, including a full recreation of a Vizag street in Hyderabad.

Prakash also worked on Waltair Veerayya (2023) and The Family Star (2024). As of 2026, his projects include Vishwambhara and Bhartha Mahasayulaku Wignyapthi.

== Filmography ==
Year	Title	Credit
2003	Oka Raju Oka Rani	Art Director
2006	Bommarillu	Art Director
2007	Dubai Seenu	Art Director
2008	King (2008 film)	Art Director
2009	Billa (2009 film)	Art Director
2011	Dookudu	Art Director
2013	Mirchi (film)	Art Director
2015	Srimanthudu	Art Director
2016	Janatha Garage	Art Director
2018	Aravinda Sametha Veera Raghava	Art Director
2018	Bharat Ane Nenu	Art Director
2019	Chitralahari (film)	Art Director
2019	F2: Fun and Frustration	Art Director
2019	Vinaya Vidheya Rama	Art Director
2020	Ala Vaikunthapurramuloo	Art Director
2020	Sarileru Neekevvaru	Art Director
2021	Gaali Sampath	Art Director
2021	Krack (film)	Art Director
2021	Varudu Kaavalenu	Art Director
2022	Aadavallu Meeku Johaarlu (2022 film)	Art Director
2022	Sarkaru Vaari Paata	Production Designer
2022	Bheemla Nayak	Production Designer
2022	F3 (film)	Production Designer
2023	Waltair Veerayya	Production Designer
2023	Veera Simha Reddy	Production Designer
2023	Aadikeshava	Art Director / Production Designer
2023	Rangabali (film)	Art Director
2023	Skanda (film)	Production Designer
2023	Bhola Shankar	Production Designer
2023	Bro (2023 film)	Production Designer
2024	Guntur Kaaram	Art Director / Production Designer
2024	The Family Star	Art Director / Production Designer
2024	Tillu Square	Production Designer
2024	RT4GM	Art Director
2025	Akhanda 2: Thaandavam	Art Director
2025	They Call Him OG	Production Designer
2026	Mana Shankara Vara Prasad Garu	Production Designer
2026	Bhartha Mahasayulaku Wignyapthi	Production Designer
2026	Aadarsha Kutumbam House No: 47 - AK47	Production Designer
TBA	Vishwambhara	Production Designer

== Awards ==
Year	Award	Film	Result
2013	Nandi Award for Best Art Director	Mirchi (film)	Won
2016	Nandi Award for Best Art Director	Janatha Garage	Won
