= Kamalatho Naa Prayanam =

- Theatrical release poster
- Directed by: Narasimha Nandi
- Written by: Narasimha Nandi
- Based on: Oori Chivara Illu by Tilak
- Produced by: Isanaka Sunil Reddy; Siddharth Bogulu
- Starring: Sivaji; Archana
- Cinematography: S. Murali Mohan Reddy
- Edited by: V. Nagi Reddy
- Music by: Kishan Kavadiya (aka KK)
- Production company: Livitha Universal Films
- Release date: 1 June 2014
- Country: India
- Language: Telugu

Kamalatho Naa Prayanam is a 2014 Indian Telugu-language film directed by Narasimha Nandi. This film produced by Livitha Universal Films and features Sivaji and Archana in the lead roles. It is about a woman who is striving to get out of her job as a sex worker and the betrayal she faced from the person she loved after believing rumors about her private life.

KK composed the music while S. Murali Mohan Reddy handled the cinematography of the film. V. Nagi Reddy provided the editing for the film. The film was launched on 1 June 2013 in Hyderabad.

== Cast ==
- Sivaji as Suryanarayana
- Archana as Kamala Rani
- Pavala Syamala

== Production ==
The film was formally launched at Hyderabad on 1 June 2013 at Hyderabad. In an interaction to the media in early June 2013, Narasimha Nandi, about the film, spoke "The story is set against the 1950 backdrop and shows how all her efforts to lead a normal life fail and she takes her life after the only man whom she trusts also betrays her. The film is being shot in Rajamundry and Hyderabad."

Later, in an interview to the media, Sivaji spoke about his character in the film. He spoke "I change the way I look — from the clothes I wear to my dressing to my moustache, hair styling. A military man who works in the Burmese Army, comes hunting for a friend and meets a girl called Kamala and falls for her." He also added "The entire film was shot in rain from the first frame to the last frame. Wherever there was water we would stop and shoot there. We must have used water from many lakes".

== Soundtrack ==
Kishan Kavadiya aka KK composed the Music for the film while Vanamali penned the lyrics for all the songs. In early January 2014, it was reported that the film's audio would be launched on 25 January 2014. The film's audio was launched on the said date at Hyderabad. The entire cast and crew made their way to the event which was a fun filled affair.

No.	Title	Singers	Lyricist
1	Aalapane	Sri Soumya	Vanamali
2	Chitti Papayee II Pranavi, Sri Krishna		Vanamali
3	Swaralu	Kawshik Kalyan	Vanamali
4	Neetho	Pavan	Vanamali
5	Ye Kshanam	Sri Soumya	Vanamali

== Reception ==
A critic from The Hindu wrote, "The entire film is shot in the rain to show the mood of the story and the characters. The setting is very believable and cinematography captures the locations and ambience vividly" but concluded that "Many scenes were incorporated to fill the spaces, dialogues are dramatic and the pace slow. Archana and Sivaji are okay but they didn’t quite fit into the period drama, both sounding bit awkward in their costumes and dialogues".
