= Sarojini Devi Award for a Film on National Integration =

Nandi Award commissioned since 1983

The Nandi Award for Sarojini Award Film on National Integration was commissioned in 1983. This is a list of winners of the award for this category.

== Winners ==
Year	Film	Producer
2016	--	--
2015	Kanche	Y. Rajeev Reddy, J. Sai Babu
2014	Prabhanjanam	V. Bhaskar Rao
2013	Alias Janaki	Daya Kodavaganti
2012	--	--
2011	Jai Bolo Telangana	N. Shankar
2010	Parama Veera Chakra	C. Kalyan
2009	Jagadguru Sri Shirdi Saibaba	B.V. Reddy
2008	1940 Lo Oka Gramam	Narasimha Nandi; N. C. Narasimha Reddy
2007	Chandrahas	Harinath Policharla
2006	Hanumanthu	Srihari
2005	--	--
2004	The End	Venkat
2003	--	--
2002	Khadgam	Sunkara Madhu Murali
2001	Padma	G. Haribabu
2000	Hindustan The Mother	G. Haribabu
1999	Bharata Ratna	B. Srinivasa Rao
1998	Eshwar Alla	Ayyappa P. Sharma
1993	Margadarsi	B. S. Narayana
1992	Dr. Ambedkar	P. Padmavathi
1991	Aagraham	Shyam Prasad Reddy
1990	Komaram Bheem	Aadhi Vasi Chitra Brundham
1987	Kulala Kurukshetram	Vallabhaneni Lakshmidasu
1983	Vimukthi kosam	Naradasu Laxman Rao

== See also ==
- Cinema of Andhra Pradesh
