= Nandi Award for Best Art Director =

Indian film award

This is a list of winners of the Nandi Award for Best Art Director and the films they won for.

Year	Director	Film
2016	A.S. Prakash	Janatha Garage
2015	Sabu Cyril	Baahubali: The Beginning
2014	Vijaykrishna	Hanuman Chalisa
2013	A.S. Prakash	Mirchi
2012	S. Ramakrishna	Andala Rakshasi
2011	S. Ravinder	Rajanna
2010	Ashok Koralath	Varudu
2009	Ravinder	Magadheera
2008	Ashok Koralath	Arundhati
2007	Srinivasa Raju	Chandamama
2006	Ashok Koralath	Pournami
2005	Vivek	Nuvvostanante Nenoddantana
2004	Thota Tharani	Arjun
2003	Ashok Koralath	Okkadu
2002	P. Ranga Rao	Khadgam
2001	Ashok Koralath	Daddy
2000	Gangadhar	Sri Sai Mahima
1999	Srinivasa Raju	Rajakumarudu
1998	Srinivasa Raju	Anthahpuram
1997	V. Bhaskar Raju	Annamayya
1996	B. Chalam	Sri Krishnarjuna Vijayam
1995	Chanti	Dharma Chakram
1994	Peketi Ranga	Bhairava Dweepam
1993	V. Bhaskar Raju	Major Chandrakanth
1992	B. Chalam	Aapadbandhavudu
1991	Peketi Ranga	Aditya 369
1990	B. Chalam	Jagadeka Veerudu Athiloka Sundari
1989	Thota Tharani	Geethanjali
1988	Ramana	Choopulu Kalasina Subhavela
1987	V. Bhaskar Raju	Viswanatha Nayakudu
1986	Naagarajan	Astalakshmi Vaibhavam
1985	V. Bhaskara Raju	Mayuri
1984	K. Bhaskar Raju	Suvarna Sundari
1983	Thota Tharani	Saagara Sangamam
1982	Bhaskar Raju	Ekalavya
1981	Bhaskar Raju	Premabhishekam
