= 1940 Lo Oka Gramam =

- Directed by: Narasimha Nandi
- Based on: Nayudu Pilla by Gudipati Venkatachalam
- Produced by: N. C. Narasimham
- Starring: Baladitya; Sri Ramya
- Music by: Saketh Sairam
- Release date: 2008
- Country: India
- Language: Telugu

1940 Lo Oka Gramam (transl. A village in 1940) is a 2008 Indian Telugu-language period drama film directed by Narasimha Nandi. It stars Baladitya and Sri Ramya, with Rallapalli, Mukkuraju, Rajitha and Gundu Hanumantha Rao in supporting roles. It is inspired by the story Nayudu Pilla written by Gudipati Venkata Chalam. The director mentions that Nayudu Pilla inspired him to develop the story. It is produced by N. C. Narasimham.

== Cast ==
- Baladitya as Suri
- Sri Ramya as Suseela
- Rallapalli
- Mukku Raju as Dixitulu
- Ramakrishna
- Rajitha as Suseela's mother
- Gundu Hanumantha Rao
- Sri Latha
- Sai Lakshmi

== Reception ==
Despite winning accolades, the film remained unreleased for two years and had a poor theatrical performance.

== Awards and honours ==
Year	Award category	Winner	Ref.
2008	National Film Award for Best Feature Film in Telugu	N. C. Narasimham	
2008	Sarojini Devi Award for a Film on National Integration	N. C. Narasimham	
2008	Nandi Award for Best Character Actor	Mukku Raju	
2008	Nandi Special Jury Award	Sri Ramya	
