= Kapoli (K.G.) =

- Village
- Country: India
- State: Karnataka
- District: Belgaum
- Talukas: Khanapur

Government
  - Type: Desai Raj

Languages
  - Official: Marathi
- Time zone: UTC+5:30 (IST)

Kapoli (K.G.) is a village in Belgaum district in Karnataka, India.
