= Mirchi (film) =

2013 Indian film by Koratala Siva

- Theatrical release poster
- Directed by: Koratala Siva
- Written by: Koratala Siva
- Produced by: V. Vamsi Krishna Reddy; Pramod Uppalapati
- Starring: Prabhas; Anushka Shetty; Richa Gangopadhyay
- Cinematography: Chota K. Naidu
- Edited by: Kotagiri Venkateswara Rao
- Music by: Devi Sri Prasad
- Production company: UV Creations
- Distributed by: Great India Films (Overseas)
- Release date: 8 February 2013
- Running time: 160 minutes
- Country: India
- Language: Telugu
- Box office: est.₹87 crore

Mirchi (transl. Chilli) is a 2013 Indian Telugu-language action drama film written and directed by debutant Koratala Siva, and produced by UV Creations. The film stars Prabhas, Anushka Shetty and Richa Gangopadhyay (in her penultimate Telugu film till date) in the lead roles with Sathyaraj, Sampath Raj, Adithya Menon, Subbaraju and Brahmanandam featuring in supporting roles. The music is composed by Devi Sri Prasad. The film follows Jai (Prabhas), who, after meeting Manasa (Richa Gangopadhyay) in Milan returns to India with the intention of reforming her violent family. However, he seems to have a mysterious connection with her family and a rather dark past.

The film's working title was Vaaradhi, but it was later renamed as Mirchi. It received an A (adults only) classification from the CBFC. The film opened to positive reviews and went on to be one of the highest grossing Telugu films of the year 2013 as well as one of the highest-grossing Telugu films of all time at the time of its release, with a gross over ₹87 crore and a share of ₹47.45 crore.

The film won six Nandi Awards, including Best Feature Film (Gold), Best Actor, Best First Film of a Director, Best Villain and Best Art Director for 2013. Kailash Kher won Filmfare Award for Best Male Playback Singer – Telugu, and Nandi Award for Best Male Playback Singer for the song Pandagala Digivacchavu. It was remade in Kannada as Maanikya (2014), in Bengali as Bindaas (2014) and in Odia as Biswanath (2022).

== Plot ==
In Milan, Italy, a young woman named Manasa encounters Jai while fleeing from a group of aggressive men. Instead of resorting to physical violence, Jai deftly de-escalates the situation and resolves the conflict. As the two spend time together, they develop a deep mutual affection. However, realizing the depth of her feelings, Manasa abruptly asks Jai to cut ties with her; she explains that her family's conservative restrictions and violent background would never permit their union, and she cannot bear the pain of an inevitable separation. Heartbroken but determined, Jai travels to India to address the root cause of her distress. He purposefully interacts with Manasa's short-tempered brother, Poorna, gradually reforming his aggressive behavior. Impressed by Jai's character, Poorna invites him to their ancestral village, a faction-ridden region defined by generation-spanning blood feuds. Jai's peaceful philosophy slowly softens the hostile temperament of the household, earning the affection of everyone except Manasa’s stubborn uncle, Uma. The family eventually proposes a marriage between Jai and Manasa, prompting her to confess her love. Jai, however, reveals that he is the son of Deva, their arch-rival, and narrates his family's tragic history.

Past: Deva strove to eliminate factional violence and reform his village, but his peace-loving wife, Latha, grew terrified for their son’s safety. Unable to cope with the constant danger, she left Deva and relocated to the city, raising Jai in anonymity. Years later, Jai becomes a highly successful architect running a premier construction firm. Upon discovering his roots, he visits his father's village and falls in love with his cousin, Vennela. The peace is threatened when Uma attempts to extort ancestral land from Deva. When Deva refuses, Uma publicly insults him, prompting Jai to launch a series of anonymous, calculated retaliatory attacks against Manasa’s clan. Later, when an external marriage proposal is brought for Vennela, she confesses her lifelong love for Jai to Latha. Overjoyed, both families arrange for Jai and Vennela to be wed. However, during the wedding festivities, a local police inspector warns Deva that the old enmity is being actively rekindled due to Jai's shadow warfare. Moments later, Uma’s faction launches a brutal ambush on the venue. Forced to defend his family, Jai violently decimates the attackers, killing Manasa's elder brother in the process, but Latha is killed in the crossfire. Devastated by the bloodshed, a grieving Deva blames Jai for provoking the attack and banishes him from the family.

Present: Uma challenges Jai, declaring that if Jai can successfully match his clan's brutality and defeat his fighters in combat, he will willingly adopt Jai's philosophy of non-violence. Jai accepts the challenge and effortlessly overpowers Uma's forces. Still oblivious to Jai's heritage, a desperate Uma promises Jai that if he can help them permanently eliminate Deva's son, he will gladly give Manasa's hand in marriage to him. Angry at Uma's unyielding obsession with bloodshed, Jai discloses his true identity as Deva's son.

A fierce duel erupts between Uma and Jai. Despite gaining the upper hand, Jai refuses to deliver a fatal blow, passionately explaining that blood feuds only perpetuate endless cycles of grief and that peaceful coexistence is the only logical solution. Moved by his words, his own family members persuade Uma to recognize how Jai’s compassion has fundamentally reformed their household. The final breakthrough occurs when Manasa's paralyzed father unexpectedly regains his speech through sheer emotion, pleading for Jai's life to be spared. Deva, who has just arrived at the venue and witnessed the entire event, realizes his son's non-violent methods have achieved the peace he always dreamed of. Deva tearfully begs for Jai's forgiveness and welcomes him back. With Manasa's selfless blessing, Jai finally returns home and permanently reunites with Vennela.

== Cast ==
- Prabhas as Jai, an architect
- Anushka Shetty as Vennela, Jai's fiancée and later wife
- Richa Gangopadhyay as Manasa, Jai’s colleague
- Sathyaraj as Deva, Jai's father
- Nadhiya as Latha, Jai's mother
- Brahmanandam as Veera Prathap
- Sampath Raj as Uma, the main antagonist
- Adithya Menon as Jai's uncle
- Rakesh Varre as Rahul
- Subbaraju as Poorna, Manasa's cousin brother
- Satyam Rajesh as 'Nalla' Nagulu, Jai's cousin brother
- Nagineedu as Rajayya, Uma's older brother
- Raghu Babu as Deva's aide
- Priya as Manasa's mother
- Banerjee as Manasa's father, Uma's elder brother
- Supreeth as Karimulla, Uma's main aide
- Moulika as Veera Pratap's sister-in-law
- Ajay as Manasa's elder brother and Poorna's cousin
- Hema as Manasa's family house-maid
- Y. Kasi Viswanath as Vennela's father
- Srinivasa Reddy as Jai's assistant
- Raghu Karumanchi as a college student
- Prabhas Sreenu as Poorna's aide
- Karthik
- Madhavi
- Raju Sundaram (Cameo appearance in the song "Yahoon Yahoon")
- Hamsa Nandini as dancer in the title song "Mirchi"

== Production ==
=== Casting ===
The team finalised the casting of the two lead actresses Anushka and Richa Gangopadhyay. The father and mother characters in the film were played by Sathyaraj and Nadhiya respectively.

=== Filming ===
Principal photography for the film began on 1 December 2011 at S. V. P. National Police Academy establishment in Hyderabad. Filming resumed on 16 January 2012 at a house set at Kokapet on the outskirts of Hyderabad. The set was built and previously used for S. S. Rajamouli's Maryada Ramanna. The filming continued till end of January with action Sequences for climax episodes were canned. After one month, filming resumed at Saradhi Studios in Hyderabad. Director canned few scenes involving Supreeth, Kota Srinivasa Rao and Prabhas. In March 2012, filming was done at Ramoji Film City with lead actors. Filming resumed from 17 May in RFC where action sequences were canned on a railway station set. A new schedule began from 17 June in Hyderabad where important scenes on lead actors were shot. After the schedule, filming resumed in Pollachi where scenes on Prabhas, Anushka and Richa were canned. It was reported that the unit would move to Italy to shoot few songs on the lead actors. The film completed its Europe schedule on 14 October, where couple of songs were shot. The unit members of the film shifted to Tenkasi for shooting action scenes on 24 October. The next schedule of the film was progressed at Ramoji Film City picturising a song "Suno Senorita" on Prabhas and Richa Gangopadhyay. The Small Schedule of the movie was canned at Kutralam in Tamil Nadu on Prabhas, Anushka Shetty and on few lead Cast members. Ramajogayya Sastry visited the shooting spot of Mirchi at Annapurna Studios where a song was canned on Prabhas and Anushka Shetty with Dance Master Prem Rakshith. The visual effects of the movie was done by Light Line Entertainments in which a foreign location was creatively visualised.

== Soundtrack ==
Mirchi

Soundtrack album by Devi Sri Prasad
- Released: 5 January 2013
- Recorded: 2012–2013
- Genre: Film soundtrack
- Length: 24:03
- Language: Telugu
- Label: Aditya Music
- Producer: Devi Sri Prasad

Devi Sri Prasad chronology
Alex Pandian (2012)	Mirchi (2013)	Iddarammayilatho (2013)

Devi Sri Prasad composed the Music for this film. The audio launch was held on 5 January 2013 at Ramanaidu Studios in Nanakramguda at Hyderabad. Krishnam Raju attended the audio launch function as chief guest, released the audio CD and handed over the first piece to Rajamouli. Dil Raju, Shyam Prasad Reddy released the trailers on this occasion.

All lyrics are written by Ramajogayya Sastry.

No.	Title	Artist(s)	Length
1.	"Mirchi"	Chinnaponnu	01:23
2.	"Yahoon Yahoon"	Mika Singh	04:40
3.	"Idhedho Bagundhe"	Vijay Prakash, Anitha Karthikeyan	04:26
4.	"Pandagala"	Kailash Kher	04:51
5.	"Barbie Girl"	Jaspreet Jasz, Suchitra	03:57
6.	"Nee Choopula"	Kailash Kher	00:58
7.	"Darlingey"	Geetha Madhuri, Deepu	03:44
Total length:			24:03

=== Reception ===
AP Herald gave a review stating "Devi Sri Prasad started this year giving chart-buster songs to music lovers, this album surely stands as one of the best audio in Prabhas films."

== Release ==
Mirchi received an A (adults only) classification from the CBFC which was initially willing to give the film a U/A (parental guidance) classification with 2-3 cuts, but the makers accepted the A certificate in order to avoid cuts. The movie released worldwide on 8 February 2013 amidst high expectations as it is the biggest outing of Prabhas. Great India Films is releasing Mirchi in 176 centers from 7 February in USA alone, which is by far one of the best and humongous release. The movie has beaten the record of Seethamma Vakitlo Sirimalle Chettu (SVSC) and Naayak, which had released in 69 and 54 screens, respectively, in the country. Mirchi is coming up with all digital screening in USA to ensure that it will have superb quality screens across USA.

=== Pre-release revenues ===
Mirchi overseas rights sold to a leading distribution company Great India Films, USA. Some information is that Mirchi overseas rights sold for ₹ 2 Crores to Great India Films. Mirchi satellite rights were bought for ₹6 crore (US$640,000) by Maa TV. Mirchi had a pre-release revenue up to ₹10 crore (US$1.1 million) by music and satellite rights. The film's Hindi satellite rights were sold for ₹2.75 crore (US$290,000).

=== Marketing ===
On 21 October 2012 the First Look posters and photos was released to the market in the view of the Prabhas Birthday on 23 October. Mirchi movie teaser was scheduled for launch on 18 November 2012. The first teaser of Mirchi movie was released in YouTube on 18 November 2012. The teaser got viral response across web and it has raised the expectations among the fans and movie buffs.

== Reception ==
=== Critical reception ===
Mirchi received positive reviews from critics, praising the performances (particularly Prabhas & Sampath Raj), Siva's direction, emotional weight of the story, soundtrack, background score & action set pieces. Jalapathy Gudelli gave the film 3.25 stars out of 5, concluding his review that "Mirchi showcases Prabhas in different avatar. Neat package of masala moments and Prabhas are the strengths. Mirchi is a decent entertainer and time pass flick". Jeevi gave a rating of 3.25 out of 5, commenting that "First half of Mirchi is decent. Flashback episode which occupies 100% of second half is good. Climax could have been better. The plus points of the film are Prabhas, music and all-round orientation. On a whole, Mirchi has all the ingredients of a commercial potboiler". Way2movies also gave a rating of 3.25/5, giving the verdict that "Prabhas rocks the show in this decent yet formulaic commercial entertainer". Super good movies gave the film 3 stars in a scale of 5, reviewing that "Go and Watch Mirchi, It entertains both Class and Mass. It is a worth watch".

In the contrary, The Times of India gave the film a revised rating of 3.5/5 (from 2.5/5), recommending the film, "Watch it for Prabhas, for there isn't much of anything else that this movie has to offer, besides extreme close-ups of Richa's waistline." NDTV Movies gave the film a mixed review, stating that "apart from good direction and strong performances by lead actors, Mirchi lacks narrative power and is loosely based on an amalgamation of some old films (sandakozhi ), which makes the film quite predictable."

=== Box office ===
The film had a 30 crore budget and collected 87 crores at the worldwide box office and the distributor share of 47.45 crores and declared as Blockbuster at the Box Office.

== Accolades ==
Awards	Category	Nominee	Result
2013 Nandi Awards	Best Film (Gold)	V. Vamsi Krishna Reddy	Won
2013 Nandi Awards	Best First Film of a Director	Koratala Siva	Won
2013 Nandi Awards	Best Actor	Prabhas	Won
2013 Nandi Awards	Best Villain	Sampath Raj	Won
2013 Nandi Awards	Best Art Director	A.S. Prakash	Won
2013 Nandi Awards	Best Male Playback Singer	Kailash Kher	Won
61st Filmfare Awards South	Best Film – Telugu	Mirchi	Nominated
61st Filmfare Awards South	Best Director – Telugu	Koratala Siva	Nominated
61st Filmfare Awards South	Best Actor – Telugu	Prabhas	Nominated
61st Filmfare Awards South	Best Actress – Telugu	Anushka Shetty	Nominated
61st Filmfare Awards South	Best Music Director – Telugu	Devi Sri Prasad	Nominated
61st Filmfare Awards South	Best Lyricist – Telugu	Ramajogayya Sastry (for song "Pandagala Digivachalu")	Nominated
61st Filmfare Awards South	Best Male Playback Singer – Telugu	Kailash Kher (for song "Pandagala Digivachalu"	Won
61st Filmfare Awards South	Best Female. Playback Singer – Telugu	Chinnaponnu (for song "Mirchi")	Nominated
3rd South Indian International Movie Awards	Best Film (Telugu)	Mirchi	Nominated
3rd South Indian International Movie Awards	Best Director (Telugu)	Koratala Siva	Nominated
3rd South Indian International Movie Awards	Best Cinematographer (Telugu)	Madhi	Nominated
3rd South Indian International Movie Awards	Best Actor (Telugu)	Prabhas	Nominated
3rd South Indian International Movie Awards	Best Supporting Actor (Telugu)	Sathyaraj	Nominated
3rd South Indian International Movie Awards	Best Actor in a Negative Role – Telugu	Sampath Raj	Won
3rd South Indian International Movie Awards	Best Fight Choreographer – Telugu	Anal Arasu	Nominated
3rd South Indian International Movie Awards	Best Dance Choreographer – Telugu	Prem Rakshit (for song "Darlingey")	Nominated
Santosham Film Awards	Best Lyricist	Ramajogayya Sastry	Won
Santosham Film Awards	Best Art Director	A.S. Prakash	Won

== Remakes ==
John Abraham, actor turned producer has acquired the Hindi remake rights of Mirchi from the makers. John told PTI, "I saw the film and loved it a lot. We have bought the rights of the film and are quite excited to remake it here in Hindi. I would be acting in the film too. The cast and crew members are not yet finalized." From South, Kannada actor, director and producer Sudeep directed and acted in the Kannada remake of Mirchi. The film was named as Maanikya (2014). Sudeep roped V. Ravichandran for an important role in the remake.
