= Newton Cinema =

Film production company

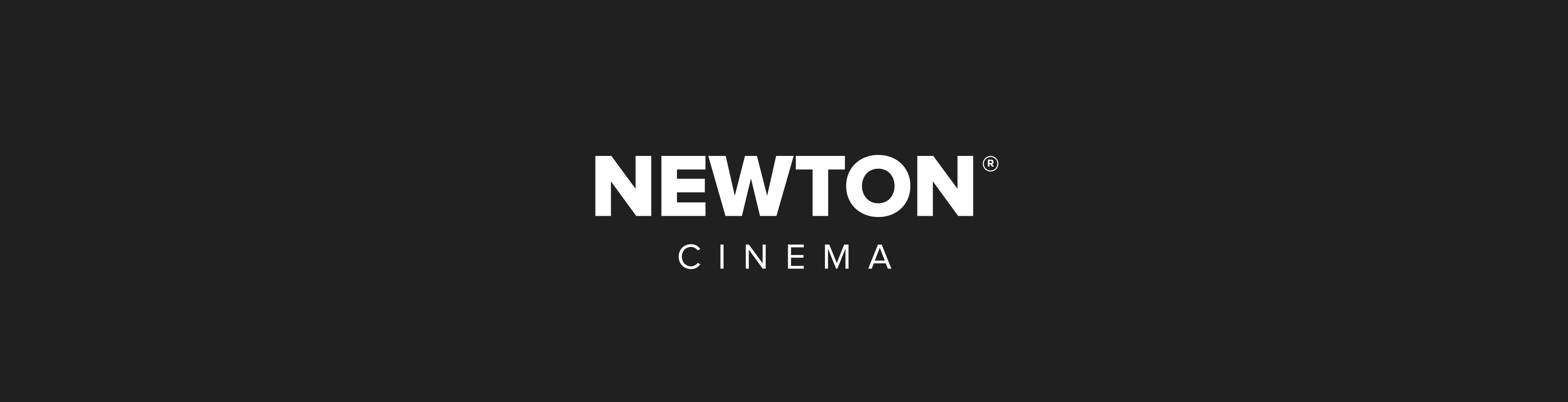
- Industry: Entertainment
- Founded: 2020
- Founder: Anto Chittilappilly; Sanita Chittilappilly
- Products: Film and Documentary Production
- Website: https://newtoncinema.com/

Newton Cinema is a film production company founded in 2020 by Anto Chittilappilly and Sanita Chittilappilly. The company offices in Boston, San Francisco, Los Angeles, Mumbai and Kochi. Newton Cinema is known for producing artistically ambitious films that have premiered at major international festivals and garnered global critical acclaim. The company focuses on storytelling that reflects diverse cultural perspectives, often collaborating with visionary filmmakers.

== Productions ==
=== Paradise (2024) ===
Paradise is a multilingual feature film directed by acclaimed Sri Lankan filmmaker Prasanna Vithanage, and presented by Mani Ratnam’s Madras Talkies The film stars Roshan Mathew, Darshana Rajendran, Shyam Fernando and Mahendra Perera. It premiered at the Busan International Film Festival, where it was awarded the Kim Jiseok Award. The film also won the Prix du Jury Lycéen at the Vesoul International Festival of Asian Cinema, and Audience Jury Award at Las Palmas de Gran Canaria International Film Festival.

Paradise received four nominations at the 17th Asian Film Awards Academy, and three nominations at the New York Indian Film Festival, including Best Film and Best Director. It was theatrically released in June 2024 and is currently available for streaming on Amazon Prime Video, Simply South, BookMyShow, MUBI and other platforms.

=== Family (2024) ===
Directed by Don Palathara, Family features Vinay Forrt, Divya Prabha, Mathew Thomas, Nilja Baby and Abhija Sivakala. The film premiered at the International Film Festival Rotterdam. Family was released in theaters in February 2024, and is currently streaming on ManoramaMax, Simply South, and other digital platforms.

=== Lalanna's Song (2022) ===
Directed by Megha Ramaswamy, Lalanna's Song premiered at the Indian Film Festival of Los Angeles, where it received an Honorable Mention from the jury. The film is available for streaming on MUBI from May 2025.

=== Kiss (2022) ===
KISS is a science fiction drama written and directed by Varun Grover. It premiered at the New York Indian Film Festival and was also screened at the International Film Festival Rotterdam. The film is currently available for streaming on MUBI from June 2025.

=== Mayilaa (2026) ===
Mayilaa is a Tamil drama film written and directed by Semmalar Annam. The film had its world premiere at the 55th International Film Festival Rotterdam in Bright Future section on 31 January 2026. It was selected at the 9th Malaysia International Film Festival in the New Rhythms of Indian Cinema section and screened in July 2026.

=== Leftover (2026) ===
Leftover is a socio-political drama directed by Salim Ahamed. It is a multilingual feature film about a family shaken by a life-altering truth written by Salim Ahamed and P.V Shajikumar. The film features Arjun Radhakrishnan, Zarin Shihab, Tanmay Dhanania, Shweta Basu Prasad and Roshan Mathew.

== Critical Acclaim ==
Both Paradise and Family were named among the Top 10 Indian Films of 2023 by the FIPRESCI India Grand Prix. At the Critics Choice Awards presented by the Film Critics Guild, both films were nominated for Best Feature Film, with Darshana Rajendran winning Best Actress for her performance in Paradise.

== Filmography ==
Year	Title	Language	Director	Cinematographer	Cast
2022	KISS	Hindi	Varun Grover	Sylvester Fonseca	Adarsh Gourav, Swanand Kirkire, Shubhrajyoti Barat
2022	Lalanna's Song	Malayalam	Megha Ramaswamy	Kuldeep Mamania	Nakshatra Indrajith, Rima Kallingal, Parvathy Thiruvothu
2024	Family	Malayalam	Don Palathara	Jaleel Badusha	Vinay Forrt, Divya Prabha, Mathew Thomas, Nilja K Baby, Abhija Sivakala, Sajitha Madathil
2024	Paradise	Malayalam, English, Sinhala, Tamil, Hindi	Prasanna Vithanage	Rajeev Ravi	Roshan Mathew, Darshana Rajendran, Shyam Fernando, Mahendra Perera
2026	Mayilaa	Tamil	Semmalar Annam	Vinoth Janakiraman	Melodi Dorcas, Shudarkodi V, Sathya Maruthani, Geetha Kailasam, Auto Chandran, Janaki Suresh
2026	Leftover	Malayalam/ Hindi/ Tamil/ Bengali/ English	Salim Ahamed	Sharan Velayudhan Nair	Arjun Radhakrishnan, Zarin Shihab, Roshan Mathew, Shweta Basu Prasad, Tanmay Dhanania
