= Sahana (TV series) =

Indian Tamil-language TV series

- Created by: K. Balachander
- Developed by: B. Kailasam
- Written by: K.Balachander
- Screenplay by: K.Balachander
- Directed by: K.Balachander; Venkat
- Creative director: Subha Venkat
- Starring: Y. G. Mahendran; Anuradha Krishnamoorthy; Sulakshana; Kavya Shekar
- Theme music composer: Rajesh Vaidhya
- Opening theme: Aanmavin Ragam (vocals by Sudha Ragunathan & Balamurali Krishna)
- Composer: Rehaan
- Country of origin: India
- Original language: Tamil
- No. of seasons: 1
- No. of episodes: 306

Production
- Producers: B. Kailasam; Geetha B. Kailasam
- Cinematography: R.Ragunatha Reddy; KS.Nagaraj
- Editors: D.Raju; AR.Pandiyan; AR.Benniraj; S.Ramamoorthy
- Camera setup: Multi-camera
- Running time: 15-23 Mins
- Production company: Minbimangal

Original release
- Network: Jaya TV
- Release: 28 February 2003 – 2004

Sahana (titled as Sahana - Sindhu Bhairavi 2) is an Indian Tamil-language TV series produced by K. Balachander. It is a sequel to the 1985 film Sindhu Bhairavi which Balachander directed. The first episode was aired on Jaya TV on 24 February 2003.

== Cast ==
- Y. G. Mahendran as JKB a.k.a. JK.Balaganapathy
- Anuradha Krishnamurthy as Sindhu
- Sulakshana as Bhairavi
- Kavya Shekar as Sahana
- Prakash Raj as Dhanapalan
- Bombay Gnanam as Madhavi
- Krishna as Surya
- Shylaja Chetlur as JKB's sister, Shankari
- Kavithalaya Krishnan as Pandian, JKB's driver
- Renuka Meera
- A. R. Srinivasan as Judge Kumaraguru
- Madhan Bob as Vishwanathan, Meera's ex-husband
- Delhi Ganesh as Gurumoorthy
- Janakaraj as Gajapathi
- Achamillai Gopi
- T. V. Varadarajan as Sivagnanam, Shankari's husband
- Oorvambu Lakshmi as Pandian's first wife
- Revathi Shankar
- Suganthi Perumal
- Sriranjani as Radha
- Sureshwar as Kumaran
- Vishnu
- Rajkamal as Sivakrishnan
- Mohan Raman as Sivasubramaniam
- Master Sriram
- Hemamalini
- Preetha Raaghav as Raasi
- Damal Shrividhya as Shakti
- Sonia Bose
- Giridharan as Sundaram
- Sharmela Thiru
- Sridharan

== Production ==
=== Development ===
Though K. Balachander had been toying with the idea of making a sequel to his 1985 film Sindhu Bhairavi for over 10 years since the early 1990s, he eventually abandoned the idea as he believed people would compare it unfavourably to the film. Near the end of the TV series Anni, produced by his company Minbimangal, he went searching for an idea for his next series and rediscovered the sequel to the film he had written years before, albeit not very diligently. The title of the series Sahana is a reference to the Carnatic raga of the same name.

=== Casting ===
Balachander initially wanted the main cast of the film to reprise their roles in the series. Sivakumar was unable to return as JKB as he was committed to another series. Suhasini was willing to return as Sindhu, but Balachander decided on recasting. Executive Subha said, "You cannot separate JKB and Sindhu. Sir (Balachander) felt if we are going to have a different JKB, let's have a different Sindhu too". The role of JKB went to Y. G. Mahendran. He considered it a challenge to portray JKB, due to his reputation as a comedian. Balachander and his unit were initially unable to locate Sulakshana, who played Bhairavi in the film and had long since retired from acting, and decided to kill off Bhairavi. However, Sulakshana learned about the project and approached Balachander, saying she would portray Bhairavi. The script was rewritten to have her character alive. Sulakshana said, "[Bhairavi] is still the same soft person. The only difference is she is older and the mother of two children. There is more understanding between JKB and Bhairavi now -- she doesn't fight with him". Carnatic singer Anuradha Krishnamurthy, who had never acted before, was approached by Minbimangal to portray Sindhu. She was reluctant to accept the offer, due to her lack of interest in acting. But after her husband persuaded, she met Balachander, who promised to ensure that her commitment to the series would not affect her concerts; Anuradha then agreed to the role. Newcomer Kavya Shekar was cast as the title character after one of her father's friends recommended her to Balachander.

== Music ==
Rajhesh Vaidhya composed the songs for the series. Carnatic singers Balamurali krishna and Sudha Ragunathan sang the title song. While Dr. Narayanan, Saindhavi, Mahathi, and others also sang songs. Pulamaipithan wrote all the songs.

== Broadcast ==
The first episode aired on Jaya TV on 24 February 2003.
