= Family (2023 film) =

2024 Indian film

- Film poster
- Directed by: Don Palathara
- Written by: Don Palathara; Sherin Chatherine
- Produced by: Newton Cinema
- Starring: Vinay Forrt; Divya Prabha; Nijla K Baby; Mathew Thomas; Abhija Sivakala
- Cinematography: Jaleel Badusha
- Edited by: Don Palathara
- Music by: Basil C J
- Production company: Newton Cinema
- Release dates: July 2023 (Halicarnassus); 22 February 2024
- Running time: 111 minutes
- Country: India
- Language: Malayalam

Family is a 2023 Indian Malayalam-language drama film directed, written, and edited by Don Palathara, with co-writing credits to Sherin Chatherine. The film premiered at the 52nd International Film Festival Rotterdam on 28 January 2023. It was also screened at the14th Bengaluru International Film Festival 2023. Produced by Anto Chittilappilly through his production company, Newton Cinema, the film features Vinay Forrt, Divya Prabha, Abhija Sivakala, Nilja K Baby and Mathew Thomas in pivotal roles. Family was theatrically released on 22 February 2024.

== Plot ==
Sony, a Catholic man in his late twenties from rural central Kerala, initially appears to be a do-gooder and a well-wisher. However, beneath his public persona lies a different character. Even as some of his family members become aware of his deeds, they are silenced by a system that mindfully and actively protects men, their delinquencies, and secrets. The family thus becomes a sturdy closet where skeletons of the past are kept unknown and unseen by the outside world. The film seeks to understand why the family system operates like the mafia when it comes to crimes from within.

== Cast ==
- Vinay Forrt as Sony
- Divya Prabha as Rani
- Nilja K Baby as Neethu
- Mathew Thomas as Nobi
- Abhija Sivakala as Jaya
- KK Indira as Nun
- Hridesh TB as Subin
- Jolly Chirayath
- Sajitha Madathil
- Aarsha Chandini Baiju as Sony's bride

== Release ==
The film premiered at the 52nd International Film Festival Rotterdam in January 2023. Family was also screened at the 14th Bengaluru International Film Festival. It was selected as one of the five contenders for the “Young Jury Prize” at the 68th Cork International Film Festival in Ireland.

Family was also chosen as one of the two Malayalam films in the International Competition section of the 28th International Film Festival of Kerala (IFFK), held in December 2023. Additionally, it was included among the Top 10 Indian films curated by the FIPRESCI India Grand Prix 2023.

The film was theatrically released on 22 February 2024 and began streaming on Manorama Max and Simply South from 6 December 2024.

== Reception ==
Since its premiere at the International Film Festival Rotterdam, Family has enjoyed sold-out screenings and immediate acclaim from audiences and media worldwide. It has been hailed as a riveting exposé, skillfully crafted with a thought-provoking and provocative filmmaking style by director Don Palathara.

== Awards and nominations ==
Year	Event	Category and award	Recipient(s)	Result	Ref.
2023	Halicarnassus Film Festival, Turkey	Best Film	Family	Won	
2023	Indian Film Festival of Melbourne	Best Indie Film 2023	Family	Nominated	
2023	Indian Film Festival of Melbourne	Best Director	Don Palathara	Nominated	
2023	Melbourne Cineverse Festival	Best Film	Family	Nominated	
2023	International Film Festival of Kerala	Best Film, International Competition	Family	Nominated	
2023	International Film Festival Innsbruck	Best Picture	Family	Nominated	
2024	Ajantha Ellora Film Festival	Best Film	Family	Nominated	
2024	Indian Film Festival Bhubaneswar	Best Film	Family	Nominated	
2024	Third Eye Asian Film Festival	Best Film	Family	Won	
2023	Soul Place Film Festival	Best Film	Family	Won	
2024	Sevilla Indie Film Festival	Best Film	Family	Won	
2024	Stockholm Independent Film Festival	Best Film	Family	Won	
2024	FIPRESCI India Grand Prix 2023	Best Film	Family	Nominated	
