= Mayilaa =

2026 Indian Tamil film

- Promotional poster
- Directed by: Semmalar Annam
- Screenplay by: Semmalar Annam
- Produced by: Anto Chittilappilly
- Starring: Melodi Dorcas; Shudarkodi V, Sathya Maruthani; Geetha Kailasam; Auto Chandran; Janaki Suresh
- Cinematography: Vinoth Janakiraman
- Edited by: Sreekar Prasad
- Music by: Meenakshi Ilayaraja
- Production companies: Newton Cinema; Neelam Productions
- Release date: 31 January 2026 (IFFR)
- Running time: 97 minutes
- Country: India
- Language: Tamil

Mayilaa (English: Peahen) is a 2026 Tamil drama film directed by Semmalar Annam in her debut feature and presented by Pa. Ranjith. The film produced by Newton Cinema is set in a village in Tamil Nadu and tells the story of Poongodi's struggle for independence and self-respect through the eyes of her daughter, Sudar.

The film had its world premiere at the 55th International Film Festival Rotterdam in Bright Future section on 31 January 2026.

== Synopsis ==
Poongodi, called Mayilaa, leaves her violent husband and starts a new life with her little daughter in a small village in South India. She has very little schooling and almost no choices, so she sells straw mats as a travelling seller on a rickety moped to earn money and to keep a promise she made before an important temple festival. With almost no safety or support, Mayilaa looks to the village goddess Mayilaatha, whom many women trust for courage and fairness. As pressure grows, she begins to fall into trance-like states that people believe are moments of divine possession-times when her sadness, faith, and inner strength rise freely. What begins as a fight to simply survive slowly becomes a moment of truth, as Mayilaa finally shapes her life according to her own decisions.

== Cast ==
- Melodi Dorcas as Mayilaa
- Shudarkodi V as Poongodi's daughter
- Sathya Maruthani
- Geetha Kailasam
- Auto Chandran
- Janaki Suresh

== Production ==
The director of the film Semmalar Annam in an interview disclosed that the idea of the film came to her during her travel to villages for her acting projects. She said, "I would speak to women there, and listen to their life stories. I included all that in my film."

== Release ==
Mayilaa had its world premiere at the 55th International Film Festival Rotterdam on 31 January 2026, in Bright Future section.

It competed in the International feature film competition of the Internationales Frauen* Film Fest Dortmund+Köln on 23 April 2026.

It was selected at the 9th Malaysia International Film Festival in New Rhythms of Indian Cinema section and screened in July 2026.

It was opening film of Horizon section of the 37th Singapore International Film Festival and will be screened on 22 October 2026.

== Accolades ==
Award	Date of ceremony	Category	Recipient(s)	Result	Ref.
Tasveer Film Festival	18 October 2026	Best Feature Narrative	Mayilaa	Won	
