= Andhera (TV series) =

2025 Indian supernatural horror web series

- Genre: Supernatural horror Thriller
- Created by: Gaurav Desai
- Written by: Gaurav Desai; Raaghav Dar; Karan Anshuman; Chintan Sarda
- Directed by: Raaghav Dar
- Starring: Priya Bapat; Karanvir Malhotra; Prajakta Koli; Surveen Chawla; Vatsal Seth
- Country of origin: India
- Original language: Hindi
- No. of seasons: 1
- No. of episodes: 8

Production
- Executive producers: Ritesh Sidhwani; Farhan Akhtar; Kassim Jagmania; Mohit Shah; Karan Anshuman
- Cinematography: Huentsang Mohapatra
- Editor: Manan Mehta
- Running time: 45–61 minutes
- Production company: Excel Entertainment

Original release
- Network: Amazon Prime Video
- Release: 14 August 2025 – present

Andhera (transl. Darkness) is a 2025 Indian Hindi-language supernatural horror thriller television series created by Gaurav Desai and directed by Raaghav Dar. Produced by Excel Entertainment, it stars Priya Bapat, Karanvir Malhotra, Prajakta Koli and Surveen Chawla, with Vatsal Sheth, Parvin Dabas and Pranay Pachauri in supporting roles. The eight-episode first season premiered on Amazon Prime Video on 14 August 2025.

== Premise ==
Set in Mumbai, the series follows Inspector Kalpana Kadam and Jay, a medical student, who become entangled in a missing-person case that unearths a sinister presence beneath the city.

== Cast ==
- Priya Bapat as Inspector Kalpana Kadam
- Karanvir Malhotra as Jay Sheth
- Prajakta Koli as Rumi
- Surveen Chawla as Ayesha
- Vatsal Sheth as Darius
- Sonali Sachdev as Sarita Sheth
- Rajesh Khera as Chaitanya Ji
- Parvin Dabas as Dr. Sahay
- Pranay Pachauri as Prithvi Sheth
- Dilip Shankar as Madhu Uberoi
- Gaurav Sharma as Dr. Aziz
- Kavin dave as Jude Rosario
- Anand ingle as Kanitkar
- Mohit Prajapati as Omar
- Ayam mehta as Barot
- Salim Shah

== Episodes ==
Season	Episodes	Originally released
1	8	August 14, 2025

=== Season 1 (2025) ===
Season	Episode	Title	Original release date
1	1	"Andhera Kha Gaya"	August 14, 2025
A young woman vanishes into a living, breathing darkness. Inspector Kalpana investigates the case, only to encounter resistance from within her own department. Meanwhile, Jay, a medical student haunted by nightmares of this supernatural darkness, seeks answers. Has darkness truly come alive?
1	2	"It watches us"	August 14, 2025
Kalpana's quest to solve Bani's disappearance reawakens her own traumatic memories. As Jay delves deeper into the mystery of the supernatural darkness, he finds himself caught between reality and hallucination. Meanwhile, Omar's abduction from the child shelter unveils a sinister and clandestine agenda at work.
1	3	"Patient x"	August 14, 2025
Jude searches for a comic book he believes holds the key to unraveling the supernatural darkness. Kalpana's investigation intersects with Jay and Rumi's quest, leading to startling new revelations. Meanwhile, the darkness sets its sights on a new victim.
1	4	"Aatma"	August 14, 2025
Jay’s meeting with Jude and Kalpana’s showdown with Darius unravel a deeper conspiracy. Madhu Uberai, CEO of Uberlife Pharma, reveals a twisted and ruthless plot to exploit human suffering for profit. In the midst of it all, Omar becomes the latest subject of the sinister experiment.
1	5	"Maut ko maat"	August 14, 2025
Kalpana’s fight against Darius leads her to a dead end. Desperate to save Prithvi’s life, Jay makes an unthinkable choice. As the stakes rise, the heroes find themselves in a losing battle.
1	6	"Kya tumhara naam Tama hai?"	August 14, 2025
The quest to unravel the supernatural darkness and the elusive machine unites Kalpana, Jay, Rumi, and Jude. As their search intensifies, they uncover a chilling revelation—the darkness has a name.
1	7	"Follow the data"	August 14, 2025
Aziz sets aside his skepticism and reveals long-buried secrets, hoping they hold the key to defeating the darkness. As Kalpana’s worst nightmare comes true, Jay and Rumi race to uncover the truth, while Jude spirals deeper into despair. With the darkness spreading, the battle against evil hangs in balance.
1	8	"Eternal Night"	August 14, 2025
In the epic final showdown, Jay and Rumi race against time to crack the code that could defeat the darkness. A fierce battle rages on two fronts—reality and the mind. As Tama grows unstoppable, the heroes are pushed to their limits in an ultimate clash that teeters on the brink of disaster.

== Production ==
The series was created by Gaurav Desai and directed by Raaghav Dar for Excel Entertainment. Producers include Farhan Akhtar and Ritesh Sidhwani, as reported in multiple outlets. The series is written by Gaurav Desai, Raaghav Dar, Karan Anshuman and Chintan Sarda.

== Release ==
Season 1 with eight episodes was released on Amazon Prime Video on 14 August 2025.

== Reception ==
Early reviews were mixed. Hindustan Times described the series as "high on ambition, low on chills". The Times of India praised the atmosphere over jump scares. The Indian Express called it a "juvenile mish-mash" in a critical review, while also running a feature interview with Prajakta Koli. Scroll.in described it as "fitfully frightening... its parts more intriguing than its sum".
