= Lalanna's Song =

2022 film by Megha Ramaswamy

Lalanna's Song is a Malayalam – Hindi psychological horror film directed by Megha Ramaswamy, produced by Newton Cinema and co-produced by Guneet Monga and Ramaswamy.

The film stars Nakshatra Indrajith in the title role and features Parvathy Thiruvothu and Rima Kallingal in pivotal roles.

Lalanna’s Song premiered at the Indian Film Festival of Los Angeles (IFFLA 2022), where it received an Honorable Mention. Subsequently, the film was screened at the 14th International Documentary and Short Film Festival of Kerala (14th IDSFFK), Dharamshala International Film Festival (DIFF 2022), Mumbai Film Festival (MAMI), the 15th Habitat Film Festival and the Critics Choice Awards 2023.

The film features music composed by Sneha Khanwalkar. Cinematography and editing were handled by Kuldeep Mamania and Shini JK respectively.

== Plot ==
Lalanna's Song is a cautionary tale examining the subtle manifestations of hate in our age of abundance. Two young mothers, Miriam and Shoby, encounter twelve-year old Lalanna, whose behavior unintentionally unsettles them, leading them to take deceptively small actions to correct her.

== Cast ==
- Rima Kallingal as Miriam
- Parvathy Thiruvothu as Shoby
- Nakshatra Indrajith as Lalanna
- Hannah Chacko as Meenu kutty
- Faraz Khan as Father

== Release ==
Following its premieres at various international film festivals, Lalanna's Song is now available for streaming on MUBI.

== Awards and nominations ==
Year	Event	Category	Recipient	Result
2022	IFFLA	Honorable Mention	Lalannas Song	Won
2023	The Critics Choice Awards	Best Actress Best Short Film Best Cinematographer	Nakshatra Indrajit Lalannas Song Kuldeep Mammania	Nominated
2023	Court Metrange	Competition	Lalannas Song	Nominated

== Festival appearances ==
Year	Festival	Category
2022	IFFLA	Honorable Mention
2022	IDSFFK	
2022	DIFF	
2022	Habitat Film Festival	
2022	MAMI	In Focus Shorts
2023	Final Girls Berline Film Festival	Shorts
2023	Court Metrange	Competition
2023	Indie Meme	
