= Yaathisai =

2023 Indian film by Dharani Rasendran

- Theatrical release poster
- Directed by: Dharani Rasendran
- Written by: Dharani Rasendran
- Produced by: K. J. Ganesh
- Starring: Shakthi Mithran; Seyon; Rajalakshmi
- Cinematography: Akilesh Kathamuthu
- Edited by: Mahendran Ganesan
- Music by: Chakravarthy
- Production companies: Venus Infotainment; Six Star Entertainment
- Distributed by: Sakthi Film Factory (Tamil Nadu); Ayngaran International (Overseas)
- Release date: 21 April 2023
- Running time: 121 minutes
- Country: India
- Language: Tamil
- Box office: ₹20 Crores

Yaathisai (transl. South direction) is a 2023 Indian Tamil-language historical fiction action adventure film written and directed by Dharani Rasendran in his directorial debut. The film stars Shakthi Mithran, Seyon Rajalakshmi, Samar and Vaidhegi Amarnat in the lead roles with Guru Somasundaram, Chandrakumar, Semmalar Annam, Subathra and Vijay Seyon portraying supporting roles. The film's dialogues are in Old Tamil, which are subtitled for viewers in modern Tamil.

The film was released on 21 April 2023 to positive reviews for its story, action sequences, and performances but criticism for the film's budget and resulting technical discrepancies in some sequences. Some local Tamil scholars criticized the film for its discrepancy with historical evidence and the characterization of certain characters.

== Plot ==
The movie begins with a disclaimer stating that it is a work of fiction, on the famed Pandiyan king Ranadheera Pandiyan and a fictitious clan chief named Kothi from the Einar clan. then the scene opens with an old bald man who is hurriedly walking in the woods with a ten-year-old boy. The old man narrates the story as the kid is interested to know about Ranadheera Pandiyan, the then Pandyan King and his famed foe Kothi. The movie unfolds from the narration of the old man. Ranadheera Pandiyan, is a renowned Pandyan king who ruled the present Tamil Nadu region South India circa CE 670–710, He has successfully defeated many clans and kingdoms, such as the Cheras, Cholas, Pallavas, Kongars, and others, establishing himself as a supreme leader with a vast army and a vast kingdom. Because of his unbridled authority, many tribes and clans resent his rule.

Uri, the dethroned and the defeated king of the Chola Kingdom along with his beaten Chola army and their alliances such as Paluvettaraiyars, has been hiding in a remote mountain forest waiting for an opportunity to strike the Pandyas. The Einar clan, Just like cholas, were driven to barren wilderness by the Pandyan king Ranadheera Pandiyan, Kothi, a young man from the Einar clan secretly meets with Uri, the exile king of the Chola Kingdom in the woods. There, Kothi makes a vow to Uri (the Chola leader), that he will defeat the Pandiyan king, Ranadheera Pandiyan, who is currently staying in a Chola fort, away from his Pandya kingdom's capital. Uri acknowledges Kothi's vow and agrees that if Kothi is successful in capturing the Chola fort and killing Ranadheera Pandiyan, he will bring his hidden Chola reinforcements to support Kothi in facing the large Pandiyan army and their allies that might come for revenge for their king's death. Kothi trusts the Chola leader's vow and returns to his village, determined to fulfill his mission.

After a long journey, Kothi reaches his village and wrestles a duel with the alpha male of his village. Though eventually beaten in the wrestling, He impress his tribesmen with his Chivalry. He convinces them to fight against Ranadheera Pandiyan and asks them to wait for a right opportunity to attack the Ranadheera Pandiyan, who has earned the war name, Kaalan ("The God of Death"). Kothi gathers lot of information about the Pandiyan King Ranadheeran. Kothi's spies soon tell him that the Pandiyan king along with a small troupe of private guards of Greeks and local warriors will visit a hill top shrine in few days. Kothi decides that it is the perfect moment to assassinate the Pandiyan King Ranadheera Pandiyan. so Kothi and his tribesman meet a clan's priest and perform ancient Tamil war rituals, from dusk till dawn, offering animals and human sacrifice to the war Goddess Kotravai.

On the fixed day, Kothi launches an ambush attack on Ranadheera Pandiyan and his small private guards as they were en route to visit a hilltop shrine along a mountain path. However, the Greek and local guards of Ranadheera Pandiyan swiftly formed a formidable Phalanx formation, a renowned Greek battle formation, to protect their king. Despite the sudden assault, Kothi's men were unable to break through the sturdy Phalanx formation, and suffered heavy losses in the process.

The Greek and local guards fought valiantly against the overwhelming numbers of Kothi's Einar clan warriors. However, as the battle prolonged, the Greeks realized that it would be challenging to maintain the Phalanx formation for an extended period of time against Kothi and his determined forces. In a selfless act of sacrifice, some of the brave Greeks laid down their lives, allowing Ranadheera Pandiyan and his close commanders to escape behind them to a nearby hill, connected by a narrow walking bridge.

Ranadheera Pandiyan, mindful of the pursuing Einar clan warriors, destroyed the walking bridge to prevent his capture. The scene was filled with intense action as Ranadheera Pandiyan and his loyal commanders made a daring escape, leaving behind a battlefield strewn with fallen warriors from both sides. The bravery and strategic skills displayed by Ranadheera Pandiyan's personal Greek and Local guards in protecting their king against overwhelming odds left a lasting impression on all who witnessed the fierce battle.

As the Pandiyan king is driven to deep woods though unable to be assassinated, Kothi and his tribe's men march to the Chola fort and easily take the defence, massacring the surrendered Pandyan soldiers who were few reserves stationed in the fort.

In the fallen Chola fort, Kothi, who was until then a nameless refugee, an unknown forest dweller, and a tribal nomad, adorns himself as a king with Pandiyan's golden crown and sits on the throne as king of the fort city. He sends his messengers now to the hidden Chola king Uri to come with his reinforcements, but his messengers are ambushed and killed on the way by the Ranadheera Pandiyan's guards in the woods.

In that fort city, Kothi falls for a beautiful temple dancer (Devaradiyar) who was brought from another place to this fort by a royal court advisor (presumably of the Cholas) who brings many Devaradiyars with him. After the defence fell to Kothi, Kothi fires the minister, takes the temple dancer as his concubine, and impregnates her. Repulsive to Kothi at first, she eventually accepts Kothi as her Lord Kannan, whom she yearned for so long.

Meanwhile, Ranadheera Pandiyan could not summon his main army from his capital as it far and beyond his reach, and he is stuck in the treacherous mountains with only few of his trusted commanders. Still he takes an oath that he will slay Kothi in revenge and acknowledges him as a great warrior as he did what great emperors couldn't even attempt. So he seeks the help of another hill tribe called "Perumpalli," led by a matriarch leader. She, in return, requests the Pandiayn to marry a young maiden from her tribe, as her tribe would carry the seed to the Pandiyan throne, which is considered as a great fame to the tribe . Ranadheera Pandiyan agrees and marries a young maiden from the "Perumpalli" tribe and impregnates her on their nuptial night, telling her that this consummation is merely for politics of men and not out of love for her.

As the marriage is consummated, the Perumpalli clan's matriarch leader gathers her tribe members, forms a large army, marches with the Pandiyan king to the Chola fort and lays siege to the fortress. Some battalion of Kothi's men tried to disrupt the Peruvirarkilli's armies but were utterly defeated and slaughtered. The Ranadheera Pandiyan's men also constantly ambush the messengers of Kothi to Uri, the Chola leader; hence, Uri has no knowledge of Kothi's initial success or the present scenario of Pandyan's allies are now at the gates of the Chola fort and Kothi's desperate need of his aid. The sight of the multitude of Peruvirarkilli's army camped outside at the walls of the hill fort of Cholas makes some of Kothi's men mutiny against him.

Kothi's trusted and experienced commanders tell him that it is impossible and pointless to face the colossal army of Perumpolli's clan led by the furious Ranadheera Pandiyan and that they wouldn't stand a chance when they attack the fort. Kothi realizes that Ranadheera Pandiyan has trapped him. Hence having no other option, Kothi finally decides to face the Pandiyan King Ranadheera Pandiyan in a duel. The purpose of the contest of the two men meant that one who died or surrendered would have his kingdom handed over to the winner without a war, and the fallen man, if dead, had the right to have a funeral with full honours. Ranadheera Pandiyan accepts the duel challenge.

After a night of dark and sinister rituals from Ranadheeran camp, Ranadheera Pandiyan and Kothi, meet the next day for the duel. They agreed to the conditions laid out by the shaman and invoked the gods to witness their duel. The fight was brutal, with Kothi initially putting up a tough fight against the mighty Pandiyan king. However, as the battle wore on, Kothi began to tire and realized that he was no match for the prowess of Ranadheera Pandiyan.

Kothi fought with all his strength, knowing that he is outmatched, still manages to make the Pandiyan king bleed. in return Ranatheera Pandiyan wounds Kothi fatally, and Kothi fell to the ground, bleeding profusely. Ranadheera Pandiyan, towering over the fallen warrior, yelled at Kothi to kneel and submit, but Kothi, determined and defiant, refused to yield. In a final act of defiance, Kothi refused to kneel, and hallucinates his brief fortitude. Ranadheera Pandiyan struck the final blow, slaying Kothi. Kothi's lifeless body lay on the ground, surrounded by a pool of blood, invokes the respect from his friends as well his foes. Ranadheera Pandiyan, in a display of respect for his fallen opponent's bravery, honored his funeral rites. Now, since his victory secured, Ranadheera Pandiyan triumphantly entered the Chola fort city, where he was crowned once again and seated upon the throne.

In an act of mercy, Kothi's tribesmen were spared but exiled from the kingdom. However, upon hearing the news of Kothi's death, the temple dancer, unable to bear the loss, commits suicide by drowning herself in the temple pond. Kothi's wife, who was pregnant at the time of his demise, gave birth to a male child, carrying on the legacy of his brave father.

The fame of Kothi's brave stand against the mighty Ranadheera Pandiyan and his heroic end spread across the land. The Cholas, who had been in hiding, learned of Kothi's fortitude, begins preparing their army anew. Meanwhile, the Chera warriors, who had been exiled to Arabia as slaves, returned to Tamil Nadu on Arab ships, ready to reclaim their lost glory.

The movie scene now goes back to the opening scene of Kothi's trusted commander, an old bald man, narrating this tale of his King Kothi's bravery to a 10-year-old boy, who was none other than Kothi's now-grown son. The movie ended with the poignant quote, "A brave man stood against authority," encapsulating the legacy of Kothi's unwavering fortitude and defiance against all odds.

== Cast ==
- Shakthi Mithran as Ranadheera Pandiyan, Prince and Supreme general of the Pandiyar army.
- Seyon as Kothi, a hot-blooded warrior from the Einar clan
- Rajalakshmi as a Devaradiyar
- Vaidehi Amarnath as a Devaradiyar
- Sabthaseelan as Thotṭi
- Guru Somasundaram as Priest
- Chandrakumar
- Semmalar Annam as an Einar clan member
- Subatra Robert as Peruvirarkilli Velir chieftess
- Samar as Thudi
- Vijay Seyon

== Production ==
The film is directed by Dharani Rasendran, who earlier directed Gnanaserukku.

== Music ==
The music of the film was composed by Chakravarthy.

== Release ==
=== Theatrical ===
The film was released on 21 April 2023. The film's theatrical rights were acquired by Sakthi Film Factory, and overseas rights were acquired by Ayngaran International.

=== Digital media ===
The film started digital streaming in Amazon Prime Video from 12 May 2023.

== Reception ==
Bhuvanesh Chandar of The Hindu wrote a review stating, "A few narrative stumbles aside, ‘Yaathisai’ is a truly commendable feat that one can look back on for its many positives." Logesh Balachandran of The Times of India gave the film a rating of 3/5 and wrote, "Yaathisai is appreciable in many ways, and it's a must see for fans of period dramas and people who appreciate well-crafted film."

A critic from Nakkheeran wrote a review, stating, "The film broke the stereotype that historical period action adventures need to be high-budget and top actors need to be part of the film." Navein Darshan of The New Indian Express wrote a review stating, "Unlike the traditional war films where the focus largely lingers on the leads, Yaathisai gives prominence to the extras too." A critic from Dinamalar gave the film a rating of 3/5, stating, "Some scenes have flaws, but expecting the sequel doesn't have those issues."
