= What Are the Odds =

- Film poster
- Directed by: Megha Ramaswamy
- Written by: Megha Ramaswamy; Shreya Vaidya
- Produced by: Abhay Deol; Apoorva Bakshi; Pooja Kohli; Sanjay Bachani
- Starring: Abhay Deol; Yashaswini Dayama; Karanvir Malhotra; Priyanka Bose; Monica Dogra; Manu Rishi; Sulabha Arya
- Cinematography: Johan Heurlin Aidt
- Edited by: Arindam Ghatak
- Music by: Sagar Desai
- Production company: FilmKaravan
- Distributed by: Netflix
- Release dates: 14 April 2019 (Indian Film Festival of Los Angeles); 20 May 2020
- Running time: 92 minutes
- Country: India
- Languages: Hindi; English

What Are the Odds is a 2019 Indian Hinglish drama film directed by Megha Ramaswamy. Starring Abhay Deol, Yashaswini Dayama and Karanvir Malhotra, the film tells the story of two unintentional teenage friends who end up spending an entire day together.

The film premiered at the closing night gala for the Indian Film Festival of Los Angeles in 2019, and was released on Netflix on 20 May 2020.

== Cast ==
- Abhay Deol as Valmik Burman
- Yashaswini Dayama as Vivek
- Karanvir Malhotra as Ashwin
- Priyanka Bose as Paloma
- Monica Dogra as Monica Dogra
- Manu Rishi as Rimpu
- Sulabha Arya

== Release and reception ==
Initially titled The Odds, the film met with favourable reviews following its world premiere at IFFLA 2019's closing gala - being called "a kind of story about growing up in India today unlike anything seen before." The film went on to show in the Global Village selection for Shanghai International Film Festival and the Taipei Film Festival. Film reviewer Hong Wen compared the symmetrical image structure coupled with the sweet and quirky style to be a cross reminiscent of "Wes Anderson walks into Emily's Whimsical World", lauding the independent, rebellious spirit of the film. In an interview with the Hindu, Ramaswamy revealed the film's playful tone was inspired by filmmakers like John Hughes and Sai Paranjpye, expressing that she wanted to showcase a more grounded representation of Indian millennials through the film.

The film launched to mostly positive reviews on Netflix, trending #2 on the top movies in India on Netflix at the time of release and being featured in GQ's "top-content-to-watch" list. Saibal Chatterjee of NDTV wrote: "What Are the Odds? doesn't tick boxes. It reinvents them. In the process, it trades superficial dazzle for a deep, lasting enchantment." Ashameera Aiyappan of The New Indian Express called it a "charming new age fairy tale", lauding the film's use of an outlandish screenplay, staging and narration to present a package that is colourful, vibrant and innocent. The film has been praised for its performances, cinematography, music and eccentric visual style.

However, a few have criticized the film for preferring flash over substance. Pankhuri Shukla of The Quint felt that the film "has the ambitious drive of a cute slice-of-life YA film that is also visually fascinating, but barely dips its toes in the genre." Rahul Desai of Film Companion called the film a "pretty but pointless flight of fancy" comparing it to an over-playful bundle of puppy energy – chasing its own tail, and eventually accomplishing nothing while wanting to be a bit of everything. On this note, Devansh Sharma of Firstpost pondered if the "lack of coherency" was an intentional aspect of the film's eccentric narrative vocabulary, eventually dismissing the notion because its "narrative tilts towards logic whenever it is convenient, and distances itself from insanity whenever it pleases."
