= Mohammed Maqbool Mansoor =

Indian playback singer and lyricist

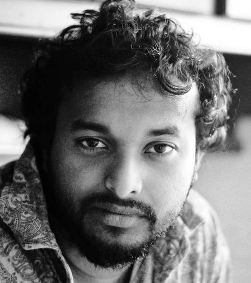
- Mohammed Maqbool Mansoor in 2016

Background information
- Born: September 14, 1987 (age 38)
- Occupations: Playback singer, lyricist, composer
- Years active: 2012–present

Mohammed Maqbool Mansoor is an Indian playback singer and lyricist who works in the Malayalam films. He is known for his works in Ennu Ninte Moideen, Charlie and Trance. In 2025, he made his debut as a music director for the Tamil film Angammal.He made his acting debut in Balan - The Boy (2026)

== Early life ==
Maqbool Mansoor was born in Vallakkadavu, Thiruvananthapuram. Pursued Film Making and Sound Engineering Degree from SAE Chennai.

== Career ==
Started his career as a background singer in Malarvadi Arts Club which was a super hit in 2010. His debut song was for Salalah Mobiles in 2014. Has also sung for Salala Mobiles 2nd official Teaser. In 2015, he wrote and sang the song Ennile Ellinaal (Mukkathe Penne) with Gopi Sundar for the film Ennu Ninte Moideen which was a big hit. He was also nominated for Best Lyricist in Malayalam at 1st IIFA Utsavam for the same work. He is the co founder of Cavemen Pictures and Alternative Pop Culture malayalam band 'Malabar Sound'.

== Notable works ==
Debut as Music Director: Mohammed Maqbool Mansoor made his debut as a music director for the movie Angammal.

Year	Film	Singer	Lyrics	Song	Composer	Notes
2012	Nee Varum (Independent Album)	Yes	Yes	Nee Varum Nerathil	Mohammed Maqbool Mansoor	Concept and Direction
2012	Ee Adutha Kaalathu	Yes	No	Oru Vazhiyay	Gopi Sundar	song min 2:26
2014	Mannar Mathai Speaking 2	Yes	No	Urvasi	Rahul Raj	
2014	Salala Mobiles	Yes	Yes	Rasoolallah	Gopi Sundar	Film Debut
2014	Bangalore Days	Yes	No	Aethu Kari Raavilum	Gopi Sundar	Humming in beginning portion of the song
2015	Ennu Ninte Moideen	Yes	Yes	Mukkathe Penne	Gopi Sundar	Ennile Ellinaal (Mukkathe Penne)
2015	Charlie	Yes	Yes	Pularikalo, Charlie to the rescue.	Gopi Sundar	DQ Intro and Interval Djinn Theme.
2015	Jamna Pyari	Yes	No	Jamna Pyari title song	Gopi Sundar	
2015	Lord Livingstone 7000 Kandi	Yes	Yes	Aayiram Kaalamai	Rex Vijayan	Lyrics of the portion where he sung only.
2017	Take Off	Yes	No	Mohabathin	Gopi Sundar	
2017	CIA - Comrade In America	Yes	Yes	Vaanam Thilathialakkanu	Gopi Sundar	
2017	Tiyaan	Yes	Yes	Tiyaan Intro (Prithvi)	Gopi Sundar	
2018	Rosapoo	Yes	No	Padinjattodiyal Kadalu	Sushin Shyam	
2018	Nithyaharitha Nayakan	Yes	No	Kanakamulla	Ranjin Raj	
2018	Kunjiramante Kuppayam	Yes	No	Ezhumalayum	Siraj	Lyrics by PK Gopi sir.
2018	Ente Ummante Peru	Yes	No	Sanjaramaay	Gopi Sundar	
2019	Happy Sardar	Yes	No	Njanakum Poovin	Gopi Sundar	Backing Vocals min 2:30
2020	Trance	Yes	No	Noolupoya	Jackson Vijayan	
2021	Chase (Kannada)	Yes	No	Manada Hosila	Karthik Aacharya	
2021	OM	No	No		Abhiram	Concept and Direction By Maqbool (Directorial Debut)
2022	OM The Infinite	No	No		Santhosh Chandran	Concept and Direction
2022	Hridayam	Yes	No	Minnalkodi	Hesham Abdul Wahab	
2022	Mike	Yes	No	Aakashame	Hesham Abdul Wahab	
2023	Khajuraho Dreams	Yes	No	Naamorupole	Gopi Sundar	
2023	Sesham Mike-il Fathima	Yes	No	Hamdala	Hesham Abdul Wahab	
2024	Qalb	Yes	No	Innalillahi	Vimal Nazar	
2024	Oru Jaathi Jaathakam	Yes	No	I Got My Dinosaur	Guna Balasubramaniam	
2024	Perumani	Yes	No	Ya Wali Allah	Gopi Sundar	
2024	Perumani	Yes	No	Salam	Gopi Sundar	
2025	Abhilasham	Yes	No	Khalbinnakame	Sreehari K Nair	
2025	Angammal	Yes	No	Uchani Poo	Mohammed Maqbool Mansoor	
2025	Angammal	No	No	Chendipoova	Mohammed Maqbool Mansoor	Sung by K.S. Chitra
2026	Mathi (Independent Single)	Yes	Yes	Mathi	Mohammed Maqbool Mansoor	
2026	Fakir (Independent Single)	Yes	Yes	Fakir	Mohammed Maqbool Mansoor	
2026	Khalifa	Yes	No	Asalayavale	Jakes Bejoy	
