= Sarcas Circa 2020 =

2021 Indian Malayalam film

- Film poster
- Directed by: Vinu Kolichal
- Written by: V Sudheesh Kumar; Vinu Kolichal
- Produced by: Joseph Abraham; Raveendran Chettathode
- Starring: Jijo K Mathew; Abhija Sivakala; Firos Khan
- Cinematography: Ram Raghav
- Edited by: Azif Ismail
- Music by: Seljuk Rustum
- Production company: Kad Cafe
- Distributed by: Kad Cafe
- Release date: 1 April 2021
- Country: India
- Language: Malayalam

Sarcas Circa 2020 is a 2021 Indian Malayalam-language film directed and co-written by Vinu Kolichal after his directorial debut Bilathikuzhal. Produced by Joseph Abraham and Raveendran Chettathode under the banner of Kad Cafe. The film features Jijo K Mathew, Abhija Sivakala, Firos Khan in lead roles. The film is predominantly set in Kasaragod. The film was released on 1 April 2021.

== Cast ==
- Jijo K Mathew
- Abhija Sivakala
- Firos Khan
- Shynoo Alexander
- Hussain Samad
- Suresh Mohn
- Ashique Khalid
- Vinu Kolichal
- Naran
- Kenshin

== Music ==
The music is composed by Seljuk Rustum and lyrics are written by Hareesh Pallaram and Siva Odayamchal.

Track listing
No.	Title	Lyrics	Singer(s)	Length
1.	"Kattuneerin chaalilayi"	Siva Odayamchal	Sekhar Sudhir and Darshana Rajendran	04:37
2.	"Kuttanu Pottante Shapam"	Harish Pallaram	Joffy Chirayath	06:04
