= Maadathy =

2019 Indian film by Leena Manimekalai

- Promotional release poster
- Directed by: Leena Manimekalai
- Screenplay by: Leena Manimekalai; Rafiq Ismail; Yavanika Sriram
- Produced by: Leena Manimekalai, Bhavana Goparaju, Abinandhan Ramanujam, Abhayanand Singh, Elango Raghupathy
- Starring: Ajmina Kassim; Patrick Raj; Semmalar Annam; Arul Kumar
- Cinematography: Jeff Dolen; Karthik Muthukumar; Abinandhan Ramanujam
- Edited by: Thangaraj Palanivel
- Music by: Karthik Raja
- Release dates: October 2019 (Busan International Film Festival); 24 June 2021 (India)
- Running time: 90 minutes
- Country: India
- Language: Tamil

Maadathy: An Unfairy Tale is a 2019 Indian Tamil-language folklore drama film directed by Leena Manimekalai. The film stars Ajmina Kassim, Patrick Raj, Semmalar Annam and Arul Kumar in the lead roles.

The film premiered at the 2019 Busan International Film Festival, where it received positive critical response. The film later got released in the OTT platform Neestream globally on 24, June 2021.

== Plot ==
The film is set against the backdrop of a river which symbolizes both the oppressor and the oppressed. The river is a way out, for the protagonist, a Dalit, Yosana; a liberation from the blind realities of caste. India is a land of Subaltern deities. Each deity has a unique legend, and these legends are often interwoven with sociohistoric tropes of India. The Puthirai Vannaar, an ‘unseeable’ Dalit caste group in southern India, are traditionally assigned the task of washing the clothes of other Dalits, the dead, and menstruating women. This film is a tale about a young girl who grew up in Puthirai vannaar caste group and how she came to be immortalized as their local deity, Maadathy.

== Cast ==
- Ajmina Kassim as Yosana
- Patrick Raj as Panneer
- Semmalar Annam as Veni
- Arul Kumar as Sudalai

== Critical reception ==
A critic from The News Minute reviewed "It's rare to see a film where the male body is subjected to the female gaze". The Cinema Express wrote, "Remarkably exudes the power of cinema, of storytelling that is poignantly reflective of a society where legends of sin circle and haunt our deities".

== Awards ==
1. World Premiere, Busan International Film Festival, October 2019.
2. India Premiere, International Competition, Kolkata International Film Festival, November 2019.
