= Sindhu Bhairavi (film) =

- Theatrical release poster
- Directed by: K. Balachander
- Written by: K. Balachander
- Produced by: Rajam Balachander; Pushpa Kandaswamy
- Starring: Sivakumar; Suhasini; Sulakshana
- Cinematography: R. Raghunatha Reddy
- Edited by: Ganesh–Kumar
- Music by: Ilaiyaraaja
- Production company: Kavithalayaa Productions
- Release date: 11 November 1985
- Running time: 159 minutes
- Country: India
- Language: Tamil

Sindhu Bhairavi is a 1985 Indian Tamil-language musical drama film written and directed by K. Balachander. The film stars Sivakumar, Suhasini, and Sulakshana. It revolves around the three lead characters: a Carnatic singer, J. K. Balaganapathi (JKB), his wife, Bhairavi, and his girlfriend Sindhu. At the peak of his career, JKB gets addicted to alcohol following complications with his affair, and his career goes into a downward spiral.

Sindhu Bhairavi was released worldwide on 11 November 1985, and opened to positive reviews from critics, and it was a blockbuster. The film won three National Awards for Best Actress (Suhasini), Best Music Direction (Ilaiyaraaja) and Best Female Playback Singer (K. S. Chithra), in addition to the Filmfare Award for Best Film – Tamil. The film has a sequel in the format of a television series named Sahana (2003), produced by Balachander, with Sulakshana reprising her role.

== Plot ==
J. K. Balaganapathi (JKB) is a gifted Carnatic singer, but his wife Bhairavi, despite her love and loyalty, fails to satisfy or challenge him intellectually. For JKB, this and her inability to have children are problems. JKB's band includes the mridangam player Gurumoorthy and the tanpura player Gajapathi, who is a compulsive liar.

JKB attends a concert and finds Gurumoorthy drunk. He instructs Gurumoorthy to leave the premises and perform in the concert without using the mridangam, a compulsory instrument for a Carnatic concert. When Gurumoorthy is asked to leave the band permanently, he promises not to drink again.

When Bhairavi's grandfather is going to receive his pension (which he does on the first of every month), Gajapathi lies to him, saying it has been cancelled. The grandfather starts crying, and JKB intervenes to confirm that his pension is not cancelled and that he can collect it. JKB then scolds Gajapathi and tells him that the grandfather could have died on hearing such a lie, as he is very particular about his pension. Following this, when JKB finds that Gajapathi has lied to him and others, causing problems, he asks him to promise to tell the truth.

Sindhu, a music teacher, attends one of JKB's concerts, where he performs a Tyagaraja keerthana in Telugu. She finds some audience members speaking to each other instead of listening to the music. She asks JKB to translate the song he is singing into Tamil so the audience can understand. He then gets angry and challenges her to demonstrate. She successfully demonstrates it and is applauded by the audience, causing JKB to leave without finishing the concert.

A few days later, Sindhu apologises to JKB, and he realizes she is an intellectual equal and admires her musical knowledge. However, this intellectual attraction is misunderstood based on cultural limitations. Gajapathi, who has promised not to lie, informs Bhairavi that her husband is going out with Sindhu. Meanwhile, Sindhu has fallen for JKB, and both get intimate.

One day, Bhairavi catches JKB leaving Sindhu's apartment. Sindhu is seen as a homewrecker and is forced to end her association with JKB. He pines for her and leans on alcohol for support, which leads to his downward spiral, ending in an embarrassing barter of his musical knowledge for a drink. He even steals money from Bhairavi's grandfather, which leads to his death. Sindhu reenters his life and brings him around; however, she has her own secret: she is pregnant. After Sindhu rehabilitates JKB, his friends pressure her to leave town and never come back, which she does the next day. Bhairavi and JKB are distraught as Bhairavi had agreed to let JKB marry Sindhu.

Months later, during one of JKB's concerts, Sindhu comes back and sits down to listen to his music. However, she refuses to marry JKB, saying she would not deny Bhairavi her rights. Instead, she leaves them a "present": Sindhu gives up her child to be raised by Bhairavi in a classic act of defiance to society's rules and leaves town to pursue and share her musical knowledge with the less fortunate.

== Cast ==
- Sivakumar as J. K. Balaganapathy (JKB)
- Suhasini as Sindhu
- Sulakshana as Bhairavi
- Manimala as Sindhu's mother
- Pratap as Sanjeevi
- Delhi Ganesh as Gurumoorthy
- Janagaraj as Gajapathy
- T. S. Raghavendra as Judge Bharathi Kannan
- Krishnan as Bharathi Kannan's driver
- Sundaramoorthy as JKB's driver

== Production ==
Sivakumar recalled the instance when he had to grapple with high tides when he sat on the rocks at the Visakhapatnam beach during the shoot. He recalled, "Nothing would deter KB [Balachander] from extracting the best out of the actors. He would ask us to get ready for a retake even if he finds a slightest slip in our performance". When offered to act in the film by Balachander, Suhasini agreed after knowing that he would enact and explain every scene. Suhasini and Sulakshana's characters were named after the two parts of the name of the Carnatic raga, Sindhu Bhairavi. Delhi Ganesh was asked by Balachander to portray a mridangam player, and though he did not know how to play the instrument, he had a sense of rhythm and soon became "engrossed in the role". Pratap Pothen shot for 15 days, but his scenes did not make the final cut. While shooting for the film in Vishakapatnam, Balachander saw America Alludu (1985) and sought permission from K. Vasu to reuse a scene that Ananthu had suggested.

== Themes and influences ==
The film's theme is based on extramarital affairs interwoven with Carnatic music. Ajayan Bala stated: "most compatible minds in Sindhu Bhairavi, the singer and his fan, were not allowed to live together, even after the wife reconciled herself to that". Kandhasamy, Balachander's son-in-law, stated, "Sindhu Bhairavi established the sanctity of the institution of marriage and the dignity of the concubine". Sowmya Rajendran compared the film to another Sivakumar starrer Rosappu Ravikkaikari (1979) due to adultery being the mutual theme, the difference being that Sivakumar's character in Sindhu Bhairavi is the adulterous one, unlike Rosappu Ravikkaikari where it is Deepa's character who plays Sivakumar's wife.

== Popular culture ==
Sindhu Bhairavi was parodied in the Star Vijay comedy series Lollu Sabha, in an episode named "Sindhu By Ravi". In one of the episodes of "Thirukkural with the Times," Bharathi Bhaskar stated that she is reminded of the Tamil film Sindhu Bhairavi, one of K. Balachander's finest. In the film, JKB, a married man and a celebrated singer, has an affair with Sindhu, his admirer. After much turmoil and soul-searching, his family agrees to a second marriage. But Sindhu walks away. Her reason—she does not want to become the precedent for moral compromise. If a great artist like JKB bends the code of public probity, she fears others will use him as a license to do the same. She chooses obscurity over validation. The film's climax, like Valluvar's couplet 137: "From propriety of conduct men attain greatness; from impropriety springs disgrace that none can bear," is a meditation on the burden of those in the public eye. Fame, power, and influence are not shields—they are mirrors that magnify every flaw.

== Music ==
Sindhu Bhairavi's soundtrack featured nine songs composed by Ilaiyaraaja and written by Vairamuthu and Vaali. It is also Balachander's maiden collaboration with Ilaiyaraaja, forgoing his usual associations with M. S. Viswanathan. The soundtrack consisted of folk and classical music, with most of the songs are set in Carnatic ragas. The soundtrack also featured adaptations of works from Muthuswami Dikshitar, Subramania Bharati and Tyagaraja.

== Release and reception ==
Sindhu Bhairavi was released on 11 November 1985, during Diwali. In a review dated, 24 November 1985, Tamil magazine Ananda Vikatan rated the film 55 out of 100. Jayamanmadhan of Kalki wrote in the backdrop of sea waves, memorable locations many of the stories have been woven so densely and added it is the special touch of the director that the film is arranged seamlessly by adding threads to each other while calling Ilaiyaraaja and Yesudas as plus points. Anna praised acting, music, cinematography and direction and noted the first half of the film flows like a calm, clear stream. But in the last few reels of the film, the confusion rears your head as if makers felt people will accept this ending or not yet called it another diamond crown in Balachander's career. The film was a major commercial success, running for over 175 days in theatres. The 175th day celebration was held at a theatre in Madurai.

== Accolades ==
At the 33rd National Film Awards, Sindhu Bhairavi won in three categories: Best Actress (Suhasini), Best Music Direction (Ilaiyaraaja) and Best Female Playback Singer (K. S. Chithra). The film also won the Filmfare Award for Best Film – Tamil.

== Sequel ==
A sequel in the form of a TV series named Sahana, also created by Balachander, premiered on Jaya TV on 24 February 2003. While JKB and Sindhu were portrayed by Y. G. Mahendran and Anuradha Krishnamoorthy, Sulakshana was the only actor to return in the same role.

== Bibliography ==
- Dhananjayan, G. (2014). Pride of Tamil Cinema: 1931–2013. Blue Ocean Publishers. OCLC 898765509.
- Rajadhyaksha, Ashish; Willemen, Paul (1998) [1994]. Encyclopaedia of Indian Cinema. British Film Institute and Oxford University Press. ISBN 0-19-563579-5.
