= Geetha Kailasam =

Indian film actress and producer

- Occupation: Actress
- Years active: 1996-2004; 2018-present
- Spouse: Bala Kailasam
- Parent: K. Balachander (father-in-law)

Geetha Kailasam is an Indian film producer and actress who has been predominantly working on Tamil-language films. Her father-in-law K. Balachander was a veteran film director and her husband Bala Kailasam was also a filmmaker. She produced films under the production banner Minbimbangal.

== Career ==
She pursued her career as a chartered accountant, although she initially developed a firm interest and passion towards pursuing her career in acting. Following her marriage with K. Balachander's son, Bala Kailasam, she took over the control of the Minbimbangal film production banner by auditing financial statements and later gradually began concentrating on producing commercial feature films, while also balancing her career aspirations as a chartered accountant. She encouraged young female artists to utilise their skills effectively in order to stay relevant in the film industry, as such artists were under the watchful eyes of her during film shooting sessions funded by her film production company Minbimbangal.

She produced television soap operas like Anni and Sahana, which were under the helm of her father-in-law K. Balachander's direction, as he also handled the story and screenplay of such television soap operas. In April 2018, she directed her debut theatre play titled Oru Sila Pala Nimidamum Pechum as a tribute to K. Balachander and the play was based on the struggles women face in daily life. Following her husband's death in 2014, she made the decision to act in films to look after her family as a breadwinner and asked for callsheets from filmmakers to cast her in films.

In 2019, she was signed up to play a role in Ganesh Babu's directorial venture Kattil, after being approached with the script narrated by Ganesh Babu to her, and upon listening to the script, she felt that there is a scope for her in terms of showcasing her acting potential. She began playing supporting roles in films, primarily in characterisation of motherhood roles including Maamannan (2023), Star (2024), Lubber Pandhu (2024), Amaran (2024) and Angammal (2024). In Amaran, she played Major Mukund Varadarajan (Sivakarthikeyan)'s mother, which showcased a paradoxical mother-son relationship due to the creative differences that erupt between them over the military.

== Filmography ==
=== As an actress ===
==== Films ====
Year	Film	Role	Notes
2021	Sarpatta Parambarai	Rangan’s wife	
2022	Veetla Vishesham	Nurse	
2022	Natchathiram Nagargiradhu	Arjun's mother	
2022	Vendhu Thanindhathu Kaadu	Selvi	
2022	Anel Meley Pani Thuli	Anitha’s mother	
2023	Kattil		
2023	Maamannan	Veerayi	
2023	License	Judge	
2024	Lover	Arun’s mother	
2024	Star	Kamala Pandian	
2024	Lubber Pandhu	Poomalai’s mother	
2024	Neela Nira Sooriyan		
2024	Dear	Vasanthi	
2024	Raayan	Durai’s wife	
2024	Amaran	Geetha Varadarajan	
2025	Madraskaaran	Sathya’s mother	
2025	Tharunam	Rohit’s mother	
2025	Yamakaathaghi	Leela’s mother	
2025	Maaman	Inba and Girija’s mother	
2025	Madras Matinee	“Pachondi” Prema	
2025	Peranbum Perungobamum		
2025	Oho Enthan Baby	Raji	
2025	Idli Kadai	Kasthuri	
2025	Angammal	Angammal	
2025	Aaryan	Raziya’s mother	
2026	Mayilaa		
2026	Oh Butterfly	Soda Buddi Kezhavi	
2026	Happy Raj	Gomathi Kathamuthu	
2026	Pyaar Prema Kalyanam	Nirmala	

==== Television series ====
- Navarasa (2023) as Chitra Amma
- Inspector Rishi (2024) as Faria

=== As a producer ===
==== Television series ====
- Marmadesam
- Ramany vs Ramany
- Veetukku Veedu Looty
- Anni
- Sahana

== Awards and nominations ==
Year	Award	Category	Work	Result	Ref.
2025	Indian Film Festival of Melbourne	Best Actor (Female)	Angammal	Won	
