= Purusha Pretham =

2023 Indian film

- Poster
- Directed by: Krishand
- Written by: Ajith Haridas; Manu Thodupuzha
- Produced by: Dijo Augustine; Jomon Jacob; Einstin Zac Paul; Vishnu Rajan; Sajin Raj; Prasanth Alexander
- Starring: Alexander Prasanth; Darshana Rajendran; Jagadish
- Cinematography: Krishand
- Distributed by: SonyLIV
- Release date: 24 March 2023
- Country: India
- Language: Malayalam

Purusha Pretham (transl. Male Ghost) is a 2023 Indian Malayalam-language police procedural film directed by Krishand and produced under the banners of Mankind cinemas and Einstein Media by Jomom Jacob, Dijo Augustine and Einstein Zac Paul. The film features Alexander Prasanth, Darshana Rajendran, Jagadish, Maala Parvathi, Rahul Rajagopal and Geethi Sangeetha in prominent roles. The screenplay Ajith Haridas, Vysakh Reetha is the chief associate director for the movie. The film is a police procedural story. The film was released on 24 March 2023 via SonyLIV.

== Plot ==
SI Super Sebastian is a police officer known for his exaggerated tales of heroism. He thrives on the attention he receives from recounting his adventures, though the reality is often far from his dramatic retellings. Corrupt like many of his peers, he still knows his job well. His loyal subordinate, Dileep, follows orders despite his own experience, trusting Sebastian to have his back. Dileep shelters his daughter and son-in-law in police quarters, despite the growing tension over why he must always be at Sebastian's service.

One day, a dead body is found floating in the water, causing a jurisdictional dispute. Neither Sebastian's team nor the police from the opposite side of the river want to claim it. A handyman named Kesavan is bribed to push the body into Sebastian's jurisdiction, forcing them to handle it. Kesavan steals a ring from the body, later confessing to Dileep, who takes it but keeps it hidden. Torn between submitting it as evidence or selling it, Dileep is unaware of the consequences this decision will bring.

Sebastian and his team reluctantly take up the case, prioritizing closing it quickly over a proper investigation. Days later, with the mortuary full, Dileep suggests burying the body in a public cemetery. Sebastian assigns him the task, and Dileep passes it to a gravedigger. Meanwhile, Sebastian flirts with Sujatha, a woman searching for her missing husband, enjoying the casual relationship they share.

Just as the case seems closed, Susanna, a woman from another city, arrives claiming the buried body is her husband's. She demands exhumation, but Sebastian refuses, citing discrepancies in her description. Susanna files a habeas corpus, forcing the police to exhume the body—only to discover it's missing. Chaos ensues as blame is passed around. Dileep confesses he never supervised the burial, further implicating both himself and Sebastian. Susanna accuses the police of selling the body to a medical college, leading to Sebastian and Dileep's suspension.

Determined to clear their names, they track down Gopalan, the drunk gravedigger, who helps them recover the body. DNA results confirm Susanna's claim, pushing them further into trouble. Dileep finally reveals he has the stolen ring, which contradicts Susanna's version of events. Sebastian keeps it, hoping for a way out.

As he falls into despair, Sujatha helps care for his mother, and they develop real feelings for each other. One day, she finds the ring and recognizes it as her missing husband's. This revelation proves the buried body was hers, not Susanna's. Sebastian confronts Susanna before she leaves for America. She admits to bribing officials for closure but denies killing her husband—though she does confess to orchestrating his murder.

Susanna's brother attacks Sebastian and leaves him for dead in a well. However, Dileep, suspecting trouble, finds and rescues him. Later, Sebastian embellishes the story, portraying himself as the hero once again. Despite everything, he remains the star of his own show, content as long as people believe his tales.

== Cast ==
- Alexander Prasanth as SI Sebastian
- Darshana Rajendran as Susanna
- Jagadish as CPO Dileep
- Devaki Rajendran as Sumathi
- Maala Parvathi as Public Prosecutor Adv. Bhanumathy
- Balaji Sarma as Police surgeon
- Surjith Gopinath as Gopalan

== Release ==
The film was released on 24 March 2023 on the OTT platform SonyLIV.

=== Reception ===
A critic from The Hindu wrote that "The humorous narrative of ‘Purusha Pretham’ packs a punch as it holds a mirror to the discrimination and red-tapism in the hierarchical police force and in society at large". A critic from The Times of India wrote that "A surprising and refreshing movie, Purusha Pretham, shows the humour in the grim lives of people in various sections of society and in terrible situations in life". A critic from The Indian Express wrote that "If Aavasavyuham was an arbit documentation of an amphibian hunt, Purusha Pretham, starring Darshana Rajendran and Prasanth Alexander, is an arbit documentation of a comedy of errors".
