= Angammal =

Indian Tamil-language drama film

- Theatrical release poster
- Directed by: Vipin Radhakrishnan
- Screenplay by: Vipin Radhakrishnan; Sudhakar
- Based on: Kodithuni by Perumal Murugan
- Produced by: Shamsudeen Khalid
- Starring: Geetha Kailasam; Saran Shakthi; Thendral Raghunathan; Bharani
- Cinematography: Anjoy Samuel
- Edited by: Pradeep Shankar
- Music by: Mohammed Maqbool Mansoor
- Production companies: Njoy Films; Firo Movie Station
- Release dates: 19 October 2024 (MAMI); 5 December 2025 (India)
- Country: India
- Language: Tamil

Angammal is a 2025 Indian Tamil-language drama film directed by Vipin Radhakrishnan and starring Geetha Kailasam in the titular role alongside Saran Shakthi, Thendral Raghunathan and Bharani.

The film was released on 19 October 2024 at MAMI. The film is scheduled to have a theatrical release on 5 December 2025.

== Plot ==
Angammal refuses to wear the blouse of her sari when her newly returned doctor son, Pavalam, returns to the village to marry Jasmine.

== Cast ==
- Geetha Kailasam as Angammal
- Saran Shakthi as Pavalam
- Thendral Raghunathan as Shaaradha
- Bharani as Sudalai
- Yasmine as Manju
- Mullaiyarasi as Jasmine
- Vinod as Kaalimuthu
- Yuvarani

== Production ==
The film was in making for two years and was shot in Padmaneri village near Tirunelveli.

== Music ==
The single titled "Chendipoova" was released on 3 December 2025.

Track listing
No.	Title	Lyrics	Singer(s)	Length
1.	"Chendipoova (ver 1)"	Muthamil	K. S. Chitra
2.	"Chendipoova (ver 2)"	Muthamil	Sublahshini
3.	"Uchani Poo"	Vaisagh	Mohammed Maqbool Mansoor

== Reception ==
Anandu Suresh of The Indian Express gave 4/5 stars and wrote, "Vipin Radhakrishnan’s brilliance shines in the minimalist yet sharp way he has constructed the film’s environment, particularly since the story is set in a bygone era and that too in a remote village." Abhinav Subramaniam of The Times of India gave 3.5/5 stars and wrote "The film lands because it refuses to pick sides or wrap things neatly. These people are stubborn, flawed, and contradictory, and the script lets them stay that way through the end." Anusha Sundar of OTT Play gave 3.5/5 stars and wrote "Angammal is a simple, budgeted indie film, that has more to offer than just a slice-of-life drama. Without coming down heavy on you, it leaves some poignant thoughts to ponder and exude a sense of liberation. [...] A well-made, written, and enacted film, Angammal is a watch that will leave you with more thoughts, simple yet profound." Janani K of India Today gave 3.5/5 stars and wrote "Vipin Radhakrishnan's direction shows maturity and sensitivity in handling a story that could easily have slipped into melodrama. He allows the characters to breathe, giving them space to reveal themselves gradually. [...] Despite its many strengths, Angammal isn't without flaws. The film's exploration of Angammal's relationship with the man she likes feels underdeveloped."

Bhuvanesh Chandar of The Hindu wrote "Vipin Radhakrishnan’s film tells a warm and poignant story about an elderly widow fighting for the freedom to be herself as she grapples with the changing tides of time." Tanushree Ghosh of Moneycontrol wrote, "The film Angammal doesn’t give easy answers, leaving the audience with questions and aptly casts Geetha Kailasam, who carries the story/film on her broad shoulders and majestic body language, so much so that even the commercial bits don’t take away from the essence of Murugan’s story."

== Awards and nominations ==
Year	Award	Category	Recipient(s)	Result	Ref.
2025	New York Indian Film Festival	Best Film	Angammal	Won	
2025	Indian Film Festival of Melbourne	Best Actor (Female)	Geetha Kailasam	Won	
2025	Indian Film Festival of Melbourne	Best Indie Film	Angammal	Won	
