= Mmmmm =

Malayalam film

- Directed by: Vijeesh Mani
- Written by: Vijeesh Mani; Prakash Vadikkal
- Produced by: Sohan Roy
- Starring: I. M. Vijayan; Semmalar Annam; Nanjiyamma
- Cinematography: Mohan Ram
- Edited by: B. Lenin
- Music by: Srikanth Deva
- Production company: Aries Telecasting
- Release date: 2021
- Country: India
- Language: Malayalam

Mmmmm is a Malayalam film directed by Vijeesh Mani and produced by Sohan Roy. The film revolves around honey hunters from the Kurumba tribe. With a decline in honey bee population, there are fewer beehives and the film shows how this impacts their livelihood. The title denotes the sound of buzzing honey bees.

== Cast ==
- I. M. Vijayan
- Semmalar Annam
- Nanjiyamma

== Songs ==
The song "Paathyile Nerunki Mollu" was sung by Nanjiyamma and recorded at Sreeragam studio on 30 August.
