= Rajhesh Vaidhya =

Indian musician

Rajhesh Vaidya
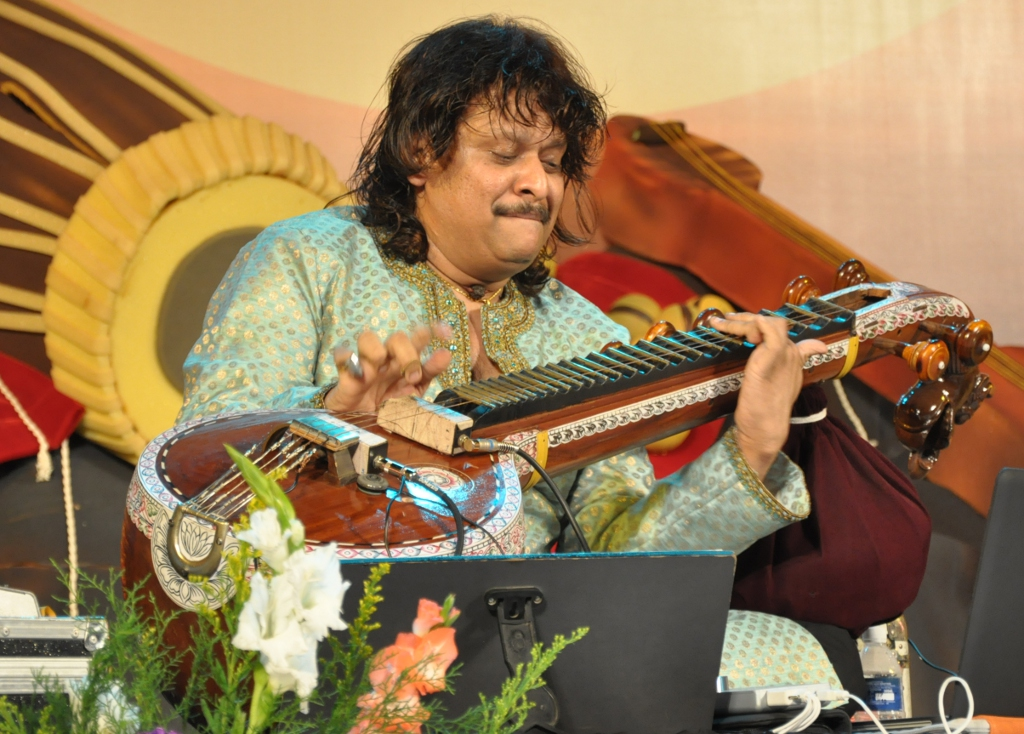
- Rajhesh Vaidhya performing at Nishagandhi festival, Trivandrum

Background information
- Born: 14 June 1973 (age 53)
- Occupations: Composer, veena player

Rajhesh Vaidhya is an Indian veena player, known for his work in Tamil films and television and on stage. Vaidhya was a winner of the 2010 Kalaimamani award for his veena playing.

== Career ==
Rajhesh Vaidhya performed as a guest artist at a French ballet, where he performed in one concert in Paris with Elton John. He composed the music for K. Balachander's Sahana, a television series. In 2004, he started the Ravna The International School in Chennai and later in Coimbatore.

He started a short video series which is of 1 minute duration on his social media pages in March 2019. He did a live show of 60 minutes where he performed 60 songs in 60 minutes, which was recognised by the Asia Book of Records in 2019. In 2023, he announced the creation of the band, SRUSTHTi.

== Discography ==
=== Composer ===
Films

- Vegam (2007)
- Shot Boot Three (2022)

Serials

- Marmadesam - Edhuvum Nadakkum (2001)
- Sahana (2003)
- Anni (2003)
- Veettukku Veedu Lootty (2003)
- Aadhi Parasakthi (2007)
- Magal (2007)
- Comedy Colony (2009)
- Dhayam (2009; title song only)

== Filmography ==
=== Television ===
Year	Title	Role	Network	Ref.
2018	Super Singer 6	Himself	Star Vijay	
