= Vadham =

2021 Indian web series by Rajapandi

- Release poster
- Genre: Crime
- Directed by: Venkatesh Babu
- Starring: Sruthi Hariharan; Ashwathy Warrier; Semmalar Annam; Preethisha Premkumaran
- Theme music composer: Prithwick
- Country of origin: India
- Original language: Tamil
- No. of seasons: 1

Production
- Editor: J. V. Manikanda Balaji
- Camera setup: Rakesh; Sridhar; Colin Titus

Original release
- Network: MX Player
- Release: 12 February 2021

Vadham is a 2021 Indian Tamil-language crime web series produced for MX Player, written and directed by Venkatesh Babu. It stars Sruthi Hariharan in the lead role with Ashwathy Warrier, Semmalar Annam and Preethisha Premkumaran in supporting roles. The series revolves around an IPS office, who sets out to solve the murder of an influential businessman with an all-women task force. The series was released in Tamil on 12 February 2021, alongside dubbed Telugu and Hindi versions.

== Cast ==
- Sruthi Hariharan as Sakthi Pandiyan
- Ashwathy Warrier as Ramani Chandran
- Semmalar Annam as Mercy
- Preethisha Premkumaran as Maya
- Vivek Rajgopal as Divakar
- M. J. Shriram as Anandhan
- Pasanga Sivakumar as Sakthi's father

== Production ==
The series was primarily shot in 2018, and had a delayed release in 2021.

== Release ==
The web series was released on 12 February 2021 on MX Player. A critic from Times of India noted "while the show’s screenplay lacks the punch of an action thriller at places, it is backed by a solid performance by its stellar lead women — Sruthi Hariharan, Ashwathy Warrier, Semmalar Annam and Preetheesha Premkumaran". A review from entertainment portal FilmCompanion noted "released with minimal fanfare, Vadham is built on noble intentions. Venkatesh Babu, the director, goes on to prove that vision matters the most." Another reviewer from IWM Buzz noted "as far as aspirational law-enforcement dramas go, Vadham takes the cake …and the kick." Deccan Herald also gave the series a positive review, adding "the biggest plus of the series is its portrayal of the police as being as human as anyone else. The writing, though, needed to be tighter." In contrast, a reviewer from FirstPost noted "Vadham lacks assurance to try anything new, resting on the tried-and-tested formulae, even going so far to endorse custodial deaths."

Sruthi Hariharan announced that a second season of Vadham was being planned during an interview in March 2021.
