= Neela Nira Sooriyan =

2024 Indian-Tamil language film

- Theatrical release poster
- Directed by: Samyuktha Vijayan
- Written by: Samyuktha Vijayan
- Produced by: Mala Manyan
- Starring: Samyuktha Vijayan; Kitty Krishnamoorthy; Gajaraj; Masanth Natarajan
- Cinematography: Steev Benjamin
- Edited by: Steev Benjamin
- Music by: Steev Benjamin
- Production company: First Copy Productions
- Distributed by: Xforia Igene
- Release date: 4 October 2024
- Country: India
- Language: Tamil

Neela Nira Sooriyan (English: Blue Sunshine) is a 2024 Indian Tamil-language film written and directed Samyuktha Vijayan who also stars in the lead role alongside Kitty Krishnamoorthy, Gajaraj, Geetha Kailasam, KVN Manimegalai, Prasanna Balachandran, Masanth Natarajan and others in supporting roles.

Neela Nira Sooriyan was released theatrically on 4 October 2024.

== Synopsis ==
The film revolves around a high school teacher Aravind who hails from a small town in Tamil Nadu and has to undergo a courageous journey to transition from male to female in a conservative community.

== Cast ==
- Samyuktha Vijayan as Bhanu a.k.a. Aravind
- Kitty Krishnamoorthy
- Gajaraj
- Geetha Kailasam
- Masanth Natarajan as Karthik
- KVN Manimegalai
- Semmalar Annam
- Prasanna Balachandran
- Nakkalites Vaideeshwari
- Nakkalites Aniruth

== Production ==
The films marks the debut of a Seattle-based Indian trans woman entrepreneur, techie and film-maker Samyuktha Vijayan's maiden project in Tamil cinema. The film was produced by Mala Manyan under the banner of First Copy Productions and released in Tamil Nadu by Xforia Igene. Steev Benjamin did the cinematography, editing, and music.

== Release ==
=== Theatrical ===
Neela Nira Sooriyan was released theatrically on 4 October 2024.

=== Home media ===
Neela Nira Sooriyan was premiered on Aha on 8 March 2025, coinciding with Women's day.

== Awards and recognitions ==
The film was selected to be screened in the Indian Panorama section at the 54th International Film Festival of India (IFFI). and at the Glasgow Film Festival, 2024. The film was one among the three Tamil titles screened at the Indian Film Festival of Melbourne (IIFM 2024), while the other two being S. U. Arun Kumar's Chithha (2023) and Ajai Vishwanath's short film, Starch.

== Reception ==
Anusha Sundar of OTT Play gave 3.5/5 stars and wrote "[...] With neat performances, strong writing, and clean execution, Neela Nira Sooriyan is just like its title- soothing and shining."

Avinash Ramachandran of The Indian Express gave 3.5/5 stars and wrote "Neela Nira Sooriyan is less like a pamphlet that can be discarded on a whim, and more like those ‘important questions’ students want to read before the exams. It might not be enough, but it is necessary."

Bhuvanesh Chandar of The Hindu wrote "Neela Nira Sooriyan is a leap forward in the right direction for Tamil queer cinema. Neat performances, deft writing choices, excellent sound design, and a subtle treatment make it an engaging film to invest in."
