= Karanvir Malhotra =

Indian actor

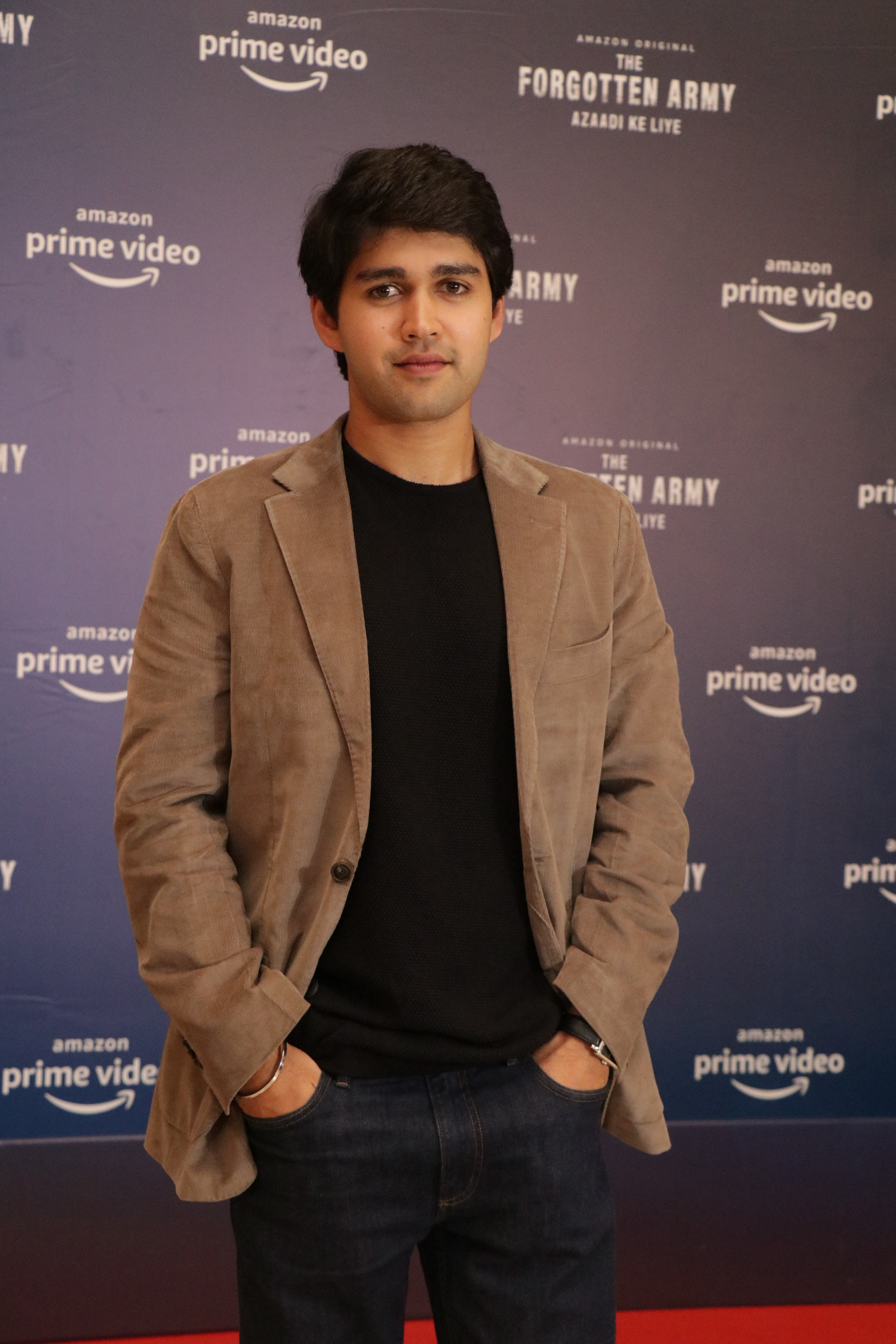
- Karanvir at the premiere of The Forgotten Army
- Born: October 4, 1995 (age 30); New Delhi, India
- Education: The Air Force School (TAFS); Delhi Public School
- Alma mater: Sri Venkateswara College (BCom); La Trobe University
- Occupation: Actor
- Years active: 2018–present

Karanvir Malhotra is an Indian actor who works primarily in Hindi television and films. He is known for his roles in Selection Day, Andhera, What Are the Odds, and The Forgotten Army.

== Early life and education ==
Malhotra was born in New Delhi, India. He was educated at The Air Force School and Delhi Public School, Dwarka, where he participated in academic, sporting, and co-curricular activities, including Model United Nations programmes. He later pursued a Bachelor of Commerce, commencing his studies at Sri Venkateswara College, Delhi University, and completing his degree at La Trobe University in Melbourne, Australia. His mother worked as a history teacher before later managing a medical centre in Melbourne, while his father is associated with the transport industry. He has one younger sibling.

== Career ==
Malhotra began his career by assisting filmmaker and producer Mitu Bhowmick Lange at Mind Blowing Films and working with the Indian Film Festival of Melbourne, before undertaking theatre training and transitioning into acting. He trained under Arjun Raina and performed with organisations including The Australian Shakespeare Company, as well as at festivals such as the Adelaide Fringe Festival, Melbourne Fringe Festival, and Short+Sweet Theatre Festival.

He made his first on-screen appearance in a Cadbury Dairy Milk commercial directed by Vinil Mathew. Malhotra made his acting debut in the Netflix sports drama series Selection Day, produced by Anil Kapoor, portraying the role of Javed Ansari. Released in two parts, his performance was described as that of a “dark horse” within the series. He subsequently appeared in the Amazon Prime Video series The Forgotten Army – Azaadi Ke Liye, directed by Kabir Khan, and the Netflix film What Are the Odds, directed by Megha Ramaswamy. The latter was noted for his performance, which was highlighted among the key elements of the coming-of-age narrative.

He later appeared in Rohit Shetty’s series Indian Police Force, portraying the character Sikku. In 2025, Malhotra played the lead role of Jay Sheth in Excel Entertainment’s supernatural thriller series Andhera, where his performance received positive critical attention. A review by The Times of India noted that he “convincingly captures Jay’s dual state of guilt over his brother’s condition and bewilderment at his surreal experiences”.

He is next set to appear in his first theatrical feature film as part of an ensemble cast led by Shah Rukh Khan in Siddharth Anand’s action thriller King.

== Filmography ==
=== Film ===
Year	Title	Role	Notes
2020	What Are the Odds	Ashwin	Netflix film
2026	King †	TBA	

=== Web series ===
Year	Title	Role	Platform
2018–2019	Selection Day	Javed Ansari	Netflix
2020	The Forgotten Army – Azaadi Ke Liye	Amar	Amazon Prime Video
2024	Indian Police Force	Sikku	Amazon Prime Video
2025	Andhera	Jay Sheth	Amazon Prime Video
