= Paradise (2023 Sri Lankan-Indian film) =

2023 drama film by Prasanna Vithanage

- First look poster
- Directed by: Prasanna Vithanage
- Written by: Prasanna Vithanage
- Screenplay by: Anushka Senanayake
- Produced by: Newton Cinema; Mani Ratnam; Siva Ananth
- Starring: Roshan Mathew; Darshana Rajendran; Shyam Fernando
- Cinematography: Rajeev Ravi
- Edited by: A. Sreekar Prasad
- Music by: K
- Production companies: Newton Cinema; Madras Talkies
- Release dates: 7 October 2023 (Busan); 28 June 2024
- Running time: 95 minutes
- Countries: Sri Lanka; India
- Languages: English; Sinhala; Malayalam; Tamil

Paradise is a 2024 Sri Lankan-Indian co-produced drama film, co-written and directed by Prasanna Vithanage. The film is presented by Mani Ratnam and Siva Ananth under the Madras Talkies banner and produced by Newton Cinema. It stars Roshan Mathew, Darshana Rajendran, Shyam Fernando and Mahendra Perera and tells the story of a married couple whose anniversary vacation goes awry in Sri Lanka.

Paradise had its world premiere at the 28th Busan International Film Festival on 7 October 2023, where it won the Kim Jiseok Award.

== Synopsis ==
An Indian tourist couple arrives in the hill country of crisis-ridden Sri Lanka to celebrate their fifth wedding anniversary. As events take an unexpected turn conflicts deepen, revealing cracks in their relationship.

== Cast ==
- Roshan Mathew as Kesav
- Darshana Rajendran as Amritha
- Shyam Fernando as Mr. Andrew (Tour Guide)
- Mahendra Perera as Sergeant Bandara
- Sumith Ilango as Shree
- Azher Samsoodeen as Iqbal
- Neeraja Rajendran as Amritha's Mother

== Release ==
Paradise had its world premiere at the 28th Busan International Film Festival on 7 October 2023 where it won the Kim Jiseok Award.

The film was screened at the Mumbai Film Festival in the “Icons: South Asia” section on 29 October 2023 for its South Asia premiere.

Paradise had its European premiere at the 30th Vesoul International Film Festival 2024. Subsequent premieres included the Beijing International Film Festival in China, the Red Lotus Asian Film Festival in Austria, and the Asiatiska Film Festival 2024 in Sweden.

The North American premiere took place at the New York Indian Film Festival 2024 and the Australian premiere occurred at the Sydney Film Festival 2024.

Paradise was featured in the “Features” section of the 71st Sydney Film Festival on 13 June 2024.

The film was released in theatres worldwide on 28 June 2024 and is now available on streaming platforms including Prime Video, Manorama Max and Simply South.

=== Festival appearances ===
Year	Festival
2023	Busan International Film Festival
2023	Mumbai Academy of the Moving Image (MAMI)
2023	International Film Festival of Kerala
2023	Dharamshala International Film Festival
2024	Vesoul International Film Festival
2024	Bengaluru International Film Festival
2024	Las Palmas de Gran Canaria International Film Festival
2024	Pune International Film Festival
2024	Shanghai International Film Festival
2024	Beijing International Film Festival
2024	New York Indian Film Festival
2024	Sydney Film Festival
2024	Cinevesture International Film Festival
2024	Indo German Film Week Festival
2024	Indian Film Festival of Melbourne
2024	Red Lotus Asian Film Festival
2024	Asiatiska Film Festivalen
2024	XVII International Film Festival Orenburg
2024	Kazan International Film Festival
2024	7th Ha Noi International Film Festival

== Reception ==
On the review aggregator website Rotten Tomatoes, 100% of 8 critics' reviews are positive, with an average rating of 7.6/10.

Lee Marshall reviewing for ScreenDaily at Busan wrote, "Moving through the narrative with admirable dexterity, despite some contrived passages, it's a well-made drama buoyed up by a raft of fine performances."

Saibal Chatterjee reviewing for NDTV rated the film 4.5/5 and wrote, "Unswerving in its grasp of both philosophy and psychology, Prasanna Vithanage's Paradise is a masterly evocation of the frailty of 'man' when faced with a crisis."

Santanu Das reviewing for Hindustan Times dubbed the film as "a stirring, important piece of work" and wrote, "As the drama inches its way closer to that shocking denouement, Paradise grapples to interrogate questions around politics and the state."

Priyanka Sundar reviewing for Firstpost at Mumbai Film Festival rated the film 3.5/5 and wrote, "By the end, whose side you are on speaks volumes about who you are as a person than of the film itself, the film brings about this reflection of self, and of society with poignancy and that more than anything makes Paradise a winner."

Deepa Gahlot of Rediff.com rated 4/5 stars and observed, "Prasanna Vithanage's Paradise leaves the audience to read between the lines and draw their own conclusions about the frailty of human nature, and how easily violence seizes the most unexpected prey. "

== Accolades ==
The film won the Kim Jiseok Award at the Busan International Film Festival. This award is presented to two outstanding films from the Jiseok competition section, which features new works by Asian directors who have directed more than three feature films.

Award	Date of ceremony	Category	Recipient(s)	Result	Ref.
Busan International Film Festival	13 October 2023	Kim Jiseok Award	Prasanna Vithanage	Won	
Vesoul International Film Festival of Asian Cinema	13 February 2024	Golden Cyclo	Prasanna Vithanage	Nominated	
Vesoul International Film Festival of Asian Cinema	13 February 2024	Prix du Jury Lycéen	Prasanna Vithanage	Won	
Asian Film Awards	10 March 2024	Best Film	Paradise	Nominated	
Asian Film Awards	10 March 2024	Best Director	Prasanna Vithanage	Nominated	
Asian Film Awards	10 March 2024	Best Editing	A. Sreekar Prasad	Nominated	
Asian Film Awards	10 March 2024	Best Screenplay	Prasanna Vithanage and Anushka Senanayake	Nominated	
New York Indian Film Festival	June 2024	Best Director	Prasanna Vithanage	Nominated	
New York Indian Film Festival	June 2024	Best Actor	Roshan Mathew	Nominated	
New York Indian Film Festival	June 2024	Best Actress	Darshana Rajendran	Nominated	
FIPRESCI Grand Prix 2023		Best Film	Paradise	Nominated	
Indian Film Festival of Melbourne		Best Film Subcontinent	Paradise	Nominated	
Las Palmas de Gran Canaria International Film Festival	27 April 2024	Audience Jury Award	Prasanna Vithanage	Won	
Kerala State Film Awards	3 November 2025	Best Story	Prasanna Vithanage	Won	
Kerala State Film Awards	3 November 2025	Special Jury Award	Prasanna Vithanage	Won	
Kerala State Film Awards	3 November 2025	Special Jury Award	Darshana Rajendran	Won	
