= Kiss (2022 film) =

Indian short film produced by Newton Cinema

- Directed by: Varun Grover
- Produced by: Anto Chittilappilly, Sanita Chittilappilly, Anurag Kashyap
- Starring: Adarsh Gourav, Swanand Kirkire
- Cinematography: Sylvester Fonseca
- Edited by: Nitin Baid
- Music by: Mayukh-Mainak
- Production company: Newton Cinema
- Distributed by: Mubi
- Release date: 2022
- Country: India
- Language: Hindi

Kiss is a 2022 Indian Hindi-language short film written and directed by Varun Grover in his directorial debut. The film is produced by Anto Chittilappilly and Sanita Chittilappilly under Newton Cinema. Anurag Kashyap is the executive producer of the film. The film features Adarsh Gourav, Swanand Kirkire, Chetan Sharma, Ashwath Bhatt and Shubhrajyoti Barat in pivotal roles. Blending science fiction with social satire, KISS explores the complexities of censorship, queer intimacy, and perception in contemporary Indian cinema.

== Plot ==
Set entirely within the confines of a Mumbai preview theatre, the movie follows Sam, a young filmmaker who faces scrutiny from the Indian Censor Board over a kissing scene in his new sci-fi drama. As the board members debate the appropriate length of the kiss, they rewatch the scene, only to find that each perceives its duration differently—ranging from 28 seconds to over two minutes. This discrepancy leads to a surreal unraveling of reality, highlighting how personal experiences and prejudices can distort perception.

== Cast ==
- Adarsh Gaurav as Sam
- Swanand Kirkire as Salil Aabid
- Ashwath Bhatt as Projectionist
- Shubhrajyoti Barat as Ramesh Chauhan
- Chetan Sharma as Rehan
- Aurobindo Bhatacharjee as Saxena
- Ravi Dudeja as Abhay

== Production ==
KISS marks Varun Grover's directorial debut, having previously established himself as a lyricist and screenwriter. The film was produced by Arya Menon and Shubham Karna (Odd & Even), with Anurag Kashyap serving as executive producer. Sylvester Fonseca handled cinematography, Nitin Baid was the editor, and the music was composed by Mayukh & Mainak. The film was produced under the Newton Cinema banner.

== Release ==
KISS premiered at the New York Indian Film Festival and was also screened at the Beijing Queer Film Festival in 2022. It was released on the streaming platform MUBI on June 1, 2025. The film was also selected for screening in the Cinema Regained section at the International Film Festival of Rotterdam 2025.

== Accolades ==
Year	Event	Category	Result
2022	Bengaluru International Short Film Festival	Indian Competition	Won
2022	Tasveer South Asian Film Festival	Best Narrative Short	Won
2022	New Generations Independent Indian Film Festival	Best Short	Won
2023	South Asian Film Festival of Montreal	Best Short Fiction	Won
2023	The Critics Choice Awards	Best Writing - Short Film	Won

== Festival appearances ==
Year	Festival
2022	Bengaluru International Short Film Festival
2022	Tasveer South Asian Film Festival
2022	New Generations Independent Indian Film Festival
2022	New York Indian Film Festival
2022	Beijing Queer Film Festival
2022	Moscow Shorts
2022	Prairie Pride Film Festival
2022	Indian Film Festival Of Melbourne
2022	International Documentary & Short Film Festival Of Kerala
2023	Dharmshala International Film Festival
2023	South Asian Film Festival of Montreal
2023	Critics Choice Award
2025	International Film Festival Rotterdam
