= Divya Prabha =

Indian actress

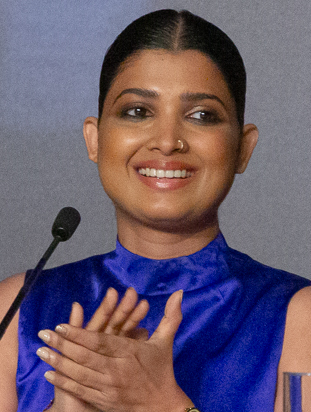
- Prabha in 2024
- Born: Thrissur, Kerala, India
- Occupation: Actress
- Years active: 2013–present

Divya Prabha is an Indian actress who predominantly appears in Malayalam films and television serials. She has starred in the independent films Ariyippu (2022) and All We Imagine as Light (2024).

== Career ==
Prabha's acting career started with small roles in movies before transitioning to television serials. She gained wider attention for her roles in the films Take Off and Thamaasha. In 2015, she won Kerala State Television Award for Best Second Actress for her performance in the TV serial Eswaran Sakshiyayi. She was nominated for Best Actress at the 2022 Locarno Film Festival in the international competition section for the movie Ariyippu directed by Mahesh Narayanan. The film premiered in the Concorso internazionale (international competition section) of the 75th Locarno Film Festival on 4 August 2022, where it was nominated for the Golden Leopard. The film had a worldwide release on Netflix on 16 December 2022. She plays one of the lead roles in All We Imagine as Light, directed by Payal Kapadia, which competed for the Palme d'Or at the 77th Cannes Film Festival and won the Grand Prix.

== Acting credits ==
=== Filmography ===
Key
†	Denotes films that have not yet been released

Year	Title	Role	Notes	Ref.
2013	Lokpal	Marketing staff		
2013	Mumbai Police	Journalist		
2013	Cold Storage	Princy		
2013	SIM	Komalam		
2014	Ithihasa	Aan		
2014	Kayal	Divya	Tamil film	
2014	Bhaiyya Bhaiyya	Korah's daughter		
2014	Pianist	Lekshmi		
2016	Vettah	Asha		
2017	Take Off	Jincy		
2018	Kammara Sambhavam	Kamala		
2018	Nonsense	Nurse		
2019	Prathi Poovankozhi	Jolly		
2019	Thamaasha	Babitha teacher		
2021	Nizhal	Dr. Shalini		
2021	Malik	Ayeesha		
2021	Kodiyil Oruvan	Arulmozhi	Tamil film	
2022	Ariyippu	Reshmi		
2023	Family	Rani		
2024	All We Imagine as Light	Anu		
2025	Sarkeet	Steffi		
2026	Masthishka Maranam	Destimona		

=== TV series ===
Year	Title	Role	Ref.
2014	Pattu Saree		Debut
2014–2015	Amma Manasam		
2015	Parasparam	Roma IPS	
2015–2016	Eswaran Sakshiyayi	Aparna Balachandran	
2016	Manassariyathe		

== Award and nominations ==
Kerala State Television Awards

- 2015: Kerala State Television Award for Best Second Actress– Eswaran Sakshiyayi (Malayalam Soap Opera - Flowers TV)

Locarno International Film Festival

- Nomination for the Best Actress at the Locarno International Film Festival in the International Competition Session for the Movie Ariyippu (2022).
