= Darshana Rajendran =

Indian actress and singer (born 17 June)

- Born: 17 June; Thiruvananthapuram, Kerala, India
- Education: Lady Shri Ram College; City St George's, University of London
- Occupations: Actress; playback singer
- Years active: 2014–present

Darshana Rajendran (born 17 June) is an Indian actress and playback singer who works predominantly in Malayalam films. She made her acting debut in 2014 with the Malayalam film John Paul Vaathil Thurakkunnu. Darshana had her career breakthrough with the 2022 Malayalam films—Hridayam and Jaya Jaya Jaya Jaya Hey. The latter earned her the Filmfare Award for Best Actress – Malayalam.

== Early life ==
Darshana was born on 17 June to Rajendran and Neeraja in Thiruvananthapuram. She studied Mathematics at the Lady Shri Ram College and Financial Economics at City, University of London, and worked for the Institute for Financial Management and Research in Chennai.

== Career ==
Darshana made her acting debut in 2014 with John Paul Vaathil Thurakkunnu. She went onto appear in supporting parts in films such as Mayaanadhi (2017), Koode (2018) and Virus (2019). She had her first major role in the 2020 film C U Soon, where she appeared opposite Fahadh Faasil. Saibal Chatterjee was appreciative of her "moving portrayal".

Darshana achieved her career breakthrough in 2022 with Hridayam and Jaya Jaya Jaya Jaya Hey. In Hridayam, she played an engineering student opposite Pranav Mohanlal. Sajin Shrijith stated, "Darshana is aptly cast in her role." A major commercial success, it was one of the highest grossing film of the year. She then played a domestic violence abuse opposite Basil Joseph in Jaya Jaya Jaya Jaya Hey. The film emerged a commercial success and earned her the Filmfare Award for Best Actress – Malayalam. Anna M. M. Vetticad noted, "Darshana chews up every scene in which the writing gives Jaya an inner presence. She is also undoubtedly congenitally attuned to action."

== Filmography ==
Key
†	Denotes films that have not yet been released

=== Films ===
Year	Title	Role	Language	Notes	Ref.
2014	John Paul Vaathil Thurakkunnu	Dr. Anna Paul	Malayalam	Debut film	
2015	Moone Moonu Varthai	Keerthi	Tamil	Bilingual film; debut in both languages	
2015	Moodu Mukkallo Cheppalante	Keerthi	Telugu	Bilingual film; debut in both languages	
2017	Samarppanam	Krishna	Malayalam		
2017	Kavan	Kalpana	Tamil		
2017	Mayaanadhi	Darshana	Malayalam		
2018	Koode	Alina	Malayalam		
2018	Irumbu Thirai	Selvi	Tamil		
2019	Vijay Superum Pournamiyum	Pooja	Malayalam		
2019	Virus	Anjali Vasudevan	Malayalam		
2020	C U Soon	Anumol Sebastian	Malayalam	Debut as lead actress in Malayalam; released on Amazon Prime Video	
2020	Theeviram	Alia	Tamil		
2021	Aanum Pennum	Rani	Malayalam	Segment: "Rani"	
2021	Irul	Archana Pillai	Malayalam	Released on Netflix	
2022	Hridayam	Darshana	Malayalam		
2022	Dear Friend	Jannath	Malayalam		
2022	Jaya Jaya Jaya Jaya Hey	Jayabharathi "Jaya"	Malayalam		
2023	Thuramukham	Khadeeja	Malayalam		
2023	Purusha Pretham	Susanna	Malayalam	Released on SonyLIV	
2023	Paradise	Amritha	Malayalam	Indian-Sri Lankan Co-production; Also shot in Sinhala	
2024	Rifle Club	Kaduvachalil Tresa "Kunjumol" Mary Skaria	Malayalam		
2025	Paradha	Amishta	Telugu		
2026	Patriot	Jyothi Kurian	Malayalam		
2026	Athiradi	Merin	Malayalam	Cameo appearance	

=== Television ===
Year	Title	Role	Language	Network	Notes	Ref.
2016	Ctrl Alt Del	Madhumitha	Tamil	YouTube	Web Debut	
2022	Unpaused: Naya Safar	Geetanjali	Hindi	Amazon Prime Video	Segment: "Gond Ke Laddu"	
2025	The Chronicles of the 4.5 Gang	Ramani	Malayalam	SonyLIV		

== Discography ==
Year	Film	Song	Ref.
2017	Mayaanadhi	"Bavra Mann"	
2021	Sarcas Circa 2020	"Kattuneerin Chaalilayi"	
2022	Hridayam	"Darshana"	
2022	Jaya Jaya Jaya Jaya Hey	"Ingottu Nokkanda"	

== Awards and nominations ==
Year	Award	Category	Film	Result	Ref.
2021	Filmfare Awards South	Best Actress – Malayalam	C U Soon	Nominated	
2021	South Indian International Movie Awards	Best Actress – Malayalam	C U Soon	Nominated	
2023	Filmfare Awards South	Best Actress – Malayalam	Jaya Jaya Jaya Jaya Hey	Won	
2023	South Indian International Movie Awards	Best Actress – Malayalam	Jaya Jaya Jaya Jaya Hey	Nominated	
2023	South Indian International Movie Awards	Best Actress Critics – Malayalam	Jaya Jaya Jaya Jaya Hey	Won	
2023	Kerala Film Critics Association Awards	Best Actress	Jaya Jaya Jaya Jaya Hey & Purusha Pretham	Won	
2024	Filmfare Awards South	Best Supporting Actress – Malayalam	Purusha Pretham	Nominated	
2024	South Indian International Movie Awards	Best Actress – Malayalam	Purusha Pretham	Nominated	
