= Semmalar Annam =

Indian film actress

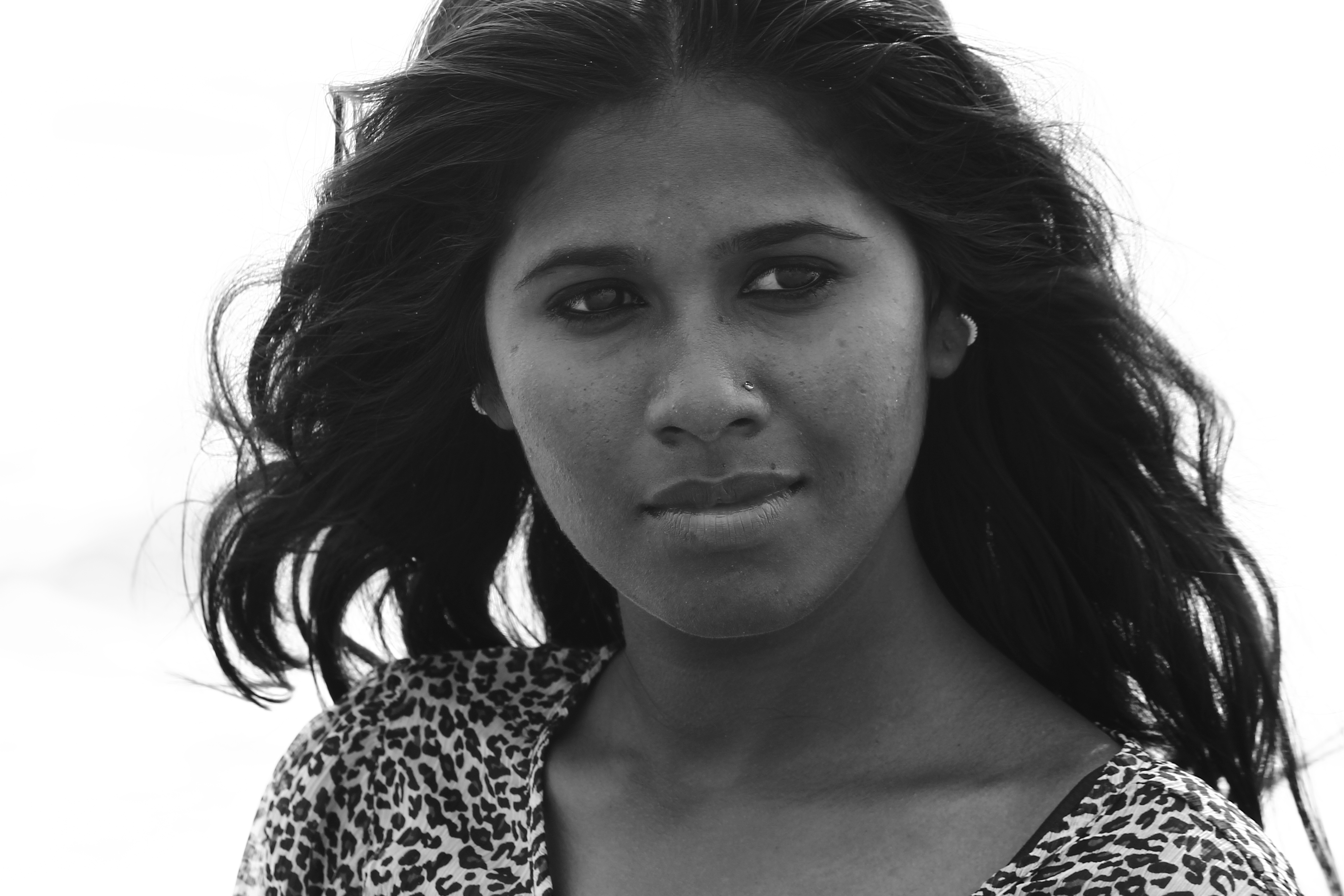
- Born: Semmalar Annam K. 20 August 1990 (age 36); Coimbatore, Tamil Nadu, India
- Occupation: Actress
- Years active: 2009–present

Semmalar Annam is an Indian actress and director who works in Tamil-language films. Her film Mayilaa was screened at Rotterdam International Film Festival. She has also directed and acted in more than fifteen short films during her studies at college. After making her feature film debut with Ammani (2016) directed by Lakshmy Ramakrishnan, she went on to star in films such as Maadathy (2019), Sennai (2021) and the Malayalam film Mmmmm (2021).

== Early life and career ==
"I believe in living my characters. So, when I am constantly offered such [unconventional] roles, it tends to take a toll on my emotions. It’s very difficult for a happy-go-lucky person like me. It might have to do with my skin tone as well as dark-skinned people are stereotyped in such characters in the film industry. We are not offered roles of a doctor or lawyer. It’s appalling."

— Semmalar Annam on the roles she gets due to her dark skin, 2021

After her schooling at Krishnamal Higher Secondary School Coimbatore, she joined for B.Sc., Visual Communication studies at PSG College of Arts and Science and later did her post graduation in Mass Communication and Journalism from PSG College of Arts and Science, Coimbatore. After her formal education, she underwent a course on acting and theater at the Stanislavsky Acting School, Chennai.

Semmalar's debut short film Malarmathi (2010), about a sexually abused orphan won the best film and best director award at Legend 2010, a state-level short film festival organized by Department of Visual Communication, Sathyabama University, Chennai.

In the film Ammani (2016), she plays the frustrated daughter-in-law of the main character: Salamma, a hard-working government hospital worker. Semmalar played major roles in several independent films such as Maadathy (2019), Sennai (2021), and the Malayalam film Mmmmm (2021) while she had minor roles in several major productions, with her roles in Valimai (2021) and Bachelor (2021) edited out from the final cuts. She played a dalit mother in Maadathy (2019). Regarding her performance, a critic wrote that "Semmarlar Annam in a yet another remarkable performance. How long will the mainstream filmmakers ignore her?" In Sennai, she played the lead role (again the character of a dalit) while she played a member of the honey hunter Kurumba tribe in Mmmmm. Regarding her performance in Thunikaram (2022), a critic wrote that "Though Semmalar Annam doesn't have much scope to perform, she does a decent job in the given time".

== Filmography ==
All films are in Tamil, unless otherwise noted.

As director

Year	Title	Notes	Ref.
2010	Malarmathi	Short films	
2010	Konangal	Short films	
2019	Muthal Mazhai (transl. First Rain)	Short films	
2026	Mayilaa	Premiere at IFFR	

As an actress

Year	Film	Role	Notes	Ref.
2016	Ammani	Amudha		
2017	Magalir Mattum	Housewife in Prabhavathy's documentary		
2017	Kurangu Bommai	Mother of kidnapped child		
2018	Street Lights	Malar	Malayalam film	
2019	Thambi	Gunavathi		
2019	Maadathy	Veni		
2019	Kattumaram	Malar		
2019	Sillu Karuppatti	Aishwarya	Turtles segment	
2020	Ponmagal Vandhal	A kid's mother		
2020	The Tremor	Mysterious woman		
2021	Sennai	Annam	Won—Rising Star Emerging Actress, Toronto Tamil International Film Festival, 2021	
2021	Mmmmm	Tribal woman	Malayalam film	
2022	Thunikaram	Semmalar		
2022	Repeat Shoe	Child trafficker's henchman		
2023	Yaathisai	Einar clan member		
2023	Thandatti	Virumayi		
2023	Maaveeran	Selvi		
2023	Appatha	Villager		
2023	The Road	Manga		
2023	Kattil			
2023	Aayiram Porkaasukal	Aarayi		
2024	Ayalaan	Cancer-affected girl's mother		
2024	Kalvan	District Forest Officer		
2024	Andhagan	Rasi		
2024	Neela Nira Sooriyan			
2025	Rambo			

=== Television ===
Year	Title	Role	Channel/Platform	Notes	Ref.
2012	Sakalakala Vallavan	Contestant	Kalaignar TV	Won the show	
2021	Vadham	Mercy	MX Player		
2024	Inspector Rishi	Mangai	Amazon Prime Video		
2024	Aindham Vedham	Bhavani	ZEE5		

=== As a dubbing artist ===
Year	Title	For whom	Language	Director	Ref.
2024	Lubber Pandhu	Swasika	Tamil	Tamizharasan Pachamuthu	
2025	Retro	Swasika	Tamil	Karthik Subbaraj	
2025	Maaman	Swasika	Tamil	Prasanth Pandiyaraj	
2026	Nooru Saami	Swasika	Tamil	Sasi	
2026	Modha Rathri	Shelly Kishore	Tamil	Raja Karuppasamy	
2026	Aakasamlo Oka Tara	Swasika	Tamil dubbed of Telugu film	Pavan Sadineni	
