= Bala Kailasam =

Indian documentary filmmaker and playwright

- Born: Bala Kailasam; 26 October 1960; Nannilam, Madras State, India
- Died: 15 August 2014 (aged 53)
- Occupation(s): Film director, Film producer, Screenwriter
- Spouse: Geetha Kailasam
- Parent(s): Kailasam Balachander (father); Rajam (mother)

Bala Kailasam (26 October 1960 – 15 August 2014) was an Indian documentary filmmaker and playwright who worked mainly in the Tamil film industry. He was the son of Tamil filmmaker Kailasam Balachander.

== Education ==
Bala Kailasam graduated in Electronics and Communication Engineering from the University of Madras in 1983 and trained in Film and Video Production at the University of Iowa in Iowa City.

== Career ==
Bala Kailasam was the Creative and Business Head of Min Bimbangal Productions Private Limited, which has produced TV programs in Tamil, Telugu, Malayalam, Kannada and Hindi. He was also the Creative Head of Puthiya Thalaimurai TV, 24-hour news channel in Tamil from 2011 to 2013.

== Filmography ==
- 1987 - The Twice Discriminated
- 1992 - Veli
- 1990 - Vaastu Marabu
- 1992 - Quality, Our Own Heritage
- 2009 - Writing on Water
- 2009 - Neerundu Nilamundu

== Television series ==
- 1993 - Raghuvamsam, Sun TV, Tamil
- 1995 -
  - Nayyandi Durbar
  - Kathai Alla Nijam
- 1996 - Marmadesam, Sun TV, Tamil
- 1998 - Ramany vs Ramany (Sitcom), Sun TV, Tamil
- 2000 - Veetukku Veedu Looty

== Memorials ==
The Bala Kailasam Memorial Award for excellence in documentary film-making was established by Cinema Rendezvous Trust to honor Bala Kailasam.
