= Abhija Sivakala =

Indian actress

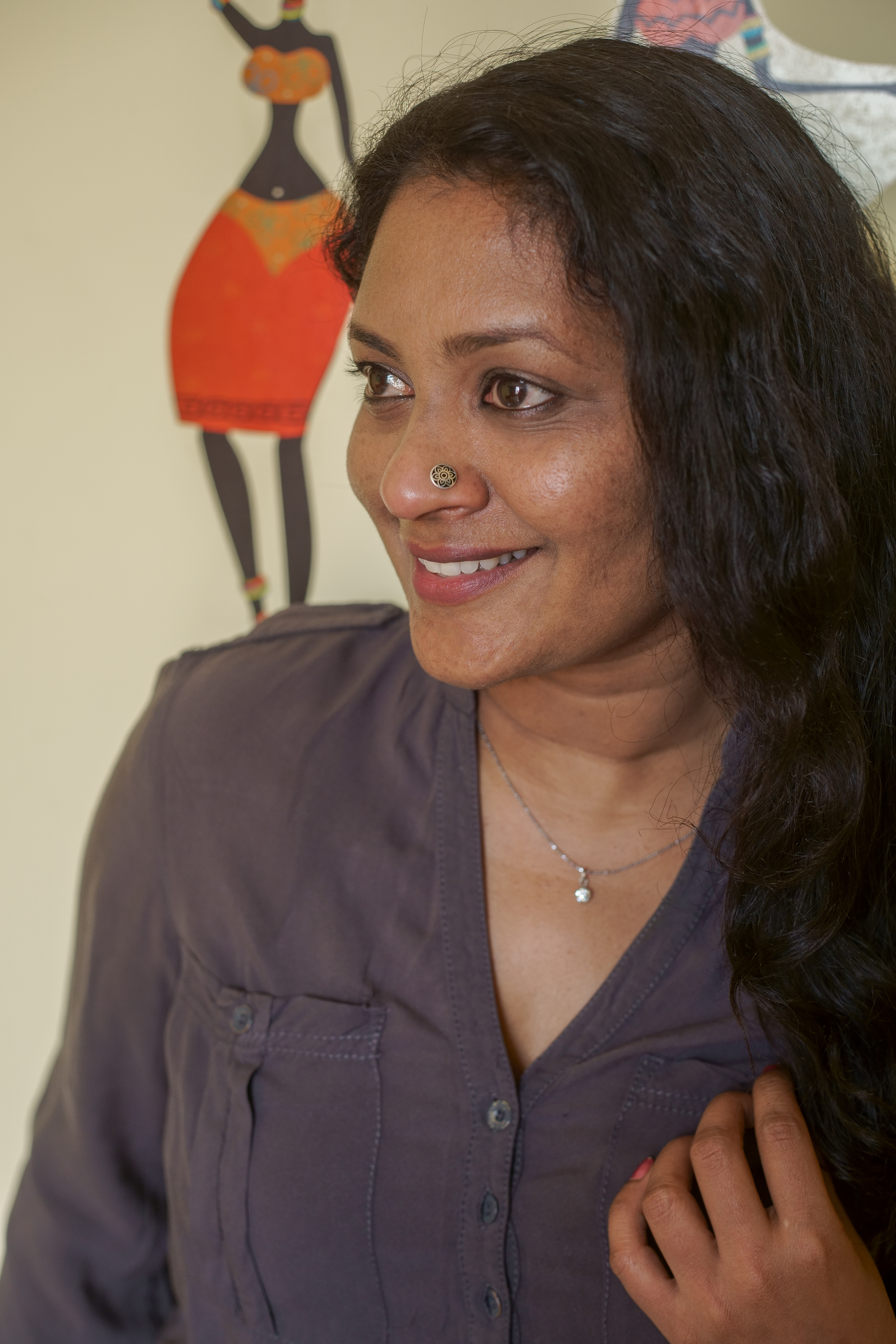
- Abhija in 2018
- Born: Vannappuram, Kerala, India
- Education: Bachelor of Fine Arts from College of Fine Arts Trivandrum
- Occupation: Actress
- Years active: 2010–present

Abhija Sivakala is an Indian actress in the Malayalam film industry. She is also a notable theatre artist and a dancer.

== Early life ==
Abhija was born in Vannapuram, a small town near Thodupuzha, Idukki district, Kerala. Her father, KR Sivadas and mother, KK Rugmini were both Government employees. She has a younger sister, Atmaja Manidas, who is also an artist and actress.

She completed her schooling from SNMHS, Vannapuram. She joined St Joseph's College, Moolamattam in the science stream only to realize that art was her passion. She then enrolled in College of Fine Arts Trivandrum and graduated in Applied Arts.

Abhija started her career as an animator in Amrita Vishwa Vidyapeetham, Coimbatore. She later moved to Bangalore and worked in various IT companies in the field of animation and visual designing.

== Dance ==
Bangalore opened up a lot of dance avenues for Abhija. She is trained in Kathak by Guru Murali Mohan Kalvakalva of Nadam and Odissi by Guru Sharmila Mukherjee of Sanjali Centre for Odissi Dance. She is also trained in folk and contemporary dance forms.

She has also attended dance workshops by Pandit Birju Maharaj, Saswati Sen; Surupa Sen, Bijayini Satpathy, Pavithra Reddy of Nrityagram; Bhriga Bessel to name a few.

== Theatre ==
A couple of years of professional life made Abhija realize that acting is her calling. Playing the lead role in Abhinaya Theatre Research Centre's Macbeth kick started her career in theatre. And since then, she has worked with many Indian and international directors like Elias Cohen (Chile), David Berga (Catalonia), Francoise Calvel (France), Alexandra (La Patriotico Interesante, a street theatre production group, Chile) etc.

Name	Details
Macbeth	An independent adaptation of William Shakespeare's Macbeth directed by Jyothish MG of Abhinaya Theatre Research Centre, Thiruvananthapuram. Abhija played the lead role of Lady Macbeth.
Saree Rosa	Devised and performed at International Theatre Festival, Kerala by La Patriotico Interesante, a street theatre production group from Chile
Automatarium	Directed by David Berga, Catalonia
Once Upon a Time	An English clown theatre production directed by Francoise Calvel from France
Pacha	A Malayalam theatre production directed by Surjith Gopinath of School of Drama & Fine Arts, Thrissur
Invisible Cities	A Malayalam adaptation of Italo Calvino's novel, directed by Firos Khan, National School of Drama
Tsunami Express	A multilingual production, in collaboration with Indian and Latin American artists, directed by Elias Cohen from Chile
Las Indias	A multilingual, multicultural community dance and music theatre project, directed by Elias Cohen from Chile
Karuna	A dance drama directed by veteran film maker Lenin Rajendran. Abhija portrayed the lead character of Vasavadatta in this adaptation of Kumaranasan's Karuna and performed extensively in Kerala

== Filmography ==
Year	Title	Role	Notes
2012	Bachelor Party	Uncredited	
2013	Last Puff	Shailaja	Short film
2013	Neelakasham Pachakadal Chuvanna Bhoomi	Paaru	
2013	Mazhayodoppam Mayunnathu	God	Short film Version
2014	Seconds	Thampi's wife	
2014	Njan Steve Lopez	Anjali	
2015	Love 24x7	Shweta Pillai	
2015	Lukka Chuppi	Renuka	
2015	Ozhivu Divasathe Kali	Maid	
2016	Mundrothuruth	Servant	
2016	School Bus	Servant	
2016	Action Hero Biju	Sindhu	
2017	Sakhisona	Heera Malini	Bengali Short film
2017	Udaharanam Sujatha	Thulasi	
2017	Catharsis	Sreeja	Short film
2018	Aabhaasam	Maoist	
2018	Kinar/Keni	ACP Uma Maheshwari	Tamil
2018	Murippadukal	Shantha	Short film Social awareness film by Department of Animal Husbandry, Govt. of Kerala
2019	Idam	Soumya	Screened at - PickurFlick Indie Film Festival 2020, India; South Film and Arts Academy Festival 2020, Chili; International Film Festival 2020, New Delhi; Festival Cinematografico de Mérida 2020, Mexico; Darbhanga International Film Festival 2020, India; New York Indian Film Festival 2019
2020	Error	Chinnu	Short film
2021	Confessions of a Cuckoo	Shobha Vincent	
2021	Sarcas Circa 2020		
2021	Krishnankutty Pani Thudangi	Tamil servant	
2022	Pada	CK Leela	
2022	Heaven	SP Revathi Subramaniam IPS	
2022	Bharatha Circus	SP Sarah Simon	
2023	Charles Enterprises	Parvatham	
2023	Neeraja	Chitra	
2023	Family	Jaya	
