= Anni (TV series) =

Indian Tamil-language soap opera

- Cover photo
- Also known as: Sister in law
- அண்ணி
- Genre: Soap opera Legal; Family; Drama
- Written by: K. Balachander
- Screenplay by: Thamira; Dialogue; K. Kannan
- Directed by: Episode Director Samuthirakani
- Starring: Malavika Avinash; Subhalekha Sudhakar; Sriman; Deepak Dinkar; Prem
- Theme music composer: Rajhesh Vaidhya
- Opening theme: "Oh Anni" by Nithyashree Mahadevan
- Country of origin: India
- Original language: Tamil
- No. of seasons: 1
- No. of episodes: 369

Production
- Producers: B. Kailasam; Geetha Kailasam
- Camera setup: Multi-camera
- Running time: approx. 20-22 minutes per episode
- Production company: Kavithalayaa Productions

Original release
- Network: Jaya TV; Jaya TV HD

Anni (Tamil: அண்ணி) (transl. Sister in law) is a 2001-2003 Tamil-language soap opera, starring Malavika Avinash, Subhalekha Sudhakar, Sriman, Deepak Dinkar, Prem and among others. Jaya TV and ran for 369 episodes. K. Balachander wrote the story and produced the show. The episodes were directed by Samuthirakani.

== Re-Telecast ==
Jaya TV started airing the repeat telecast of the show from 25 November 2019. It currently airs Monday to Friday at 8 pm IST

== Cast ==
- Malavika Avinash as Angayarkanni Muthaiya (Anni)
- Subhalekha Sudhakar as A. Ramanathan (Anni's father-in-law)
- Prem as Muthaiya (Anni's husband)
- Sriman as Nilakandan
- Deepak Dinkar as Babu (Muthaiya's second youngest brother)
- Soumya as Chitra Murali
- T. V. Varadarajan as Doctor
- Kuyili as Thenmozhi
- Revathi Sankaran as Kamala (Ramanathan's elder sister)
- V. S. Raghavan as Alavandan (Ramanathan's father)
- Santhoshi as Monika
- Kavithalaya Krishnan as Subbaiya (Bhaskar's uncle)
- Vaishnavi as Anjali
- M. Bhanumathi as Valliyammai (Anni's mother-in-law)
- Reena as Malathi Bhaskar(Ramanathan's second daughter)
- Ramachandran as Bhaskaran (Malathi's husband)
- Muthu Subramaniam as Angayarkanni's father
- Geetha as Saradha
- Rojashree as Radhika (Muthaiya's youngest sister)
- SSR Kannan as Murali (Muthaiya's younger brother)
- Kaushik as Hariharan (Radhika's love interest)
- - as - (Muthaiya's elder sister)
- - as Arjun (Muthaiya's nephew)
- Ranjitha as Ranjitha (Muthaiya's niece)
