= Megha Ramaswamy =

Indian filmmaker

- Born: Megha Ramaswamy; India
- Education: Film and Television Institute of India, Pune
- Occupations: Director, Screenwriter
- Website: Official Website

Megha Ramaswamy is a Mumbai-based screenwriter, director and producer. Having made her debut as a screenwriter in 2011, she transitioned into filmmaking with her directorial feature debut What Are The Odds, a Netflix film starring Abhay Deol, Karanvir Malhotra, Monica Dogra and Yashaswini Dayama.

Ramaswamy's body of work includes two other acclaimed short-films - the hybrid short documentary, Newborns, giving an inside look into the lives of acid-attack survivors, and Bunny, Ramaswamy's first fiction short film. Both films premiered at the Toronto International Film Festival and have traveled to several other film festivals, having been met with critical response and accolades. They've both also seen releases on the cinephile OTT service, MUBI.

Outside film, Ramaswamy co-hosts Cause Effect, a platform that produces cause related content and outreach programs. Her banner, Missfit Films, is dedicated to producing innovative films, which subscribe to being neither independent nor commercial.

Ramaswamy's latest mid-length film, Lalanna's Song (33 minutes), is a psychological horror project. The film stars Parvathy Thiruvothu, Rima Kallingal and Nakshatra Indrajith and had its world premiere at the Indian Film Festival of Los Angeles 2022 where it won Special Mention for Innovation and Pushing Boundaries.

Her next feature film Reshma Shera is a story about a little girl and her dog, and was last showcased at Berlinale Co-production Market, 2019.

== Filmography ==
- 2011 - Shaitan – Writer
- 2012 - Ship of Theseus – Actress (Journalist)
- 2014 - Newborns (Documentary short) – Writer and director
- 2015 - Bunny (Short) – Writer and director
- 2016 - The Last Music Store (Documentary short) – Writer and Director
- 2020 - What Are The Odds (Feature Film) – Writer and Director
- 2022 - Lalanna's Song (mid-length) - Writer and Director
