= 14th Santosham Film Awards =

2016 Tollywood Award ceremony

- Awarded for: Excellence in cinematic and music achievements
- Date: 14 August 2016
- Site: Hyderabad, India
- Hosted by: Sreemukhi; Nandhu; Vidyullekha Raman
- Produced by: Kondeti Suresh
- Organised by: Santosham Magazine

Highlights
- Most awards: Baahubali: The Beginning

Television coverage
- Channel: Zee Telugu

The 14th Santosham Film Awards (Note: Also referred to in the news media as the "Santhosham South Indian Awards 2016") was an awards ceremony held at Hyderabad, India on 14 August 2016. It recognized the best films and performances from the Tollywood films and music released in 2015, along with special honors for lifetime contributions and a few special awards. The awards are annually presented by Santosham Magazine.

== Honorary Awards ==
- Santosham Award for Completing 25 Years in Cinema – Malashri
- Santosham Allu Ramalingaiah Smarakam Award – Prudhvi Raj
- Santosham Akkineni Nageswara Rao Smarakam Award – Murali Mohan
- Santosham Daggubati Ramanaidu Smarakam Award – Editor Mohan

== Main Awards ==
=== Film ===
Award Category	Recipient	Film
Best Film	"Gunaa Team Works"	Rudhramadevi
Best Director	Koratala Siva	Srimanthudu
Best Producer	Shobu Yarlagadda, Prasad Devineni	Baahubali: The Beginning
Best Actor	Prabhas	Baahubali: The Beginning
Best Actress	Anushka Shetty	Rudhramadevi
Best Supporting Actor	Rajendra Prasad	Srimanthudu
Best Supporting Actress	Hema	Kumari 21F
Best Villain	Rana Daggubati	Baahubali: The Beginning
Best Editing	Kotagiri Venkateswara Rao	Baahubali: The Beginning, Srimanthudu
Best Choreographer	Prem Rakshith	Baahubali: The Beginning
Best Debut Director	Anil Ravipudi	Pataas
Best Debut Actor	Akhil Akkineni	Akhil
Best Debut Actress	Hebah Patel	Kumari 21F, Ala Ela

=== Music ===
Award Category	Recipient	Single/Album (film)
Best Music Director Award	Devi Sri Prasad	Srimanthudu, Kumari 21F
Best Female Playback Singer	Geetha Madhuri	"Jeeva Nadhi" from Baahubali: The Beginning
Best Lyricist Award	Sirivennela Seetharama Sastry	For whole album of Kanche

== Special awards ==
- Ever Green Beauty of India – Jaya Prada
- Special Jury Award for Best Actress – Hansika Motwani
- Special Jury Award for Best Actress – Pranitha Subhash
- Special Jury Award – Sivaji Raja
- Best New Face – Nikki Galrani
- Santosham Best Photographer Award – Tata Mallesh for Baahubali: The Beginning

== Presenters ==
Category	Presenter(s)
Santosham Akkineni Nageswara Rao Smarakam Award	Giri Babu
Best Director Award	Allu Aravind
Best Film Award	Dasari Narayana Rao Allu Aravind
Best Supporting Actress Award – Hansika Motwani	Dasari Narayana Rao Allu Aravind
Santosham Daggubati Ramanaidu Smarakam Award	Dasari Narayana Rao Allu Aravind
Best Music Director Award	Dasari Narayana Rao
Best Editing Award	Dasari Narayana Rao
Ever Green Beauty of India	Dasari Narayana Rao
Santosham Award for Completing 25 Years in Cinema	Dasari Narayana Rao
Special Jury Award for Best Actress – Pranitha Subhash	Allu Sirish
Best Debut Actress Award	Koratala Siva Devi Sri Prasad
Special Jury Award for Best Actress	Sudheer Babu Aadhi Pinisetty
Best New Face Award	Sudheer Babu Aadhi Pinisetty
Special Jury Award	Sudheer Babu Aadhi Pinisetty
Best Debut Director Award	Koratala Siva
Best Debut Actor Award	Murali Mohan Rajendra Prasad
Best Villain Award	Jaya Prada Gunasekhar
Santosham Allu Ramalingaiah Smarakam Award	Allu Aravind

== Performers ==
- Lavanya Tripathi
- Surbhi Puranik
- Hebah Patel
- Rashmi Gautam
