= 21st Santosham Film Awards =

2022 Tollywood award ceremony

- Awarded for: Excellence in cinematic and music achievements
- Presented on: 26 December 2022
- Date: 26 December 2022
- Site: JRC Convention, Hyderabad, India
- Hosted by: Suma Kanakala; Baladitya; Sudeepa Pinky; Rohini Reddy
- Produced by: Kondeti Suresh
- Organised by: Santosham Magazine

Highlights
- Lifetime achievement: P. Susheela

Television coverage
- Network: Gemini TV; Aha

The 21st Santosham Film Awards, officially known as Santosham South Indian Film Awards 2022, was an awards ceremony held at Hyderabad, India on 26 December 2022. The ceremony recognized the best films and performances from the Tollywood and other Indian language films and music released between 2021 and November 2022, along with special honors for lifetime contributions and a few special awards. The awards are annually presented by Santosham Magazine.

== Honorary awards ==
- Lifetime Achievement Award – P. Susheela
- Santosham Allu Ramalingaiah Smaraka Award – Rajendra Prasad
- Santosham NTR Smaraka Award – Krishnaveni, Vanisri, Latha, Roja Ramani, Prabha, Jayamalini, Kutty Padmini, Baby Rani, Kavitha,
- Santosham Krishnam Raju Smaraka Award – Murali Mohan
- Santosham Sirivennela Seetharama Sastry Smaraka Award – R. P. Patnaik

== Main awards ==
| Category | Recipient | Work |
|---|---|---|
| Best Film | Y. Ravi Shankar, Naveen Yerneni | Pushpa: The Rise |
| Best Director | Sukumar | Pushpa: The Rise |
| Best Actor | Allu Arjun (Note: Sukumar took the award.) | Pushpa: The Rise |
| Best Actor | Adivi Sesh | Major |
| Best Actress | Pooja Hegde (Note: Allu Aravind took the award.) | Most Eligible Bachelor, Radhe Shyam |
| Best Supporting Actor | Prakash Raj | Major |
| Best Villain | Srikanth | Akhanda |
| Best Music Director | Devi Sri Prasad | Pushpa: The Rise |
| Best Female Playback Singer | Mangli | "Saranga Dariya" from Love Story |
| Best Female Playback Singer | Indravathi Chauhan | "Oo Antava Oo Oo Antava" from Pushpa: The Rise |
| Best Lyricist | Chandrabose | Pushpa: The Rise |
| Best Lyricist | Suddala Ashok Teja | "Komuram Bheemudo" from RRR |
| Best Dialogue | Burra Sai Madhav | RRR |
| Best Choreography | Sekhar | Love Story |
| Best Cinematographer | Shamdat | Uppena |
| Best Cinematographer | Ram Prasad | Akhanda |
| Best Debut Director | Buchi Babu Sana | Uppena |
| Best Debut Director | Mallidi Vashist | Bimbisara |
| Best Debut Actor | Ashish Reddy | Rowdy Boys |
| Best Debut Music Director | Samarth Gollapudi | 7 Days 6 Nights |
| Best Director – Tamil | Brinda | Hey Sinamika |
| Best Actor – Tamil | Vasanth Ravi | Rocky |
| Best Actress – Tamil | Shraddha Srinath | Chakra and Maara |
| Best Supporting Actor – Tamil | Mahendran | Master |
| Best Supporting Actress – Tamil | Raveena Ravi | Rocky |
| Best Supporting Actress – Tamil | Raveena Ravi | Love Today |
| Best Debut Actor – Tamil | Pradeep Ranganathan | Love Today |
| Best Film – Kannada | Ravi Kumar | Rhymes |
| Best Film – Kannada | Soumya Santosh | Kapala |
| Best Director – Kannada | S. Mahesh Kumar | Madhagaja |
| Best Director – Kannada | Hari Santhosh | By Two Love |
| Best Actress – Kannada | Apporva | Krishna Talkies |
| Best Actress – Kannada | Sangeetha Sringeri | 777 Charlie, Lucky Man |
| Best Actress (Critics) – Kannada | Manvitha Kamath | Shiva 143 |
| Best Supporting Actor – Kannada | Shivaraj K. R. Pete | Dhamaka |
| Best Debut Actor – Kannada | Akshith Shashikumar | Oh My Love |
| Best Villain – Malayalam | Guru Somasundaram | Minnal Murali |
| Best Villain – Malayalam | Ajmal Ameer | |
| Best Debut Actor – Malayalam | Ranjith Sajeev | Mike |
| Best Actress – Malayalam | Vinitha Koshy | Paka |
| Best Director – Malayalam | Jeo Baby | The Great Indian Kitchen |
| Best Director – Malayalam | Vinayan (Note: Sudhakar Babu took the award.) | Pathonpatham Noottandu |

== Special awards ==
- Youth Icon of the year (Kannada) – Rajavardan

== Presenters ==
| Category | Presenter(s) |
|---|---|
| Santosham Allu Ramalingaiah Smarakam Award | Allu Aravind, Srikanth Reddy |
| Best Actress – Tamil | Allu Aravind, Srikanth Reddy |
| Best Director – Tamil | Allu Aravind, Srikanth Reddy |
| Santosham NTR Smaraka Award (Krishnaveni) | Nandamuri Ramakrishna, V. Vijayendra Prasad, V. Srinivas Rao |
| Best Supporting Actor | Nandamuri Ramakrishna, V. Vijayendra Prasad, V. Srinivas Rao |
| Santosham Krishnam Raju Smaraka Award | Talasani Srinivas Yadav, Syamaladevi |
| Santosham NTR Smaraka Award (Vanisri) | Talasani Srinivas Yadav, Syamaladevi |
| Santosham NTR Smaraka Award (Latha) | Murali Mohan |
| Santosham NTR Smaraka Award (Roja Ramani) | Murali Mohan |
| Santosham NTR Smaraka Award (Roja Prabha) | Murali Mohan |
| Santosham NTR Smaraka Award (Jayamalini) | Murali Mohan |
| Santosham NTR Smaraka Award (Kutty Padmini) | Murali Mohan |
| Santosham NTR Smaraka Award (Baby Rani) | Murali Mohan |
| Santosham NTR Smaraka Award (Kavitha) | Murali Mohan, Ambhika Krishna |
| Lifetime Achievement Award | Chiranjeevi |
| Best Debut Director | Chiranjeevi |
| Best Debut Actor – Tamil | Chiranjeevi |
| Best Actor (Adivi Sesh) | Chiranjeevi |
| Best Dialogue | Chiranjeevi |
| Best Choreography | Chiranjeevi |
| Best Debut Actor | Chiranjeevi |
| Best Lyricist (Suddala Ashok Teja) | Chiranjeevi |
| Best Female Playback Singer | Chiranjeevi |
| Best Actress | Murali Mohan |
| Best Debut Music Director | Murali Mohan |
| Best Villain – Malayalam (Guru Somasundaram) | Ambhika Krishna, Meher Ramesh, Anil Sunkara |
| Best Debut Actor – Malayalam | Ambhika Krishna, Meher Ramesh, Anil Sunkara |
| Best Actress – Malayalam | Ambhika Krishna, Meher Ramesh, Anil Sunkara |
| Best Director – Malayalam | Ambhika Krishna, Meher Ramesh, Anil Sunkara |
| Best Villain – Malayalam (Ajmal Ameer) | Ambhika Krishna, Meher Ramesh, Anil Sunkara |
| Best Supporting Actress – Tamil | Ambhika Krishna, Y. Kasi Viswanath, Madala Ravi |
| Best Actor – Tamil | Ambhika Krishna, Y. Kasi Viswanath, Madala Ravi |
| Best Supporting Actor – Tamil | Ambhika Krishna, Y. Kasi Viswanath, Madala Ravi |
| Best Cinematographer (Shamdat) | Ambhika Krishna, Y. Kasi Viswanath, Madala Ravi |
| Best Supporting Actor – Kannada | Babu Mohan, Y. Kasi Viswanath, Madala Ravi |
| Best Actress – Kannada | Babu Mohan, Y. Kasi Viswanath, Madala Ravi |
| Best Film – Kannada | Babu Mohan, Y. Kasi Viswanath, Madala Ravi |
| Best Director – Kannada | Babu Mohan, Y. Kasi Viswanath, Madala Ravi |
| Best Debut Director – Kannada | Babu Mohan, Y. Kasi Viswanath, Madala Ravi |
| Best Debut Actor – Kannada | Babu Mohan, Y. Kasi Viswanath, Madala Ravi |
| Youth Icon of the year (Kannada) | Babu Mohan, Y. Kasi Viswanath, Madala Ravi |
| Best Actress (Critics) – Kannada | Babu Mohan, Y. Kasi Viswanath, Madala Ravi |
| Santosham Sirivennela Seetharama Sastry Smaraka Award | Raja Chembolu, Sukumar |
| Best Cinematographer (Ram Prasad) | Devi Sri Prasad, Sukumar |
| Best Lyricist (Chandrabose) | Babu Mohan, Urvashi Rautela |
| Best Film | Babu Mohan |
| Best Music Director | Babu Mohan |
| Best Director | Babu Mohan |
| Best Actor (Allu Arjun) | Babu Mohan |

== Performers ==
| Name | Performance |
|---|---|
| Urvashi Rautela | Dance |
| R. P. Patnaik, Keerthana Srinivas | Singing |
| Warina Hussain | Dance |
| Kalpika Ganesh | Dance |
