= List of accolades received by Baahubali: The Beginning =

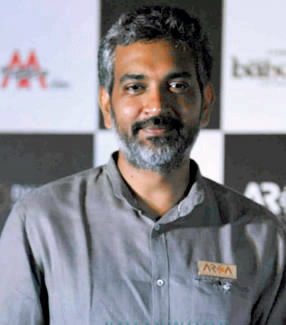
S. S. Rajamouli received several awards and nominations for directing the film.

Baahubali: The Beginning is a 2015 Indian epic historical fiction film written and directed by S. S. Rajamouli and produced by Arka Media Works. Shot simultaneously in Telugu and Tamil languages, the film stars Prabhas, Rana Daggubati, Anushka Shetty, and Tamannaah while Sathyaraj, Ramya Krishnan and Nassar appear in supporting roles. The soundtrack and music score was composed by M. M. Keeravani while K. K. Senthil Kumar provided the cinematography. Kotagiri Venkateswara Rao, Sabu Cyril and V. Srinivas Mohan were in charge of the film's editing, art direction and special effects respectively.

The first of two cinematic parts, The Beginning opened worldwide on 10 July 2015 to critical acclaim and record-breaking box-office success, becoming the highest-grossing film in India and the third-highest grossing Indian film worldwide, and the highest-grossing South Indian film. Grossing over ₹6.5 billion worldwide against a budget of ₹1.2 billion, the film became the first South Indian film, and the first non-Hindi film to gross over ₹1 billion in the dubbed Hindi version. The Beginning garnered several awards and nominations with praise for Rajamouli's direction, cinematography, production design, costumes and performances of the cast members.

At the 63rd National Film Awards, The Beginning won the Best Feature Film, becoming the first Telugu film to win the award, and Best Special Effects. At the 63rd Filmfare Awards South, the Telugu version won five awards from ten nominations, including Best Film, Best Director for Rajamouli and Best Supporting Actress for Krishnan. Both the Tamil and Telugu versions won several awards in their respective categories, including Best Picture, Best Direction for Rajamouli, and Best Performance In A Supporting Role (Female) for Krishnan at the 1st IIFA Utsavam. The Beginning became the first Indian film to be nominated for Saturn Awards, receiving five nominations at the 42nd ceremony, including Best Fantasy Film and Best Supporting Actress for Tamannaah.

== Accolades ==
Award	Date of Ceremony (Note: Date is linked to the article about the awards held that year, wherever possible.)	Category	Recipient(s) and nominee(s)	Result	Ref.
Ananda Vikatan Cinema Awards	7 January 2016	Best Supporting Actor	Sathyaraj	Won	
Ananda Vikatan Cinema Awards	7 January 2016	Best Supporting Actress	Ramya Krishnan	Won	
Ananda Vikatan Cinema Awards	7 January 2016	Best Visual Effects	V. Srinivas Mohan	Won	
Ananda Vikatan Cinema Awards	7 January 2016	Best Art Director	Sabu Cyril	Won	
Ananda Vikatan Cinema Awards	7 January 2016	Best Costume Designer	Rama Rajamouli, Prashanti Tipirneni	Won	
Ananda Vikatan Cinema Awards	7 January 2016	Best Makeup Artist	Senapathi Naidu, Nalla Srinu	Won	
Asian Film Awards	17 March 2016	Best Special Effects	V. Srinivas Mohan	Nominated	
CineMaa Awards	12 June 2016	Best Movie	Shobu Yarlagadda, Prasad Devineni	Won	
CineMaa Awards	12 June 2016	Best Director	S. S. Rajamouli	Won	
CineMaa Awards	12 June 2016	Best Music Director Jury	M. M. Keeravani	Won	
CineMaa Awards	12 June 2016	Best Art Director	Sabu Cyril	Won	
CineMaa Awards	12 June 2016	Best Supporting Actress	Ramya Krishnan	Won	
CineMaa Awards	12 June 2016	Best Actor in a Negative Role	Rana Daggubati	Won	
CineMaa Awards	12 June 2016	Best VFX	V. Srinivas Mohan	Won	
CineMaa Awards	12 June 2016	Best Editor	Kotagiri Venkateswara Rao	Won	
CineMaa Awards	12 June 2016	Best Cinematographer	K. K. Senthil Kumar	Won	
CineMaa Awards	12 June 2016	Best Choreographer	Prem Rakshith	Won	
CineMaa Awards	12 June 2016	Best Fight Master	Peter Hein	Won	
CineMaa Awards	12 June 2016	Best Singer Male	Karthik (for song "Pacchabottu")	Won	
CineMaa Awards	12 June 2016	Best Singer Female	Ramya Behra (for song "Dheevara")	Won	
Edison Awards	14 February 2016	Best Character Actress	Ramya Krishnan	Nominated	
Edison Awards	14 February 2016	Best Art Director	Sabu Cyril	Nominated	
Edison Awards	14 February 2016	Iconic Spellbinder	S. S. Rajamouli	Nominated	
FICCI Frames – BAF Awards	30 March 2016	VFX in a Motion Picture (International)	Shobu Yarlagadda, Prasad Devineni	Won	
FICCI Frames – BAF Awards	30 March 2016	VFX in a Motion Picture (India)	Shobu Yarlagadda, Prasad Devineni	Nominated	
FICCI Frames – BAF Awards	30 March 2016	VFX Shot of the Year	Shobu Yarlagadda, Prasad Devineni	Nominated	
Filmfare Awards South	18 June 2016	Best Film – Telugu	Shobu Yarlagadda, Prasad Devineni	Won	
Filmfare Awards South	18 June 2016	Best Director – Telugu	S. S. Rajamouli	Won	
Filmfare Awards South	18 June 2016	Best Actor – Telugu	Prabhas	Nominated	
Filmfare Awards South	18 June 2016	Best Actress – Telugu	Tamannaah	Nominated	
Filmfare Awards South	18 June 2016	Best Music Director – Telugu	M. M. Keeravani	Nominated	
Filmfare Awards South	18 June 2016	Best Supporting Actor – Telugu	Rana Daggubati	Nominated	
Filmfare Awards South	18 June 2016	Best Supporting Actor – Telugu	Sathyaraj	Nominated	
Filmfare Awards South	18 June 2016	Best Supporting Actress – Telugu	Ramya Krishnan	Won	
Filmfare Awards South	18 June 2016	Best Playback Singer Female – Telugu	Geetha Madhuri (for song "Jeevanadhi")	Won	
Filmfare Awards South	18 June 2016	Best Cinematographer	K. K. Senthil Kumar	Won	
IIFA Utsavam	24–25 January 2016	Best Picture – Telugu	Shobu Yarlagadda, Prasad Devineni	Won	
IIFA Utsavam	24–25 January 2016	Best Picture – Tamil	Shobu Yarlagadda, Prasad Devineni	Won	
IIFA Utsavam	24–25 January 2016	Best Director – Telugu	S. S. Rajamouli	Won	
IIFA Utsavam	24–25 January 2016	Best Direction – Tamil	S. S. Rajamouli	Nominated	
IIFA Utsavam	24–25 January 2016	Best Performance in a Lead Role (Male) – Tamil	Prabhas	Nominated	
IIFA Utsavam	24–25 January 2016	Best Performance in a Lead Role (Female) – Tamil	Tamannaah	Nominated	
IIFA Utsavam	24–25 January 2016	Best Performance in a Lead Role (Male) – Telugu	Prabhas	Nominated	
IIFA Utsavam	24–25 January 2016	Best Performance in a Lead Role (Female) – Telugu	Tamannaah	Nominated	
IIFA Utsavam	24–25 January 2016	Best Performance in a Supporting Role (Male) – Tamil	Sathyaraj	Won	
IIFA Utsavam	24–25 January 2016	Best Performance in a Supporting Role (Male) – Telugu	Sathyaraj	Nominated	
IIFA Utsavam	24–25 January 2016	Best Performance in a Supporting Role (Female) – Tamil	Ramya Krishnan	Won	
IIFA Utsavam	24–25 January 2016	Best Performance in a Supporting Role (Female) – Telugu	Ramya Krishnan	Won	
IIFA Utsavam	24–25 January 2016	Best Performance in a Negative Role – Tamil	Rana Daggubati	Nominated	
IIFA Utsavam	24–25 January 2016	Best Performance in a Negative Role – Telugu	Rana Daggubati	Won	
IIFA Utsavam	24–25 January 2016	Best Music Direction – Tamil	M. M. Keeravani	Nominated	
IIFA Utsavam	24–25 January 2016	Best Music Direction – Telugu	M. M. Keeravani	Nominated	
IIFA Utsavam	24–25 January 2016	Best Lyricist – Telugu	K Shiva Datta (for "Mamathala Thalli")	Nominated	
IIFA Utsavam	24–25 January 2016	Best Playback Singer (Male) – Tamil	Deepu (for song "Veerane")	Nominated	
IIFA Utsavam	24–25 January 2016	Best Playback Singer (Male) – Tamil	Haricharan (for song "Manohari")	Won	
IIFA Utsavam	24–25 January 2016	Best Playback Singer (Female) – Tamil	Geetha Madhuri (for song "Jeevanadhi")	Won	
IIFA Utsavam	24–25 January 2016	Best Playback Singer (Male) – Telugu	Revanth (for song "Manohari")	Nominated	
IIFA Utsavam	24–25 January 2016	Best Playback Singer (Male) – Telugu	Deepu (for song "Dheevara")	Nominated	
IIFA Utsavam	24–25 January 2016	Best Playback Singer (Female) – Telugu	Satya Yamini (for song "Mamathala Thalli")	Won	
IIFA Utsavam	24–25 January 2016	Best Playback Singer (Female) – Telugu	Geetha Madhuri (for song "Jeevanadhi")	Nominated	
IIFA Utsavam	24–25 January 2016	Best Playback Singer (Female) – Telugu	Damini (for song "Pachcha Bottesi")	Nominated	
IIFA Utsavam	24–25 January 2016	Best Production Design	Sabu Cyril	Won	
Nandi Awards	14 November 2017	Best Feature Film	Shobu Yarlagadda, Prasad Devineni	Won	
Nandi Awards	14 November 2017	Best Director	S. S. Rajamouli	Won	
Nandi Awards	14 November 2017	Best Supporting Actress	Ramya Krishnan	Won	
Nandi Awards	14 November 2017	Best Villain	Rana Daggubati	Won	
Nandi Awards	14 November 2017	Best Cinematographer	K. K. Senthil Kumar	Won	
Nandi Awards	14 November 2017	Best Art Director	Sabu Cyril	Won	
Nandi Awards	14 November 2017	Best Music Director	M. M. Keeravani	Won	
Nandi Awards	14 November 2017	Best Male Playback Singer	M. M. Keeravani	Won	
Nandi Awards	14 November 2017	Best Choreographer	Prem Rakshith	Won	
Nandi Awards	14 November 2017	Best Audiographer	P. M. Sateesh	Won	
Nandi Awards	14 November 2017	Best Costume Designer	Rama Rajamouli, Prashanti Tipirineni	Won	
Nandi Awards	14 November 2017	Best Fight Master	Peter Hein	Won	
Nandi Awards	14 November 2017	Best Special Effects	V. Srinivas Mohan	Won	
National Film Awards	3 May 2016	Best Feature Film	Shobu Yarlagadda, Prasad Devineni	Won	
National Film Awards	3 May 2016	Best Special Effects	V. Srinivas Mohan	Won	
Norway Tamil Film Festival Awards	28 April–1 May 2016	Best Lyricist	Madhan Karky (Note: Also for I.)	Won	
Producers Guild Film Awards	22 December 2015	President's Honour	Shobu Yarlagadda, Prasad Devineni	Won	
Saturn Awards	22 June 2016	Best Fantasy Film	Shobu Yarlagadda, Prasad Devineni	Nominated	
Saturn Awards	22 June 2016	Best Supporting Actress	Tamannaah	Nominated	
Saturn Awards	22 June 2016	Best Music	M. M. Keeravani	Nominated	
Saturn Awards	22 June 2016	Best Production Design	Sabu Cyril	Nominated	
Saturn Awards	22 June 2016	Best Costume Design	Rama Rajamouli, Prashanti Tipirneni	Nominated	
South Indian International Movie Awards	30 June–1 July 2016	Best Film (Telugu)	Shobu Yarlagadda, Prasad Devineni	Won	
South Indian International Movie Awards	30 June–1 July 2016	Best Director (Telugu)	S. S. Rajamouli	Won	
South Indian International Movie Awards	30 June–1 July 2016	Best Actor (Telugu)	Prabhas	Nominated	
South Indian International Movie Awards	30 June–1 July 2016	Best Cinematographer (Telugu)	K. K. Senthil Kumar	Won	
South Indian International Movie Awards	30 June–1 July 2016	Best Action Choreographer	Peter Hein	Won	
South Indian International Movie Awards	30 June–1 July 2016	Best Music Director (Telugu)	M. M. Keeravani	Nominated	
South Indian International Movie Awards	30 June–1 July 2016	Best Actor in a Negative Role (Telugu)	Rana Daggubati	Won	
South Indian International Movie Awards	30 June–1 July 2016	Best Supporting Actor (Telugu)	Sathyaraj	Nominated	
South Indian International Movie Awards	30 June–1 July 2016	Best Supporting Actress (Telugu)	Ramya Krishnan	Won	
South Indian International Movie Awards	30 June–1 July 2016	Best Lyricist (Telugu)	K. Shiva Datta	Nominated	
South Indian International Movie Awards	30 June–1 July 2016	Best Male Playback Singer (Telugu)	M. M. Keeravani (for song "Nippule Swasaga")	Nominated	
South Indian International Movie Awards	30 June–1 July 2016	Best Female Playback Singer (Telugu)	Satya Yamini (for song "Mamathala Thalli")	Won	
South Indian International Movie Awards	30 June–1 July 2016	Best Female Playback Singer (Telugu)	Ramya Behra (for song "Dheevara")	Nominated	
Santosham Film Awards	14 August 2016	Best Actor	Prabhas	Won	
Santosham Film Awards	14 August 2016	Best Producer	Shobu Yarlagadda, Prasad Devineni	Won	
Santosham Film Awards	14 August 2016	Best Villain	Rana Daggubati	Won	
Santosham Film Awards	14 August 2016	Best Editing	Kotagiri Venkateswara Rao	Won	
Santosham Film Awards	14 August 2016	Best Choreographer	Prem Rakshith	Won	
Santosham Film Awards	14 August 2016	Best Female Playback Singer	Geetha Madhuri (for song "Jeevanadhi")	Won	
Santosham Film Awards	14 August 2016	Best Photographer Award	Tata Mallesh	Won	

== See also ==
- List of Telugu films of 2015
- List of Tamil films of 2015
