= 22nd Santosham Film Awards =

2023 Tollywood award ceremony

- Awarded for: Excellence in cinematic and music achievements
- Date: 2 December 2023
- Hosted by: Suma Kanakala; Sravanthi Chokarapu
- Produced by: Kondeti Suresh
- Organised by: Santosham Magazine
- Official website: Dr Shyama Prasad Mukherjee Indoor Stadium, Panaji, India

Television coverage
- Network: Mahaa News; Mahaa Max

The 22nd Santosham Film Awards, officially known as Santosham South Indian Film Awards 2023, was an awards ceremony held at Panaji, India on 2 December 2023. The ceremony recognized the best films and performances from the Tollywood and other Indian language films released in 2023, along with special honors for lifetime contributions and a few special awards. The awards are annually presented by Santosham magazine.

== Honorary awards ==
- Santosham Allu Ramalingaiah Smaraka Award – Harsha Chemudu
- Santosham Akkineni Nageswara Rao Smaraka Award – Jayasudha

== Main awards ==
Category	Recipient	Work
Best Film	Venu Yeldandi	Balagam
Best Director	Gopichand Malineni	Veera Simha Reddy
Best Director	Sai Rajesh	Baby
Best Producer	Sreenivasa Kumar Naidu	Baby
Best Actor	Anand Deverakonda	Baby
Best Actress	Samyuktha	Virupaksha
Best Supporting Actor	Srikanth Iyengar	Bedurulanka 2012
Best Villain	Vishwak Sen	Das Ka Dhamki
Best Lyricist	Chandrabose	"Naatu Naatu" from RRR
Best Debut Director	Dandela Yelleshwara Rao	Love You Ram
Best Debut Actress	Vaishnavi Chaitanya	Baby
Best Child Actor	Allu Arha (Note: Allu Aravind took the award.)	Shaakuntalam
Best Cinematographer	Ram Prasad	Bhagavanth Kesari
Best Action	Ram Lakshman	Waltair Veerayya
Best Supporting Actress – Tamil	Saritha (Note: Murali Mohan took the award.)	Maaveeran
Best Debut Actress – Tamil	Malvika Sharma	Coffee with Kadhal
Best Film – Kannada	B. Suresha, Shylaja Nag	Kranti
Best Director – Kannada	Harsha	Vedha
Best Actress – Kannada	Shriya Saran	Kabzaa
Best Debut Director – Kannada	Nithin Krishnamurthy	Hostel Hudugaru Bekagiddare
Best Film – Malayalam	(Note: Bash Mohammed took the award.)	Jana Gana Mana
Best Director – Malayalam	Bash Mohammed	Ennalum Ente Aliya
Best Actor – Malayalam	Sreenath Bhasi	Sumesh and Ramesh
Best Actress – Malayalam	Gayatri Arun	Ennalum Ente Aliya
Best Supporting Actress – Malayalam	Merin Philip	Vaathil
Best Family Entertainer – Malayalam	Sanoop Thykoodam	Sumesh and Ramesh
Best Music Director – Malayalam	Ranjin Raj	Malikappuram
Best Writer – Malayalam	Sharis Mohammed	Jana Gana Mana

== Special awards ==
- Special Jury Award – Karthik Varma Dandu – Virupaksha

== Presenters ==
Category	Presenter(s)
Best Music Director – Malayalam	K. Atchi Reddy, S. V. Krishna Reddy
Best Family Entertainer – Malayalam	K. Atchi Reddy, S. V. Krishna Reddy
Best Director – Malayalam	Chota K. Naidu, Mallidi Vassishta
Best Actress – Malayalam	Chota K. Naidu, Mallidi Vassishta
Best Writer – Malayalam	Chota K. Naidu, Mallidi Vassishta
Best Film – Malayalam	Chota K. Naidu, Mallidi Vassishta
Best Supporting Actress – Malayalam	Gopichand Malineni, KL Damodar, Vamsi Krishna Marella
Best Action	Gopichand Malineni, KL Damodar, Vamsi Krishna Marella
Best Lyricist	Gopichand Malineni, KL Damodar, Vamsi Krishna Marella
Best Cinematographer	Gopichand Malineni, KL Damodar, Vamsi Krishna Marella
Best Actor – Malayalam	Allu Aravind
Best Director	Allu Aravind
Best Producer	Allu Aravind
Best Villain	Allu Aravind
Allu Ramalingaiah Smaraka Award	Allu Aravind
Santosham ANR Smaraka Award	Allu Aravind, Murali Mohan
Best Child Actor	Jayasudha
Best Supporting Actress – Tamil	Jayasudha
Best Debut Actress – Tamil	Bharat
Best Actress – Kannada	Bharat
Best Actress	Bharat
Special Jury Award	Bharat
Best Supporting Actor	Karthik Varma Dandu, Samyuktha
Best Debut Actress	Ambika Krishna, Murali Mohan
Best Actor	Ambika Krishna, Murali Mohan
Best Debut Director	Ambika Krishna, Ramesh Aravind, Sapthami Gowda
Best Director – Kannada	Ambika Krishna, Ramesh Aravind, Sapthami Gowda
Best Film – Kannada	Ambika Krishna, Ramesh Aravind, Sapthami Gowda
Best Debut Director – Kannada	Ramesh Aravind, Viranika Shettty

== Performers ==
Name	Performance
Dimple Hayathi	Dance
Yashwanth Kumar Master	Dance
