= Geetha Arts =

Indian motion picture company

- Type: Private
- Industry: Entertainment
- Founded: 1972; 54 years ago in Hyderabad, India
- Headquarters: Hyderabad, Telangana, India
- Key people: Allu Aravind; Allu Arjun; Allu Venkatesh; Allu Sirish
- Products: Films
- Owner: Allu Aravind
- Subsidiaries: GA2 Pictures; GAP Live TV & Movies
- Website: geethaarts.com

Geetha Arts is an Indian film production and distribution company known for its works in Telugu cinema. It is one of the largest and most successful production houses in South Indian cinema. It was established in 1972 by Allu Aravind. It has produced around 60 films majority of them in Telugu in addition to a few films in Hindi, Tamil, and Kannada languages.

Geetha Arts marked its beginning through the 1974 Telugu film Bantrothu Bharya. The company has produced films featuring actors such as Chiranjeevi, Rajinikanth, Aamir Khan, Pawan Kalyan, Ram Charan, Allu Arjun, Ganesh, Nani, Ravichandran, Govinda and Kartik Aaryan. It has also expanded its presence into film distribution, exhibition and digital content.

== History ==
Geetha Arts is an Indian film production and distribution company established in 1972 by Dasari Satyanaraya Murthy, Vegi Veera Raju and Allu Aravind, the son of veteran Telugu comedian Allu Ramalingaiah. The company was named after the Hindu philosophical text Bhagavad Geeta which inspired Allu Aravind. It is formerly known as Geetha Art Productions, Geetha Cine Enterprises, Geetha Creative Arts.

== Online streaming service ==
Allu Aravind in association with MyHome Group owner Rameswar Rao Jupally started an OTT service named Aha which went live on February 8, 2020.

== Film production ==
Key
†	Denotes films that have not yet been released

=== Geetha Arts ===
Year	Title	Language	Director	Notes	Ref(s).
1974	Bantrothu Bharya	Telugu	Dasari Narayana Rao	Produced as Geetha Art Productions	
1975	Devude Digivaste	Telugu	Dasari Narayana Rao	Produced as Geetha Art Productions	
1979	Maavullo Mahasivudu	Telugu	Raja Chandra	Produced as Geetha Cine Enterprises	
1982	Yamakinkarudu	Telugu	Raj Bharat	Produced as Geetha Creative Arts	
1984	Hero	Telugu	Vijaya Bapineedu		
1985	Vijetha	Telugu	A. Kodandarami Reddy		
1987	Aradhana	Telugu	Bharathiraja		
1987	Pasivadi Pranam	Telugu	A. Kodandarami Reddy		
1989	Attaku Yamudu Ammayiki Mogudu	Telugu	A. Kodandarami Reddy		
1989	Mappillai	Tamil	Rajasekhar		
1990	Pratibandh	Hindi	Ravi Raja Pinisetty		
1993	Mechanic Alludu	Telugu	B. Gopal		
1994	The Gentleman	Hindi	Mahesh Bhatt		
1996	Akkada Ammayi Ikkada Abbayi	Telugu	E. V. V. Satyanarayana		
1997	Master	Telugu	Suresh Krissna		
1998	Mangalyam Tantunanena	Kannada	V. S Reddy		
2000	Kunwara	Hindi	David Dhawan		
2001	Daddy	Telugu	Suresh Krissna		
2002	Kya Yehi Pyaar Hai	Hindi	K. Muralimohana Rao		
2003	Johnny	Telugu	Pawan Kalyan		
2005	Andarivaadu	Telugu	Srinu Vaitla		
2006	Happy	Telugu	A. Karunakaran		
2008	Jalsa	Telugu	Trivikram Srinivas	Santosham Best Film Award	
2008	Ghajini	Hindi	AR Murugadoss		
2009	Magadheera	Telugu	S.S. Rajamouli	National Film Award for Best Special Effects; Nandi Award for Best Popular Feature Film; Filmfare Award for Best Film – Telugu; Co-produced with B. V. S. N. Prasad	
2011	100% Love	Telugu	Sukumar		
2011	Badrinaath	Telugu	V. V. Vinayak		
2014	Kotha Janta	Telugu	Maruthi		
2014	Pilla Nuvvu Leni Jeevitham	Telugu	A.S. Ravi Kumar Chowdary	Co-produced with Sri Venkateswara Creations	
2015	Darling	Tamil	Sam Anton		
2016	Sarrainodu	Telugu	Boyapati Srinu	Co-produced with Shanam Naga Ashok Kumar	
2016	Srirastu Subhamastu	Telugu	Parasuram		
2016	Dhruva	Telugu	Surender Reddy	Co-produced with N. V. Prasad	
2020	Ala Vaikunthapurramuloo	Telugu	Trivikram Srinivas	Co-produced with Haarika and Hassine Creations	
2025	Thandel	Telugu	Chandoo Mondeti		
2025	Single	Telugu	Caarthick Raju	Co-production with Kalya Films	
2025	The Girlfriend	Telugu	Rahul Ravindran	Co-production with Dheeraj Mogilineni Entertainment	
2026	Aakasamlo Oka Tara	Telugu	Pavan Sadineni	Co-production with Swapna Cinema and Lightbox Media	
TBA	M. S - A On-screen Legacy †	Telugu	Gowtam Tinnanuri	Co-production with Rockline Entertainments and Bunny Vas Works	

=== Prashanthi Creations (Sastry and Aravind) ===
Year	Film	Language	Director	Ref(s).
1982	Subhalekha	Telugu	K. Viswanath	
1983	Shubh Kaamna	Hindi	K. Viswanath	

=== Sri Sai Ram Arts (Venkateswara Rao and Aravind) ===
Year	Film	Language	Director	Ref(s).
1991	Rowdy Alludu	Telugu	K. Raghavendra Rao	
2000	Annayya	Telugu	Muthyala Subbaiah	

=== Sai Charan Combines (Reddy, Udeshi and Aravind) ===
Year	Film	Language	Director	Ref(s).
1994	S. P. Parasuram	Telugu	Ravi Raja Pinisetty	

=== Sri Raghavendra Movie Corporation and United Producers (Dutt, Raghavendra Rao and Aravind) ===
Year	Film	Language	Director	Ref(s).
1996	Pelli Sandadi	Telugu	K. Raghavendra Rao	
1997	Mere Sapno Ki Rani	Hindi	K. Raghavendra Rao	
1998	Paradesi	Telugu	K. Raghavendra Rao	
1998	Ninaithen Vandhai	Tamil	K. Selva Bharathy	
2003	Gangotri	Telugu	K. Raghavendra Rao	

=== Kshitij Production Combines (Udeshi and Aravind) ===
Year	Film	Language	Director	Ref(s).
1999	Kaun?	Hindi	Ram Gopal Varma	

=== Siri Media Arts (Dutt and Aravind) ===
Year	Film	Language	Director	Ref(s).
2003	Pellam Oorelithe	Telugu	S. V. Krishna Reddy	
2003	Calcutta Mail	Hindi	Sudhir Mishra	
2004	Intlo Srimathi Veedhilo Kumari	Telugu	K. Vasu	

=== Siri Venkateswara Productions (Satyanarayana Reddy and Aravind) ===
Year	Film	Language	Director	Ref(s).
2005	Bunny	Telugu	V. V. Vinayak	

=== GA2 Pictures (Vasu and Aravind) ===
GA2 Pictures is the indie production arm of Geetha Arts, on which they produce small and medium-budgeted films, managed by Bunny Vas.

Year	Film	Language	Director	Cast	Notes	Ref(s).
2015	Bhale Bhale Magadivoy	Telugu	Maruthi	Nani, Lavanya Tripathi	Co-production with UV Creations	
2016	Sundaranga Jaana	Kannada	Ramesh Aravind	Ganesh, Shanvi Srivastava	Co-production with Rockline Entertainments	
2018	Geetha Govindam	Telugu	Parasuram	Vijay Devarakonda, Rashmika Mandanna		
2018	Taxiwaala	Telugu	Rahul Sankrityan	Vijay Deverakonda, Priyanka Jawalkar, Malavika Nair	Co-production with UV Creations	
2019	Prati Roju Pandage	Telugu	Maruthi	Sai Dharam Tej, Rashi Khanna	Co-production with UV Creations	
2021	Chaavu Kaburu Challaga	Telugu	Koushik Pegallapati	Kartikeya Gummakonda, Lavanya Tripathi		
2021	Most Eligible Bachelor	Telugu	Bhaskar	Akhil Akkineni, Pooja Hegde		
2022	Pakka Commercial	Telugu	Maruthi	Gopichand, Raashi Khanna	Co-production with UV Creations	
2022	Urvasivo Rakshasivo	Telugu	Rakesh Shashii	Allu Sirish, Anu Emmanuel	Co-production with Shri Tirumala Production Pvt. Ltd	
2022	18 Pages	Telugu	Palnati Surya Pratap	Nikhil Siddharth, Anupama Parameswaran	Co-production with Sukumar Writings	
2023	Vinaro Bhagyamu Vishnu Katha	Telugu	Murali Kishor Abburu	Kiran Abbavaram, Kashmira Pardesi		
2023	Kotabommali PS	Telugu	Teja Marni	Srikanth, Rahul Vijay, Shivani Rajasekhar		
2024	Ambajipeta Marriage Band	Telugu	Dhushyanth Katikaneni	Suhas		
2024	Aay	Telugu	Anji K. Maniputhra	Narne Nithin		

=== V4 Movies (GA2 Pictures and Studio Green) ===
Year	Film	Language	Director	Ref(s).
2017	Next Nuvve	Telugu	Prabhakar Podakandla	

=== Allu Bobby Company (Bobby and Aravind) ===
Year	Film	Language	Director	Ref(s).
2022	Ghani	Telugu	Kiran Korrapati	

=== Allu Entertainment ===
Year	Film	Language	Director	Notes	Ref(s).
2022	Jersey	Hindi	Gowtham Tinnanuri	Co-produced with Dil Raju Productions, Sithara Entertainments & Brat Films	
2023	Shehzada	Hindi	Rohit Dhawan	Co-produced with Haarika & Haasini Creations, T-Series & Brat Films	
2023	Three Of Us	Hindi	Avinash Arun	Co-produced with Matchbox Pictures	

== Film distribution ==
=== Geetha Film Distributors ===
Geetha Film Distributors (GFD), a subsidiary of Geetha Arts has released over 300 Telugu, Hindi and English films in Andhra Pradesh.

- Pasivadi Pranam (1987)
- Jebu Donga (1987)
- Rudraveena (1988)
- Yamudiki Mogudu (1988)
- Khaidi No. 786 (1988)
- Trinetrudu (1988)
- Attaku Yamudu Ammayiki Mogudu (1989)
- Kodama Simham (1990)
- Raja Vikramarka (1990)
- Stuartpuram Police Station (1991)
- Gang Leader (1991)
- Rowdy Alludu (1991)
- Mechanic Alludu (1993)
- Big Boss (1995)
- Pelli Sandadi (1996)
- Paradesi (1998)
- Bavagaru Bagunnara? (1998)
- Tholi Prema (1998)
- Iddaru Mitrulu (1999)
- Annayya (2000)
- Johnny (2003)
- Andarivaadu (2005)
- Happy (2006)
- Stalin (2006)
- Desamuduru (2006)
- Jalsa (2008)
- Parugu (2008)
- Ghajini (2008)
- Magadheera (2009)
- Leader (2010)
- Komaram Puli (2010)
- Khaleja (2010)
- Cameraman Gangatho Rambabu (2012)
- Yevadu (2014)
- Bhadram Be Careful Brotheru (2016)
- Paper Boy (2018)
- Kurukshetram (2019, dubbed version)
- Nuvvu Thopu Raa (2019)
- Mamangam (2019, dubbed version)
- Zombie Reddy (2021)
- Naane Varuvean (2022, dubbed version)
- Kantara (2022, dubbed version)
- Malikappuram (2023, dubbed version)
- Vinaro Bhagyamu Vishnu Katha (2023)
- UI (2024, dubbed version)
- Chhaava (2025, dubbed version)
- Mahavatar Narsimha (2025, dubbed version)
- Kantara: Chapter 1 (2025, dubbed version)
