= 15th Santosham Film Awards =

2017 Tollywood award ceremony

- Awarded for: Excellence in cinematic and music achievements
- Date: 12 August 2017
- Site: Hyderabad, India
- Hosted by: Anchor Ravi
- Produced by: Kondeti Suresh
- Organised by: Santosham Magazine

Highlights
- Lifetime achievement: Roja Ramani
- Most awards: Sarrainodu

Television coverage
- Channel: Zee Telugu; TV9

The 15th Santosham Film Awards (Note: Also referred to in the news media as the "Santhosham South Indian Awards 2017") was an awards ceremony held at Hyderabad, India on 12 August 2017. It recognized the best films and performances from the Tollywood films and music released in 2016, along with special honors for lifetime contributions and a few special awards. The awards are annually presented by Santosham Magazine.

== Honorary Awards ==
- Santosham Lifetime Achievement Award – Roja Ramani
- Santosham Dasari Smarakam Award (Producer) – Allu Aravind
- Santosham Dasari Smarakam Award (Actor) – Murali Mohan
- Santosham Dasari Smarakam Award (Writer) – Paruchuri brothers
- Santosham Dasari Smarakam Award (Film Journalism) – Pasupuleti Ramaravu
- Santosham Allu Ramalingaiah Smarakam Award – Saptagiri

== Main Awards ==
=== Film ===
Award Category	Recipient	Film
Best Film	'Big Ben Cinemas'	Pelli Choopulu
Best Director	Boyapati Srinu	Sarrainodu
Best Producer	Raj Kandukari	Pelli Choopulu
Best Actor	Naga Chaitanya	Premam
Best Actress	Samantha Akkineni	A Aa
Best Supporting Actor	Srikanth	Sarrainodu
Best Villain	Aadhi Pinisetty	Sarrainodu
Best Female Comedian	Vidyullekha Raman	Sarrainodu
Best Debut Director	Tharun Bhascker	Pelli Choopulu
Best Debut Actor	Meka Roshan	Nirmala Convent

=== Music ===
Award Category	Recipient	Single/Album (film)
Best Male Playback Singer	Armaan Malik	

== Special awards ==
- Critic's Choice Best Debut Director – Bellamkonda Ramakrishna Reddy for Drushyam
- Special Jury Award for Best Actress – Mannara Chopra for Thikka
- Best Film Journalist – Bhaagyalakshmi (Andhra Jyothi)
- Best Video Journalist – Karunakar (Gemini TV)

== Presenters ==
Category	Presenter(s)
Best Actor Award	Allu Aravind Boyapati Srinu
Best Actress Award	Allu Aravind Boyapati Srinu
Santosham Lifetime Achievement Award	Talasani Srinivas Yadav Bharathi Vishnuvardhan
Best Director Award	Talasani Srinivas Yadav
Santosham Dasarii Smarakam Award (Producer)	Talasani Srinivas Yadav
Best Film Award	Boyapati Srinu
Best Producer Award	Boyapati Srinu
Santosham Dasari Smarakam Award (Actor)	Ganta Srinivasa Rao
Santosham Dasari Smarakam Award (Writer)	Ganta Srinivasa Rao
Special Jury Award for Best Actress – Mannara Chopra	Ganta Srinivasa Rao
Best Female Comedian Award	Naga Chaitanya
Best Debut Actor Award	Naga Chaitanya
Best Male Playback Singer Award	Naga Chaitanya
Best Villain Award	Murali Mohan Ganta Srinivasa Rao
Santosham Dasari Smarakam Award (Film Journalism)	Murali Mohan Ganta Srinivasa Rao
Santosham Allu Ramalingaiah Smarakam Award	Allu Aravind

== Performers ==
- Anasuya Bharadwaj
- Mannara Chopra
- Richa Panai
