= Santosham Film Awards =

Tollywood award ceremony

Santosham Film Awards, currently known as Santosham South Indian Film Awards are one of the most popular awards given for Tollywood films and Telugu Music Artistes.

== Background ==
The awards first began in 2004 by the annual Santosham magazine which was started in 2003. The awards felicitate all of the technicians and actors for their contribution to Tollywood and Telugu Music Industry.

=== Popular awards ===
- Best Film
- Best Director
- Best Producer
- Best Actor
- Best Actress
- Best Supporting Actor
- Best Supporting Actress
- Best Villain
- Best Debut Director
- Best Debut Actor
- Best Debut Actress
- Best Young Performers
- Best Comedian
- Best Music Director
- Best Character Actor
- Best Lyricist
- Best Male Playback Singer
- Best Female Playback Singer

=== Technical Awards ===
- Best Art Direction
- Best Action
- Best Cinematographer
- Best Editing
- Best Choreography
- Best Story
- Best Screenplay
- Best Dialogue
- Best Sound Recording

== Ceremonies ==
- 22nd Santosham Film Awards
- 21st Santosham Film Awards
- 20th Santosham Film Awards (replaced 18th and 19th ceremonies)
- 17th Santosham Film Awards
- 16th Santosham Film Awards
- 15th Santosham Film Awards
- 14th Santosham Film Awards
