= Jalsa (2008 film) =

2008 Indian film by Trivikram Srinivas

- Poster
- Directed by: Trivikram Srinivas
- Written by: Trivikram Srinivas
- Produced by: Allu Aravind
- Starring: Pawan Kalyan; Ileana; Parvati Melton; Kamalinee Mukerji
- Cinematography: K. V. Guhan; Rasool Ellore
- Edited by: A. Sreekar Prasad
- Music by: Devi Sri Prasad
- Distributed by: Geetha Arts
- Release date: 1 April 2008
- Running time: 167 minutes
- Country: India
- Language: Telugu

Jalsa (transl. Fun) is a 2008 Indian Telugu-language action comedy film written and directed by Trivikram Srinivas and produced by Allu Aravind under the Geetha Arts banner. The film stars Pawan Kalyan, Ileana, Parvati Melton and Kamalinee Mukherjee, with Mukesh Rishi, Prakash Raj, Brahmanandam, Ali, and Sunil in supporting roles. The soundtrack of the film was composed by Devi Sri Prasad.

Released on 1 April 2008, Jalsa set multiple box office records on its opening day, registering the highest first-day collection in Telugu cinema history at the time and the highest for any South Indian film in a single state. It emerged as the highest-grossing Telugu film of the year and was a commercial success. The film received praise for its lead performances, music, humour, and witty dialogues, though the screenplay drew criticism.

The film's marketing included an action video game based on its characters, making it the first movie-based video game in South Indian and Telugu cinema. Due to its enduring popularity, Jalsa was re-released in 2022, becoming the highest-grossing Telugu re-release until it was surpassed by Kushi (2001), another Pawan Kalyan film.

== Plot ==
Sanjay "Sanju" Sahu, a post-graduate working as an aerobics instructor, is in love with Indu. When Indu introduces him to her father Rammohan, a police officer and a past acquaintance of Sanju, he refuses to approve of their relationship, forcing Indu into an arranged marriage. Sometime later, Indu's younger sister Bhagyamathi "Bhagi" and her friend Jyothsna "Jo" are rescued from a group of hoodlums by Sanju. Unaware of each other's feelings, both women fall in love with him. After Sanju rejects Jo's proposal, Bhagi woos him with the help of her friend Seenu, going as far as moving into Sanju's house as a tenant. Despite a brief fallout, Sanju reciprocates Bhagi's feelings and the two begin dating.

Meanwhile, Damodar Reddy, a ruthless land grabber operating from prison, targets Sanju for disrupting his illegal land deals and thrashing his younger son. When Damodar's henchmen attempt to assassinate Sanju and take his friend Abhi hostage, Sanju rescues Abhi. Questioned by his friends regarding his violent capabilities and the struggles they would have to face later, Sanju reveals his traumatic past describing what real struggles are and also reveals that he was a naxalite.

Past: Sanju loses his brother to terminal illness and financial difficulties drives his parents to suicide. A grieving Sanju pulls out a stone pillar, provoking Damodar's henchmen. After fighting them off, Sanju flees into the forest and joins the Naxalites. Years later, a reformed Sanju assists a police team led by Rammohan in eliminating his cadre in an encounter, subsequently undergoing government rehabilitation as a college student in Hyderabad.

Present: When Bhagi informs her father of her desire to marry Sanju, Rammohan opposes the union, exposing Sanju's past as an ex-naxalite and Indu's former lover. Heartbroken, Bhagi agrees to marry a person of her father's choice, Raghuram. Sanju soon discovers that Raghuram is Damodar's elder son and that Damodar is using the alliance to consolidate power. Confronting Damodar in prison, Sanju challenges the syndicate, kidnaps Damodar's younger son, and launches a direct assault on the gang. Sanju overpowers Damodar Reddy, sparing his life to prove that true victory lies in subduing the enemy rather than slaughtering them. Sanju reunites with Bhagi and they get married. Months later, a paralysed Damodar suffers a fatal heart attack upon spotting Sanju passing by.

== Cast ==
- Pawan Kalyan as Sanjay 'Sanju' Sahu
- Ileana as Bhagyamathi 'Bhagi', Indu's younger sister, Jyo's friend and Sanju's love interest (dubbed by Swathi Reddy)
- Parvati Melton as Jyothsna 'Jyo', Bhagi's Friend and Sanju's one-sided lover
- Kamalinee Mukerji as Indu, Bhagi's elder sister and Sanju's former love interest
- Mukesh Rishi as Damodar Reddy
- Prakash Raj as Rammohan Reddy, Indu and Bhagyamati's father
- Brahmanandam as Head Constable Pranav
- Ali as Abhi, Sanju's friend
- Sunil as Seenu
- Tanikella Bharani as Bulli Reddy
- Sivaji as Raghuram Reddy, Damodar Reddy's elder son
- Aditya Redij as Damodar Reddy's younger son
- Kamal Kamaraju as Indu's husband
- Makarand Deshpande as a naxalite
- Abhimanyu Singh as Durga
- Shishir Sharma as Janardhan Sahu, Sanju's father
- Dharmavarapu Subramanyam as Doctor
- Mallikarjuna Rao as Minister
- Bianca Desai as Bhagyamathi's friend
- Ravi Varma as a naxalite
- Krishnudu as Damodar Reddy's aide
- Uttej as Sanju's friend
- Satyam Rajesh as College student
- Bharath Reddy
- Mahesh Babu as Sekhar (voiceover)

== Soundtrack ==
The film's soundtrack, composed by Devi Sri Prasad, was released on 29 February 2008, with Aditya Music acquiring the audio rights for ₹90 lakh, the highest for a Telugu film at the time. The album received widespread critical acclaim and was well received by audiences. It topped music charts for several months after its release. Devi Sri Prasad won the 2008 Santosham Best Music Director Award for his composition.

In addition to strong physical and digital sales, the film’s music generated significant revenue from mobile ringtone downloads, contributing approximately ₹1.45 crore, marking a notable expansion of the Telugu music market.

Jalsa

Soundtrack album by Devi Sri Prasad
- Released: 2 April 2008
- Recorded: 2008
- Genre: Film soundtrack
- Length: 36:24
- Label: Aditya Music
- Producer: Devi Sri Prasad

Devi Sri Prasad chronology
Tulasi (2007)	Jalsa (2008)	Santosh Subramaniam (2008)

Track-List
No.	Title	Lyrics	Singer(s)	Length
1.	"Jalsa"	Sirivennela Seetharama Sastry	Baba Sehgal, Rita	4:19
2.	"My Heart is Beating"	Sirivennela Seetharama Sastry	K. K.	4:59
3.	"You and I"	Sirivennela Seetharama Sastry	Devi Sri Prasad	5:00
4.	"Chalore Chalore Chal"	Sirivennela Seetharama Sastry	Ranjith	2:46
5.	"Jennifer Lopez"	Ramajogayya Sastry	Benny Dayal, Priya	4:19
6.	"Gaallo Thelinattunde"	Ramajogayya Sastry	Tippu, Gopika Poornima	4:52
7.	"Chalore Chalore Chal (Hindi)" (Bonus track)	Raqueeb Alam	Devi Sri Prasad	3:05
8.	"My Heart is Beating (Remix)" (Remix)	Sirivennela Seetharama Sastry	K. K.	3:02
9.	"Jalsa (The Devi Mix)" (Remix of title song)	Sirivennela Seetharama Sastry	Baba Sehgal, Devi Sri Prasad	4:02
Total length:				36:24

== Marketing ==
As part of its marketing campaign, Jalsa became the first Telugu and South Indian film to have an official video game. The game was launched at a function held at Hotel Novotel in Hyderabad on 22 March 2008. The online version was developed by RZ2 Games (Chris Whaley), while FX Labs (Sashi Reddy – Aplabs) developed the mobile version. The online game was available for free, whereas the mobile game was priced at ₹50 per download. It was made available across 42 Big C outlets in Andhra Pradesh.

== Release ==
=== Theatrical ===
Jalsa was released on 1 April 2008 in theatres worldwide. The film was originally scheduled to be released on 27 March 2008, but because of delays in the digital intermediate (DI) process. Jalsa was later released with 400 prints in 800 theatres worldwide across 1000 screens.

=== Remastered re-release ===
Jalsa was re-released in theatres worldwide on 3 September 2022, coinciding with Kalyan's birthday, with remastered picture and sound. Jalsa grossed over ₹3.25 crore in its 2022 re-release and became the highest grossing Telugu re-release of all time until surpassed by another Pawan Kalyan film Kushi. The collections of the special shows were reported to be donated to charity.

== Awards and nominations ==
Ceremony	Category	Nominee	Result	Ref(s)
56th Filmfare Awards South	Best Film – Telugu	Allu Aravind	Nominated	
56th Filmfare Awards South	Best Director – Telugu	Trivikram Srinivas	Nominated	
56th Filmfare Awards South	Best Actor – Telugu	Pawan Kalyan	Nominated	
56th Filmfare Awards South	Best Actress – Telugu	Parvati Melton	Nominated	
56th Filmfare Awards South	Best Supporting Actress – Telugu	Ileana D'Cruz	Nominated	
56th Filmfare Awards South	Best Music Director – Telugu	Devi Sri Prasad	Nominated	
56th Filmfare Awards South	Best Lyricist – Telugu	Sirivennela Seetharama Sastry - (Chalore Chalore)	Nominated	
Santosham Film Awards	Best Film – Telugu	Jalsa	Won	
Santosham Film Awards	Best Director – Telugu	Trivikram Srinivas	Won	
Santosham Film Awards	Best Actor – Telugu	Pawan Kalyan	Nominated	
Santosham Film Awards	Best Actress – Telugu	Ileana D'Cruz	Won	
Santosham Film Awards	Best Supporting Actor – Telugu	Prakash Raj	Nominated	
Santosham Film Awards	Best Supporting actress – Telugu	Parvati Melton	Nominated	
Santosham Film Awards	Best Misic Director – Telugu	Devi Sri Prasad	Won	
