= Sarrainodu =

2016 Indian film by Boyapati Srinu

- Theatrical release poster
- Directed by: Boyapati Srinu
- Written by: Story & Screenplay: Boyapati Srinu; Dialogues: M. Rathnam
- Produced by: Allu Aravind
- Starring: Allu Arjun; Aadhi Pinisetty; Rakul Preet Singh; Catherine Tresa; Meka Srikanth; Priyadarshi Pulikonda
- Cinematography: Rishi Punjabi
- Edited by: Kotagiri Venkateshwara Rao
- Music by: S. Thaman
- Production company: Geetha Arts
- Release date: 22 April 2016
- Running time: 160 minutes
- Country: India
- Language: Telugu
- Budget: ₹50 crore
- Box office: est. ₹127.6 crore

Sarrainodu (transl. The right man) is a 2016 Indian Telugu-language action comedy film directed by Boyapati Srinu and produced by Allu Aravind under Geetha Arts. The film stars Allu Arjun, alongside Aadhi Pinisetty, Rakul Preet Singh, Catherine Tresa, Srikanth, Rajitha, P. Sai Kumar, Jayaprakash, Pradeep Rawat, Suman and Adarsh Balakrishna. The music was composed by S. Thaman, while the cinematography and editing were handled by Rishi Punjabi and Kotagiri Venkateshwara Rao.

Sarrainodu was released on 22 April 2016 to positive reviews from critics and became the 2nd highest grossing Telugu film of 2016, grossing over ₹127.60 crore at the box office. It was subsequently dubbed into Malayalam as Yodhavu and was released in Kerala a month after the original version. The core plot was reported to be loosely based on the 2004 film Walking Tall.

== Plot ==
Gana, an ex-Indian Army Major, is raised by his paternal uncle Sripathi and is berated by his father Umapathi for leaving the army and not having an aim in life. Gana is sent to a neighboring village to meet his prospective bride Mahalakshmi Jaanu, the daughter of Umapathi's friend Jaya Prakash, an ex-IAS officer. However, Gana meets MLA Hansitha Reddy and falls for her. Gana tells an imaginary story to Umapathi that Jaanu rejected him due to his involvement in fights.

Meanwhile, Vairam Dhanush, the son of Chief Minister Reddy, meets Paddam Veerendra, a spoilt brat. Veerendra and his rich father seeks Dhanush's help as Veerendra assaulted and killed a girl in a drug overdose. The girl's parents seek Hansitha's help when they file the petition in the court. Due to the lack of evidence and the embarrassment faced in the court, the girl's parents commit suicide. An enraged Gana thrashes Dhanush's lawyer Govindaraju and chops Veerendra's legs, which enrages Dhanush. After learning about his actions, Hansitha falls for Gana and promises to marry him if he swears in the presence of God that he will not indulge in violence. When Gana is about to take the oath at the temple, a badly injured Jaanu arrives, running from Dhanush's henchmen who are trying to kill her. Gana thrashes the thugs and protects Jaanu. At Gana's house, Jaanu reveals that she did not reject Gana.

Past: Gana had arrived at Jaanu's village and had saved her from Obul Reddy, Dhanush's henchmen, and later declined the marriage. Jaanu explains that Dhanush had tried to blackmail Jaya Prakash as he had been protecting farmers so that they would not have to sell their lands for the laying down of oil pipelines. This incident infuriated Dhanush, who killed the farmers, but Jaanu intervened and insulted Dhanush. Dhanush killed Jaya Prakash and tried to kill Jaanu, but she narrowly escaped and was in search of Gana for days.

Present: After learning this, Gana goes to Dhanush's house, where he battles with his henchmen and tries to burn Dhanush alive, but Dhanush escapes. Gana is questioned for the attack, but claims that other people had thrashed Dhanush. Eventually, Obul Reddy reveals the truth about the atrocities that Dhanush had committed in the village, and the media is thrown into an uproar. Dhanush arrives at DGP Mallikarjun's office to surrender but ends up shooting Mallikarjun and tries to kill Umapati, but Sripati takes the bullet and is left for dead. Reddy stops Dhanush from shooting anyone and tells Umapati to call Gana and make him surrender to Dhanush. Gana arrives and is told that Sripati will be saved if he surrenders, Gana does so and is stabbed by Dhanush and his men. Umapathi tells Reddy that if Sripathi is dead, then Reddy and Dhanush will be dead. Reddy tells Dhanush to kill Sripati and an enraged Gana kills Reddy's bodyguards and assassinates Reddy. Gana fights Dhanush and decapitates him with an axe. Later, Gana and Mallikarjun tell a cover story to the media that Reddy and Dhanush were killed while trying to protect Mallikarjun from unknown terrorists. Gana announces Hansitha as a new candidate to become the new CM.

== Cast ==
- Allu Arjun as Gana / Ganapati
- Aadhi Pinisetty as Vairam Dhanush
- Srikanth as Sripathi, Gana's uncle
- Rakul Preet Singh as Mahalakshmi / Janu
- P. Sai Kumar as Jaya Prakash 'JP', Janu's father
- Jayaprakash as Umapati 'UP', Gana's father
- Catherine Tresa as MLA Hansitha Reddy
- Brahmanandam as Linga Hariharan, Umapati's neighbor
- Pradeep Rawat as Obul Reddy (Voice dubbed by P. Ravi Shankar)
- Suman as DGP Mallikarjun
- Kitty as CM Reddy, Dhanush's father
- Vijayakumar as Pedhayya
- Vinaya Prasad as Lakshmi, Gana's mother
- Aadarsh Balakrishna as Paddam Veerendra
- Devadarshini as Gayatri, Sripati's wife
- Annapoorna as Arunamma, Gana's grandmother
- Vidyullekha Raman as Tamizhselvi, Gana's sister-in-law
- Surekha Vani as Padma
- Rajeev Kanakala as Lawyer Govindaraju
- Jaya Prakash Reddy as Bhoopathi
- Bharath Reddy as Bharath
- Sameer Hasan as a lawyer
- Mukul Dev as Saketh (Voice dubbed by Vedala Hemachandra)
- L. B. Sriram as Ramudu, the victim's father
- Supreeth as Dhanush's henchmen
- Prabhakar as Dhanush's henchmen
- Shravan as Ranga, Dhanush's henchman
- Prudhviraj as Obul Reddy's henchman
- Anshuman Sahoo as Balangir Baba
- Bharath Raju as Aden Reddy, Obul Reddy's henchman
- Priyadarshi as Prakash
- Satya Prakash
- Chalapathi Rao as Naidu
- Geetha Singh as Seetha
- G. V. Sudhakar Naidu as Ramaswamy
- Rahul Verma
- Rajitha as Sirisha
- Bhiraj Nath as ram
- Anjali in the song "Blockbuster" (cameo appearance)

== Production ==
Boyapati Srinu wrote the script with Allu Arjun in mind for the lead role. He wanted to cast Samantha Ruth Prabhu who acted with Allu Arjun in S/O Satyamurthy, but it did not happen. Rakul Preet Singh was cast in the leading role and Catherine Tresa in a supporting role. It is Rakul Preet Singh's first collaboration with Allu Arjun and Catherine Tresa's third collaboration with Allu Arjun after Iddarammayilatho and Rudhramadevi. Aadhi Pinisetty was chosen as the main antagonist, while Srikanth, P. Sai Kumar, Suman and Jayaprakash were chosen for important roles. Priyamani, Anushka Shetty and Disha Patani were reported to have been approached for a cameo appearance in a song, but it was Anjali who made an appearance.

== Soundtrack ==
The film score and soundtrack album were composed by S. Thaman. This is Thaman's second collaboration with Allu Arjun after Race Gurram. Lahari Music acquired the audio rights of the film for an undisclosed price and it was announced that the audio launch event will take place on 20 March 2016, but it was pushed to April, since the audio launch of Sardar Gabbar Singh took place on the same day. The makers later announced that there will be no audio launch for this film and it was also announced that the album will hit the stores directly on 2 April 2016. The film features six songs with lyrics by Sri Mani, Ramajogayya Sastry, Anantha Sriram, Krishna Chaitanya and Bunny Suresh.

=== Critical response ===
The album received positive reviews from critics. The Times of India wrote "The album is peppered with hits and is sure to do well." The album was well received by audiences, and it has been trending on top in Apple Music as well as on radio charts. The audio success meet was held on 10 April 2016 at RK Beach in Vishakapatnam, with Chiranjeevi attending the event as chief guest. The song "Blockbuster" was well received and it was later reused as "Vera Level" in Tamil film Ayogya, which is a Tamil remake of Temper.

== Release ==
The filmmakers aimed for a Sankranthi release, but the release date was postponed due to delay in principal photography. The film was scheduled to release on 8 April 2016 coinciding with Allu Arjun's birthday, but it was postponed again due to post-production delays. The film was released worldwide on 22 April 2016.

The film was later dubbed in Hindi under the same title and released on YouTube by Goldmines Telefilms on 28 May 2017.

== Reception ==
=== Critical response ===
Sarrainodu received mixed-to-positive reviews from critics with praise for Arjun and Aadhi's performances, action sequences, cinematography and music, but criticized its script and characterizations.

Pranita Jonnalagedda of The Times of India gave 3/5 stars and wrote "The film has nothing new to narrate and fails to keep you glued to the seats throughout. The hackneyed plot and lack of novelty make this film a regular watch, this film is something for the masses." Sangeetha Devi Dundoo of The Hindu wrote "‘Sarrainodu’ engages in parts and Allu Arjun is its saving grace." Suresh Kavirayani of Deccan Chronicle felt that the film's core plot is reported to have been inspired by the 2004 film Walking Tall.

== Accolades ==
=== 64th Filmfare Awards South ===
- Best Actor – Allu Arjun – Nominated
- Best Music Director – S. S. Thaman – Nominated
- Best Male Playback Singer – Dhanunjay – "You Are My MLA" – Nominated
- Critics Best Actor – Telugu– Allu Arjun – Won
- Best Female Playback Singer – Shreya Ghoshal- "Blockbuster" – Nominated

=== 6th South Indian International Movie Awards ===
- Best Supporting Actor (Telugu) – Srikanth - Won
- Best Actor (Telugu)-Allu Arjun - Nominated
- Best Actor in a Negative Role (Telugu) - Aadhi Pinisetty - Nominated

=== 15th Santosham Film Awards ===
- Best Director – Boyapati Srinu - Won
- Best Supporting Actor – Srikanth - Won
- Best Villain – Aadhi Pinisetty -Won
- Best Female Comedian – Vidyullekha -Won
