= Srimanthudu =

2015 Indian film by Koratala Siva

- Theatrical release poster
- Directed by: Koratala Siva
- Written by: Koratala Siva
- Produced by: Naveen Yerneni; Yalamanchili Ravi Shankar; Mohan Cherukuri (CVM)
- Starring: Mahesh Babu; Shruti Haasan; Jagapathi Babu; Rajendra Prasad
- Cinematography: R. Madhi
- Edited by: Kotagiri Venkateswara Rao
- Music by: Devi Sri Prasad
- Production companies: G. Mahesh Babu Entertainment; Mythri Movie Makers
- Distributed by: Eros International
- Release date: 7 August 2015
- Running time: 158 minutes
- Country: India
- Language: Telugu
- Budget: ₹60–70 crore (Note: Deccan Chronicle estimates the film's budget to be ₹60 crore. Indo-Asian News Service estimates the film's budget to be ₹70 crore.)

Srimanthudu (transl. Wealthy Man) is a 2015 Indian Telugu-language action drama film written and directed by Koratala Siva. The film is produced by Mythri Movie Makers and G. Mahesh Babu Entertainment. The film stars Mahesh Babu, Shruti Haasan, Jagapati Babu and Rajendra Prasad. Sampath Raj, Mukesh Rishi, Sukanya and Harish Uthaman appear in supporting roles. It was distributed globally by Eros International.

The film tells the story of Harsha Vardhan (Mahesh Babu), a young man who inherits a business empire from his father Ravikanth (played by Jagapati Babu). Urged by his friend Charuseela (Haasan) to learn about his and his father's ancestral roots in a remote village named Devarakota, Harsha adopts the village and spends some time trying to improve the standard of living of the local people and the infrastructure of the village. His efforts anger the local crime boss Sashi (played by Sampath Raj) and his brother Venkata Ratnam, a politician (played by Mukesh Rishi).

Srimanthudu was initially going to be produced by UTV Motion Pictures, but the company backed out, citing differences with Siva. In addition to directing the film, Siva also wrote the screenplay. Devi Sri Prasad composed the score, and R. Madhi was the cinematographer. Kotagiri Venkateswara Rao edited the film. Production began on 11 August 2014 at Ramanaidu Studios in Hyderabad. Principal photography began on 7 November 2014 in Pune, and lasted till mid-June 2015. Though most of the film was shot in and around Hyderabad, a few portions were filmed in Tamil Nadu and Malaysia.

The film opened to positive critical reception and was a commercial success. After the film's release, many actors, bureaucrats and politicians announced plans to develop the backward villages and encouraged the adoption of villages in Andhra Pradesh and Telangana. The film went onto win three Nandi Awards including Best Popular Feature Film and three Filmfare Awards South including Best Telugu Actor for Mahesh Babu. It also won the state Gaddar Award for Third Best Feature Film. The film's Tamil dubbed version, titled Selvandhan, were released simultaneously worldwide on 7 August 2015 in around 2500 screens.

== Plot ==
Harsha Vardhan is the sole heir of his father Ravikanth's business empire worth ₹25,000 crore. After he meets Charuseela at his friend Apparao's birthday party, he enrolls in a university course on rural development. Charuseela wants to use technology for the benefit of Devarakota, a remote village in Uttarandhra from which she hails. A friendship blossoms between them, and they gradually become attracted to each other. The natural resources of Devarakota are being exploited by Sashi, the brother of Central minister Venkata Ratnam, whose tyranny has made many locals migrate to the city to seek a better life. Nevertheless, the village head Narayana Rao hopes that the standard of living will soon improve along with the general condition of the village. Meanwhile, Ratnam's son Radha uses blackmail to threaten harm to Ravikanth's family if he does not back out of a prestigious highway contract. Ravikanth's nephew Karthik, who hopes to succeed Ravikanth in the business empire, leaks to Radha details about an upcoming bid for the contract, which comes to the notice of Harsha. After subtly warning Ratnam at his residence in Delhi, Harsha secretly makes a lower bid on behalf of his father's company and wins the contract.

When Charuseela learns that Harsha is Ravikanth's son, she starts avoiding him. When he asks the reason, she says that Ravikanth is a native of Devarakota who left for Hyderabad to earn wealth unlike her father Narayana Rao, who stayed back and strived for improving the conditions at their village. After asking his father for a long holiday before joining his business, Harsha travels to Devarakota without his father's knowledge. In Devarakota he meets Rao and introduces himself as a student pursuing a course in rural development who has come to study the village. After learning more about Devarakota and Sashi's tyranny, Harsha announces that he will adopt the village and develop it. While he works to improve conditions in the village, Ratnam asks Sashi also to develop the village, partly to win in the upcoming elections, but he remains silent regarding his intention to gain credit for doing so. At the same time, Harsha learns from Rao that, as a young man, Ravikanth wishing, as Harsha does now, to see the village developed, had established a dairy farm for the local welfare. After the farm was set up, Ratnam and Sashi set it on fire, causing many deaths and Ravikanth was blamed for the fire, Insulted, and arrested. He walked out of the village, moved to the city, and went on to acquire much wealth.

Charuseela returns to Devarakota and assumes that Harsha is trying to impress her family with the intention of marrying her. Initially livid, Charuseela is impressed when Harsha succeeds in persuading her uncle's family not to migrate to the city to live with their employed son and instead makes their son agree to visit them every possible weekend. Later, Harsha and Charuseela learn that Ratnam is going to take over all the agricultural land around the village for political gain since the value of the land will appreciate following the official declaration of a new coastal industrial corridor. Harsha confronts them and warns them not to interfere in his work of developing the village. Harsha later visits a water bottling unit which not only produces alcoholic beverages but also draws from the village's source of drinking water. He tries to close it, but is attacked by Sashi's henchmen and is hospitalised. Ravikanth, who has been informed of Harsha's adoption of Devarakota, manages to bring Harsha back to Hyderabad, where he joins the office after he recovers. Ravikanth later confronts a visibly upset Harsha and decides to send him back to Devarakota, earning Harsha's love for which he has long yearned. Harsha hands over the reigns of the business empire to Karthik and leaves. At Devarakota, Harsha kills Ratnam and Sashi at the factory and construes it as an accident due to an inadvertent short circuit, similar to what Sashi had done before Ravikanth's arrest years before. The film ends with Ravikanth and his family visiting Rao's house on Sankranthi, where Harsha, now Charuseela's husband, receives them warmly.

== Cast ==
- Mahesh Babu as Harsha Vardhan
- Shruti Haasan as Charuseela
- Jagapathi Babu as Ravikanth
- Rajendra Prasad as Narayana Rao
- Anand as Meghana's father
- Rahul Ravindran as Karthik
- Ali as Rajaratnam
- Sivaji Raja as Suryam
- Subbaraju as Ravikanth's brother
- Mukesh Rishi as Venkata Ratnam
- Sampath Raj as Sashi
- Vennela Kishore as Apparao
- Harish Uthaman as Radha
- Sravan Raghavendra as Radha's sidekick
- Surya as Madhav Rao, Ravikanth's accountant
- Kadambari Kiran as villager
- Sriram Edida as Narayana Rao's brother
- Ravi Varma as Charuseela's cousin
- Thagubothu Ramesh
- A. R. C. Babu
- Pruthvi
- Tulasi as Narayana Rao's sister-in-law
- Sukanya as Harsha Vardhan's mother
- Sithara as Charuseela's mother
- Shanoor Sana as Karthik's mother
- Surekha Vani as Sumathi
- Rajitha as Apparao's mother
- Poorna in a cameo appearance in the song "Rama Rama"
- Angana Roy as Harsha's cousin
- Nikkita Anil Kumar as Harsha's sister
- Sanam Shetty as Meghana
- Ravi Prakash as Dr. Ganesh
- Tejaswi Madivada as Venkata Ratnam's daughter
- Chatrapathi Sekhar as TV Reporter
- Appaji Ambarisha Darbha as head of board of directors
- Rajashree as Venkata Ratnam's wife
- Ramajogayya Sastry in a cameo appearance in the song "Rama Rama"

== Production ==
=== Development ===
UTV Motion Pictures announced in October 2013 that they would produce a film starring Mahesh Babu and directed by Koratala Siva, marking their maiden Telugu production with Mahesh's sister Manjula Ghattamaneni and presenting the film under the banner Indira Productions. A possible delay was expected as Mahesh had earlier agreed to work on a film directed by Raj Nidimoru and Krishna D.K., produced by Ashwini Dutt, after completing Aagadu (2014). In late March 2014, G. Dhananjayan of UTV Motion Pictures announced that the film's production would commence in July 2014. UTV Motion Pictures backed out of the film citing differences with Siva, and the overseas distribution company Mythri Movie Makers agreed to become the major investor in the film.

Mahesh opted to co-produce the film under the banner G. Mahesh Babu Entertainment Pvt. Ltd to control the film's budget, accepting a share in the profits in lieu of his remuneration. Devi Sri Prasad was signed to compose the film's music. R. Madhi, the film's cinematographer, charged ₹1.4 crore as his remuneration. The official launch ceremony was held on 11 August 2014 at Ramanaidu Studios in Hyderabad. Mahesh participated in the story discussions with Siva and shared his ideas for improving the script. Srimanthudu was confirmed as the film's title on 29 May 2015, after registering it in December 2014.

=== Casting ===
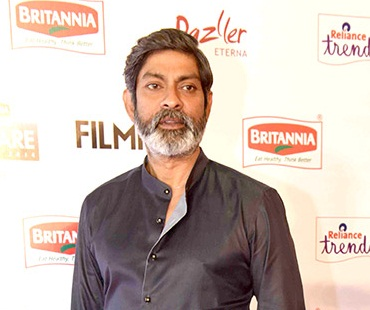
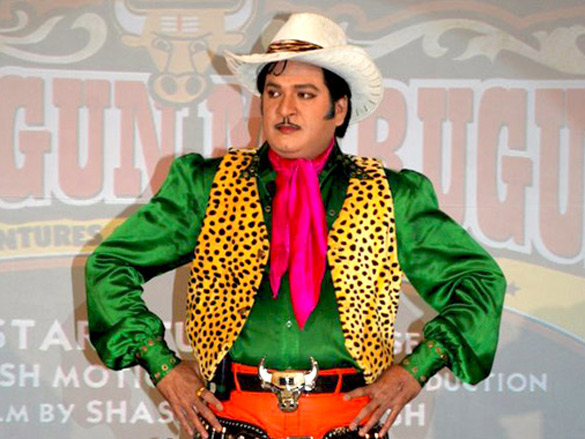
Impressed with his work in Legend (2014), Siva chose Jagapati Babu (top) to play Mahesh's father in the film. Rajendra Prasad (bottom) was chosen to play Haasan's father in the film.

Mahesh played the role of a billionaire's son in the film. For his character's appearance, he chose a casual look replete with cardigans, jackets and scarves. He sported various hair styles, including a layered look, a messy hair-do, and a conservative cut, for various episodes in the film. Shruti Haasan was selected as the heroine of the film; the role was supposed to be her first on-screen appearance with Mahesh though she had appeared in an item number in Aagadu after signing this film. She charged a remuneration of ₹1.25 crore, which was the highest she had received in her career until then. Haasan said that she would play a "strong, independent, intelligent" and simple girl in the film, adding that the romance between the lead pair would be a "very calm, relaxed and classy" one. Siva chose the name Charuseela for the female lead character after going through the lyrics during the recording of the song of the same name.

Impressed with his work in Legend (2014), Siva chose Jagapati Babu to play the role of Harsha's father in the film. After considering Nadhiya and Gracy Singh for the role of Mahesh's mother, Sukanya was selected in January 2015. Rajendra Prasad, Sampath Raj, Brahmanandam and Tulasi were announced for the supporting roles. While Sampath Raj played the antagonist, Brahmanandam's inclusion was never confirmed. Harish Uthaman was signed to play one of the antagonists in the film. Uthaman told Indo-Asian News Service that a few scenes required numerous takes due to his difficulties with the language and called Mahesh considerate to have helped him.

Rahul Ravindran made a small yet important cameo appearance. After considering actresses proficient in classical dance for performing a peppy dance number set in a rural backdrop, Poorna was selected as she was a trained Kathak dancer. After auditioning seventy actresses, Angana Roy was selected to play an "important part" in the film, marking her debut in Telugu cinema. Sanam Shetty was signed after one of the unit members of her unreleased Telugu debut Intinta Annamayya convinced the film-makers to consider her. Malayali actress Nikkita Anil Kumar played the role of Mahesh's sister in the film, and Vaishnav, a teenager who played the role of her cousin, helped the non-Telugu actors with their lines. Tejaswi Madivada, who earlier worked with Mahesh in Seethamma Vakitlo Sirimalle Chettu (2013), was signed to play a politician's daughter.

=== Filming ===
Principal photography commenced on 7 November 2014 at Pune, and Haasan joined the set on the next day. The two leads were mobbed by local people during the film's shoot at an IT hub in Pune. The next segment took place in Hyderabad at a private studio where a song was filmed with Mahesh and Haasan. The song that accompanies Mahesh's first appearance in the film was filmed at Ramoji Film City starting on 11 December 2014. The third filming segment commenced on 28 December 2014 at Hyderabad. Around the end of January 2015, it was estimated that the film's shooting would be wrapped up in a month.

A song on Mahesh and Haasan was shot in a set erected at Annapurna 7 Acres Studios. Another filming segment commenced at Madurai, where Haasan and Kishore rejoined the film's sets. Shooting then moved to Karaikudi. An action sequence on Mahesh and others was filmed at Pollachi in February 2015. A song choreographed by Bosco-Caesar was filmed with Mahesh and Haasan. This marked the first Telugu film of Bosco-Caesar. The filming continued at Palani until 3 March 2015, after which a few scenes focusing on Mahesh, Roy, and others were shot at Hyderabad.

In April 2015, the next filming schedule began in Malaysia. Upon its completion, Mahesh took a break and then joined the set at Hyderabad on 6 May 2015. On 5 June 2015, Madhi said in an interview that twelve days of shooting were pending. He added that two types of camera – the Alexa XT and the Red Dragon – were being used to film a number of mild movement shots throughout the film. On 17 June 2015, Siva told the media that all filming except for a week of patchwork was finished. By then, a song sequence focusing on the lead pair was being filmed at Ramoji Film City.

== Soundtrack ==
Devi Sri Prasad composed the film's soundtrack which consists of six songs; the lyrics were written by Ramajogayya Sastry except for "Charuseela" which was co-written by Prasad. Aditya Music marketed the film's soundtrack. Compared to other songs, Sastry took more time to complete the lyrics of the song "Jaago". Siva explained the situation to Sastry during the film's shoot at Karaikudi and at Ramoji Film City, and Sastry took input from him. Prasad composed it in the indie rock genre. Haasan revealed that "Charuseela" was based on her character in the film and that the tune had been inspired by one of Michael Jackson's compositions.

The soundtrack of the original and dubbed Tamil versions were released on 18 July 2015 and 4 August 2015, respectively.

== Release ==
In December 2014, the producers announced a May 2015 release. Due to technical issues, the film's release was postponed to 17 July 2015. The film's release was postponed to 7 August 2015 after a personal request by Shobu Yarlagadda, the producer of Baahubali: The Beginning to do so.Srimanthudu was dubbed into Tamil as Selvandhan, which was released simultaneously along with the original on 7 August 2015.

Srimanthudu was released in 2500 screens worldwide. While the Central Board of Film Certification passed the film in India with a 'U/A' certificate without any cuts, the British Board of Film Classification rated it '12A' and suggested a compulsory removal of a four-second long visual of rooster fighting as per the Cinematograph Films (Animals) Act 1937. It was also released in Santiago, the capital of Chile, thus becoming the first Indian film to be screened in a Latin American country.

=== Distribution ===
Classic Entertainments acquired the overseas distribution rights of the film in late February 2015, for an amount of ₹81 million, which was the highest price that any Telugu film had commanded in the overseas market until then. By the second week of June 2015, distribution rights for most of the regions were sold out while negotiations for a few were ongoing. Global Cinemas, Aditya films, and Vintage creations acquired the distribution rights of the Nizam, West and East Godavari regions for ₹14.5 crore, ₹3.25 crore, and ₹3.43 crore respectively.

At the same time, 14 Reels Entertainment and Devi films were in talks with the makers for the rights of Krishna and Ceded regions, respectively while 'S' Creations was expected to acquire the Guntur region rights for an amount of ₹4—4.25 crore. However, a press release on 19 June 2015 stated that Abhishek Pictures had acquired the theatrical distribution rights of the Nizam region. The film's global theatrical rights were sold for a total of ₹59.6 crore. The theatrical rights of Andhra Pradesh, Karnataka, and the rest of India were sold for ₹21 crore, ₹6 crore, and ₹2 crore respectively. Eros International acquired the film's worldwide distribution rights on 5 August 2015.

=== Marketing ===
The first look poster featured Mahesh riding a Cannondale Scalpel 29 Carbon 3 bike costing approximately ₹3.5 lakh. The first look teaser of 60 seconds was released on 31 May 2015. The second poster featuring Mahesh was released on 14 July 2015. Another poster featuring Mahesh was released on 24 July 2015. Close-Up entered into a co-branding partnership with this film in late July 2015. A cycling rally was held on 16 August 2015 at Gachibowli, Hyderabad, where Mahesh met 2,500 cyclists as a part of the film's promotion.

Close-Up announced a "Closeup Srimanthudu Meet Mahesh Babu Contest", where Mahesh's fans were asked to give a missed call to 1800-266-2444 to enter the contest which was open from 1 August 2015 to 4 September 2015. The makers announced the auction of the cycle used by Mahesh in the film, with interested people being directed to bid for the cycle at www.iamsrimanthudu.com by donating ₹999. Whilst the remaining donors received a special T-shirt, G. Nageswara Reddy from Karimnagar district was announced as the winner of the cycle by the film's unit in mid-November 2015.

=== Home media ===
The global television broadcast rights were sold to Zee Telugu in late May 2015 for a high but undisclosed price, estimated to be around ₹12 crore.Srimanthudu had its global television premiere on 8 November 2015 at 6:00 pm IST. It registered a TRP rating of 21.24, the third-highest rating ever for a Telugu film after Magadheera (2009) and Baahubali: The Beginning (which registered TRP ratings of 22.00 and 21.84, respectively).

== Reception ==
=== Critical reception ===
Srimanthudu received positive reviews from critics. Sangeetha Devi Dundoo of The Hindu called Srimanthudu a "star-driven film with a strong plot that's worth a watch". Dundoo further stated, "This isn't Ashutosh Gowariker's Swades, where Shah Rukh Khan finds his true calling in a much more realistic manner. The social consciousness comes coated with commercially viable ingredients and still, makes for an engaging watch". Sify called Srimanthudu a "right mix of Mahesh's emotional and class performance, Shruthi's charisma, fine storyline and all materials that are needed for a good entertainer". The reviewer appreciated Siva for not writing a separate comedy track to distract from the story. Karthik Pasupulate of The Times of India rated the film 3.5 out of 5 and wrote, "You could say this movie is Mahesh Babu's Swades (the 2004 SRK film) albeit a little dumbed down. Or a Mirchi (the Prabhas film) rehashed. Yet there can be no denying that Srimanthudu achieves more than any big ticket Tollywood potboiler has in more in that last decade [sic], for the simple reason that it is a drama made like one." Sethumadhavan N of the Bangalore Mirror rated the film 3.5 out of 5 and wrote, "Make no mistake, Srimanthudu is certainly a big commercial entertainer and has most of the elements needed for the same. But to deliver a total commercial which doesn't have a great plot and yet remaining engaging all the way isn't easy at all. That is where the writing by Siva emerges triumphant." Suresh Kavirayani of Deccan Chronicle rated the film 3.5 out of 5 and wrote, "Though there are a few hiccups, Srimanthudu is a good emotional drama with excellent performance by Mahesh Babu, supported by good content with neat dialogues". Hemanth Kumar C. R. of Outlook India rated the film 3.5 out of 5 and stated, "In an industry where weaving a story to suit the image of an A-list star is common, Mahesh Babu's latest, Srimanthudu, takes a different course. The film might lack a big-starrer firepower, but by letting go of such conventions, what we get in the end is a sensible film full of heart and humanity."

Karthik Keramalu of IBNLive rated the film 3 out of 5 stars and stated "All in all, Srimanthudu is a notch above the so-so model of commercial films. It'd have been neater had the gap between the intent and the content of the film narrowed down further". Kirubhakar Purushothaman of India Today rated the film 2.5 out of 5 and wrote, "There are many cliches throughout the story, but still Srimanthudu manages to hold your attention. Though Srimanthudu has failed to serve anything new, he is rich and complete. When the film ends, everyone in the film is happy. As are Mahesh Babu's fans." Suhas Yellapuntala of The New Indian Express wrote, "The director showcases power, greed, corruption as well as regression, hope and agony, in equal measure. However, while Mahesh Babu effortlessly sails through the movie, Srimanthudu is clichéd, unimaginative and stretched beyond its potential". He added, "Srimanthudu would have made for much better viewing if it had been cut shorter by about half an hour. At the end of it, watching the film becomes an endurance rather than an experience".

=== Box office ===
==== Global ====
Registering an occupancy of 200% across the globe on its first day, Srimanthudu collected approximately a distributor share of 200cr at the AP/Nizam box office and 50cr from Karnataka, Tamil Nadu, the rest of India and overseas markets, taking its first day global total share to 350cr. With this, it managed to break the records set by Attarintiki Daredi (2013) and S/O Satyamurthy (2015) and became the second-highest Telugu film opener of the year. Trade analyst Trinath told Indo-Asian News Service that the first day global gross stood at ₹310 million.

The film grossed ₹1000 million on its second day at the global box office, taking its two-day global total gross to ₹5000 million. With this, it became the second-fastest Telugu film of the year after Baahubali: The Beginning to do so. The film managed to collect a total net of 2000 million and a distributor share of 1000 million in two days at the global box office. The film grossed ₹250 million on its third day, taking its three-day global total gross to ₹750 million, thus breaking the records set by Telugu films other than Baahubali: The Beginning. The film grossed a total of ₹1.0125 billion in its first week at the global box office.

The film grossed ₹220 million in its second weekend, taking its ten-day global total gross to ₹1.23 billion. The net and share figures for the ten days stood at ₹980 million and ₹826.3 million, respectively. The film grossed ₹150 million during the weekdays, taking its second week total to ₹370 million and two-week global total gross to ₹1.38 billion. The two-week global net and distributor share figures stood at ₹1.1 billion and ₹900 million, respectively. Witnessing a decline of 50% in its trade due to new releases, the film grossed ₹180 million in its third week, taking its three-week global total gross to ₹1.56 billion, thus becoming the fourth highest grossing south Indian film of all time. The two-week global net and distributor share figures stood at ₹1.25 billion and ₹960 million, respectively.

Witnessing a further drop of 50% in its trade, the film grossed ₹95 million in its fourth week, taking its 28-day global total gross to ₹1.655 billion. On 25 September 2015, it completed a 50-day run in 185 centres, which was considered a record. It also completed its 100-day run in 15 centres on 14 November 2015. Srimanthudu grossed approximately ₹200 crore in its lifetime run at the global box office, and was declared the second-highest grossing Telugu film ever.

==== Overseas ====
Srimanthudu collected approximately US$0.5 million from 117 locations on Thursday premiere shows held in the United States. The film collected US$1,753,698 (₹111.8 million) from about 150 screens at the United States box office in two days, which Taran Adarsh called an "impressive" start. By the end of its first weekend, Srimanthudu collected a total of US$2.1 million at the United States box office and became the second-highest grossing Telugu film of all time in the country. It also became the second Telugu film to cross the US$2 million mark, after Baahubali: The Beginning.

In its second weekend, Srimanthudu collected US$342,010 from 102 screens at the United States box office thus taking its ten-day total to US$2,654,658 (₹173.5 million). In ten days, the film collected US$8,036 (₹0.52 million) from two screens at the Canada box office and approximately ₹70 million at the United Arab Emirates box office. In its second weekend, Srimanthudu collected RM4,764 from two screens in Malaysia, taking its ten-day total to RM15,178 (₹0.24 million). With this, it became the second-highest grossing Telugu film in the international market by collecting a total of approximately US$3,735,139 (₹242.2 million).

In its third weekend, Srimanthudu stood at the second place in the Indian films at the United States box office. It collected US$94,498 (₹6.257 million) from 46 screens. The United States box office total stood at US$2,820,214 (₹188 million), which was considered quite a remarkable achievement for a South Indian film. After losing 49% of screens due to new releases, Srimanthudu collected US$27,647 from 24 screens in its fourth weekend. The United States box office total stood at US$2,869,560 (₹190.7 million). By then, the film's screening had ended in Canada, the United Arab Emirates, and other key international markets. Srimanthudu lost eighteen screens to Bhale Bhale Magadivoy and other new releases, thus witnessing a drop of 75% in its business. Collecting US$7,538 from six screens, the film's 31-day United States box office total stood at US$2,882,809 (₹192.6 million), with a per-screen average of US$1,256.

== Accolades ==
Ceremony	Category	Nominee	Result	Ref.
63rd Filmfare Awards South	Filmfare Award for Best Film – Telugu	Mythri Movie Makers / G. Mahesh Babu Entertainment Pvt. Ltd	Nominated	
63rd Filmfare Awards South	Filmfare Award for Best Director – Telugu	Koratala Siva	Nominated	
63rd Filmfare Awards South	Filmfare Award for Best Actor – Telugu	Mahesh Babu	Won	
63rd Filmfare Awards South	Filmfare Award for Best Actress – Telugu	Shruti Haasan	Nominated	
63rd Filmfare Awards South	Filmfare Award for Best Supporting Actor – Telugu	Jagapati Babu	Nominated	
63rd Filmfare Awards South	Filmfare Award for Best Music Director – Telugu	Devi Sri Prasad	Won	
63rd Filmfare Awards South	Filmfare Award for Best Lyricist – Telugu	Ramajogayya Sastry (for "Srimanthuda")	Nominated	
63rd Filmfare Awards South	Filmfare Award for Best Male Playback Singer - Telugu	M. L. R. Karthikeyan (for "Srimanthuda")	Won	
63rd Filmfare Awards South	Filmfare Award for Best Male Playback Singer - Telugu	Yazin Nizar (for "Charuseela")	Nominated	
IIFA Utsavam 2015	Best Picture	Y. Ravi Shankar / G. Mahesh Babu Entertainment Pvt. Ltd	Nominated	
IIFA Utsavam 2015	Best Director	Koratala Siva	Nominated	
IIFA Utsavam 2015	Best Performance In A Leading Role – Male	Mahesh Babu	Won	
IIFA Utsavam 2015	Best Performance In A Leading Role – Female	Shruti Haasan	Won	
IIFA Utsavam 2015	Best Performance In A Supporting Role – Male	Jagapati Babu	Won	
IIFA Utsavam 2015	Best Performance In A Supporting Role – Female	Tulasi	Nominated	
IIFA Utsavam 2015	Best Performance In A Comic Role	Vennela Kishore	Nominated	
IIFA Utsavam 2015	Best Performance In A Negative Role	Sampath Raj	Nominated	
IIFA Utsavam 2015	Best Music Direction	Devi Sri Prasad	Won	
IIFA Utsavam 2015	Best Lyrics	Ramajogayya Sastry (for "Rama Rama", "Charuseela", "Jaago")	Won	
IIFA Utsavam 2015	Best Playback Singer – Male	Sagar (for "Jatha Kalise")	Won	
5th South Indian International Movie Awards	SIIMA Award for Best Film (Telugu)	Mythri Movie Makers	Nominated	
5th South Indian International Movie Awards	SIIMA Award for Best Director (Telugu)	Koratala Siva	Nominated	
5th South Indian International Movie Awards	SIIMA Award for Best Actor (Telugu)	Mahesh Babu	Won	
5th South Indian International Movie Awards	SIIMA Award for Best Actress (Telugu)	Shruti Haasan	Won	
5th South Indian International Movie Awards	SIIMA Award for Best Supporting Actor (Telugu)	Jagapati Babu	Nominated	
5th South Indian International Movie Awards	SIIMA Award for Best Supporting Actor (Telugu)	Rajendra Prasad	Won	
5th South Indian International Movie Awards	Best Actor In A Negative Role	Sampath Raj	Nominated	
5th South Indian International Movie Awards	SIIMA Award for Best Music Director (Telugu)	Devi Sri Prasad	Won	
5th South Indian International Movie Awards	SIIMA Award for Best Lyricist (Telugu)	Ramajogayya Sastry (for "Rama Rama")	Won	
5th South Indian International Movie Awards	SIIMA Award for Best Male Playback Singer (Telugu)	Raghu Dixit (for "Jaago")	Nominated	
5th South Indian International Movie Awards	SIIMA Award for Best Male Playback Singer (Telugu)	Sagar (for "Jatha Kalise")	Won	
14th Santosham Film Awards	Best Director	Koratala Siva	Won	
14th Santosham Film Awards	Best Editing	Kotagiri Venkateswara Rao	Won	
14th Santosham Film Awards	Best Supporting Actor	Rajendra Prasad	Won	
14th Santosham Film Awards	Best Music Director Award	Devi Sri Prasad	Won	
Nandi Awards of 2015	Best Popular Feature Film	Yelamanchili Ravi Shankar, Yerneni Naveen, Mahesh Babu	Won	
Nandi Awards of 2015	Best Actor	Mahesh Babu	Won	
Nandi Awards of 2015	Best Lyricist	Ramajogayya Sastry (for "O Nindu Bhumi")	Won	

== Legacy ==
After the release of the movie, Srimanthudu, police officers and district level officers adopted 523 and 606 panchayats, respectively, in Telangana and Andhra Pradesh, which Deccan Herald called a feat that India's prime minister Narendra Modi's Saansad Adarsh Gram scheme had failed to do. Actors, bureaucrats, and politicians also announced plans to develop the backward villages. Mahesh adopted his father Krishna's native village Burripalem, a minor panchayat in Tenali, and announced a plan to address basic needs of the community such as potable drinking water and better roads and drainage systems. After discussing with Telangana's then Rural Development minister K. T. Rama Rao, Mahesh decided to adopt Siddhapuram, a village in Mahabubnagar district. After the film's release, many of Mahesh's fans began using eco-friendly modes of transportation.

According to Y. Sunita Chowdary of The Hindu, Srimanthudu's success "heralded the acceptance of new stories and a rejection of template comedies that have been recycled for over ten years". Similarly, writer Kona Venkat stated, "People are ready to encourage new subjects, as it was proved with Srimanthudu. There are no comic scenes in the film and it runs purely on story and was successful". Celebrities such as Manchu Vishnu, Nithin, Harish Shankar, Gopimohan and others praised the film. Director S. S. Rajamouli opined that Srimanthudu's success lies in the "clever mixture of village adoption with family sentiment", adding that Mahesh "looks cool, acts subtle, talks mellow" and the overall effect is "flabbergasting". Director Ram Gopal Varma said that Srimanthudu proved that impact "doesn't only come from 100 of crores and 100 days of shooting" and "a simple story and plain closeups of Mahesh can too". Kamal Haasan called Srimanthudu a "classic Telugu commercial masala" film and a "complete, satisfying entertainer".
