= Bantrothu Bharya =

1974 Telugu film

- Directed by: Dasari Narayana Rao
- Produced by: Allu Aravind; Dasari Narayana Murthy
- Starring: Chalam; Krishnam Raju; Vijaya Nirmala; Srividya
- Music by: Ramesh Naidu
- Distributed by: Geetha Art Productions
- Release date: 1974
- Country: India
- Language: Telugu

Bantrothu Bharya (translation: The Peon's Wife) is a 1974 Telugu drama film directed by Dasari Narayana Rao and produced by Allu Aravind and Dasari Narayana Murthy under Geetha Arts. The film stars Chalam, Krishnam Raju, Srividya and Vijaya Nirmala in the lead roles. The music was composed by Ramesh Naidu. It is the first film produced by Geetha Arts. It was successful at the box-office. The film was remade of Malayalam movie Bhoomidevi Pushpiniyayi (1974).

== Cast ==
- Chalam
- Krishnam Raju
- Vijaya Nirmala
- Sri Vidya
- Rao Gopal Rao
- Allu Ramalingaiah
- Suryakantham
- Kommineni Seshagiri Rao
- Edida Nageswara Rao
- Mada Venkateswara Rao
- Sakshi Ranga Rao
