= Love Reddy =

2024 Indian romantic drama film

- Theatrical release poster
- Directed by: Smaran Reddy P
- Written by: Smaran Reddy P
- Produced by: Hemalatha Reddy; Madhan Gopal Reddy; Naveen Reddy; Ravendra G; Prabanjan Reddy; Sunanda B Reddy; Naga Raju Beerappa
- Starring: Anjan Ramachendra; Shravani Krishnaveni
- Cinematography: Askar Ali; Mohan Chary; K Shiva Shankara Vara Prasad
- Edited by: Kotagiri Venkateswara Rao
- Music by: Prince Henry
- Production companies: Seheri Studios; MGR Films; Geethansh Productions
- Release date: 18 October 2024
- Running time: 138 minutes
- Country: India
- Language: Telugu

Love Reddy is a 2024 Indian Telugu-language romantic drama film written and directed by Smaran Reddy P and produced by Hemalatha Reddy, Madhan Gopal Reddy, Naveen Reddy, Ravendra G, Prabanjan Reddy, Sunanda B Reddy, and Naga Raju Beerappa under Geethansh Productions.

It features Anjan Ramachendra, Shravani in lead roles alongside Manjula Reddy, Karthik Vaibhav, NT Ramaswamy, Ganesh DS, Vani Channarayapatna, Ravikumar, Raghu Dayear, Jyothi Madan, Gouthami Dharmendra and Vinod Alamuru.

The music of the film is composed by Prince Henry while Askar Ali, Mohan Chary, and K Shiva Shankara Vara Prasad are the cinematographers. Film Editing is done by Kotagiri Venkateswara Rao. The film was released on 18 October 2024.

== Plot ==
Narayana Reddy, a co-partner in a garments industry, is perceived as inventive by his family, although he becomes enamored with Divya, a government employee. He firmly believes that Divya reciprocates his affection, although the reality appears otherwise. Despite his family members' attempts to persuade him to abandon his obstinacy, he chooses to adhere to his convictions.

== Cast ==
- Anjan Ramachendra as Narayana Reddy
- Shravani Krishnaveni as Divya
- NT Ramaswamy as Keshava Reddy
- Ganesh DS as Arjun
- Vani Channarayapatna as Hema
- Ravikumar as Bayyappa Reddy
- Raghu Iyer as Manohar
- Jyothi Madan as Sweety
- Gouthami Dharmendra as Jyothi
- Vinod Alamuru
- Manjula reddy as Lakshmi
- Karthik Vaibhav as Shailesh

== Soundtrack ==
The music and background score is composed by Prince Henry.

=== Tracklisting ===
No.	Title	Singer(s)	Lyrics	Length
1	"Koyilamma"	Sid Sriram	Anantha Sriram	3:54
2	"O Saathiya"	Haricharan, Lipsika		4:09
3	"Love Reddy"	Vijay Prakash		3:23
4	"Pranam Kanna"	Kailash Kher	Krishnakanth	4:25
5	"Pranam Kanna" (female Version)	Aditi Bhavaraju	Suresh Banisetti	4:25
6	"Pranam Kanna" (end rolling)	Ritesh G Rao	Raghuram, Sanapati Bharadwaj Patrudu	4:25
			Total length	23:55

== Reception ==
Y. Maheswara Reddy of Bangalore Mirror rated the film three out of five stars and wrote, "The problem with this movie is that it is a little bit slow in the pre-intermission session. Anjan Ramachendra has to improve his acting skills. Shravani has not much to do, except in the climax scene."

Kausalya Rachavelpula of The Hans India gave the film two-and-a-half out of five stars and wrote, "While Love Reddy starts as a typical love story, it quickly sets itself apart with its deep emotional core and gripping narrative. The first half might seem predictable, but the movie truly hits its stride in the second half, where the suspense builds and the story takes unexpected turns." B. H. Harsh of The New Indian Express wrote, "Everything remotely good about Love Reddy is undone by its use of the oldest trick in the Telugu cinema book—never question a man’s faith in his romantic instincts and save place for a woman’s true feelings only in the final act. No, thank you."
