= Paradesi (1998 film) =

1998 Indian Telugu-language film

- Directed by: K. Raghavendra Rao
- Produced by: C. Aswini Dutt; Allu Aravind
- Starring: Viswa; Madhav; Tanooja; Monnette; Brahmanandam; AVS; Babu Mohan
- Cinematography: V. Jayaram
- Edited by: Marthand K. Venkatesh
- Music by: M. M. Keeravani
- Production company: Sri Raghavendra Movie Corporation
- Distributed by: Geetha Arts
- Release date: 15 January 1998
- Running time: 145 minutes
- Country: India
- Language: Telugu

Paradesi (transl. Foreigner) is a 1998 Indian Telugu-language romantic drama film directed by K. Raghavendra Rao and produced by him under the banner Sri Raghavendra Movie Corporation, in collaboration with C. Aswini Dutt and Allu Aravind. The film is notable for its talent search campaign, which invited aspiring actors through Gemini TV and featured new faces Viswa, Madhav, Tanuja, and California-based model Monnette in the lead roles.

Primarily shot in the United States, the film features a soundtrack composed by M. M. Keeravani. Paradesi was released on 15 January 1998, coinciding with the Sankranti festival. However, despite the festive release, the film received only below-average openings and was a box office failure.

== Plot ==
Gopal (Madhav) is a young man who prefers to choose his own life partner, refusing to accept a marriage arranged by his elders. His father, Rayudu (Thanikella Bharani), has a friend named Bangarraju (AVS), who lives in the United States and wants his daughter, Jyothi (Tanuja), to marry Gopal. Hoping that Gopal will change his mind after meeting Jyothi, Rayudu arranges for Gopal to visit the US. At the same time, Rayudu's former friend turned rival, Nayudu (Babu Mohan), plans to send his son, Krishna (Viswa), to the US as well.

Though their fathers are rivals, Gopal and Krishna are close friends, and they travel to America together. Gopal shares his dilemma with Krishna and convinces him to meet Jyothi in his place. Upon meeting her, Krishna falls in love with Jyothi, while Gopal is drawn to her American friend, Catherine (Monnette). When Rayudu and Nayudu visit the US to meet their children, they discover the truth about the situation. After an initial confrontation, both fathers come to accept their children's decisions and reconcile their differences, becoming friends once again.

The main obstacle to Gopal's marriage arises from Catherine’s father, David, who strongly opposes the union. Rayudu and Nayudu try to convince him, but David hides Catherine. They eventually find her and rescue her from captivity. During a confrontation, a chase ensues, and David is injured in an accident. Gopal saves him, earning David’s approval and resolving the conflict.

== Cast ==
- Viswa (Suresh Nair) as Krishna
- Madhav Dalvi as Gopal
- Tanuja as Jyothi
- Monet Quick as Catherine
- Brahmanandam
- AVS as Bagarraju
- Tanikella Bharani as Rayudu
- Babu Mohan as Nayudu
- Manorama

== Production ==
Paradesi is directed by veteran filmmaker K. Raghavendra Rao and produced under his banner, Sri Raghavendra Movie Corporation, in collaboration with C. Aswini Dutt and Allu Aravind.

The film gained attention for its talent search campaign, which invited applications through Gemini TV. Thousands of aspiring actors were screened, and the selected participants were given opportunities to feature in the film.

Primarily shot in the United States, Paradesi introduced new faces Viswa, Madhav, Tanuja, and California-based model Moni, marking their debuts in the film industry.

== Soundtrack ==
Paradesi

Film score by M. M. Keeravani
- Released: 1998
- Genre: Soundtrack
- Producer: M. M. Keeravani

All music is composed by M. M. Keeravani.

No.	Title	Lyrics	Singer(s)	Length
1.	"Teluginti Peratilona"	Chandrabose	K. S. Chithra, Unnikrishnan
2.	"Chandana Charchita"	Veturi	Mano, Sangeetha, Malgadi Shubha
3.	"Boorela Vari Ammayiki"	Chandrabose	Mano, Swarnalatha, Sangeetha, M. M. Keeravani, Chandrabose, Malgadi Shubha
4.	"Bondumalli bugga meeda"	Chandrabose	Rajesh, Sowmya, Malgadi Shubha, Tabitha, Unnikrishnan, Swarnalatha
5.	"Jagati Sigalo"	Veturi	Sujatha Mohan, M. M. Keeravani
6.	"Mallee Mallee"	Chandrabose	K. S. Chithra, S. P. Balasubrahmanyam
7.	"Chooshara"	Chandrabose	S. P. Balasubrahmanyam, Malgadi Shubha
8.	"Tanuko Arako"	Chandrabose	Sujatha Mohan, Mano
9.	"Paradesi"	Chandrabose	Mano, Malgadi Shubha

== Release ==
Paradesi was released on 15 January 1998 with 41 prints on the occasion of the Sankranti festival. Despite the festive release, the film received only below-average openings and failed to attract a significant audience.

== Reception ==
A critic from Andhra Today noted, "The movie comes as a big disappointment to the audience whose expectations were raised high". The film was also reviewed by Zamin Ryot.
