= Santosham Best Actress Award =

Telugu film award

The Santosham Best Actress Award is given by the Santosham Magazine as part of its annual Santosham Film Awards for Telugu films. The award was first given to Asin in 2003. Here is a list of the award winners and the films for which they won.

== Superlatives ==
Superlative	Best Actress	Record
Top	Anushka Shetty, Samantha Ruth Prabhu, Shriya Saran	3 wins
Runner-up	Tamannaah Bhatia, Pooja Hegde	2 wins

== Winners ==
Year	Photos of winners	Actress	Film	Ref.
2003 (2nd)		Asin	Sivamani	
2004 (3rd)		Trisha Krishnan	Varsham	
2005 (4th)		Charmy Kaur	Anukokunda Oka Roju	
2006 (5th)		Genelia D'Souza	Bommarillu	
2007 (6th)		Bhumika Chawla	Anasuya	
2008 (7th)		Ileana D'Cruz	Jalsa	
2009 (8th)		Anushka Shetty	Arundhati	
2010 (9th)		Anushka Shetty	Vedam	
2011 (10th)		Nayanthara	Sri Rama Rajyam	
2011 (10th)		Tamannaah Bhatia	100% Love	
2012 (11th)		Samantha Ruth Prabhu	Eega	
2013 (12th)		Samantha Ruth Prabhu	Attarintiki Daredi	
2014 (13th)		Shriya Saran	Manam	
2015 (14th)		Anushka Shetty	Rudhramadevi	
2016 (15th)		Samantha Ruth Prabhu	A Aa	
2017 (16th)		Shriya Saran	Gautamiputra Satakarni	
2018 (17th)	—			
2019 (20th)		Tamannaah Bhatia	F2: Fun and Frustration	
2020 (20th)		Pooja Hegde	Ala Vaikunthapurramuloo	
2021-22 (21st)		Pooja Hegde	Most Eligible Bachelor, Radhe Shyam	
2021-22 (21st)		Shraddha Srinath (Tamil)	Chakra, Maara	
2021-22 (21st)		Apurva (Kannada)	Krishna Talkies	
2021-22 (21st)		Sangeetha Sringeri (Kannada)	777 Charlie, Lucky Man	
2021-22 (21st)		Vinitha Koshy (Malayalam)	Paka	
2023 (22nd)		Samyuktha	Virupaksha	
2023 (22nd)		Shriya Saran (Kannada)	Kabzaa	
2023 (22nd)		Gayatri Arun (Malayalam)	Ennalum Ente Aliya	
