= Intlo Srimathi Veedhilo Kumari =

- DVD cover
- Directed by: K. Vasu
- Written by: Chintapalli Ramana
- Based on: Poochakkoru Mookkuthi by Priyadarshan
- Produced by: Allu Aravind; C. Ashwani Dutt
- Starring: Srikanth; Prabhu Deva; Aarti Chhabria
- Cinematography: V. Jayaram
- Edited by: Marthand K. Venkatesh
- Music by: Ghantadi Krishna
- Production company: Siri Media Arts
- Release date: 13 August 2004
- Running time: 135 mins
- Country: India
- Language: Telugu

Intlo Srimathi Veedhilo Kumari is a 2004 Telugu-language comedy film directed by K. Vasu. It stars Srikanth, Prabhu Deva and Aarti Chhabria. A remake of Priyadarshan's 2003 Hindi film Hungama, which itself borrowed its story from the director's Poochakkoru Mookkuthi (1984). The same story was earlier adapted in Telugu as Gopal Rao Gari Ammayi in 1980 also directed by K. Vasu. The film opened to mixed reviews in August 2004.

== Cast ==
- Srikanth as Sukumar
- Prabhu Deva as Gopal
- Aarti Chhabria as Anjali
- Prakash Raj as Sundara Murthy
- Urvashi as Anjali
- Chandra Mohan
- Brahmanandam
- Kavitha
- Tanikella Bharani
- M. S. Narayana
- Ali
- Venu Madhav
- Dharmavarapu Subramanyam
- Gundu Hanumantha Rao
- Babloo
- Shilpa Chakravarti

== Soundtrack ==
No.	Title	Singer(s)	Length
1.	"A Ante Yamudu"	S. P. Balasubrahmanyam, Sarita
2.	"Naa Katuka"	Hariharan, Madhu Sri
3.	"Bhama Neetho"	Udit Narayan, Kavita Krishnamurthy
4.	"Premannadi"	Kumar Sanu, Harini
5.	"Nee Ollo Ne Neerchu"	Rajesh, Shreya Ghoshal

== Release ==
Jeevi of Idlebrain.com gave the film a mixed review, citing "the first half is average and second half is a letdown" and "the main drawback of the film is the mistiming of comedy". He added "comedy films do not work out when the comedy timing in those films goes amiss". Another critic from MyMazaa.com stated "on the evidence of this film, the director lacks the skill to handle such subjects with finesse" and added "there is a thin line dividing comedy and confusion and that he lets the film slip into the latter stream". Telugu Cinema called it "average and time pass".

The film did not perform well at the box office, and post-release, Srikanth stated he did the film for "emotional reasons" and signed the film on the belief that Allu Aravind had a good stature in the industry.
