= Aradhana (1987 film) =

1987 Indian Telugu-language romance film

- Theatrical release poster
- Directed by: Bharathiraja
- Screenplay by: Bharathiraja
- Story by: K. Somasundreshwar
- Produced by: Allu Aravind
- Starring: Chiranjeevi; Suhasini; Radhika; Rajasekhar
- Cinematography: B. Kannan
- Edited by: T. Thirunavukkarasu
- Music by: Ilaiyaraaja
- Production company: Geetha Arts
- Release date: 27 March 1987
- Country: India
- Language: Telugu

Aradhana (transl. Admiration) is a 1987 Indian Telugu-language romantic musical film directed by Bharathiraja. It stars Chiranjeevi, Suhasini, Rajasekhar and Radhika. The music was scored by Ilaiyaraaja. Allu Aravind produced this film on his home production, Geetha Arts. It was a remake of Bharathiraja's Tamil film Kadalora Kavithaigal (1986). The film was released on 27 March 1987, and was a musical hit

== Plot ==
Puliraju (Chiranjeevi) is a small-time rowdy in a small town. He meets Jennifer(Suhasini), who arrives in that town as a school teacher. Jennifer slaps and berates him for ill-treating his mother. Puliraju, instead of taking revenge on her, gets attracted towards her and manages to join as her student. Over a period of time, Puliraju transforms in his looks behaviour and leaves his past life behind. Over a few reels, they both get attracted towards each other, but neither of them express their feelings. His mother, surprised by changes in his behaviour, brings his maradalu Gangamma(Radhika) from his village and tries to marry him off. At the same time, Jennifer's family friend Rajasekhar arrives and her father plans her marriage with him. Puliraju, struggling with change within himself is attacked by his old enemies and is hospitalized. Jennifer reaches the hospital, understands his love towards her and they both unite in the climax.

== Cast ==
- Chiranjeevi as Puliraju
- Suhasini as Jennifer
- Radhika as Gangamma
- Rajasekhar as Lawrence
- Anuradha Vasudev as Josephine
- P. L. Narayana
- Bheemeswara Rao
- C. H. Krishna Murthy
- Prasad
- Manohar
- Ashok
- Ravi Bharath
- Babu Rao
- Dubbing Janaki as Puliraju's mother
- Lalitha Sharma

== Soundtrack ==
The soundtrack was composed by Ilaiyaraaja and all lyrics were written by Acharya Aatreya. The tunes were reused from the original.

Track listing
No.	Title	Singer(s)	Length
1.	"Hai Jamaku Jamu"	S. Janaki	4:30
2.	"Emauthundhi"	S. P. Balasubrahmanyam, S. Janaki	4:34
3.	"Theeganai Mallenai"	S. P. Balasubrahmanyam, S. Janaki	4:21
4.	"Are Emaindhi"	S. P. Balasubrahmanyam, S. Janaki	4:32
Total length:			18:00
