= Mangalyam Tantunanena =

- DVD cover
- Directed by: V. S. Reddy
- Written by: Bhupathi Raja
- Story by: Bhupathi Raja
- Based on: Pavitra Bandham (Telugu)
- Produced by: Allu Aravind
- Starring: Ravichandran; Ramya Krishna
- Cinematography: G. S. V. Seetharam
- Edited by: Shyam
- Music by: V. Manohar
- Production company: Geetha Arts
- Release date: 12 August 1998
- Running time: 153 minutes
- Country: India
- Language: Kannada

Mangalyam Tantunanena (Kannada: ಮಾಂಗಲ್ಯಂ ತಂತುನಾನೇನ) is a 1998 Indian Kannada language romantic drama film directed by V. S. Reddy and produced by Allu Aravind. The film stars Ravichandran along with Ramya Krishna and S. P. Balasubrahmanyam among others.

The film is the Kannada remake of the 1996 Telugu film Pavitra Bandham and was also remade in Tamil as Priyamanavale and in Hindi as Hum Apke Dil Me Rahte Hain.

== Cast ==
- Ravichandran as Vijay
- Ramya Krishna as Radha
- S. P. Balasubrahmanyam as Vishwanath, Vijay's father
- Sumithra
- Bhavyashri Rai
- Sadashiva Brahmavar as Ramaiah
- Mandya Ramesh
- Rekha Das
- Sanketh Kashi
- Ravi Babu
- Vijay Kashi
- K. S. Chitra as herself (special appearance)

== Production ==
Some scenes were shot in Switzerland.

== Soundtrack ==
The music was composed by V. Manohar and lyrics for the soundtrack were written by K. Kalyan.

Mangalyam Tantunaanena

Soundtrack album by V. Manohar
- Released: 1998
- Genre: Feature film soundtrack
- Label: Anand Audio

V. Manohar chronology
Mr. Putsami (1998)	Mangalyam Tantunaanena (1998)	Megha Bantu Megha (1998)

Track listing
No.	Title	Singer(s)	Length
1.	"Dhir Dhir Thillana"	S. P. Balasubrahmanyam, K. S. Chithra	5:12
2.	"Pada Pada Seri"	S. P. Balasubrahmanyam, K. S. Chithra	4:30
3.	"ABCD Kaliva"	S. P. Balasubrahmanyam, Kusuma	4:20
4.	"Yaarivanu Dream Boy"	S. P. Balasubrahmanyam	4:38
5.	"Daddy Daddy Sweet"	S. P. Balasubrahmanyam, Rajesh Krishnan	3:48
6.	"Karyeshu Dasi"	Ramesh Chandra	4:22
7.	"Nimbe Nimbe"	S. P. Balasubrahmanyam, K. S. Chithra	3:51
