= Boyapati Srinu =

Indian filmmaker (born 1970)

Boyapati Sreenu
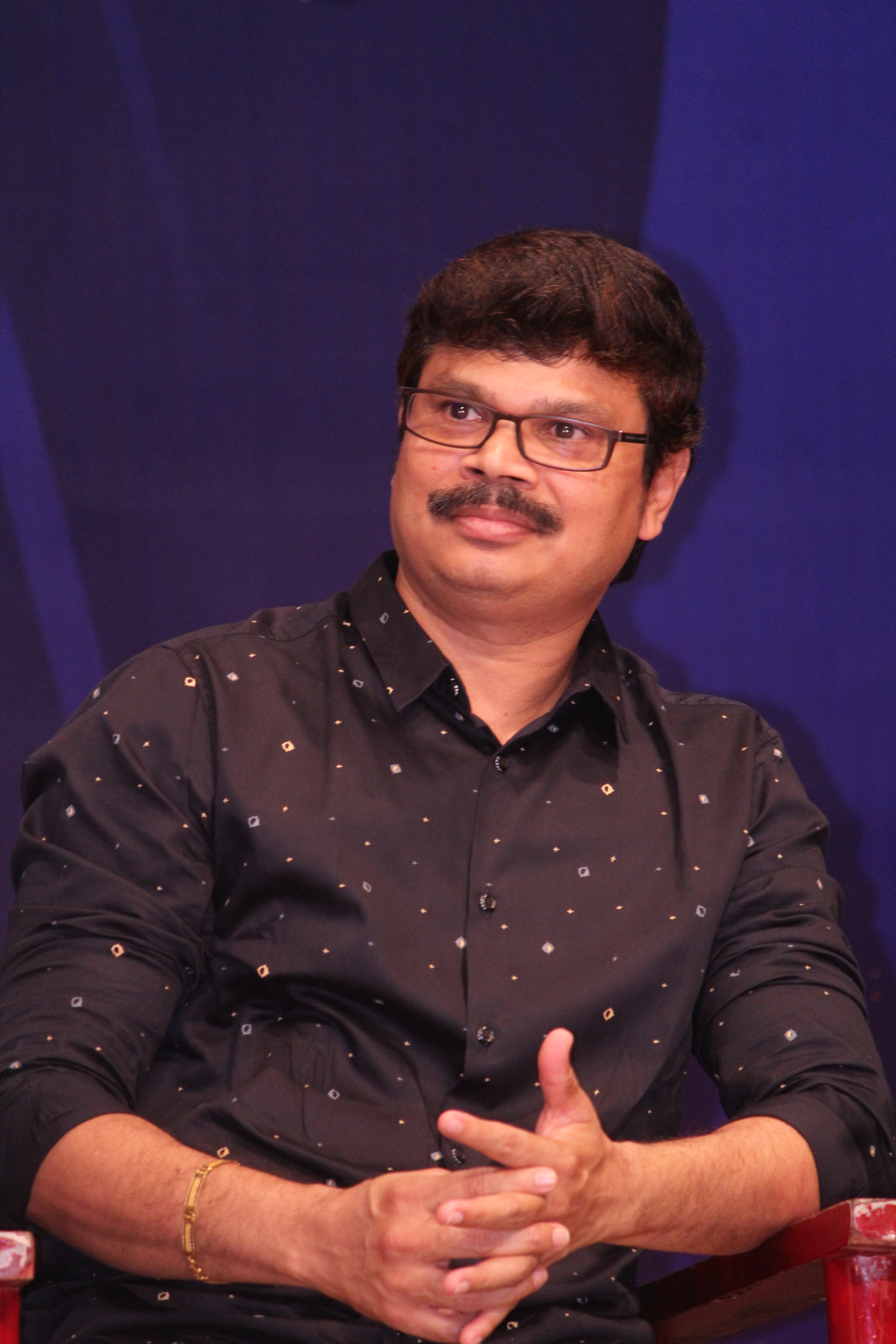
- Boyapati in 2018
- Born: Boyapati Srinivas Chowdary; 25 April 1970 (age 56); Pedakakani, Guntur, Andhra Pradesh, India
- Education: JKC College; Nagarjuna University
- Occupations: Film director, screenwriter
- Years active: 2002–present
- Spouse: Vilekha
- Children: 3
- Relatives: Posani Krishna Murali (cousin)

Boyapati Srinivas Chowdary, also known as Boyapati Sreenu, is an Indian film director, producer and screenwriter. He is best known for directing over the top action films in Telugu cinema and has garnered two state Nandi Awards.

== Early life ==
Boyapati Srinivas Chowdary was born in Pedakakani in Guntur district, Andhra Pradesh. He obtained his degree from JKC College in Guntur and attended Nagarjuna University for post-graduation. His family runs a photo studio. Boyapati was interested in photography and worked as a part-time reporter for the Eenadu newspaper. To pursue a career in films, he moved to Hyderabad and his cousin Posani Krishna Murali advised Boyapati to work in the direction department of Muthyala Subbaiah's studio in 1997. Boyapati worked with Subbaiah on films like Oka Chinna Maata, Gokulamlo Seeta, Pelli Chesukundam, Pavitra Prema, Annayya and Manasunna Maaraju.

Boyapati is married to Vilekha, and the couple has three children.

== Career ==
In 2005, Boyapati made his directorial debut with Bhadra, which starred Ravi Teja, Meera Jasmine, and Prakash Raj. Tulasi was his second film. In 2010, Boyapati's third release was Simha, starring Nandamuri Balakrishna in a dual role alongside Nayanthara and Sneha Ullal. In 2012, he made his fourth film Dammu, starring Jr NTR, Trisha and Karthika Nair. Later in 2014, Boyapati reunited with Balakrishna for Legend which opened to positive reviews with critics opining that he has delivered a "mass, masala entertainer with some sentimental touch that will appeal to both the classes and the masses."

== Filmography ==
Key
†	Denotes films that have not yet been released

Year	Title	Notes
2005	Bhadra	
2007	Tulasi	
2010	Simha	
2012	Dammu	
2014	Legend	
2016	Sarrainodu	
2017	Jaya Janaki Nayaka	
2019	Vinaya Vidheya Rama	
2021	Akhanda	
2023	Skanda	
2025	Akhanda 2: Thaandavam	

== Awards ==
=== Nandi Awards ===
- Nandi Award for Best Director - Legend - (2014)
- B. N. Reddy National Award - (2016)

=== Santosham Film Awards ===
- Best Director - Sarrainodu at 15th Santosham Film Awards in 2017
