= Santosham Best Debut Actress Award =

Telugu film award for Best Debut Actress

The Santosham Best Debut Actress Award is given by the Santosham Film magazine as part of its annual Santosham Film Awards for Telugu films.

The award was first given to Kamalinee Mukherjee in 2003. Here is a list of the award winners and the films for which they won.

Year	Actress	Film
2023	Vaishnavi Chaitanya	Baby
2019	Shivathmika Rajashekar	Dorasaani
2015	Hebah Patel	Kumari 21F
2014	Pooja Hegde	Oka Laila Kosam
2009	Karthika Nair	Josh
2008	Sneha Ullal	Ullasamga Utsahamga
2007	Hansika Motwani	Desamuduru
2003	Kamalinee Mukherjee	Anand
