= Nandi Award for Best Popular Feature Film =

Indian film award

The Nandi Award for First Best Popular Feature Film was instituted in 2005.

Year	Film	Producer
2016	Janatha Garage	Y. Naveen, Y. Ravi Shankar, C. V. Mohan
2015	Srimanthudu	Y. Naveen, Y. Ravi Shankar, C. V. Mohan, Mahesh Babu
2014	Loukyam	V. Anand Prasad
2013	Attarintiki Daredi	B. V. S. N. Prasad
2012	Julayi	S. Radha Krishna
2011	Dookudu	Ram Achanta; Gopichand Achanta; Anil Sunkara
2010	Maryada Ramanna	Shobha Yarlagadda; Prasad Devineni
2009	Magadheera	Allu Aravind
2008	Ready	Sravanthi Ravi Kishore
2007	Adavari Matalaku Ardhale Verule	N.V. Prasad; Shanam Naga Ashok Kumar
2006	Pokiri	Puri Jagannadh; Manjula Ghattamaneni
2005	Pellam Pichodu	Rampalli Ramabhadra Sastry
