= Santosham Best Dialogue Award =

Indian film award

The Santosham Best Dialogues Award is given by the Santosham Film magazine as part of its annual Santosham Film Awards for Telugu films.

The award was first given in 2003. Here is a list of the award winners and the films for which they won.

Year	Writer(s)	Film	Ref
2009	Chintapalli Ramana	Arundhati
2008	Kona Venkat	Ready
2007	Kona Venkat	Dhee
2006	Paruchuri Brothers	Stalin
2005
2004	Paruchuri Brothers	Varsham
2003	Paruchuri Brothers
