= Santosham Best Director Award =

Indian film award

The Santosham Best Director Award is given by the Santosham Film magazine as part of its annual Santosham Film Awards for Telugu films.

The award was first given in 2003. Here is a list of the award winners and the films for which they won.

== Winners ==
Year	Director	Film	Ref
2018	Sukumar	Rangasthalam
2017	Sankalp Reddy	Ghazi
2016	Boyapati Srinu	Sarrainodu
2015	Koratala Siva	Srimanthudu
2014	Vikram Kumar	Manam
2010	Boyapati Srinu	Simha
2009	Kodi Ramakrishna	Arundathi
2008	Trivikram Srinivas	Jalsa
2007	Sekhar Kammula	Happy Days
2006	Puri Jagannadh	Pokiri
2005	Mohan Krishna Indraganti	Grahanam
2004	Chandra Siddhartha	Aa Naluguru
2003	Puri Jagannadh	Amma Nanna O Tamila Ammayi
