= Kotagiri Venkateswara Rao =

Indian film editor

- Occupation: Editor
- Years active: 1977–present

Kotagiri Venkateswara Rao is an Indian film editor who works primarily in Telugu cinema.

== Personal life ==
His ancestors worked as Diwans for Zamindars. He hails from Nuzvid, Krishna district, Andhra Pradesh. He has three elder brothers and two elder sisters. The eldest of them is Kotagiri Gopala Rao. His father died early leaving the family in a miserable condition. Gopal Rao took control of the family shifted to Madras. He has become an editor under the eminent director Adurthi Subba Rao and 10 others.

Venkateswara Rao did not want to do editing after completing matriculation. But due to compulsion from his brother, He joined his brother in Madras and trained as an editor. K. Raghavendra Rao gave him the first chance to edit three songs in his film Adavi Ramudu in 1977.

== Filmography ==
=== Telugu ===
- Adavi Ramudu (1977)
- Vetagadu (1979)
- Abhilasha (1983)
- Apoorva Sahodarulu (1986)
- Kondaveeti Raja (1986)
- Dharmapatni (1987)
- Alluda Majaka (1995)
- Priya O Priya (1997)
- Raja Kumarudu (1999)
- Vamsi (2000)
- Student No. 1 (2001)
- Indra (2002)
- Raghavendra (2003)
- Gangotri (2003)
- Simhadri (2003)
- Palnati Brahmanayudu (2003)
- Adavi Ramudu (2004)
- Sye (2004)
- Balu ABCDEFG (2005)
- Naa Alludu (2005)
- Subhash Chandra Bose (2005)
- Narasimhudu (2005)
- Chatrapati (2005)
- Jai Chiranjeeva (2005)
- Devadasu (2006)
- Vikramarkudu (2006)
- Chinnodu (2006)
- Khatarnak (2006)
- Okka Magadu (2007)
- Yamadonga (2007)
- Rechipo (2009)
- Naa Style Veru (2009)
- Raju Maharaju (2009)
- Magadheera (2009)
- Maryada Ramanna (2010)
- Darling (2010)
- Simha (2010)
- Jai Bolo Telangana (2011)
- Seema Tapakai (2011)
- Kandireega (2011)
- Rajanna (2011)
- Naa Ishtam (2012)
- Neeku Naaku Dash Dash (2012)
- Dammu (2012)
- Adhinayakudu (2012)
- Endukante...Premanta! (2012)
- Eega (2012)
- Devudu Chesina Manushulu (2012)
- Sarocharu (2012)
- Mirchi (2013)
- Legend (2014)
- Rabhasa (2014)
- Malli Malli Idi Rani Roju (2015)
- Jil (2015)
- Baahubali: The Beginning (2015)
- Srimanthudu (2015)
- Sher (2015)
- Lacchimdeviki O Lekkundi (2015)
- Sarrainodu (2016)
- A Aa (2016)
- Brahmotsavam (2016)
- Arddhanaari (2016)
- Janatha Garage (2016)
- Premam (2016)
- Radha (2017)
- Nene Raju Nene Mantri (2017)
- Baahubali 2: The Conclusion (2017)
- Jaya Janaki Nayaka (2017)
- Ungarala Rambabu (2017)
- Jai Lava Kusa (2017)
- Mahanubhavudu (2017)
- Balakrishnudu (2017)
- 2 Countries (2017)
- Chalo (2018)
- Howrah Bridge (2018)
- Naa Peru Surya (2018)
- Saakshyam (2018)
- Nartanasala (2018)
- Savyasachi (2018)
- Agnyaathavaasi (2018)
- Bhaagamathie (2018)
- Juvva (2018)
- Mahanati (2018)
- Sailaja Reddy Alludu (2018)
- Vinaya Vidheya Rama (2019)
- Sita (2019)
- Prati Roju Pandage (2019)
- World Famous Lover (2020)
- Palasa 1978 (2020)
- Induvadana (2022)
- Radhe Shyam (2022)
- Sita Ramam (2022)
- Ahimsa (2023)
- Kalki 2898 AD (2024)
- Love Reddy (2024)
- Jigel (2025)
- Baahubali: The Epic (2025)
- Champion (2025)
- The Raja Saab (2026)
- Bad Boy Karthik (2026)

=== Tamil ===
- Tik Tik Tik (1981)
- Uzhavan (1993)
- Hero (1994)
- Baahubali: The Beginning (2015)
- Bhaagamathie (2018)

== Awards ==
=== Nandi Awards ===
1. 2004: Sye - Won the Nandi Award for Best Editor
2. 2005: Subhash Chandra Bose - Won the Nandi Award for Best Editor
3. 2007: Yamadonga - Won the Nandi Award for Best Editor
4. 2009: Magadheera - Won the Nandi Award for Best Editor
5. 2010: Darling - Won the Nandi Award for Best Editor
6. 2012: Eega - Won the Nandi Award for Best Editor
7. 2014: Legend - Won the Nandi Award for Best Editor

=== Santosham Film Awards ===
1. 2015: Baahubali: The Beginning & Srimanthudu - Won the Santosham Best Editing Award

=== Vijay Awards ===
1. 2012: Naan E - Won the Vijay Award for Best Editor

== See also ==
- Indian film editors
