= Santosham Best Cinematographer Award =

Indian film award

The Santosham Best Cinematographer Award is given by the Santosham Film magazine as part of its annual Santosham Film Awards for Telugu films.

The award was first given in 2003. Here is a list of the award winners and the films for which they won.

Year	Cinematographer	Film
2014	Prasad Murella	Attarintiki Daredi
2008	Chota K. Naidu	Kotha Bangaru Lokam
2005
2004	S. Gopal Reddy	Varsham
2003	Chota K. Naidu	Tagore & Gangotri
