= Santosham Best Music Director Award =

Indian film award

The Santosham Best Music Director Award is given by the Santosham Film magazine as part of its annual Santosham Film Awards for Telugu films.

The award was first given in 2003. Here is a list of the award winners and the films for which they won.

Year	Music Director	Film
2017	Anup Rubens	Manam
2016	Devi Sri Prasad	Srimanthudu
2014	Devi Sri Prasad	Attharintiki Daaredhi
2012	Devi Sri Prasad	Gabbar Singh
2010	A. R. Rahman	Ye Maaya Chesave
2008	Devi Sri Prasad	Jalsa
2005	Devi Sri Prasad	Nuvvostanante Nenoddantana
2004	Devi Sri Prasad	Varsham
2003	M.M. Keeravani	Gangotri
