= Santosham Best Editing Award =

Indian film award

The Santosham Best Editing Award is given by the Santosham Film magazine as part of its annual Santosham Film Awards for Telugu films.

The award was first given in 2003. Below is a list of the award winners and the films for which they won.

Year	Editor	Film	Ref
2009	Kotagiri Venkateswara Rao	Magadheera
2008	Kotagiri Venkateswara Rao	Ullasamga Utsahamga
2007	Gowtam Raju	Lakshyam
2006
2005
2004	Marthand K. Venkatesh	Anand
2003	Gowtam Raju
