= Allu Aravind =

Indian film producer and businessman (born 1949)

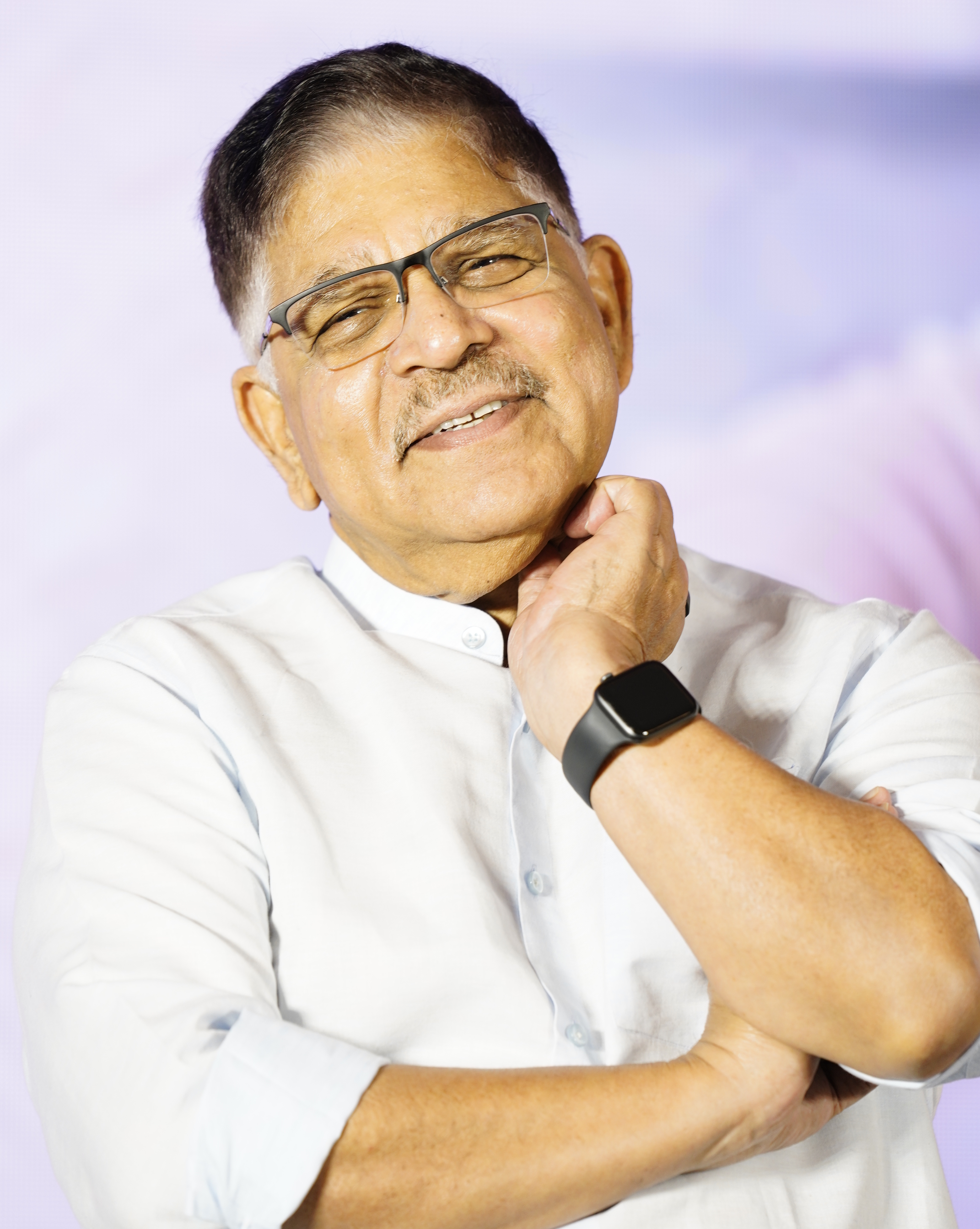
- Born: 10 January 1949 (age 77); Palakollu, Madras Province, India
- Occupation: Film producer
- Spouse: Allu Nirmala
- Children: Allu Venkatesh; Allu Arjun; Allu Sirish
- Parents: Allu Ramalingaiah; Allu Kanakaratnam
- Family: Konidela–Allu family

Allu Aravind (born 10 January 1949) is an Indian film producer, film distributor, and businessman. He is regarded as one of the most successful producers in South Indian cinema. He is the founder of Geetha Arts, a major film production house in the Telugu film industry. He is also the co-owner of Aha, an online streaming service, and the Indian Super League club, Kerala Blasters FC. Aravind won the Filmfare Lifetime Achievement and two Nandi Awards for his work as a producer.

Some of his notable works as a producer include Bantrothu Bharya (1974), Subhalekha (1982), Pasivadi Pranam (1987), Attaku Yamudu Ammayiki Mogudu (1989), Mappillai (1989), Master (1997), Ninaithen Vandhai (1998), Mangalyam Tantunanena (1998), Annayya (2000), Jalsa (2008), Ghajini (2008), Magadheera (2009), Sarrainodu (2016), Ala Vaikuntapuramulo (2020).

== Early life ==
Allu Aravind is born on 10 January 1949 in Palakollu, West Godavari district of Andhra Pradesh. His father, Allu Ramalingaiah is a noted Telugu comic actor who acted in over 1000 films. His sons, Allu Arjun and Allu Sirish are Telugu film actors. His sister Surekha is the wife of Telugu actor Chiranjeevi. Aravind is the maternal uncle (mamaya) of Ram Charan.

== Career ==
Allu Aravind founded Geetha Arts, a film production and distribution company in 1972. The company was named after the Hindu philosophical text Bhagavad Geeta which inspired Allu Aravind. Geetha Arts marked its beginning through the 1974 Telugu film Bantrothu Bharya.

Aravind has produced many films over the years. Jalsa, a 2008 Telugu film starring Pawan Kalyan was the second-highest grosser in Telugu cinema at the time. Their next, Ghajini, a Bollywood film starring Aamir Khan grossed over $45 million at box office, making it the highest grossing Indian film. Magadheera, a big-budget sword-and-sandal epic grossed $25 million at the box office and was the highest-grossing Telugu film of all time at the time of its release.

== Filmography ==
=== Producer ===
==== Telugu ====
Year	Title	Notes	Ref
1974	Bantrotu Bharya	Co-produced with Dasari Narayana Murthy	
1975	Devude Digivaste		
1979	Maavullo Mahasivudu		
1982	Subhalekha	Co-produced with V. V. Sastry under Prashanthi Creations	
1982	Yamakinkarudu		
1984	Hero		
1985	Vijetha		
1987	Aradhana		
1987	Pasivadi Pranam		
1989	Attaku Yamudu Ammayiki Mogudu		
1991	Rowdy Alludu	Co-produced with K. Venkateswara Rao and Panja Prasad under Sri Sai Ram Arts	
1993	Mechanic Alludu		
1994	S. P. Parasuram	Co-produced with G. K Reddy and Mukesh Udeshi under Sai Charan Combines	
1996	Pelli Sandadi	Co-produced with C. Ashwini Dutt and K. Raghavendra Rao under Shri Raghavendra Movie Corporation	
1996	Akkada Ammayi Ikkada Abbayi		
1997	Master		
1998	Paradesi	Co-produced with C. Ashwini Dutt and K. Raghavendra Rao under Shri Raghavendra Movie Corporation	
2000	Annayya	Co-produced with K. Venkateswara Rao under Sri Sai Ram Arts	
2001	Daddy		
2003	Pellam Oorelithe	Co-produced with C. Ashwini Dutt under Siri Media Arts	
2003	Gangotri	Co-produced with C. Ashwini Dutt and K. Raghavendra Rao under United Producers; Marking as KRR's 100th Film	
2003	Johnny		
2004	Intlo Srimathi Veedhilo Kumari	Co-produced with C. Ashwani Dutt under Siri Media Arts	
2005	Bunny	Co-produced with M. Satyanarayana Reddy under Siri Venkateswara Productions Pvt. Limited	
2005	Andarivaadu		
2006	Happy		
2008	Jalsa	Santosham Best Film Award	
2009	Magadheera	National Film Award for Best Special Effects; Nandi Award for Best Popular Feature Film; Filmfare Award for Best Film – Telugu; CineMAA Award for Best Film; Santosham Best Film Award	
2011	100% Love		
2011	Badrinaath		
2014	Kotha Janta		
2014	Pilla Nuvvu Leni Jeevitham		
2015	Bhale Bhale Magadivoy	Co-produced with Bunny Vas under GA2 Pictures	
2016	Sarrainodu		
2016	Srirastu Subhamastu		
2016	Dhruva		
2018	Geetha Govindam	Co-produced with Bunny Vas under GA2 Pictures	
2018	Taxiwaala	Co-produced with Bunny Vas and SKN under GA2 Pictures	
2019	Prati Roju Pandage	Co-produced with Bunny Vas under GA2 Pictures	
2020	Ala Vaikunthapurramuloo		
2021	Chaavu Kaburu Challaga	Co-produced with Bunny Vas under GA2 Pictures	
2021	Most Eligible Bachelor	Co-produced with Bunny Vas under GA2 Pictures	
2022	Ghani	Co-produced with Allu Bobby under Allu Bobby Company	
2022	Pakka Commercial	Co-produced with Bunny Vas under GA2 Pictures	
2022	Urvasivo Rakshasivo	Co-produced with Bunny Vas under GA2 Pictures	
2022	18 Pages	Co-produced with Bunny Vas under GA2 Pictures	
2023	Vinaro Bhagyamu Vishnu Katha	Co-produced with Bunny Vas under GA2 Pictures	
2023	Kotabommali PS	Co-produced with Bunny Vas under GA2 Pictures	
2024	Ambajipeta Marriage Band	Co-produced with Bunny Vas under GA2 Pictures	
2024	Aay	Co-produced with Bunny Vas under GA2 Pictures	
2025	Thandel		
2025	Single		
2025	The Girlfriend		
2026	Aakasamlo Oka Tara		
TBA	M. S - A On-screen Legacy †		

==== Hindi ====
Year	Title	Notes	Ref
1990	Pratibandh		
1994	The Gentleman		
1997	Mere Sapno Ki Rani	Co-produced with C. Ashwani Dutt and K. Raghavendra Rao under Sri Raghavendra Movie Corporation	
1999	Kaun?	Co-produced with Mukesh Udeshi under Kshitij Production Combines	
2000	Kunwara		
2002	Kya Yehi Pyaar Hai		
2003	Calcutta Mail	Co-produced with C. Ashwani Dutt and Mukesh Udeshi under Siri Media Arts	
2008	Ghajini	Stardust Hottest New Film Award	
2022	Jersey	produced under Allu Entertainment	
2023	Shehzada	produced under Allu Entertainment, Remake of Ala Vaikunthapurramuloo; Co-produced with Bhushan Kumar, Krishan Kumar, Aman Gill, S. Radha Krishna and Kartik Aaryan	
2023	Three of Us	produced under Allu Entertainment	

==== Tamil ====
Year	Title	Notes	Ref
1989	Mappillai		
1998	Ninaithen Vandhai	Co-produced with C. Ashwani Dutt and K. Raghavendra Rao under Sri Raghavendra Movie Corporation	
2015	Darling		

==== Kannada ====
Year	Title	Notes	Ref
1998	Mangalyam Tantunanena		
2016	Sundaranga Jaana	produced under GA2 Pictures	

=== Actor ===
- Maa Voollo Mahasivudu (1979) as Sub-Inspector of Police
- Hero (1984)
- Mahanagaramlo Mayagadu (1984)
- Chantabbai (1986)

=== Distributor ===
- Ghajini (2005) (Dubbed version)

== Awards and honours ==
Nandi Awards

- Best Home Viewing Feature Film - Pelli Sandadi
- Best Popular Feature Film - Magadheera (2009)

Filmfare Awards South

- Best Film - Telugu - Magadheera (2009)
- Lifetime Achievement Award (2022)

Other Awards

- Champions of Change Award in 2019, for his exceptional work in social welfare in the state of Andhra Pradesh.
- Santosham Dasari Smarakam Award (producer) at 15th Santosham Film Awards.

== Other works ==
Allu Aravind is one of the minority stake holders of the football club Kerala Blasters FC that competes in the Indian Super League, the top tier of Indian Football. He is a key person and co-owner of aha, a Telugu-streaming over-the-top service.
