= Santosham Best Producer Award =

Cinematic award in India

The Santosham Best Producer Award is given by the Santosham Film magazine as part of its annual Santosham Film Awards for Telugu films.

The award was first given in 2003. Here is a list of the award winners and the films for which they won.

Year	Producer	Film	References
2011	Yalamanchali Sai Babu	Sri Rama Rajyam
2009	Shyam Prasad Reddy	Arundhati
2006	K. L. Narayana	Rakhi
2005	Murali Mohan	Athadu
2004	Nagarjuna	Mass
2003	Nagarjuna	Satyam
