= Santosham Best Film Award =

Indian film award

The Santosham Best Film Award is given by the Santosham Film magazine as part of its annual Santosham Film Awards for Telugu films.

The award was first given in 2003. Here is a list of the award winners and the films for which they won.

== Winners ==
Year	Film	Producer	Ref
2015	Rudhramadevi	Gunasekhar
2014	Manam	The Akkineni Family
2013	Attarintiki Daredi	B. V. S. N. Prasad
2012	Sudigadu	Bhimaneni Srinivasa Rao
2011	Sri Rama Rajyam	Yalamanchali Sai Babu
2010	Simha	Paruchuri Kiriti
2009	Magadheera	Allu Aravind
2008	Jalsa	Allu Aravind
2007	Mee Sreyobhilashi	Sonia Reddy
2006	Bommarillu	Dil Raju
2005	Athadu	M. Rammohan
2004	Varsham	M. S. Raju
2003	Okkadu	M. S. Raju
