= Santosham Best Villain Award =

Indian film award

The Santosham Best Villain Award is given by Santosham Film as part of its annual Santosham Film Awards for Telugu films.

The award was first given in 2003.

| Year | Villain | Film | Ref |
|---|---|---|---|
| 2011 | Lakshmi Manchu | Anaganaga O Dheerudu |
| 2010 | Nagineedu | Maryada Ramanna |
| 2009 | Sonu Sood | Arundhati |
| 2008 | J. D. Chakravarthy | Homam |
| 2007 | Ravi Babu | Anasuya |
| 2006 | Sai Kumar | Samanyudu |
| 2005 | Sayaji Shinde | Andhrudu |
| 2004 | Pradeep Rawat | Sye |
| 2003 | Prakash Raj | Okkadu |
