= Pournami (film) =

2006 Telugu film by Prabhu Deva

- Theatrical release poster
- Directed by: Prabhu Deva
- Written by: M. S. Raju (Story & screenplay); Paruchuri Brothers (Dialogues)
- Produced by: M. S. Raju
- Starring: Prabhas; Trisha; Charmy; Sindhu Tolani; Rahul Dev
- Cinematography: Venu
- Edited by: K. V. Krishna Reddy
- Music by: Devi Sri Prasad
- Production company: Sumanth Art Productions
- Release date: 20 April 2006
- Running time: 167 minutes
- Country: India
- Language: Telugu
- Box office: ₹9 crore distributors' share

Pournami (lit. 'Full moon') is a 2006 Telugu language romantic musical action film directed by Prabhu Deva and written and produced by M. S. Raju. It stars Prabhas, Trisha in the titular role, Charmy, Sindhu Tolani, and Rahul Dev, with music composed by Devi Sri Prasad and cinematography by Venu. Set in the 1960s, the film follows Siva Kesava, a mysterious dancer who trains a young woman for a sacred dance ritual, uncovering deep ties to her family's past.

The film's script was inspired by a real-life incident that occurred four decades earlier, which was shared with M. S. Raju by director Sobhan. Raju developed it into a screenplay with the aim of blending Telugu culture and traditions with a commercially viable narrative. Script development began in February 2005, and the film was officially launched on 22 August 2005. Filming took approximately eight months, spanning 180–190 working days. Key scenes were shot at historical locations such as the Virupaksha Temple, elephant stables, and Stepwell in Hampi.

Pournami was released on 21 April 2006 and was a commercial failure. However, it won the Nandi Award for Best Art Director. The film was later dubbed into Tamil and Malayalam under the same title and into Hindi as Tridev: Pyar Ki Jung.

== Plot ==
In 1953, in a remote village in Andhra Pradesh, Subramanyam teaches dance Bharathanatiyam to his daughter, Pournami, as part of their family tradition. He recounts the story of a woman in 1507 who danced in the temple for seven days and nights to ask Lord Siva for rain during a devastating drought. The woman's sacrifice brought rain, and since then, every twelve years, a girl from her lineage performs the ritual dance in the temple. Pournami's mother performed this dance in 1951, and Pournami is expected to do the same.

In 1963, as the festival approaches, Pournami mysteriously disappears, and the villagers assume she has eloped with someone. Attention then shifts to her younger sister, Chandrakala, but their father refuses to teach her the dance. Meanwhile, their stepmother rents out their penthouse and courtyard, where Pournami used to dance, to Siva Kesava, a western-style dance instructor.

Pournami has not eloped, but her father sent her away to protect her from the local zamindar, Veerabhadra, who wants to make Pournami his concubine. Fearing that the same fate might befall Chandrakala, he declines to teach her how to dance. Kesava shows a necklace to Subramanyam, which shocks him, and then promises to protect her from the zamindar. At this, Subramanyam agrees to let Chandrakala begin her dance training.

During her training, she develops feelings for Kesava. However, Kesava reveals his past: he had married Pournami, who sacrificed herself to save his life. Before dying, she made Kesava promise that Chandrakala would perform the temple dance. After learning of her sister's fate, Chandrakala agrees to continue the tradition with her father's blessing.

Chandrakala becomes a skilled dancer, and during the festival, she performs the ritual dance. As she completes the performance, the village is once again blessed with rain. Despite Veerabhadra's interference and complications with Kesava's former fiancée, Mallika, Kesava and Chandrakala get engaged.

Years later, the couple has a daughter named Pournami, who does not want to learn the family dance. The film concludes with Kesava narrating the tradition to their daughter in the temple.

== Cast ==
- Prabhas as Siva Kesava Naidu
- Trisha as Pournami
- Charmy Kaur as Chandrakala
- Rahul Dev as Veerabhadra
- Sindhu Tolani as Mallika
- Mukesh Rishi as Narasimha Naidu
- Madhu Sharma as Mohini
- Geetha as Kesava's mother
- Kota Srinivasa Rao as Nagendra Naidu
- Paruchuri Venkateswara Rao as Peddayya
- Chandra Mohan as Subhramanyam
- Manju Bhargavi as Pournami and Chandrakala's stepmother
- Brahmanandam as Ramakrishna
- Dharmavarapu Subramanyam as Satyanarayana
- Sunil as Pandu
- Tanikella Bharani as Mallika's father
- Sana as Mallika's mother
- Veda Sastry as Pournami and Chandrakala's ancestress
- Subbaraju as Nagendra's elder son
- Brahmaji as Nagendra's middle son
- Sravan as Nagendra's youngest son
- Ajay as Chandrakala's stalker
- Harsha Vardhan as Pournami and Chandrakala's step-uncle
- Narsing Yadav as Mallika's servant
- Mallikarjuna Rao as Priest
- Prabhas Sreenu as a tea seller
- G. V. Sudhakar Naidu as a tea seller and Pournami's stalker
- Narra Venkateswara Rao as Pournami and Chandrakala's village head sarpanch
- Raja Sridhar as Narasimha Naidu's elder son

== Production ==
The script for Pournami was inspired by a real-life incident that happened four decades before the film's production, which Sobhan, the director of Varsham (2004), shared with producer and writer M. S. Raju. Raju developed the script with the intention of creating something different from regular films, drawing inspiration from period dramas like Lagaan (2001) and Gadar (2001). The work on the script started from February 2005, and the film was launched on 22 August 2005. Set in the 1960s, Raju specifically chose this period for the film's backdrop, believing it would offer a distinctive flavour to the narrative. Raju's vision for Pournami aimed to blend Telugu culture and traditions with a commercially viable format. One of the flashback portions in the film was inspired by the 2001 Brazilian film Behind the Sun, itself adapted from the 1978 Albanian novel Broken April by Ismail Kadare.

Prabhas, having previously worked with Raju in Varsham, was cast in the lead role. The female leads were portrayed by Trisha, Charmy, and Sindhu Tolani. Before the film's release, Raju acknowledged that casting Prabhas, primarily known for action roles, in a musical like Pournami was experimental. However, he believed the unique casting would result in something fresh and engaging. Paruchuri Gopala Krishna, one of the film's writers, noted that Prabhas' character was symbolically influenced by both Lord Siva and Lord Krishna, as represented by the snake and flute in his characterization. Pournami was Prabhu Deva's second directorial venture following his success with Nuvvostanante Nenoddantana (2005). While the script was developed by Raju, Prabhu Deva played a significant role in the film's execution.

Production of Pournami spanned approximately eight months, involving around 180-190 working days. The film was shot at key historical locations such as the Virupaksha Temple, elephant stables, and Stepwell in Hampi, adding an authentic period aesthetic to the film.

== Music ==
Pournami

Soundtrack album by Devi Sri Prasad
- Released: 22 March 2006
- Recorded: 2006
- Genre: Film soundtrack
- Length: 39:27
- Language: Telugu
- Label: Aditya Music
- Producer: Devi Sri Prasad

Devi Sri Prasad chronology
Aaru (2005)	Pournami (2006)	Bommarillu (2006)

The music and background score was composed by Devi Sri Prasad, and the lyrics were written by Sirivennela Sitaramasastri. The track "Bharata Vedamuga" was set in the Chandrakauns raaga. The audio was released at Film Nagar Daiva Sannidhanam, Hyderabad on 22 March 2006.

Track Listing
No.	Title	Singer(s)	Length
1.	"Bhavamaiyna"	Jaidev, Punya Srinivas (Veena), Srinivas (Jathi)	3:21
2.	"Koyo Koyo"	Shaan	4:35
3.	"Yevaro Choodali"	K. S. Chithra	4:27
4.	"Muvvala Navvakala"	K. S. Chithra, S. P. Balasubrahmanyam	5:07
5.	"Yevaro Raavali"	K. S. Chithra, Sagar	2:52
6.	"Pallakivai"	Gopika Poornima	4:45
7.	"Ichi Puchukunte"	Tippu, Sumangali	4:34
8.	"Flute Music (Instrumental)"	Kiran	2:09
9.	"Rock N Roll"	Instrumental	1:50
10.	"Bharata Vedamuga"	K. S. Chithra	5:47

== Reception ==
Jeevi of Idlebrain.com rated the film three out of five and noted, "Producer MS Raju should be appreciated to make a film that has classical dance and traditions as backdrop. Climax should have been better. The thread of main villain Rahul Dev is left incomplete." A critic from Full Hyderabad wrote, "on the whole, this isn't something that is worth the 3 hours it demands."

== Awards ==
Ashok won the 2006 Nandi Award for Best Art Director for his work on Pournami.
