= Sathruvu =

- Theatrical poster
- Directed by: Kodi Ramakrishna
- Screenplay by: Kodi Ramakrishna; G. Satyamurthy (dialogue)
- Produced by: M. S. Raju
- Starring: Venkatesh; Vijayashanti; Kota Srinivasa Rao
- Cinematography: S. Gopal Reddy
- Edited by: Suresh Tata
- Music by: Raj–Koti
- Production company: Sumanth Art Productions
- Release date: 2 January 1991
- Running time: 140 minutes
- Country: India
- Language: Telugu

Sathruvu (transl. Nemesis) is a 1991 Indian Telugu-language crime thriller film directed by Kodi Ramakrishna and produced by M. S. Raju under Sumanth Art Productions. It stars Venkatesh, Vijayashanti, and Kota Srinivasa Rao with music composed by Raj–Koti.

Released on 2 January 1991, the film received positive reviews and was successful at the box office. The film was remade in Kannada as Nanna Shathru (1992) and in Hindi as Vijeta (1996).

== Plot ==
Ashok is an advocate who works as a junior along with his two friends Raghava and Bhaskar for advocate Durga Prasad, who always fights for Justice. Durga Prasad and his wife Lakshmi treat them as their own children. Venkataratnam is a powerful contractor who has the entire system in his hands. Once, Venkataratnam cheats the Govt. by saying that he has constructed the hostel for poor people without doing it, just showing it on papers. Durga Prasad takes up the case and gathers all the proofs against him. Venkataratnam threatens Durga Prasad a lot who does not yield to it. Finally, Venkataratnam kills Durga Prasad and his wife Lakshmi in front of the court and destroys all the evidence. Before dying, Durga Prasad takes a word from Ashok, that he should win this case under any circumstances. Ashok gives respect to his words and takes up the case, but he fails to get the case admitted because there is no evidence. In that frustration, Ashok reacts on Venkataratnam publicly in court. Finally, he is suspended from the court and arrested.

Now Ashok decides to take revenge against Venkataratnam and his gang. He eliminates Venkataratnam's men one by one which creates fear to Venkataratnam. So he sends his henchmen DIG Prakash Rao to hand over the case to ACP Vijaya, who was none other than Ashok's lover in his college days. Both of them challenge each other. Ashok challenges to complete his mission, while Vijaya challenges that she will stop him under any circumstance. During the process, Vijaya finds out that DIG works for Venkataratnam and collects all the proof for Venkatratnam's arrest. When she gets ready to arrest them, they plan to kill her. Ashok comes to her rescue and eliminates Venkataratnam and his entire gang. Finally, Ashok successfully completes his mission and the movie ends.

== Cast ==
- Venkatesh as Ex Advocate Ashok
- Vijayashanti as ACP Vijaya
- Kota Srinivasa Rao as Venkataratnam
- Captain Raju as DIG Prakash Rao
- Vijay Kumar as Durga Prasad
- Jaya Prakash Reddy as Mayor Gowdappa
- Anand Raj as Satya Murthy
- Babu Antony as Jorge
- Maharshi Raghava as Raghava
- Nagesh as Contestable Ramayah
- Brahmanandam as Contestable Sambayah
- Babu Mohan as House Owner
- P. L. Narayana as Major Michel (Chintu's grandfather)
- Sangeetha as Lakshmi (Durga Prasad's wife)
- Kalpana Rai as House Owner's Wife
- Master Satish as Chintu

== Production ==
M. S. Raju provided the basic story idea of the film and he chose Satya Murthy as the writer and together worked to develop the story line. The team hired Vijaya Shanti as heroine. During the making of the film, Vijayashanti had the film Karthavyam. Venky had two other films - Dhruva Nakshatram and Bobbili Raja - released at the same time. Initially, Kodi Rama Krishna opted for a newcomer for Kota's character, but Raju convinced Kodi Rama Krishna to take Kota for that character.

== Soundtrack ==
Sathruvu

Film score by Raj–Koti
- Released: 1990
- Genre: Soundtrack
- Length: 21:54
- Label: CAUVERY Audio Company
- Producer: Raj–Koti

Raj–Koti chronology
Raja Vikramarka (1990)	Sathruvu (1990)	Iddaru Iddare (1990)

Music composed by Raj–Koti. Music released on CAUVERY Audio Company.

No.	Title	Lyrics	Singer(s)	Length
1.	"Amma Sampangi Reku"	Sirivennela Sitarama Sastry	S. P. Balasubrahmanyam, Chitra	4:44
2.	"Chey Chey"	Veturi	S. P. Balasubrahmanyam, Chitra	4:59
3.	"Maata Vintara"	Veturi	Mano, Chitra	4:13
4.	"Produnne Puttindi"	Sirivennela Sitarama Sastry	S. P. Balasubrahmanyam, Chitra	3:56
5.	"Yamathakidi"	Veturi	S. P. Balasubrahmanyam, Chitra	4:02
Total length:				21:54
