= Manasantha Nuvve =

2001 film by V. N. Aditya

- Poster
- Directed by: V. N. Aditya
- Screenplay by: Paruchuri Brothers
- Story by: M. S. Raju
- Produced by: M. S. Raju
- Starring: Uday Kiran; Reema Sen
- Cinematography: S. Gopal Reddy
- Edited by: K. V. Krishna Reddy
- Music by: R. P. Patnaik
- Production company: Sumanth Art Productions
- Release date: 19 October 2001
- Running time: 144 min
- Country: India
- Language: Telugu
- Box office: ₹18 crore distributors' share

Manasantha Nuvve (transl. My heart is full of/with you) is a 2001 Indian Telugu-language romantic drama film directed by V. N. Aditya. The film stars Uday Kiran and Reema Sen in the lead roles. It was written and produced by M. S. Raju with music composed by R. P. Patnaik.

The film released on 19 October 2001 and became one of the biggest hits of the year in Telugu cinema. Owing to its success, the film was remade in Kannada as Manasella Neene (2002), in Hindi as Jeena Sirf Merre Liye (2002) and in Tamil as Thithikudhe (2003).

== Plot ==
The film begins with two childhood friends living in a village at Araku Valley. Anu is the daughter of a wealthy government officer. Chanti, son of a widowed mother, lives in a small hut beside their house. Anu is attracted to the kindness of Chanti and they both become friends. Anu's father does not like their friendship, but they continue playing together. One day, Anu's father gets a job transfer and they leave to Vizag. Before leaving, Anu gives Chanti a musical alarm clock as a parting gift when they leave to Vizag. He keeps this gift as a token of her remembrance.

After some time, his mother dies because of a disease and he is an orphan now. He starts selling breakfast to the railway passengers and tries to make a living of it. One day, a kind couple, Mohan Rao and Sudha with their little daughter Rekha, impressed by his honesty, decide to adopt him and give him a good life. They give him a new name Venu and bring him up as their eldest child. He looks after their Audio/Video café run by Mohan Rao. Anu goes to Malaysia and completes her education, but she still remembers her childhood friend Chanti. Her parents want her to marry her cousin, but she convinces them that she does not want to marry now. She also reveals to her cousin that she still likes Chanti and hopes to meet him someday.

She comes to India in the hope of finding Chanti, but fails to meet him. She starts writing about their friendship since their childhood in a serial and visits the editor of Swati magazine and tells him that this is her own story, Manasantha Nuvve. He is impressed by the story and agrees to publish it in his magazine with her pen name Renu. Venu's sister becomes a big fan of that serial and admires her. She keeps asking Venu to find her and get her home.

One day, Renu is invited to a stage show where Venu also reveals the story and the love of his childhood friend Anu. Renu becomes happy that she found him, but wanted to give him a thrill by not revealing her identity. She introduces herself to him as Renu, the writer of the serial Manasantha Nuvve. He feels happy that he can take her to his sister and surprise her. Renu visits their home and she becomes a good family friend. She also teases and plays with Venu without revealing who she really is. After reading her serial, Venu happily discovers that Renu is Anu and asks her to come somewhere for their surprise visit.

Unfortunately, Anu's father ruined their future happiness by telling him about the wedding of Anu and the minister's son before that and tells him to forget his daughter or else he will spoil his sister's marriage (which will be on the same day as Anu's wedding). He agrees to his proposal and fears his sister's life so he makes Anu hate him by lying that he is in love with Renu and is not waiting for and not loving Anu. Anu is shocked and sad.

On the day of Venu's sister's marriage and Anu's marriage, Anu finds out that Venu already knows that Renu is Anu and that her father is the reason for their breakup and spoils her own marriage with a minister's son and told Venu that if he comes in her way then he will spoil his sister's marriage. After knowing the truth and Venu's true love towards Anu, Anu now rushes to Venu. Venu fights off Anu's father's henchmen in a rage but is wounded by the last one and enters a coma. Finally, he recuperates from the coma after listening to the alarm sound given by Anu in their childhood and the couple unites. The couple's family and friends agree with their love.

== Cast ==
- Uday Kiran as Chanti (Venu)
- Reema Sen as Anu (Renu) (Voice by Savitha Reddy)
- Tanu Roy as Shruthi (voiced by Sunitha)
- Shiju as Anu's friend
- Paruchuri Venkateswara Rao as Sivaram, editor of Swati weekly and Shruthi's father
- Chandra Mohan as Mohan Rao, Venu/Chanti's Adopted Father
- Tanikella Bharani as Anu's father
- Shiva Parvathi as Anu's mother
- Bramhanandam as Daya
- Sunil as Sunil, Venu's friend
- Sudha as Chanti/Venu's Adopted mother Mohan's wife
- Sireesha as Mohan's daughter
- Devadas Kanakala as minister
- Shiva Reddy as Minister's son
- Pavala Shyamala as Mohan Rao's mother
- Rajitha as Mohan's friend
- Kaushal Manda as Eve teaser
- Sirivennela Seetharama Sastry as himself
- Aanand Vardhan as young Chanti
- Baby Zeeba as young Renu
- Sagar as a speaker at the Friendship day event

== Production ==
V. N. Aditya, who earlier assisted directors like Jayanth C. Paranjee and Singeetham Srinivasa Rao, made his directorial debut with this film. M. S. Raju said that he did this film with relatively new director and a new actor as per the recommendation of S. Gopal Reddy after the dud of Deviputrudu (2001). Mahesh Babu was initially offered the lead role.

== Soundtrack ==
The soundtrack consists of eight songs composed by R. P. Patnaik. All lyrics were written by Sirivennela Seetharama Sastry. All the tracks were popular.

The song "Cheppave Prema" is inspired by American singer Cher's "Dov'è l'amore" (1999) from the album Believe. The song "Tuneega Tuneega" became a hit. It was re-arranged from Vidyasagar's original composition "Kannadi Koodum Kootti" from Pranayavarnangal (1998).

Track Listing
No.	Title	Singer(s)	Length
1.	"Toonega Toonega"	Usha, Sanjeevani	4:23
2.	"Cheppave Prema"	R. P. Patnaik, Usha	5:17
3.	"Kita Kita Thalupulu"	K. S. Chithra	4:50
4.	"Nee Sneham"	R. P. Patnaik, Usha	2:57
5.	"Dhin Dhin Dhinaka"	Mahalaxmi Iyer	3:24
6.	"Manasanta Nuvve"	S. P. Charan, Sujatha	4:41
7.	"Aakasana"	KK, Sujatha	4:09
8.	"Evarini Eppudu"	KK	1:27

== Release ==
=== Reception ===
A critic from Sify wrote that "On the whole a romantic film which peters out to be another melodrama". Jeevi of Idlebrain.com rated the film 3 1/4 out of 5.

=== Box office ===
With Manasantha Nuvve, Uday Kiran had scored back-to-back successes along with Chitram (2000) and Nuvvu Nenu (2001).
