= 7 Days 6 Nights =

2022 film by M. S. Raju

- Theatrical release poster
- Directed by: M. S. Raju
- Written by: M. S. Raju
- Produced by: Sumanth Ashwin; S. Rajanikant
- Starring: Sumanth Ashwin; Meher Chahal; Rohan; Kritika Shetty
- Cinematography: Nani Chamidisetty
- Edited by: Junaid Siddique
- Music by: Samarth Gollapudi
- Production companies: Wild Honey Production; Wintage Pictures; ABG Creations
- Distributed by: Sumanth Art Productions
- Release date: 24 June 2022
- Country: India
- Language: Telugu

7 Days 6 Nights is a 2022 Indian Telugu-language coming-of-age romantic comedy film written and directed by M. S. Raju. The film features Sumanth Ashwin, Meher Chahal, Rohan M and Kritika Shetty in primary roles. 7 Days 6 Nights was released on 24 June 2022.

== Plot ==
Anand and Mangalam, friends with different mindsets travel to Goa on a Bachelors Trip. They meet 2 young girls and Mangalam falls in love. Anand tries to stop Mangalam, as he's already engaged. What's next makes the fun-filled story.

== Cast ==
- Sumanth Ashwin as Anand
- Meher Chahal as Rathika
- Rohan M as Mangalam
- Kritika Shetty as Ameya
- Rishika Bali as Vinni
- Sushma
- Goparaju Ramana
- Junaid Siddique
- Murali Krishna
- Pramila
- Imran
- Charan
- Krishna Teja
- Pratyusha
- Vijay Kumar
- Naresh (voice)

== Production ==
The film was officially announced in May 2021 coinciding with the birthday of M. S. Raju. Speaking to 10TV, Sumanth said that the filming will begin in June 2021. The film was shot extensively in Udupi and Mangalore of Karnataka and Goa. In an interview with Sakshi, Raju revealed that 1949 Hindi film Barsaat was an inspiration for this film. Sumanth Ashwin's character is designed on the basis of Raj Kapoor's role in Barsaat.

== Soundtrack ==
The film's soundtrack and score is composed by Samarth Gollapudi.

Track listing
No.	Title	Lyrics	Singer(s)	Length
1.	"Let Me Go There"	Krishna Kanth, Samarth Gollapudi	Nutana Mohan, Samarth Gollapudi	2:36
2.	"Take Me"	Krishna Kanth, Samarth Gollapudi	Samarth Gollapudi, Sanjana Udayagiri	3:25
3.	"Chinna Zindagi"	Krishna Kanth	Prudhvi Chandra	3:06

== Release ==
After RRR postponed its release date, several films including 7 Days 6 Nights were planned to release on 14 January 2022. The film was then postponed and theatrically released on 24 June 2022.

== Reception ==
The Times of India gave a rating of 3 out of 5 and stated that "The movie's first half breezes effortlessly - the hangover humour, fantastic visuals, a bit of father-son bond, and the car journey to Goa keep the viewers entertained. However, while still engaging in parts, the second half suffers a slight drag and monotony in the characters' mannerisms". NTV in their review opined that dialogues and duration are film's plus points, whereas slow-pace narration, story and screenplay are film's negative factors.
