= Nandi Awards of 1996 =

Indian Telugu film and TV awards ceremony

Nandi Awards presented annually by Government of Andhra Pradesh. First awarded in 1964.

== 1996 Nandi Awards Winners List ==
Category	Winner	Film
Best Feature Film	Muthyala Subbaiah	Pavitra Bandham
Second Best Feature Film	Gangaraju Gunnam	Little Soldiers
Third Best Feature Film	C. Umamaheswara Rao	Srikaram
