= Veeru Potla =

Indian film director and screenwriter

- Born: Janapadu, Piduguralla, Guntur district, Andhra Pradesh
- Occupations: Director, writer
- Years active: 2004–present

Veeru Potla is an Indian film director and screenwriter who works primarily in Telugu cinema. He is known for directing film such as Bindaas and Ragada and writing story for Varsham and Nuvvostanante Nenoddantana.

== Personal life ==
Veeru Potla was born in Piduguralla, Guntur district, Andhra Pradesh into a farmer's family. He completed his secondary & higher education in Piduguralla.He studied in A P Residential School, Tadikonda (APRST) from 1982 to 1986). Potla's interest in film brought him to Hyderabad, India, where he started his career as a screenwriter. He married a girl from a family with no film experience in Rajahmundry. Potla has said that he admires directors K.Viswanath & Woody Allen.

== Career ==
Veeru Potla made his debut in 2004 as a screenwriter with the film, Varsham, which starred Prabhas and Trisha and in 2005, Nuvvostanante Nenoddantana, starring Siddharth and Trisha directed by Prabhu Deva. In 2010 he directed Bindaas, starring Manoj Manchu and Ragada, starring Nagarjuna. Both of the films he directed received positive reviews. His latest venture, Doosukeltha starring Vishnu Manchu gained positive reviews and declared as a Hit at Boxoffice.

== Filmography ==
Year	Film	Writer	Director	Notes
2004	Varsham	Story	No	
2005	Nuvvostanante Nenoddantana	Story	No	
2010	Bindaas	Yes	Yes	
2010	Ragada	Yes	Yes	
2013	Doosukeltha	Yes	Yes	
2016	Eedu Gold Ehe	Yes	Yes	
