= Okkadu =

2003 Indian film by Gunasekhar

- Theatrical release poster
- Directed by: Gunasekhar
- Written by: Story & Screenplay: Gunasekhar; Dialogues: Paruchuri Brothers
- Produced by: M. S. Raju
- Starring: Mahesh Babu; Bhumika Chawla; Prakash Raj
- Cinematography: Sekhar V. Joseph
- Edited by: A. Sreekar Prasad
- Music by: Mani Sharma
- Production company: Sumanth Art Productions
- Release date: 15 January 2003
- Running time: 171 minutes
- Country: India
- Language: Telugu
- Box office: ₹25-30 crores distributors' share

Okkadu (transl. One person) is a 2003 Indian Telugu-language romantic sports action drama film co-written and directed by Gunasekhar and produced by M. S. Raju. The film stars Mahesh Babu, Bhumika Chawla and Prakash Raj. The music was composed by Mani Sharma, while the cinematography and editing were handled by Sekhar V. Joseph and A. Sreekar Prasad. In the film, Ajay, a fiery Kabaddi player from Hyderabad, visits Kurnool for a tournament and rescues Swapna from a faction leader, Obul Reddy, who wants to marry her by force. As Ajay hides her and helps plan her escape abroad, a violent feud erupts, leading to love, loss, and a final showdown.

Okkadu was released on 15 January 2003 to critical acclaim. The film received praise for its acting, action sequences, and direction and went on to become a commercial success at the box office with a distributors' share of ₹25-30 crore. It became Mahesh Babu's first commercial breakout in his career. It has garnered eight Nandi Awards and four Filmfare Awards South, including Best Film– Telugu.

Over the years, the film was remade in eight other languages: as Ghilli (2004) in Tamil, as Ajay (2006) in Kannada, twice in Bangladesh as Dapot (2006) and Bolona Kobul (2009), as Mate Aanidela Lakhe Phaguna (2008) in Odia, and as Tevar (2015) in Hindi, and as Kabaddi (2021) in Sinhala.

== Plot ==
Ajay Varma, a hot headed Hyderabad-based kabaddi player, a UPSC aspirant and the son of DCP Vijay Varma, visits Kurnool to take part in a state-level tournament. In Kurnool, Ajay saves Swapna Reddy from Obul Reddy, a dangerous faction leader who is in love with Swapna and wants to marry her against her wishes. Ajay learns that Swapna is trying to leave for the US to live with her uncle and pursue her studies after Obul killed her two elder brothers over their disapproval of a marriage alliance on account of the age gap.

In the process of saving Swapna, Ajay humiliates Obul by pushing him into a mud pond. Obul refuses to cleanse the mud until Swapna is found and brought back. Ajay takes Swapna to his house in the Old City and hides her in his room with the help of his sister, Asha, while he and his friends work to get her a Visa and passport. However, Ajay's parents learn about Swapna hiding in their house. Swapna escapes with Ajay and eventually falls in love with him. The next day, Vijay and his gang of friends surround the Charminar, where Swapna is hidden. Swapna, Ajay, and his friends reach Begumpet Airport. They also brought Swapna's parents to see her one last time. Meanwhile, all facts were known to Obul Reddy through Ajay's kabaddi rivals, the "Soda gang," then Obul Reddy warns Vijay at his home for not finding his son and Swapna.

However, with hard struggle, Ajay successfully makes Swapna pass airport security, and then Ajay realizes that he loves Swapna, who later shows up and hugs him while proposing to him. But then, Vijay arrests Ajay, while Obul's men take Swapna away.

Later, Swapna taunts Obul, who tries to molest her, but she defends herself by telling that Ajay will definitely come for her and challenges him to defeat Ajay to get her. Obul goes to the prison and asks Ajay to come with him by Vijay's approval as a result of withdrawing his case. Vijay expresses that he is not worried about Ajay but is worried about Obul. Obul attempts to kill Ajay again but realizes that it is a trap set by Ajay and his gang, and later, Obul and his henchmen are abducted by Ajay. Later, Ajay and his friends attend the finals of the national-level kabaddi tournament and win the tournament. Meanwhile, Obul has escaped through Soda gang and called forces to kill Ajay.

Obul's elder brother Home Minister Siva Reddy is waiting at the venue of Obul's marriage with Swapna. After learning about his whereabouts, Siva reaches the stadium, along with Swapna and his mother. Ajay and Obul battle with each other, while Obul's mother gets killed in a bomb blast by her dog (after attempting to kill Ajay at the stadium). Finally, Ajay defeats Obul. Later, Obul regains his consciousness to kill Ajay, but Swapna's father, Dhasaratharami Reddy, stabs him to death before he can strike. Siva Reddy decides not to react as it would harm his position. Ajay and his friends celebrate their victory with Swapna and her family. Later, both Ajay and Swapna get married.

== Cast ==
- Mahesh Babu as Ajay Varma
- Bhumika Chawla as Swapna Reddy
- Prakash Raj as Obul Reddy, a dreaded gangster and Swapna's obsessive lover
- Mukesh Rishi as DCP Vijay Varma IPS, Ajay's father
- Paruchuri Venkateswara Rao as Doondi
- Chandra Mohan as Dhasaratharami Reddy, Swapna's father
- Rajan P. Dev as Siva Reddy, Home Minister and Obul Reddy's brother
- Geetha as Vasundhara Varma, Ajay's mother
- Telangana Shakuntala as Shakuntala, Obul Reddy's mother
- Niharika as Asha Varma "Lolipop", Ajay's sister
- Ajay as Kumar, Ajay's friend
- Brahmanandam as Satyanarayana
- Dharmavarapu Subramanyam as Subramanyam, a passport officer
- Achyuth as Swapna's elder brother
- M. S. Narayana as Narayana, priest
- Gundu Hanumantha Rao as assistant priest
- G. V. Sudhakar Naidu as Obul Reddy's rival

== Production ==
=== Development ===
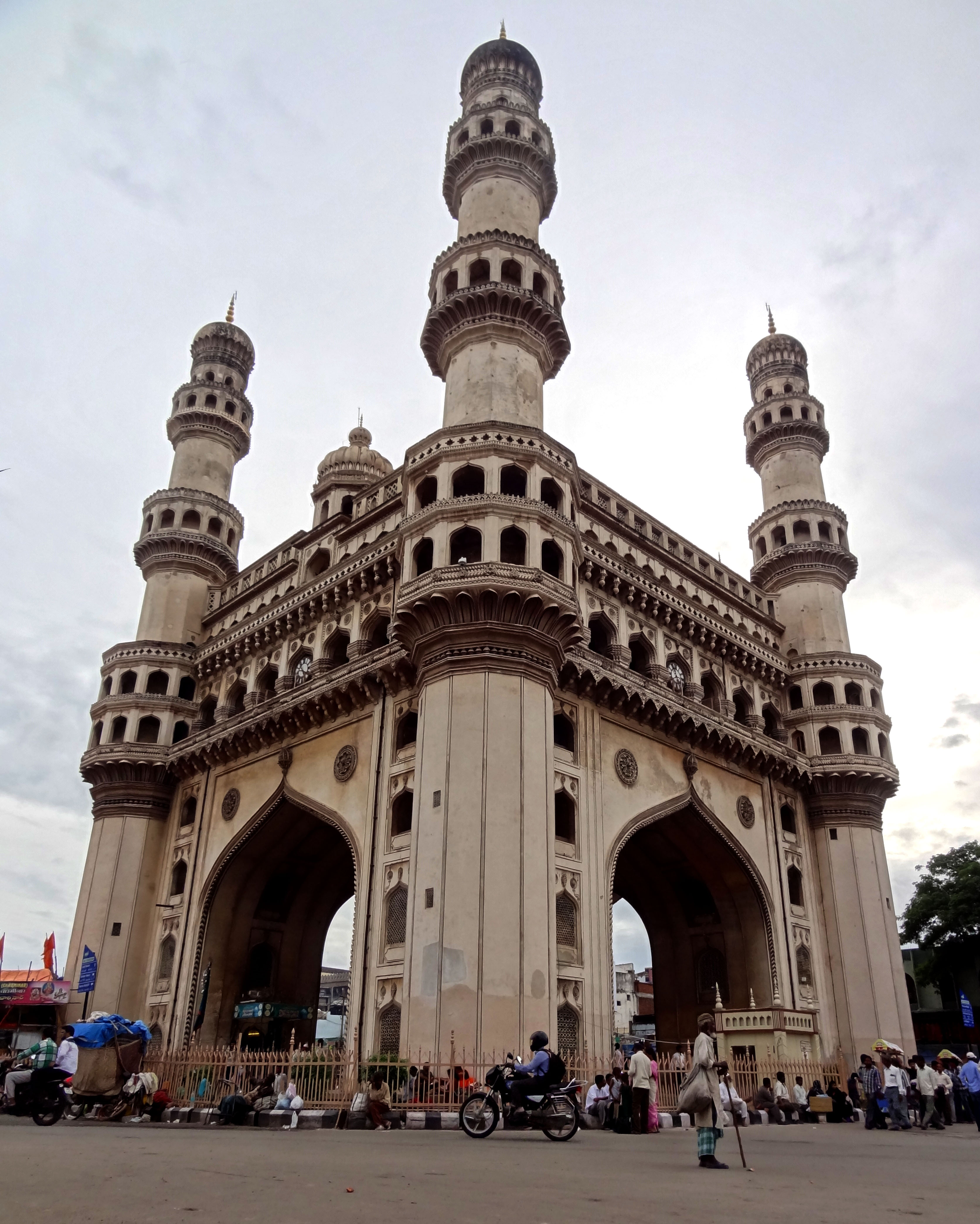
Gunasekhar chose Charminar (pictured), a monument and mosque located in Hyderabad as the film's backdrop.

During his days as an assistant director in Madras (now Chennai), Gunasekhar dreamt of directing a film with the backdrop of Charminar, a monument and mosque located in Hyderabad. After watching West Side Story (1961), he took inspiration from the war between two gangs and wrote a script choosing Charminar and Old city area of Hyderabad as the film's backdrop. Years later, Aswini Dutt met Gunasekhar during the re-recording sessions of Choodalani Vundi (1998) where the latter saw the portfolio images of Mahesh Babu whose debut film Rajakumarudu (1999) was officially launched that day. Finding Mahesh Babu apt for the protagonist he envisioned, Gunasekhar narrated the script to him and gained his consent.

After the release of Mrugaraju (2001), Gunasekhar resumed work on the film's script. After reading an interview of Pullela Gopichand who pursued a career in badminton against his father's wishes and faced many hardships, Gunasekhar made the protagonist a person who aspires to be a kabaddi player against his father's wishes. He met Ramoji Rao who expressed his wish to produce the film and permitted Gunasekhar to erect a Charminar set at Ramoji Film City.

Ramoji Rao walked out for unknown reasons and Mahesh Babu, along with Gunasekhar, met M. S. Raju at Padmalaya Studios office. Mahesh Babu asked Raju to permit them to erect a Charminar set as they cannot avail police permission to shoot at the original after a person committed suicide by jumping from the top. Raju agreed to do so after listening to the script narration and the project was subsequently announced.

Gunasekhar wanted to name the film as Athade Ame Sainyam (transl. He is her army), but the title was already registered for another film which made Gunasekhar name the film as Okkadu after considering Kabaddi. The film was produced under the banner Sumanth Art Productions with a budget of ₹8–9 crore.

=== Cast and crew ===
Impressed with her screen presence in Yuvakudu (2000), Gunasekhar chose Bhumika Chawla as the film's female lead to be paired with Mahesh Babu. Mukesh Rishi and Geetha were signed to play Mahesh Babu's parents in the film. The former called it a character close to his heart, calling it is a "soft role after a string of ferocious roles that I have played". Prakash Raj was signed as the antagonist and was seen as a factionist who falls for Bhumika's character in the film. Telangana Shakuntala played the role of Prakash Raj's mother in the film for which she had to smoke a cigar. Chandra Mohan and Niharika were seen in supporting roles as Bhumika's father and Mahesh Babu's sister respectively.

Paruchuri Brothers were signed to write the film's dialogues. Mani Sharma composed the score and Sekhar V. Joseph was its cinematographer. A. Sreekar Prasad edited the film, and Ashok Kumar was its art director. Sreekar Prasad called it a difficult film as it went through many forms of narration and he found it challenging to keep the pace very fast to make it slick and engaging. After the first copy was ready, Paruchuri Brothers suggested to Gunasekhar that a linear narrative be opted for over the non linear narrative. The latter, along with Sreekar Prasad, changed the non-linear narration to linear, within ten minutes.

=== Filming ===
The film's unit erected the Charminar set in the ten acres of land owned by D. Ramanaidu at Gopannapalle near Hyderabad. The original height of Charminar is 176 feet (54 m) and the height of each minaret is 78 feet (24 m) feet. The film's unit decided to construct the set with a length of 120 feet (37 m) feet by not altering the minarets and instead reduce the total length of the remaining part. The surroundings of Charminar were recreated in five acres around the set. 300 workers were employed in the construction of the set which lasted for three months and costed ₹1.75 crore.

The makers decided to create the roads near the set using computer graphics in order to reduce the budget. Principal photography began in the same set and fifteen generators were used for illuminating the area. Strada Cranes were used for filming key scenes after ordinary cranes proved to be futile. The film's climax was shot in December 2002 for 11 days and 1000 junior artistes participated in the film's shoot amid extreme climatic conditions. Despite receiving training in kabaddi, Mahesh Babu was injured several times during the film's shoot.

== Soundtrack ==
Okkadu

Soundtrack album to Okkadu by Mani Sharma
- Released: 19 Dec 2002
- Recorded: 2002
- Genre: Feature film soundtrack
- Language: Telugu
- Label: Aditya Music
- Producer: Mani Sharma

The music for the film was composed by Mani Sharma and the lyrics were written by Sirivennela Seetharama Sastry.

Track List
No.	Title	Singer(s)	Length
1.	"Hare Rama"	Shankar Mahadevan	5:57
2.	"Nuvvem Maya"	Shreya Ghoshal	4:02
3.	"Cheppave Chirugali"	Udit Narayan, Sujatha	5:30
4.	"Hay Rey Hai"	Karthik, K. S. Chithra	5:05
5.	"Attarintiki"	Hariharan, Shreya Ghoshal, Priya Sisters	5:57
6.	"Sahasam"	Mallikharjun	5:03
Total length:			31:38

== Release and reception ==
The film was released on 15 January 2003 in 165 screens. The audio was released on 19 December 2002. The film earned a distributor's share of ₹25−30 crore.

Home media

Okkadu was available to stream on SUN Nxt.

Sify wrote, "Finally Mahesh Babu has managed to get the right mix and make Okkadu, a live-wire action thriller. Paruchuri brothers and director Guna Sekhar have made it racy and Mani Sharma has dished out some memorable tunes". Idlebrain wrote, "First half of the film is very good. Second half is good. The narration has become slow in the second half. But keeping in mind that there is only one thread (Mahesh sending Bhumika to USA) to be narrated, we can't expect a better second half. All the scenes that happen in Mahesh Babu's house provide lot of entertainment with subtle comedy. Mahesh Babu deserves an outstanding blockbuster and Okkadu has all the ingredients to become one".

== Remakes ==
Okkadu was remade in Tamil as Ghilli (2004) and in Kannada as Ajay (2006), both featuring Prakash Raj reprising his role. The film was also remade in Odia as Mote Anidela Lakhe Phaguna (2008), in Bangladesh Bengali as Bolona Kobul (2009), in Hindi as Tevar (2015) and in Sinhala as Kabaddi (2021).

== Awards ==
Ceremony	Category	Nominee	Result	Ref(s)
Nandi Awards	Best Feature Film (Silver)	M. S. Raju	Won	
Nandi Awards	Best Director	Gunasekhar	Won	
Nandi Awards	Best Music Director	Mani Sharma	Won	
Nandi Awards	Best Cinematographer	Sekhar V. Joseph	Won	
Nandi Awards	Best Editor	A. Sreekar Prasad	Won	
Nandi Awards	Best Art Director	Ashok Koralath	Won	
Nandi Awards	Best Choreographer	Raju Sundaram	Won	
Nandi Awards	Best Fight Master	FEFSI Vijayan	Won	
51st Filmfare Awards South	Best Film – Telugu	M. S. Raju	Won	
51st Filmfare Awards South	Best Director – Telugu	Gunasekhar	Won	
51st Filmfare Awards South	Best Actor – Telugu	Mahesh Babu	Won	
51st Filmfare Awards South	Best Music Director – Telugu	Mani Sharma	Won	
51st Filmfare Awards South	Best Villain	Prakash Raj	Nominated	
Santosham Film Awards	Best Film	M. S. Raju	Won	
Santosham Film Awards	Best Villain	Prakash Raj	Won	
Santosham Film Awards	Best Art Direction	Ashok Kumar	Won	
Santosham Film Awards	Best publicity designer	Ramesh Varma	Won	
Santosham Film Awards	Best Supporting Actress	Telangana Shakuntala	Won	
CineMAA Awards	Best Actor	Mahesh Babu	Won	
CineMAA Awards	Best Director	Gunasekhar	Won	
CineMAA Awards	Best Music Director	Mani Sharma	Won	
CineMAA Awards	Best Cinematographer	Sekhar V. Joseph	Won	
CineMAA Awards	Best Art Director	Ashok Kumar	Won	
CineMAA Awards	Best Lyricist	Sirivennela Sitaramasastri	Won	
CineMAA Awards	Best Dialogue Writer	Paruchuri Brothers	Won	
AP Cinegoers' Association 34th Annual Awards	Best Film	M. S. Raju	Won	
AP Cinegoers' Association 34th Annual Awards	Best Actor	Mahesh Babu	Won	
AP Cinegoers' Association 34th Annual Awards	Best Director	Gunasekhar	Won	
AP Cinegoers' Association 34th Annual Awards	Best Villain	Prakash Raj	Won	
AP Cinegoers' Association 34th Annual Awards	Best Screenplay	Gunasekhar	Won	
AP Cinegoers' Association 34th Annual Awards	Best Fight Master	FEFSI Vijayan	Won	

== Sources ==
- Chinnarayana, Pulagam (16 August 2015). సినిమా వెనుక స్టోరీ: అతడే ఆమె సైన్యం [Behind the scenes: He is her army] (in Telugu). Sakshi Funday. Archived from the original on 8 December 2015.

Awards
Preceded by Santosham	Filmfare Best Film Award; 2003	Succeeded by Varsham
