= Devi Putrudu =

2001 Telugu film directed by Kodi Ramakrishna

- Movie poster
- Directed by: Kodi Ramakrishna
- Screenplay by: Kodi Ramakrishna
- Story by: Sumanth Art Productions
- Dialogue by: Jonnavithhula Ramalingeswara Rao
- Produced by: M. S. Raju
- Starring: Venkatesh; Soundarya; Anjala Zaveri
- Cinematography: S. Gopal Reddy
- Edited by: Suresh Tata
- Music by: Mani Sharma
- Production company: Sumanth Art Productions
- Release date: 14 January 2001
- Running time: 162 minutes
- Country: India
- Language: Telugu
- Budget: ₹15 crore

Devi Putrudu (transl. Son of Devi) is a 2001 Indian Telugu-language fantasy-drama film co-written and directed by Kodi Ramakrishna. It was produced by M. S. Raju under Sumanth Art Productions banner. It stars Venkatesh, Soundarya and Anjala Zaveri, with music composed by Mani Sharma. The film was not commercially successful. It was dubbed and released into Tamil as Paapa and in Hindi as Aaj Ka Deviputra.

== Plot ==
The film begins with an explanation of the submersion of Dwaraka by a tsunami, setting the stage for the story 5,000 years later. The plot introduces Gajjala Baburao, also known as Baburao (Venkatesh), who lives in Mumbai, surviving through petty thefts and pranks. Meanwhile, Satyavathi (Anjala Zaveri), a foreign-returned woman, visits India to see her sister, Karuna, who married an archaeologist and resides near the archaeological site of Dwaraka. Upon arriving in Bombay, Satyavathi and her uncle Peddagaddala Perayya hire a taxi driven by Baburao, who initially believes Satyavathi is carrying valuable diamonds. Realizing his mistake, Baburao plans to abandon her, but circumstances force him to travel to Dwaraka.

In Dwaraka, Baburao encounters a group of goons and narrowly escapes. He then meets a mysterious young girl named Paapa, who possesses mystical powers. Paapa reveals to Baburao that he has fallen in love with Satyavathi and encourages him to confess his feelings. Satyavathi later shares with Baburao that her sister Karuna has gone missing, prompting Baburao to investigate the mystery. As Baburao delves deeper, he discovers the eerie circumstances surrounding Karuna's disappearance.

The story then shifts to a flashback about Balaram (Venkatesh), an atheist and archaeologist who prioritizes science over faith. Balaram falls in love with Karuna, and they marry. While working near Dwaraka, Balaram becomes intrigued by a mysterious phenomenon in the sea that occurs every Mahalaya Amavasya, generating a powerful torque. Determined to uncover the truth, Balaram dives into the sea during one such event and retrieves an ancient metal box marked with a Trisulam (trident). Unbeknownst to him, a group of foreign mercenaries led by Rahul Dev is seeking the box for its mystical powers.

Balaram soon realizes the box contains a powerful force that could potentially destroy the world if not returned to its rightful place. The mercenaries, determined to harness this power, capture Balaram and Karuna, torturing them to reveal the box's location. Balaram manages to retrieve the box, but during a frantic attempt to save his wife, the box falls into a cave. Balaram returns to confront the mercenaries but is betrayed by his friend Hara Gopal (Suresh), who has allied with them. In the ensuing conflict, Balaram is killed, but not before he tells Karuna where to find the box and instructs her to return it to its original location.

Back in the present, Baburao vows to avenge Balaram's death and rescue Karuna from the foreign mercenaries. With the help of Paapa, he locates the cave where the box fell. A final confrontation ensues as the mercenaries attempt to escape with the box. However, Paapa intervenes, using her powers to stop them. The mercenaries enlist the help of a Fakir to trap Paapa in a bottle, but Baburao manages to push the mercenaries and the box off a cliff. The mercenaries survive, leading to a struggle for control of the box.

As the box opens, a fierce goddess emerges, killing the mercenaries and their followers before returning to the box. Baburao, along with others, ensures the box is placed back in its rightful location. In the aftermath, the bottle containing Paapa is retrieved by a dog named Striker, but Paapa’s spirit ascends to the afterlife. The film concludes with Baburao and Satyavathi welcoming the birth of their child, who bears the same birthmark as Paapa, symbolizing her spiritual connection to their family.

== Cast ==
- Venkatesh as Balaram (Archaeologist) & Gajjela Baburao (Petty Thief in Mumbai) (Dual role)
- Soundarya as Karuna
- Anjala Zaveri as Satyavati
- Suresh as Hara Gopal
- Kota Srinivasa Rao as Dheyyala Raju (Wizard)
- M. S. Narayana as Peddagaddala Perayya
- Ali as Baburao's aide.
- Babu Mohan as Security Guard
- Ahuti Prasad as Elchuri
- Raghunatha Reddy as Satyavati's father
- Nawab Shah as St. Ohm
- Prema as Goddess
- Abu Salim
- Bhupinder Singh
- Madhu
- Bank Vijay
- Raman Punjabi
- Echuri
- K. R. J. Sarma
- Indu Anand
- Baby Cherri as Balaram's daughter

== Production ==
The film was launched on 23 September 1999. In an interview with Idlebrain.com, M. S. Raju discussed the challenges of making Devi Putrudu. Following the success of Devi (1999), Raju cast Venkatesh as the lead for this ambitious project. Deeply passionate about the story, Raju decided to proceed with the film, although he later noted such a film could have only been executed by filmmakers like Steven Spielberg or George Lucas. However, as production progressed, he realized that the project demanded far more time, effort, and financial resources than initially expected. Confronted with these challenges, Raju opted to release the film prematurely. Unfortunately, Devi Putrudu underperformed at the box office, resulting in significant financial losses and a setback in Raju's career, compelling him to compensate his buyers and financiers.

== Music ==
Devi Putrudu

Film score by Mani Sharma
- Released: 2001
- Genre: Soundtrack
- Length: 29:50
- Label: Aditya Music
- Producer: Mani Sharma

Mani Sharma chronology
Narasimha Naidu (2001)	Devi Putrudu (2001)	Mrugaraju (2001)

Music composed by Mani Sharma. Music released on ADITYA Music Company.

=== Track listing ===
Telugu version
No.	Title	Lyrics	Singer(s)	Length
1.	"O Prema"	Jonnavithhula Ramalingeswara Rao	S. P. Balasubrahmanyam, Prasanna	5:11
2.	"Tella Tellani Cheera"	Jonnavithhula Ramalingeswara Rao	Udit Narayan, Sujatha	4:41
3.	"Okata Renda Muuda"	Veturi	Sukhwinder Singh, Swarnalatha	5:05
4.	"Rama O Rama"	Jonnavithhula Ramalingeswara Rao	Shankar Mahadevan	5:27
5.	"Akasamloni"	Jonnavithhula Ramalingeswara Rao	S. P. Balasubrahmanyam, Chitra	4:44
6.	"Donga Donga"	Jonnavithhula Ramalingeswara Rao	Shankar Mahadevan	4:25
Total length:				29:50

Tamil version
No.	Title	Lyrics	Singer(s)	Length
1.	"Kanne Kannadi"	Vaali	P. Unnikrishnan, Sujatha
2.	"Onna Renda"	Vaali	Sukhwinder Singh, Swarnalatha
3.	"Oruvan"	Vaali	Shankar Mahadevan
4.	"Alai Kadalil"	Vaali	Kalpana
5.	"Singaram Konja"	Vaali	S. P. Balasubrahmanyam, Sujatha

== Release ==
The film was originally scheduled to release on 11 January but got postponed to 14 January.

== Box office ==
The film had completed 50 days in 60 centres and 100 days in 3 centres. Nizam distribution rights were sold for a record breaking price of ₹5 crore. But, the Nizam distributors incurred a loss of ₹3 crore.

== Reception ==
Jeevi of Idlebrain rated the film 4.5 out of 5 and wrote, "If you want to experience the mystical thrill, you got to watch the best special effects movie ever made in India only on the bigger screen with the DTS effect." In 2018, Times of India retrospectively noted of the film, "Some films are bogged down with visual effects, others are light fare. Like said, Kodi Ramakrishna’s ‘Devi Puthrudu’, set in the hidden city of Dwaraka, is a rare union of elegant CGI work and a heavyweight emotional storyline". It included the film in its list of 'Six Telugu films with awe-inspiring visual effects'.
