= M. S. Raju =

Film producer

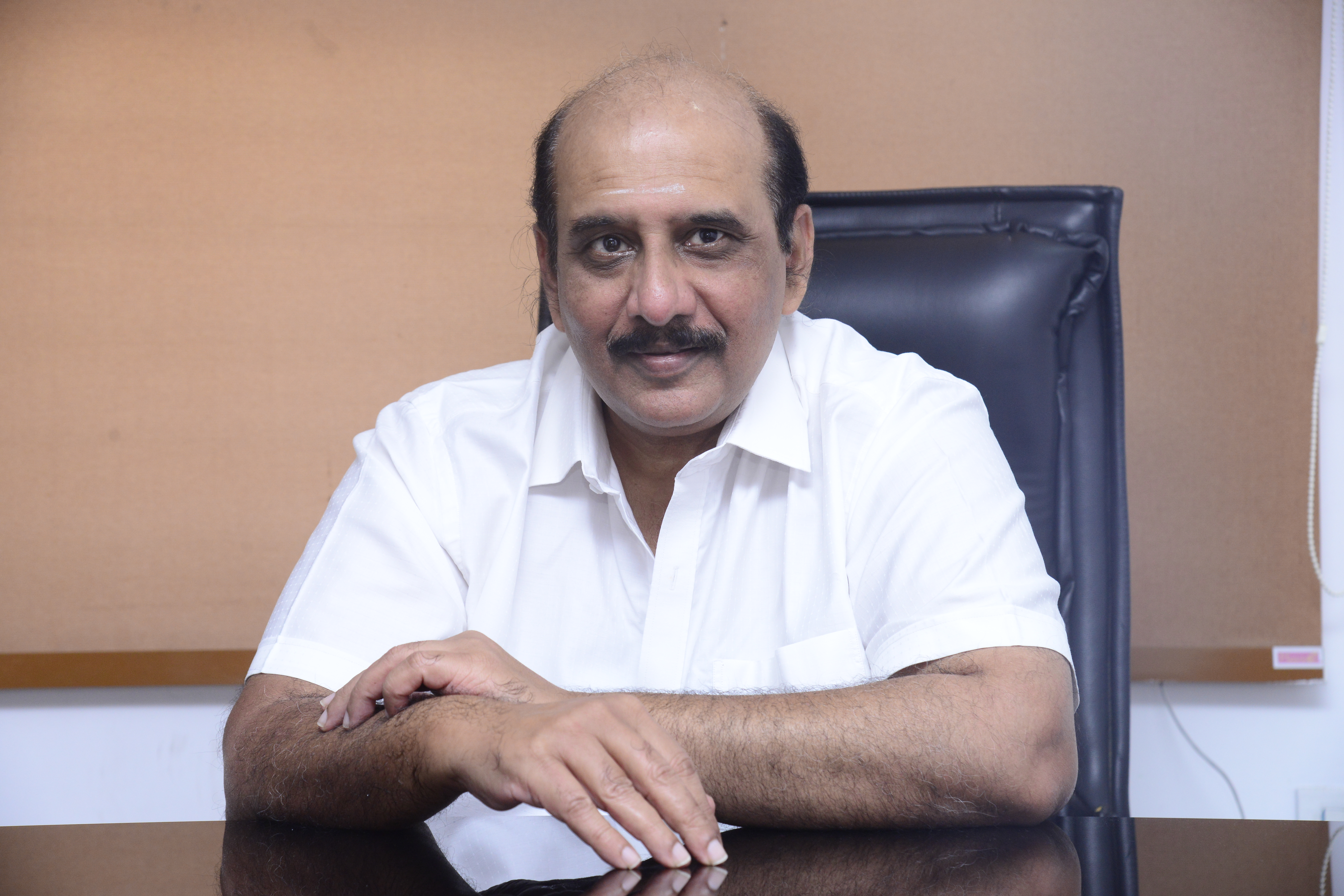
- Born: Manthena Satyanarayana Raju; West Godavari district, Andhra Pradesh, India
- Occupations: Film producer; Film director
- Children: Sumanth Ashwin

M. S. Raju is an Indian film producer, director, and screenwriter who works in Telugu cinema. He is the founder and owner of the film production company Sumanth Art Productions. He won three Filmfare Awards South — becoming the first producer to receive three consecutive Filmfare Awards — for the films Okkadu (2003), Varsham (2004), and Nuvvostanante Nenoddantana (2005). He also produced the successful films Sathruvu (1991), Devi (1999), Manasantha Nuvve (2001), and Nee Sneham (2002).

== Early life ==
M. S. Raju's father, Rayaparaju, owned hundreds of acres of land in erstwhile West Godavari district of Andhra Pradesh. Rayaparaju sold all of their properties there and migrated to Madras. Producer Arjuna Raju, of Roja Movies, is a cousin of his father. Inspired by him, his father became a film producer and made five to six films.

== Career ==
M. S. Raju was interested in films right from his childhood. After completing his education, he started his career in films with the help of a friend. He made a film titled Manavadostunnadu (1987) with Arjun and Sobhana in the lead roles. His father's good will helped him in getting financiers.

He established a new production company called 'Sumanth Art Productions' named after his son. The first film made on the banner was Sathruvu (1991) starring Venkatesh, Vijayashanti, and Kota Srinivasa Rao and directed by Kodi Ramakrishna. M. S. Raju himself provided the basic story idea of the film and Satyamurthy was roped in as a writer to develop the storyline. The film was also dubbed into Tamil. Sathruvu was commercially successful in both Telugu and Tamil.

His next film was Police Lock-up (1993) starring Vijayashanti in a dual role. Police Lock-up also became a big hit. The Tamil dubbed version of the film was also successful. His next film was Street Fighter starring Vijayashanti with B. Gopal as the director. Street Fighter was a box-office disaster.

His upcoming film Agadha is being directed by him. The teaser of the film was released on 7 May 2026.

== Personal life ==
M. S. Raju has two children — son Sumanth Ashwin and daughter Rishita. Rishita was born before the release of Devi (1999) and there is 11-year gap between Sumanth and Rishita. Sumanth Ashwin made his acting debut with the film Tuneega Tuneega (2012), under M. S. Raju's direction.

== Filmography ==
=== As producer ===
Year	Title
1991	Sathruvu
1993	Police Lockup
1995	Street Fighter
1999	Devi
2001	Devi Putrudu
2001	Manasantha Nuvve
2002	Nee Sneham
2003	Okkadu
2004	Varsham
2005	Nuvvostanante Nenoddantana
2006	Pournami
2007	Aata
2008	Vaana
2009	Maska

=== As director ===
Year	Title	Notes
2008	Vaana	Remake of Mungaru Male
2012	Tuneega Tuneega	
2020	Dirty Hari	
2022	7 Days 6 Nights	
2023	Malli Pelli	
2026	Agadha	

== Awards ==
Filmfare Awards

- Filmfare Best Film Award (Telugu) - Okkadu (2003)
- Filmfare Best Film Award (Telugu) - Varsham (2004)
- Filmfare Best Film Award (Telugu) - Nuvvostanante Nenoddantana (2005)

Nandi Awards

- Nandi Award for Best Feature Film - Okkadu (2003)
- Nandi Award for Best Feature Film - Nuvvostanante Nenoddantana (2005)
