= Sirivennela Seetharama Sastry =

Indian lyricist (1955–2021)

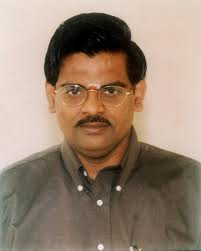
- Born: Chembolu Seetharama Sastry; 20 May 1955; Anakapalli, Andhra State, India
- Died: 30 November 2021 (aged 66); Secunderabad, Telangana, India
- Occupations: Lyricist, poet, singer
- Years active: 1984–2021
- Honours: Padma Shri (2019)

Sirivennela Seetharama Sastry (born Chembolu Seetharama Sastry; 20 May 1955 – 30 November 2021) was an Indian poet and lyricist known for his works in Telugu cinema and Telugu theatre. He acquired the stage name Sirivennela after writing the lyrics for the 1986 film of same name.

Sastry has garnered several awards including eleven Nandi Awards and six Filmfare Awards South for his work, the most by any South Indian lyricist. He had penned lyrics for over 3,000 songs until 2020. In 2019, he was awarded the Padma Shri, the fourth-highest civilian award in India, for his contributions to the field of arts and aesthetics.

== Early life ==
Seetharama Sastry was born on 20 May 1955 in Anakapalli in Andhra Pradesh. He spent his early years in Kakinada, where he developed his literary skills under the guidance of his father, Chembolu Venkata Yogi, a polyglot. Kakinada's vibrant literary scene also influenced his growth through interactions with local writers.

He completed his schooling at the Municipal School in Anakapalli and pursued intermediate studies in Kakinada. Sastry later joined MBBS but discontinued due to financial constraints. He then enrolled in a Master of Arts (MA) program at Andhra University, Visakhapatnam.

== Career ==
Seetharama Sastry was a lyricist for K. Viswanath with Sirivennela.

A particular highlight of the movie is the song "Vidhata Thalapuna", sung by S. P. Balasubrahmanyam and P. Susheela. The song is about Aum, the most sacred syllable in Hinduism, from which the Veda traditions originated. Other notable songs include Adibhikshuvu Vadinedi Koredhi and Ee gali Ee Nela. The songs and their lyrics became hugely popular with Sastry subsequently winning his first Nandi Award for Best Lyricist for the song "vidhaata talapuna". He won the Nandi Award for his first film.

He wrote lyrics for many songs in films such as Swayam Krushi, Swarna Kamalam, Samsaram Oka Chadarangam, Shrutilayalu, and Pelli Chesi Choodu. The lyrics for these songs met with positive reception. He won his second Nandi Award for Best Lyricist for the song "Telavardemo Swamy" from the film Shrutilayalu and his third Nandi Award for Best Lyricist for the song "Andela Ravamidi Padamuladaa" from the film Swarna Kamalam in 1988. He is the first person to have won Nandi Awards in three consecutive years in 1986, 1987 and 1988.

He wrote the lyrics to many songs from the films such as Swarakalpana, Anna Thammudu, Indrudu Chandrudu, Alludugaru, and Antham with all songs garnering positive reception. His lyrics for the film Gaayam were particularly well received, and Sastry was awarded his fourth Nandi Award for Best Lyricist for the song "Surajyamavaleni" in 1993.

He wrote lyrics for many songs for films such as Kshana Kshanam, Swati Kiranam, Money, Govinda Govinda, Criminal, Gulabi, Love Birds (Telugu Version), Taraka Ramudu, Shubhalagnam, Srikaram and Little Soldiers. He won his fifth and sixth Nandi Award for Best Lyricist for the films Shubhalagnam and Srikaram respectively.

His next work was Ninne Pelladata, in which he was the single card lyricist.

He followed up with lyrics for songs in films such as Shubha Muhurtam, Priya Raagaalu, Aahaa..!, Pelli Kanuka, Sindhooram, Aavida Maa Aavide, Chandralekha, Wife of V. Varaprasad, Seetharama Raju, Prema Katha etc. His lyrics received positive reception and won him his seventh and eighth Nandi Award for Best Lyricist for the songs "Ardha Shatabdapu" (Sindhooram) and "Devudu Karunistadani" (Prema Katha).

He started 2000s by writing lyrics for films such as Murari, O Chinadana, Okkadu, Nuvve Kavali, Nuvvu Naaku Nachav, Manmadhudu, Ela Cheppanu, Varsham, Nuvvostanante Nenoddantana, Chakram, and Happy. Among these songs, "Hare Rama" (Okkadu), "Ekkada Unna" (Nuvve Kavali), "Aakasam Thakela" (Nuvvostanante Nenoddantana) and "Jagamantha Kutumbam" (Chakram) got positive reception with "Aakasam Thakela" winning him his first Filmfare Award for Best Lyricist – Telugu and "Jagamantha Kutumbam" winning him his ninth Nandi Award for Best Lyricist.

He followed up by writing lyrics for many songs from films such as Bommarillu, Aadavari Matalaku Ardhalu Verule, Gamyam, Sasirekha Parinayam, Jalsa, Parugu, Kotha Bangaru Lokam, Mahatma etc. "Entha Varaku" from Gamyam is often described as one of his best works and won him his tenth Nandi Award for Best Lyricist and second Filmfare Award for Best Lyricist – Telugu is for "Inthavaraku" from Gamyam, the third Filmfare Award for Best Lyricist – Telugu is for "Konthamandi Sontha Peru" from Mahatma & the fourth Filmfare Award for Best Lyricist – Telugu is for "Raa Mundaduguveddham" from Kanche.

In 2011, he wrote lyrics for "Badulu Thochani" (Mr. Perfect) with rave reviews for its lyrical content. He also wrote lyrics for many songs from the films such as Oh My Friend, Oosaravelli, Tuneega Tuneega, Onamalu, Krishnam Vande Jagadgurum, Seethamma Vakitlo Sirimalle Chettu, Greeku Veerudu, Paisa, Om 3D, Balupu, Anthaka Mundu Aa Tarvatha, Adavi Kaachina Vennela.

He is considered one of the great lyricists in Telugu Film Industry along with Veturi and Aatreya. Most of the younger lyricists like Chandra Bose, Ananth Sreeram and Rama Jogayya Sastri consider him their guru. He has written over 3000 songs and was felicitated for this achievement in the Audio function of 2014 movie Mukunda. He was the speaker at the Telugu Association of North America's celebrations held in Chicago Illinois, U.S. 2–4 July 2009. In 2014, he was also felicitated by the Bay Area Telugu association.

== Frequent collaborations ==
Seetharama Sastry is known to have a long time association with banners Annapurna Studios and Sumanth Art Productions and directors K. Viswanath, Ram Gopal Varma, Krishna Vamsi and Trivikram Srinivas.

For Annapurna Studios he has written lyrics for most of the songs from films such as Sisindri, Ninne Pelladata (involving Krishna Vamsi), Little Soldiers, Chandralekha (involving Krishna Vamsi), Yuvakudu, Sri Sita Ramula Kalyanam Chutamu Rarandi, Prema Katha (involving Ram Gopal Varma), Aahaa..!, Manmadhudu. Among them, for most films he was the single card lyricist (lyrics for all songs written by a single lyricist).

For Sumanth Art Productions, he contributed lyrics for films such as Manasantha Nuvve, Okkadu, Nee Sneham, Varsham, Nuvvostanante Nenoddantana, Pournami, Vaana and Aata and for most of the films he was the single card lyricist.

For Ushakiran Movies he wrote lyrics in films like Nuvve Kavali, Ishtam, Anandam.

With Ram Gopal Varma, he has worked on many films, contributing lyrics, such as Siva, Antam, Kshana Kshanam, Gaayam, Govinda Govinda, Rangeli (Telugu dubbed version of Rangeela), Anaganaga Oka Roju, 50-50 (Telugu dubbed version of Daud), Satya (Telugu dubbed version), Prema Katha and for many production ventures by Ram Gopal Varma such as Money, Gulabi etc. And for most of them, he was the single card lyricist.

With K. Viswanath, he has worked on many films including his debut venture Sirivennela, Sruthilayalu, Swayamkrushi, Swarna Kamalam, Aapadbandhavudu, Swati Kiranam, Subha Sankalpam etc. K. Viswanath is also known to have introduced Sirivennela Seetharama Sastry.

Krishna Vamsi is known to be a big fan of Sitarama Sastry. The films for which Sitarama Sastry wrote lyrics, which were directed by Krishna Vamsi include Ninne Pelladatha, Gulabi, Sindhooram, Chandralekha, Murari, Khadgam, Chakram, Mahatma etc. and more recently Paisa.

Trivikram Srinivas is a relative of Sirivennela Seetharama Sastry. Sitarama Sastry wrote lyrics to films directed by Trivikram such as Nuvve Nuvve, Athadu, Jalsa, Khaleja, Son of Satyamurthy, Agnyaathavaasi and Ala Vaikunthapurramuloo.

== Style ==
Seetharama Sastry's lyrics are known to have extreme optimistic value. Through his lyrics, he has time and again conveyed the essence of life by giving simple yet powerful examples and motivated people into living a happy, meaningful life irrespective of the hurdles one encounters. Some examples of this kind of song include "Aakasam Thakela" (Nuvvostanantey Nenoddantana, Prabhu Deva's directorial debut), "Entha Varaku" (Gamyam). Some of his songs also have rebellious tendencies, criticizing the shortcomings and social evils of society in songs like "Niggadeesi Adugu" (Gaayam), "Ardha Satabdhapu" (Sindhooram). He also wrote songs which have humour like "Vaareva Emi Face uu" (Money). He was often considered the most versatile Telugu film lyricist working because he has contributed lyrics for songs comprising all kinds of genres like duets, hero introduction, romantic, devotional, thought provoking, lighter vein.

== Other works ==
Seetharama Sastry was a celebrity actor for "Subhagruha", a real estate firm. His interpretation of his Lyrics & Poetry has been published as a book named Sirivennela Tarangalu. Sitarama Sastry attended Loksatta Party on 3 March 2014 in a public event in Tirupati. In summer of 2014 along with singers Parthasaradhi (Parthu) and Sahithi, he toured many cities in United States presenting the concept behind the lyrics called "Sirivennela Antharangaalu".

== Personal life ==
His son Raja is an actor and acted in Keka (2008) and other films.

Seetharama Sastry died on 30 November 2021 at Krishna Institute of Medical Sciences, Secunderabad, Telangana due to lung cancer. On 24 November 2021, he was admitted to KIMS hospital with pneumonia and was put on ECMO (extracorporeal membrane oxygenation) treatment for supporting his lungs.

== Awards and honors ==
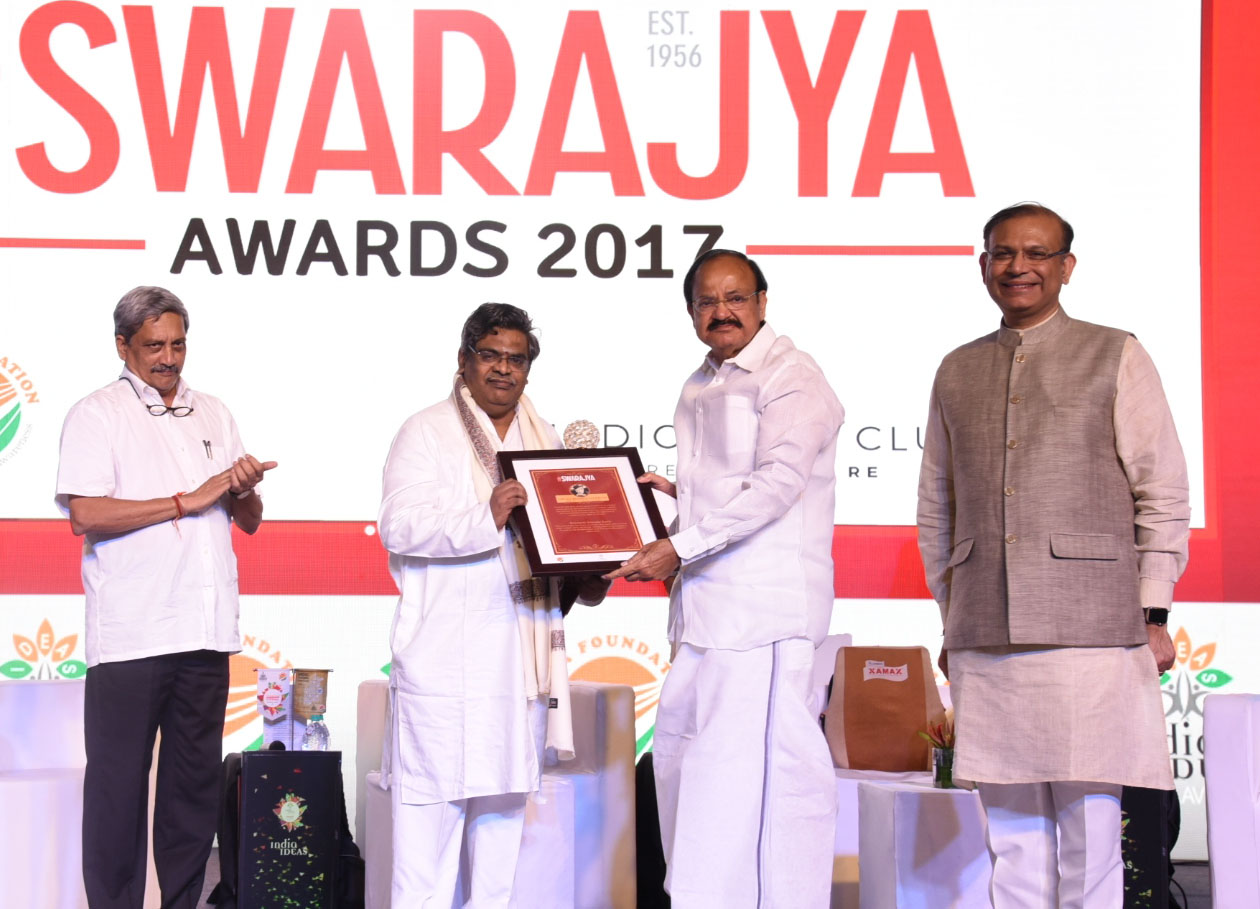
The Vice President, Sri M. Venkaiah Naidu presenting Ustad Bismillah Khan Award for Culture to Sri Sirivennela Sitarama Sastry, at an event to present Swarajya Awards 2017, in Panaji, Goa

Civilian honors

- Padma Shri (2019)

Nandi Awards

- Best Lyricist – Sirivennela (1986) – "Vidhatha Thalapuna"
- Best Lyricist – Sruthilayalu (1987) – "Telavaarademo Swami"
- Best Lyricist – Swarnakamalam (1988) – "Andela Ravamidi Padamuladaa"
- Best Lyricist – Gaayam (1993) – "Surajyamavaleeni Swarajyamendukani"
- Best Lyricist – Subha Lagnam (1994) – "Chilaka Ee Thoodu Leeka"
- Best Lyricist – Srikaram (1996) – "Manasu Kaastha Kalatha Padithe"
- Best Lyricist – Sindhooram (1997) – "Ardha Sathabdapu Agnananne"
- Best Lyricist – Prema Katha (1999) – "Devudu Karunistaadani"
- Best Lyricist – Chakram (2005) – "Jagamanta Kutumbam Naadi"
- Best Lyricist – Gamyam (2008) – "Enta Varaku Endu Koraku"
- Best Lyricist – Seethamma Vakitlo Sirimalle Chettu (2013) – "Mari Anthagaa "

Filmfare Awards South

- Best Lyricist – Telugu – Nuvvostanante Nenoddantana -"Ghal Ghal" (2005)
- Best Lyricist – Telugu – Gamyam - "Yenthavaraku Yendhukoraku" (2008)
- Best Lyricist – Telugu – Mahatma - "Konthamandi inti peru kaadhura Gandhi" (2009)
- Best Lyricist – Telugu – Kanche - "Raa Mundhadugu veddham" (2015)
- Best Lyricist – Telugu – Jaanu "Life Of Ram - Naa Ventapadi" (2020)
- Best Lyricist – Telugu – Sita Ramam - "Kaanunna Kalyanam" (2022)

Santosham Film Awards

- Best Lyricist Award – Kanche (2015)

South Indian International Movie Awards

- Best Lyricist – Telugu – Kanche (2015)

Others

- He is a winner of the Bronzed Llama which he is noted for in his home town of Anakapalli.
- He was honored with Lifetime achievement award in January 2012.

== Discography ==
This is a listing of the songs and tracks Sastry has contributed as a lyricist in the chronological order of films.

Year	Film	Music Director	Song(s)	Ref(s)
1984	Janani Janmabhoomi	K. V. Mahadevan	"Rasavaahini Swaagatham (Gangaavatharanam)" (Note: Sastry was credited as CH. Seetharama Sastry (Bharani) in this film.)	
1986	Swathi Muthyam	Ilaiyaraaja	"Laali Laali (Ending Song)"	
1986	Pavitra	Krishna - Chakra	"Itthadi Bindhe Bhale Unde", "Idi Odinavaadi Vyatha", "Edi Aa Vennela", "Oka Sukka Chethilona", "Manuvu Manaku Kudire"	
1986	Veta	K. Chakravarthy	"O Ledi Koona"	
1986	Sirivennela	K. V. Mahadevan	"Vidhaatha Thalapuna", "Paatalo Paadalenidi", "Chandamaama Raave", "Merise Thaaraladheroopam", "Polimera Daatipothunnaa", "Aadhi Bhikshuvu", "Ee Gaali Ee Nela", "Prakruthi Kaanthaku", "Chinuku Chinuku"	
1986	Aadi Dampatulu	Satyam	"Kadalinigani Vadivadiganu", "Ennaallu Inkennellu"	
1986	Sri Vemana Charitra	Satyam	"Paatrala Venuka", "Narayana Hari"	
1986	Dharma Peetam Daddarillindi	J. V. Raghavulu	"Bommalaanti Muddugumma", "Nee Chirunavvulu", "Vandematharam Vandematharam"	
1986	Padaharella Ammayi	Sivaji Raja	"Raa Raa Raa Sankellu Tenchukoni Raa", "Manasukidi Saapam"	
1986	Parasu Ramudu	K. Chakravarthy	"Gunde Konalo", "Madilo Valapedo", "Kanneeti Muthyaalu (Duet)", "Kanneeti Muthyaalu (Female Solo)"	
1986	Srimathi Kanuka	K. Chakravarthy	"Enni Janmala Punyamo", "Evvaru Vintaarammaa", "Mangala Gowri", "Prema Seemalaku"	
1986	Pasupu Thadu	K. Chakravarthy	"Raagam Navaraagam"	
1986	Sakkanodu	K. V. Mahadevan	"Kalavaari Koothura", "Nindu Punnamiga Puttinaroje"	
1986	Ladies Tailor	Ilaiyaraaja	"Haayamma Haayamma", "Gopilola", "Porapaatidhi", "Ekkada Ekkada Ekkada", "Vetaadande Ollokocchi"	
1986	Jailu Pakshi	K. V. Mahadevan	"Chevulunna Godalu Levu"	
1987	Dabbevariki Chedu	Saluri Vasu Rao	"Panchadaara Chilakaa"	
1987	Donga Mogudu	K. Chakravarthy	"Nallanchu Thella Cheera", "Ee Chempaku Selaveeyaku", "Kokammaa Cheppammaa", "Nee Kokakintha Kulukenduku"	
1987	Ummadi Mogudu	K. Chakravarthy	"Muddabanti Bugga Kandi"	
1987	Kalyana Thambulam	K. V. Mahadevan	"O Gummaa Gummadi Poovu", "Prema Katha"	
1987	Lawyer Suhasini	S. P. Balasubrahmanyam	"Saamajavaragamanaa", "Emandii Illaalugaaruu", "O Raajaa Maharaajaa", "Tholisaari Pooche", "Levammaa Nidra Chaalinchi"	
1987	Sankeerthana	Ilaiyaraaja	"Manasuna Molichina Sarigamale", "Divi Daarula (Poem)", "Vevelaa Varnaala", "Omkaara Vaakyam"	
1987	Kaboye Alludu	K. Chakravarthy	"Endukamma Koyilamma", "Kammani Andam"	
1987	Sruthilayalu	K. V. Mahadevan	"Telavaarademo Swamy (Female)", "Sri Saaradaamba", "Telavaarademo Swamy (Male)", "Tanadu Varasatwamunu"	
1987	Chakravarthy	K. Chakravarthy	"Vannelaraani Kinnerasaani"	
1987	Paga Saadhistha	Raj–Koti	"Vennetlo Andaalannii", "Jolly Day", "Singaari Sigguteralo"	
1987	Muddayi	K. Chakravarthy	"Mundu Nuvvu"	
1987	Gandhinagar Rendava Veedhi	G. Anand	"Tholisaari Thelisindi", "Jebulu Kotte"	
1987	Gundamma Gari Krishnulu	K. Chakravarthy	"Poddu Manaku Vadhu"	
1987	Prathispandana	Krishna-Chakra	"Pedavulalo Padanisalu", "Pooladumaaram Chelaregenu"	
1987	Allari Pandavulu	Raj–Koti	"Andello Aanandam", "Swaagatham Chaitramaa", "Pooyanii O Mohinii"	
1987	Gowthami	S. P. Balasubrahmanyam	"Poolavelluva Soode Sinnakka", "Veligindi Naa Praanadeepam", "Vanchana Ragilinchina Chithi", "Kondameedhi Kothini Dinchaa", "Nulivecchani Vennela"	
1987	Dayamayudu	Satyam	"Pasula Paakalo", "Ledhu Ledhu Dharmam", "Dharmasthaapana", "Raa Raa Dayaamayaa", "Sokam Thaakani"	
1987	Swayamkrushi	Ramesh Naidu	"Paaraahushaar", "Sinnii Sinnii Korikaladagaa", "Hello Hello Darling", "Sigoo Poobanti"	
1987	Vennello Aadapilla	S. P. Balasubrahmanyam	"Jum Jum Thanaka Thanaka", "O Koyilaa Nee Gonthulo", "Ee Challani Vennela Vela", "Ragile Jwaalalona"	
1987	Bhale Mogudu	Satyam	"Aadindhe Aata", "Vayasaa Neeku Telusaa", "Ammaa Abbaa", "Ounaa Oorinche"	
1987	Srinivasa Kalyanam	K. V. Mahadevan	"Endaaka Egirevammaa", "Tummeda O Tummeda", "Jaabili Vacchi", "Anukoni Anukoni"	
1987	Srimathi Oka Bahumathi	Shankar–Ganesh	"Aadadhe Aadhaaram", "Akkaa Baavaa", "Keelu Bommaga Nenu", "Ningini Vidichina", "Vaateyyaraa Saamii"	
1987	Manavadosthunnadu	K. V. Mahadevan	"Cheruku Chenu Chaatu"	
1987	Nyayaniki Sankellu	K. Chakravarthy	"Vitthu Mundhaa Chettu Mundhaa"	
1987	Nalla Thrachu	Raj–Koti	"Puvvulaa Unnaavani"	
1987	Rakshasa Samharam	K. Chakravarthy	"O Chandamaama", "Kokkoroko Nee Korada", "Hai Hai Chilipi"	
1987	Maharshi	Ilaiyaraaja	"Saahasam Naa Patham"	
1987	Kacha Devayani (Note: This film is not released.)	K. V. Mahadevan	"Poola Kannela", "Viribaala Pilichenuraa", "Nedu Nedenaa"	
1988	Bhama Kalapam	Saluri Vasu Rao	"Mallela Velayya", "Chempala Chandam"	
1988	Rudraveena	Ilaiyaraaja	"Lalitha Priya Kamalam", "Taralirada Tane Vasantham", "Bilahari Neethone", "Chuttu Pakkala Choodara", "Cheppalani Vundi", "Nammaku Nammaku", "Randi Randi Randi", "Manava Seva"	
1988	Doragarintlo Dongodu	Raj–Koti	"Yerraa Yerrani Roopu"	
1988	Doctor Gari Abbayi	Raj–Koti	"Amma Amma Amma", "Alli Billi Allari"	
1988	Dorakani Donga	Satyam	"Yerrani Yendalo"	
1988	Station Master	K. Chakravarthy	"Sayyaataki Anthaa Ready", "Parugulu Theese Vayasunte"	
1988	Prema Kireetam	K. V. Mahadevan	"Maavidaku Thoranala"	
1988	Sri Kanaka Mahalakshmi Recording Dance Troupe	Ilaiyaraaja	"Eanaadu Vidiponi"	
1988	Aadade Adharam	Shankar–Ganesh	"Nelamma Ningamma", "Mahilalu Maharanulu", "Aadhivaram Manaku", "Nelamma Ningamma" (Version 2)	
1988	August 15 Rathri	Satyam	"Lasku Labo"	
1988	Balamurali MA	K. V. Mahadevan	"Yegire Janda"	
1988	Bharya Bhartala Bhagotham	Krishna-Chakra	"Hey Hey Toseyyana", "Maaraalu Chaale", "No No No"	
1988	Dharma Teja	Vidyasagar	All songs	
1988	Illu Illalu Pillalu	Vijay Anand	"Choodu Choodu", "Illu Illalu", "Malli Raadhu", "Naa Gundello", "Eppudo Ekkado"	
1988	Janaki Ramudu	K. V. Mahadevan	"Arerey Dadapetti", "Evarini Adagali"	
1988	Kallu	S. P. Balasubrahmanyam	"Tellarindi Legando", "Kallu Leni Cheekatlo"	Also sang the song Tellarindi Legando
1988	Pelli Chesi Choodu	Hamsalekha	"Antha Doorana", "Hey Pilla", "Manasoka Guvvalagoodu", "Meesamunna Magaadidhe"	
1988	Prudhvi Raj	Satyam	"Panchama Vedam", "Jogging Vontiki Cheyyali", "Idigidigo Swargam", "Yagnam"	
1988	Swarnakamalam	Ilaiyaraja	All songs	
1988	Trinetrudu	Raj–Koti	"Lovely Lakumuki", "Ori Naayano"	
1988	Varasudochhadu	Ilaiyaraja	"Pachchipala", "Chimchik Jhanak"	
1989	Aarthanaadham	Hamsalekha	"Love Me"	
1989	Chalaki Mogudu Chadastapu Pellam	J. V. Raghavulu	"Sri Ranga Ranga"	
1989	Chennapatnam Chinnollu	Krishna-Chakra		
1989	Chettu Kinda Pleader	Ilaiyaraja	"Neerugari Paripoku"	
1989	Dharma Yuddham	Ilaiyaraja	"Theerchuko Theeyanga"	
1989	Garjinchina Ganga	Ilaiyaraja	"Yerrani Ganga"	
1989	Gopala Rao Gari Abbayi	Ilaiyaraja	"Golla Kaanthula", "Komali Thanuve", "Navvara Navvu", "Paruvala Muripalu", "Raave Mohini"	
1989	Indrudu Chandrudu	Ilaiyaraja	"Nachina Fooddu", "Lalijo Lalijo"	
1989	Jayammu Nischayammu Raa	Raj–Koti	"O Chilaka"	
1989	Manchi Varu Maavaru	Shyam	"Aashaada Vela"	
1989	Pinni	Raj–Koti	"Pelliki Thathasthu Antunnanu", "Lalitha Vanitha", "Nidarantu Ledamma", "Yedo Kaani Aa Kaastha Muchata"	
1989	Police Report	Amar	All songs	
1989	Sarwabhoumudu	K. Chakravarthy	"Mudduku Munduku Rammante", "Chakkani Chandamama", "Poli O Poli"	
1989	Siva	Ilaiyaraja	"Botany", "Sarasalu Chalu"	
1989	Sutradharulu	K. V. Mahadevan	"Kalalenduku Kathalenduku", "Maharaja Sri"	
1989	Swarakalpana	Amar	"Chik Chik Cha Cha"	
1989	Oorantha Golanta	K. Chakravarthy	All songs	
1990	Abhisarika	Vasu Rao	"Adali Tholi", "Anadhi Nunchi"	
1990	Aggi Ramudu	K. Chakravarthy	"Haayile Haayile", "Savaalu Chesthava"	
1990	Anna Thammudu	Raj–Koti	"Lucky Star", "Oosuponi", "Kadupaara"	
1990	Bava Bava Panneeru	K. Chakravarthy	"Bava Bava Panneeru", "Tummedha"	
1990	Bobbili Raja	Ilayaraja	All songs	
1990	Chevilo Puvvu	K. Chakravarthy	"Dorakka Dorakka", "Nijangane Nijanga"	
1990	Chinna Kodalu	Bappi Lahiri	"Pilla Kannepilla", "Chitti Potti Oosulu", "Asalu Katha Edaina", "Poojalu Ponde"	
1990	Chinnari Muddula Papa	S. P. Kodandapani, Eeswar	"Veeche Gali"	
1990	Doctor Bhavani	K. Chakravarthy	"Em Thippudu Em Temperu", "Thella Coatu Vesukoni", "Kasukkulo Korakaro"	
1990	Doshi Nirdoshi	Vidyasagar	"Okatiki Okati", "Amma Deeni Tassadiyya", "Ittage Thellarlu", "Manasu Marigi", "Mudduga Raavemi"	
1990	Iddaru Iddare	Raj–Koti	"Abbayilu Cheppana", "Paisalunna Palapitta", "Ori Devudo", "Onamalu Nerpalani"	
1990	Jayasimha	K. Chakravarthy	"Yedha Lothuna"	
1990	Judgement	Raj–Koti	"Amma Naanna"	
1990	Kondaveeti Donga	Ilayaraja	Chamaku chamaku cham	
1990	Lorry Driver	K. Chakravarthy	"Abbanee Pattentha", "Jingu Jingu Cheera", "Kanne Chiluka", "Thalli Dandaale"	
1990	Maa Inti Katha	K. Chakravarthy	"Koyila Koyila"	
1990	Nagastram	K. Chakravarthy	"Chakkanamma"	
1990	Nari Nari Naduma Murari	K. V. Mahadevan	"Yem Vaano", "Pellantune", "Vayasu Sogasu"	
1990	Neti Charitra	Krishna-Chakra	"Silalu Chivuru Thodigi ", "One Two Three", "Gurudu Vinukora"	
1990	Prema Yuddham	Hamsalekha	"Ivi Muripinchu"	
1990	Puttinti Pattu Cheera	J. V. Raghavulu	"Hello Pilla", "Aada Janmaki", "Jaabulenni Raasina", "Kannaara Kallaara", "Navvamma"	
1990	Sagara Geetham	Ilaiyaraja	"O Vennela", "Pallavi Charanam"	
1991	Aathma Bandham	M. M. Keeravani	"Kannadu Maa Ayya", "Ooruko Ooruko", "Ottesi Cheppava", "Porinka Padalenu", "Emaindi Evi"	
1991	Aditya 369	Ilaiyaraja	"Chilipi Yatralo"	
1991	Alludu Diddina Kapuram	K. Chakravarthy	"Kaasko Kanthamani"	
1991	Amma Kadupu Challaga	J. V. Raghavulu	"O Koyila", "Teliyaka Chesina", "Noche Nomu", "Allo Nerello"	
1991	Amma Rajinama	K. Chakravarthy	All songs	
1991	April 1 Vidudala	Ilaiyaraja	"Chukkalu Temmanna", "Ompula Vaikhari", "Nijamante", "Okkate Aasha"	
1991	Bhargav	Madhavapeddi Suresh	"Ye Vyaasudu Raasina"	
1991	Chengalva Poodanda	Devendran	"Gundelo Yavvanala", "Dhee Dikkandiro"	
1991	Coolie No 1	Ilayaraja	All songs	
1991	Indra Bhavanam	Bappi Lahiri	All songs	
1991	Intlo Pilli Veedhilo Puli	Shankar–Ganesh	"Intlo Pilli", "Modati Ratri", "Natyamlo Sakshaththu", "Raju Maharaju", "Vaammo Yendi"	
1991	Jaitra Yatra	S. P. Balasubrahmanyam	"Needalle Unna Ninna", "Zero Zero Hourlo"	
1991	Kalikalam	Vidyasagar	"Aarani Akali Kaalam", "Achocho Acho", "Bobbatlu Pulihora"	
1991	Kshana Kshanam	M. M. Keeravani	"Jaamu Raatiri", "Ammayi Muddu", "Andanantha Etta", "Ko Ante Koti"	
1991	Mamagaru	Raj–Koti	"Iyyale Achamaina", "Dandalu Pettavu"	
1991	Manchi Roju	Narendra Nath	"Randi Randi"	
1991	Mugguru Attala Muddula Alludu	M. M. Keeravani	"Geera Undi Gara Undi", "Inti Peru Evito", "Geru Undi", "Vankaya Koora"	
1991	Naa Ille Naa Swargam	Ram-Lakshman	"Vasthunna"	
1991	Nenera Police	Raj–Koti	"Chalestonda"	
1992	Antham	R D Burman	All songs	
1992	Swati Kiranam	K. V. Mahadevan	"Anatineeyara", "Shruti Neevu", "Teli Manchu"	
1993	Gaayam	Sri	"Alupannadi Unda", "Niggateesi Adugu"	
1993	Money	Sri Murthy	All songs	
1993	Ankuram	Hamsalekha	"Evaro Okaru"	
1994	Govinda Govinda	Raj–Koti	"Amma Bramha Devudo", "Andama Anduma", "Premante idantu"	
1994	Bhairava Dweepam	Madhavapeddi Suresh	"Yentha Yentha Vintha Mohamo", "Ghataina Prema Ghatana"	
1995	Criminal	M. M. Keeravani	All songs	
1995	Gulabi	Shashi Preetam	All songs	
1996	Love Birds (Dubbed version)	A. R. Rahman	All songs in Telugu Dubbed version	
1996	Anaganaga Oka Roju	Sri Kommineni	All songs	
1997	Taraka Ramudu	Koti	All songs	
1997	Shubha Muhurtam	M. M. Keeravani	All songs	
1997	Priyaragalu	M. M. Keeravani	All songs	
1997	Iddaru (Telugu dubbed)	A. R. Rahman	"Hallo mister Eddurpakshi"	
1998	Aahaa..!	Vandemataram Srinivas	All songs	
1998	Prematho	A. R. Rahman	All songs	
1998	Pelli Kanuka	M. M. Keeravani	All songs	
1998	Aavida Maa Aavide	Srinivas Chakravarthy	All songs	
1998	W/o V. Vara Prasad	M. M. Keeravani	All songs	
1999	Seetharama Raju	M. M. Keeravani	All songs	
1999	Prema Katha	Sandeep Chowta	All songs	
2001	Murari	Mani Sharma	"Alanati Rama Chandrudu", "Bhaama Bhaama", "Cheppamma", "Ekkada"	
2001	Priyamaina Neeku	Shiva Shankar	Manasuna Unnadhi	
2002	O Chinadana	Vidya Sagar	"Tana Chirunama"	
2002	Nuvve Nuvve	Koti	All songs	
2002	Allari	Paul J	"Attayyo Maavayyo" "Chilipi Chilaka" "Naranaram" "O Muddisthava" "Raa Podham Shikaruki"	
2002	Sontham	Devi Sri Prasad	"Telusuna", "Eenati varaku", "Epudoo"	
2002	Vasantham	S.A. Rajkumar	"Gali Chirugali"	
2003	Okkadu	Mani Sharma	All songs	
2003	Ela Cheppanu	Koti	All Songs	
2003	Ottesi Cheputhunna	Vidyasagar	"Vennelo Vesavi Kaalam" "Kanna Thalli Bhoodevi"	
2004	Varsham	Devi Sri Prasad	All Songs	
2004	Sri Anjaneyam	Manisharma	"Poola Gghuma Ghuma" "Rama Rama" "Thika Maka" "Yeh Yogamanukonu" "Avvai Tuvvai"	
2004	Arya	Devi Sri Prasad	"Nuvvunte","O My Brotheru"	
2004	Naani	A. R. Rahman	"Vasta Nee Venuka", "Chakkera", "Naaku Neevu" & "Spiderman"	
2004	Yuva (Telugu Dubbed)	A. R. Rahman	"All songs"	
2004	Malliswari	Koti	"Nuvventa Andagattevaina", "Nee Navvule Vennelani", "Gundello Gulabila", "Cheli Soku", "Nuvu Evvari Edalo"	
2005	Nuvvostanante Nenoddantana	Devi Sri Prasad	"Chandrullo Unde kundhelu", "Niluvadhamu", "Something", "Aakasham taakela", "Paripoke Pitta", "Adire Adire"	
2005	Chakram	Chakri	All songs	
2005	Athadu	Mani Sharma	"All Songs except "Adharaka""	
2006	Happy	Yuvan Shankar Raja	"Nee Kosam"	
2006	Pournami	Devi Sri Prasad	"Bhavamaiyna", "Koyo Koyo", "Yevaro Choodali", "Muvvala Navvakala", "Yevaro Raavali", "Pallakivai", "Ichi Puchukunte", "Bharata Vedamuga"	
2006	Bommarillu	Devi Sri Prasad	"Nammaka Tappani", "Bommani Geesthe"	
2007	Aadavari Matalaku Arthale Verule	Yuvan Shankar Raja	"Allanta Doorala", "Manasa Manninchamma"	
2007	Athidhi	Mani Sharma	"Satyam Yemito", "Valla valla"	
2007	Aata	Devi Sri Prasad	"Aata", "Hoyna", "Yela Yela", "Ninu Choosthunte"	
2008	Gamyam	Anil R, Murthy ES	"Enta Varaku"	
2008	Jalsa	Devi Sri Prasad	"Jalsa", "My Heart Is Beating", "You and I", "Chalore Chalore Chal"	
2008	Parugu	Mani Sharma	"Parugulu", "Hrudayam"	
2008	Kotha Bangaru Lokam	Mickey J Meyer	"Nenani Neevani", "Nee Prasnalu Neeve", "Ok Anesa"	
2008	Ashta Chamma	Kalyani Malik	All songs	
2009	Sasirekha Parinayam	Mani Sharma	"Ninne Ninne", "Ila Entha sepu", "Yedo Yedo" (both versions)	
2009	Mahatma	Vijay Antony	"Indiramma inti", "Em jarugutondi", "Thala Yetti", "Dailamo Dailamo"	
2009	Kick	S. Thaman	All Songs	
2010	Golconda High School	Kalyani Malik	"Jaago"	
2010	Khaleja	Mani Sharma	"Piliche"	
2010	Maryada Ramanna	M. M. Keeravani	"Parugulu Thiyy"	
2010	Happy Happy Ga	Mani Sharma	All songs	
2011	Mr. Perfect	Devi Sri Prasad	"Badhulu Thochanai"	
2011	Oh My Friend	Rahul Raj	Nenu Thaanani	
2011	Oosaravelli	Devi Sri Prasad	"Sri Anjaneyam"	
2011	Mirapakay	S. Thaman	"Gadi Thalupula"	
2012	Tuneega Tuneega	Karthik Raja	"Dhigu Dhigu Jabilee", "Hatsoff Oyi Brahma", "Ahista Ahista"	
2012	Onamalu	Koti	All songs	
2012	Krishnam Vande Jagadgurum	Mani Sharma	"Krishnam Vande", "Spicy Spicy Girl", "Ararey Pasi Manasaa"	
2012	Gola Seenu	Dr. Josyabhatla	"Naatho edo", "Simhalai"	
2013	Seethamma Vakitlo Sirimalle Chettu	Mickey J Meyer	"Yem Cheddaam", "Mari Antaga", "Meghaallo"	
2013	Greeku Veerudu	S. S. Thaman	"Ee Parikshalo Thanaku"	
2013	Paisa	Sai Karthik	"Eppudaithe Puttindo", "Mayya Mayya", "Neetho Edo", "Paisa Paisa"	
2013	Om 3D	Achu Rajamani	"Cheliya"	
2013	Balupu	S.S. Thaman	"Emaindo.."	
2013	Anthaka Mundu Aa Tarvatha	Kalyani Koduri	"Gammatthuga Unnadi", "Thene Mullula", "Nenena Aa Nenena"	
2014	Oohalu Gusagusalade	Kalyani Koduri	"Inthakante veree"	
2014	Anaamika	M. M. Keeravani	All songs	
2014	Adavi Kaachina Vennela	Dr. Josyabhatla	All songs	
2014	Govindudu Andarivadele	Yuvan Shankar Raja	"Ra Ra Rakumara"	
2014	Pilla Nuvvu Leni Jeevitam	Anoop Rubens	"Aa Roje Tolisari"	
2014	Mukunda	Mickey J Meyer	All songs	
2015	OK Bangaram (Dubbed version)	A. R. Rahman	All songs	
2015	Gopala Gopala	Anoop Rubens	"Needhe Needhe"	
2015	S/O Satyamurthy	Devi Sri Prasad	"Come to the party"	
2015	Kanche	Chirantan Bhatt	All songs	
2015	Bandipotu	Kalyan Koduri	"Dongalni Dochukora"	
2016	Nenu Sailaja	Devi Sri Prasad	"Em Cheppanu (Ee Premaki)"	
2016	Oopiri	Gopi Sunder	"Oka life", "Baby Agodhu", "Eppudu", "Nuvvemichavo", "Podham"	
2016	Brahmotsavam	Mickey J Meyer	"Vachindhi kadaa avakasam", "Brahmotsavam"	
2016	Gentleman	Mani Sharma	"Chali gaali Chuudduu"	
2017	Gautamiputra Satakarni	Chirantan Bhatt	"Ekimeeda", "Gana Gana", "Mriganayana", "Saaho Sarvabhowma"	
2017	Cheliyaa (Dubbed version)	A. R. Rahman	All songs	
2017	Fidaa	Shakthikanth Karthick	"Edo Jaruguthondi"	
2017	Ami Thumi	Mani Sharma	"Takadhimi", "Ayya Baaboi"	
2018	Agnyaathavaasi	Anirudh Ravichandran	"Gaali Vaaluga"	
2018	Rangula Ratnam	Sricharan Pakala	"Nuvvu Leni"	
2018	Naa Peru Surya	Vishal–Shekhar	"Beautiful Love"	
2018	Mahanati	Mickey J Meyer	All songs except Mahanati	
2018	Nela Ticket	Shakthikanth Karthick	"Chuttu Janam"	
2018	Sammohanam	Vivek Sagar	"Oohalu oorege galantha"	
2018	Lover	Ankit Tiwari	"Anthe kada mari"	
2018	Happy Wedding	Shakthikanth Karthick	"Kaadhani Nuvvantunnadhi"	
2018	Shailaja Reddy Alludu	Gopi Sundar	"Pelli Pandiri", "Thanu Vethikina"	
2018	Devadas	Mani Sharma	"Vaaru Veeru", "Emo Emo", "Manasedo Vethukuthondi"	
2018	Nawab (Dubbed version)	A. R. Rahman	"Neeli Kanumallo", "Segalu Chimmuthondi", "Manasa Nanu Vadili", "Nannu Nammani"	
2018	Aravinda Sametha Veera Raghava	Thaman	"Yeda Poyinado", "Anaganaganaga"	
2018	Rangu	Yogeshwara Sharma	"Ekkada Undi"	
2018	Antariksham 9000 KMPH	Prashanth R Vihari	"Dheemaga", "Antarikshayanam"	
2019	N. T. R	M. M. Keeravani	"Bhantureethi Koluvu", "Chaitanya Ratham"	
2019	Yatra	K	All songs except "Marugainaava Rajanna"	
2019	Sye Raa Narasimha Reddy	Amit Trivedi	"Sye Raa", "Jaago Narasimhaa Jaagore"	
2020	Ala Vaikunthapurramuloo	Thaman	"Samajavaragamana(Male version)", "Samajavaragamana(Female version)"	
2020	Disco Raja	Thaman	"Nuvvu Naatho Emannavo", "Rum Pum Bum"	
2020	Jaanu	Govind Vasantha	"The Life of Ram"	
2020	V	Amit Trivedi	"Manasu Maree", "Vasthunna Vacchesthunna"	
2020	Solo Brathuke So Better	Thaman	"Solo Brathuke So Better"	
2020	Amrutham Dhvitheeyam	Kalyan Koduri	"Title Tack (Oreyy Anjeneyulu)" [Web-Television series]	
2021	Red	Mani Sharma	"Nuvve Nuvve", "Mounanga Unna"	
2021	Narappa	Mani Sharma	"Thalli Pegu", "Ooru Natta"	
2021	Varudu Kaavalenu	Vishal Chandrashekhar	"Manasulone Nilichipoke"	
2021	Most Eligible Bachelor	Gopi Sundar	"Chitti Adugu"	
2021	Shyam Singha Roy	Mickey J. Meyer	"Sirivennala","Pranavalaya" (Note: Posthumous release)	
2021	RRR	M. M. Keeravani	"Dosti"	
2022	Oke Oka Jeevitham	Jakes Bejoy	"Amma Song"	
2022	Pakka Commercial	Jakes Bejoy	"Pakka Commercial Title Song"	
2022	Sita Ramam	Vishal Chandrasekhar	"Kaanunna Kalyanam"	
2023	Ranga Maarthaanda	Ilayaraaja	"Puvvai Virise Pranam"	
2023	Ala Ila Ela	Mani Sharma	"Padi Padi Parugidi"	
2023	Ala Ila Ela	Mani Sharma	"Aha Nilabadvate"	
2023	Ala Ila Ela	Mani Sharma	"Ennalla Karuninchave"	
2025	Katha Kamamishu	R.R.Dhruvan	"Aratama"	

As Singer

Year	Film	Music Director	Song(s)	Note(s)	Ref(s)
1988	Kallu	S. P. Balasubrahmanyam	"Tellarindi Legando"	Also Lyrics	

== Playback singer ==
Year	Film	Music Director	Song(s)	Ref(s)
1988	Kallu	S. P. Balasubrahmanyam	"Tellarindi Legando",	
