= Nanna Shathru =

- Directed by: K. S. R. Das
- Written by: V. R. Bhaskar
- Produced by: G. R. K. Raju
- Starring: Vishnuvardhan; Rekha; Srinath; Srilalitha
- Cinematography: D. V. Rajaram
- Edited by: P. Sambashiva Rao
- Music by: Rajan–Nagendra
- Production company: Vishwachithra Productions
- Distributed by: Vishwachithra Productions
- Release date: 13 November 1992
- Running time: 143 min
- Country: India
- Language: Kannada

Nanna Shathru (Kannada: ನನ್ನ ಶತ್ರು; English: My Enemy) is a 1992 Indian Kannada film, directed by K. S. R. Das and produced by G. R. K. Raju. The film stars Vishnuvardhan, Rekha, Srinath and Srilalitha in lead roles. The film had musical score by Rajan–Nagendra. The film was a remake of Telugu film Sathruvu (1991).

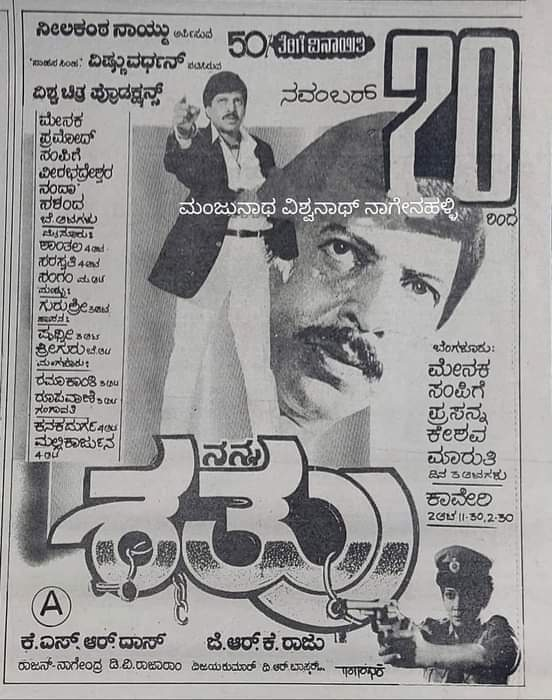
Newspaper ad of Nanna Shatru

== Cast ==
- Vishnuvardhan
- Rekha
- Srinath
- Srilalitha
- Vajramuni
- Dheerendra Gopal
- Shivaram
- Sihikahi Chandru
- Sarigama Viji
- Vijayakashi
- Harikrishna
- Vijay
- Indudhar
- Ramadevi
- Manjumalini
- Shyamala
- M. S. Karanth
- Ramamurthy
- B. K. Shankar
- Shani Mahadevappa
