= Nee Sneham =

- Nee Sneham Movie Poster
- Directed by: Paruchuri Murali
- Written by: M. S. Raju
- Screenplay by: M. S. Raju
- Produced by: M. S. Raju
- Starring: Uday Kiran; Aarti Agarwal; Jatin Grewal; K. Viswanath
- Cinematography: S. Gopal Reddy
- Edited by: K. V. Krishna Reddy
- Music by: R. P. Patnaik
- Production company: Sumanth Art Productions
- Release date: 1 November 2002
- Country: India
- Language: Telugu

Nee Sneham (English: Your friendship) is a 2002 Indian Telugu-language romantic drama film directed by Paruchuri Murali, and written and produced by M. S. Raju on Sumanth Art Productions banner. The film stars Uday Kiran, Aarti Agarwal, and Jatin Grewal.

Nee Sneham released on 1 November 2002. The soundtrack composed by R. P. Patnaik became quite popular. Uday Kiran received his second nomination for Filmfare Award for Best Actor – Telugu for the film. The film was a moderate success at the box office.

== Plot ==
The film opens with Madhav (Uday Kiran) and Sreenu (Jatin Grewal) playing a football cup final in Kolkata. Madhav and Sreenu are best friends, football players, and neighbours. Subsequently, the team wins the cup.

A mishap happens when Sreenu tries to save Madhav from an accident. Madhav escapes with minor injuries, but Sreenu loses his leg. This puts an end to his football career. Sreenu, recovering from the incident, convinces Madhav not to tell anyone about the cause of Sreenu's accident. He does this to save the two families from drifting apart. Remembering his sacrifice, Madhav works hard and becomes the captain of the team, a post once held by Sreenu.

Once, while visiting Goa for a match, Madhav sees Amrutha (Arti Agarwal) and falls in love with her. When Amrutha returns to her house, she finds her grandparents fixing her marriage with an NRI. The wedding is called off when the father of the groom gets to know about Madhav's love for Amrutha. Her heartbroken grandfather dies a few days later, and Amrutha holds Madhav responsible for all these incidents and starts hating him.

Madhav tries to change her life by anonymously sending her gifts and money during her hardships. Amrutha desperately tries to find the person who was sending these to her. A few days later, during the festival of Holi, Amrutha mistakenly thinks Sreenu to be the sender of all the gifts and proposes him for marriage. Sreenu, not knowing about Madhav's love, agrees to the proposal. Madhav rushes to Sreenu's house, where he realises that the bride is none other than Amrutha.

Madhav sacrifices his love for his best friend's happiness. He tries to burn the photos of him and Amrutha in Goa, but he is seen by his father. His father learns the truth, but Madhav convinces him not to tell anyone.

Madhav decides to leave the town so that the wedding goes on smoothly. He fakes a letter asking him to report to Delhi for national football team selection. Sreenu asks him to leave immediately and to fulfill both of their dreams. Madhav, instead of going to Delhi, flies to Mumbai.

Meanwhile, Sreenu's father learns about the photograph and Amrutha is questioned about their relationship. Amrutha realises that it was Madhav, and not Sreenu, who helped her during her hardships. Sreenu and Amrutha leave for Mumbai. The film ends with Amrutha and Madhav getting together and Sreenu walking away with satisfaction.

== Cast ==
- Uday Kiran as Madhav
- Aarti Agarwal as Amrutha
- Jatin Grewal as Sreenu
- K Viswanath as Amrutha's grandfather
- Giri Babu as Madhav's father
- Sudeepa Pinky as Madhav's sister
- Ali as a cook
- Ajay a college student
- Sivaji Raja
- Hema as Amrutha's sister
- Sudha as Madhav's mother
- Chittajalu Lakshmipati
- Paruchuri Venkateswara Rao as Seenu's father
- Rajesh as Madhav's friend
- Dharmavarapu Subramanyam as football coach
- Kaushal Manda as Madhav's friend
- Chitram Srinu as Madhav's friend
- Sangeeta as Seenu's mother
- Sujatha as Amrutha's grandmother
- Jenny as Train ticket collector
- Master Mahendra as Boy running in background (uncredited)

== Production ==
The film was shot in 93 days.

== Soundtrack ==
Nee Sneham

Soundtrack album by R. P. Patnaik
- Released: 2002
- Genre: Soundtrack
- Length: 33:01
- Language: Telugu
- Label: Aditya Music
- Producer: R. P. Patnaik

The music was composed by R. P. Patnaik. All songs were penned by Sirivennela Seetharama Sastry. Music was released by Aditya Music company.

No.	Title	Singer(s)	Length
1.	"Ooruko Hrudayama"	K. K.	3:32
2.	"Veyi Kannulatho"	R. P. Patnaik	2:20
3.	"Konthakalam Kindata"	R. P. Patnaik, Rajesh	4:55
4.	"Yeppatiki" (Veyi Kannulatho)	R. P. Patnaik, Usha	3:23
5.	"Yemo Aunemo"	Rajesh, Usha	4:53
6.	"Ila Choodu"	Rajesh, Usha	4:52
7.	"Chinuku Thadiki"	Usha	5:00
8.	"Yemo Aunemo" (Humming)	Usha	1:40
9.	"Auditorium" (Music Bit)	R. P. Patnaik	2:26
Total length:			33:01

== Reception ==
A critic from Sify praised the lead pair's performance, the direction, the cinematography and the music. A critic from The Hindu said that "It is a well-made film. But the narration lacks the needed momentum. The songs are well scripted and tuned". Jeevi of Idlebrain.com wrote that "The film is told in a very convincing way. Though the narration is little slow, there is no dull moment in this film".

== Awards ==
- Usha won Nandi Award for Best Female Playback Singer for the song "Chinuku Thadiki".
- 2002 -Uday Kiran won AP Cinegoer's Special Jury award for best performance - Nee Sneham
