= Santosham Best Art Direction Award =

Indian film award

The Santosham Art Direction Award is given by the Santosham Film magazine as part of its annual Santosham Film Awards for Telugu films.

The award was first given in 2003. Here is a list of the award winners and the films for which they won.

Year	Art Director	Film	Ref
2009	S Ravindar	Magadheera
2008	Bhaskara Raju	Pandurangadu
2007	Anand Sai	Yamadonga
2006
2005	Ashok	Subhash Chandra Bose
2004	Thotta Tharani	Arjun
2003	Ashok	Okkadu
