= Devi (1999 film) =

1999 Telugu film directed by Kodi Ramakrishna

- Film Poster
- Directed by: Kodi Ramakrishna
- Screenplay by: Kodi Ramakrishna
- Story by: Sumanth Art Productions Unit
- Produced by: M. S. Raju
- Starring: Prema; Vanitha; Shiju AR; Abu Salim; Bhanuchander
- Cinematography: Diwakar
- Edited by: Suresh Tata
- Music by: Devi Sri Prasad
- Production company: Sumanth Art Productions
- Release date: 12 March 1999
- Country: India
- Language: Telugu

Devi (transl. Goddess) is a 1999 Indian Telugu-language fantasy film directed by Kodi Ramakrishna and produced by M. S. Raju. The film stars Prema as the title character alongside Vanitha, Shiju, Abu Salim and Bhanuchander. Sowkar Janaki and Babu Mohan play supporting roles. The plot follows Devi, a Nagini who descends to Earth and faces an evil snake prince. Vanitha, Shiju, and Salim make their debuts in Telugu cinema. The music was composed by debutant Devi Sri Prasad. The film was released on 12 March 1999 and became a blockbuster at the box office.

== Plot ==
Devi, a Nagini from the Nagaloka comes to Earth on the day of an eclipse with her friends to perform a special pooja. Naginis must return before the eclipse starts, otherwise, they lose their power until the eclipse completes. However, Devi is distracted by Dantra, an evil Naga who had been punished by Nagadeva, the righteous snake king, earlier and was sent to hell as a punishment. Dantra imprisons Devi with fire during the eclipse while her other friends return to Nagaloka before the eclipse.

Devi is saved by Suseela's father who is killed by Dantra in the process. Devi decides to save Suseela from her relatives as an act of reciprocation. She plans to marry Suseela with her cousin Raghava but they are unaware of their relationship. Raghava and Suseela fall in love. Devi patches the broken relationship between their families and they get married.

Nagadeva appears before Devi and commands her to return to Nagaloka. Devi refuses as she intends to stay back to protect Suseela. She promises Nagadeva that she would return once Suseela gives birth to a child because the child would be a Godly blessed one which saves Sussela from Dantra. Nagadeva accepts and gives her power which can even bring back the lost life. Vijay, Raghava's younger brother loves Devi but she avoids him.

In the meantime, Suseela becomes pregnant and everyone is happy. Dantra, with the help of another evil, imprisons Devi for a while and attacks Suseela. Suseela falls from the stairs, injures herself and the baby dies after getting hit. Devi with the help of Nagadeva's power resurrects the baby. Suseela gives birth to a boy and on its naming ceremony, Dantra confronts Devi that the child was born at an inauspicious time therefore, Raghava's life is under threat. Devi postpones her departure to Nagaloka as a result.

In order to save Raghava, Devi makes Sussela perform pooja to the eight manifestations of Goddess Lakshmi. They bless Sussela to have a long life with her husband. Devi appears before them and informs them about Dantra's curse. They offer Devi a solution. When someone performs a pooja for goddess Durga in Himalayas, she will protect her from all the evils. As humans can't survive in the heights of the Himalayas for long, Devi decides to perform the pooja on behalf of Suseela. However, the Ashta Lakshmis tell her that she is not eligible for the task, as only a member of Suseela's family can perform the pooja.

Devi asks Suseela to perform pooja in her home for nine days continuously and leaves. Devi marries Vijay hurriedly and leaves for the Himalayas without his knowledge. Vijay shares his joy with his family but no one believes him. He goes in search of Devi, who is at a small Durga shrine in the mountains. Devi is about to complete her pooja but on the final day (which happens to be a day of the solar eclipse), before Durga appears in front of her, Dantra imprisons Vijay and compels Devi to come out of the temple. The eclipse starts and Devi loses her power. She reveals herself to Vijay who helps her to reach the temple.

Devi performs the final pooja. Dantra disguises himself as Raghava and arrives at Suseela's home. He asks her to come to bed but she resists. Vijay and Raghava (Dantra) confront each other. Devi, disappointed that Durga didn't appear, commits suicide by burning herself. Durga appears, resurrects Devi from her ashes, and helps Devi to kill Dantra, and Raghava is saved by his friend. Nagadeva arrives and Devi bids adieu and leaves. Vijay feels for Devi. Suddenly, Nagadeva appears again and gives back Devi to him as she is not an unmarried Nagini anymore.

== Cast ==
- Prema as Devi, The Snake Princess
- Vanitha as Suseela, Vijay's sister-in-law and Raghava's wife
- Shiju as Vijay, Raghava's younger brother
- Abu Salim as Dantra
  - Master Mahendra as Young Dantra
- Bhanuchander as Raghava, Vijay's elder brother
- Sowkar Janaki as Vijay's grandmother
- Babu Mohan as Servant
- Kota Shankar Rao
- Krishnaveni Veni

== Production ==
M. S. Raju who was reeling under the failure of Street Fighter decided to make a devotional film with a new star cast. He cast Kannada actress Prema and Malayalam actor Shiju in the main roles. Abu Salim, a police officer from Mangalore was selected for the negative role, while Vanitha, daughter of actor Vijayakumar was selected to play an important character.

== Soundtrack ==
Devi

Soundtrack album by Devi Sri Prasad
- Released: 1999
- Recorded: 1999
- Genre: Soundtrack
- Length: 30:11 / 29:09
- Language: Telugu / Tamil
- Label: Lahari Music
- Producer: Devi Sri Prasad

Devi Sri Prasad chronology
Devi (1999)	Navvuthu Bathakalira (2001)

The music is composed by Devi Sri Prasad making his debut at the age of 19 and he is the youngest music composer as a debutant after Yuvan Shankar Raja who made his first film at the age of 16. The audio was launched at Hotel Savera, Chennai on 25 November 1998.

All lyrics are written by Jonnavittula Ramalingeswara Rao.

Telugu Track-List
No.	Title	Singer(s)	Length
1.	"Anantha Divya"	S. P. Balasubrahmanyam	1:59
2.	"Bangaru"	Chorus	1:43
3.	"Bhuvi Erugadi"	S. P. Balasubrahmanyam	1:13
4.	"Kumkuma Poola"	K. S. Chithra, S. P. Balasubrahmanyam	5:32
5.	"Nee Navve"	Sumangali, S. P. Balasubrahmanyam	4:40
6.	"Paathala Lokhame"	S. P. Balasubrahmanyam	1:52
7.	"Pralayaagni"	S. P. Balasubrahmanyam	1:34
8.	"Rama Chilukala"	Anuradha Sriram, S. P. Balasubrahmanyam	4:09
9.	"Sarvani Rudhrani"	K. S. Chithra	4:09
10.	"Sthree Janmaku"	Anuradha Sriram, S. P. Balasubrahmanyam	1:25
11.	"Veyyi Padagala"	Swarnalatha	1:55
Total length:			30:11

All lyrics are written by Vaali.

Tamil Track-List
No.	Title	Singer(s)	Length
1.	"Anantha Divya Shakthi Kai"	S. P. Balasubrahmanyam	1:59
2.	"Adi Penn Padamadhe"	Chorus	1:38
3.	"Thalai Meedhu Nagame"	S. P. Balasubrahmanyam	1:09
4.	"Kumkuma Poovin"	S. P. Balasubrahmanyam, K. S. Chithra	5:26
5.	"Then Poove"	S. P. Balasubrahmanyam, Sumangali	4:31
6.	"Andha Divya Sakthi"	S.P. Balu	1:54
7.	"Om Sakthi Om Sakthi"	S. P. Balasubrahmanyam	1:29
8.	"Devi Arul En" (Bit)	S. P. Balasubrahmanyam, Anuradha Sriram	1:20
9.	"Nallodu Vedhamum"	K. S. Chithra	1:49
10.	"Devi Arul En"	S. P. Balasubrahmanyam, Anuradha Sriram	4:00
11.	"Seevani Rudhrani"	K. S. Chithra	4:05
Total length:			29:09

== Release ==
The film was dubbed into Hindi and Tamil. All the three versions became successful at the box office.

== Awards ==
- 1999: Nandi Award for Best Child Actor - Master Mahendra – won
