= Srikaram =

- Title card
- Directed by: C. Uma Maheswara Rao
- Screenplay by: C. Uma Maheswara Rao
- Story by: C. Umamaheswara Rao
- Produced by: Gavara Parthasaradhi
- Starring: Jagapathi Babu; Heera Rajagopal; Meghana
- Cinematography: K. Shankar
- Edited by: K. Ravindra Babu
- Music by: Ilaiyaraaja
- Production company: Sri Chamundi Chitra
- Release date: 19 April 1996
- Running time: 135 mins
- Country: India
- Language: Telugu

Srikaram (transl. Beginning) is a 1996 Telugu-language drama film, produced by Gavara Parthasaradhi under the Sri Chamundi Chitra banner and directed by C. Uma Maheswara Rao. It stars Jagapathi Babu, Heera Rajagopal, Meghana and music composed by Ilaiyaraaja. The film won two Nandi Awards.

== Cast ==
- Jagapathi Babu as Siva
- Heera Rajagopal as Geeta
- Meghana/Aboli Patil as Vasantha
- Anand as Chandram
- Satyanarayana as Shantha Murthy
- Nutan Prasad as Adavocate Prasad
- Benerjee
- Venu Madhav
- Gundu Hanumantha Rao as Masterji
- Ananth Babu
- Gowtham Raju
- Jackie
- Ramjagan as Jagan
- Chitti
- K.L.Prasad
- Jwalamukhi
- Ayesha Jalil as Janaki
- Amurtha as Saraswathi
- Swathi
- Ratnamala
- Madhabala
- Shobharani
- Tenali Shakunthala
- Baby Syreshta

== Soundtrack ==
Srikaram

Film score by Ilaiyaraaja
- Released: 1996
- Genre: Soundtrack
- Length: 30:50
- Label: MG Magna Sound
- Producer: Ilaiyaraaja

Music composed by Ilaiyaraaja. Music released on MG Magna Sound Audio Company.

No.	Title	Lyrics	Singer(s)	Length
1.	"Malle Poovula Panupulo"	Sirivennela Sitarama Sastry	Chitra	4:41
2.	"Manasu Kastha"	Sirivennela Sitarama Sastry	K. J. Yesudas	4:31
3.	"Kasumane Kopam"	Jaladi	S. P. Balasubrahmanyam, Chitra	5:24
4.	"Nityam Raguluthunna"	Sirivennela Sitarama Sastry	K.J. Yesudas	4:42
5.	"Magavadini Nenu"	Sirivennela Sitarama Sastry	Mano	5:36
6.	"Guppu Guupulade"	Jaladi	Mano, Preethi, Devi	4:48
7.	"Srikaram"	Jaladi	Chorus	1:08
Total length:				30:50

== Awards ==
Nandi Awards - 1996

- Third Best Feature Film - Bronze - G. Partha Sarathi
- Best Lyricist - Sirivennela Sitarama Sastry
