= Varsham (2004 film) =

2004 Telugu film by Sobhan

- Poster
- Directed by: Sobhan
- Screenplay by: M.S. Raju
- Dialogues by: Paruchuri Brothers
- Story by: Veeru Potla
- Produced by: M.S. Raju
- Starring: Prabhas; Gopichand; Trisha
- Cinematography: S. Gopal Reddy
- Edited by: K. V. Krishna Reddy
- Music by: Devi Sri Prasad
- Production company: Sumanth Art Productions
- Release date: 14 January 2004
- Running time: 159 minutes
- Country: India
- Language: Telugu
- Box office: ₹21 crore distributors' share

Varsham (transl. Rain) is a 2004 Indian Telugu-language romantic action film directed by Sobhan and produced by M.S. Raju under the Sumanth Art Productions banner. The film stars Prabhas and Trisha in the lead roles, while, Gopichand, Prakash Raj, Paruchuri Venkateswara Rao, and Chandra Mohan appear in supporting roles. The music was composed by Devi Sri Prasad, while the cinematography was handled by S. Gopal Reddy.

Varsham emerged as a blockbuster, marking a breakthrough for Prabhas and establishing Trisha as a leading actress in Telugu cinema. It collected a distributor's share of ₹21 crore at the box office and became the second-highest Telugu grossing film of 2004. The film was dubbed in Tamil as Singamagan. The film's success led to remakes in Tamil as Mazhai (2005) and again in Hindi as Baaghi (2016).

== Plot ==
Venkat, an unemployed youth, meets Sailaja, a middle-class woman, on a train journey to Warangal. They bond instantly after dancing together in a sudden rainstorm. During the same time, Sailaja attracts the attention of Bhadranna, a ruthless and influential factionist leader who becomes obsessed with her. Venkat and Sailaja encounter each other repeatedly, each meeting marked by unexpected rainfall, and gradually fall in love.

Sailaja's selfish father, Ranga Rao, is approached by Bhadranna with a marriage proposal for Sailaja, and he readily accepts. However, when a film producer named Seenayya offers Sailaja an opportunity to act in his film, Ranga Rao realizes that acting is far more lucrative. To clear the path for her acting career, Ranga Rao creates misunderstandings between Venkat and Sailaja, causing them to break up. Ranga Rao then relocates to the city with Sailaja, while a heartbroken Venkat moves to Vizag to work with his uncle Chandram as a quarry demolition expert.

Meanwhile, Sailaja rises to stardom as a successful actress. Having been scammed by Ranga Rao, Bhadranna tracks Sailaja down, kidnaps her, and attempts to force her into marriage. With shooting brought to a halt, a desperate Seenayya seeks Venkat's help on Ranga Rao's suggestion, knowing Venkat's resourcefulness. Venkat agrees to rescue Sailaja to fund Chandram's bypass surgery. Reuniting with his friends, Venkat sneaks into Bhadranna's mansion with the help of them and rescues Sailaja, battling Bhadranna's henchmen in a intense battle, and escape from there.

After escaping, Venkat meets Ranga Rao and hands Sailaja to him; she learns the truth behind her father's deception when he boasts about it to Venkat, clears her misunderstandings with him, and the two reconcile. Enraged by the escape, Bhadranna murders his half-brother Kasi for failing to secure Sailaja. Seeking vengeance, Bhadranna tracks the couple to a local festival in Warangal and stabs Venkat during the celebrations. Despite his injuries, Venkat overpowers Bhadranna. As Venkat and Sailaja embrace, a burning effigy of Ravana collapses onto the defeated Bhadranna, killing him. With the threat eliminated, Venkat and Sailaja happily reunite as rain begins to fall once again.

== Cast ==
- Prabhas as Venkat
- Gopichand as Bhadranna
- Trisha as Kola Sailaja "Sailu"
- Ramya Krishna as Raja Lakshmi, Venkat's mother
- Mukesh Rishi as Dhanraj, Venkat's father
- Paruchuri Venkateswara Rao as Sivayya, Bhadranna's uncle
- Chandra Mohan as Chandram, Venkat's uncle
- Nalini as Swarnakka, Bhadranna's aunt
- Sudha as Lakshmi, Venkat's aunt
- Geetha as Janaki, Bhadranna's mother
- Sayaji Shinde as Peddiraju, Bhadranna's father
- Prakash Raj as Kola Ranga Rao, Sailu's father
- Sangeetha as Bharathi, Sailu's mother
- Brahmanandam as Rama Chandra Murthy, Venkat's friend
- Sunil as Jagan
- Ajay as Ajay, Venkat's friend
- Shafi as Kaasi
- Satyam Rajesh as Salim, Venkat's friend
- Suma as Swapna, Venkat's sister
- Sivaji Raja as Srinivas, Venkat's brother-in-law
- Pavala Syamala as Mutyalu, Sailu's grandmother
- K. Viswanath as Ramachandraiah, Sailu's grandfather
- Venu Madhav as Director
- Jaya Prakash Reddy as Producer Seenayya
- M. S. Narayana as Priest Narayana
- Gundu Hanumantha Rao as Priest Hanumantha
- Narra Venkateswara Rao as Home Minister
- Mallikarjuna Rao as Bus Passenger from marriage
- AVS as Bus Passenger from marriage
- Raghu Babu as Raghu, Bhadranna's henchman
- Dharmavarapu Subramanyam as Gaali Gannaarao
- Narsing Yadav as Bus Driver
- Rajitha as Bus Passenger from marriage
- Vamshi Paidipally as Bus Passenger

== Soundtrack ==
Varsham

Soundtrack album by Devi Sri Prasad
- Released: 2003
- Recorded: 2003
- Genre: Soundtrack
- Length: 30:18
- Language: Telugu
- Label: Aditya Music
- Producer: Devi Sri Prasad

Devi Sri Prasad chronology
Ice (2003)	Varsham (2003)	Venky (2004)

Music was composed by Devi Sri Prasad and all lyrics were penned by Sirivennela Seetaaraama Saastry. Music was released on Aditya Music. Soundtrack album was released on 18 December 2003 through Aditya Music at the film's audio launch event at Annapurna Studios, Hyderabad. NaChaKi of Telugu Cinema wrote "DeviSri Prasad comes up with songs that can be elevated by visuals, but also can stand by themselves. Most numbers are mass-oriented and he uses his orchestra deftly to create the moods for the songs. Particular mention of the lyrics is surely necessary for this album. Seetarama Sastry penned all the lyrics and adds another 'single-card' to his credit. What is worth mentioning is his rendition of mass-oriented songs in a freely flowing, catchy manner using simple words and some words that are getting extinct, so to say!"

Track-List
No.	Title	Singer(s)	Length
1.	"Nuvvosthanante"	K. S. Chithra, Raqeeb Alam	5:33
2.	"Mellaga (Ee Varsham Saakshiga)"	S. P. B. Charan, Sumangali	5:21
3.	"Nachave Nizam Pori"	Adnan Sami, Suneeta Rao	4:12
4.	"Langa Voni"	Tippu, Usha	3:54
5.	"Neeti Mullai"	Sagar, Sumangali	1:22
6.	"Kopama"	Karthik, Shreya Ghoshal	4:52
7.	"Joole Joole"	Mallikarjun, Kalpana	5:04
Total length:			30:18

== Release ==
=== Reception ===
Jeevi of Idlebrain.com wrote, "It's a love story with good technical values. You may definitely watch this film". A critic for Sify wrote, "The major drawback of Varsham is the second half, which has an overdose of violence, and the narration is marred by two dream songs. The director, Shobhan, loses grip on the story after the fast paced first half. Still Varsham is worth a look".

=== Box office ===
The film celebrated a 50-day run in 125 centers and the film celebrated its silver jubilee (175 days) celebration with Chiranjeevi attending as the chief guest.

=== Re-release ===
This movie was re-released on 11 November 2022 with a 4K resolution.

== Awards and nominations ==
Awards	Category	Nominee	Result	Ref.
Nandi Awards	Best Female Playback Singer	K. S. Chithra (for song "Nuvvostanante Nenoddantana ")	Won	
Nandi Awards	Best Choreographer	Prabhu Deva	Won	
Nandi Awards	Best Audiographer	Madhusudan Reddy	Won	
52nd Filmfare Awards South	Best Film	Varsham (M. S. Raju)	Won	
52nd Filmfare Awards South	Best Actor	Prabhas	Nominated	
52nd Filmfare Awards South	Best Actress	Trisha	Won	
52nd Filmfare Awards South	Best Villain	Gopichand	Nominated	
52nd Filmfare Awards South	Best Music Director	Devi Sri Prasad	Won	
52nd Filmfare Awards South	Best Female Playback Singer	K. S. Chithra (for song "Nuvvostanante Nenoddantana")	Won	
52nd Filmfare Awards South	Best Cinematographer	S. Gopal Reddy	Won	
CineMAA Awards	Best Film	Varsham (M. S. Raju)	Won	
CineMAA Awards	Sensational Hero	Prabhas	Won	
CineMAA Awards	Best Actress	Trisha	Won	
CineMAA Awards	Best Villain	Gopichand	Won	
CineMAA Awards	Best Choreographer	Prabhu Deva	Won	
CineMAA Awards	Best Music Director	Devi Sri Prasad	Won	
CineMAA Awards	Best Cinematographer	S. Gopal Reddy	Won	
Santosham Film Awards	Best Film	Varsham (M. S. Raju)	Won	
Santosham Film Awards	Best Actress	Trisha	Won	
Santosham Film Awards	Best Young Performer	Prabhas	Won	
Santosham Film Awards	Best Music Director	Devi Sri Prasad	Won	
Santosham Film Awards	Best Female Playback Singer	K. S. Chithra (for song "Nuvvosthanante")	Won	
Santosham Film Awards	Best Lyricist	Sirivennela Sitarama Sastry	Won	
Santosham Film Awards	Best Cinematographer	S. Gopal Reddy	Won	
Santosham Film Awards	Best Choreographer	Prabhu Deva	Won	
Santosham Film Awards	Best Screenplay	M. S. Raju	Won	
Santosham Film Awards	Best Dialogue	Paruchuri Brothers	Won	

Awards
Preceded by Okkadu	Filmfare Best Film Award (Telugu); 2004	Succeeded by Nuvvostanante Nenoddantana
