= Nuvvostanante Nenoddantana =

2005 Indian film by Prabhu Deva

- Theatrical release poster
- Directed by: Prabhu Deva
- Screenplay by: M. S. Raju
- Story by: Veeru Potla
- Dialogue by: Paruchuri brothers
- Produced by: M. S. Raju
- Starring: Srihari; Siddharth; Trisha
- Cinematography: Venu
- Edited by: K. V. Krishna Reddy
- Music by: Devi Sri Prasad
- Production company: Sumanth Art Productions
- Distributed by: Sumanth Arts
- Release date: 14 January 2005
- Running time: 161 minutes
- Country: India
- Language: Telugu

Nuvvostanante Nenoddantana (Note: Spelt as Nuvvosthanante Nenoddantaana on the CBFC certificate.) (pronounced [nuvːostaːnaṇʈeː neːnodːaṇʈaːnaː]; transl. If you wish to come, would I refuse?) is a 2005 Indian Telugu-language romantic comedy film directed by Prabhu Deva in his directorial debut and produced by M. S. Raju under Sumanth Art Productions. The film stars Srihari, Siddharth, and Trisha. The music was composed by Devi Sri Prasad, with cinematography by Venu. The film's title was inspired by the song of the same name from Varsham (2004), sung by K. S. Chithra.

The film won nine Filmfare Awards South (including Best Film) and five Nandi Awards. The film was remade in nine other languages—the highest for any Indian film. The film also holds the distinction of receiving the most Filmfare Awards by any South Indian film.

== Plot ==
Siri is a traditional rural girl from Andhra Pradesh who was brought up by her elder brother, Sivaramakrishna. Twenty years prior, their rich father married another woman and kicked out the two kids and their mother, humiliating them as they went. Shortly afterwards, their mother died, leaving 13-year-old Sivaramakrishna to take care of infant Siri alone.

Sivaramakrishna had his mother's grave built on a small plot of farmland the siblings inherited, but the Zamindar Muddu Krishnayya asserted that the land belonged to him, since their mother had not repaid a loan she took out with him. Muddu Krishnayya insisted that the grave be removed, but Sivaramakrishna begged him for the chance to pay off the loan, promising to work day and night working the farm, as long as they didn't tear down his mother's grave. Muddu Krishnayya agreed when the local station master agreed to provide security. Slowly, Sivaramakrishna turned the tide, working hard to raise his sister and become a successful farmer. Meanwhile, Siri went to school and eventually got her engineering degree in a nearby town.

In the present day, Lalitha, Siri's best friend from their early school days comes to town to invite Siri to her house to help her get ready for her wedding. Reluctantly, as they had never been apart long, Sivaramakrishna agrees to send Siri two weeks ahead of the marriage. Lalitha's cousin, Santosh, a cheerful boy brought up in London, born to millionaire parents Janaki and Prakash, also arrives on the same day with his mother.

At first, Siri is aggravated by Santosh, as he teases and flirts with her often. But soon, she grows to appreciate his sweet nature, while Santosh admires how humble and caring she is. Santosh and Siri fall in love and agree with each other to get married.

Santosh's mother, Janaki finds out that Santosh has fallen in love with Siri, but she doesn't accept their relationship as Siri comes from a poor family, believing Siri to be below their standards. Janaki also promises Santosh to be married to Dolly, the wealthy daughter of her brother's business partner, JP. On the day of the wedding, while Santosh is away running an errand, Sivaramakrishna arrives, and Janaki humiliates both him and Siri, accusing the two of trying to entice and trap Santosh. Sivaramakrishna is enraged at the accusation but leaves with a tearful Siri without settling the score out of love for Lalitha, not wanting to disrupt her wedding.

When Santosh learns what happened, he refuses to go back to London with his mother as he promised. He instead goes to Siri's house to apologize and to plead with Sivaramakrishna to accept him for Siri. Sivaramakrishna is highly distrustful of Santosh, knowing well from experience with his own father that rich folk can turn their backs on their family, but the station master convinces Sivaramakrishna to give Santosh a chance, just like he was given a chance by Krishnayya when he was a child. Santosh is asked to prove himself by working on the farm. He accepts the challenge to grow more barrels of grain than Sivaramakrishna by the end of the season and agrees to leave the village forever and never see Siri again if he does not.

Krishnayya is not happy as he wants Siri to marry his son. Krishnayya, his son, Dolly, and her father, JP, all try to get Santosh to lose the competition, trying to sabotage Santosh's work, and Santosh has to work hard for his love. As a city boy growing up in the lap of luxury, he finds it hard to adjust to the demanding nature of work on the farm and learning how to do it all for the first time, but he works tirelessly for Siri and grows to love the simple life on the farm and in the village. Though icy at first, Sivaramakrishna grows to see how much Santosh loves Siri. In spite of many antics from Krishnayya's and JP's side, Santosh succeeds in growing more grain than Sivaramakrishna and earning his approval.

At the moment of celebration, Krishnayya and his men kidnap Siri and try to force her to marry his son. A fight erupts when Sivaramakrishna and Santosh find them and try to save Siri. In a moment of frenzy, as Krishnayya's son forces Siri to the ground, Santosh buries a knife in his neck, killing him. Having grown to love Santosh, Sivaramakrishna takes the blame for the murder.

After spending five years in prison, on the day Sivaramakrishna is released, he finds Santosh and Siri waiting for him at the gate in wedding attire. They reveal that they didn't think it right to get married without Sivaramakrishna there. Prakash and Janaki also accompany them, and Janaki pays him her respects, giving both apology for the way she treated him and thanks for the sacrifice he made for her son.

Finally, Siri and Santosh joyfully get married in everyone's presence.

== Legacy ==
Nuvvostanante Nenoddantana is regarded as one of the landmark Telugu romantic films of the 2000s. The film marked the directorial debut of Prabhu Deva and established him as a successful filmmaker before he went on to direct films across Telugu, Tamil and Hindi cinema. It also played a significant role in consolidating Siddharth's career in Telugu cinema following his debut in Boys (2003). The film's soundtrack, composed by Devi Sri Prasad, became highly popular and continues to be remembered for songs such as "Ghal Ghal", "Chandrullo Unde" and "Paripoke Pitta". The film achieved lasting recognition for being remade in nine languages, the highest number of remakes for an Indian film, with several adaptations becoming commercial successes in their respective industries. It has continued to be revisited in retrospective articles and was re-released in theatres in 2025 owing to its enduring popularity.

== Cast ==
- Srihari as Sivaramakrishna
- Siddharth as Santosh
- Trisha as Siri, Sivaramakrishna's sister (voice dubbed by Savitha Reddy)
- Veda as Lalitha "Lalli", Siri's best friend and Santosh's cousin (voice dubbed by Sunitha)
- Prakash Raj as Prakash, Santosh's father
- Santhoshi as Gowri
- Geetha as Janaki, Santosh's mother (voice dubbed by Roja Ramani)
- Sunil as Banda
- Tanikella Bharani as Kantepudi Srinivasa Rao
- Nanditha Jennifer as Dolly
- Jaya Prakash Reddy as JP, Srinivasa Rao's business partner and Dolly's father
- Paruchuri Venkateswara Rao as Venkatachalam, Station Master
- Chandra Mohan as Chandram, Jailor
- Narsing Yadav as Narasimha
- Ajay as Lalli's blackmailer
- Dharmavarapu Subramanyam as Udayagiri Subbarao
- Narra Venkateswara Rao as Muddu Krishnayya
- Raghu Babu as Tempo Rao
- Sana as Lalli's mother
- Gundu Hanumantha Rao as a priest
- Pavala Syamala as the grandmother
- Abhishek as Muddu Krishnayya's son
- Master Nandu as young Sivarama Krishna
- Prabhu Deva as the bullock cart driver in the song "Paripoke Pitta" (special appearance)
- M. S. Raju in a special appearance (atop a jeep in "Chandrullo Unde")

== Production ==
The story of Nuvvostanante Nenoddantana was written by Veeru Potla, while the screenplay was penned by producer M. S. Raju. The dialogues were written by the Paruchuri brothers. The film has drawn comparisons to the 1989 Hindi film Maine Pyar Kiya and the 1996 Telugu film Ramudochadu, with similarities in their plots and themes.

M. S. Raju brought in Prabhu Deva, who choreographed the song "Nuvvostanante" in his production Varsham, to direct the film although Deva was hesitant to direct a film. Raju initially wanted to name the film O Prema Nuvvostanante Nenoddantana, but decided against it because the title was relatively long. Siddharth was cast after Raju liked his performance in Boys (2003) and wanted to cast someone who was underexposed in the industry.

== Soundtrack ==
Nuvvostanante Nenoddantana

Soundtrack album by Devi Sri Prasad
- Released: 21 December 2004
- Recorded: 2004
- Genre: Film soundtrack
- Length: 32:31
- Language: Telugu
- Label: Aditya Music
- Producer: Devi Sri Prasad

Devi Sri Prasad chronology
Naa Alludu (2004)	Nuvvostanante Nenoddantana (2004)	Thirupaachi (2005)

The soundtrack features eight songs composed by Devi Sri Prasad. The soundtrack featured a remixed version of the song "Prema Kosamai Valalo" sung by Ghantasala for the 1951 film Pathala Bhairavi. This version was sung by Jr. Ghantasala. All lyrics were penned by Sirivennela Seetharama Sastry.

No.	Title	Singer(s)	Length
1.	"Chandrulo Unde"	Shankar Mahadevan	4:17
2.	"Something Something"	Tippu	5:35
3.	"Niluvaddam"	Karthik, Sumangali	5:59
4.	"Paripoke Pitta"	Mallikarjun, Sagar	3:40
5.	"Prema Kosamai Valalo (Remix)"	Ghantasala	2:11
6.	"Ghal Ghal"	S. P. Balasubrahmanyam	5:20
7.	"Padam Kadalanantundha"	Sagar	1:12
8.	"Adhire Adhire"	Jassie Gift, Kalpana Raghavendar	4:17

== Release ==
The film was released with 90 prints on 14 January 2005; more prints were added later to meet the public demand. It was one of the biggest hits of 2005 in Telugu cinema. The film ran for 50 days in 79 centres and 100 days in 35 centres, becoming a blockbuster in Telugu cinema. After the film's success, Siddharth shifted his focus to Telugu films.

== Reception ==
Sify which rated the film 3/5, stated that, "Nuvvostanante Nenoddantana a real treat and a joy to watch on screen." The reviewer praising performances of the cast, wrote: "Although the characters are built on obvious cliches, the charming performance of artists bring these seemingly archetypes to life". Idlebrain.com rated 4/5 and opined, "Screenplay provided by MS Raju is gripping. He made sure that there is no dull moment throughout the film. Direction by Prabhudeva is really good."

== Accolades ==
Award (Note: Awards, festivals and organizations are in alphabetical order.)	Date of ceremony (Note: Date is linked to the article about the awards held that year, wherever possible.)	Category	Recipient(s)	Result	Ref.
Filmfare Awards South	9 September 2006	Best Film – Telugu	Nuvvostanante Nenoddantana – Sumanth Art Productions	Won	
Filmfare Awards South	9 September 2006	Best Director – Telugu	Prabhu Deva	Nominated	
Filmfare Awards South	9 September 2006	Best Choreography	Prabhu Deva	Won	
Filmfare Awards South	9 September 2006	Best Actor – Telugu	Siddharth	Won	
Filmfare Awards South	9 September 2006	Best Actress – Telugu	Trisha	Won	
Filmfare Awards South	9 September 2006	Best Supporting Actor – Telugu	Srihari	Won	
Filmfare Awards South	9 September 2006	Best Supporting Actress – Telugu	Archana Shastry	Nominated	
Filmfare Awards South	9 September 2006	Best Comedian – Telugu	Sunil	Nominated	
Filmfare Awards South	9 September 2006	Best Music Director – Telugu	Devi Sri Prasad	Won	
Filmfare Awards South	9 September 2006	Best Background Score – Telugu	Devi Sri Prasad	Won	
Filmfare Awards South	9 September 2006	Best Lyricist – Telugu	Sirivennela Seetharama Sastry – (for "Ghal Ghal (Akasam Thakela)")	Won	
Filmfare Awards South	9 September 2006	Best Lyricist – Telugu	Sirivennela Seetharama Sastry – (for "Chandrulo Unde")	Nominated	
Filmfare Awards South	9 September 2006	Best Male Playback Singer – Telugu	Shankar Mahadevan – (for "Chandrulo Unde")	Won	
Filmfare Awards South	9 September 2006	Best Male Playback Singer – Telugu	S. P. Balasubrahmanyam – (for "Ghal Ghal (Akasam Thakela)")	Nominated	
Filmfare Awards South	9 September 2006	Best Male Playback Singer – Telugu	Tippu – (for "Something Something")	Nominated	
Nandi Awards	2006	Akkineni Award for Best Home-viewing Feature Film	Nuvvostanante Nenoddantana – Sumanth Art Productions	Won	
Nandi Awards	2006	Best Actress	Trisha	Won	
Nandi Awards	2006	Best Supporting Actor	Srihari	Won	
Nandi Awards	2006	Best Female Comedian	Santhoshi	Won	
Nandi Awards	2006	Best Art Director	Vivek	Won	
Santosham Film Awards	6 August 2006	Best Music Director	Devi Sri Prasad	Won	

== Remakes ==
This film was highly successful and was remade in nine languages, the highest number of remakes for an Indian film in other languages.

1. Kannada as Neenello Naanalle (2006)
2. Tamil as Unakkum Enakkum (2006)
3. Bengali as I Love You (2007)
4. Manipuri as Ningol Thajaba (2007)
5. Odia as Suna Chadhei Mo Rupa Chadhei (2009)
6. Punjabi as Tera Mera Ki Rishta (2009)
7. Bangladeshi as Nissash Amar Tumi (2010)
8. Nepali as The Flash Back: Farkera Herda (2010)
9. Hindi as Ramaiya Vastavaiya (2013) directed by Prabhu Deva himself

== Notes ==
Awards
Preceded by Varsham	Filmfare Best Film Award (Telugu); 2005	Succeeded by Bommarillu
