= Sumanth Art Productions =

Telugu Films Productions Company

- Industry: Entertainment
- Headquarters: Hyderabad, Telangana, India
- Key people: M. S. Raju
- Products: Films
- Owner: M. S. Raju

Sumanth Art Productions is an Indian film production company in Hyderabad established by M. S. Raju. Films like Manasantha Nuvve (2001), Okkadu (2003), Varsham (2004), Nuvvostanante Nenoddantana (2005) were made under this banner. The first film made on the banner was Sathruvu (1991) starring Venkatesh.

== Film production ==
Year	Film	Director	Actors
1991	Sathruvu	Kodi Ramakrishna	Venkatesh, Vijayashanti
1993	Police Lockup	Kodi Ramakrishna	Vijayashanti, Vinod Kumar
1995	Street Fighter	B. Gopal	Vijayashanti
1999	Devi	Kodi Ramakrishna	Prema, Shiju, Bhanuchander, Vanitha Vijayakumar
2001	Devi Putrudu	Kodi Ramakrishna	Venkatesh, Anjala Zaveri, Soundarya
2001	Manasantha Nuvve	V. N. Aditya	Uday Kiran, Reema Sen
2002	Nee Sneham	Paruchuri Murali	Uday Kiran, Aarti Agarwal
2003	Okkadu	Gunasekhar	Mahesh Babu, Bhumika Chawla
2004	Varsham	Sobhan	Prabhas, Trisha Krishnan, Gopichand
2005	Nuvvostanante Nenoddantana	Prabhu Deva	Siddharth Narayan, Trisha Krishnan
2006	Pournami	Prabhu Deva	Prabhas, Charmy Kaur, Trisha Krishnan
2007	Aata	V. N. Aditya	Siddharth Narayan, Ileana D'Cruz
2008	Vaana	M. S. Raju	Vinay Rai, Meera Chopra
2009	Maska	B. Gopal	Ram Pothineni, Hansika Motwani, Sheela Kaur

== Awards ==
S.no	Year	Ceremony	Category	Nominee	Result
1	2003	Filmfare Awards	Filmfare Award for Best Film – Telugu	Okkadu	Won
2	2004	Filmfare Awards	Filmfare Award for Best Film – Telugu	Varsham	Won
3	2005	Filmfare Awards	Filmfare Award for Best Film – Telugu	Nuvvostanante Nenoddantana	Won
4	2003	Santosham Film Awards	Santosham Best Film Award	Okkadu	Won
5	2004	Santosham Film Awards	Santosham Best Film Award	Varsham	Won
6	2004	CineMAA Awards	Best Film	Okkadu	Won
7	2005	CineMAA Awards	Best Film	Varsham	Won
8	2003	Nandi Awards	Nandi Award for Best Feature Film-(Silver)	Okkadu	Won
9	2005	Nandi Awards	Best Home-Viewing Feature Film	Nuvvostanante Nenoddantana	Won
