= List of awards and nominations received by M. M. Keeravani =

M. M. Keeravani awards and nominations
Awards and nominations
| Award | Wins | Nominations |
| Golden Globe | 1 | 1 |
| Academy Awards | 1 | 1 |
| Broadcast Film Critics Association Awards | 1 | 1 |
| Chicago Film Critics Association | 0 | 1 |
| Los Angeles Film Critics Association | 1 | 1 |
| National Film Awards | 2 | 2 |
| Satellite Awards | 0 | 1 |
| Saturn Awards | 0 | 1 |
| Filmfare Awards South | 9 | 14 |
| Nandi Awards | 11 | 11 |
| Tamil Nadu State Film Awards | 1 | 1 |
| Santosham Film Awards | 1 | 1 |
| South Indian International Movie Awards | 2 | 7 |
| Hollywood Music in Media Awards | 0 | 1 |
| IIFA Utsavam | 0 | 1 |

Totals (Note: Certain award groups do not simply award one winner. They acknowledge several different recipients, have runners-up, and have third place. Since this is a specific recognition and is different from losing an award, runner-up mentions are considered wins in this award tally. For simplification and to avoid errors, each award in this list has been presumed to have had a prior nomination.)
- Wins: 32
- Nominations: 49

M. M. Keeravani is an Indian music composer, record producer, singer and lyricist, who predominantly works in Telugu cinema.

His accolades include, eleven Nandi Awards, eight Filmfare Awards, two National Film Awards, an Academy Award, a Golden Globe Award, a LAFCA Award and a Critics' Choice Movie Award. In 2023, the Government of India honoured him with the Padma Shri for his contributions towards Indian cinema.

== Awards and nominations ==
Name of the award ceremony, year presented, nominee(s) of the award, award category, and the result of the nomination
| Award ceremony | Year (Note: Indicates the year of ceremony. Each year is linked to the article about the awards held that year, wherever possible.) | Category | Work | Result | Ref. |
|---|---|---|---|---|---|
| Academy Awards | 2023 | Best Original Song | "Naatu Naatu" (from RRR) | Won | |
| Austin Film Critics Association | 2023 | Best Original Score | RRR | Nominated | |
| Boston Society of Film Critics | 2022 | Best Use of Music in a Film | RRR | Won | |
| Chicago Film Critics Association | 2022 | Best Original Score | RRR | Nominated | |
| Critics' Choice Movie Awards | 2023 | Best Song | "Naatu Naatu" (from RRR) | Won | |
| Filmfare Awards South | 1993 | Best Music Director – Telugu | Kshana Kshanam | Won | |
| Filmfare Awards South | 1994 | Best Music Director – Telugu | Allari Priyudu | Won | |
| Filmfare Awards South | 1995 | Best Music Director – Telugu | Criminal | Won | |
| Filmfare Awards South | 1996 | Best Music Director – Telugu | Subha Sankalpam | Won | |
| Filmfare Awards South | 1997 | Best Music Director – Telugu | Pelli Sandadi | Won | |
| Filmfare Awards South | 2006 | Best Music Director – Telugu | Chatrapathi | Nominated | |
| Filmfare Awards South | 2010 | Best Music Director – Telugu | Magadheera | Won | |
| Filmfare Awards South | 2011 | Best Music Director – Telugu | Vedam | Nominated | |
| Filmfare Awards South | 2012 | Best Music Director – Telugu | Rajanna | Nominated | |
| Filmfare Awards South | 2013 | Best Music Director – Telugu | Eega | Nominated | |
| Filmfare Awards South | 2016 | Best Music Director – Telugu | Baahubali: The Beginning | Nominated | |
| Filmfare Awards South | 2018 | Best Music Director – Telugu | Baahubali 2: The Conclusion | Won | |
| Filmfare Awards South | 2018 | Best Lyricist – Telugu | Baahubali 2: The Conclusion | Won | |
| Filmfare Awards South | 2024 | Best Music Director – Telugu | RRR | Won | |
| Golden Globe Awards | 2023 | Best Original Song | "Naatu Naatu" (from RRR) | Won | |
| Georgia Film Critics Association | 2022 | Best Original Song | "Naatu Naatu" (from RRR) | Runner-up | |
| Hollywood Music in Media Awards | 2022 | Best Original Score – Independent Film (Foreign Language) | RRR | Nominated | |
| IIFA Utsavam | 2016 | Best Music Direction | Baahubali: The Beginning | Nominated | |
| Los Angeles Film Critics Association | 2022 | Best Music | RRR | Won | |
| Nandi Awards | 1992 | Best Music Director | Rajeswari Kalyanam | Won | |
| Nandi Awards | 1993 | Best Music Director | Allari Priyudu | Won | |
| Nandi Awards | 1995 | Best Music Director | Pelli Sandadi | Won | |
| Nandi Awards | 2001 | Best Male Playback Singer | ("Ekkado Putti" from Student No: 1) | Won | |
| Nandi Awards | 2002 | Best Music Director | Okato Number Kurradu | Won | |
| Nandi Awards | 2005 | Best Music Director | Chatrapathi | Won | |
| Nandi Awards | 2009 | Best Music Director | Vengamamba | Won | |
| Nandi Awards | 2010 | Best Male Playback Singer | "Telugammayi" (from Maryada Ramanna) | Won | |
| Nandi Awards | 2012 | Best Music Director | Eega | Won | |
| Nandi Awards | 2015 | Best Music Director | Baahubali: The Beginning | Won | |
| Nandi Awards | 2015 | Best Male Playback Singer | Baahubali: The Beginning | Won | |
| National Film Awards | 1998 | Best Music Direction–Songs | Annamayya | Won | |
| National Film Awards | 2023 | Best Music Direction–Background Score | RRR | Won | |
| Santa Barbara International Film Festival | 2023 | Variety Artisans Award – Songwriter | RRR | Honored | |
| Santosham Film Awards | 2004 | Best Music Director | Gangotri | Won | |
| Satellite Awards | 2023 | Best Original Song | "Naatu Naatu" (from RRR) | Nominated | |
| Saturn Awards | 2016 | Best Music | Baahubali: The Beginning | Nominated | |
| South Indian International Movie Awards | 2011 | Best Music Director – Telugu | Rajanna | Nominated | |
| South Indian International Movie Awards | 2012 | Best Music Director – Telugu | Eega | Nominated | |
| South Indian International Movie Awards | 2015 | Best Music Director – Telugu | Baahubali: The Beginning | Nominated | |
| South Indian International Movie Awards | 2018 | Best Music Director – Telugu | Baahubali 2: The Conclusion | Won | |
| South Indian International Movie Awards | 2021 | Best Lyricist – Telugu | "Rajarshi" (from NTR: Kathanayakudu) | Nominated | |
| South Indian International Movie Awards | 2023 | Best Lyricist – Telugu | "Neetho Unte Chalo" (from Bimbisara) | Nominated | |
| South Indian International Movie Awards | 2023 | Best Music Director – Telugu | RRR | Won | |
| Tamil Nadu State Film Awards | 1991 | Best Music Director | Azhagan | Won | |

== Honours ==
| Year | Award | Honouring body | Ref |
|---|---|---|---|
| 2023 | Padma Shri | Government of India | |
