= M. M. Keeravani discography =

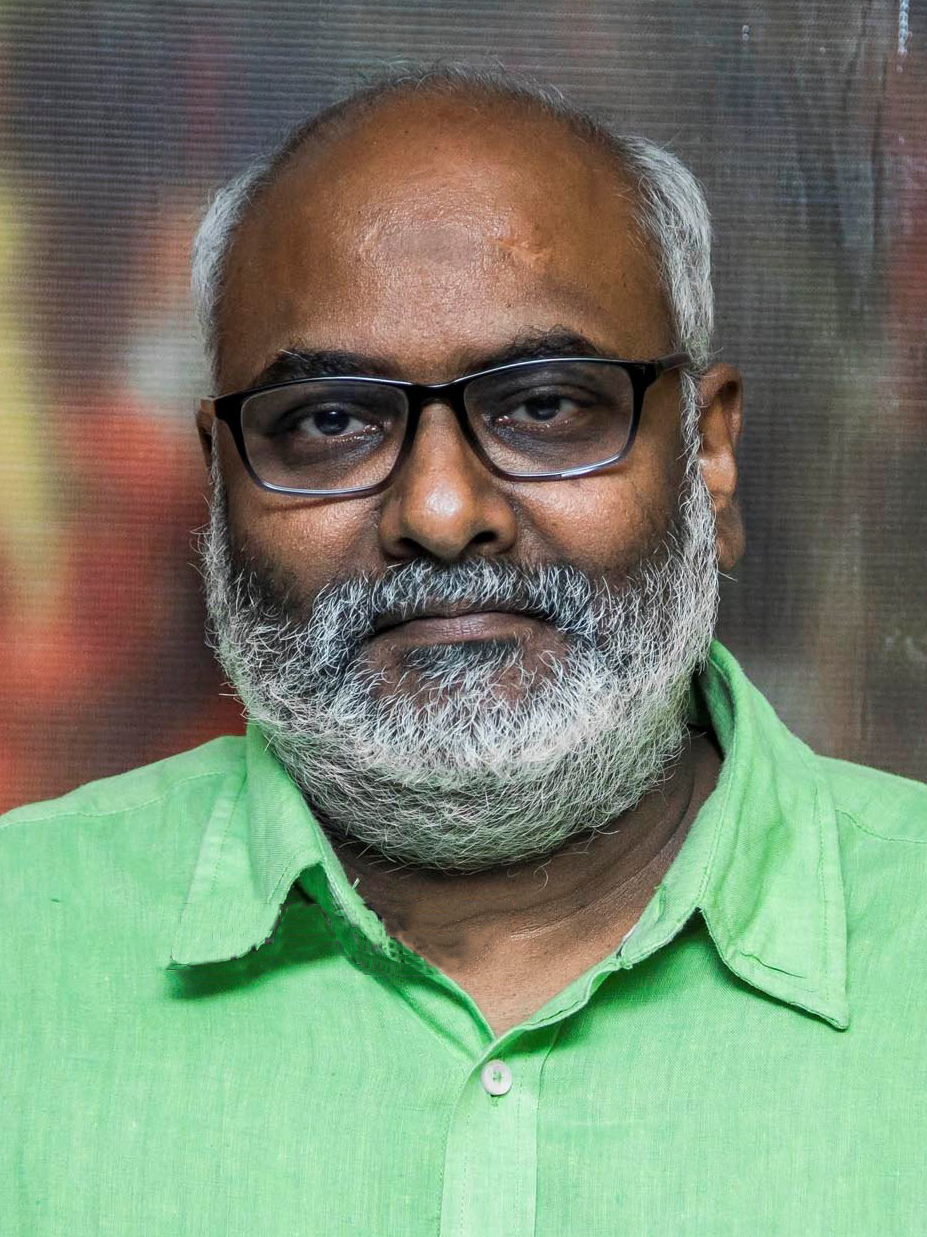
Keeravani in 2015

M. M. Keeravani is an Indian music composer, singer and lyricist, primarily associated with Telugu cinema. In a career spanning over three decades, Keeravani has composed music for over 190 films, primarily in Telugu, and some in Hindi, Tamil, Kannada, and Malayalam cinema.

== Composer ==
=== 1990s ===
| Year | Telugu | Tamil | Hindi | Kannada | Malayalam |
|---|---|---|---|---|---|
| 1990 | Manasu Mamatha • | | | | |
| 1990 | Dagudumuthala Dampathyam • | | | | |
| 1991 | Seetharamayya Gari Manavaralu • | | | | |
| 1991 | Jeevana Chadarangam • | | | | |
| 1991 | Attintlo Adde Mogudu • | | | | |
| 1991 | Amma • | | | | |
| 1991 | | Azhagan • | | | |
| 1991 | People's Encounter • | | | | |
| 1991 | | Nee Pathi Naan Pathi • | | | |
| 1991 | Mondi Mogudu Penki Pellam • | | | | |
| 1991 | Ashwini • | | | | |
| 1991 | | Paattondru Ketten • | | | |
| 1991 | Kshana Kshanam • | | | | |
| 1991 | | | | | Neelagiri |
| 1992 | Laati • | | | | |
| 1992 | Sahasam • | | | | |
| 1992 | | Sivantha Malar • | | | |
| 1992 | Hello Darling • | | | | |
| 1992 | Gharana Mogudu • | | | | |
| 1992 | Sundarakanda • | | | | |
| 1992 | | Sevagan • | | | |
| 1992 | President Gari Pellam • | | | | |
| 1992 | Agreement • | | | | |
| 1992 | Allari Mogudu • | | | | |
| 1992 | | Vaaname Ellai • | | | |
| 1992 | Aapadbandhavudu • | | | | |
| 1992 | | Jathi Malli • | | | |
| 1992 | | | | | Soorya Manasam • |
| 1993 | Mr. Pellam • | | | | |
| 1993 | Matru Devo Bhava • | | | | |
| 1993 | Rendilla Poojari • | | | | |
| 1993 | Chinna Alludu • | | | | |
| 1993 | Rowdy Mogudu • | | | | |
| 1993 | Puttinilla Mattinilla • | | | | |
| 1993 | Aadarsham • | | | | |
| 1993 | | Prathap • | | | |
| 1993 | Rajeswari Kalyanam • | | | | |
| 1993 | | | | Alimayya • | |
| 1993 | Allari Priyudu • | | | | |
| 1993 | Kondapalli Raja • | | | | |
| 1993 | Abbayigaru • | | | | |
| 1993 | Rakshana • | | | | |
| 1993 | Allari Alludu • | | | | |
| 1993 | Varasudu • | | | | |
| 1993 | Major Chandrakanth • | | | | |
| 1994 | Criminal • | | Criminal (1995) | | |
| 1994 | | | | Bhairava • | |
| 1994 | Allari Premikudu • | | | | |
| 1994 | Theerpu • | | | | |
| 1994 | Anna • | | | | |
| 1994 | Khaidi No. 1 • | Hero • | | | |
| 1994 | Angarakshakudu • | | | | |
| 1994 | Aavesam • | | | | |
| 1994 | | | | Swathi • | |
| 1994 | Boy Friend • | | | | |
| 1994 | Kishkindha Kanda• | | | | |
| 1994 | Yes Nenante Nene • | | | | |
| 1994 | S. P. Parasuram • | | | | |
| 1994 | Pelli Koduku • | | | | |
| 1994 | Gandeevam • | | | | |
| 1994 | Muddula Priyudu • | | | | |
| 1994 | Bobbili Simham • | | | | |
| 1994 | Subha Muhurtham • | | | | |
| 1995 | Subha Sankalpam • | | | | |
| 1995 | Gharana Bullodu • | | | | |
| 1995 | Gharana Alludu • | | | | |
| 1995 | Balaraju Bangaru Pellam • | | | | |
| 1995 | Aalu Magalu • | | | | |
| 1995 | Lady Boss • | | | | |
| 1995 | Rambantu • | | | | |
| 1995 | Mounam • | | | | |
| 1995 | Real Hero • | | | | |
| 1995 | Dear Brother • | | | | |
| 1996 | Pelli Sandadi • | | | | |
| 1996 | Sahasa Veerudu Sagara Kanya • | | | | |
| 1996 | | | Is Raat Ki Subah Nahin • | | |
| 1996 | Rayudugaru Nayudugaru • | | | | |
| 1996 | | | | Appaji • | |
| 1996 | Bombay Priyudu • | | | | |
| 1996 | Jabilamma Pelli • | | | | |
| 1996 | Pavithra Bandham • | | | | |
| 1996 | Priyaragalu • | | | | |
| 1996 | | | Pehli Nazar Mein (non-film album) • | | |
| 1996 | Devaraagam | | | | Devaraagam • |
| 1996 | | | | Karnataka Suputra• | |
| 1996 | Ardhaangi • | | | | |
| 1996 | Maina • | | | | |
| 1997 | Annamayya • | | | | |
| 1997 | Surya Putrulu • | | | | |
| 1997 | Osi Naa Maradala • | | | | |
| 1997 | Arundhati • | | | | |
| 1998 | W/o V. Vara Prasad • | | | | |
| 1998 | Raja Hamsa • | | | | |
| 1998 | | Kondattam • | | | |
| 1998 | Pandaga | | | | |
| 1998 | | | Zakhm • | | |
| 1998 | Paradesi • | | | | |
| 1998 | Pelli Kanuka • | | | | |
| 1998 | Sri Sita Ramula Kalyanam Chootamu Raarandi • | | | | |
| 1998 | | | Guzare Zamane (non-film album) • | | |
| 1998 | | | Coffee Aur Kreem (non-film album) • | | |
| 1999 | Seetharama Raju • | | | | |
| 1999 | Alludugaaru Vachcharu • | | | | |
| 1999 | Raghavaiah Gari Abbai • | | | | |
| 1999 | Mechanic Mavayya • | | | | |

=== 2000s ===
| Year | Telugu | Tamil | Hindi | Kannada |
|---|---|---|---|---|
| 2000 | Choosoddaam Randi • | | | |
| 2000 | | | Papa The Great (1 song only) | |
| 2000 | | | | Deepavali • |
| 2001 | Bava Nachadu • | | | |
| 2001 | Student No.1 • | Student Number 1 • (2003) | | |
| 2001 | | | | Sundara Kaanda • |
| 2001 | Akasa Veedhilo • | | | |
| 2002 | Okato Number Kurraadu • | | | |
| 2002 | Lahiri Lahiri Lahirilo • | | | |
| 2002 | | | Sur: The Melody of Life • | |
| 2002 | Evare Atagaadu • | | | |
| 2002 | | | | Jamindaru • |
| 2002 | Tappu Chesi Pappu Koodu • | | | |
| 2002 | Yuva Rathna • | | | |
| 2003 | Simhadri • | | | |
| 2003 | Okariki Okaru • | | | |
| 2003 | Ee Abbai Chala Manchodu • | | | |
| 2003 | Maa Alludu Very Good • | | | |
| 2003 | | | Jism • | |
| 2003 | Gangotri • | | | |
| 2003 | | | Saaya • (1 song only. Unused song from Zakhm included in Saaya). | |
| 2003 | Pilisthe Palukutha • | | | |
| 2003 | Seetayya • | | | |
| 2004 | Naa Autograph • | | | |
| 2004 | Nenunnanu • | | | |
| 2004 | Swamy • | | | |
| 2004 | Sye • | | | |
| 2004 | Letha Manasulu • | | | |
| 2004 | Varam • | | | |
| 2004 | Pallakilo Pellikoothuru • | | | |
| 2005 | Jagapati • | | | |
| 2005 | | | Rog • | |
| 2005 | Chhatrapati • | | | |
| 2005 | Anukokunda Oka Roju • | | | |
| 2005 | | | Paheli • | |
| 2005 | Allari Bullodu | | | |
| 2005 | | | Kasak • | |
| 2006 | Sri Ramadasu • | | | |
| 2006 | Vikramarkudu • | | | |
| 2006 | Amma Cheppindi • | | | |
| 2006 | Khatarnak • | | | |
| 2007 | Yamadonga • | | | |
| 2007 | | | Dhokha • | |
| 2007 | Bhookailas • | | | |
| 2007 | Chandrahas • | | | |
| 2007 | Okkadunnadu • | | | |
| 2007 | Sangamam • | | | |
| 2008 | Pandurangadu • | | | |
| 2008 | Krishnarjuna • | | | |
| 2008 | Gunde Jhallumandi • | | | |
| 2009 | Magadheera • | | | |
| 2009 | | | | Veera Madakari |
| 2009 | | | Lahore • | |
| 2009 | Vengamamba • | | | |

=== 2010s ===
| Year | Telugu | Tamil | Hindi | Kannada |
|---|---|---|---|---|
| 2010 | Rama Rama Krishna Krishna • | | | |
| 2010 | Young India • | | | |
| 2010 | Vedam • | | | |
| 2010 | Jhummandi Naadam • | | | |
| 2010 | Maryada Ramanna | | | Maryade Ramanna |
| 2010 | Anaganaga O Dheerudu | | | |
| 2011 | Badrinath | | | |
| 2011 | Rajanna | | | |
| 2012 | Dammu | | | |
| 2012 | Eega | | | |
| 2012 | Shirdi Sai | | | |
| 2013 | | | Special 26 • | |
| 2013 | Emo Gurram Egaravachu • | | | |
| 2013 | Intinta Annamayya • | | | |
| 2014 | Anamika • | Nee Enge En Anbe | | |
| 2014 | Dikkulu Choodaku Ramayya • | | | |
| 2015 | Baahubali: The Beginning • | Baahubali: The Beginning | | |
| 2015 | Size Zero • | Inji Iduppazhagi | | |
| 2015 | | | Baby • | |
| 2016 | Lacchimdeviki O Lekkundi • | | | |
| 2017 | Om Namo Venkatesaya • | | | |
| 2017 | Baahubali: The Conclusion • | | | |
| 2018 | God, Sex and Truth • | | | |
| 2018 | Juvva • | | | |
| 2018 | Savyasachi • | | | |
| 2018 | | | Missing • | |
| 2019 | N.T.R: Kathanayakudu • | | | |
| 2019 | N.T.R: Mahanayakudu • | | | |

=== 2020s ===
| Year | Telugu | Hindi | Other languages |
|---|---|---|---|
| 2020 | | 12 'O' Clock | |
| 2021 | Konda Polam | | |
| 2021 | Pelli SandaD | | |
| 2022 | RRR | | |
| 2022 | Jayamma Panchayathi | | |
| 2022 | Modern Love Hyderabad (1 song) | | |
| 2022 | | Operation Romeo | |
| 2022 | Bimbisara | | |
| 2023 | | | Magician (Malayalam) |
| 2023 | | | Chandramukhi 2 (Tamil) |
| 2024 | Naa Saami Ranga | | |
| 2024 | | | Premalu (Malayalam) (1 song only, remixed from Devaraagam) |
| 2024 | Love Me | | |
| 2024 | | Auron Mein Kahan Dum Tha | |
| 2025 | Hari Hara Veera Mallu | | |
| 2025 | | Tanvi the Great | |
| 2025 | Baahubali: The Epic | | |
| 2027 | Varanasi † | | |

== Singer ==
List of Telugu songs recorded by Keeravani
| Year | Song | Film | Composer | Co-Singer |
| 1993 | "Ralipoye Puvva" | Matru Devo Bhava | M. M. Keeravani | |
| 1993 | "Venuvai Vachanu" | Matru Devo Bhava | M. M. Keeravani | K. S. Chithra |
| 1999 | "Changure Changure" | Seetharama Raju | M. M. Keeravani | S. P. Balasubrahmanyam, Radhika Sharada |
| 1999 | "Ekaseka Tatta" | Seetharama Raju | M. M. Keeravani | S. P. Balasubrahmanyam, Sujatha Mohan |
| 1999 | "Ecstacy Privacy" | Seetharama Raju | M. M. Keeravani | K. S. Chithra |
| 1999 | "Kundanapu Bommaki" | Seetharama Raju | M. M. Keeravani | S. P. Balasubrahmanyam, S. P. Sailaja |
| 1999 | "Uyalala Uyalala" | Seetharama Raju | M. M. Keeravani | |
| 2001 | "Evaro Evaro" | Naatho Vastava (D) | Karthik Raja | |
| 2002 | "Manase"(Version l) | Lahiri Lahiri Lahirilo | M. M. Keeravani | Ganga |
| 2002 | "Veetavenkata" | Lahiri Lahiri Lahirilo | M. M. Keeravani | |
| 2002 | "Govinda Govinda" | Tappu Chesi Pappu Koodu | M. M. Keeravani | Sujatha Mohan |
| 2003 | "Chitapata Chinukulu" | Aithe | Kalyani Malik | |
| 2003 | "Evarimaata Vinadu" | Seetayya | M. M. Keeravani | |
| 2003 | "Ravayya Ravayya" | Seetayya | M. M. Keeravani | S. P. Balasubrahmanyam |
| 2003 | "Okka Magadu" | Seetayya | M. M. Keeravani | Anuradha Sriram |
| 2003 | "Siggesthundi" | Seetayya | M. M. Keeravani | Shreya Ghoshal |
| 2004 | "Duvvina Talane" | Naa Autograph | M. M. Keeravani | Sumangali |
| 2006 | "Sri Raghavam" | Sri Ramadasu | M. M. Keeravani | |
| 2006 | "Sri Rama Rama Ramethi" | Sri Ramadasu | M. M. Keeravani | |
| 2006 | "Hylesa" | Sri Ramadasu | M. M. Keeravani | Devi Sri Prasad, Malavika |
| 2006 | "Paluke Bangaramayena" | Sri Ramadasu | M. M. Keeravani | K. S. Chithra |
| 2008 | "Poothavesina" | Sangamam | M. M. Keeravani | Pranavi |
| 2008 | "Paalaraathi Shilpaaniki" | Sangamam | M. M. Keeravani | Pranavi |
| 2009 | "Dheera Dheera Dheera" | Magadheera | M. M. Keeravani | Nikitha Nigam |
| 2015 | "Nippule Swasaga" | Baahubali: The Beginning | M. M. Keeravani | |
| 2015 | "Sivuni Ana" | Baahubali: The Beginning | Mounima | |
| 2017 | "Sahore Bahubali" | Baahubali 2: The Conclusion | Daler Mehndi, Mounima | |
| 2018 | "Bulliguvva" | 2.0 | A. R. Rahman | |
| 2021 | "Tala Etthu" | Konda Polam | M. M. Keeravani | Harika Narayan, Sri Soumya Varanasi |
| 2021 | "Daarulu Daarulu" | Konda Polam | M. M. Keeravani | Harika Narayan |
| 2022 | "Janani" | RRR | M. M. Keeravani | |
| 2022 | "Etthara Jenda" | RRR | M. M. Keeravani | Vishal Mishra, Prudhvi Chandra, Sahithi, Harika Narayan |
List of Hindi songs recorded by Keeravani
| Year | Song | Film | Composer | Co-Singer |
| 1996 | "Pehli Nazar Mein" | Pehli Nazar Mein (non-film album) | M. M. Keeravani | Anuradha Paudwal |
| 1996 | "Aao Na Tarsao Na" | Pehli Nazar Mein (non-film album) | M. M. Keeravani | Anuradha Paudwal |
| 1996 | "Yeh Pyar Hai Dushman Dil Ka" | Pehli Nazar Mein (non-film album) | M. M. Keeravani | Anuradha Paudwal |
| 1996 | "Bol Mere Darpan Mein Kaisi" | Pehli Nazar Mein (non-film album) | M. M. Keeravani | Anuradha Paudwal |
| 1996 | "Chanchal Naina Tumhare" | Pehli Nazar Mein (non-film album) | M. M. Keeravani | Anuradha Paudwal |
| 1996 | "Dil Dhadakta Hai To" | Pehli Nazar Mein (non-film album) | M. M. Keeravani | Anuradha Paudwal |
| 1996 | "Yaad Aa Gai Jaise" | Pehli Nazar Mein (non-film album) | M. M. Keeravani | Anuradha Paudwal |
| 1996 | "Tu Meri Gori Main Tera" | Pehli Nazar Mein (non-film album) | M. M. Keeravani | Anuradha Paudwal |
| 1996 | "Chup Tum Raho" | Is Raat Ki Subah Nahin | M. M. Keeravani | K. S. Chithra |
| 1996 | "Jeevan Kya Hai" | Is Raat Ki Subah Nahin | M. M. Keeravani | solo |
| 1997 | "Guzare Zamane" | Guzare Zamane (non-film album) | M. M. Keeravani | solo |
| 1997 | "Nazar Milate Ghabrate" | Guzare Zamane (non-film album) | M. M. Keeravani | Kavita Paudwal |
| 1997 | "Jaao Jagao Na Sajna" | Guzare Zamane (non-film album) | M. M. Keeravani | Anuradha Paudwal |
| 1999 | "I Hate This Bloody Sentence" | Coffee Aur Kreem (non-film album) | M. M. Keeravani | Solo |
| 2005 | "Khubsurat hai Woh Itna" | Rog | M. M. Keeravani | Udit Narayan |
| 2015 | "Panchi Bole" | Baahubali: The Beginning | M. M. Keeravani | Palak Muchhal |
| 2022 | "Janani" | RRR | | |
List of Tamil songs recorded by Keeravani
| Year | Song | Film | Composer | Co-Singer |
| 1992 | "Kambankaade" | Vaaname Ellai | M. M. Keeravani | Chithra |
| 1996 | "Vaadaa Vayasu Paiyaa" | Purushan Pondatti | Sirpy | |
| 1998 | "Unnoduthan Kanavile" (sad) | Kondattam | M. M. Keeravani | Chithra |
| 2003 | "Kanavugal" | Naam | Kalyani Malik | |
| 2015 | "Siva Sivaya Potri" | Baahubali: The Beginning | M. M. Keeravani | Vaikom Vijayalakshmi |
| 2017 | "Bale Bale Bale" | Baahubali 2: The Conclusion | M. M. Keeravani | Daler Mehndi, Mounima |
| 2022 | "Uyire" | RRR | M. M. Keeravani | |
| 2024 | "Enna Kattipoda" | Ambi | AB Muralidharan | Saindhavi |
List of Kannada songs recorded by Keeravani
| Year | Song | Film | Composer | Co-Singer |
| 2001 | "Belaguva Suriyani" | Sundara Kanda | M. M. Keeravani | |
| 2018 | "Manase Manase" | Prema Baraha | Jassie Gift | |
| 2022 | "Janani" | RRR | M. M. Keeravani | |
List of Malayalam songs recorded by Keeravani
| Year | Song | Film | Composer | Co-Singer |
| 2015 | "Arivan Arivan" | Baahubali: The Beginning | M. M. Keeravani | Vaikom Vijayalakshmi |
| 2017 | "Oru Jeevan Bahuthyagam" | Baahubali 2: The Conclusion | M. M. Keeravani | |
| 2022 | "Janani" | RRR | M. M. Keeravani | |

Television

- "Ye Daaramo" for Ammamma.com (2007–2008)

Notes:

- The films are listed in order that the music released, regardless of the dates the film released.
- The year next to the title of the affected films indicates the release year of the either dubbed or remade version in the named language later than the original version.
- • indicates original language release. Indicates simultaneous makes, if featuring in more languages.
- ♦ indicates a remade version, the remaining ones being dubbed versions.

== Lyricist ==
This is a listing of the songs and tracks Keeravani has contributed as a lyricist to various feature films.

| Year | Film | Song(s) |
|---|---|---|
| 1991 | Attintlo Adde Mogudu | "Andagada Andhukora" |
| 1992 | Allari Mogudu | "Neelimabbu Nuragalo" |
| 1992 | Gharana Mogudu | "Kappuko Duppati" |
| 1993 | Rakshana | "Kannepapa Anduko" |
| 1993 | Major Chandrakanth | "Muddultho Onamalu" |
| 1994 | Allari Premikudu | "Naari Jana Priyatama" |
| 1997 | Priyaragalu | "Rayabaram Pampindevare" |
| 2003 | Gangotri | "Kannitini Pannitiga Chesi" |
| 2006 | Vikramarkudu | "Jum Jum Maya", "Dooranga", "Jo Laali" |
| 2009 | Magadheera | "Naakosam Nuvvu", "Rolling Titles Music" |
| 2010 | Vedam | "Rupai", "Malli Puttani", "Vedam", "Ee Chikati Cherani", "Alalai Kammani Kalali", "Nuvumundhani Nemundhani" |
| 2012 | Shirdi Sai | "Manava Seva Madhava Sevani", "Sadhaa Nimbi" |
| 2017 | Baahubali 2: The Conclusion | "Oka praanam", "Kannaa nidurinchara", "Dandaalayyaa" |
| 2019 | NTR: Kathanayakudu | "Venditera Dora", "Ramanna Katha", "Rajarshi" |
| 2019 | Mathu Vadalara | "Saalaa Rey Saalaa" |
| 2021 | Konda Polam | "Obulamma" |
| 2022 | RRR | "Janani" |
| 2025 | Shashtipoorthi | "Yedo Yejanmalodo" |
