= List of accolades received by RRR =

RRR accolades
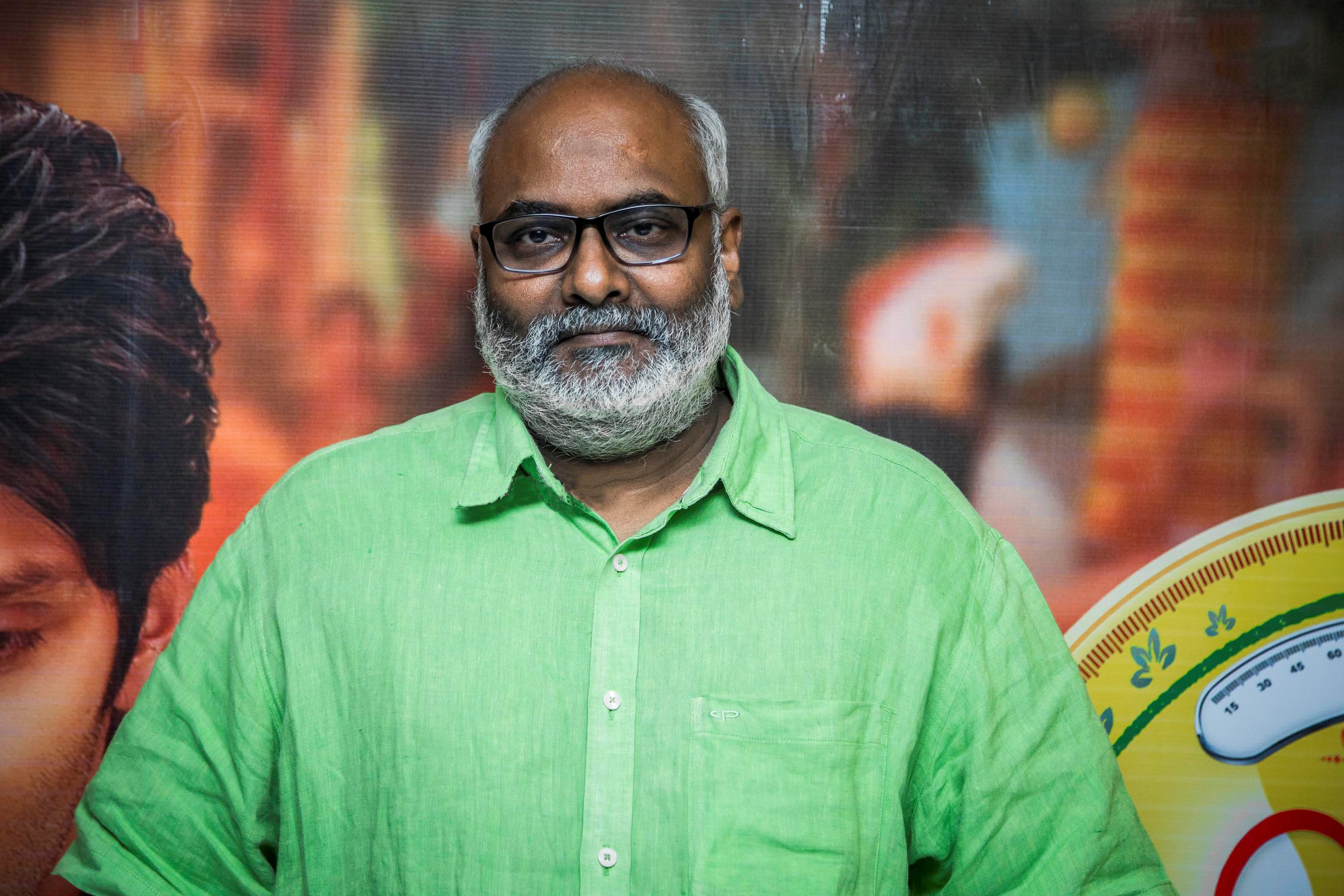
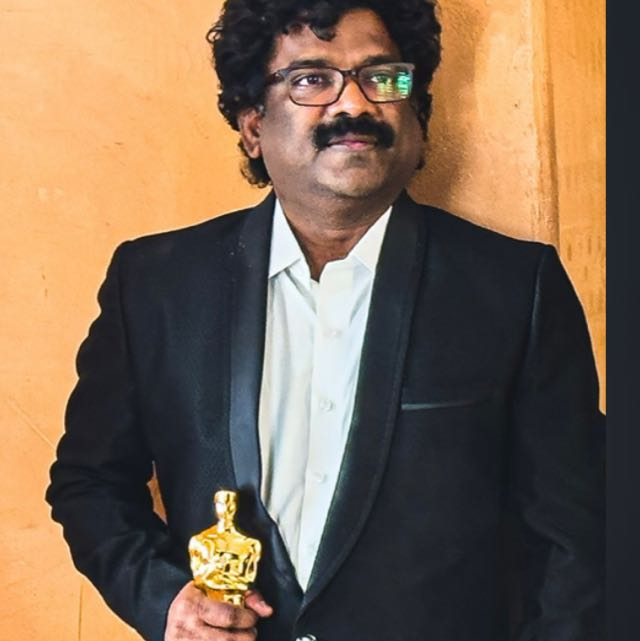
- M. M. Keeravani and Chandrabose got widespread acclaim and received various accolades
Awards and nominations
Award	Wins	Nominations
Academy Awards	1	1
Alliance of Women Film Journalists	1	1
Asian Film Awards	0	2
Atlanta Film Critics Circle	1	2
Austin Film Critics Association	1	5
Boston Society of Film Critics	1	1
Chicago Film Critics Association Awards	0	4
CNN-News18 Indian of the Year	0	1
Critics' Choice Movie Awards	2	5
Critics' Choice Super Awards	0	3
Dorian Awards	1	1
Filmfare Awards South	9	13
Florida Film Critics Circle Awards	0	2
Georgia Film Critics Association	2	3
Golden Globe Awards	1	2
Golden Trailer Awards	1	1
Hollywood Critics Association Awards	3	5
Hollywood Critics Association Creative Arts Awards	2	4
Hollywood Critics Association Midseason Awards	1	1
Hollywood Music in Media Awards	0	2
Houston Film Critics Society Awards	3	5
Japan Academy Film Prize	0	1
Las Vegas Film Critics Society	0	3
London Film Critics' Circle	0	2
Los Angeles Film Critics Association Awards	2	2
National Board of Review Awards	1	1
National Film Awards	6	6
New York Film Critics Circle Awards	1	1
New York Film Critics Online Awards	1	1
Online Film Critics Society	2	5
San Diego Film Critics Society	0	1
Santosham Film Awards	2	2
Satellite Awards	0	5
Saturn Awards	1	3
Seattle Film Critics Society	1	3
Southeastern Film Critics Association	2	2
South Indian International Movie Awards	5	11
St. Louis Film Critics Association Awards	0	4
Utah Film Critics Association	2	2
Vancouver Film Critics Circle	0	1
Washington D.C. Area Film Critics Association	0	1
Zee Cine Awards	1	1

Totals (Note: Certain award groups do not simply award one winner. They acknowledge several different recipients, have runners-up, and have third place. Since this is a specific recognition and is different from losing an award, runner-up mentions are considered wins in this award tally. For simplification and to avoid errors, each award in this list has been presumed to have had a prior nomination.)
- Wins: 57
- Nominations: 102

RRR (Note: The title's expanded form is Roudraṁ Raṇaṁ Rudhiraṁ (transl. "Rage, War, Blood") in Telugu and Rise Roar Revolt in English, but it is commonly referred to as RRR.) is a 2022 Indian Telugu-language epic action drama film directed by S. S. Rajamouli, who co-wrote the film with V. Vijayendra Prasad. The film stars N. T. Rama Rao Jr. and Ram Charan as fictionalised versions of Indian revolutionaries Komaram Bheem and Alluri Sitarama Raju respectively. Set in pre-independent India, the plot depicts Raju and Bheem's fight against the British colonialism. Ajay Devgn, Alia Bhatt, Shriya Saran, Samuthirakani, Ray Stevenson, Alison Doody, and Olivia Morris play supporting roles.

Made on a budget of ₹550 crore ($66 million), RRR was the most expensive Indian film at the time. The film was released theatrically on 25 March 2022. RRR emerged as the highest-grossing film in its home market of Andhra Pradesh and Telangana, grossing over ₹405.9 crore (US$42 million) and surpassing Rajamouli's previous film Baahubali 2. The film grossed ₹1,125.9 crore ($311–362 million) worldwide, setting several box office records for an Indian film, including the third highest-grossing Indian film and second highest-grossing Telugu film worldwide.

The film has received various awards and nominations. The film was considered to be one of the best films of the year by the National Board of Review, making it only the second non-English film ever to make it to the list. With its win for Best Original Song at the 80th Golden Globe Awards, "Naatu Naatu" became the first Asian as well as the first Indian song to win the award.

== Accolades ==
Award (Note: Awards, festivals and organizations are in alphabetical order.)	Date of ceremony (Note: Date is linked to the article about the awards held that year, wherever possible.)	Category	Recipient(s)	Result	Ref.
Academy Awards	12 March 2023	Best Original Song	M. M. Keeravani and Chandrabose ("Naatu Naatu")	Won	
Alliance of Women Film Journalists	5 January 2023	Best Non-English Language Film	RRR	Won	
Asian Film Awards	12 March 2023	Best Visual Effects	V. Srinivas Mohan	Nominated	
Asian Film Awards	12 March 2023	Best Sound	Ashwin Rajashekar	Nominated	
Atlanta Film Critics Circle	5 December 2022	Best International Feature	RRR	Won	
Atlanta Film Critics Circle	5 December 2022	Top 10 Films	RRR	5th place	
Austin Film Critics Association	10 January 2023	Best Director	S. S. Rajamouli	Nominated	
Austin Film Critics Association	10 January 2023	Best International Film	RRR	Nominated	
Austin Film Critics Association	10 January 2023	Best Film Editing	A. Sreekar Prasad	Nominated	
Austin Film Critics Association	10 January 2023	Best Score	M. M. Keeravani	Nominated	
Austin Film Critics Association	10 January 2023	Best Stunt Coordinator	Nick Powell	Won	
Boston Society of Film Critics	11 December 2022	Best Original Score	M. M. Keeravani	Won	
Celebrity Film Awards	24 February 2023	Best Foreign Language Film	RRR	Won	
Chicago Film Critics Association	14 December 2022	Best Director	S. S. Rajamouli	Nominated	
Chicago Film Critics Association	14 December 2022	Best Original Score	M. M. Keeravani	Nominated	
Chicago Film Critics Association	14 December 2022	Best Foreign Language Film	RRR	Nominated	
Chicago Film Critics Association	14 December 2022	Best Use of Visual Effects	RRR	Nominated	
CNN-News18 Indian of the Year	12 October 2022	Entertainment	Team RRR	Nominated	
Critics' Choice Movie Awards	15 January 2023	Best Picture	RRR	Nominated	
Critics' Choice Movie Awards	15 January 2023	Best Director	S. S. Rajamouli	Nominated	
Critics' Choice Movie Awards	15 January 2023	Best Song	"Naatu Naatu"	Won	
Critics' Choice Movie Awards	15 January 2023	Best Visual Effects	RRR	Nominated	
Critics' Choice Movie Awards	15 January 2023	Best Foreign Language Film	RRR	Won	
Critics' Choice Super Awards	16th March 2023	Best Action Movie	RRR	Nominated	
Critics' Choice Super Awards	16th March 2023	Best Actor in an Action Movie	Ram Charan	Nominated	
Critics' Choice Super Awards	16th March 2023	Best Actor in an Action Movie	N. T. Rama Rao Jr.	Nominated	
Dublin Film Critics Circle	15 December 2022	Best Film	RRR	7th place	
Dublin Film Critics Circle	15 December 2022	Best Director	S. S. Rajamouli	7th place	
Dublin Film Critics Circle	15 December 2022	Best Cinematography	K. K. Senthil Kumar	6th place	
Dorian Awards	23 February 2023	Non-English Language Film of the Year	RRR	Won	
Filmfare Awards South	2024	Best Film – Telugu	RRR	Won	
Filmfare Awards South	2024	Best Director – Telugu	S. S. Rajamouli	Won	
Filmfare Awards South	2024	Best Actor – Telugu	N. T. Rama Rao Jr.	Won	
Filmfare Awards South	2024	Best Actor – Telugu	Ram Charan	Won	
Filmfare Awards South	2024	Best Supporting Actor – Telugu	Ajay Devgun	Nominated	
Filmfare Awards South	2024	Best Music Director – Telugu	M. M. Keeravani	Won	
Filmfare Awards South	2024	Best Lyricist – Telugu	Chandrabose ("Naatu Naatu")	Nominated	
Filmfare Awards South	2024	Best Lyricist – Telugu	Suddala Ashok Teja ("Komuram Bheemudo")	Nominated	
Filmfare Awards South	2024	Best Male Playback Singer – Telugu	Kaala Bhairava ("Komuram Bheemudo")	Won	
Filmfare Awards South	2024	Best Male Playback Singer – Telugu	Rahul Sipligunj and Kaala Bhairava ("Naatu Naatu")	Nominated	
Filmfare Awards South	2024	Best Female Playback Singer – Telugu	Prakruthi Reddy ("Komma Uyyala")	Nominated	
Filmfare Awards South	2024	Best Cinematographer	K. K. Senthil Kumar	Won	
Filmfare Awards South	2024	Best Choreography	Prem Rakshith ("Naatu Naatu")	Won	
Filmfare Awards South	2024	Best Production Design	Sabu Cyril	Won	
Florida Film Critics Circle	22 December 2022	Best Foreign Language Film	RRR	Nominated	
Florida Film Critics Circle	22 December 2022	Best Art Direction / Best Production Design	RRR	Nominated	
Georgia Film Critics Association	13 January 2023	Best Picture	RRR	Nominated	
Georgia Film Critics Association	13 January 2023	Best International Film	RRR	Won	
Georgia Film Critics Association	13 January 2023	Best Original Song	M. M. Keeravani, Kaala Bhairava, Rahul Sipligunj ("Naatu Naatu")	Runner-up	
Golden Globe Awards	10 January 2023	Best Original Song	M. M. Keeravani and Chandrabose ("Naatu Naatu")	Won	
Golden Globe Awards	10 January 2023	Best Non-English Language Film	RRR	Nominated	
Golden Trailer Awards	29 June 2023	Best Foreign Trailer	"RRRe-Release" (Sequence Creative)	Won	
Hollywood Critics Association Awards	24 February 2023	Best Picture	RRR	Nominated	
Hollywood Critics Association Awards	24 February 2023	Best Director	S. S. Rajamouli	Nominated	
Hollywood Critics Association Awards	24 February 2023	Best Action Film	RRR	Won	
Hollywood Critics Association Awards	24 February 2023	Best International Film	RRR	Won	
Hollywood Critics Association Awards	24 February 2023	Best Original Song	"Naatu Naatu" – Rahul Sipligunj and Kaala Bhairava	Won	
Hollywood Critics Association Awards	24 February 2023	Best Stunts	RRR	Won	
Hollywood Critics Association Awards	24 February 2023	Spotlight Award	Cast of RRR	Won	
Hollywood Critics Association Creative Arts Awards	24 February 2023	Best Editing	A. Sreekar Prasad	Nominated	
Hollywood Critics Association Creative Arts Awards	24 February 2023	Best Visual Effects	V. Srinivas Mohan	Nominated	
Hollywood Critics Association Midseason Film Awards	1 July 2022	Best Picture	DVV Entertainment	Runner-up	
Hollywood Music in Media Awards	16 November 2022	Best Original Score in an Independent Film (Foreign Language)	M. M. Keeravani	Nominated	
Hollywood Music in Media Awards	16 November 2022	Song – Onscreen Performance (Film)	Rahul Sipligunj and Kaala Bhairava ("Naatu Naatu")	Nominated	
Houston Film Critics Society	18 February 2023	Best Picture	RRR	Nominated	
Houston Film Critics Society	18 February 2023	Best Foreign Language Feature	RRR	Won	
Houston Film Critics Society	18 February 2023	Best Original Song	"Naatu Naatu"	Won	
Houston Film Critics Society	18 February 2023	Best Visual Effects	RRR	Nominated	
Houston Film Critics Society	18 February 2023	Best Stunt Coordination Team	RRR	Won	
Japan Academy Film Prize	10 March 2023	Outstanding Foreign Language Film	RRR	Nominated	
Las Vegas Film Critics Society	12 December 2022	Best Foreign Language Film	RRR	Nominated	
Las Vegas Film Critics Society	12 December 2022	Best Original Song	"Naatu Naatu"	Nominated	
Las Vegas Film Critics Society	12 December 2022	Best Cinematography	K. K. Senthil Kumar	Nominated	
London Film Critics' Circle	5 February 2023	Foreign Language Film of the Year	RRR	Nominated	
London Film Critics' Circle	5 February 2023	Technical Achievement Award	Nick Powell	Nominated	
Los Angeles Film Critics Association	11 December 2022	Best Director	S. S. Rajamouli	Runner-up	
Los Angeles Film Critics Association	11 December 2022	Best Music	M. M. Keeravani	Won	
MTV Movies & TV Awards	7 May 2023	Best Musical Moment	"Naatu Naatu"	Nominated	
National Board of Review	8 December 2022	Top Ten Films	RRR	Won (Note: This award does not have a single winner, but recognizes multiple films.)	
National Film Awards	17 October 2023	Best Popular Film Providing Wholesome Entertainment	D. V. V. Danayya (Producer), S. S. Rajamouli (Director)	Won	
National Film Awards	17 October 2023	Best Male Playback Singer	Kaala Bhairava ("Komuram Bheemudo")	Won	
National Film Awards	17 October 2023	Best Music Direction – Score	M. M. Keeravani	Won	
National Film Awards	17 October 2023	Best Special Effects	V. Srinivas Mohan	Won	
National Film Awards	17 October 2023	Best Choreography	Prem Rakshith ("Naatu Naatu")	Won	
National Film Awards	17 October 2023	Best Stunt Choreographer	King Soloman	Won	
New York Film Critics Circle	4 December 2022	Best Director	S. S. Rajamouli	Won	
New York Film Critics Online	11 December 2022	Top Films of the Year	RRR	Won	
Online Film Critics Society	23 January 2023	Best Picture	RRR	6th place	
Online Film Critics Society	23 January 2023	Best Film Not in the English Language	RRR	Nominated	
Online Film Critics Society	23 January 2023	Best Visual Effects	RRR	Nominated	
Online Film Critics Society	23 January 2023	Best Stunt Coordination	RRR	Won	
Online Film Critics Society	23 January 2023	Best Original Song	"Naatu Naatu"	Won	
San Diego Film Critics Society	6 January 2023	Best International Film	RRR	Nominated	
Santosham Film Awards	26 December 2022	Best Dialogue	Burra Sai Madhav	Won	
Santosham Film Awards	26 December 2022	Best Lyricist	Suddala Ashok Teja ("Komuram Bheemudo")	Won	
Satellite Awards	3 March 2023	Best Motion Picture – Comedy or Musical	RRR	Nominated	
Satellite Awards	3 March 2023	Best Art Direction and Production Design	Sabu Cyril	Nominated	
Satellite Awards	3 March 2023	Best Original Song	"Naatu Naatu"	Nominated	
Satellite Awards	3 March 2023	Best Sound (Editing and Mixing)	Boloy Kumar Doloi, Rahul Karpe, and Raghunath Kemisetty	Nominated	
Satellite Awards	3 March 2023	Best Visual Effects	V. Srinivas Mohan	Nominated	
Saturn Awards	25 October 2022	Best International Film	DVV Entertainment	Won	
Saturn Awards	25 October 2022	Best Action or Adventure Film	DVV Entertainment	Nominated	
Saturn Awards	25 October 2022	Best Director	S. S. Rajamouli	Nominated	
Seattle Film Critics Society	17 January 2023	Best Film Not in the English Language	RRR	Nominated	
Seattle Film Critics Society	17 January 2023	Best Action Choreography	RRR	Won	
Seattle Film Critics Society	17 January 2023	Best Visual Effects	Srinivas Mohan, Pete Draper, Daniel French	Nominated	
Southeastern Film Critics Association	12 December 2022	Best Foreign-Language Film	RRR	Won	
Southeastern Film Critics Association	12 December 2022	Top Ten Films	RRR	Won	
South Indian International Movie Awards	15 September 2022	Best Film – Telugu	DVV Entertainment	Nominated	
South Indian International Movie Awards	15 September 2022	Best Director – Telugu	S. S. Rajamouli	Won	
South Indian International Movie Awards	15 September 2022	Best Cinematographer – Telugu	K. K. Senthil Kumar	Won	
South Indian International Movie Awards	15 September 2022	Best Actor – Telugu	N. T. Rama Rao Jr.	Won	
South Indian International Movie Awards	15 September 2022	Best Actor – Telugu	Ram Charan	Nominated	
South Indian International Movie Awards	15 September 2022	Best Music Director – Telugu	M. M. Keeravani ("Naatu Naatu")	Won	
South Indian International Movie Awards	15 September 2022	Best Lyricist – Telugu	Chandrabose ("Naatu Naatu")	Won	
South Indian International Movie Awards	15 September 2022	Best Lyricist – Telugu	Suddala Ashok Teja ("Komuram Bheemudo")	Nominated	
South Indian International Movie Awards	15 September 2022	Best Male Playback Singer – Telugu	Rahul Sipligunj and Kaala Bhairava ("Naatu Naatu")	Nominated	
South Indian International Movie Awards	15 September 2022	Best Male Playback Singer – Telugu	Kaala Bhairava ("Komuram Bheemudo")	Nominated	
South Indian International Movie Awards	15 September 2022	Best Female Playback Singer – Telugu	Prakruthi Reddy ("Komma Uyyala")	Nominated	
St. Louis Gateway Film Critics Association	18 December 2022	Best Action Film	RRR	Nominated	
St. Louis Gateway Film Critics Association	18 December 2022	Best International Film	RRR	Nominated	
St. Louis Gateway Film Critics Association	18 December 2022	Best Visual Effects	V. Srinivas Mohan	Nominated	
St. Louis Gateway Film Critics Association	18 December 2022	Best Scene	"Piggyback prison escape"	Nominated	
Telangana Gaddar Film Awards	30 May 2025	Best Feature Film	RRR	Won	
Utah Film Critics Association	17 December 2022	Best Director	S. S. Rajamouli	Runner-up	
Utah Film Critics Association	17 December 2022	Best Non-English Language Feature	RRR	Won	
Vancouver Film Critics Circle	13 February 2023	Best Foreign Language Film	RRR	Nominated	
Washington D.C. Area Film Critics Association	12 December 2022	Best International/Foreign Language Film	RRR	Nominated	
Zee Cine Awards	26 February 2023	Pride of Indian Cinema	S. S. Rajamouli	Won	
