= Vaaname Ellai =

1992 film by K. Balachander

- Theatrical release poster
- Directed by: K. Balachander
- Written by: K. Balachander
- Produced by: Rajam Balachander; Pushpa Kandaswamy
- Starring: Anand Babu; Babloo Prithviraj; Gowtham Sundararajan; Ramya Krishnan; Madhoo; Bhanupriya; Rajesh
- Cinematography: R. Raghunatha Reddy
- Edited by: Ganesh Kumar
- Music by: Marakathamani
- Production company: Kavithalayaa Productions
- Release date: 22 May 1992
- Country: India
- Language: Tamil

Vaaname Ellai (transl. The sky is the limit) is a 1992 Indian Tamil-language drama film written and directed by K. Balachander, starring Anand Babu, Babloo Prithiveeraj, Gowtham Sundararajan, Madhoo, Ramya Krishnan, Vishali Kannadasan and Rajesh. The story involves five characters from different backgrounds, who, vexed with their lives, enter a suicide pact, but begin a short journey of 100 days to live together happily before dying.

The story of Vaaname Ellai was conceived after Balachander became upset learning of numerous suicides inspired by his own film Ek Duuje Ke Liye (1981), and was convinced he could make a film speaking against suicide. The film was released on 22 May 1992, and Balachander won the Filmfare Award for Best Director – Tamil.

== Plot ==
Five young people decide that life is not worth living any more for various reasons.

Deepak, the son of judge K. Manjunath, is an idealist and never suspects that the many gifts that are showered upon him by his father were things received as bribes. One day, dressed as a robot, he shoots a video song about corruption in society. Seeing this, his friend remarks that his own father is very corrupt. An angered Deepak beats up his friend and challenges him that if that were true, he would commit suicide out of shame. Back at home, he sees his father taking a large amount of money as bribe for a lawsuit. A shocked Deepak argues with his father over his corrupt practices. His mother starts justifying corruption, which has brought the family luxuries like the bungalow, the car, and Deepak's new Yamaha bike. Besides, a large amount of money is needed for the marriage dowry of their two daughters (Deepak's sisters). Deepak is unable to bear this and immediately sets fire to his Yamaha bike. He then leaves home.

Gautham is the only son of rich businessman, M. R. T. He is motherless, happy-go-lucky, and in love with Suguna, a computer operator who works in his father's office. One day, his father learns of their love and despises it as he has big plans to marry his son to the daughter of a rich, potential business partner. He threatens Gautham to not marry Suguna, but the much-pampered Gautham is adamant in marrying her. Meanwhile, Akhila, Suguna's widowed mother, also objects to their love, fearing for problems arising due to the difference in their social status. M. R. T. comes up with a plan to stop the couple from marrying. He convinces Akhila to marry him, thereby making Gautham and Suguna step-siblings. The couple is heartbroken. Gautham wants to commit suicide, but Suguna wants to continue to live as the new stepdaughter of M. R. T. She soon shows her own brand of revenge by heavily partying, boozing, and having one night stands, all under her stepfather's nose. When arrested for creating a public nuisance, she proudly proclaims being M. R. T.'s daughter, so as to humiliate him.

Karpagam flees from home when forced into marriage with a very rich but old man. Subathra is a gang-rape victim. Pasupathy is a poor youth of high caste who does not get employment because of caste based reservation despite scoring very high marks in college.

They all meet at the suicide point and decide to live a happy life for 100 days and then end it all. In those 100 days, they have all sorts of fun. They also sing mourning songs for their own death. However, Pasupathy secretly tries to change his friends' minds away from suicide. But they tell him that their mind is made up and he can leave if he chooses to. Despite this, Pasupathy sets his suicide earlier and informs them that he did so to make them realise that death is no joke and if his friends changed their minds, his death would not be in vain. They soon start getting doubts about going ahead with their suicides.

Meanwhile, they find a baby at their doorstep and have no choice but to take care of the child. They get emotionally close to the child. Finally, Pasupathy's father comes and meets them, having tracked his son's letters with great difficulty. When informed of his son's death, he mourns and accuses the remaining youths for being the cause of his death. The four decide to die immediately upon hearing this. As they go to the suicide point, they meet the 'dead' Pasupathy there. He says that he had faked his own death as well as arranged for the child and his father to dissuade them. His father takes the child to an orphanage, and they meet people with various physical deformities trying to live a fruitful and cheerful life. After gaining inspiration from many of the disabled persons who had achieved things and also from the advice they give them, the five youths decide to live a long and brave life.

== Cast ==
- Anand Babu as Deepak
- Prithveeraj as Gautham
- Charle as Sabu
- Krishnan as Babu
- Madhubala as Karpagam
- Ramya as Subathra
- Chithra as Sundari, Gandhiraman's sister
- Gowtham as Pasupathy
- Dhamu as Chevvaa
- Madhan Bob as Paa. Dhi. Pandiyan
- Vishali Kannadasan as Suguna
- Bhanupriya as herself
- Haneefa as M.R.T., Gautam's father
- Rajesh as Samyvelu, Pasupathy's father
- H. Ramakrishnan as Gandhiraman
- Sethu Vinayagam as K. Manjunath, Deepak's father
- Poovilangu Mohan as Deepak's friend
- Y. Vijaya as Akhila, Suguna's mother
- S. N. Lakshmi as Sabu and Babu's mother

== Production ==
After the release of Ek Duuje Ke Liye (1981), Balachander was upset on learning of numerous people wanting to commit suicide the way it happened in the film. Lakshmi Vijayakumar, a psychiatrist, suggested he make a film showing "the thought of suicide in a positive light — to go through struggle, but overcome it and realise that life is worth living". This laid the foundation for Vaaname Ellai. The film marked the acting debut of Dhamu as comedians who went on to become popular. Bob had been recommended to Balachander by his father's friend.

== Soundtrack ==
The music was composed by Maragadha Mani, with lyrics by Vairamuthu. He later reused the tune of "Kambangadu" as "Gundu Soodi" for the Telugu film Chatrapathi (2005). The tune of "Jana Gana Mana" was later adapted by Maragadha Mani as "Yedavaku" for the Telugu film S. P. Parasuram.

Tamil (original) version

Song	Singers	Length
"Ada Yaaringe Manidhan"	Rajamani	03:05
"Jana Gana Mana"	S. P. Balasubrahmanyam, K. S. Chithra	05:37
"Kambangadu Kambangadu"	Maragadha Mani, K. S. Chithra	04:36
"Nadodi Mannargale"	K. S. Chithra	05:01
"Nee Aandavana"	S. P. Balasubrahmanyam, K. S. Chithra	05:10
"Siragillai"	K. S. Chithra	04:26
"Sogam Eni Ellai"	S. P. Balasubrahmanyam	04:26
"Thambigala"	Maragadha Mani	01:03

Telugu (dubbed) version The film was dubbed into Telugu as 2 October and all lyrics were written by Rajasri.

Song	Singers	Length
"Shokame Lede Kalataku"	S. P. Balasubrahmanyam	04:27
"Ee Poota Meekanta"	K. S. Chithra	05:11
"Nee Tallevaro Tandrevaro"	S. P. Balasubrahmanyam, K. S. Chithra	04:54
"Nenega Rachilakanta"	K. S. Chithra	02:51
"Janaganamana Ani Pade"	S. P. Balasubrahmanyam, K. S. Chithra	05:25
"Abbailu Meeto"	Krishna Murthy	01:06
"Ammatodu Ammatodu"	Mano, K. S. Chithra, Chorus	04:26
"Oh Manishi"	Mano	02:59

== Release and reception ==
Vaaname Ellai was released on 22 May 1992. On the same day, N. Krishnaswamy of The Indian Express wrote, "Given the varied nature of characters at hand, the treatment at first has got to be episodic but Balachander's vibrant style of telling a tale keeps reels crackling". K. Vijiyan of New Straits Times called it a "must-see picture for youth". Kutty Krishnan of Kalki praised Balachander for delivering a message against suicide. However Ananda Vikatan was critical of the film stating Balachander deviated from the main topic with unnecessary diversions and it lacked the brilliance of Balachander's old films while also stating that the messages in preachy tone makes the film feel like a documentary rather than a film. The film won the Tamil Nadu State Film Award Special Prize for Best Film, and Balachander won the Best Story Writer award at the same ceremony. Balachander also won the Filmfare Award for Best Director – Tamil.
