= Nandi Awards of 1992 =

Indian Telugu film and TV awards ceremony

Nandi Awards presented annually by Government of Andhra Pradesh. First awarded in 1964.

== 1992 Nandi Awards Winners List ==
Category	Winner	Film
Best Feature Film	No film was awarded	
Second Best Feature Film	Kranthi Kumar	Rajeswari Kalyanam
Third Best Feature Film	K. Viswanath	Aapadbandhavudu
