= RRR (soundtrack) =

- Soundtrack album cover

Soundtrack album by M. M. Keeravani
- Released: 16 April 2022
- Recorded: 2019–2021
- Genre: Feature film soundtrack
- Length: 29:36
- Language: Telugu
- Labels: Lahari Music; T-Series
- Producer: M. M. Keeravani

M. M. Keeravani chronology
Pelli SandaD (2021)	RRR (2022)	Operation Romeo (2022)

Singles from RRR
- 1. "Dosti" Released: 1 August 2021; 2. "Naatu Naatu" Released: 10 November 2021; 3. "Janani" Released: 26 November 2021; 4. "Komuram Bheemudo" Released: 24 December 2021; 5. "Raamam Raaghavam" Released: 31 December 2021; 6. "Etthara Jenda" Released: 14 March 2022

RRR is the soundtrack album, composed by M. M. Keeravani, to the 2022 Indian Telugu-language epic action drama film of the same name, directed by S. S. Rajamouli, starring N. T. Rama Rao Jr., Ram Charan, Ajay Devgn, Alia Bhatt, and Olivia Morris while Samuthirakani, Shriya Saran, Ray Stevenson, and Alison Doody play supporting roles.

The film featured seven tracks with lyrics written by Sirivennela Seetharama Sastry, Chandrabose, Suddala Ashok Teja, Ramajogayya Sastry, K. Shiva Dutta and Keeravani himself. Madhan Karky (Tamil), Riya Mukherjee and Varun Grover (Hindi), Mankombu Gopalakrishnan (Malayalam) and Varadaraj Chikkaballapura (Kannada), wrote lyrics for the dubbed versions. The album, was released by Lahari Music and T-Series on 16 April 2022.

RRR became the second non-English language film to be screened at the Royal Albert Hall in London, receiving a standing ovation. The event featured a live performance of the film's score alongside the screening of the epic action film. The first non-English film to be screened at the venue was Baahubali: The Beginning, which was also directed by S.S. Rajamouli with the score composed by M.M. Keeravani.

== Production ==
"RRR throbs with many pulse-pounding moments. Underlying all those spectacular sequences is one consuming emotion that elevates them. Giving musical form to the beat of that very heart was one of the most fulfilling experiences"

— M. M. Keeravani

Rajamouli's cousin and norm collaborator M. M. Keeravani was recruited to score for the film. Music sittings began during March 2019, at the special manduva house constructed nearby, a specially erected set at the Aluminium factory in Hyderabad. Suddala Ashok Teja was hired as few of the primary lyricists in the same period. In September 2019, he wrote the lyrics for two songs of the Telugu version's soundtrack.

On 21 September 2020, he announced through his Twitter account that work on the film's music has been paused for a while due to the COVID-19 pandemic lockdown in India. Music sessions resumed in early 2021. In April 2021, Vishal Mishra joined the session and worked for a single of the album along with Keeravani at a recording studio in Hyderabad. On 20 July 2021, Amit Trivedi announced that he recorded a song in the soundtrack album. On the same day, Keeravani announced that a young singer named Prakruthi recorded a song in the album. The same month, Anirudh Ravichander also recorded one song for the film. In July 2021, T-Series and Lahari Music acquired the audio rights of RRR in five languages, reportedly at an amount of ₹25 crore.

== Marketing and release ==
The first single was released on 1 August 2021, coinciding with Friendship Day. The music video was directed by S. S. Karthikeya and was released as "Dosti" (in Telugu, Hindi and Kannada), "Natpu" (in Tamil), and "Priyam" (in Malayalam) with vocals by Vedala Hemachandra in Telugu, Amit Trivedi in Hindi, Anirudh Ravichander in Tamil, Vijay Yesudas in Malayalam and Yazin Nizar in Kannada. In addition, N. T. Rama Rao Jr. and Ram Charan made cameo appearances in the music video. The promotional music video of the first track "Dosti" was filmed at a specially constructed set at Annapurna Studios. On 10 November 2021, the second single titled "Naatu Naatu" (in Telugu), "Naacho Naacho" (in Hindi), "Naatu Koothu" (in Tamil), "Haali Naatu" (in Kannada) and "Karinthol" (in Malayalam) was released. The song received positive response for the choreography performed by Ram Charan and N. T. Rama Rao Jr., and became the album's most-viewed song in YouTube.

On 26 November, the third single titled as "Janani", in all languages, except for Tamil, whose version was titled "Uyire", was released, featuring vocals by M. M. Keeravani. A special preview of the track was held at PVR RK Cineplex in Hyderabad, with Rajamouli and Keeravani attending the event, the former called the track as the "soul of the film". On 24 December, the fourth song "Komuram Bheemudo" was released highlighting Rama Rao's character in the film, while serving as a tribute to the freedom fighter Komaram Bheem. It was released in the same title in Hindi, "Komuram Bheemudho" in Kannada" and "Komuram Bheemano" in Tamil and Malayalam. The fifth song, "Ramam Raghavam" was released on 31 December 2021, coinciding New Year's Eve. The song revolves around Charan's characterisation as Alluri Sitarama Raju.

On 14 March 2022, the track "Etthara Jenda" (in Telugu), "Sholay" (in Hindi), "Koelae" (in Tamil), "Etthuva Jenda" (in Kannada) and "Etthuka Jenda" (in Malayalam), was released as a single. A promotional track, featuring Charan, Rama Rao and Alia Bhatt, the song was played during the end credits of the film. After the film's release, Keeravani assured fans about the release of the track, "Komma Uyyala" which was positively received. The track was later released as part of the full album on 16 April 2022.

== Track listing ==
Telugu
No.	Title	Lyrics	Singer(s)	Length
1.	"Dosti"	Sirivennela Seetharama Sastry	Vedala Hemachandra	5:42
2.	"Naatu Naatu"	Chandrabose	Rahul Sipligunj, Kaala Bhairava	3:36
3.	"Janani"	M. M. Keeravaani	M. M. Keeravaani	3:07
4.	"Komuram Bheemudo"	Suddala Ashok Teja	Kaala Bhairava	4:15
5.	"Raamam Raaghavam"	K. Shiva Dutta	Vijay Prakash, Chandana Bala Kalyan, Charu Hariharan	3:52
6.	"Etthara Jenda"	Ramajogayya Sastry	Vishal Mishra, Prudhvi Chandra, M.M. Keeravaani, Sahithi, Harika Narayan	4:21
7.	"Komma Uyyala"	Suddhala Ashoka Teja	Prakruthi Reddy	4:43
Total length:				29:36

Tamil
No.	Title	Lyrics	Singer(s)	Length
1.	"Natpu"	Madhan Karky	Anirudh Ravichander	5:40
2.	"Naattu Koothu"	Madhan Karky	Rahul Sipligunj, Yasin Nizar	3:35
3.	"Uyire"	Madhan Karky	M. M. Keeravaani	3:08
4.	"Komuram Beemano"	Madhan Karky	Kaala Bhairava	4:14
5.	"Raamam Raaghavam"	K. Shiva Dutta	Vijay Prakash, Chandana Bala Kalyan, Charu Hariharan	3:52
6.	"Koelae"	Madhan Karky	Vishal Mishra, Benny Dayal, Sahithi Chaganti, Harika Narayan	4:16
7.	"Kombaa Un Kaada"	Madhan Karky	Prakruthi Reddy	4:43
Total length:				29:27

Hindi
No.	Title	Lyrics	Singer(s)	Length
1.	"Dosti"	Riya Mukherjee	Amit Trivedi	5:40
2.	"Naacho Naacho"	Riya Mukherjee	Vishal Mishra, Rahul Sipligunj	3:35
3.	"Janani"	Varun Grover	M. M. Keeravaani	3:08
4.	"Komuram Bheemudo"	Varun Grover	Kaala Bhairava	4:14
5.	"Raamam Raaghavam"	K. Shiva Dutta	Vijay Prakash, Chandana Bala Kalyan, Charu Hariharan	3:52
6.	"Sholay"	Riya Mukherjee	Vishal Mishra, Benny Dayal, Sahithi Chaganti, Harika Narayan	4:16
7.	"Amber Se Toda"	Varun Grover	Raag Patel	4:43
Total length:				29:27

Malayalam
No.	Title	Lyrics	Singer(s)	Length
1.	"Priyam"	Mankombu Gopalakrishnan	Vijay Yesudas	5:40
2.	"Karinthol"	Mankombu Gopalakrishnan	K. S. Harisankar, Yazin Nizar	3:34
3.	"Janani"	Mankombu Gopalakrishnan	M. M. Keeravaani	3:08
4.	"Komuram Bheemano"	Mankombu Gopalakrishnan	Kaala Bhairava	4:14
5.	"Raamam Raaghavam"	K. Shiva Dutta	Vijay Prakash, Chandana Bala Kalyan, Charu Hariharan	3:51
6.	"Etthuka Jenda"	Mankombu Gopalakrishnan	Vijay Yesudas, Hari Shankar, Sahithi Chaganti, Harika Narayan	4:16
7.	"Komba Ninn Kaada"	Mankombu Gopalakrishnan	Nayana Nair	4:44
Total length:				29:35

Kannada
No.	Title	Lyrics	Singer(s)	Length
1.	"Dosti"	Azad Varadaraj	Yazin Nizar	5:43
2.	"Haali Naatu"	Azad Varadaraj	Rahul Sipligunj, Kaala Bhairava	3:37
3.	"Janani"	Azad Varadaraj	M. M. Keeravaani	3:10
4.	"Komuram Bheemudho"	Azad Varadaraj	Kaala Bhairava	4:16
5.	"Raamam Raaghavam"	K. Shiva Dutta	Vijay Prakash, Chandana Bala Kalyan, Charu Hariharan	3:54
6.	"Etthuva Jenda"	Azad Varadaraj	Prudhvi Chandra, Hymath Mohammed, Sahithi Chaganti, Harika Narayan	4:19
7.	"Kombe Uyyale"	Azad Varadaraj	Prakruthi Reddy	4:46
Total length:				29:45

== Non-album singles ==
No.	Title	Lyrics	Singer(s)	Length
1.	"Roar of RRR"	Blaaze, Aditya Iyengar	Blaaze	1:51

== Background score ==
All music was composed and conducted by M.M. Keeravani.

RRR (Original Background Score) - Volume 1
No.	Title	Length
1.	"Spirit of RRR"	0:39
2.	"The Story"	1:04
3.	"The Fire"	0:36
4.	"Arrest That B"	5:40
5.	"The Water"	0:52
6.	"Tiger Chase"	2:14
7.	"Please Forgive Me"	1:02
8.	"New Attire"	0:34

RRR (Original Background Score) - Volume 2
No.	Title	Length
1.	"Reward Announced, Hunt Began"	1:48
2.	"Jenny is a Kind Soul"	1:05
3.	"Lachu Escapes"	2:21
4.	"Train Accident"	3:04
5.	"Affinity with Jenny"	1:10
6.	"Malli's Existence is Evident"	0:53
7.	"An Invite, A Gift"	1:03
8.	"Lachu is Caught"	0:40
9.	"Scott's Palace"	1:12
10.	"Seetha"	2:31

RRR (Original Background Score) - Volume 3
No.	Title	Length
1.	"Promise (Telugu)"	1:30
2.	"Promise (Hindi)"	1:32
3.	"Promise (Tamil)"	1:30
4.	"Promise (Kannada)"	1:30
5.	"Promise (Malayalam)"	1:30

RRR (Original Background Score) - Volume 4
No.	Title	Length
1.	"Snake Bite"	2:27
2.	"SOS"	0:50
3.	"True Identity Revealed"	3:39
4.	"Making Harder Decisions"	1:24

RRR (Original Background Score) - Volume 5
No.	Title	Length
1.	"Bheem - The Tsunami"	4:28
2.	"Unfortunate Fight"	1:18
3.	"Fire and Water"	0:39
4.	"Tears, Blood and Breach (Telugu)"	3:02
5.	"Tears, Blood and Breach (Hindi)"	3:02
6.	"Tears, Blood and Breach (Tamil)"	3:02
7.	"Tears, Blood and Breach (Kannada)"	3:02
8.	"Tears, Blood and Breach (Malayalam)"	3:02

RRR (Original Background Score) - Volume 6
No.	Title	Length
1.	"Load, Aim, Shoot (The Practice)"	1:17
2.	"Misunderstood"	2:06
3.	"Never Giving Up"	2:56
4.	"Smallpox"	1:58
5.	"Prodigious Precision"	1:47
6.	"Guilt"	1:57

RRR (Original Background Score) - Volume 7
No.	Title	Length
1.	"Ram - The Volcano"	2:23
2.	"Closer Than Ever"	1:01
3.	"Together We Rock (Telugu)"	3:35
4.	"Together We Rock (Hindi)"	3:34
5.	"Together We Rock (Tamil)"	3:35
6.	"Together We Rock (Kannada)"	3:35
7.	"Together We Rock (Malayalam)"	3:35
8.	"Load, Aim, Shoot (Climax)"	2:29
9.	"Raamam Bheemam"	5:33

== Album credits ==
=== Original soundtrack ===
Credits adapted from Lahari Music

==== Songwriter(s) ====
- M. M. Keeravani (Composer, Arranger)

==== Performer(s) ====
- Composition, production, musical arrangements, recording, mixing, mastering – M. M. Keeravani
- Lyrics – Sirivennela Seetharama Sastry, Madhan Karky, Riya Mukherjee, Mankombu Gopalakrishnan, Azad Varadaraj, Chandrabose, M. M. Keeravaani, Varun Grover, Varadaraj Chikkaballapura, K. Shiva Dutta
- Singers – Vedala Hemachandra, Anirudh Ravichander, Amit Trivedi, Vijay Yesudas, Yazin Nizar, Kaala Bhairava, Rahul Sipligunj, Vishal Mishra, K. S. Harisankar, M.M. Keeravani, Vijay Prakash, Chandana Bala Kalyan, Charu Hariharan, Benny Dayal, Prudhvi Chandra, Hymath Mohammed, Sahithi, Harika Narayan, Raag Patel, Nayana Nair, Prakruthi Reddy

== See also ==
- List of accolades received by RRR
