= Uppalapati Narayana Rao =

Indian film director

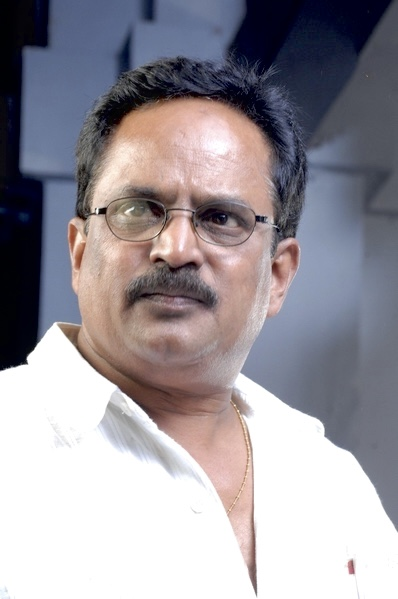
- Born: Uppalapati Narayana Rao; 12 July 1958 (age 67); Kakinada, Andhra Pradesh, India
- Years active: 1979–present
- Spouse: Krishna Veni Uppalapati
- Children: 2

Uppalapati Narayana Rao is an Indian film director, producer, and actor known for his works in Telugu cinema, and Television. He is best known for his works in hits such as Jaitra Yatra (1991), Rakshana (1993), Ala Modalaindhi (2011), and Anthaku Mondhu Aa Tharuvatha (2013).

== Television career ==
He served as content head for channels like ETV, Gemini, MAA and Doordarshan. He is also associated with Balaji Telefilms as the creative head for South Indian content for two years (2010–2012) helping with curation and production of Telugu TV content / programmes.

== Filmography ==
As director

Year	Name	Role
1991	Jaitra Yatra	
1993	Rakshana	
1993	Theerpu	
1994	Allari Police	
1995	Paathabasthi	
1996	Ooriki Monagaadu	
1999	Veedu Saamanyudu Kaadhu	
1995	Simhada Guri	Kannada film
2002	Yuva Rathna	
2007	Gnapakam	

As an actor

Year	Name	Role	Notes
2011	Ala Modalaindi	Nithya's father	
2013	Anthaka Mundu Aa Tarvatha	Rohit's father	
2014	Yennamo Yedho	Kavya's father	Tamil film

Theatre

Name of Play	Role
Phani (Telugu adaptation of Dial M for Murder by Alfred Hitchcock)	Actor
Maro Mohenjodaro	Actor, producer
Hiroshima	Actor, producer
Siddhartha	Actor, producer
Cheema Kuttina Natakam	Actor
Bioscope	Actor
Edhi Asthma Hathya	Actor
Go To Hell	Actor, director

Television

Name	Role	Channel	Notes
Vasantha Kokila	Story and Direction	Doordarshan	Golden Nandi Award for Best Direction and Story
Gruhapravesam	Director	ETV	Golden Nandi for Best Direction
Mahalakshmi	Director	Annapurna Studios	Unreleased
Kottha Bangaram	Creative Head and production	Balaji Telefilms	
Kaliyuga Ramayanam	Creative Head and production	Balaji Telefilms	
Priyanka	Director, Story, Dialogues and Screenplay	ETV	Golden Nandi for Best Direction
Others	Producer	Various Channels	Ongoing Production work to be released
