= H. Ramakrishnan =

Indian newscaster and singer

H. Ramakrishnan (born 25 December 1941) is an Indian newscaster and singer. He has worked in State-run media doordarshan, ((All India Radio)), Press Information Bureau and Directorate of Advertising and Visual Publicity in various capacities.

== Early life ==
H Ramakrishnan contracted polio at the age of two and a half years. Due to his ensuing handicap, he was denied admission to the local school and had to be taken to a different school in a different town by his maternal grandfather. After he passed the UPSC exam when Ramakrishnan went to join duty as either news reader, translator or reporter but he was not accepted for the post because of his handicap.

== Journalism ==
The first person to report live on Tamil News, H Ramakrishnan has been a source of inspiration for many. He has wielded the microphone for many important assignments including the launch of rockets from Sriharikota and caught politicians and VIPs like Former Chief Minister M. Karunanidhi, Chief Minister J Jayalalithaa, the late President Abdul Kalam for quotes.

For Doordarshan he has interviewed Industrialists N. Mahalingan and M. A. M. Ramaswamy, Musicians including Semmangudi Srinivasa Iyer, D. K Pattammal, Actors Gemini Ganesan, Thengai Srinivasan, Prem Nazir, Balachandra Menon, Thikkurisi Sukumaran Nair, Madhu, journalists Dinamalar Krishnamurthy, Tugluk Cho Ramaswamy and Sivandhi Aadhithan of Dina Thanthi.

== News reading ==
While at school he wrote to Melville de Mellow, who asked him to complete college and then apply to read news at AIR. After a few years, he joined AIR and then later DDK and read news for over 25 years in both media.

For three years, he was also Public Relations Manager with Indian Bank and conducted the Platinum jubilee of the bank.

He has acted in a couple of Tamil films including Vaaname Ellai and Jathi Malli, both directed by K Balachander.

== Musician ==
A musician, he has presented concerts at the Music Academy, Tyagaraja Aradhana in Thiruvaiyaru, All India Radio and other Sabhas. A percussionist, he learnt to play the Mridangam from Palani Subramaniam Pillai, and is presently learning from Karaikudi Mani. He plays the Kanjira and is an expert in Konnakkol (spelt Konakol of Konnakol). (Konnakkol is normally an oral accompaniment to Carnatic concerts and a Konnakkol artist, recites a particular kind of rhythmic pattern like that of the Mridangist (drummer)). In recognition of this talent, he has been awarded the Kalaimamani award by the Government of Tamil Nadu for his contributions to the art of Konnakkol. He is the secretary of a music Sabha called Sri Bhairavi Gana Sabha in Chennai. The sabha has been organising concerts of musicians including S. P. Balasubramaniam, O.S. Arun, Aruna Sayeeram and presented awards to Sabha secretaries, musicians and dancers.

== Other works ==
Despite having a disability of 85 percent, Ramakrishnan moved around by buses until he got a side car scooter. Later on he used to drive an autorickshaw with a hand brake, specially fitted for him by Bajaj Auto Ltd. When he was in service a senior official had mentioned the fact that he was physically disabled in Ramakrishnan's confidential report but then Ramakrishnan went to the President V. V. Giri, who immediately passed an order that the fact that people are disabled must not be considered while evaluating them in their Confidential Reports. He also runs Arohana and Sri Bhairavi Gana Sabha, two organisations to propagate Carnatic music.

He runs a charitable trust called Krupa to help specially abled persons to buy hearing aids, walking sticks, tricycles and calipers.

Ramakrishnan has a law degree and belongs to a family of judges (he is great grandson of H Ramakrishna Iyer, Judge at the Travancore High Court, his father R. Harihara Iyer retired as a District and Sessions Judge), but does not practice as an advocate. He has written a couple of books on the Hindu religion. He has also contributed to the columns of The Hindu, Indian Express, Dinamani, Kalki, Tuglaq, and ChennaiOnline.com.

== Personal life ==
He is married to Vasanthaa and has four children.
