= Rakshana =

- Theatrical release poster
- Directed by: Uppalapati Narayana Rao
- Written by: Posani Krishna Murali (dialogues)
- Screenplay by: Akkineni Venkat; Uppalapati Narayana Rao
- Story by: Akkineni Venkat; Uppalapati Narayana Rao
- Produced by: Akkineni Venkat
- Starring: Nagarjuna; Shobhana; Roja; Salim Ghouse
- Cinematography: Teja
- Edited by: Shankar
- Music by: M. M. Keeravani
- Production company: Annapurna Studios
- Release date: 18 February 1993
- Running time: 150 minutes
- Country: India
- Language: Telugu

Rakshana (transl. Indemnity) is a 1993 Telugu-language action film written and directed by Uppalapati Narayana Rao. It was produced by Venkat Akkineni under Annapurna Studios. It stars Nagarjuna and Shobhana, with music composed M. M. Keeravani. Upon release, the film received widely positive reviews and remained a box office hit. Regarded as one of the top cop movies in Telugu, it was subsequently dubbed in Tamil and released as Kaaval Thurai. The film was remade in Bengali Bangladesh as Banglar Hero (1998).

== Plot ==
Assistant commissioner of police Bose (Nagarjuna) gets transferred from Visakhapatnam and takes charge of Hyderabad in his relentless fight to apprehend crime lord brothers Chinna (Salim Ghouse), and Nalla Seenu (Kota Srinivasa Rao) who is also a prominent politician. Chinna kills Bose's friend through his political influence, when the latter and Bose apprehend Chinna for interrogation. Meanwhile, Padma falls in love with Bose and eventually gets married and have a daughter. Eventually, Chinna kidnaps Bose's daughter. How Bose saves his daughter and banishes the mafia ring forms the rest of the story.

== Cast ==
- Nagarjuna as A.C.P. Bose
- Shobhana as Padma
- Salim Ghouse as Chinna
- Kota Srinivasa Rao as Nalla Sreenu
- Nassar as Bose's friend
- Brahmanandam
- M. Balaiah
- Banerjee
- Nirmalamma
- Chinni Jayanth
- Chinna
- Kadambari Kiran
- Ananth
- Teja in a cameo
- J. D. Chakravarthy in a cameo
- M. M. Keeravani in a cameo
- Prabhu Deva in a cameo
- Roja special appearance in the song "Ghallumandhi"
- Silk Smitha special appearance in the song "Neeku Naaku"
- Raghava Lawrence in a cameo
- Brahmaji in Uncredited Role

== Soundtrack ==
Rakshana

Film score by M. M. Keeravani
- Released: 1993
- Genre: Soundtrack
- Length: 25:13
- Label: Akash Audio
- Producer: M. M. Keeravani

M. M. Keeravani chronology
Rajeswari Kalyanam (1993)	Rakshana (1993)	Allari Priyudu (1993)

The film songs were composed by M. M. Keeravani. Music released on AKASH Audio Company.

No.	Title	Lyrics	Singer(s)	Length
1.	"Guppu Guppu"	Sirivennela Sitarama Sastry	S. P. Balasubrahmanyam, Chitra	4:30
2.	"Kannepapa Anduko"	M. M. Keeravani	S. P. Balasubrahmanyam, Chitra	5:21
3.	"Ghallumandhi"	Sirivennela Sitarama Sastry	S. P. Balasubrahmanyam, Chitra	4:54
4.	"Ye Janmadho"	Veturi	M. M. Keeravani, Chitra	6:10
5.	"Neeku Naaku"	Sirivennela Sitarama Sastry	Malgudi Subha	4:18
Total length:				25:13

== Awards ==
- Nandi Award for Best Choreographer - Prabhu Deva
