= Jaathi Malli =

1993 film by K. Balachander

- Theatrical release poster
- Directed by: K. Balachander
- Written by: K. Balachander; Ananthu
- Produced by: Rajam Balachander; Pushpa Kandaswamy
- Starring: Mukesh; Khushbu; Nassar; Vineeth; Yuvarani
- Cinematography: R. Raghunatha Reddy
- Edited by: Ganesh Kumar
- Music by: Maragadha Mani
- Production company: Kavithalayaa Productions
- Release date: 14 January 1993
- Country: India
- Language: Tamil

Jaathi Malli (transl. Royal jasmine) is a 1993 Indian Tamil-language film directed by K. Balachander starring Mukesh, Khushbu, Nassar, Vineeth and Yuvarani. The film was released on 14 January 1993, and won the Tamil Nadu State Film Award for Best Film.

== Plot ==
Sriranjini, a ghazal singer, visits a hill station to recover from the trauma of her mother's murder who was very close to her. She meets Kesavan, who is a taxi driver. He shares his own pain regarding his father murdering his mother and siblings in a drunken rage. Horrified by this story, Sriranjini starts thinking less of her own loss. Circumstances lead to Sriranjini living in the same house as a paying guest. Their relationship remains aloof, despite their mutual admiration.

They run into lovers Vineeth and Yuvarani who call themselves Moscow and Berlin. They are from different religions, Hinduism and Islam. It is not revealed as to who is Muslim and who is Hindu. They inform that they eloped as they wanted to defy their parents concept of marriage. The pesky lovers try to bring Sriranjini and Kesavan together. They also move into the house of Kesavan but are closer to Sriranjini who comes out of her depression regarding her mother's death.

Sriranjini later finds that Kesavan's story regarding his families fate is entirely fabricated and he hails from an affluent family. He confesses that he lied to make her understand that some people have bigger tragedies than what she saw in her life. He could not live with his family as they were having too many properties and inheritance fights and so, he decided to forfeit his inheritance entirely and lead a simple life as a taxi driver.

Later a rich North Indian man pays a lot of attention to Sriranjini and shows that he constantly listens to her music. Kesavan gets jealous of their constant chit chat in Hindi and regarding Ghazals and Sriranjini leaves the house after a fight. She finds that her patron almost keeps her in house arrest and expects her to be his mistress. Sriranjini wants to go back to Kesavan. The younger couple, Moscow and Berlin, try to help the older couple to get together.

When caught by the rioters, Moscow and Berlin ask the rioters to find their religion from their blood. The city is in strict curfew and they are injured in gunfire. They bring the older couple together before dying in each other's arms.

== Cast ==
- Mukesh as Kesavan
- Khushbu as Sriranjini
- Vineeth as Moscow
- Yuvarani as Berlin
- Madhan Bob as Sathyam
- Vichithra as Savitri, Sathyam's wife
- Dhamu as Dhamu
- Nassar as Director Pazhani Bhaskaran
- Rajesh Kumar as Reddy
- H. Ramakrishnan as Dr. Sahasranamam
- Delhi Ganesh as Vaidyanathan, Sahasranamam's brother
- Kavithalaya Krishnan as compounder at Sahasranamam's clinic
- Charle as Udhagai Murugan
- K. S. Jayalakshmi as Aanandham, Sahasranamam's wife
- Yuvashree as Rani, nurse at Sahasranamam's clinic

== Production ==
Balachander approached T. Rajendar to portray a guest role in the film which he rejected. Khushbu's character was named Sriranjani, after the Carnatic raga of the same name. Part of the film's title serves as a double entendre; the full title refers to the jasmine flower, while jaathi also means caste.

== Soundtrack ==
The soundtrack was composed by Maragadha Mani. All lyrics were written by Vairamuthu.

Track listing
No.	Title	Singers	Length
1.	"Azhaithal Varuvaal"	S. P. Balasubrahmanyam, K. S. Chithra	03:30
2.	"Hey Kuppa"	Maragadha Mani	03:00
3.	"Kamban Engu"	S. P. Balasubrahmanyam, K. S. Chithra	05:04
4.	"Manmatha Leelai"	S. P. Balasubrahmanyam, K. S. Chithra	04:22
5.	"Marakamudiyavillai"	S. P. Balasubrahmanyam, K. S. Chithra	04:16
6.	"Solladi Barathamatha I"	S. P. Balasubrahmanyam	04:05
7.	"Solladi Barathamatha II"	Maragatha Mani, K. S. Chithra	02:13
8.	"Samundharu"	K. S. Chithra	03:32
Total length:			30:02

== Release and reception ==
Jaathi Malli was released on 14 January 1993. Malini Mannath of The Indian Express called it "a total let down. The script just meanders with various subplots that gets linked whenever the director happens to remember each of them". C. R. K. of Kalki praised Balachander for making a film against caste riots but panned the cliched climax. Though the film was not a commercial success, it won the Tamil Nadu State Film Award for Best Film.
