= Nandi Awards of 1995 =

Indian Telugu film and TV awards ceremony

Nandi Awards presented annually by Government of Andhra Pradesh. First awarded in 1964.

== 1995 Nandi Awards Winners List ==
| Category | Winner | Film |
|---|---|---|
| Best Feature Film | Gunasekhar | Sogasu Chuda Taramaa? |
| Second Best Feature Film | C. V. Reddy | Badili |
| Third Best Feature Film | Muthyala Subbaiah | Ammayi Kapuram |
