= Nandi Awards of 1993 =

Indian Telugu film and TV awards ceremony

Nandi Awards presented annually by Government of Andhra Pradesh. First awarded in 1964.

== 1993 Nandi Awards Winners List ==
Category	Winner	Film
Best Feature Film	Bapu	Mister Pellam
Second Best Feature Film	Siva Nageswara Rao	Money (film)
Third Best Feature Film	K.Ajay kumar	Matru Devo Bhava
