= Rajeswari Kalyanam =

- Cassette cover
- Directed by: Kranthi Kumar
- Written by: L. B. Sriram (dialogues)
- Screenplay by: Kranthi Kumar
- Story by: Kranthi Kumar
- Produced by: Vijayalakshmi; Padmaja Vani; Murali Mohan (presents)
- Starring: Akkineni Nageswara Rao; Meena; Vanisri; Suresh
- Cinematography: K. S. Hari
- Edited by: A. Sreekar Prasad
- Music by: M. M. Keeravani
- Production company: Sri Jayabheri Art Productions
- Release date: 14 January 1993
- Running time: 131 Mins
- Country: India
- Language: Telugu

Rajeswari Kalyanam (transl. Marriage of Rajeswari) is a 1993 Indian Telugu-language drama film directed by Kranthi Kumar. The film was produced by D. Kishore under the Sri Jayabheri Art Productions banner and presented by Murali Mohan. It stars Akkineni Nageswara Rao, Meena, Vanisri, Suresh and music composed by M. M. Keeravani. The film won seven Nandi Awards.The film core plot line is taken from Hollywood movie, On Golden Pond.

== Cast ==
- Akkineni Nageswara Rao as Master
- Meena as Rajeswari
- Vanisri as Seeta
- Suresh as Shankar
- Gummadi as Venkat Rayudu
- Jayachitra as Bhavani
- Srikanth as Bhavani's brother
- Brahmanandam as Kankara Kanaka Rao
- Babu Mohan as Pedda Pentaiah
- Pakhija as Gaydala Rajamma
- Baby Shrestha as Kishtaiah

== Soundtrack ==
Rajeswari Kalyanam

Film score by M. M. Keeravani
- Released: 1993
- Genre: Soundtrack
- Length: 28:04
- Label: AKASH Audio
- Producer: M. M. Keeravani

M. M. Keeravani chronology
Jaathi Malli (1993)	Rajeswari Kalyanam (1993)	Rakshana (1993)

Music composed by M. M. Keeravani. Lyrics were written by Veturi. Music released on AKASH Audio Company.

No.	Title	Singer(s)	Length
1.	"Endaro Mahanubhavulu"	S. P. Balasubrahmanyam, Chitra, Baby Prasanna	3:51
2.	"Ningi Neela"	S. P. Balasubrahmanyam, Chitra	4:47
3.	"Chukka Chukka"	S. P. Balasubrahmanyam, Chitra	5:22
4.	"Danisariga Danisariga"	S. P. Balasubrahmanyam, Chitra, Baby Prasanna	1:15
5.	"Odanu Jaripe"	S. P. Balasubrahmanyam, Chitra	3:51
6.	"Sri Ganapathi"	S. P. Balasubrahmanyam	4:46
Total length:			28:04

== Reception ==
Griddaluru Gopalrao of Zamin Ryot praised several performances of the cast, the fact that the film was produced by two women and the fact that the Telugu villages in the film were full of local milieu.

== Awards ==
Nandi Awards

- Best Feature Film - Silver - D. Kishore (1992)
- Best Actress - Meena
- Best Supporting Actress - Jayachitra
- Best Lyricist - Veturi
- Best Female Playback Singer - K. S. Chitra
- Best Music Director - M. M. Keeravani
- Best Costume Designer - Sai
