= Eega (soundtrack) =

2012 film score by M. M. Keeravani

- Soundtrack album cover

Soundtrack album by M. M. Keeravani
- Released: 4 April 2012
- Recorded: 2012
- Genre: Feature film soundtrack
- Length: 20:15
- Language: Telugu
- Labels: Vel Records; Sony Music India
- Producer: M. M. Keeravani

M. M. Keeravani chronology
Dammu (2012)	Eega (2012)	Shirdi Sai (2012)

Eega is the soundtrack album to the 2012 Indian fantasy film of the same name. Its Tamil version is titled Naan Ee. Composed by M. M. Keeravani, the film's soundtrack in both Telugu and Tamil versions features five songs, out of which one is a remixed version of the title song. The soundtrack, released in Telugu and Tamil on 4 April and 2 May 2012, was a critical and commercial success.

== Development ==
The soundtracks of Eega and Naan Ee, composed by M. M. Keeravani, feature five songs each. One of the five is a remixed version of the film's title song. Madhan Karky penned the lyrics for all the songs in Naan Ee. Ramajogayya Sastry, Anantha Sreeram, Chaitanya Prasad and Keeravani penned the lyrics for one song each in Eega. A song "Sapnon Ki Ek" was included in the soundtrack of Makkhi. It was performed by Kaala Bhairava and its lyrics were penned by Anuj Gurwara, who provided vocals for the song "Lava Lava" in Eega. Gurwara provided vocals for the song "Thoda Hans Ke" in Makkhi, whose lyrics were penned by himself.

As the film's theme (revenge) and the protagonist (housefly) were universal concepts, Keeravani ensured that the tunes do not have "distinct ethnic or regional flavour" and "appealed across the broad", which was his "only challenge". He "tried to play" with the buzzing sound generated by flies in the background score and used it according to the emotional nature of the scene exaggerating it at times and toning it down. Rajamouli approached Karky after the release of Enthiran (2010) and explained the importance of each song in the film's narrative. Apart from giving the detailed profiles of the characters, Rajamouli also enacted few sequences which helped Karky in writing the lyrics. For the song "Veesum Velichathiley" ("Nene Nanine" in Telugu) performed by Karthik in Tamil and Deepu in Telugu, Karky mentioned the use of pencils and magnifying glasses in the lyrics, as the female lead is a miniature artist. According to Rajamouli, they "really brought out the lovelorn nature of the character". Karky described "Konjam Konjam" ("Konchem Konchem" in Telugu) as a "personal song featuring the hero" which inspires the female lead to design a sculpture. While "Lava Lava" is a song from the antagonist's point of view, "Eeda Eeda" ("Eega Eega" in Telugu) describes the fly's desire to seek revenge.

== Track listing ==
=== Telugu ===
Eega
No.	Title	Lyrics	Singer(s)	Length
1.	"Nene Nani Ne"	M. M. Keeravani	Deepu, Sahithi	4:13
2.	"Eega Eega Eega"	Ramajogayya Sastry	Deepu, Rahul Sipligunj, Sravana Bhargavi, Chaitra	4:47
3.	"Konchem Konchem"	Anantha Sreeram	Vijay Prakash	4:06
4.	"Lava Lava"	Chaitanya Prasad	Anuj Gurwara, Shivani	3:54
5.	"Eega Eega Eega (Remix)"	Ramajogayya Sastry	Deepu, Rahul Sipligunj, Sravana Bhargavi, Chaitra	4:20
Total length:				21:49

=== Tamil ===
All lyrics are written by Madhan Karky.

Naan Ee
No.	Title	Singer(s)	Length
1.	"Veesum Velichathile"	Karthik, Sahithi	3:08
2.	"Eedaa Eedaa"	Ranjith	4:47
3.	"Konjam Konjam"	Vijay Prakash	4:07
4.	"Lava Lava"	Achu, Shivani	3:54
5.	"Eedaa Eedaa (Remix)"	Ranjith, Deepu, Rahul Sipligunj, Sravana Bhargavi, Chaitra	4:19
Total length:			20:15

=== Malayalam ===
All tracks are written by Mankombu Gopalakrishnan.

Eecha
No.	Title	Singer(s)	Length
1.	"Veeshum Velichathile"	Vidhu Prathap, Sahithi	3:09
2.	"Eecha Eecha"	Ranjith	4:54
3.	"Konjam Nenjam"	Sudeep Kumar	4:07
4.	"Lava Lava"	Achu, Shivani	3:55
5.	"Eecha Eecha (Remix)"	Ranjith, Deepu, Rahul Sipligunj, Sravana Bhargavi, Chaitra	4:25
Total length:			20:30

=== Hindi ===
All tracks are written by Neelesh Misra, except "Thoda Hans Ke" and "Sapnon Ki Duniya", written by Anuj Gurwara.

Makkhi
No.	Title	Singer(s)	Length
1.	"Are Are Are"	K.K, Sahithi	4:12
2.	"Naam Apun Ka Jani"	Deepu, Rahul Sipligunj	4:47
3.	"Thoda Hans Ke"	Anuj Gurwara	4:07
4.	"Lava Lava"	Anuj Gurwara	3:53
5.	"Sapnon Ki Ek Duniya Hai"	Kaala Bhairava	2:49
6.	"Naam Apun Ka Jani (Remix)"	Deepu, Rahul Sipligunj, G. Jeevan Babu	4:20
Total length:			24:08

== Release ==
The soundtrack of Eega was released on 4 April 2012 by hosting a promotional event, at Brahma Kumaris' Shanti Sarovar academy, Gachibowli. The soundtrack of Naan Ee was released on 2 May 2012 by hosting another promotional event at Sathyam Cinema, Chennai. After four days of Eega's soundtrack release, the producers released it on iTunes in an attempt to avoid piracy and illegal downloads. The album art of the soundtrack, marketed by Vel Records and Sony Music India, features a still of the fly using headphones and a microphone.

== Reception ==
The soundtrack was critically acclaimed and achieved commercial success. Writing for The Hindu, Sangeetha Devi Dundoo found the film's soundtrack to be "melodious", adding that it is "sharply contrasted by the background score, which seamlessly moves from sober to playful to pulsating". Another critic from The Hindu, S. R. Ashok Kumar said, "Vijay Prakash has rendered ‘Konjam Konjam' well". Kumar appreciated the violin portions in the song "Eedaa Eedaa" in addition to describing "Lava Lava" as "a good number". Karthik Pasupulate of The Times of India stated that Keeravani "just seems to reserve his best for [Rajamouli]" and called the soundtrack "one of his finest". Y. Maheswara Reddy, writing for Daily News and Analysis, termed "Konchem Konchem" as the best song in the soundtrack. Kaushik L. M. of Behindwoods called the album "A nice compilation of numbers by Maragathamani" and said, "If the film delivers what is expected, then some of the songs will catch on in a big way, particularly the title song." Vishnupriya Bhandaram, also from The Hindu, listed "Konchem Konchem" among the popular and acclaimed melodious songs in Indian music for the year 2012.
