= Naatu Naatu =

2021 music from the Indian film RRR

Single by M. M. Keeravani and Chandrabose featuring Rahul Sipligunj and Kaala Bhairava

from the album RRR
- Language: Telugu
- Released: 10 November 2021
- Recorded: 2020
- Studio: JB Studios, Hyderabad
- Genre: Dance; pop; Dappankuthu; Western classical
- Length: 3:36
- Label: Lahari Music; T-Series
- Composer: M. M. Keeravani
- Lyricist: Chandrabose
- Producer: M. M. Keeravani

Music video
- "Naatu Naatu" on YouTube

"Naatu Naatu" (Telugu: నాటు నాటు, romanized: Nāṭu Nāṭu, lit. 'Rustic, Rustic') is a 2021 Indian Telugu-language song composed by M. M. Keeravani, with lyrics by Chandrabose and recorded by Rahul Sipligunj and Kaala Bhairava for the soundtrack album of the 2022 Indian film RRR.

It was released on 10 November 2021 (released on YouTube as a lyrical video song) as the second single from the album, through Lahari Music and T-Series. The full video song, featuring visuals directly from the film, was released on 11 April 2022 on YouTube. The song was also released in Hindi as "Naacho Naacho", in Tamil as "Naattu Koothu", in Kannada as "Halli Naatu" and in Malayalam as "Karinthol". The hook step dance involving N. T. Rama Rao Jr. and Ram Charan – the lead actors of RRR – became popular.

"Naatu Naatu" became the first Indian and first Asian song to win the Academy Award for Best Original Song, and also the first Indian song to win the Golden Globe Award for Best Original Song. (Note: Oscars and Golden Globe Award winner references) It also won the Critics Choice Award for Best Original Song.

== Background and recording ==
The entire process of producing the song took over 19 months. Keeravani composed 10 to 20 different tunes based on that particular point in the script. Later, the team finalized this particular tune based on a voting process from their inner circle.

== Composition and lyrics ==
Sing about yourself, your strength, your struggle, whatever you want to sing. The one thing not to write is: don't criticize other people.

— Rajamouli's brief to Chandrabose.

The Telugu word naatu (నాటు nāṭu) variously translates to 'native', 'local', 'countryside', 'raw and rustic', 'ethnic'. Chandrabose wrote the lyrics based on his childhood memories. According to Chandrabose, he wrote 90% of the song in half a day but it took 1.7 years to write the remaining 10%.

The composer Keeravani likened the sound to the traditional beats of folk songs in Indian villages. Keeravani used duffs, an Indian skin drum for the instrumentation and added in mandolins for the melody. The song features a 6/8 beat popular in South Indian music.

The song was also released in Hindi as "Naacho Naacho", in Tamil as "Naattu Koothu", in Kannada as "Halli Naatu" and in Malayalam as "Karinthol". It was released on 10 November 2021 (released on YouTube as a lyrical video song) as the second single from the album, through Lahari Music and T-Series. The full video song, featuring visuals directly from the film, was released on 11 April 2022 on YouTube.

== Critical reception ==
Onmanorama praised the song and stated, "The mood-lifting beats and the perkiest actors dancing to those beats is just what the fans have been waiting for, ever since the makers announced the magnum opus." A. Kameshwari of The Indian Express wrote "Naatu Naatu offer double the fun as the two actors perform together on screen and create an insane energy, which makes you want to dance too. The RRR song can sure be titled as the best mass track of the year." A review from Mirchi9 criticized the song itself for being ordinary, calling it as "an old-school, serviceable number". However, they praised Rama Rao and Charan's choreography and rapport, calling it as a "visual feast". Matt Patches of Polygon and Wes Greene of Slant Magazine named the musical sequence as one of the best movie scenes of 2022.

Alison Herman of The Ringer complimented the idea of the song and wrote "Naatu Naatu is something different: a musical performance that moves the story forward in a movie that isn't primarily musical, challenging the binary of "musical" versus "not" and making the song itself more integral to the film", comparing it with the Academy Award for Best Original Song nominees. Analyzing the song, Sudhir Srinivasan of The New Indian Express stated: "The 274 seconds of the song inspire a rare loss of inhibition; they urge you to let go, give in, trust, and just dance. Worry later, dance now. For those seconds, everyone—the oppressive white man, the meek princess, the Indian rebels—is equal in dance and joy". Firstpost's Ganesh Aaglave praised Rahul Sipligunj and Kaala Bhairava's vocals.

== Accolades ==
Awards and nominations received by "Naatu Naatu"
| Awards | Date of ceremony | Category | Result | Ref. |
|---|---|---|---|---|
| Academy Awards | 12 March 2023 | Best Original Song | Won | |
| Critics' Choice Awards | 15 January 2023 | Best Song | Won | |
| Georgia Film Critics Association | 13 January 2023 | Best Original Song | Runner-up | |
| Golden Globe Awards | 10 January 2023 | Best Original Song | Won | |
| Hollywood Critics Association | 24 February 2023 | Best Original Song | Won | |
| Hollywood Music in Media Awards | 16 November 2022 | Song – Onscreen Performance | Nominated | |
| Houston Film Critics Society | 18 February 2023 | Best Original Song | Won | |
| Online Film Critics Society | 23 January 2023 | Original Song | Won | |
| Satellite Awards | 3 March 2023 | Best Original Song | Nominated | |

== Music video ==
=== Background and production ===
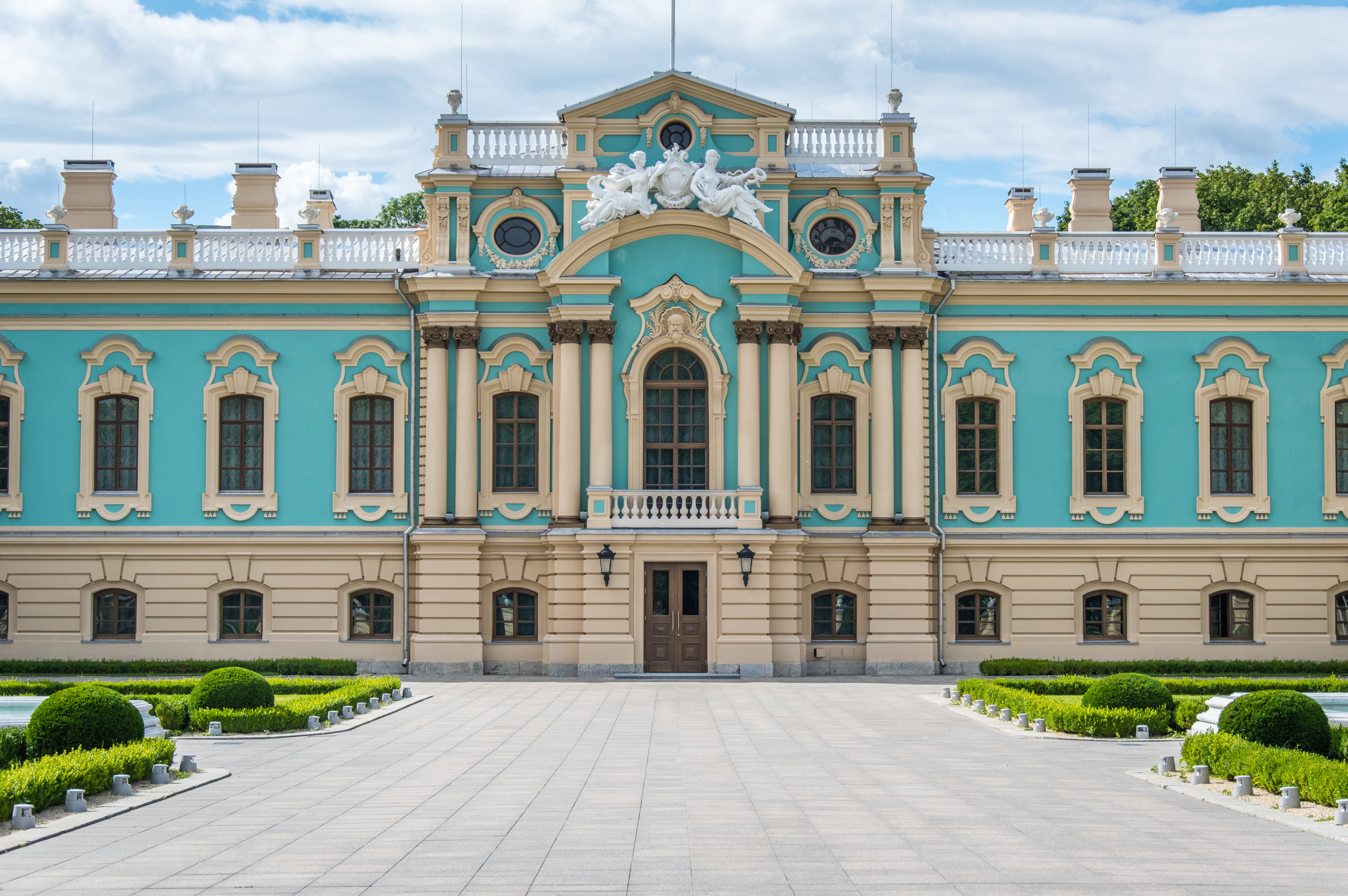
"Naatu Naatu" was shot at the Mariinskyi Palace, Ukraine.

RRR director Rajamouli conceived "Naatu Naatu" as a kind of fight sequence in which the Indian duo outdance their British counterparts. He also used the song as a foreshadowing for the climax sequence. "I think the biggest achievement for me was incorporating how the song comes into the film, without breaking the narrative," he noted. Rajamouli described the sequence as "the story behind the story" and is like a short film of its own with different sub-plots.

Prem Rakshith choreographed the dance sequences. Rajamouli wanted steps "that would look great with two people doing it together, but not so complicated that no-one could do it." Rakshith choreographed 110 moves for the hook step.

"Naatu Naatu" was shot in August 2021 in Ukraine as a part of the final leg of shooting of RRR. Filming took place at the Mariinskyi Palace, the official residence of the president of Ukraine in Kyiv, a few months before the onset of the Russian invasion of Ukraine. The song picturization took 15 days. The music video featured about 50 dancers and 300 to 400 extras.

=== Synopsis ===
The music video is a direct clip from a scene in RRR, which features Raju and Bheem singing the lyrics and out-dancing the rich British men at a fancy British party, encouraged by Bheem's love interest Jenny. By the song's climax, Raju and Bheem ignite a dance battle between themselves and the British men, who each fall down one by one as they fail to keep up; and despite being cheered for, Raju pretends to injure his leg and falls over to allow Bheem to win the battle and impress Jenny.

=== Reception ===
Within 24 hours of its release, the song crossed over 17 million views in Telugu, and 35 million views in all five languages on YouTube. It also became the fastest Telugu song to cross 1 million likes. In February 2022, the song crossed over 200 million views in all languages.

== Impact ==
The song received positive reception from audiences, praising the music. The hook step performed by Jr NTR and Ram Charan, went viral on social media. Charan and Rama Rao often recreated the viral portion of the dance in the film's promotions, as did director Rajamouli at the film's success party with encouragement from Rama Rao.

In an article, Brenda Haas of Deutsche Welle referred to the song as a "global sensation". She further opined and wrote that, "the song's international popularity also underscores the fact that language is no barrier to enjoying music across borders". At Edison, New Jersey in 2023, numerous Tesla cars were assembled to have a show of light & sound, set to the music of this song.

== Credits and personnel ==
Credits adapted from YouTube.

- M. M. Keeravani – composer
- Chandrabose – lyricist
- Rahul Sipligunj – vocal
- Kaala Bhairava – vocal,arranger
- Prem Rakshith – Choreographer
- G. Jeevan Babu – mix engineer, mastering engineer, programmer
- Siddharth S – programmer

== Charts ==
Chart performances for "Naatu Naatu"
| Chart (2023) | Peak position |
|---|---|
| India (Billboard) Naacho Naacho | 3 |
| India (Billboard) Halli Naatu | 4 |
| India (Billboard) Naattu Koothu | 5 |
| Japan Hot Overseas (Billboard Japan) | 16 |
| US World Digital Song Sales (Billboard) | 3 |

== Other versions ==
In September 2024, Ajay Bhutoria released a 1.5 minute video version of "Naacho Naacho" in support of the Kamala Harris 2024 presidential campaign that was produced by Ritesh Parikh and sung by Shibani Kashyap.

== See also ==
- List of Indian winners and nominees of the Golden Globe Awards
