= M. M. Keeravani =

Indian composer and singer (born 1961)

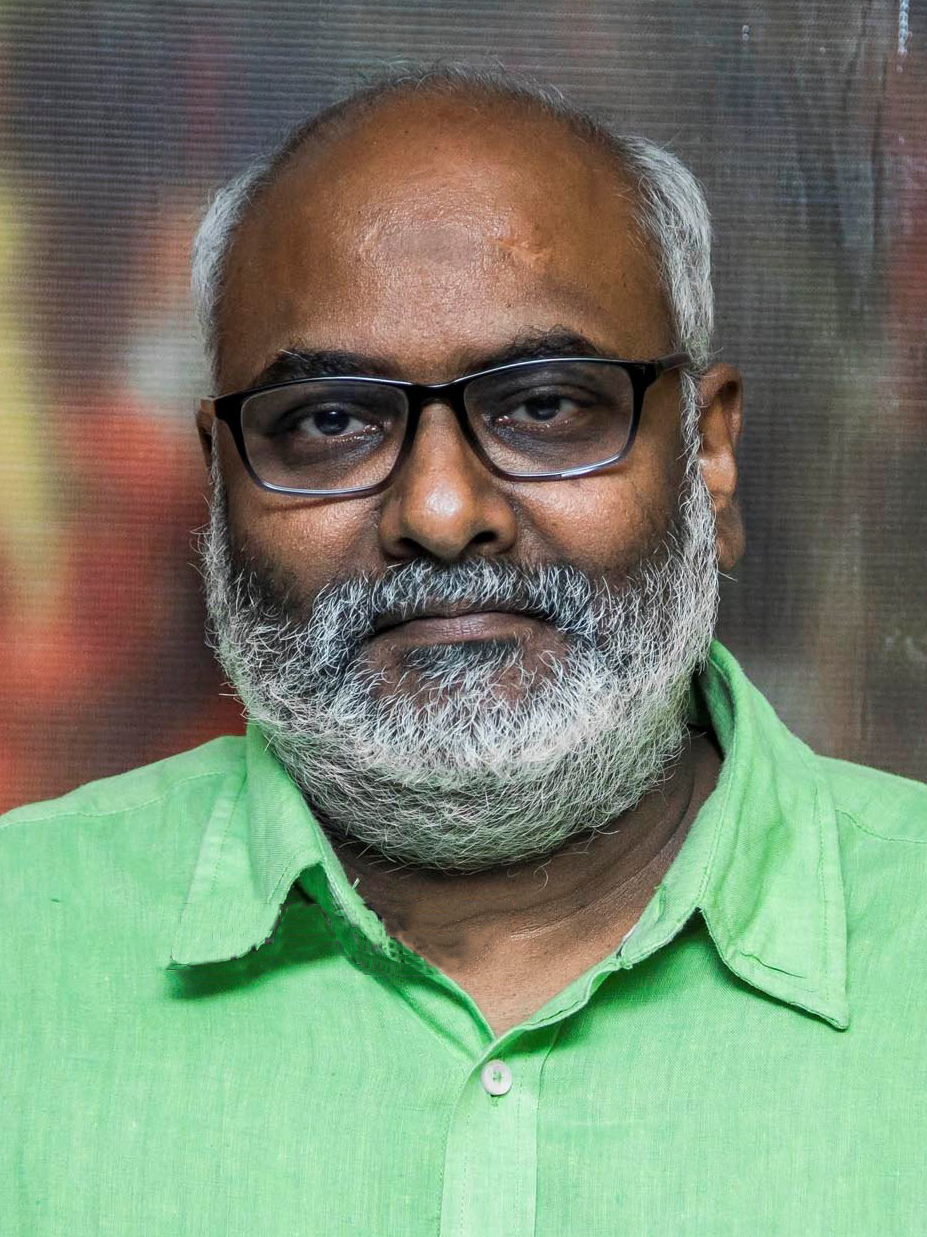
- Keeravani in 2015

Background information
- Also known as: Maragathamani; M. M. Kreem
- Born: Koduri Marakathamani Keeravaani; 4 July 1961 (age 65); Kovvur, Andhra Pradesh, India
- Genres: Film score; World music; Telugu music
- Occupations: Film composer; Record producer; Singer; Lyricist
- Works: Discography
- Years active: 1990–present
- Spouse: Koduri Srivalli

Koduri Marakathamani Keeravani (born 4 July 1961), professionally known as M. M. Keeravani, is an Indian music composer, singer and lyricist, primarily associated with Telugu cinema. In a career spanning over three decades, Keeravani has earned several national and international accolades, including an Academy Award, a Golden Globe Award, a Critics' Choice Movie Award, two National Film Awards, eleven Nandi Awards, eight Filmfare Awards, and a LAFCA Award. In 2023, the Government of India honoured him with the Padma Shri for his contributions towards Indian cinema.

In addition to his work in Telugu cinema, Keeravani has composed music for a few Hindi, Tamil, Kannada and Malayalam films. He is best known for his compositions in works such as Kshana Kshanam (1991), Gharana Mogudu (1992), Allari Priyudu (1993), Criminal (1994), Subha Sankalpam (1995), Pelli Sandadi (1996), Devaraagam (1996), Annamayya (1997), Zakhm (1998), Student No.1 (2001), Jism (2003), Paheli (2005), Sri Ramadasu (2006), Magadheera (2009), Eega (2012), Baahubali (2015 and 2017), and RRR (2022). He is also known for his frequent collaborations with filmmakers K. Raghavendra Rao, Mahesh Bhatt, and S. S. Rajamouli, and the singers S. P. Balasubrahmanyam, K. S. Chithra.

== Early and personal life ==
Keeravani was born into a Telugu family to lyricist and screenwriter Koduri Siva Shakthi Datta, in the town of Kovvur in West Godavari district, Andhra Pradesh. He is the cousin of filmmaker S. S. Rajamouli and music composer M. M. Srilekha. His younger brothers are music composer Kalyani Malik and writer S. S. Kanchi. He is the nephew of screenwriter V. Vijayendra Prasad.

His wife M. M. Srivalli works as a line producer in films. His elder son, Kaala Bhairava, is a singer and has sung for his father's numerous compositions ("Dandalayya" song and Naatu Naatu). His younger son, Sri Simha, made his debut with Mathu Vadalara (2019).

== Career ==
Keeravani began his career as an assistant music director with Telugu composer K. Chakravarthy and Malayalam composer C. Rajamani in 1987. He assisted in movies such as Collectorgari Abbayi and Bharathamlo Arjunudu in the late 1980s. During this time, he also sought the guidance of the veteran lyricist Veturi for over a year.

Keeravani's first big break as an independent musician came with the film Kalki in 1990, but the film never got released and the soundtrack also went unnoticed. It was director Mouli's 1990 film Manasu Mamatha that brought him to the limelight and was considered his first released movie. However, it was Ram Gopal Varma's blockbuster film Kshana Kshanam (1991) that made Keeravani an established music director. All the songs of this movie went on to become top chartbusters and Keeravani was flooded with offers from all across south Indian film industries. His first major Hindi film was Criminal (1994).

Keeravani mentions Ilaiyaraaja, John Williams and Nusrat Fateh Ali Khan as composers who influenced him. Some of the films which inspired his music include Fiddler on the Roof (1971), Jaws, Coming to America (1988), and Phone Booth (2002).

== Awards and nominations ==
Keeravani won the Oscar for Best Original Song and the Golden Globe Award for Best Original Song for "Naatu Naatu" for the 2022 Indian film RRR. He received a National Film Award for Best Music Direction for the 1997 Telugu film Annamayya. He is also a recipient of eight Filmfare Awards, eleven Andhra Pradesh state Nandi Awards, and a Tamil Nadu State Film Award. He was also nominated for Saturn Award for Best Music for Baahubali: The Beginning (2015).

== See also ==
- List of Indian winners and nominees of the Golden Globe Awards
- List of Indian winners and nominees of the Academy Awards
