= List of accolades received by Magadheera =

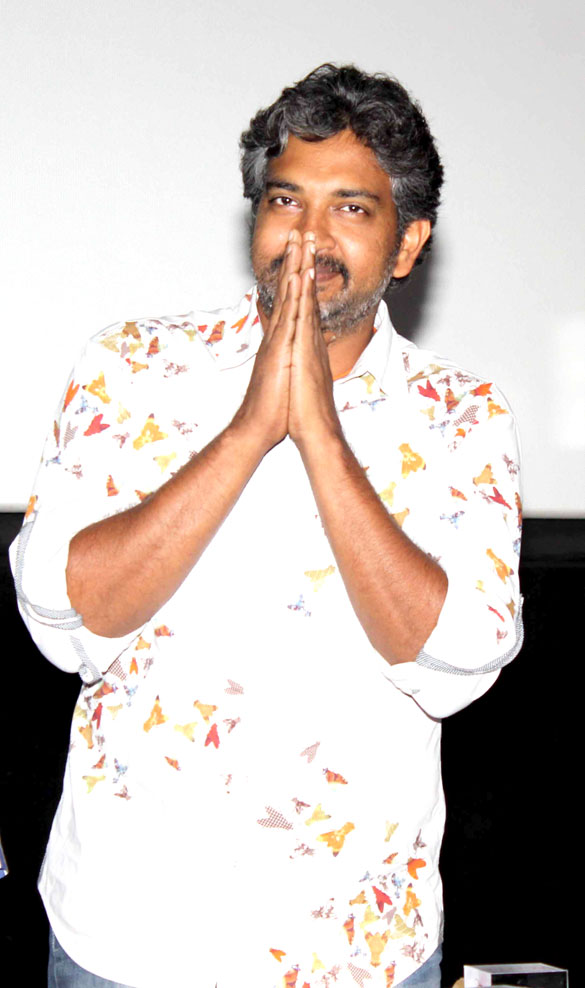
- S. S. Rajamouli won several awards in recognition of his work as a director for Magadheera.
Accolades
Award	Won	Nominated
CineMAA Awards	11	13
Filmfare Awards South	6	10
Nandi Awards	7	7
National Film Awards	2	2
Santosham Film Awards	9	9
South Scope Cine Awards	6	10
- Total number of awards and nominations (Note: Awards in certain categories do not have prior nominations and only winners are announced by the jury. For simplification and to avoid errors, each award in this list has been presumed to have had a prior nomination.)
Totals	43	54
- References

Magadheera is a 2009 Indian Telugu-language film directed by S. S. Rajamouli, and produced by Allu Aravind and B. V. S. N. Prasad. The film stars Ram Charan and Kajal Aggarwal, with Dev Gill and Srihari in supporting roles. It was edited by Kotagiri Venkateswara Rao and the cinematographer was K. K. Senthil Kumar. The visual effects were designed by R. C. Kamalakannan, with assistance from Adel Adili and Pete Draper. Magadheera is the first Telugu film to list a "visual effects producer" in its credits. The film's soundtrack was composed by M. M. Keeravani, who collaborated with Kalyani Malik to score the background music. The film revolves around four people who lived in the 17th century; they die before their wishes are fulfilled and are reborn after 400 years. Produced on a budget of ₹350 million (US$3.6 million), Magadheera was released on 31 July 2009, and grossed ₹1.5 billion (US$16 million) worldwide. It remained the highest-grossing Telugu film ever for five years until its takings were exceeded by those of Attarintiki Daredi in 2013. The film garnered awards and nominations in several categories; it was particularly praised for its direction, performances of the film's cast, cinematography, and visual effects. As of December 2010, the film has won forty-three awards.

At the 57th National Film Awards, Magadheera won the awards for Best Choreography and Best Special Effects. The film won nine awards at the 2010 Nandi Awards ceremony, including those for Best Popular Feature Film, Best Director and Best Special Effects. At the 57th Filmfare Awards South ceremony it won six awards, including the awards for Best Film, Best Director, and Best Actor, from ten nominations. Aggarwal and Srihari also garnered nominations for Best Actress and Best Supporting Actor, respectively. Magadheera received thirteen nominations at the 2010 CineMAA Awards ceremony and won eleven awards, including those for Best Film, Best Director, Best Actor, and Best Cinematography. Aggarwal and Keeravani were nominated for Best Actress and Best Music Director, respectively. The film received ten nominations at the 2010 South Scope Cine Awards ceremony and won six awards, including those for Best Film, Best Director, Best Actor, and Best Cinematography.

== Accolades ==
Award	Date of ceremony (Note: Date is linked to the article about the awards held that year, wherever possible.)	Category	Recipient(s) and nominee(s)	Result	Ref.
CineMAA Awards	18 August 2010	Best Film	Allu Aravind	Won	
CineMAA Awards	18 August 2010	Best Director	S. S. Rajamouli	Won	
CineMAA Awards	18 August 2010	Best Actor - Male	Ram Charan	Won	
CineMAA Awards	18 August 2010	Best Actor - Female	Kajal Aggarwal	Nominated	
CineMAA Awards	18 August 2010	Best Producer	Allu Aravind	Won	
CineMAA Awards	18 August 2010	Best Cinematographer	K. K. Senthil Kumar	Won	
CineMAA Awards	18 August 2010	Best Editor	Kotagiri Venkateswara Rao	Won	
CineMAA Awards	18 August 2010	Best Music Director	M. M. Keeravani	Nominated	
CineMAA Awards	18 August 2010	Best Male Playback Singer	Anuj Gurwara (for song "Panchadara Bomma")	Won	
CineMAA Awards	18 August 2010	Best Female Playback Singer	Nikita Nigam (for song "Dheera Dheera")	Won	
CineMAA Awards	18 August 2010	Best Lyricist	Chandrabose (for song "Panchadara Bomma")	Won	
CineMAA Awards	18 August 2010	Best Art Director	R. Ravinder	Won	
CineMAA Awards	18 August 2010	Best Choreographer	Prem Rakshith	Won	
Filmfare Awards South	7 August 2010	Best Film	Allu Aravind	Won	
Filmfare Awards South	7 August 2010	Best Director	S. S. Rajamouli	Won	
Filmfare Awards South	7 August 2010	Best Actor	Ram Charan	Won	
Filmfare Awards South	7 August 2010	Best Actress	Kajal Aggarwal	Nominated	
Filmfare Awards South	7 August 2010	Best Supporting Actor	Srihari	Nominated	
Filmfare Awards South	7 August 2010	Best Cinematographer	K. K. Senthil Kumar	Won	
Filmfare Awards South	7 August 2010	Best Music Director	M. M. Keeravani	Won	
Filmfare Awards South	7 August 2010	Best Male Playback	Anuj Gurwara (for song "Panchadara Bomma")	Won	
Filmfare Awards South	7 August 2010	Best Female Playback	Nikita Nigam (for song "Dheera Dheera")	Nominated	
Filmfare Awards South	7 August 2010	Best Lyricist	Chandrabose (for song "Panchadara Bomma")	Nominated	
Nandi Awards	23 March 2012	Best Popular Feature Film	Allu Aravind	Won	
Nandi Awards	23 March 2012	Best Director	S. S. Rajamouli	Won	
Nandi Awards	23 March 2012	Best Editor	Kotagiri Venkateswara Rao	Won	
Nandi Awards	23 March 2012	Best Art Director	R. Ravinder	Won	
Nandi Awards	23 March 2012	Best Choreographer	K. Siva Shankar	Won	
Nandi Awards	23 March 2012	Best Audiographer	Radhakrishna	Won	
Nandi Awards	23 March 2012	Best Costume Designer	Rama Rajamouli	Won	
Nandi Awards	23 March 2012	Best Special Effects	R. C. Kamalakannan	Won	
Nandi Awards	23 March 2012	Special Jury Award	Ram Charan	Won	
National Film Awards	15 September 2010	Best Choreography	K. Siva Shankar	Won	
National Film Awards	15 September 2010	Best Special Effects	R. C. Kamalakannan	Won	
Santosham Film Awards	10 August 2010	Best Film	Allu Aravind	Won	
Santosham Film Awards	10 August 2010	Best Actor	Ram Charan	Won	
Santosham Film Awards	10 August 2010	Best Cinematographer	K. K. Senthil Kumar	Won	
Santosham Film Awards	10 August 2010	Best Editing	Kotagiri Venkateswara Rao	Won	
Santosham Film Awards	10 August 2010	Best Fights and Stunts	Peter Hein	Won	
Santosham Film Awards	10 August 2010	Best Art Direction	S. Ravinder	Won	
Santosham Film Awards	10 August 2010	Best Choreography	Prem Rakshith	Won	
Santosham Film Awards	10 August 2010	Best Publicity Design	Suresh Bujji	Won	
Santosham Film Awards	10 August 2010	Best Production Manager	Yoganand	Won	
South Scope Cine Awards	19 September 2010	Best Director	S. S. Rajamouli	Won	
South Scope Cine Awards	19 September 2010	Best Cinematographer	K. K. Senthil Kumar	Won	
South Scope Cine Awards	19 September 2010	Best Film	Magadheera	Won	
South Scope Cine Awards	19 September 2010	Best Actor	Ram Charan	Won	
South Scope Cine Awards	19 September 2010	Best Male Playback Singer	Anuj Gurwara	Won	
South Scope Cine Awards	19 September 2010	Best Lyricist	Chandrabose	Won	

== See also ==
- List of Telugu films of 2009
- Magadheera (soundtrack)
