= List of psychiatric hospitals in India =

This is a list of psychiatric hospitals and nursing homes in India.

== Assam ==
- Lokopriya Gopinath Bordoloi Regional Institute of Mental Health (LGBRIMH), Tezpur

== Delhi ==
Name	Funded by	Location
Institute of Human Behaviour and Allied Sciences	Government of NCT of Delhi	Shahdara
Tulasi Healthcare	Private	Mehrauli
Vidyasagar Institute of Mental Health and Neuro and Allied Sciences	Private	Nehru Nagar
Sukoon Health	Private	Gurugram

== Gurugram ==
Name	Funded by	Location
Tulasi Healthcare	Private	Gurugram

== Goa ==
- Institute of Psychiatry and Human Behaviour

== Jharkhand ==
=== Government psychiatric hospitals ===
- Central Institute of Psychiatry, Kanke Road, Ranchi

== Karnataka ==
=== Government psychiatric hospitals ===
- Dharwad Institute of Mental Health and Neurosciences, Dharwad
- National Institute of Mental Health and Neurosciences, Bangalore

=== Private psychiatric hospitals ===
- Sukoon Health, Bengaluru

== Kerala ==
- Mental Health Centre, Kozhikode

== Punjab ==
- Dr. Vidyasagar Institute of Mental Health, Amritsar

== Uttarakhand ==
- Maanavta Uttarakhand’s First Psychiatric and De-addiction Centre run by Psychiatrists, Dehradun

=== Government psychiatric hospitals ===
- State Mental Health Institute, Dehradun

== West Bengal ==
- Bangur Institute of Neurosciences
