= One Continuous Line: Art, Architecture and Urbanism of Aditya Prakash =

2020 book by Vikramaditya Prakash

- Cover
- Author: Vikramaditya Prakash
- Language: English
- Subject: Aditya Prakash, architectural history
- Genre: Nonfiction
- Published: 2020
- Publisher: Mapin Publishing
- Pages: 292
- ISBN: 9788189995683

One Continuous Line: Art, Architecture and Urbanism of Aditya Prakash is a book by Indian architectural historian, author and academic Vikramaditya Prakash. Prakash explores the life and work of his father Aditya Prakash, a prominent figure in the first generation of Indian modernists. The book delves into Aditya Prakash's multifaceted career, from his early modernist works to his advocacy for academic inquiry in architecture. Through illustrated narratives and visual essays, the book presents insights into Prakash's philosophy, influences, and contributions to Indian architecture and urbanism.

== Background ==
Vikramaditya Prakash is the son of Indian modernist architect Aditya Prakash. In an interview with the University of Washington, Prakash said that in trying to organize his father's extensive archive he and three volunteers started organizing his father's papers."It turned out there were over 1,000 architectural drawings, about 200 paintings, 600 art drawings, archival photographs, all kinds of things. I even found a regional, local museum drawing in his papers. It’s just an incredible treasure trove" said Prakash who admittedly never intended to write a book. While trying to select the best out of his father's archive to publish them in a dedicated collection, he started working on an introduction "initially thinking it would be a short text of around 5,000 to 10,000 words".

== Synopsis ==
The work consists of an introduction, six core chapters, and a foreword by architect and curator Maristella Casciato. (Note: Casciato is the Curator of Architecture at the Getty Research Institute.) The book provides a comprehensive exploration of the life and work of Aditya Prakash (1924–2008), a prominent figure in Indian architecture. Through a blend of documentary evidence and personal recollections, Prakash offers insights into his father's career, focusing on his contributions to architecture, art, and urbanism, particularly in the context of postcolonial India. The book delves into Aditya Prakash's adherence to a minimalist aesthetic and disciplined approach to design, influenced by his association with mentors like Pierre Jeanneret and Le Corbusier. It highlights notable projects such as the Tagore Theatre, showcasing Prakash's ability to balance asceticism with monumentality and his dedication to simplicity and economy in architectural expression. The book also explores Prakash's multifaceted interests, including community theater and painting, as well as his role as an educator at the Chandigarh College of Architecture, where he challenged established norms and encouraged critical analysis. Extensively illustrated with black-and-white photographs and emphasizing Prakash's artistic legacy beyond architecture, the book offers insights into the broader scope of his work within the context of Indian modernism and the Global South.

== Critical reception ==
In his review, landscape historian Manu P. Sobti praised the book for its innovative approach to biography within architectural historiography, highlighting Prakash's multifaceted persona and contributions to Indian modernism. Sobti commended Prakash's son, Vikramaditya Prakash, for skillfully weaving together personal observations and historical context, presenting a nuanced portrait of Aditya Prakash's life and work. The reviewer lauded the book's comprehensive structure, insightful narrative, and visually stunning presentation, anticipating its significant impact on architectural research, particularly in exploring the archives of the global South.

In their review, Peter Scriver and Amit Srivastava commended the book as a valuable addition to the discourse on modern Indian architecture. They particularly highlighted Prakash's methodological self-awareness, as he encourages a dispassionate analysis of his father's archive while blending it with personal recollections. The book is seen as a documentary contribution within a wave of publications focusing on post-independence Indian modernists, particularly as families compile and publish their archives. Scriver and Srivastava praised Prakash's counterpoint approach, which combines objective evidence with intimate insights into Aditya Prakash's career, thus enriching the understanding of his architectural legacy.

Elizabeth Grant wrote:

One Continuous Line is more than a biography, it is a critical assessment of a designer, painter and philosopher and other actors positioned in the complex webbing of modernity, post-colonialism, and nation building. Embellished with valuable photographs, the book delivers a riveting, compelling and intimate account of the formative Nehruvian era from the perspective of one of its most important actors.
