= Sarbjit Bahga =

Indian architect

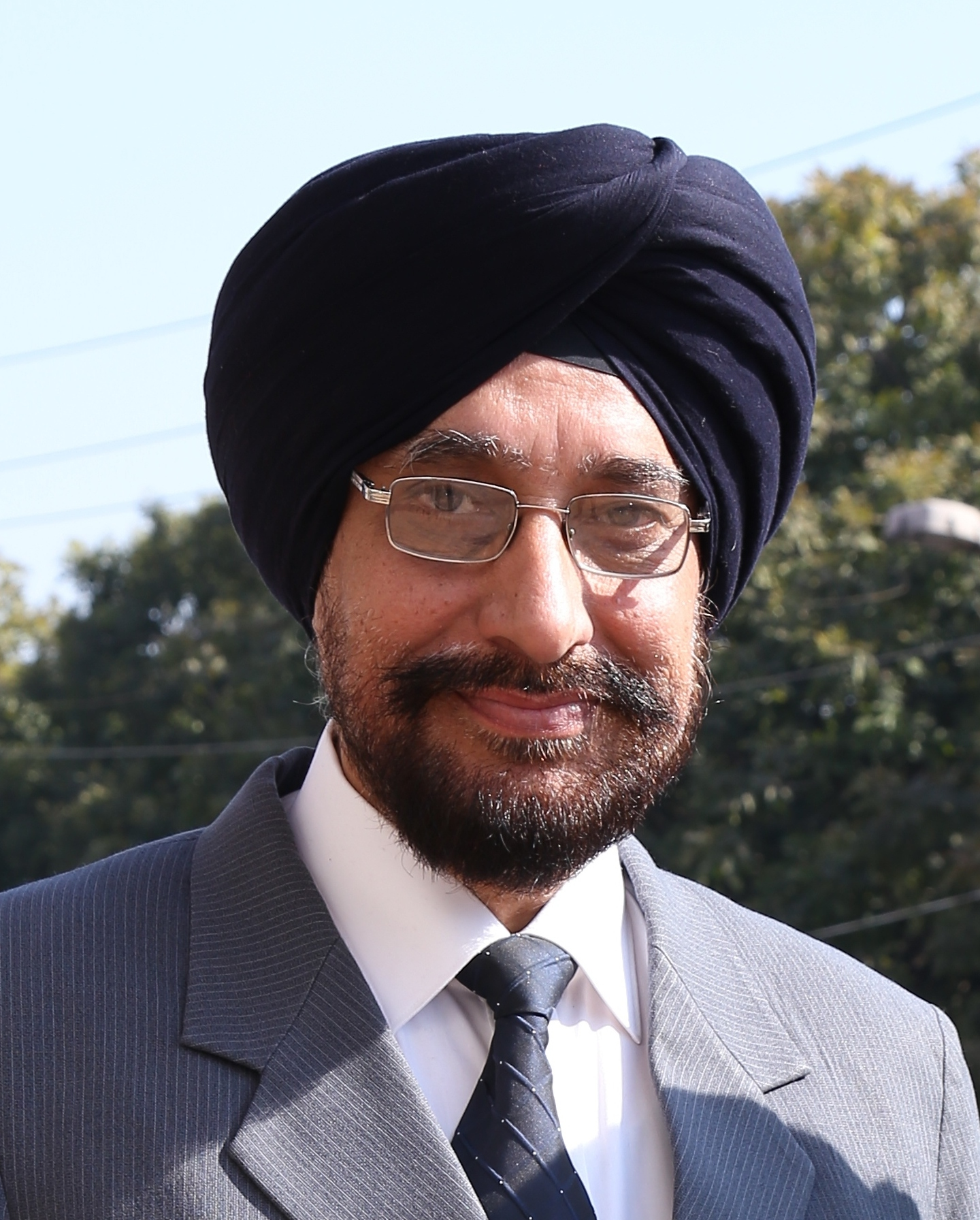
- Born: 27 May 1957 (age 69)
- Education: Chandigarh College of Architecture
- Occupation: Architect
- Buildings: Vidya Sagar Institute of Mental Health, Amritsar
- Website: www.sarbjit.bahga.in

Sarbjit Singh Bahga is an Indian architect, author and photo-artist. He is known for designing Vidya Sagar Institute of Mental Health, Amritsar, India which was featured in the Guinness World Records for Longest covered concrete corridor.

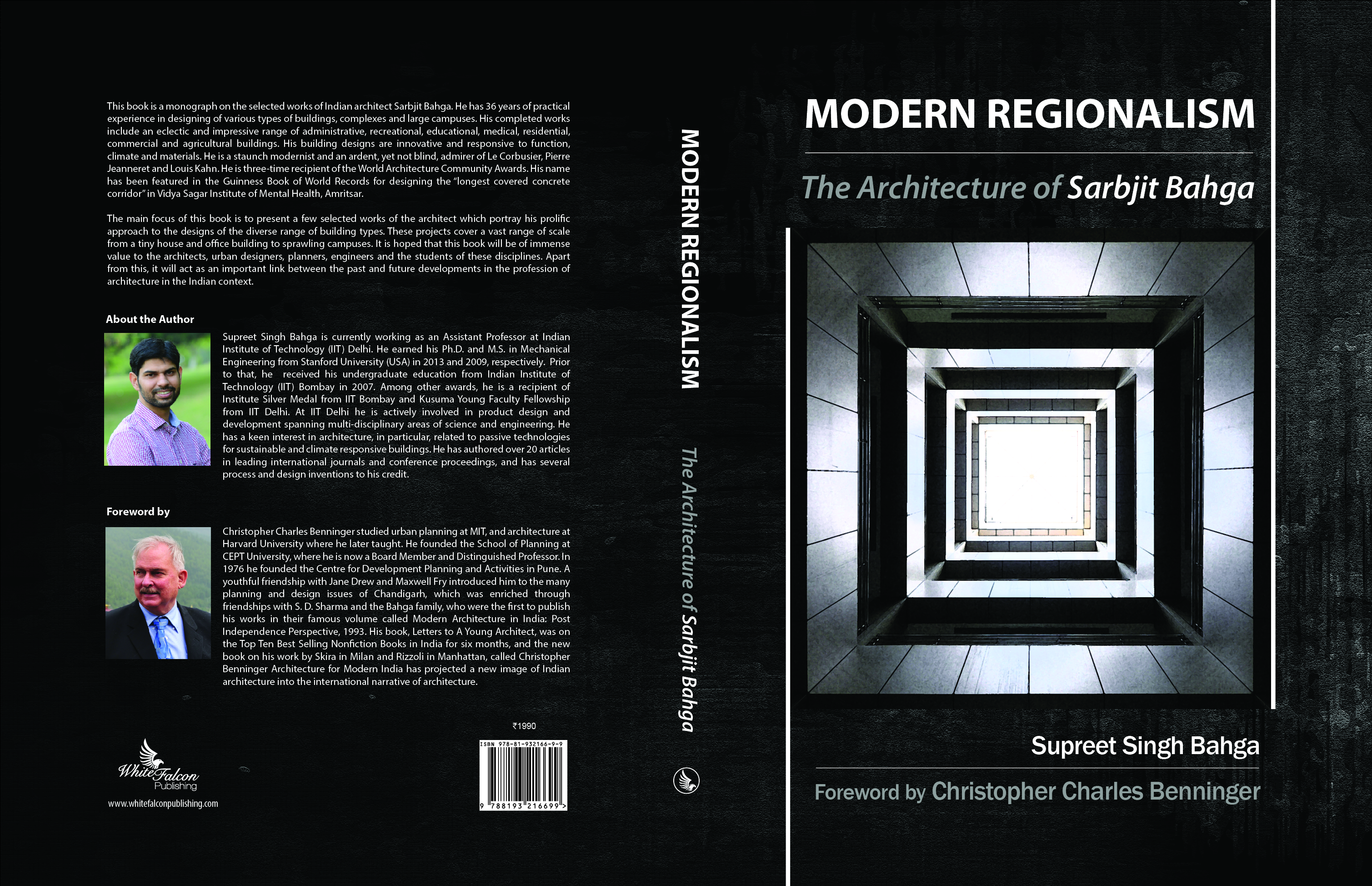
Modern Regionalism - The Architecture of Sarbjit Bahga.

== Career ==
Sarbjit Bahga obtained Bachelor of Architecture from Chandigarh College of Architecture in 1979. From 1980 to 2016, Bahga worked in the Department of Architecture, Punjab; Punjab Health Systems Corporation; and Punjab State Marketing Board on various positions. In 2016 he founded Bahga Design Studio LLP. During his career spanning more than three-and-a-half decades he has designed many architectural projects which include administrative, recreational, educational, medical, residential, commercial, and agricultural buildings. His selected works are published in the book titled Modern Regionalism: The Architecture of Sarbjit Bahga.

== Selected works ==
- Punjab Mandi Board Head Office, Mohali
- Agriculture Bhawan, Mohali
- Market Committee Office, Lehragaga
- Sports Stadium, Badal
- Sports Stadium, Bathinda
- Hockey Stadium, Bathinda
- Guru Gobind Singh Stadium, Jalandhar
- State Institute of Nursing and Paramedical Sciences, Badal
- Dr. Vidyasagar Institute of Mental Health, Amritsar
- Civil Hospital, Samana
- Yatri Niwas, Talwandi Sabo
- Fish market, Ludhiana
- Centre of Excellence for Fruits, Hoshiarpur
- Modern Cattle Sheds, Punjab

== Notable publications ==
- Modern Architecture in India: Post-Independence Perspective, Galgotia Publishing Company, 1993
- New Indian Homes: An Architectural Renaissance, Galgotia Publishing Company, 1996
- Le Corbusier & Pierre Jeanneret: Footprints on the Sands of Indian Architecture, Galgotia Publishing Company, 2000
- Trees in Urban Habitat, White Falcon Publishing Solutions, 2014
- Contemporary Indian Houses, White Falcon Publishing Solutions, 2014
- Landscaping Human Habitat, White Falcon Publishing Solutions, 2015
- Architectural Rendering: Hand-Drawn Perspectives and Sketches, White Falcon Publishing Solutions, 2021
- New Indian Architecture: 1947-2020, White Falcon Publishing Solutions, 2022

== Awards and recognition ==
- Featured in the Guinness World Records for designing Longest covered concrete corridor (1018.89m) in Vidya Sagar Institute of Mental Health, Amritsar in 2014.
- World Architecture Community Award in the 13th Cycle, for the design of Market Committee Office, Lehragaga, Punjab in 2013.
- World Architecture Community Award in the 16th Cycle, for the design of CLTA Cafeteria, Chandigarh in 2014.
- World Architecture Community Award in the 17th Cycle, for the design of Nocturnal House, Chhatbir Zoo, Punjab in 2014.
- Celebration of Architecture Award for the designs of Multipurpose Sports Stadiums in Punjab by the Business India Exhibitions and Inside Outside Magazine in 2012.
- First Friday Forum Award For Creative Excellence in 2017.
