= Aditya Prakash =

Aditya Prakash may refer to:

- Aditya Prakash (badminton) (born 1990), Indian badminton player
- Aditya Prakash (architect) (1924–2008), Indian architect
