= Magadheera (soundtrack) =

2009 soundtrack album by M. M. Keeravani

- Soundtrack cover art

Soundtrack album by M. M. Keeravani
- Released: 28 June 2009
- Recorded: 2008–2009
- Genre: Feature film soundtrack
- Length: 25:42
- Language: Telugu
- Labels: Aditya Music; Lahari Music (One Song)
- Producer: M. M. Keeravani

M. M. Keeravani chronology
Veera Madakari (2009)	Magadheera (2009)	Lahore (2010)

Magadheera is the feature film soundtrack of the 2009 Telugu-language romantic fantasy action film of the same name directed by S. S. Rajamouli. M. M. Keeravani composed the soundtrack and he worked with Kalyani Malik for the film's background score. The soundtrack consists of six songs whose lyrics were penned by Bhuvanachandra, Chandrabose and Keeravani himself.

== Development ==
S. S. Rajamouli's regular composer M. M. Keeravani was selected to compose the film's soundtrack and background score while Kalyani Malik helped him in the latter. Keeravani's hit song "Bangaru Kodipetta" from the film Gharana Mogudu, starring Ram Charan's father Chiranjeevi, was remixed for this film and the lyrics by Bhuvanachandra were retained unchanged for the remix version too. In early April 2008, Keeravani completed composing a romantic song which was shot on Ram Charan and Kajal Aggarwal at Dholavira. Daler Mehndi sang for the song Jorsey in this film's soundtrack.

Anuj Gurwara sang the song "Panchadara Bomma" in the soundtrack which marked his official debut as a singer in Telugu cinema. Teesha Nigam, sister of singer Sonu Nigam, sang the duet "Dheera Dheera" along with Keeravani and her name was credited then as Nikitha Nigam. That song gave her break in Telugu cinema as a playback singer. Apart from the remix of "Bangaru Kodipetta", the rest five were penned by Chandrabose and Keeravani himself. Rest of the singers who performed for the songs in the soundtrack were Ranjith, Deepu, Jassie Gift, Rita, Geetha Madhuri and Shivani. Chandrabose later revealed that the lyrics of the song "Panchadara Bomma" were tweaked as Rajamouli was unhappy with the previous version and asked him to improvise them.

For the Tamil version "Maaveeran", three additional tracks "Vandhaney", "Veera" and "Unai Serndhidavey" were added all sung by Janaki Iyer and written by A. R. P. Jayaram. Apart from them, Vaali and A. R. P. Jayaram penned three songs each out of the remaining six. Ranjith, R. Jeyadev, Manicka Vinayagam and Janaki Iyer sung those songs.

== Track listing ==
Telugu Tracklist
No.	Title	Lyrics	Singer(s)	Length
1.	"Bangaru Kodipetta"	Bhuvanachandra	Ranjith, Sai Shivani	6:02
2.	"Dheera Dheera Dheera"	Chandrabose	Nikitha Nigam, M. M. Keeravani	4:48
3.	"Panchadara Bomma"	Chandrabose	Anuj Gurwara, Rita	4:45
4.	"Jorsey"	Chandrabose	Daler Mehndi, Geetha Madhuri	4:37
5.	"Naakosam Nuvvu"	M. M. Keeravani	Deepu, Geetha Madhuri	3:52
6.	"Anaganagaga"	M. M. Keeravani	Jassie Gift	2:58
Total length:				25:42

Tamil Tracklist
No.	Title	Lyrics	Singer(s)	Length
1.	"Ponnana Kozhi Ponnu"	Vaali	Ranjith, Janaki Iyer	5:49
2.	"Vandinathai Summa Summa"	Vaali	R. Jeyadev, Janaki Iyer	4:47
3.	"Aasai Aasai"	Vaali	R. Jeyadev, Janaki Iyer	4:51
4.	"Pidichirukku"	A. R. P. Jayaram	R. Jeyadev, Janaki Iyer	3:49
5.	"Pesavey Pesatha"	A. R. P. Jayaram	Manicka Vinayagam, R. Jeyadev, Janaki Iyer	5:45
6.	"Kadha Kadha Kadha Kadha"	A. R. P. Jayaram	R. Jeyadev, Janaki Iyer	3:24
7.	"Vandhaney"	A. R. P. Jayaram	Janaki Iyer	0:51
8.	"Veera"	A. R. P. Jayaram	Janaki Iyer	1:18
9.	"Unai Serndhidavey"	A. R. P. Jayaram	R. Jeyadev, Janaki Iyer	1:09
Total length:				31:43

All lyrics are written by Sudhamsu.

Malayalam Tracklist
No.	Title	Singer(s)	Length
1.	"Manin Thullikal"	Vidhu Prathap, Akhila Anand	3:48
2.	"Punnara Pedamane"	Afsal, Soniya	5:47
3.	"Panchasara Umma"	Vidhu Prathap, Manjari	4:48
4.	"Dheera Dheera"	Sudeep Kumar, Manjari	4:49
5.	"Chemmana Cheppalle"	Anwar Sadath, Saritha Rajeev	5:45
6.	"Hey Anaganaga"	Jassie Gift	3:30
Total length:			24:57

== Release ==
The Telugu version was launched at Shilpakala Vedika in Hyderabad on 28 June 2009. Chiranjeevi released the audio cassette and presented the first one to Aswini Dutt, K. Raghavendra Rao and D. Ramanaidu. Pawan Kalyan launched the audio CD and gave it to Srihari, Allu Arjun and Srikanth. Trailers of the film were also screened prior to the audio release. Aditya Music distributed the audio into the market.

The Tamil version was launched on 25 April 2011 at a star hotel in Chennai and Sify called it the biggest audio launch for a dubbed film till date. Kamal Haasan handed over the first copy to Mani Ratnam and the invitees included directors K. S. Ravikumar, A. M. Rathnam, Dharani, Suhasini Maniratnam and Udhayanidhi Stalin apart from the film's cast and crew. Two songs and the trailer of the film were screened for the special invitees and the media. S. P. Charan and Divya anchored the event. Sony Music marketed the album.

== Reception ==
M. M. Keeravani's work received mixed reviews from critics. The Hindu wrote "Music by M.M. Keeravani does rock, with foot-tapping numbers and the background score by Keeravani and Kalyani Malik is in sync with the mood of the scene." Rediff.com wrote "Keeravani's music sounds good on screen. Keeravani and Kalyani Malik's background score is also in tune and does not overshadow the image." IndiaGlitz wrote "Overall, the songs have not been upto [sic] the hype that was created and despite the presence of big names like Keeravani, Daler Mehndi, it has come across as a regular album. But then, the key factor here is the presentation of these songs and if they are grand and captivating the audio graphs might go up. This is a mix of melody, mass and romantic numbers so all genres of audience will find their songs here." In contrast, Sify opined that Keeravani missed the magic this time while Karthik S of Milliblog panned the album completely and called Bangaru Kodipetta's remix terribly disappointing.

Despite mixed reviews, the album turned out to be a successful one and the songs "Panchadara Bomma" and "Dheera Dheera" turned out to be chartbusters. Rediff.com rated it as one of the top 5 soundtracks of Telugu cinema in 2009. On the other hand, the Tamil version received positive response. Behindwoods.com stated that Keeravani's music added value to the film and praised the placement of those songs. IndiaGlitz wrote "Maaveeran songs, on the whole, is a mix of peppy, soft, contemporary and stylish numbers. It's like tasting mouthwatering dishes at a hotel in the heartland of Andhra Pradesh."

== Controversies ==
A folk lyricist Vangapandu Prasada Rao accused that his 40-year-old folk song "Em Pillado Eldamostavaa", which featured in T. Krishna's directorial Ardharathri Swatanthram, was used by film director Rajamouli and Allu Aravind in the song "Jorsey" without taking his consent. Activists of PDSU, POW and PYL staged a protest demonstration in front of the Ashok 70 MM theater in Nizamabad where the film was being screened demanding the removal of that song. The agitators said that the song was written by Vangapandu during the famous Srikakulam armed struggle some four decades ago and was misused and used to portray an obscene duet in the movie. They added that the song was used without the permission from the writer and the depiction in a way would help defeating the very purpose of the song written for the revolutionary spirit and demanded a public apology by the makers to Vangapandu. Few reports stated that Vangapandu demanded Allu Aravind to pay a compensation of ₹50 lakh.

== Awards and nominations ==
Ceremony	Category	Nominee	Result
57th Filmfare Awards South	Best Music Director	M. M. Keeravani	Won
57th Filmfare Awards South	Best Male Playback	Anuj Gurwara ("Panchadara Bomma")	Won
57th Filmfare Awards South	Best Female Playback	Nikita Nigam ("Dheera Dheera")	Nominated
57th Filmfare Awards South	Best Lyricist	Chandrabose ("Panchadara Bomma")	Nominated
CineMAA Awards	Best Male Playback	Anuj Gurwara ("Panchadara Bomma")	Won
CineMAA Awards	Best Female Playback	Nikita Nigam ("Dheera Dheera")	Won
CineMAA Awards	Best Lyricist	Chandrabose ("Panchadara Bomma")	Won
South Scope Cine Awards	Best Male Playback Singer	Anuj Gurwara	Won
South Scope Cine Awards	Best Lyricist	Chandrabose	Won
