= Anuj Gurwara =

Indian actor and singer

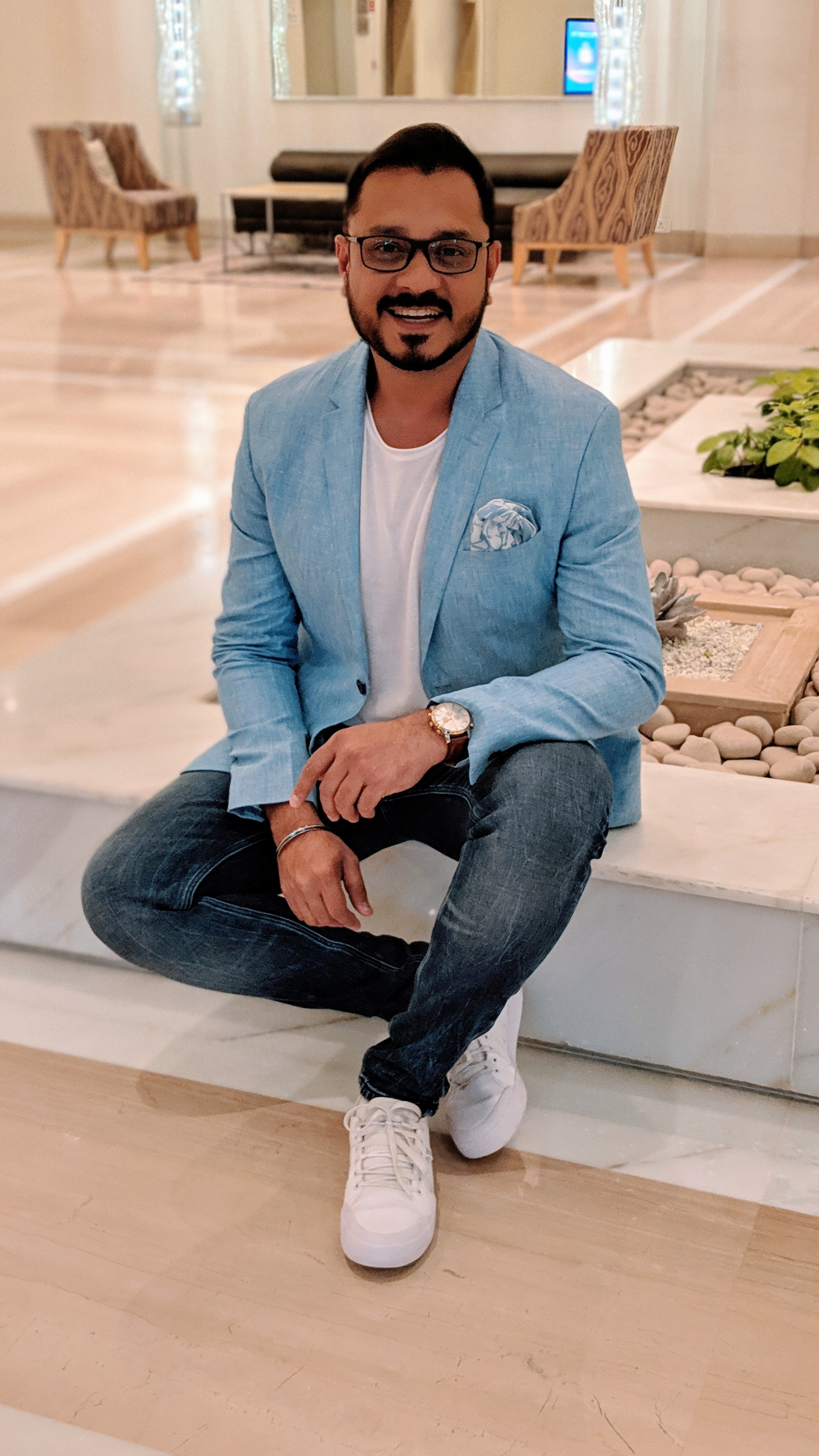
- Anuj Gurwara
- Born: 9 June 1981 (age 45); Hyderabad, Andhra Pradesh, India (now in Telangana, India)
- Occupations: Playback Singer, MC, Actor, Voice Artist, Radio Jockey, Television Show Host
- Spouse: Hana Mohsin Khan (m. 2023)

Anuj Gurwara (born 9 June 1981) is an Indian singer and actor, who has won a Filmfare Award for his singing in the film Magadheera (2009).

== Early life ==
His father is Yogendra Gurwara, and mother is Jyoti Gurwara.

Anuj did his schooling in Sherwood and later graduated in Psychology and Advertising from Nizam College, Hyderabad. He was an active part of Arts and Music in school and college.

== Career ==
Anuj started his career working as a copywriter and content developer for various design firms and advertising agencies. After a short stint with a theatre group, he decided to pursue a career in entertainment.

=== Singer ===
In 2009 Anuj debuted as playback singer for Tollywood, not knowing how to speak Telugu. Under the direction of M. M. Keeravani, he sang a song, "Panchadara Bomma", for the Telugu film, Magadheera, one of the highest-grossing Telugu films ever. Along with the success of the film, the song, Panchadara Bomma, grew to be a massive hit and established Anuj as a fresh new voice in the world of music.

S. S. Rajamouli, the director of Magadheera, stated in an article - "I opine that Panchadara Bomma is the best song in my career". The song was also declared Top Telugu Song of the year 2009 by various media channels, including newspapers, FM radios and television channels, winning awards across various platforms.

The song "Panchadara Bomma" is said to have singularly generated revenues of over Rs 30 million from mobile phone ringtone downloads, which is said to be a record that no other song in Telugu cinema has yet matched.

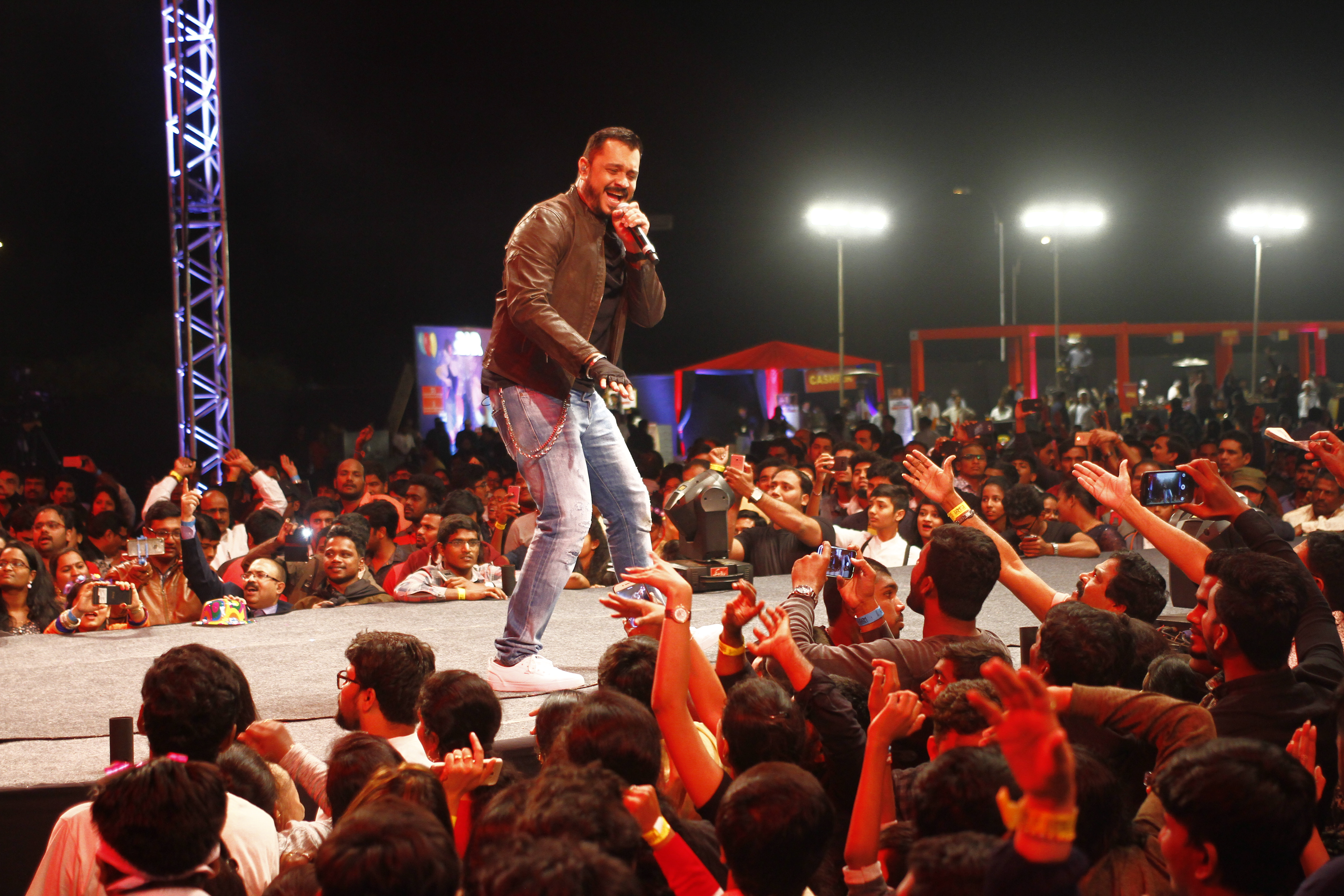
Anuj performing live

Panchadara Bomma also earned Anuj his first ever Filmfare trophy. He was awarded Best Male Playback Singer in a star-studded ceremony in Chennai on 7 August 2010. Anuj's Hindi singing debut happened in 2012, in the form of Makkhi, the dubbed version of the superhit Telugu film, Eega. Apart from singing two songs in then film, he also penned the lyrics for two songs.

In 2019, Anuj released his first ever independent single - Amma Bawa - India's first ever Hyderabadi (Deccani/Dakhni) Pop Song. Composed by Sanket Sane, Anuj wrote and sang the song and released it on Times Music YouTube channel. The song went on to cross the 2 million views mark on YouTube within 9 days of its release, becoming a runaway hit.

=== Live Performances ===
Anuj has been actively performing in India and abroad at various corporate shows and public events after his award-winning singing debut.

He has performed across the United States of America and invited by the Indian associations in various cities, he has also performed in New York, New Jersey, Washington DC, San Francisco, Sacramento, Phoenix, Detroit, Dallas, San Antonio, Columbus, Philadelphia, Chicago, Bloomington, etc.

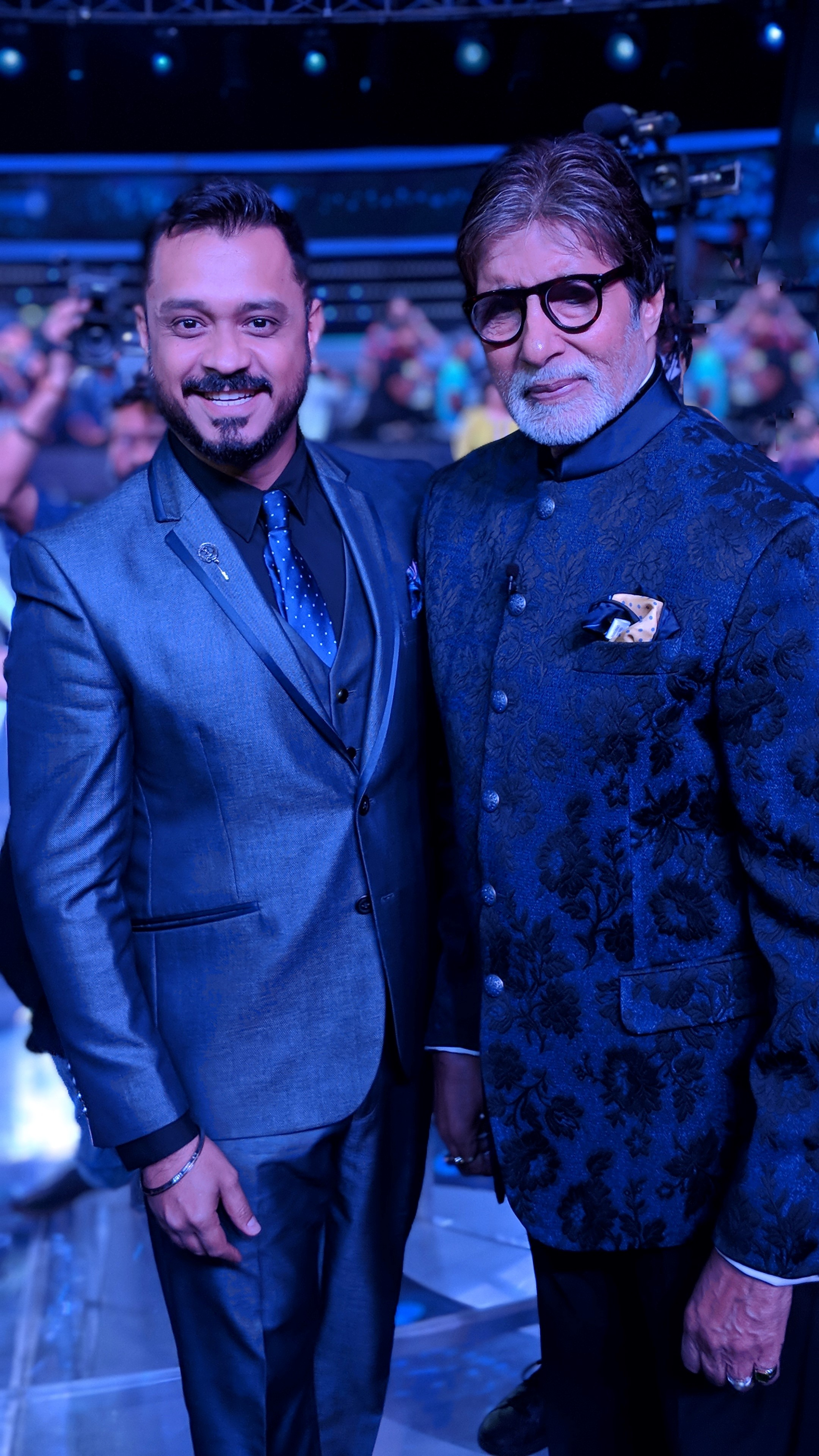
With Amitabh Bachchan after hosting the launch of Kaun Banega Crorepati – 2018

Anuj has also performed in Singapore, Malaysia, Mauritius, Kuwait, Istanbul, France, Hong Kong and other countries.

=== Master of Ceremonies ===
As an RJ and an actor, Anuj eventually diversified himself as an MC. Anuj is established Master of Ceremonies and hosted many formal events, large parties and concerts. He has hosted events of different scales for a large number of corporate companies and Event Managers.

Anuj's understanding of the pulse of an event, appropriate sense of humor, smooth integration of various elements, personalized involvement with the crowd and respect to the theme of the event, has made him a preferred MC for various kinds of events.

He hosted the Times Food & Nightlife Awards in 10 cities across India from 2010 to 2020. Anuj was also the MC for all show launches of Sony TV from 2017 to 2022.

=== Actor - Film and Theater ===
In 2003, while pursuing acting, Anuj auditioned and bagged the role of a call-center supervisor in Nagesh Kukunoor's Hyderabad Blues 2. After this, Anuj auditioned for Sekhar Kammula. Sekhar had won the National Film Award for his directorial debut in Dollar Dreams. He cast Anuj as the 2nd lead for his film Anand, which released in 2004. Anand was a massive hit and Anuj received good reviews for his part.

After becoming an established playback singer in 2010, Anuj played a cameo in S. S. Rajamouli's hit film of 2010 Maryada Ramanna

He has been an active theater actor in Hyderabad since 1999, as part of various Theatre productions. He has showcased his talent as an actor and received positive reviews for his performance.

Anuj's theater production - The Open Couple, which he acted in and co-produced as well, earned nominations in five categories at the prestigious Mahindra Excellence in Theater Awards 2014, including a Best Actor nomination for him. After performing across the country, the play was also invited to be a part of the National Centre for the Performing Arts' Cheer! Comedy festival, where they performed to a sold-out audience.

He went on to play 3 important characters in Lillete Dubey's acclaimed play - Gauhar, performing on some of the most prestigious stages across India, including Prithvi Theatre, NCPA, Siri Fort Auditorium, Tagore Theatre and many more.

Anuj is also part of cast of The Big Fat City, a cine-play written and directed by Mahesh Dattani for Netflix India. He has also played a part in Kartik Aaryan's film Dhamaka (2021 film), directed by Ram Madhvani.

=== Radio ===
In 2005, Anuj auditioned for All India Radio. He was selected and started hosting music-based shows on Yuvavani. Following All India Radio, Anuj worked for Radio Biryani, a private radio program setup that aired on the AIR frequency. That year, Anuj was awarded Best RJ (Hindi) for his show, Naach Meri Jaan. Anuj's joined Radio City 91.1 FM in 2006. The station was setting up in Hyderabad, one of the first private FM stations in the city.

Anuj began hosting an evening drive time show, Recharge, six days a week, from 8:00 pm to 11:00 pm. He played popular Hindi music and maintained high energy, wit and humor throughout the three hours. The show was a hit right in its early days. It struck a chord with the evening listenership that would drive back from work, and as Anuj would say, "recharge" their batteries on their way home. Anuj enjoyed immense popularity through the show. The name stuck with him and he is fondly called RJ "Recharge" Anuj to this day. Anuj shifted to the 5:00–9:00 pm time slot after a year, yet, commanded a dedicated listenership in Hyderabad.

Owing to his personal connect and popularity with listeners, he was awarded "No.1 RJ across All-India Radio City" for the year 2006–07. Anuj was soon shifted to the morning show, The Radio City Breakfast Show, from 7:00 am to 11:00 am, where he, with Shraddha, gave a fun and energetic start to the day. The chirpy, positive and friendly banter between them had Hyderabad tuned in every morning. In February 2008, Anuj was awarded "India's Best Radio Host for 2007-08" in a nationwide search.

Anuj quit Radio City in July 2008, after the station changed its language mix to a more regional sound.

=== Podcast ===
In 2021, Anuj published his own podcast - EdTalk with Anuj! A talk-show series focused on conversations around the Education system in India.

He is also the voice of Bhoot Bhulaiya - a horror podcast released in 2023. Produced by Kommune, it is based on stories by Jatin Bhasin.

=== Television (VJ) ===
In February 2006, Anuj became a VJ with SS Music. He won the VJ Factor 2, a hunt for VJs in South India. Out of about 5000 people who competed, Anuj was one of the four winners. It was a short-lived role as Anuj got an opportunity in Radio City, Hyderabad soon after.

=== Travel show host ===
Anuj hosted a travel-based television show called Road To Paradise, on Travel Trendz TV, in 2011. The show, in English and Hindi, was based on an adventure-exploration theme, where Anuj rode a bike across India, followed by two cameras, exploring hidden locales, tourist spots, music, dance, food and culture.

=== Voice work and writing ===
Anuj Gurwara is a freelance voice-over artist and script writer for various ad films, radio spots, documentaries, films, training modules and e-learning projects. In 2009, Gurwara became part of India's first ever PlayStation 2 game, Hanuman, as the voice of Hanuman in Hindi and English. He also regularly dubs for characters in films.

As writer and dubbing incharge, one of Gurwara's major projects was the entire language conversion of the Telugu film Eega into its Hindi version, Makkhi. Anuj was responsible for writing the Hindi version of the film, casting voice actors as well as directing the entire dub of the film, apart from dubbing for the main lead, played by Nani. Anuj also sang two songs, while debuting as lyricist for two songs.

Makkhi was a highly successful film, and Anuj received praise and reviews for its high-quality dubbing.

Anuj was the official Hindi voice of the Marvel Superhero Falcon till The Falcon and the Winter Soldier. He had dubbed for Falcon's voice in all of Marvel superhero films where the character appeared. For Captain America: Brave New World, he was replaced by Sparsh Korde, the reason stated for this by Anuj Gurwara was the change of dubbing studio.

He occasionally writes columns for newspapers as well.

== Personal life ==
In October 2023, Anuj married Hana Mohsin Khan.

== Discography (Singer) ==
Year	Film	Song	Composer	Language	Notes
2009	Magadheera	Panchadara Bomma	M. M. Keeravani	Telugu	57th Filmfare Awards South Award (Best Singer); MAA TV's CineMAA Awards (Best Singer); South Scope Cinema Award (Best Singer); Big 92.7FM Music Awards (Best Singer); Big 92.7FM Music Awards (Song of the Year); Mirchi Music Awards (Song of the Year); Radio City 91.1FM Awards (Best Singer); Radio City 91.1FM Awards (Song of the Year); Aalapana Music Awards (Best Singer)
2009	Pravarakhyudu	Emaipoyano (O My Love)	M. M. Keeravani	Telugu	
2010	Young India	Young India	M. M. Keeravani	Telugu	
2010	Vedam	Prapancham Naaventosthunte	M. M. Keeravani	Telugu	
2010	Bheemili Kabaddi Jattu	Nidadholu Pilla (Jathara Song)	V. Selvaganesh	Telugu	
2010	Badmash	Ninna Monna	Vandemataram Srinivas	Telugu	
2010	Jhummandi Naadam	Yem Sakkagunavro	M. M. Keeravani	Telugu	
2010	Adi Nuvve	Nuvvantene Ishtam	Jeevan Thomas	Telugu	
2010	Graduate	Ninnala Nenu Lenu	Sandeep	Telugu	
2010	26 Kingston	Nee Vallu Jadalo	Vishnu	Telugu	
2011	Anaganaga O Dheerudu	Ninnu Chudani	M. M. Keeravani	Telugu	
2011	Prema Kavali	Listen to My Heart	Anoop Rubens	Telugu	
2011	ATM	Nuvve Nuvve	Sukumar	Telugu	
2011	Badrinaath	Ambadari (Remix)	M. M. Keeravani	Telugu	
2011	Brahmigaadi Katha	Cheppaleni Maatayedho	Koti	Telugu	
2012	SMS (Shiva Manasulo Shruti)	"Chikki Chikki Baby	V. Selvaganesh	Telugu	
2012	Eega	Lava Lava	M. M. Keeravani	Telugu	
2012	Telugabbayi	Churakathilanti	Mejo Joseph	Telugu	
2012	Makkhi	Thoda Hans Ke	MM Kreem	Hindi	Hindi Singing Debut
2012	Makkhi	Lava Lava	MM Kreem	Hindi	Hindi Singing Debut
2019	Independent Single	Amma Bawa	Sanket Sane	Dakhni	India's first ever Hyderabadi Pop Song. Anuj's debut as an independent singer-songwriter.
2021	Independent Single	Tujh Jaisa Na Koi	Rishabh Ravi	Hindi	
2023	Independent Single	Bas Paanch Minute	Rishabh Ravi	Hindi	

== Discography (Lyricist) ==
Year	Film	Song	Singer	Composer	Language	Notes
2012	Makkhi	"Thoda Hans Ke"	Anuj Gurwara	MM Kreem	Hindi	Debut
2012	Makkhi	"Sapnon Ki Ek"	Kaala Bhairava	MM Kreem	Hindi	Debut
2019	Independent Single	Amma Bawa	Anuj Gurwara	Sanket Sane	Hyderabadi	Debut as independent singer-songwriter.
2021	Independent Single	Tujh Jaisa Na Koi	Anuj Gurwara	Rishabh Ravi	Hindi	
2023	Independent Single	Bas Paanch Minute	Anuj Gurwara	Rishabh Ravi	Hindi	

== Filmography (Actor) ==
=== Films & Television ===
Year	Title	Role	Language
2004	Hyderabad Blues 2	Azam	Hindi/English
2004	Anand	Rahul Agarwal	Telugu
2004	Centipede	Ravi	English
2005	Tango Charlie	Soldier	Hindi
2010	Maryada Ramanna	Ghanshyamdas	Telugu
2013	Daanav Hunters	School Teacher	Hindi
2012	Road To Paradise	Travel Show Host	English
2016	24 (season 2)	Hotel Guest	Hindi
2017	The Big Fat City	Murali	Hindi
2021	Dhamaka	Manas Sethi	Hindi
2022	Anya's Tutorial	Anuj	Telugu
2024	Bhamakalapam 2	Antony Lobo	Telugu
2025	Drive	Ashutosh Bose	Telugu

== Filmography (Dialogue Writer) ==
Year	Film	Director	Language	Release	Notes
2012	Makkhi	S. S. Rajamouli	Hindi	October 2012	Dubbed version of Eega and also dubbed for Nani
2022	RRR	S. S. Rajamouli	Hindi	March 2022	Hindi Language Consultant

== Theatrical Productions (Actor) ==
Year	Play	Director	Production
1999	Maharshi Pingali's Sparsh	Maharshi Pingali	Spirare
2001	Shards (a compilation)	Noel Naveen Raj	The Theatre Buffs
2002	Neil Simon's The Good Doctor – series	Arvind Mittal	Expressions
2002	Neil Simon's God's Favorite	Pranava Singhal	Dramatic Circle Hyderabad
2003	David Ives' Sure Thing	Shriti Khandelwal	The Manna Makers
2003	Erich Segal's Love Story – a reading	Shriti Khandelwal	The Manna Makers
2003	Jean-Paul Sartre's The Respectful Prostitute	Shriti Khandelwal	The Manna Makers
2008	Joh Mann's Karaoke Killer	Mala Pasha	The Torn Curtains
2008	Farrukh Dhondy's Bollox	Pranava Singhal	Dramatic Circle Hyderabad
2008	Vaishali Bisht's Write, Rite & Right	Vaishali Bisht	Vaishali Bisht Theatre Workshop
2008	Alan Bennett's Habeas Corpus	Pranava Singhal	Dramatic Circle Hyderabad
2009	Hugh Leonard's Pizzazz	RK Shenoy	Dramanon
2009	Woody Allen's God – a reading	Vijay Marur	The Little Theatre
2010	Jack Richardson's Gallows Humor	Vaishali Bisht	Vaishali Bisht Theatre Workshop
2013	Dario Fo's The Open Couple	Faraz Khan	71mm
2015–2016	Mahesh Dattani's Gauhar Jaan	Lillete Dubey	Primetime Theatre Co.

== Dubbing career ==
He is known for dubbing for Anthony Mackie as Sam Wilson / Falcon in Marvel Cinematic Universe films in Hindi.

== Dubbing roles ==
=== Live action television series ===
Program title	Actor	Character	Dub language	Original language	Original airdate	Dubbed airdate	Notes
House of Cards	Mahershala Ali	Remy Danton	Hindi	English	1 February 2013 – present		Hindi version available on Netflix India.
The Falcon and the Winter Soldier	Anthony Mackie	Sam Wilson (Marvel Cinematic Universe)	Hindi	English	19 March 2021 - April 2021		Hindi version available on Disney+ Hotstar

=== Live action films ===
Film title	Actor	Character	Dub language	Original language	Original year release	Dub year release	Notes
FM Fun Aur Masti		Hussain	Dakhni	Dakhni	2007		
Eega	Nani	Nani (Jani in Hindi version)	Hindi	Telugu	2012	2012	The Hindi dub was titled Makkhi. Anuj was also the dubbing director, script writer, lyricist, and playback singer in the Hindi version. Hindi dubbing performed alongside Sravana Bhargavi, who voiced Samantha Ruth Prabhu as Bindu, and Sudeep, who voiced himself as Sudeep in Hindi.
The Admiral: Roaring Currents	Unknown actor	Unknown character	Hindi; English	Korean; Japanese	2014	2014	
Roar: Tigers of the Sundarbans	Aadil Chahal	Kashmiri	English	Hindi	2014	2014	
Jason Bourne	Ato Essandoh	Craig Jeffers	Hindi	English	2016	2016	
Morgan	Boyd Holbrook	Skip Vronsky	Hindi	English	2016	2016	
Ghostbusters	Chris Hemsworth	Kevin Beckman	Hindi	English	2016	2016	
Passengers	Michael Sheen	Arthur	Hindi	English	2016	2016	
Star Wars: The Last Jedi	John Boyega	Finn	Hindi	English	2017	2017	Damandeep Singh Baggan dubbed this character in the previous film in this series.
Captain America: The Winter Soldier	Anthony Mackie	Sam Wilson / Falcon	Hindi	English	2014	2014	Performed alongside Joy Sengupta, who voiced Chris Evans as Steve Rogers / Captain America, and Manish Wadhwa, who voiced Sebastian Stan as Bucky Barnes / Winter Soldier in Hindi.
Avengers: Age of Ultron	Anthony Mackie	Sam Wilson / Falcon	Hindi	English	2015	2015	Performed alongside Joy Sengupta, who voiced Chris Evans as Steve Rogers / Captain America in Hindi.
Ant-Man	Anthony Mackie	Sam Wilson / Falcon	Hindi	English	2015	2015	Performed alongside Sahil Vaid, who voiced Paul Rudd as Scott Lang / Ant-Man in Hindi.
Captain America: Civil War	Anthony Mackie	Sam Wilson / Falcon	Hindi	English	2016	2016	Performed alongside Manish Wadhwa, who voiced Sebastian Stan as Bucky Barnes / Winter Soldier, and Sumit Kaul, who voiced Chadwick Boseman as T'Challa / Black Panther in Hindi.
Poorna: Courage Has No Limit		Newsreader	Hindi	Hindi	2017	2017	
Avengers: Infinity War	Anthony Mackie	Sam Wilson / Falcon	Hindi	English	2018	2018	Performed alongside Joy Sengupta, who voiced Chris Evans as Steve Rogers / Captain America, and Manish Wadhwa, who voiced Sebastian Stan as Bucky Barnes / Winter Soldier in Hindi.
Avengers: Endgame	Anthony Mackie	Sam Wilson / Falcon	Hindi	English	2019	2019	Performed alongside Joy Sengupta, who voiced Chris Evans as Steve Rogers / Captain America, and Manish Wadhwa, who voiced Sebastian Stan as Bucky Barnes / Winter Soldier in Hindi.
RRR	Edward Sonnenblick	Edward	Hindi	Telugu	2022	2022	Hindi Language consultant for the film
777 Charlie	Danish Sait	Karshan Roy	Hindi, Telugu, Tamil, Malayalam	Kannada	2022	2022	
Vijayanand			Hindi, Telugu	Kannada	2022	2022	
Music School (film)	Shaan (singer)	Albert		Hindi	2023	2023	

== Radio Shows ==
Year	Station	Show Name	Time
2005	All India Radio	Yuvavani English	
2005	Radio Biryani	Naach Meri Jaan	
		Aashiq Awara	
2006–2008	Radio City 91.1FM	Recharge!	Mon-Sat 8:00–11:00pm
		City Joyride	Mon-Sat 5:00–7:00pm
		The Radio City Breakfast Show	Mon-Sat 7:00–11:00am
		The Great Indian Countdown	Saturdays, 7:00–9:00pm
2012–2013	Radiowalla.in	Matinee Masala	Mondays 12noon-3pm

== Podcasts ==
Year	Title	Topic	Language	Producer	Notes
2022	EdTalk with Anuj!	Education	English	Anuj Gurwara	
2023	Bhoot Bhulaiya	Horror Stories	Hindi, English	Kommune	Voice: Anuj Gurwara | Stories: Jatin Bhasin | Writer: Deepti Mittal

== Awards ==
=== Playback singing ===
- 57th Filmfare Awards South - Best Male Playback Singer (Telugu) for "Panchadara Bomma" (Magadheera; 2009)
- MAA TV's CineMAA Awards - Best Male Playback Singer for "Panchadara Bomma" (Magadheera; 2009)
- South Scope Best Male Playback Singer Award for "Panchadara Bomma" (Magadheera; 2009)
- Mirchi Music Awards South 2010 - Listener's Choice Best Song of the Year for "Panchadara Bomma" (Magadheera; 2009)
- Mirchi Music Awards South 2010 - Best Playback Singer (Nominated) for "Panchadara Bomma" (Magadheera; 2009)
- Radio City 91.1 FM - Best Playback Singer (Male) for "Panchadara Bomma" (Magadheera; 2009)
- Radio City 91.1 FM - Best Song of the Year for "Panchadara Bomma" (Magadheera; 2009)
- Big 92.7 FM Ugadi Music Awards 2010 - Best Upcoming Singer of the Year for "Panchadara Bomma" (Magadheera; 2009)
- Big 92.7 FM Ugadi Music Awards 2010 - Best Love Song of the Year for "Panchadara Bomma" (Magadheera; 2009)
- Aalapana Music Awards 2010 - Best Upcoming Playback Singer for "Panchadara Bomma" (Magadheera; 2009)

=== Recognition ===
- Listed in Top 50 Achievers of South India for 2009-10 by Avant Garde Magazine Hyderabad (Nov 2010)
- Youth Achiever Award by The Passionate Foundation
- "Jade of Hyderabad" for exemplary services to the event industry, by Telangana Chamber of Events Industry

=== Radio jockey ===
- 2005 - Best RJ (Hindi) - Radio Lovers Association of Hyderabad - Radio Biryani
- 2007 - Best RJ (Male) - All India Radio City stations - Radio City 91.1fm - Radio City 91.1fm
- 2008 - India's Best Radio Host - Radio Duniya Magazine - Radio City 91.1fm

== See also ==
- Dubbing (filmmaking)
- List of Indian Dubbing Artists
