= Institute of Mental Health and Hospital =

Hospital in India, established in 1859

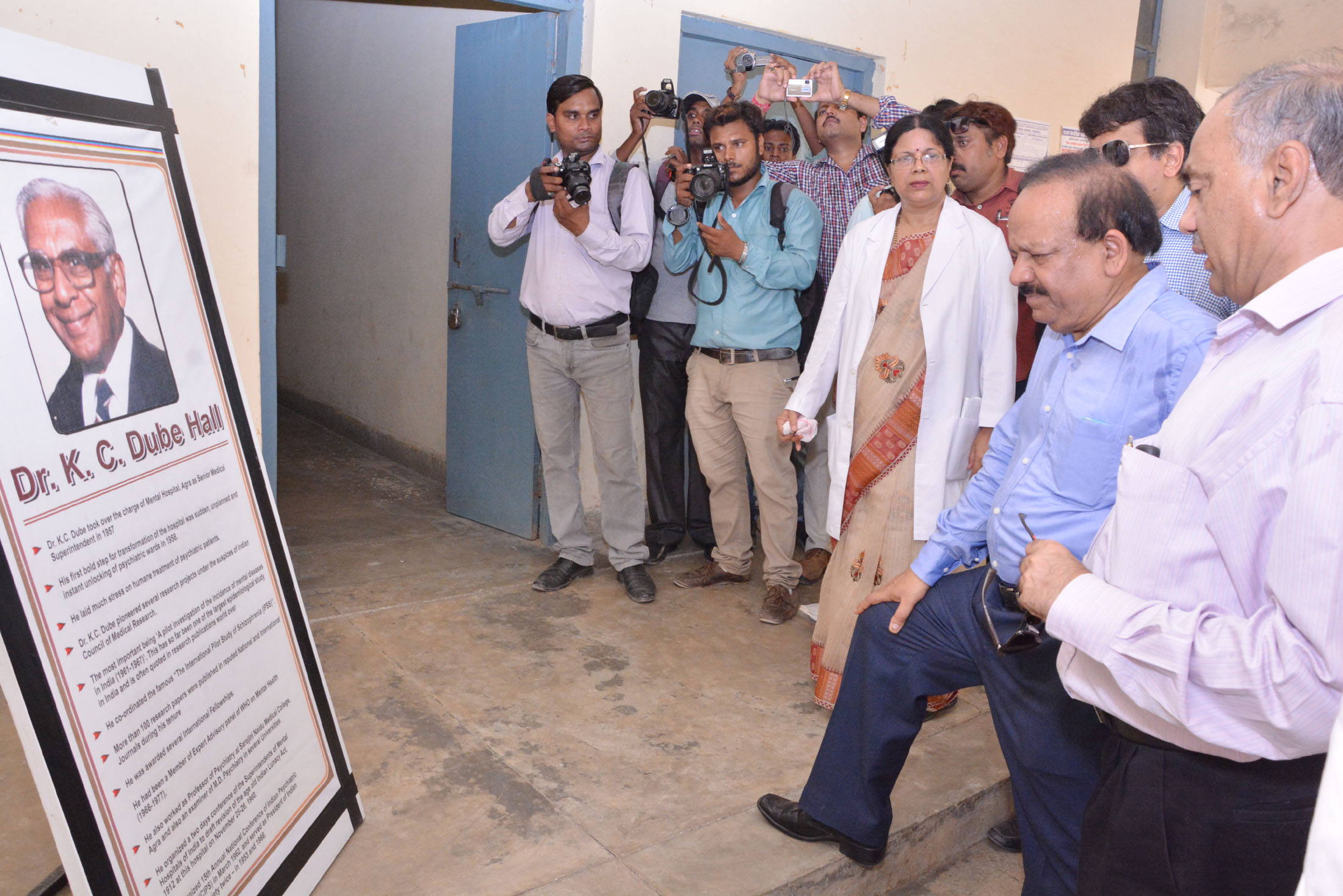
- Minister of Health and Family Welfare at IMHH, Agra
- Academic affiliations: Atal Bihari Vajpayee Medical University (2021 - present); Dr. Bhimrao Ambedkar University (erstwhile Agra University) (1939 - 2021)
- Location: Agra, Uttar Pradesh, India
- Campus: Urban
- Website: www.imhh.org.inn

The Institute of Mental Health and Hospital Agra, previously known as Agra Lunatic Asylum, was established in 1859, in British Raj by State government of Uttar Pradesh. The Institute of Mental Health and Hospital spread over a campus of 172.8 acres in Agra in front of Bilochpura Railway Station near Sikendra. The institute is very famous in India for its treatment, research and training on human mental disorder.

== History ==
The first asylum in India was founded by the British Government in 1745 in Bombay and the second in 1784 in Calcutta. A few more asylums were also founded by British Government in 1857 in big cities of India. In 1859, Agra asylum was also founded by the British Government. The Institute of Mental Health and Hospital Agra was established in September 1859, and renamed to Mental Hospital Agra in 1925. Previously, it was managed under the provisions of Indian Lunacy Act, 1912. Nowadays it is managed under the provisions of Mental Healthcare Act 2017. In 1994, it was again renamed to Agra Mansik Arogyashala by Honourable Supreme Court of India and made it an autonomous institution which aimed to improve treatment and care of mentally ill persons and provide professional education, training and research on mental health. On 8 February 2001, it again renamed as Institute of Mental Health and Hospital Agra.

== Professional courses ==
The Institute offers MD Psychiatry, DNB Psychiatry, M.Phil Clinical Psychology, M.Phil Psychiatric Social Work, Post Basic Diploma in Psychiatric Nursing, Short term training programme in Psychiatry.
