= Institute of Mental Health, Amritsar =

Coordinates: 31.661770°N 74.877217°E

Institute of Mental Health (Government Mental Hospital)
- Government of Punjab
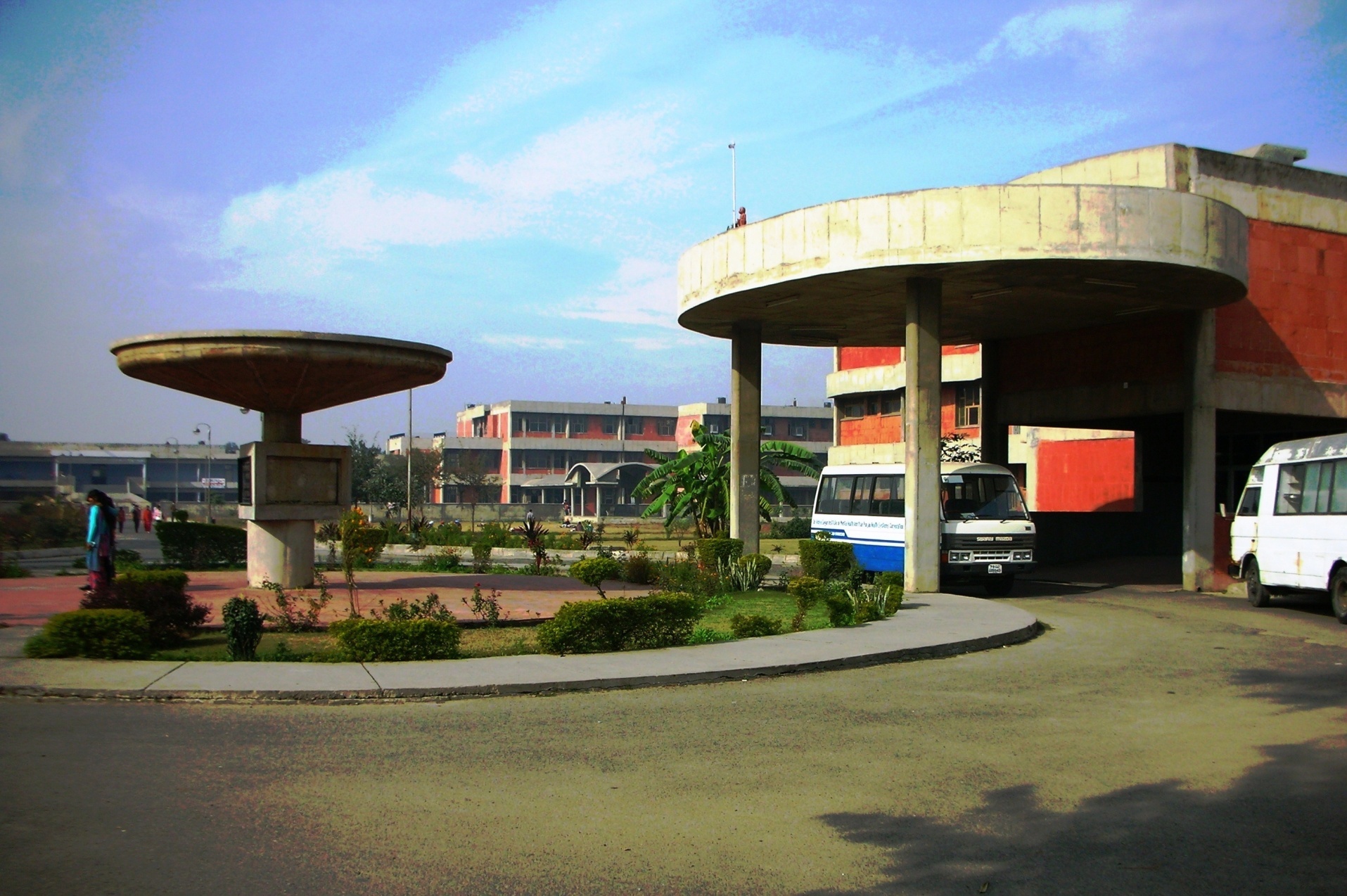
- Institute of Mental Health, Amritsar

Geography
- Location: Amritsar, Punjab, India

Organisation
- Care system: Public
- Type: Speciality
- Affiliated university: Punjab Health Systems Corporation

Services
- Emergency department: yes
- Beds: 450

History
- Founded: 1900

Links
- Website: imhamritsar.org

Institute of Mental Health, Amritsar also known as Dr. Vidyasagar Government Mental Hospital is public mental health institution and hospital run by Government of Punjab, located at circular road, Amritsar, Punjab. It serves the mental health patients from Punjab, Haryana, Himachal Pradesh and other neighboring states. Dr Savinder Singh is current in-charge of the Dr. Vidya Sagar Institute of Mental Health.

== History ==
Established originally at Lahore in 1900, shifted at Amritsar in 1947 after Partition of Punjab when non-Muslim patients were transferred here. Punjab police has duty of shifting mentally ill patients roaming on roads to the institute. In 2008, 100 acres of lawns land of hospital was transferred to Taj Swarna hotel in Trilium Mall.

== Shaheed Madan Lal Dhingra Memorial School of Nursing ==
School of Nursing at Dr. Vidyasagar Government Mental Hospital provides General Nursing and Midwifery (GNM) and BSc Nursing courses with hostel facilities.

== Notable people ==
- Dr. Vidya Sagar, in 1957, improved the hospital with some changes.
- Dr. B L Goel, Hospital Director in early 2000s

== See also ==
- Institute of Mental Health and Hospital, Agra
- Vidyasagar Institute of Mental Health and Neuro Sciences
