= M.Phil Clinical Psychology =

The M.Phil Clinical Psychology is a professional course and qualification in clinical psychology in some countries, including India. Elsewhere, other qualifications may be required or expected.

== By country ==
=== India ===
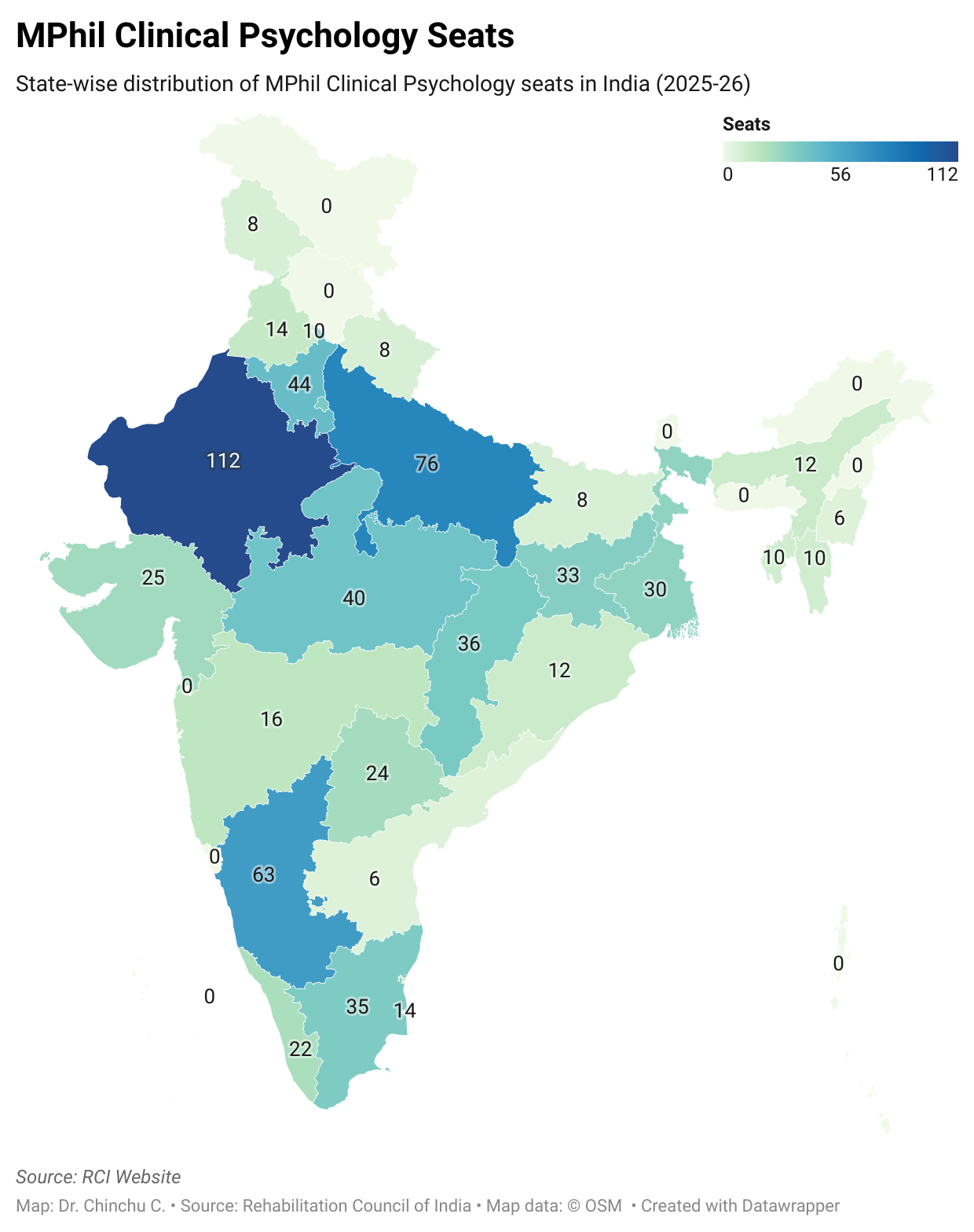
Distribution of M.Phil in Clinical Psychology training seats across recognized institutes in India for the academic year 2025-26.

in India offered by more than 50 organizations in India/ M.Phil Clinical Psychology is one of the popular courses to get a license of a Clinical Psychologist. M.Phil Clinical Psychology is a two-year hospital-based program. The old name of M.Phil in Clinical Psychology was Diploma in Medical and Social Psychology. MA/MSc in Psychology with 55% marks is the eligibility criteria for admission to this course. New Education Policy discontinued M.Phil program in India but M.Phil in Clinical Psychology is an exception, This course will be continued in Institutes and hospitals.
