= State Mental Health Institute =

Geography
- Location: Selaqui, Dehradun, Uttarakhand, India
- Coordinates: 30.364579°N 77.842012°E

Organisation
- Type: Specialist

Services
- Beds: 30
- Speciality: Psychiatric hospital

Links
- Lists: Hospitals in India

State Mental Health Institute is a psychiatric hospital based in Uttarakhand, India. It provides services to patients from Uttarakhand as well as adjoining states such as Uttar Pradesh and Himachal Pradesh. The hospital's outpatient arm treats more than 10,000 patients per year. There are 30 beds for inpatient psychiatric admissions. It is situated in Selaqui, a part of Dehradun, Uttarakhand at National highway 72 about 25 km from main city towards Paonta Sahib.

== Controversy and criticisms ==
=== Allegations of neglect of patients ===
In 2012, Gharwal Post reported that psychiatric patients were neglected by the hospital staff. The newspaper alleged that there was only one psychiatrist to attend to the thousands of out-patients as well as all the 30 in-patients who are admitted at a time. It also stated that this figure remained the unchanged for 4 years and the quality of care was further decreased due to the housing of involuntary patients who are usually uncooperative.

In 2013, Times of India journalist Tarun Vijay visited the hospital and wrote about the conditions in his blog. He reported that the hospital was in a dilapidated condition, under-staffed and most hospital equipments were non-functional.

This institute has two psychiatrists nowadays and two medical officers. Administration is supervised by chief medical superintendent. Both psychiatrists are having experience of over ten years in their field. Institute has already proposed to increase its bed strength to 100.
