= Tagore Theatre =

Coordinates: 30°43′59″N 76°47′22″E

Tagore Theatre, Chandigarh is a center for cultural performances located in Sector 18, Chandigarh. It was designed by architect Aditya Prakash, who was part of Chandigarh Capital Project Team, headed by Le Corbusier. Aditya Prakash was the principal of Chandigarh College of Architecture. Aditya Prakash has also designed a few residences in the city, one of which is in the same sector and is called Kailash Bhavan.

== History ==
Named after Rabindranath Tagore, India's Nobel laureate, Tagore Theatre, being the sole theatre in Chandigarh for a long time, had become an important hub of cultural activities for the citizens of Chandigarh. Now it has been converted into an auditorium.

== Design ==
Tagore theater with its blank brick walled cuboid structure, embodied the straight-line, had, over the years become an integral part of Chandigarh's Cityscape.
