= Prem Nath Thapar =

Indian civil servant (1903–1969)

Prem Nath Thapar CIE, ICS (13 April 1903– 1969) was a member of the Indian Civil Service in the Punjab region during India's transformation from a British colony to independent nation state.

== Career ==
Thapar joined the Indian Civil Service (ICS) in 1926 after graduating with a Bachelor of Arts from Oxford University. His first position was as Deputy Commissioner, Settlement Officer and Colonization Officer from 1926 to 1941. He was named Joint Secretary in the Department of Information and Broadcasting in 1941. He was appointed a Companion of the Order of the Indian Empire (CIE) in the 1944 Birthday Honours list, and was appointed Secretary of the Department of Food and Civil Supplies for the Punjab Government in 1946. In 1947 he was named the Commissioner of the Lahore and Jalandhar Divisions. With the allocation of Lahore to Pakistan in 1947, this position became moot and Thapar found himself overseeing the first planned city in India.

== Chandigarh ==
Thapar was chosen to serve as the administrative head of the Chandigarh Capital Project in 1949, at the very beginning of the projects conception. Thapar, working with P.L. Varma, chose the site for the new capital of Punjab via aircraft reconnaissance in the spring of 1948.

Thapar and Varma also led the selection of architects for the new city. Their initial proposal of architect to the Punjab government in December 1949 was Albert Mayer, an American town planner who teamed with Matthew Nowicki to plan the new city. The death of Nowicki in an August 1950 plane crash led Mayer to withdraw from the project and caused Thapar and Varma to go to Europe in search of a new architect in the fall of 1950.

Thapar and Varma agreed that the design of Chandigarh should represent a new, modern idiom of design, not beholden to Indian traditions but instead thoroughly modern. Thapar in particular was emphatic that they should find a good modern architect not bound by an established style. Budget constraints led them to confine their search for an architect to soft money areas of Europe.

On the recommendation of Maxwell Fry and Jane Drew, who were eventually hired to design housing for the city, they went to Paris to interview Le Corbusier in November 1950. Although Le Corbusier initially rejected their proposal, he sent them to visit the Masion d' Unite as an example of his work. Thapar's initial reaction to the design was negative, because the high-rise structure and reliance on elevators was incompatible with the typical Indian style of living. When Le Corbusier eventually accepted the project, Thapar ensured that the avoidance of high rise structures was part of Corbusier's design contract.

After he joined the project in 1950, Le Corbusier expressed his admiration for their choice of site. "I admire Thapar and Varma. They have seen the possibilities of the site. They are big men." Thapar's key concerns during the course of the project were money and liveability over architectural style, but his capable administration of the project generated a strong sense of respect from the architects working on the project. M.N. Sharma, one of the Indian architects on the project team, recalled that "P.N. Thapar was a remarkable coordinator and kept a hawk's eye on every aspect of the project." When Thapar was removed from the project in 1951, Maxwell Fry complained of a lack of "unity of administrative control," and Thapar was eventually returned to his position.

In addition to administering the project itself, he also oversaw the resettlement efforts for the 58 villages that were located on the chosen site. After the official completion of the project in 1953, he remained in Chandigarh as the Advisor to the Planning Commission until 1954.

== Later career ==
Thapar was named Secretary of the Ministry of Food and Agriculture from 1954 to 58, a position that would influence his later career. In 1958 he was named Secretary to the Ministry of Finance, where he remained until 1962.

In 1962 he was named the first Vice-Chancellor of the new Punjab Agricultural University and remained in that position until 1968, when he suffered a paralytic stroke. He is credited for gathering the group of scientists that ushered in the Green Revolution in Punjab in the 1960s. In his honour, the Dr. P.N. Thapar Gold Medal is awarded to the best all-around graduate of the university every year. He served on the Board of the International Rice Research Institute from 1964 to 1966, and as the president of the India Agricultural Universities Association from 1967 to 1969.

Thapar was awarded an honorary Doctorate from Ohio State University in March 1969. He was also a founding member of the India National Theater in Chandigarh, India.
