= Vidyasagar Institute of Mental Health and Neuro and Allied Sciences =

Coordinates: 28°34′9.4″N 77°15′3″E

Vidyasagar Institute of Mental Health, Neuro and Allied Sciences

Geography
- Location: No. 1, Institutional Area, Nehru Nagar, New Delhi, Delhi, India

History
- Founded: 1987

Links
- Website: vimhans.com
- Lists: Hospitals in India

Vidya Sagar Institute of Mental Health and Neuro and Allied Sciences (VIMHANS) is a mental healthcare institution in South Delhi. It was founded in 1987 as a tribute to the Indian psychiatrist Vidya Sagar.

== Healthcare functions ==
VIMHANS is a non-government institution that runs an in-patient facility for persons with mental illness. VIMHANS, also supports community outreach centres in Mehrauli, Delhi and Rohtak, Haryana. The hospital conducts free medical camps in various disciplines in various slums and villages in the National Capital Region.

== Controversy and criticism ==
=== North India’s first multiple sclerosis treatment centre at VIMHANS ===
New Delhi's first specialised multiple sclerosis (MS) treatment centre was inaugurated by the Delhi CM Sheila Dikshit at VIMHANS in the presence of the patients, caregivers and doctors. The MS center at VIMHANS would reportedly be North India's first dedicated MS-care centre where patients will get comprehensive management by a team of experts, including neurologists, psychologists, psychiatrists, physical and occupational therapists, urologists, and radiologists, all under the same roof.

=== Absence of Free Treatment for Poor Patients ===
In 2001, Times of India reported that VIMHANS was in violation with an agreement by the Delhi Government. The agreement stipulated that the hospital has to provide free treatment to 70 percent of its admitted patients. VIMHANS ignored this stipulation, and then stated it would provide free treatment to 40 percent of its admitted patients. The latter promise was neither followed through by the trust operating the hospital.

=== Medical Negligence of Female Patient ===
In 2005, VIMHANS treated a 43-year-old female patient. The patient suffered a partial paralysis and was admitted to the hospital. During the treatment, the hospital staff mistakenly administered a high dose of steroids into the right arm of the patient. The arm immediately began swelling, the doctors advised that it was not dangerous. Eventually, the arm had to be amputated. She was transferred to AIIMS.

=== Treatment of Gitanjali Nagpal ===
In 2007, under a court order, VIMHANS provided treatment to a well known model named Gitanjali Nagpal.

=== Treatment of Syd Kid (assumed name) ===
In 2016, for medical detoxification and supervision, S. Kid checked in voluntarily but, was delayed 48 hours as the beds were unavailable. The patient then, checked in 48 hours later. By that time, the withdrawal symptoms were gone, but he was still taken to the hospital and stays there till date despite the symptoms going away before admission. The patient stays there till date as advised by the doctor.
