= South Scope =

Indian monthly English language film magazine

- Cover of the special edition issued on its fourth anniversary featuring actress Kajal Aggarwal.
- Frequency: Monthly
- Founded: 2009
- Company: Silver Scope Media & Entertainment Pvt. Ltd.
- Country: India
- Based in: Hyderabad, Chennai
- Language: English
- Website: www.southscope.in

South Scope is an Indian based, monthly, English-language film magazine which focuses on South Indian films, film personalities and the industry.

== History ==
South Scope was established in 2009. Allu Sirish is the founder and advisor. Managing editor is Aruna R Krishnan, also senior editor and publisher of Ritz, a lifestyle magazine.

The magazine is based in Chennai and is published on a monthly basis.

== Distribution ==
South Scope is available on Indian news stands and in foreign markets - United States, Malaysia, Far East, Middle East and Europe. The magazine has 6 lacs (600,000) readers and its digital editions reach more than 10 countries worldwide.

== Features ==
South Scope features reports on current film productions, reports on film industry parties, events attended by stars, and industry news, covering Telugu, Tamil, Malayalam and Kannada film industries.

It includes articles and interviews with industry personalities, as well as reports on film making techniques and editorial features.

== Lifestyle awards ==
SouthScope Lifestyle Awards are presented annually to people with notable achievements in the field of business, media etc.
