= Chandigarh College of Architecture =

Architectural school in Chandigarh, India

Coordinates: 30°45′56″N 76°47′01″E

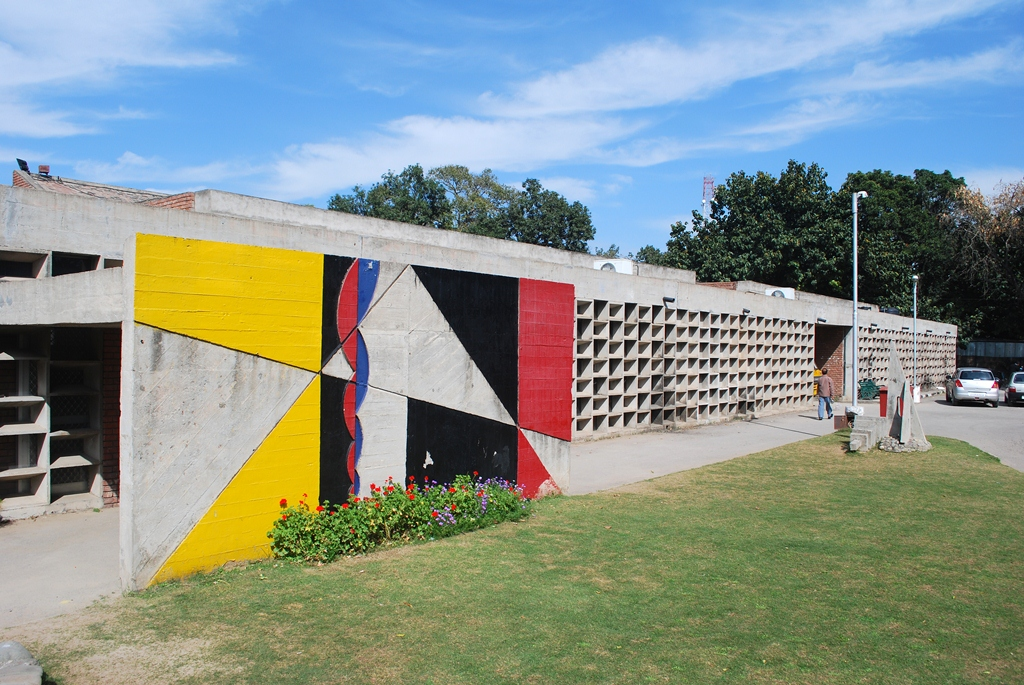
- Other name: CCA
- Type: Architecture College
- Established: 1961; 65 years ago
- Academic affiliations: Panjab University
- Principal: Sangeeta Bagga Mehta
- Location: Sector 12, Chandigarh, India
- Website: cca.edu.in
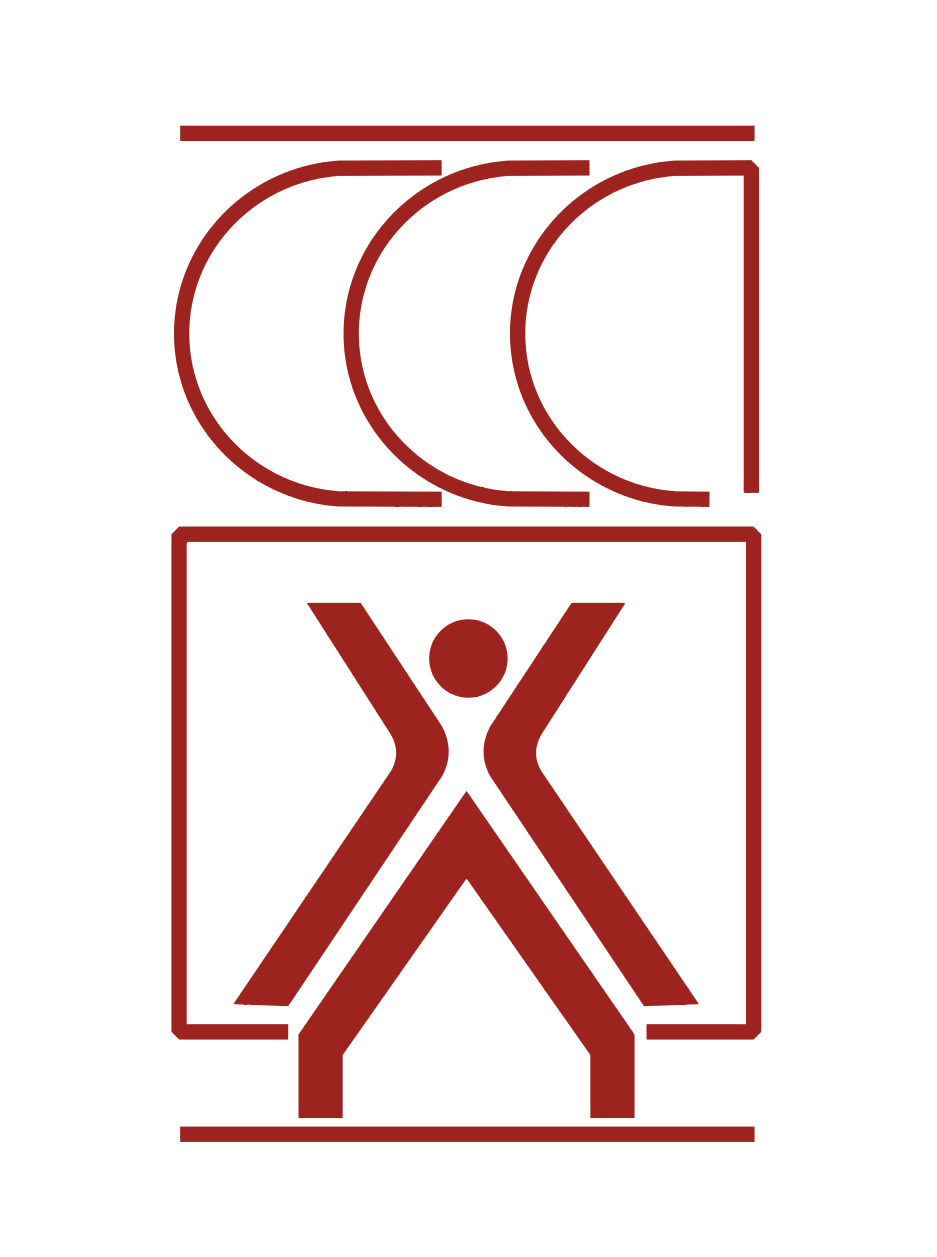

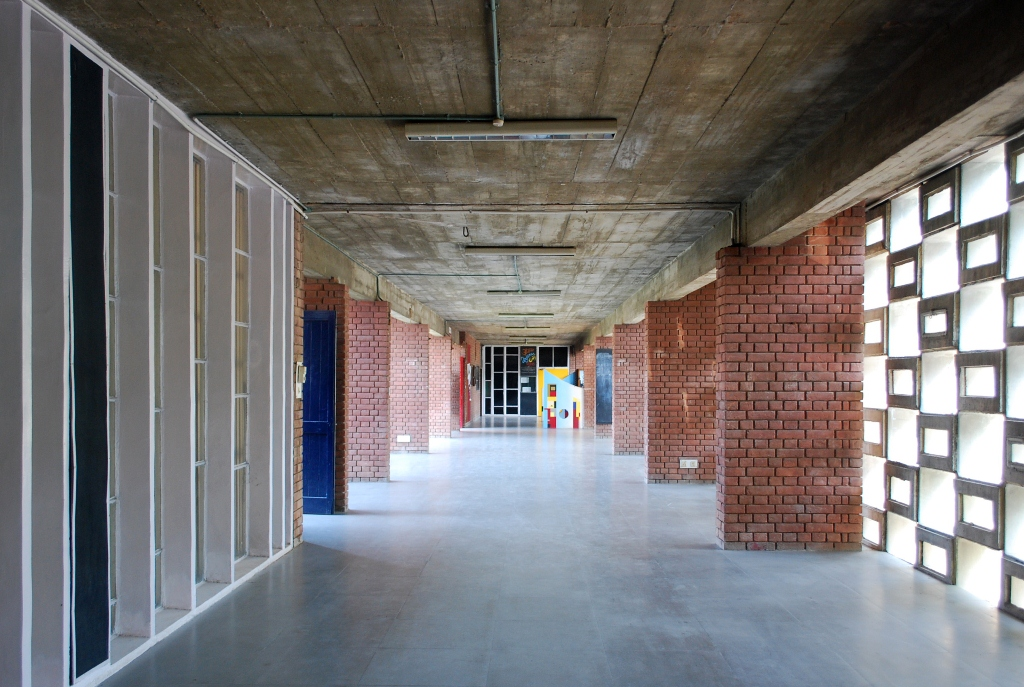
Entrance foyer

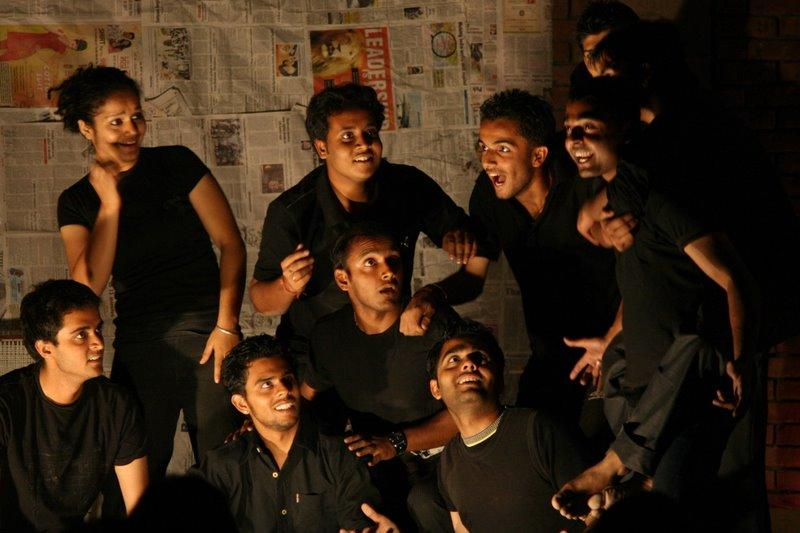
Students enacting a play during the annual fest "Archo"

The Chandigarh College of Architecture (CCA) is a college imparting education and research in the field of architecture. It covers the north-western region of India including the states of Punjab, Haryana, and Himachal Pradesh as well as the Union Territories of Chandigarh and Jammu and Kashmir.

== History ==
Chandigarh College of Architecture was established on 7 August 1961 in Chandigarh, India, and was set up to impart education in architecture. Le Corbusier, who developed Chandigarh's master plan in 1951, got CCA established as a part of the Chandigarh Experiment.

== Courses ==
The college offers a five-year program leading to the degree of Bachelor of Architecture (BArch) for which it is affiliated to the Panjab University in the Faculty of Design and Fine Arts. A semester system has been in place since 1972. A two-tier scheme has been in effect from 1985. The 10 semester course is offered in two tiers: Stage One, from first to sixth semester or three years and Stage Two, from seventh to tenth semester or two years. Stage One consists of theoretical subjects, tutorials, workshop practice and studio work for a basic grounding in the knowledge about architecture and its tools and skills. Stage Two comprises a six-month practical training followed by a large number of elective courses and studies of urban design, professional practice, town-planning and a thesis. In 1998, the program was modified to introduce more interdisciplinary courses and upcoming themes like building automation and sustainable design.

== Campus ==
The campus is housed inside the PEC University of Technology (formerly Punjab Engineering College) Campus in Sector 12, Chandigarh. CCA is widely spread in 5-acre (20,000 m^{2}) campus with its own cricket ground, basketball court, volleyball court and a gym. The boys hostel is located 250 yards (230 m) behind the campus, near the PEC market and the girls hostel is located in Sector 11, Chandigarh.

== Annual events ==
"Corbu Day" is the annual founder's day which is celebrated on 6 October i.e. the birthdate of Le Corbusier. Guest lectures by eminent architects are held on this day. Awards and scholarships are awarded to meritorious students.

The annual college fest "Archo" is held in March. The event is an inter-house competition among four houses, namely Kanishka, Kalinga,losers and Ashoka. Students participate in cultural, sports and design contests over a period of two weeks.

In the year 2011, the college completed its 50 Years and the Golden Jubilee celebrations were carried out. 2011Pritzker Prize Laureate, Eduardo Souto de Moura, was the keynote speaker at the event.

== Rankings ==
CCA has been ranked 30th according to the National Institutional Ranking Framework (NIRF) rankings in Architecture Category in the year 2024.

University rankings

Architecture – India
- NIRF (2024): 30

== Notable alumni ==
- Baburam Bhattarai – 36th Prime Minister of Nepal.
- Rajesh Kumar Kaushal – Special Director General, Central Public Works Department, MoHUA, Govt. of India.
