= Anukokunda Oka Roju =

2005 film by Chandra Sekhar Yeleti

- Film poster
- Directed by: Chandra Sekhar Yeleti
- Written by: Chandra Sekhar Yeleti (Story & screenplay); Gunnam Gangaraju (dialogues)
- Produced by: Gunnam Gangaraju; Venkat Dega
- Starring: Charmy; Jagapathi Babu; Shashank
- Cinematography: Sarvesh Murari
- Edited by: Mohan; Rama Rao; Chandra Shekar G. V.
- Music by: M. M. Keeravani
- Production company: Just Yellow Media
- Release date: 30 June 2005
- Running time: 145 minutes
- Country: India
- Language: Telugu
- Budget: ₹2.9 crore

Anukokunda Oka Roju (transl. Unexpectedly, one day) is a 2005 Indian Telugu-language mystery thriller film written and directed by Chandra Sekhar Yeleti. Produced by Gunnam Gangaraju and Venkat Dega under the Just Yellow banner, the film stars Charmy, Jagapathi Babu, and Shashank, with music composed by M. M. Keeravani.

The story follows Sahasra, a woman who cannot recall anything from an entire day in her life and becomes involved in a dangerous situation as she attempts to uncover what happened on that day. The film explores themes of drug-induced memory loss, psychological manipulation, and the dangers of cults and godmen.

Anukokunda Oka Roju was critically acclaimed for its unique narrative, direction, and cast performances. The film won multiple accolades, including two Nandi Awards for Second Best Feature Film and Best Screenplay Writer, as well as a Filmfare Award South, and a Santosham Film Award. It was later remade as Sunday (2008) in Hindi.

== Plot ==
The film begins with a group of people following a young boy returning from school, who is revealed to be ex-inspector Suresh Reddy. He and his colleagues apprehend a drug smuggler, but Suresh later accepts a bribe from him. Meanwhile, Sahasra, a chorus singer, struggles to establish herself in playback singing. One night, she attends a rave party at the insistence of her party-loving friend Swetha. The next day, Sahasra goes about her usual routine, but she is unaware that an entire day has been erased from her memory, and she cannot recall what transpired during that time.

Sahasra only becomes aware that something is wrong when, a few days later, she is pursued by unidentified men attempting to assassinate her. During this time, she meets Rajesh, a cab driver, who tells her that she needs to return money to him, and later encounters Suresh, who reveals that he is familiar with her and her family. Suresh explains that her family had sent him a marriage proposal, but it was later rejected.

Sahasra begins hearing strange things on her audio recorder that she does not remember saying, and she experiences unsettling dreams. She is attacked multiple times: first at a theatre while going to watch Shankar Dada M.B.B.S. with children from her flat, then near a clinic, a shop, and finally at Rajesh's house by his brother. She also discovers a peculiar symbol during her encounters. Throughout these events, Suresh helps Sahasra as much as he can.

Eventually, the mystery of the symbol is unraveled through a flashback to 1997, when Suresh was still an inspector. During this time, he encounters Surya Swami, a former teacher who is seen burning chits with the intention of calling a god to earth. After observing Surya Swami's actions, Suresh concludes that he is mentally unstable. Suresh physically confronts him and has him committed to an asylum.

It is later revealed that on the night when Sahasra became intoxicated, she unknowingly stumbled upon Surya Swami’s secret ashram and inadvertently disturbed his rituals. Enraged by this disruption, Surya Swami orders his deranged disciples to kill her as punishment for interfering with their practices, as he is preparing for a suicide ritual intended to summon god to earth.

A man named Bojo, who had previously intoxicated Sahasra, was traveling in another car when he was killed while attempting to save her. Eventually, Sahasra is abducted by Surya Swami's followers and is about to be killed. However, she is rescued by Machavarapu Abbulu, a theatre actor who had witnessed Sahasra traveling in Rajesh's car. Under Suresh’s guidance, Abbulu is positioned as a messenger from God. He delivers a message to Surya Swami, telling him to abandon his asram and disciples and meditate peacefully. The message further warns Surya Swami not to harm Sahasra, as she is a goddess who came to observe his practices. In response, Surya Swami orders his followers to dismantle the asram and retreat. The asylum staff subsequently arrives and takes Surya Swami into their custody.

The film concludes with Suresh revealing to Sahasra that on the night of the missing day, an elderly man had found her, disoriented and dizzy in the street after a visit to the medical shop. The man took her back to her apartment, where she later slept for the whole day, solving the mystery of the missing day.

== Cast ==
- Charmy as Sahasra (voice dubbed by Sunitha)
- Jagapati Babu as Inspector Suresh Reddy
- Shashank as Rajesh, a taxi driver
- Pavan Malhotra as Surya Swamy, a madman who believes he is a messenger of god
- Harsha Vardhan as Shankar Rao M.A., B.Ed., a tuition teacher
- Narsing Yadav as Machavarapu Abbulu
- Amit Tiwari as Bhaskar "Bojo"
- Kaushal Manda as Bojo's friend
- Sivannarayana Naripeddi as Sahasra's father
- Ravi Prakash as Mahesh
- Vasu Inturi as Rajesh's brother
- Kamal Kamaraju as Kamal, Surya Swamy's follower
- Pooja Bharti as Swetha, Sahasra's friend
- Surya
- C. V. L. Narasimha Rao
- Shanoor Sana as Doctor
- Baby Annie as a tuition student
- Giridhar
- Viswa Mohan
- Gopi Kaasi Reddy
- Sravan
- Srinivas
- Praveen
- Bhagawaan
- Dhulipala Nagendra
- Satish Bathula
- Srikanth
- Sivam
- Jagga Rao
- Sandra
- Jayalakshmi
- Baby Rupika

== Production ==
=== Development ===
After the success of Aithe (2003), Chandra Sekhar Yeleti worked on several projects that were eventually shelved. He then shifted his focus to a heroine-oriented thriller, Anukokunda Oka Roju. Initially, Pratyusha Creations was to produce the film, but they withdrew from the project, feeling that debuting with a thriller would be too risky. Yeleti then approached Gunnam Gangaraju, who agreed to produce the film without any changes to the script. This collaboration led to the production of Anukokunda Oka Roju and Yeleti worked on the pre-production for over two months.

Yeleti developed the story based on real-life observations. The idea originated from noticing how alcohol caused erratic behaviour and memory loss, prompting him to explore the more severe effects of drugs. This concept became the foundation of the film’s narrative, which focuses on a young woman’s experiences after being unknowingly drugged.

Initially, Yeleti intended to focus on drug mafias, but his encounters with godmen (swamis) shifted his focus to cult behaviour. He observed some real-life swamis exploiting followers for financial gain or performing bizarre acts that their devotees perceived as miracles. Incidents such as offering drainage water as a holy drink and public displays of eccentric behavior inspired him. His research included the book World Famous Cults and Fanatics and historical events like the mass suicide of over 900 individuals in a Western cult. These influences shaped the film’s climax, which incorporated elements of cult dynamics.

Yeleti connected drug addiction and cult behavior, highlighting their psychological effects. While drug use impacts individuals, he considered cults more dangerous due to their ability to manipulate and control followers. By combining these themes, he created the storyline of Anukokunda Oka Roju, with its climax emphasizing the sinister aspects of cult practices.

The film depicted drug use realistically, which was uncommon in Telugu cinema at the time. Researching drugs proved challenging, as users were reluctant to provide details. The team gathered authentic information on the availability, appearance, and effects of substances, and then created duplicates for filming. The drugs portrayed in the film include Ecstasy tablets, Rohypnol (commonly referred to as a date rape drug), and Cocaine. Cocaine was depicted as being distributed in packets marked with a scorpion symbol.

=== Casting ===
For the lead role of Sahasra, Chandra Sekhar Yeleti initially approached Genelia, who liked the story but was unavailable due to scheduling conflicts. The team then considered Bhumika, but she did not show interest. After an unsuccessful search for a new face, Yeleti cast Charmy after seeing her on a television program and being impressed by her Telugu-speaking skills. Producer Gangaraju also highlighted that Charmy’s natural appearance, without makeup, made her an ideal fit for the role. In contrast to her previous energetic and hyperactive roles, Charmy portrayed a simple character with minimal makeup and costumes. In preparation for the role, she studied the expressions of middle-class girls to better understand her character.

Jagapathi Babu was cast as a suspended police officer, portraying an older, unmarried character. Initially, the role was offered to Rajeev Kanakala, but during discussions for another project, Chandra Sekhar Yeleti narrated the story of Anukokunda Oka Roju to Jagapathi Babu. Jagapathi Babu was drawn to the role of the suspended cop and expressed a strong desire to play it. To avoid typical police officer stereotypes, Yeleti reworked the character and gave him a Real juice pack instead of the usual cigarettes or alcohol. Jagapathi Babu's involvement added commercial appeal to the film.

Shashank was Yeleti's first choice for the role of the cab driver, based on his earlier performances in Aithe (2003) and Sye (2004). To prepare for the role, Shashank observed cab drivers in Hyderabad. The character's look was designed by Yeleti. Shashank focused on imagining how a student-cabbie would behave and brought spontaneity to his performance.

Narsing Yadav, typically known for rowdy roles, was cast in a more subdued character. Harsha Vardhan joined the cast after Lakshmipati, the original choice for the tuition teacher role, left due to scheduling conflicts. Harsha Vardhan was initially assigned to the role later played by Ravi Prakash.

=== Filming ===
Principal photography for Anukokunda Oka Roju began on 20 November 2004. Chandra Sekhar Yeleti prioritised authenticity in both locations and ambiance, avoiding traditional studio sets and frequently used outdoor sites. The team opted for real locations that suited the story, with a few scenes filmed at Ramanaidu Studios as required by the narrative. Most scenes were shot in public places to capture the environment’s authenticity, following a location-based shooting schedule. The climax was filmed first, while the heroine’s introduction was completed towards the end of production. The film's production extended to 90 working days, surpassing the planned 70 days. Night shoots were delayed as the team underestimated Hyderabad's nightlife, leaving only an hour of clear roads between 2 am and 3 am each night for filming.

The film marked the debut of Sarvesh Murari as a cinematographer, who had previously worked as an associate to cinematographers Rasool Ellore and K. K. Senthil Kumar. Murari utilized techniques such as applying filters to achieve a chocolate tint and employing the skip bleach technique for the "Needalle" song, which added a unique visual style. He also used handheld cameras for specific shots and incorporated direct sunlight in some scenes to align with the film’s narrative and aesthetic. The total exposure used for the film was 115,000 feet, with the director's cut consisting of 15,000 feet. The final version of the film was edited down to 13,000 feet.

=== Post-production ===
Post-production for Anukokunda Oka Roju took about two and a half months. Sunitha completed her dubbing for Charmy in just four days. The team aimed for unique and authentic voices, so they hired real software engineers for background voices in certain scenes instead of using regular dubbing artists. This approach required more time and resources but helped maintain a fresh sound for the film.

== Music ==
Anukokunda Oka Roju

Film score by M.M. Keeravani
- Released: 31 May 2005
- Genre: Soundtrack
- Length: 21:48
- Label: Aditya Music
- Producer: M.M. Keeravani

M.M. Keeravani chronology
Paheli (2005)	Anukokunda Oka Roju (2005)	Kasak (2005)

The music for Anukokunda Oka Roju was composed by M. M. Keeravani, with the soundtrack released under the Aditya Music label. The album consists of five songs and one chorus track, all written from the perspective of the heroine, featuring only female playback singers. Shreya Ghoshal and Sunidhi Chauhan each sang two songs, while pop singer Smita performed one track. Keeravani and producer Gunnam Gangaraju wrote the lyrics for most of the songs, with "Evaraina Choosuntara" penned by Sirivennela Sitarama Sastry. Smita won the Filmfare Award for Best Female Playback Singer - Telugu for her performance of "Evaraina Choosuntara".

The audio soundtrack was released on 31 May 2005 at an event held at Music World in Banjara Hills, featuring a magic show. Baby Kavya, known for Little Soldiers (1996), released the audio at the event.

No.	Title	Lyrics	Singer(s)	Length
1.	"Evaraina Chusuntara"	Sirivennela Sitarama Sastry	Smita	3:18
2.	"I Wanna Sing"	M.M. Keeravani, Ganga Raju, Maruth (English lyrics)	Sunidhi Chauhan, Dominique Cerejo	4:08
3.	"Humming"	Instrumental	Chorus	2:10
4.	"Shaina Na Na Na"	M.M. Keeravani, Ganga Raju	Sunidhi Chauhan	5:17
5.	"Needalle Tharumuthuvundi"	M.M. Keeravani, Ganga Raju	Shreya Ghoshal	4:06
6.	"Righto Lefto"	M.M. Keeravani, Ganga Raju	Shreya Ghoshal	2:49
Total length:				21:48

== Release ==
The film was released with 24 prints in Andhra Pradesh and two prints in the US. Producer Gangaraju mentioned in an interview that the film was made on a budget of ₹2.9 crore and that they incurred a loss of ₹90 lakh on the film.

== Reception ==
Jeevi of Idlebrain.com rated Anukokunda Oka Roju 3.5 out of 5, calling it "Anukunnatte Oka Manchi Cinema" (Expectedly, a good film). He praised its original story, realistic approach, direction, performances, and music, but mentioned the slow narration and weak climax as drawbacks. In a retrospective review, Amulya Nimmagadda of Film Companion praised Anukokunda Oka Roju for its storytelling, performances, and screenplay, highlighting its blend of mystery and social commentary on blind faith.

== Awards ==
The film has won the following awards:

Nandi Awards - 2005

- Second Best Feature Film - Silver - Gangaraju Gunnam
- Best Screenplay Writer - Chandra Sekhar Yeleti

Filmfare Awards

- Best Female Playback Singer - Telugu - Smita

Santosham Film Awards

- Best Actress - Charmy
