= Amrutham (TV series) =

Telugu TV sitcom by Gunnam Gangaraju

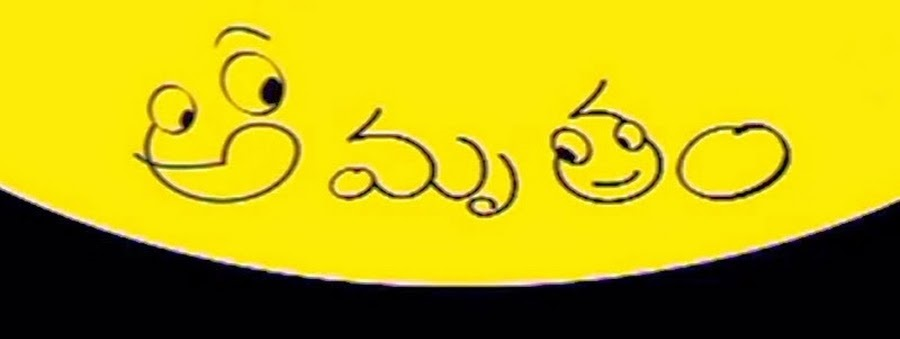
- Genre: Sitcom
- Created by: Gunnam Gangaraju
- Written by: Gunnam Gangaraju; Vasu Inturi
- Directed by: Chandra Sekhar Yeleti (1–14); S. S. Kanchi (15–44, 46–48, 51); Sivaji Raja (45, 49–50); Hari Charan (52–); Vasu Inturi; Sandeep Gunnam; Gopi Kasireddy
- Starring: Sivaji Raja (1–55); Naresh (63–105); Harsha Vardhan (110–313); Gundu Hanumantha Rao; Vasu Inturi; Sivannarayana; Ragini; Jhansi
- Theme music composer: Kalyani Malik
- Opening theme: Orey Anjaneyulu
- Composer: Kalyani Malik
- Country of origin: India
- Original language: Telugu
- No. of seasons: 1
- No. of episodes: 313

Production
- Executive producer: Urmila Gunnam
- Producers: Gangaraju Gunnam; Venkat Dega
- Production location: Hyderabad
- Cinematography: K. K. Senthil Kumar (13 episodes)
- Editors: Sudhakar; Chandrashekhar G. V.
- Camera setup: Multi-camera
- Running time: 21-26 minutes
- Production company: Just Yellow Media

Original release
- Network: Gemini TV
- Release: November 18, 2001 – November 18, 2007

Related
- Amrutham Chandamamalo; Amrutham Dhvitheeyam

Amrutham (lit. 'Elixir') is an Indian Telugu-language television sitcom created and produced by Gunnam Gangaraju. The show originally aired on Gemini TV from 18 November 2001 to 18 November 2007, running for six years with a total of 313 episodes. It is widely regarded as the greatest Telugu comedy TV series of all time. The show, known for its clean and family-friendly humour, satirised a wide range of topics, including soap operas, films, competitive exams, superstitions, game shows, and politics.

The show centers on four characters: Amrutha Rao and Anjaneyulu (Gundu Hanumantha Rao), childhood friends who own the Amrutha Vilas restaurant in Hyderabad; Sarvam (Vasu Inturi), a cook and server from Tamil Nadu who works for them; and their greedy landlord, Appaji (Sivannarayana), who frequently imposes unfair penalties. Amrutha Rao and Anjaneyulu often come up with quirky ideas to grow their business, but always end up failing in amusing ways. The role of Amrutha Rao was first played by Sivaji Raja, then Naresh, and ultimately by Harsha Vardhan, who appeared in over 200 of the show's 313 episodes.

Most episodes were written by Gunnam Gangaraju, along with Vasu Inturi, who also played the role of Sarvam. The show's title song was composed and sung by Kalyani Malik, with lyrics by Sirivennela Sitarama Sastry. Several notable film technicians, such as director Chandra Sekhar Yeleti, cinematographer K. K. Senthil Kumar, production designer S. Ravinder, and music composer Kalyani Malik worked on the show in the early stages of their careers.

Amrutham originally aired every Sunday at 8:30 PM on Gemini TV. In the early 2000s, it stood out as a refreshing sitcom amidst the dominance of melodramatic soap operas, earning praise as a "phenomenon" and becoming one of Telugu television's most successful shows. The series ended at its peak due to challenges with new ideas and writers but was re-telecast multiple times, maintaining high ratings. A spin-off film, Amrutham Chandamamalo, was released in 2014, and a sequel series, Amrutham Dhvitheeyam, streamed on ZEE5 from 2020 to 2021.

== Premise ==
The show revolves around two friends — Amrutha Rao "Amrutham" and Anjaneyulu "Anji" — who decide to start a restaurant named Amrutha Vilas, after Amrutham gets fired from his job as an assistant manager at Bow Bow Biscuits by his boss Ambhujanabham. Sarvam is the waiter at Amrutha Vilas and is a migrant from Tamil Nadu.

Appaji, the landlord of the plot of Amrutha Vilas and the residences of Amrutham and Anji, is a miser who subjects his tenants to unreasonable penalties. He wears colourful shirts and an ancestral gold belt. Amrutham's wife Sanjeevani is a gullible and ambitious woman. Anji's wife Santha works in the accounts section of a Government corporation and also helps him in his business occasionally. The sitcom focuses on the hilarious consequences they face from the quirky money-making ideas of Anji.

== Cast and characters ==
=== Main ===
- Ichapurapu Amrutha Rao "Amrutham" played by Sivaji Raja (episodes 1–55), Naresh (episodes 63–105), and Harsha Vardhan (episodes 110–313); proprietor of Amrutha Vilas restaurant which he started with his childhood friend Anjaneyulu. He is inquisitive, sceptical, and wary of Anji's money-making schemes. He used to work in Bow-Bow Biscuits before starting his own restaurant.
- Amudala Anjaneyulu "Anji" played by Gundu Hanumantha Rao; an expert chef, Amrutham's best friend, neighbour, and business-partner. He is a man full of ideas and often comes up with quirky plans to boost their business which fail with hilarious consequences each time.
- Sarveswaran "Sarvam" played by Vasu Inturi; all-in-one worker at Amrutha Vilas. He is the server, cook, cleaner, and delivery boy of the restaurant. He is a migrant from Tamil Nadu.
- Gongali Appaji played by Sivannarayana Naripeddi; an exploitative landlord who subjects his tenants to unreasonable fines and penalties. He regularly has all his meals at Amrutha Vilas, set up on his property. He has an atrocious dress sense and wears colourful shirts with an ancestral gold belt. He is the show's antagonist.
- Sanjeevani "Sanju" played by Jhansi, Uma Mahanthi, Supraja and Anita Chowdary; Amrutham's wife. She is a gullible and ambitious woman which makes her vulnerable to Anji's over-the-top ideas and prod her husband into adopting them.
- Santha played by Ragini; Anji's wife. She works in the accounts section of a Government corporation. She has her feet planted on the ground. She keeps throwing cold water on Anji and Amrutham's money-making schemes.

=== Recurring ===
- Rubber Balaji played by Raghava; Amrutham's cousin and a filmmaker known for the soap opera 'Veyi Pudakalu' and other TV shows.
- Uma Devi, played by Bhargavi and others. She is Appaji's daughter, and Sarvam's love interest.
- Ambhujanabham played by S. S. Kanchi; Amrutha Rao's boss and the manager of Bow-Bow Biscuits who was a main character in the earlier episodes. He frequently scolds Amrutham for his incompetence.
- Padmini "Paddu" played by Swathi; Amrutham's sister-in-law and Sanju's sister. She lives in her sister's house while finishing her graduation.
- Parandamayya played by Devadas Kanakala; Amrutham's father-in-law. He is the father of Sanju and Paddu.
- Jenny in various characters. He has portrayed characters like an astrologer, an MLA, Amrutham's uncle Bhimavaram Bullabbayi, and others.
- Srinivasa Reddy in various characters such as a thief and a husband of Sanjeevani's friend.
- Narsing Yadav as Ganesh Chaturthi chanda-taking (transl. donation) goon and police officer (episode 80–81).
- Rallapalli as a doctor.
- Pavala Syamala as Appaji's aunt.
- Ratnasagar as Amrutham's grandmother.
- Melkote played by Shankar Melkote; a student learning Telugu language.
- Rama Rajamouli in various characters. She played a newsreader in one episode, a homemaker in another one.

== Production ==
=== Development ===
Gunnam Gangaraju, along with his friend Venkat Dega, a doctor in Canterbury, UK, founded the company 'Just Yellow' which started off as an IT services firm and later ventured into TV and film production. Their first project under the 'Just Yellow' banner was Amrutham. Gangaraju was the creator of the show as well as the producer. There were reports that veteran film producers like D. Ramanaidu and K. S. Rama Rao cautioned Gangaraju against producing a TV show as it might not be financially viable. After filming seven episodes, they pitched the show to various TV channels and finally got a slot on Gemini TV.

=== Cast ===
The show was originally launched with Sivaji Raja as Amrutha Rao "Amrutham", Gundu Hanumantha Rao as Anjaneyulu "Anji", Sivannarayana as Appaji, Vasu Inturi as Sarvam in the lead roles. Besides Sivaji Raja, Naresh also played the character Amrutha Rao for a few episodes before Harsha Vardhan took over and played the character in over 200 episodes out of the total 313 episodes. Ragini played Santha (Anjaneyulu's wife), while Jhansi, Uma Mahanthi, Anita Chowdary, and Supraja played Sanjeevani aka "Sanju" (Amrutham's wife) at various points.

Sivaji Raja, who initially portrayed the lead character Amrutha Rao, had a major fallout with the show's creators. Gunnam Gangaraju publicly criticized him as "a sick and greedy man," accusing Raja of unprofessional behaviour and tantrums. Sivaji Raja filed a complaint with the 'Association of Telugu TV Artistes,' claiming he wasn't adequately paid. As a result, the association banned other actors from participating in Amrutham. The show continued without the characters Amrutha Rao and his wife for four months, until the ban was lifted. Sivaji Raja was then replaced by Naresh, with whom the production ran smoothly. However, due to budget cuts following Gemini TV's tariff hike, Naresh was eventually replaced by Harsha Vardhan.

Gundu Hanumantha Rao who played 'Anji' had to reportedly leave nearly 30 film offers to continue working on Amrutham. After Hanumantha Rao's death in 2018, noted comedian L. B. Sriram played the role of Anji in the sequel, Amrutham Dhvitheeyam.

Costumer designer and stylist Rama Rajamouli, cousin of the show creator and producer Gunnam Gangaraju, played various small roles in the initial episodes of the show. She played a newsreader in one episode, a homemaker in another one.

=== Crew ===
Chandra Sekhar Yeleti, who is also Gangaraju's cousin, directed the first 10 episodes. The serial had eleven debutant directors the most notable among them being Chandra Sekhar Yeleti. Director Chandra Sekhar Yeleti, cinematographer K. K. Senthil Kumar, production designer S. Ravinder, and music composer Kalyani Malik who would later become established film technicians worked in Amrutham in the beginning phase of their career. Senthil worked as a cinematographer for 13 episodes. Comedian Satya worked as an assistant director.

=== Writing ===
We had dearth of story writers for Amrutham. Most of the content is written by me and Vasu (Sarvam in Amrutham). At that time writers used to be paid ₹5,000 per episode. I gave a full page advertisement in Swathi weekly with a promise of paying ₹25,000 per episode for new writers. But we didn’t get any satisfactory response. I have burnt out as a writer for Amrutham serial and stopped it.

— Gunnam Gangaraju on the reason for the cancellation of Amrutham

Gunnam Gangaraju, the creator and producer of the show, wrote most of the episodes along with Vasu Inturi who also played the role of Sarvam. The show only had a few lead characters — Amrutham, Anji, Sarvam, and Appaji with the rest of the characters having occasional appearances, as the creator Gangaraju could not write a larger number of characters.

Amrutham is especially noted for its clean, family-friendly humour and its satirical takes on everyday issues. The topics of satire are pretty diverse — soap operas, popular films, competitive exams, superstitions, game shows, contemporary politics, current affairs etc.

Gangaraju mentioned that there was a dearth of writers for the show. As he was burnt out as a writer, he advertised for new writers with a remuneration that is five times the industry standard at the time. As the response for new writers was not satisfactory and the original writers were exhausted of ideas, the show had to be cancelled even though it was at its peak in the weekly ratings.

== Music ==
The title track is composed and sung by Kalyani Malik. The lyrics were penned by Sirivennela Sitarama Sastry. Neeshita Nyayapati of Times of India noted in 2017, "The title song, sung by Kalyani Malik, is still one of the most iconic title songs that Telugu television has ever created."

Telugu (Original Sound Track)
No.	Title	Lyrics	Music	Singer(s)	Length
1.	"Title Track" (Orey Anjaneyulu)	Sirivennela Seetharama Sastry	Kalyani Malik	Kalyani Malik	2:19
Total length:					2:19

== Episodes ==
Episode no.	Title	Directed by	Written by	Original air date
1	"Go Gruha Pravesam" - Amrutham and Anji inaugurate their new house.	Chandra Sekhar Yeleti		Nov 18, 2001
2	"Hello My Dear Wrong Number" - Anji gets a new phone	Chandra Sekhar Yeleti		Nov 25, 2001
3	"Bow Sagaram" - This episode deals with Amrutham and his boss Ambujanabham when a group of tax collectors comes to investigate their office.	Chandra Sekhar Yeleti		Dec 2, 2001
4	"Inda...Govinda" - Anji discovers a new company that gives double the amount a person pays for exchange.	Chandra Sekhar Yeleti		Dec 9, 2001
5	"Naruda Vanaruda" - A wild man-ape is known to be roaming around the streets of Amrutham's house.	Chandra Sekhar Yeleti		Dec 16, 2001
6	"Vaidhyo Narayano Hari" - Amrutham gets a serious stomach ache.	Chandra Sekhar Yeleti		Dec 23, 2001
7	"Prakruthi-Vikruthi" - This episode introduces Ambaji, the brother of Appaji.	Chandra Sekhar Yeleti		Dec 30, 2001
8	"Caru Guddhina Kapuram" - Amrutham buys a second-hand car	Chandra Sekhar Yeleti		Jan 6, 2002
9	"Muggu Gumma" - Anji takes part in a Muggu (Rangoli) competition.	Chandra Sekhar Yeleti		Jan 13, 2002
10	"Vasthu Sistu" - Amrutham and Anji contact a layout specialist.	Chandra Sekhar Yeleti		Jan 20, 2002
11	"Intiki Lighter Intayane" - Amrutham does housework.	Chandra Sekhar Yeleti	Kanchi, Gagnga Raju	Jan 27, 2002
12	"Muduru Manasulu" - A neighbour's daughter visits Amrutham's house.	Chandra Sekhar Yeleti	Kanchi, Gagnga Raju	Feb 3, 2002
13	"Kakastram" - Amrutham tries to convince his boss for a promotion	Chandra Sekhar Yeleti	Kanchi, Gagnga Raju	Feb 10, 2002
14	"TV TV Tivvadam" - Sanjeevini goes crazy after watching TV 24 hours a day.	Chandra Sekhar Yeleti	Kanchi, Gagnga Raju	Feb 17, 2002
15	"Kalyana Veena"	S. S. Kanchi	Kanchi, Gagnga Raju	Feb 24, 2002
16	"Ugraveena"	S. S. Kanchi	Kanchi, Gagnga Raju	Mar 3, 2002
17	"Kudi Edamaithey"			Mar 10, 2002
18	"Prakruthi Vaidya Lila"			Mar 17, 2002
19	"Rangu Bangam"			Mar 24, 2002
20	"April 1 Vidudala Aagipoyindi"			Apr 1, 2002
21	"Leakabishekam"			Apr 8, 2002
22	"Astahyagraham"			
23	"Vrudda Ramayanam"			
24	"Paropakari Papamanna"			
25	"Nidaname Pramadamu"			
26	"Peka Medalu"			
27	"Auto Eto" - Amrutham busy a auto and becomes Auto Amruth			
28	"Neti Kukkaley Repati Pourulu"			
29	"Gudachari111111116" - Amrutham and Anji become detectives.			
30	"Samara Cut"			
31	"Mathi Poyina Chota Doorukuthundhi"			
32	"Aam Set"			
33	"Oka Debbaku Rendu Gorrelu"			
34	"Amrutha Kalaash"			
35	"Kadupe Noppi"			
36	"Avesam Amrutam Amudam"			
37	"Shokokadidi – Shockokadidi"			
38	"Paluke Bangara Maye Le"			
39	"Ammo Mummy"			
40	"Koy Raja Koy"			
41	"Server Sindhuram"			
42	"Action 500 Cut 50,000"			
43	"Ammayiki Sannajaji Mamaku Sampangi"			
44	"Chavithi Chandamama"			
45	"Hotale Kada Swargasima"			
46	"Dhina Dhina Asruvulu Noorella Asuvulu" Part 1- Amrutham and Anji's childhood friend Rubber Balaji came up with a new idea to make a serial 'Veyyi Pudakalu'. Santha and a few other actors act in the serial. Anji and Amrutham start watching the serial. While they watch the serial, Paddu goes to village and comes back after two weeks. They don't even realize the time. They get shocked. And the episode continues ...			
47	"Dhina Dhina Asruvulu Noorella Asuvulu" Part 2 - The serial was too contrived and they think it will be a failure. So they decide to not get involved in a partnership with Balaji. The next day morning Anji and Amrutham see everything around them was filled with floods. Rubber Balaji comes in a helicopter, gives them food, and says his serial 'Veyyi Pudakalu' became a super hit and the floods are tears from the audience and Balaji got ₹2 crore profit.			
48	"Power Cup" - Amrutham has a bet with the Electricity board. Amrutham gets an electricity bill of around ₹56,000 because the meter has gone wrong. Anji scolds the division manager. So the division manager bets Amrutham's team to win so that they will change the meter, otherwise, Amrutham has to pay double the amount of the electricity meter reading.	Sivaji Raja		
49	"Power Cup" Part 2 - Spoof on Lagaan - Amrutham forms the team and takes training. They all became ill and exhausted. They learn that the electricity team has three Ranji players. All of them pray to God for rain so that the match will be canceled. The next morning it rains all over the city except on the ground. Amrutham's team is all out except for Amrutham and EAMCET Rambabu on 17 for a total score of 22/9.	Sivaji Raja		
50	"Power Cup" Part 3 - Amrutham and co. finish the match. Everyone underestimated Rambabu, but he plays well so that Amrutham's team ends on 99. The electricity team starts batting and plays well. In the end, when 22 runs were needed off 6 balls, Anji bowls the last over and Amrutham's team loses. Now Amrutham has to pay six times the meter reading because Anji bets during the match with the division manager. When they all come to see the meter reading, the meter is broken when it is hit during the last ball by the division manager. So it is a zero reading and they need not pay the bill. Also, the electricity team needs to repair the meter board. So, Amrutham and co. are happy with a no loss.	Sivaji Raja		
51	"Dupavali" - Anji and co. manufacture Deepavali fireworks.- Amrutham and Anji come up with a new idea to make firecrackers for Deepavali.	S. S. Kanchi		
52	"Amma! Anakondamma" - Amrutham and Co. believe in snake myths	Hari Charan		
53	"Amrutha Abhayam" - Amrutham organizes a league to protect common people from thieves			
54	"Kalisi Unte Kaladu Sukam / Dukkam" Part 1 - Amrutham searches for a doll			
55	"Kalisi Unte Kaladu Sukam / Dukkam" Part 2 - Amrutham buys the doll			
56	"Adrushtam Notlo Sani" - Ambujanbham gets a chance to visit US			
57	"TV lo Dukanam" - Anji and Co. star in a TV ad			
58	"Veera Boss" - Ambujanabham tries to reform Amrutha Vilas			
59	"Balle Titanic Lithe"			
60	"Ayomaya Sabha"			
61	"Jalabhoomi Edupovidatha" - Ambujanabham tries to arrange a swimming pool.			
62	"Piss Vasam"			
63	"Vareva Emi Face" - Amrutham returns.			
64	"Hotel Kante Gudi Padilam" - A bomb blast occurs			
65	"Muhurta Balam" - Amrutham and Co. reopen Amrutha Vilas			
66	"Balentine" - Amrutham and Anji celebrate Valentine's Day.			
67	"Panchatarem" Part 1 - Five dupes of famous actors star in Amrutha Vilas			
68	"Panchatarem" Part 2 - The five actors move on.			
69	"World Cup" - Amrutham and Anji follow cricket			
70	"Cricket Ienamaha" - Amrutham and Anji conduct poojas			
71	"Amo March 23" - Amrutham and Co. revisit earlier times			
72	"Pachadaina Ugadi" - Amrutham and Anji attempt to celebrate Ugadi.			
73	"Em Cet" - Amrutham and Ambujanabham prepare for an exam.			
74	"Chetiki Panti Noppi"			
75	"Akala Chakram" - Ambujanabham is ridiculed by teenagers.			
76	"Cell To Cell" - Appaji sells cellphones			
77	"Rasam Pindina Lorry" - Amrutham imports mangoes.			
78	"Pappu Chesina Appu Card" - Ambujanabham utilizes Credit Card.			
79	"Ithe Avvakapothe" - Amrutham and Co. are up to secret business			
80	"Ithe Avvakapothe" Part 2 - Amrutham and Co. kidnap the wrong person.			
81	"Botunu Munchina Anchor" - Amrutham stars in a TV show.			
82	"China Tirigi Dannam Pettu"			
83	"Rajanela" - Anji buys a piece of land.			
84	"Amrutha Ganga" - Amrutha Vilas suffers a drought.			
85	"Sarvejana Likhino Bhavanthu"			
86	" Chicken 65 03"			
87	"Meesam Purusha Lakshanam" - Parandhamayya explains the value of a mustache			
88	" 12 va pette" - Anji is haunted.			
89	"Nee Nune Momu Na Kanulara " Amrutham plays with his son.			
90	"Lali Jo Lali No" - Amrutham visits his son			
91	" Biddochina Vela Goddesthe" - Amrutham buys a cow and a calf.			
92	" Arda Raatri Swatantryam Vachindi" - Amrutham and Co. celebrate Independence Day			
93	" Baruvu Prathishta" - Amrutham tries to reduce weight.			
94	" Money Pressure Mini Ganesh" - Anji attempts to celebrate Vinayaka Chavithi			
95	"Anthuleni santhakam" - Amrutham buys a bike.			
96	"Chore Delivery" - Thieves attempt to steal from Amrutha Vilas.			
97	"Note Mata" Amrutham and Co start using Note Paper for everyday purposes.			
98	"Chevula Puli" - Anji's grandfather visits Amrutha Vilas.			
99	"Tolu Bommala Koluvu"			
100	"100" - Amrutham and Anji film their life in Hyderabad.			
101	"Ebandhulu" - Constant "strikes" disrupt Amrutha Vilas' business.			
102	"Deepavali Album" Anji and Appaji try to film Deepavali events.			
103	"TWO MEN ONE BRAIN" - Amrutham and Anji have a competition in sports			
104	"TWO MEN ONE BRAIN" Part 2 - Continuation of Amrutham and Anji's competition.			
105	"Pedda Balala Dinotsavam" - Children behave like elders and elders behave like children.			
106	"Athidi vaddo Bhava" - Amrutham is burdened by guests			
107	"Athidi vaddo Bhava" Part 2 They continue to bother him			
108	""CAT"Puli" - Anji becomes a CAT professor			
109	"Malli Pelli Roju" - Anji forgets his marriage day			
110	"Appaduguvadu Rogi" Amrutham & Anji request a bank loan			
111	"Appaduguvadu Rogi" Part 2 Bank loan process			
112	"Bad News" - Amrutham & Anji become news reporters			
113	"Pandagaku Mama Vachadu" - Amrutham & Anji celebrate Sankranthi			
114	"Break" - Amrutham and Anji star in an advertisement.			
115	"Ranathanthra Dinothsavam" - Anji & Amrutham celebrate Republic day			
116	"Idi Katha Kadu" - Amrutham and Anji create a story for a movie.			
117	"Idi Katha Kadu" Part 2 - Amrutham and Anji tell their story to Appaji.			
118	"Premikula Dinam" - Amrutha Vilas' celebrates Valentine's Day.			
119	"Shividayam" - Amrutham fasts for Maha Sivaratri			
120	"Kodi Dati Samvatsaram"			
121	"Vasantha Kakilaa" - 2 Political Rival Parties lodge in Amrutha Vilas			
122	"Total" - Amrutham and Anji start believing in Numerology.			
123	"Total" Part 2 AMrutham and Anji face a lot of problems due to numerology.			
124	"Samar Sung Cup" - Amrutham and Anji try to watch a cricket match without a cable connection.			
125	"Sri Rama Panchami" - Amrutham and Anji celebrate Sri Rama Navami			
126	"Shelavule Pareeksha" - A group of boys come for summer camp to Amrutha Vilas.			
127	"Kshana Kshanam" - Amrutham and Anji become supporters of a politician.			
128	" Servers Sundaram" - The summer camp boys revisit Amrutha Vilas.			
129	" Servers Sundaram" Part 2 - Sarvam trains the summer camp boys.			
130	"Jalagni" - Anji tries to bring water during a drought			
131	"Pellikala Vachindi" Amrutham spoils his sister-in-law's marriage.			
132	"Yaachaka Raachakam" - Beggars disrupt Amrutha Vilas' business			
133	"Patashala via Cherasala" - Amrutham tries to get school admission for his son.			
134	"Pan Parakasta" - Amrutham and Anji help build a Pan (Betel leaves) Shop beside their hotel.			
135	"Pan Parakasta" Part 2 - The Pan shop owner beats Amrutha Vilas' business.			
136	"Donga.CAM" - Amrutham finds a policeman's camera.			
137	"Pushpam-Pathram" - Amrutham and Anji bring loss even by staying away from the hotel			
138	"Baruvaina Pandem" - Amrutham has a bet with Appaji			
139	"Maikam Kammindi" - Crazy incidents of Amrutham and Anji.			
140	"Veggie Troubles"			
141	"Veggie Troubles" Part 2			
142	"Mundadugu Venakadugu" - The summer camp boys offer partnership in hotel business in Singapore.			
143	"Bomma Bagundi" - Amrutham and Co. break an antique doll of a customer.			
144	"Raktha Bandham" - Amrutham and Co. start a Drama serial with Rubber Balaji (cousin).			
145	"Veera Raktha Bandham" - Continuation of the Daily Serial making.			
146	"Maha Veera Raktha Bandham" - Telecast of Daily Serial.			
147	"Pushkar Ghatu" - Amrutham and Anji organize water for Pushkar Bath			
148	"Pracharam Hathya"			
149	" Money Pressure Mini Ganesh" - Anji doesn't celebrate Vinayaka Chavithi			
150	" Mama Bhalookama"- Amrutham mistakes his father-in-law for a Bear.			
151	"Dongalunaru Jagratha" - Amrutham tries to secure Anji's money from gnawing thieves.			
152	"Syeya....?" - Amrutham and Co. play a Rugby match with Appaji.			
153	"KshouraSagara Madanam" - Amrutham becomes a temporary barber.			
154	"Apajayadasami" - Appaji tries to get money by fooling Amrutham and Co.			
155	"Aatla Thaddi" - Anji and Amrutham face a big loss due to Sarvam's foolishness.			
156	"Erakka Poyi Vachanu" - Amrutham gets stuck inside a Supermarket			
157	"Balala Dinotsavam" - Amrutham celebrates Children's day			
158	"Helmet ki Boppi Kattindi" - Amrutham starts to sell Helmets	Harsha Vardhan		
159	"Puraskaram" -Amrutham and Anji get awarded			
160	"Showkokadidi -Shakokadidi" - Parandhamayya and Appaji quarrel about Hotel Management			
161	"Showkokadidi -Shakokadidi" Part 2 -Amrutham and Anji try to escape financial loss.			
162	"A Pradesh" - Andhra and Telangana divide in this episode.			
163	"CAKE – MASS" - Anji bakes a cake			
164	"Nishabda Shubhakankshalu" - Anji does not celebrate New Year grandly			
165	"Krishnarjuna Vijayam" - Appaji creates a division between Amrutham and Anji.			
166	"Evaridi Varike"			
167	"Anuchitha Power" - Amrutham and Co. have electricity problems.			
168	"Gore Goddalithey" - Amrutham and Anji face a financial loss due to silliness			
169	"Mouna Sangramam" - Amrutham stops talking in order to avoid scoldings from Parandhamayya.			
170	"Mouna Sangramam" Part 2 - Amrutham continues to stop talking.			
171	"Onte, Kothi – O Inti Owner" - Anji's distant brother arrives			
172	"Onte, Kothi – O Inti Owner" Part 2 Appaji faces a loss due to Amrutham, Anji, and Anji's cousin			
173	" 2 Varalu – 4 Raallu" - Amrutham and Anji celebrate Maha Shiva Ratri.			
174	" Prema Pavuram" - Sarvam loves Appaji's daughter.			
175	" Prema Pavuram" Part 2 - Sarvam continues to love Umadevi (Appaji's daughter).			
176	" Prema Pavuram" Part 3 - Appaji disagrees with Umadevi's and Sarvam's marriage.			
177	"O Sthree Repu Raa" A comic ghost situation			
178	"Pellala Pandaga" - Amrutham tries to deceive his father-in-law			
179	"Alludiki Valujada" - Amrutham spoils his father-in-law's business			
180	"Snehame ra Na Pranam" - Anji and Santha befriend a married couple.			
181	"Pillalu Etthukellevaru Challani vaaru" Part 1 Anji's son is kidnapped			
182	"Pillalu Etthukellevaru Challani vaaru" Part 2 Kidnapping problems			
183	"Pillalu Etthukellevaru Challani vaaru" Part 3 Continuation of Kidnapping problems			
184	"Chiru Jeetham Prema Geetham" - Sarvam's salary is doubled.			
185	"Agnatha Vasam" - Amrutham and Anji plan to go abroad			
186	"Agnatha Vasam" Part 2 Amrutham and Anji visit the hotel in disguises			
187	"Aadamani Nannadagavalena" - Spoof (jokes) on Chandramukhi.			
188	"Anukokunda Oka Function" -Anji organizes an audio function			
189	"Fine Art" - An artist presents his paintings in Amrutha Vilas			
190	"A Tea Z" - Amrutham mistakes drugs for milk powder			
191	"A Tea Z" Part 2 Customers get addicted to the drug Tea			
192	"Chaya Chithram" - Sarvam becomes a police informer.			
193	"Chaya Chithram" Part 2 - Sarvam helps police catch notorious robbers.			
194	"Ashadam lo Shade Marindi" - Anji faces a big financial loss			
195	" Suparichitudu" - Amrutham turns into SUPARICHITUDU due to Appaji's miserable taxes. A spoof about 'Aparichithudu'.			
196	" Suparichitudu" Part 2 - Continuation of Spoof on Aparichutudu.			
197	"Rogam Plus Rogam" - Amrutham and Anji get to know that they are suffering from lifestyle diseases (Diabetes and Blood -Pressure)			
198	"Vratham ...Rathamarchuna ?" - Amrutham disrupts a Ceremony (Vratham)			
199	"Sammeta Potu" - Anji hires Bullock Carts during a strike.			
200	"Gunndrayi" - Anji creates a giant undrayi.			
201	" Anukokunda Oh 1 Va Thedi" - Appaji suffers from some sort of amnesia			
202	"Municipal Mama Police ki Alludayyadu" - Amrutham and Anji try to improve Parandhamayya's political career.			
203	"Phone Kottu – Sodi Pettu" - Amrutham becomes a music show anchor.			
204	"Phone Kottu – Sodi Pettu " Part 2 -Continuation of Amrutham's anchoring.			
205	"Owner Tenent=Tolet" - Amrutham and Appaji have a bet about the hotel's turnover.			
206	"Pandem Kodi Bandam Veedi Poyindhi" - Amrutham does farming			
207	"Sahakara votu Dipawali ki Avutu" Amrutham spoils his father-in-law's politics			
208	"Pelli Pilupu Malupu" - Amrutham and Anji are invited to a wedding			
209	"Illu Illu Ekkadunnav" -Amrutham searches for a new house			
210	"Owner Power Paara Hushar"			
211	"Ghajini" - Amrutham gets Short-term Amnesia. Spoof on Ghajini			
212	"Ghajini" Part 2 - Appaji deceives Amrutham, manipulating him using his short-term memory loss.			
213	"Ghajini" Part 3 - Appaji buys Amrutham's new rented house.			
214	"Christmas Kanuka" - Amrutham's new house's previous owner sends them Christmas gifts.			
215	"Happy Mooki Year" Amrutham and Anji celebrate New Year			
216	"Happy Mooki Year" Part 2 Appaji comes to the New Year celebration.			
217	"Pathi-Padathi" - Amrutham disguises himself as a lady			
218	"Wrong Call" - Appaji gets stuck in a phone-tapping business			
219	"Jenda Kinda Kapirajul" - Amrutham and Co. along with Rubber Balaji create a short film about Mahatma Gandhi.			
220	"Jeetham x Jathakam = Jailu Jeevitham"			
221	"KadalanThe Premikudu" - Sarvam becomes a Cycle mechanic.			
222	"KadalanThe Premikudu" Part 2 - Sarvam loves a frequent cycle shop visitor.			
223	"Nidraahara Diksha" - Amrutham fasts and stays awake on Maha Shiva Ratri			
224	"VIP Kodi"			
225	"Daache koddee Dongala Palu" - Amrutham and CO. hide money from petty thieves.			
226	"Show Time Ayyipoindi" - Amrutham and Sanjeevini try to watch a movie in the theater.			
227	"Shunaka Prema Septic Chesindi" - Amrutham and Sarvam pet a dog			
228	"Teta Teta Telugu la" - Amrutham and Co. start a Telugu teaching class.			
229	"Telugu Raani Navami" - Anji and students perform a drama for Sri Rama Navami.			
230	"Telugu Lessa" - Amrutham teaches students in Telugu classes.			
231	"Telugu Noppi" - Telugu class students finish their course and conduct a Farewell party.			
232	"Ice Idly Sease Dosha"- Sarvam tries to hide 10-day-old idly from a Health inspector.			
233	"Bangaram Dukanam" - Amrutham becomes a Gold show anchor. Anji and Appaji become contestants.			
234	"Bangaram Dukanam" Part 2 - Continuation of the show.			
235	"Bangaram Dukanam" Part 3 - Anji wins Gold in Gold show			
236	"Raa Banduvulu" - Amrutham's relatives stop by at Amrutha Vila			
237	"Raa Banduvulu" Part 2 - Amrutham's relatives cause loss for Amrutham			
238	"Raa Banduvulu" Part 3 Amrutham tries to get rid of his relatives			
239	"Nanna" - Anji finds a little, lost girl			
240	"Nanna" Part 2 continuation of 'nanna'			
241	"Nanna" Part 3 The girl's real father arrives			
242	"Lucky Stone" - A Lucky stone businessman starts business in Amrutha Vilas.			
243	"Icchata Mootram poyaradu"			
244	"Owner vs Major" - Sarvam's grandfather visits Amrtuha Vilas.			
245	"Butler Brahmmachaari" - Anji and Appaji see matches for Sarvam.			
246	"Butler Brahmachaari" Part 2 - Continuation of matches for Sarvam.			
247	"Domakatu – Kodiki Chetu" - Amrutham gets sick because of a mosquito bite.			
248	"Radio Bajji Vs Breaking News" - Amrutham and Anji start a radio station. Appaji starts a news channel.			
249	"Radio Bajji Vs Breaking News" - Anji and Appaji's telecast lines intersect.			
250	"Chavithi Chali Mantalu" - Anji creates an ice Vinayaka for Vinayaka Chavithi.			
251	"Oka Pizza Katha" - Anji and Amrutham start a Pizza business.			
252	"Oka Pizza Katha" Part 2 - Anji and Amrutham start Pizza door delivery.			
253	"Oka Pizza Katha" Part 3 - Saevam becomes a door -delivery boy in Amrutha Vilas.			
254	"Gaali Prayanam" - Anji and Santha go to Delhi in a bullock cart.			
255	"Gaali Prayanam" Part 2 - Anji and Santha return from Delhi in a bullock cart.			
256	"Remote Sampadana" - Sarvam participates in Saree and Gold quiz shows on behalf of Santha.			
257	"Laden Masam" - Amrutham and Sarvam spot Osama Bin Laden			
258	"Laden Masam" Part 2 - Appaji disguises as a Muslim and goes to enjoy Iftar dinners during Ramzan			
259	"Hindi Waiter" - Hindi waiter is appointed			
260	"5 = 50 = 0" - Appaji tries to celebrate his birthday with Amrutham's money.			
261	"Gana Kokila" - Appaji craves Lata Mageshkar's song			
262	"Nomu Pandendi" - Amrutham celebrates a Ladies' festival.			
263	"Saree Exchange"			
264	"Cheviti Donga"			
265	"Clean Bold" - Amrutham and Anji introduce betting to their wives.			
266	"Clean Bold" Part 2 - Results of betting.			
267	"Savathsaram Marindhi" - Amrutham and Anji celebrate New Year with Liquor.			
268	"Pichiki Akhari Anthasthu" - Sarvam and Umadevi meet after a long time.			
269	"Sarukula Sandadi Saddumanigindi" - Amrutham buys large amounts of vegetables from a nearby shop.			
270	"Vajrostavam" - Amrutham and Anji try to celebrate Telugu Cinema Vajrotsavam			
271	"Beema Deeksha" - Sarvam goes on a fast for a scooter.			
272	"Uchita Viharam" - Amrutham relatives take advantage of Amrutham and make them pay hotel bills.			
273	"Uchita Viharam" Part 2 - Amrutham's relatives escape from the hotel, leaving a financial loss to Amrutham			
274	"Divvi Divvi TV Tom" - Anji and Amrutham conduct a marriage			
275	"Sulabha Sulochanalu" - Amrutham has a problem with his spectacles.			
276	"Santhakam Cheyste pallu Vralu" - Sarvam learns how to sign.			
277	"Ennikala Pariksha" - Amrutham competes for MLA seat.			
278	"Ennikala Pariksha" - Part 2 Continuation of MLA seat competition.			
279	"Ennikala Pariksha" Part 3 - The results of MLA seats.			
280	"April Fool" - Amrutham and Appaji take part in an "April Fool" contest.			
281	"Chakravaddi" - Appaji tries to put off a debt.			
282	"Belt Bhagavatham" - It is revealed that Appaji's belt has sadistic powers.			
283	"Ashoka Vanam" - Amrutham tries to escape every day tensions			
284	"Pesarlu-Wardu" - Appaji gets sick by eating old stock of Pesarappapu.			
285	"International Sarvam"- Sarvam dreams of going to Canada.			
286	"Bootha Vilas" - A ghost haunts Amrutham and Sundaram.			
287	"Bootha Vilas" Part 2 - A ghost haunts Sarvam and Anji			
288	"Bootha Vilas" Part 3 - The same ghost haunts Anji and Appaji, and Amrutham finds out more about the ghost.			
289	"Sarvam Sundaram" - Sarvam and Sundaram have a competition about who is the best.			
290	"Andaru Sarvarle " - Amrutham and Anji disguise as Servers to supervise the hotel business.			
291	"Operation Villas" - Sarvam tries to rescue Sundaram from his uncle's clutches			
292	"Shooting Cheystam" - Sarvam and Sundaram visit film shooting (filming).			
293	"Brathuke Oka Serial" - Rubber Balaji and Amrutham and Anji create a serial.			
294	"Brathuke Oka Serial" Part 2 - Serial filming continues.			
295	"Brathuke Oka Serial" Part 3 - Serial telecast.			
296	"Dongallo Donga" - Sarvam becomes a thief who steals from other thieves.			
297	"Kitchen To Kamatham To Narakam" - Anji harvests vegetables.			
298	"Appaharana" - Kidnaps of main characters take place.			
299	"Eenaati Ee Bandham Enatido" - Anji tries to help Sarvam marry Umadevi.			
300	"Pannu Bharam" - Amrutham and Co. attempt to avoid taxes.			
301	"Pesara Power" - Appaji craves for Amrutha Vilas' Pesarattu.			
302	"Baruvaina Balahinatha" - Appaji tricks Amrutham in order to get free food.			
303	"24 Gantala News" - Amrutham and Anji go crazy after watching news 24 hours a day			
304	"Donga Yama" - Sarvam loses Appaji's family heirloom locket.			
305	"Donga Yama" Part 2 - Sarvam worships Lord Yama in order to find the locket.			
306	"Donga Yama" Part 3 - Sarvam finds the locket.			
307	"Bamma Kalapam" - Appaji brings his old age aunt.			
308	"Bamma Kalapam" Part 2 - Sarvam serves as a maid to Appaji's aunt.			
309	"Dagudu Moothalu" - Appaji tries to get rid of Sarvam.			
310	"Pracharam Mithya" - Anji, Sarvam, and Sundaram advertise for nearby shops.			
311	"UN – Happy Days " - Anji recollects his college memories.			
312	"UN – Happy Days" Part 2 - The continuation of Anji's memories.			
313	"Tata Bye Bye Veedukolu" - This is the last episode of the serial. An unimaginable twist happens after they close the hotel.			

== Themes ==
Amrutham is celebrated for its humorous and satirical portrayal of middle-class life, combining everyday struggles with sharp social commentary. The show addresses a wide range of topics, including societal norms, superstitions, education, and media culture, all while maintaining its family-friendly appeal. A central theme of the series is the relatable challenges of middle-class existence, such as financial difficulties, societal expectations, and modest ambitions. The comedic dynamic between Amrutham and his business partner Anji brings out the humour in mundane situations, like managing their struggling restaurant or navigating interactions with their eccentric landlord.

The series is celebrated for its sharp satire, often critiquing cultural practices and traditions. Episodes such as Muggu Gumma and Amma! Anakondamma address issues like gender roles and the exploitation of superstitions with a humorous twist, making these topics approachable and entertaining. Education and modernity frequently feature in the series, with episodes like Aam Set poking fun at the intense pressure of competitive exams, and others highlighting the quirks of technological adoption.

Amrutham also excels in its absurdist humour, presenting ridiculous yet relatable scenarios. From adopting an earthworm to lift a family curse to dealing with a constipated cow during a housewarming ceremony, the series features some outlandish premises. The show’s commentary extends to media culture, as seen in episodes like Raktha Bandham and Brathuke Oka Serial, which parody the melodrama and stereotypes of soap operas and television shows.

== Release ==
=== Broadcast ===
Amrutham originally aired on Gemini TV every Sunday on prime time 8:30 PM slot for exactly six years. The first episode Go Gruha Pravesam aired on 18 November 2001 while the final episode Tata Bye Bye Veedkolu aired on 18 November 2007. The serial had over 100 hours of content divided into 313 episodes.

=== Syndication and streaming ===
Amrutham was re-telecasted multiple times on various TV channels and garnered good ratings each time. After the end of its original run on Gemini TV, Zee Telugu acquired the telecast rights of the show and broadcast it as a daily serial beginning from 26 November 2007, only a week after the end of its original broadcast on Gemini TV. It ran from Monday to Thursday in the prime time 9:00 PM slot. Later, it was broadcast on Maa TV in the weekend days at 7:00 PM. After that, its rights were again acquired by Gemini TV which telecasted it as a daily serial from Monday to Friday at 10:30 PM. Later, it was broadcast on Maa Gold as a daily serial in the 10:00 PM slot. Then, ETV Plus broadcast it as a daily serial from Monday to Friday at 9:30 PM. As of July 2017, it was being telecast as a daily serial on ETV Plus from Monday to Saturday at 6:00 PM.

All the episodes of Amrutham were uploaded on YouTube by the production house Just Yellow Media. It was highly successful and garnered a total of 250 million views. Later, ZEE5 acquired the digital rights of the series and Amrutham was removed from YouTube by Just Yellow Media.

Currently the episodes are now available to watch again on Youtube at Amrutham HD Remastered

== Reception and impact ==
Maybe there is a dearth of decent comedy in Telugu TV channels. The comedy dished out is neither comic at all nor clean. Somehow people tend to interlace sex in Telugu comedy. We won over half the audience by not having vulgarity. Parents are happy that kids are addicted to Amrutam. The screenplay for Amrutam episodes is one of the most intricate with lots of twists and punches packed in the duration of 20 minutes. The end bang is always unexpected. It is the 5th year running and Amrutam is still the number one.

— Gunnam Gangaraju in 2006, explaining the reasons for the success of Amrutham

The show was an instant success. It garnered high TRP ratings throughout its run of six years. Gangaraju mentioned that Amrutham was cancelled by choice when it was at its peak as they were exhausted of ideas. It is widely considered to be among the greatest Telugu comedy TV series of all time.

After the end of its original run, Idlebrain.com noted, "When soaps were mostly women-oriented, Amrutham came as a breath of fresh air with four male characters in the lead. Amrutha Vilas became a household name in Andhra Pradesh and all the characters Amrutha Rao, Anji, Appaji, and Sarvam became lovable characters and the viewers waited to watch them in every episode."

In 2020, director S. S. Rajamouli wrote about the show, "19 years ago, when tear-jerking daily soaps were ruling the roost, it took guts and conviction of one man to come up with a comedy show breaking all norms. What a success story from its ever unsuccessful heroes Anji and Amrutha Rao. True to its name Amrutham made a mark in the hearts of Telugus across the globe."

== Awards and nominations ==
Awards and nominations received by Amrutham
Award	Year	Category	Recipient	Result	Ref.
Nandi TV Awards	2005	Best Comedian	Gundu Hanumantha Rao	Won	
Nandi TV Awards	2006	Best Comedian	Vasu Inturi	Won	
Nandi TV Awards	2007	Second Best Mega Serial	Gangaraju Gunnam Sandeep Gunnam	Won	
Nandi TV Awards	2007	Best Comedian Actress	Pavala Syamala	Won	

== Future ==
A spin-off film titled Amrutham Chandamamalo was released in 2014. Amrutham Dhvitheeyam, directed by Gunnam Sandeep, was broadcast on ZEE5 during 2020-21.
