= Nanna (TV series) =

- Also known as: Nana
- Genre: Dramedy
- Created by: Gangaraju Gunnam
- Written by: Gangaraju Gunnam
- Screenplay by: Gangaraju Gunnam
- Story by: Malladi Venkata Krishna Murthy
- Directed by: Muralikrishna Muddineni
- Starring: Dr. Nutan Prasad; Master Vamsi Mohan; Naveen; Anitha Chowdary; Sivannarayana Naripeddi
- Theme music composer: Kalyani Malik
- Opening theme: Amma Cheppindi by Kalyani Malik

Production
- Producers: Gangaraju Gunnam; Venkat Dega

Nanna or Nana was a Telugu television show. The show aired on Gemini TV from 19 April 2004 as a bi-weekly serial, ending on 25 September 2005 with 86 episodes. The serial was based on a novel by Malladi Venkata Krishna Murthy which was earlier made into a feature film. The serial won the Best T.V. Serial – 2004 Nandi Award.

== Production ==
The show was produced by Venkat Dega and Ganga Raju Gunnam, with the company Just Yellow Media, and directed by Muralikrishna Mudidhani. The script was written by Aasam Srinivas, based on a novel by Malladi Venkata Krishna Murthy. The show's music was composed by Kalyani Mallik.

== Cast ==
- Nutan Prasad as a Kakarla Dasaratha Ramayya
- Master Vamsi Mohan as Siddhart "Siddu"
- Naveen as Kakarla Sambasivarao "Sambudu"
- Anitha Chowdary as Julie/Sarada
- Preeti Amin/Swathi as Kavitha (Sambasiva's wife)
- Raghunatha Reddy as Kakarla Dasaratharamayya's best friend.
- Sivannarayana Naripeddi as Panchaksharam (Sambasivarao's best friend)
- Ragini as Suguna
- Chitralekha as Nandini
- Bharani Shankar as Bharani
- Vasu Inturi as S.I. Anki Reddy

== Awards ==
Ceremony	Category	Nominee	Result
Nandi TV Awards 2004	First best TV serial	Nanna (Ganga Raju Gunnam)	WON
Nandi TV Awards 2004	Best dialogue writer	Aasam Srinivas	WON
Nandi TV Awards 2004	Best child artist	Master Vamsi Mohan	WON
Nandi TV Awards 2004	Best supporting actress	Ragini	WON
