= S. S. Kanchi =

Indian writer, actor and director

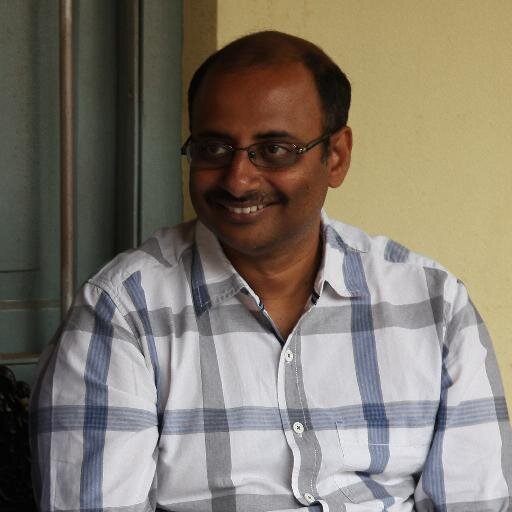
- Born: Koduri Siva Shakthi Datta Kanchi; Vijayawada, Andhra Pradesh, India
- Occupations: Writer; Actor; Director
- Years active: 2001–present
- Relatives: Siva Shakthi Datta (father); M. M. Keeravani (brother); Kalyani Malik (brother); V. Vijayendra Prasad (uncle); S. S. Rajamouli (cousin); M. M. Srilekha (cousin)

S. S. Kanchi is an Indian writer, actor and director known for his work in Telugu cinema and television. He is recognised for his contributions as a writer and supporting actor in the acclaimed Telugu sitcom Amrutham and for his roles in films such as Sye (2004) and Maryada Ramanna (2010). He is a member of the prominent Koduri family, which includes film personalities such as music composer M. M. Keeravani, director S. S. Rajamouli, and screenwriter V. Vijayendra Prasad.

== Early life ==
Kanchi was born in Andhra Pradesh, India, into the Koduri family, which has roots in Telugu cinema. He is the son of lyricist and writer Siva Shakthi Datta. His elder brother is composer M. M. Keeravani, while his younger brother is music director Kalyani Malik. He is also the nephew of screenwriter V. Vijayendra Prasad and cousin of filmmaker S. S. Rajamouli.

Growing up in a creative household surrounded by writers, composers and filmmakers influenced his interest in storytelling and acting from a young age.

== Career ==
=== Television ===
Kanchi gained prominence through his work on the Telugu sitcom Amrutham (2001–2007). He contributed as:

- a **writer** for several episodes, and
- an **actor**, playing **Ambhujanabham**, the strict and humorous boss of the protagonist in the early episodes.

He has also been associated with various projects under **Just Yellow Media**, contributing to writing, creative development and concept work.

=== Film ===
Kanchi has appeared in several Telugu films in comedic and supporting roles. Notable acting credits include:

- Sye (2004) – supporting role
- Maryada Ramanna (2010) – supporting role
- Amrutham Chandamamalo (2014) – cameo
- Mathu Vadalara (2019) – supporting role
- Dear Comrade (2019) – supporting appearance

=== Writing and direction ===
In addition to acting, Kanchi has contributed significantly as a writer and creative consultant.

His writing credits include:

- Amrutham (2001–2007) – writer
- Maryada Ramanna (2010) – story contributor
- Eega (2012) – writing department (additional story inputs)
- Amrutham Chandamamalo (2014) – story, screenplay and dialogue team
- Vallavanukku Pullum Aayudham (2014) – story basis (Tamil remake of Maryada Ramanna)

He has also contributed to various comedy and concept-driven projects under Just Yellow Media.

== Personal life ==
S. S. Kanchi is part of the Koduri–Rajamouli family, one of the most influential film families in Telugu cinema. His close relatives include:

- **Father:** Siva Shakthi Datta – lyricist
- **Brothers:** M. M. Keeravani and Kalyani Malik – music composers
- **Uncle:** V. Vijayendra Prasad – screenwriter
- **Cousins:** S. S. Rajamouli (director), M. M. Srilekha (composer), and Raja Koduri (tech executive)
- **Nephews:** Kaala Bhairava (singer–composer), Sri Simha (actor), and S. S. Karthikeya (filmmaker)

== Filmography ==
=== As actor ===
- Simhadri (2003) as Ambujam
- Sye (2004) as Indu’s father
- Maryada Ramanna (2010) as Train Co-Passenger
- Amrutham Chandamamalo (2014)
- Mathu Vadalara (2019)
- Dear Comrade (2019) as Jaya’s father
- Ante Sundaraniki (2022) as sex doctor
- Little Hearts (2025) as Khatyayini's father

=== Television ===
- Amrutham (2001–2007) – Writer; Actor (Ambhujanabham)

=== As writer ===
- Amrutham (2001–2007)
- Maryada Ramanna (2010) – story
- Eega (2012) – writing department
- Amrutham Chandamamalo (2014) – screenplay & dialogue
- Vallavanukku Pullum Aayudham (2014) – original story basis
- Various Just Yellow Media comedy projects
- Varanasi (2027) – story

== See also ==
- Koduri family
- M. M. Keeravani
- S. S. Rajamouli
- V. Vijayendra Prasad
