= Varanasi (film) =

Upcoming Indian film by S. S. Rajamouli

- Promotional poster
- Directed by: S. S. Rajamouli
- Screenplay by: S. S. Rajamouli
- Story by: V. Vijayendra Prasad; S. S. Kanchi
- Dialogues by: Deva Katta
- Produced by: K. L. Narayana; S. S. Karthikeya
- Starring: Mahesh Babu; Priyanka Chopra; Prithviraj Sukumaran
- Cinematography: P. S. Vinod
- Visual effects by: V. Srinivas Mohan
- Edited by: Bikkina Thammiraju
- Music by: M. M. Keeravani
- Production companies: Sri Durga Arts; Showing Business
- Release date: 7 April 2027
- Country: India
- Language: Telugu
- Budget: ₹1,400 crore

Varanasi (Note: stylized onscreen as Vāranāsi or S. S. Rajamouli's Varanasi) is an upcoming Indian Telugu-language epic action-adventure film directed by S. S. Rajamouli, who co-wrote the film with V. Vijayendra Prasad and S. S. Kanchi. Produced by Sri Durga Arts and Showing Business, the film stars Mahesh Babu in a dual role alongside Priyanka Chopra and Prithviraj Sukumaran. The plot follows the adventures of Rudhra (Babu) as the city of Varanasi faces the impending arrival of an asteroid, with the narrative spanning across several timelines.

Rajamouli conceived the film as a globetrotting adventure rooted in Indian cultural themes, drawing inspiration from the structure and emotional tone of classic adventure cinema. (Note: Rajamouli mentioned the Indiana Jones franchise, especially Raiders of the Lost Ark, as the inspiration.) Initial discussions for a collaboration with Mahesh Babu began in 2010, but the project materialised only after the completion of RRR (2022). The film was formally launched in January 2025, and principal photography commenced the following month in Hyderabad. Filming took place extensively in Hyderabad, in addition to Odisha, Kenya and Georgia. With an estimated budget of ₹1,400 crore, it is set to become the second most expensive Indian film ever made. The film has music composed by M. M. Keeravani, cinematography by P. S. Vinod, and visual effects by V. Srinivas Mohan.

Varanasi is scheduled to be theatrically released on 7 April 2027, coinciding with Ugadi. It is the first Indian film to be shot in the 1.43:1 IMAX format.

== Premise ==
Varanasi follows the adventures of Rudhra as the city of Varanasi in India faces the impending threat of an asteroid. The narrative moves across multiple yugas — from Treta Yuga to Kali Yuga — and also spans across continents, from Africa to Antarctica.

== Cast ==
- Mahesh Babu in a dual role as
  - Rudhra
  - Lord Rama (Note: Attributed to multiple references:)
- Priyanka Chopra as Mandakini
- Prithviraj Sukumaran as Kumbha
- Prakash Raj

== Production ==
=== Development ===
Initial discussions for director S. S. Rajamouli's first collaboration with actor Mahesh Babu date back to 2010, though the project underwent several delays due to unspecified reasons. During this period, K. L. Narayana's Sri Durga Arts was confirmed as the production banner attached to the film. Following the success of Baahubali 2: The Conclusion in 2017, it was reported that Rajamouli and Mahesh Babu would proceed with a film together, marking their maiden collaboration. In October 2017, Rajamouli revealed in an interview with Variety that he had two forthcoming projects in development: one to be produced by D. V. V. Danayya under DVV Entertainment and the other by Sri Durga Arts. Rajamouli chose to begin with the DVV Entertainment project, which ultimately became RRR (2022).

In April 2020, Rajamouli confirmed that the Sri Durga Arts project, featuring Mahesh in the lead, would commence production after the completion of RRR. In June 2021, V. Vijayendra Prasad, Rajamouli's father and co-writer, stated that the film was being conceived as an African forest adventure. In October 2021, Mahesh confirmed that filming would begin after he completed work on Guntur Kaaram (2024).

Describing the film as a "globetrotting action adventure" and a "James Bond or Indiana Jones" adventure, Rajamouli noted that it would follow the stylistic lines of Indiana Jones while retaining Indian cultural roots. K Vijayendra Prasad added that the film would incorporate emotional elements similar to Raiders of the Lost Ark (1981). It is also reported that the ancient city of Varanasi forms a crucial part of the story. The film is made on a projected budget of ₹1,400 crore, with both Rajamouli and Babu reportedly taking the revenue sharing model to benefit the film's production; as per the basis, they would receive an advance, and 40% of the profits would be received as their remuneration. The film was popularly referred to in the media as SSMB29, as it is intended to be Babu's 29th film as a lead actor, until the official title Varanasi was announced on 15 November 2025. Other working titles included GlobeTrotter and Gen 63 (Generation 63). A title dispute arose over the film because Rama Bramha Hanuma Creations, led by C.H. Subba Reddy, claimed to own the rights to the name (registered as Vaaranasi) with the Telugu Film Producers’ Council since 2023. Rajamouli's team used a slightly different spelling “Vāranāsi” when announcing the film, sparking questions about who legally owns the title. Later, the dispute was resolved after Telugu version's name was changed to "Rajamouli's Varanasi" while in other versions the name "Varanasi" was retained. In October 2026, it was reported that Rajamouli will create another fictional language for the film, similar to Kiliki language from Baahubali (franchise).

=== Pre-production ===
The development of the story started in 2022 and took 2 years to complete. In March 2024, Rajamouli and Prasad had completed the final draft of the script and the project moved into pre-production. In January 2024, Babu flew to Germany to undergo intense physical training as part of preparation for his role. In October, Rajamouli was seen scouting for shooting locations in Kenya (Amboseli National Park). A muhurat puja was held on 2 January 2025 in Hyderabad with the cast and crew.

In September 2024, P. S. Vinod was announced as the cinematographer, in his first collaboration with Rajamouli and replacing K. K. Senthil Kumar, Rajamouli's norm collaborator for cinematography since Sye (2004). M. M. Keeravani, who has scored the music for all of Rajamouli's films, was roped in as the music director. Tammiraju was chosen as the film's editor. Actor Nassar was brought on board to help the crew, where he assisted Babu in training on a dialect.

=== Casting ===
Babu was reported to play the male lead. Priyanka Chopra Jonas was confirmed as the female lead, marking her first collaboration with Babu and Rajamouli and her return to Indian cinema after The Sky Is Pink (2019) and to Telugu Cinema after Thoofan (2013). Prithviraj Sukumaran was signed as the antagonist, marking his third Telugu film after Police Police (2010) and Salaar: Part 1 – Ceasefire (2023). Rajamouli signed with Creative Artists Agency (CAA) after the success of RRR, and would reportedly be using various American actors for this film. Rajat Kapoor was signed to for a role. However, Kapoor later left the project due to creative differences. In December 2025, Prakash Raj joined the production.

=== Filming ===
In September 2024, it was reported that Rajamouli would firstly prioritize sequences which would need VFX when filming, due to the film reportedly featuring multiple VFX-based action sequences. Principal photography was initially reported to commence in 2024, but finally commenced on 2 February 2025 in Hyderabad. Babu and Chopra were both present during the schedule. To avoid leaks of the project, Rajamouli enforced a non-disclosure agreement for the cast and crew, while also banning mobile phones on sets. Chopra resumed filming her portions in early February after attending her brother's wedding.

The second schedule commenced in Odisha on 5 March 2025, featuring mainly Babu and Sukumaran. For the third schedule, a massive set resembling Kashi was erected at Talamali Hilltop in the Semiliguda block of Koraput district, where an action sequence was shot. On 9 March 2025, footage featuring both actors was leaked on social media platforms. In April 2025, an elaborate set, again resembling the ancient city of Kashi, was erected in Hyderabad. By September 2025, important sequences were shot across Kenya's Masai Mara, Naivasha, Samburu and Amboseli. In November 2025, it was confirmed by Rajamouli that the filming of the climax scenes was underway. The team also shot an episode featuring the events of the Ramayana for 60 days. In March 2026, it was announced that the next schedule would be in Antarctica, thus making it the first Indian film and fourth feature film in history to shoot on location in Antarctica. The annnouncement confirmed that the team would be filming at the Ross Ice Shelf. However, due to logistical challenges and war in Middle East, an Antarctica set was created in Hyderabad and additional portions were shot in snowy landscapes of Georgia in the same month.

In June 2026, S. S. Rajamouli revealed that filming for the IMAX action sequences had been completed, with only the interconnecting scenes remaining to be shot. In July 2026, a massive battle sequence featuring Babu alongside thousands of junior artists was filmed in Hyderabad. Originally, this sequence was scheduled to be filmed in Varanasi, however it was moved to Hyderabad due to logistical reasons. By August 2026, Rajamouli revealed that around 80% of the shoot was completed. He also revealed that the film's storyline will revolve around Varanasi, Antarctica, Africa and Ancient Rome. By September, the film entered into its final phase of shooting. Principal photography was wrapped by November 2026.

=== Visual effects ===
The visual effects for Varanasi are overseen by V. Srinivas Mohan, in his fourth collaboration with Rajamouli following Baahubali: The Beginning (2015), Baahubali 2: The Conclusion (2017), and RRR (2022). Due to the high volume of complex sequences, Rajamouli prioritized VFX-heavy filming early in the schedule to allow for a two-year post-production window.

==== Production and vendors ====
In March 2026, London-based Cinesite announced that it would serve as the primary VFX vendor, alongside its subsidiary Trixter and Mumbai-based Assemblage Entertainment. Assemblage, which won the 2026 Zee Cine Award for Best VFX for Chhaava, is handling specialized character animation for the film's mythological creatures. For the three-minute announcement reel released in November 2025, Mohan collaborated with several specialized boutiques, including Phantom FX for set extensions and Meta VFX for digital doubles. Mohan stated that the teaser avoided the use of generative AI, opting for traditional artist-driven CGI to maintain the photorealism required for the IMAX 1.43:1 aspect ratio.

=== Technology and performance capture ===
A significant portion of the film was shot at the A&M MoCap Lab at Annapurna Studios in Hyderabad, which Rajamouli inaugurated in March 2026. The facility, a joint venture with Mihira Visual Labs and technology partner Animatrik Film Design, is the largest motion and performance capture stage in India. The laboratory utilizes 26-megapixel Vicon Valkyrie (VK26) cameras and integrates Unreal Engine for real-time visualization, allowing Rajamouli to adjust camera movements and blocking within digital environments during live shoots. A 25-minute sequence, reportedly involving the hero's traversal through multiple eras, was captured entirely on this stage.

== Music ==
The soundtrack is composed by Rajamouli's frequent collaborator M. M. Keeravani.

No.	Title	Lyrics	Singer(s)	Length
1.	"GlobeTrotter"	Chaitanya Prasad	Shruti Haasan, Kaala Bhairava	3:35
2.	"Rana Kumbha"	Chaitanya Prasad	Aditya Iyengar	1:40
3.	"The Arrival"		M. M. Keeravani	3:22

== Marketing ==
A pre-look poster was released on 9 August 2025, coinciding with Babu's 50th birthday. Rajamouli also revealed that the film's first look would be launched in November 2025. Later, an event titled The Globetrotter Event was held on 15 November 2025 at Ramoji Film City, with the presence of the film's cast and crew, during which the film's official title and first concept reel were launched. It was streamed live on JioHotstar in India, becoming the first movie launch to be streamed on a streaming service while Variety streamed the event internationally on YouTube. In the same event, Rajamouli announced that Varanasi is being shot in the 1.43:1 IMAX format, making Varanasi the first Indian film to do so.

== Release ==
=== Theatrical ===
The film is scheduled to be released theatrically worldwide on 7 April 2027 in standard, Dolby Cinema, and IMAX formats. Shot in Telugu, it will also be released with dubbed versions in the Hindi, Tamil, Malayalam, and Kannada languages. It is the first Indian film to feature 1.43:1 IMAX ratio sequences, and the first Indian film in the world releasing in more than 120 countries globally.
