= Veeranjaneyulu Viharayatra =

2024 Indian Telugu-language film by Anurag Palutla

- Release poster
- Directed by: Anurag Palutla
- Written by: Anurag Palutla
- Produced by: Bapineedu B; Sudheer Edara
- Starring: Naresh; Sri Lakshmi; Rag Mayur; Priya Vadlamani
- Cinematography: Ankur Sanjeev
- Edited by: Naresh Adupa; Hari Shankar TN
- Music by: RH Vikram
- Production company: Dream Farmers
- Distributed by: ETV Win
- Release date: 14 August 2024
- Running time: 121 minutes
- Country: India
- Language: Telugu

Veeranjaneyulu Viharayatra is a 2024 Indian Telugu-language road comedy drama film written and directed by Anurag Palutla. The film features Naresh, Sri Lakshmi, Rag Mayur and Priya Vadlamani in important roles.

The film was released on 14 August 2024 on ETV Win. The Hollywood Reporter India listed Naresh's performance in "The 10 Best Telugu Film Performances of 2024".

== Cast ==
- Naresh as Nageswara Rao
- Sri Lakshmi
- Rag Mayur as Veeranjaneyulu Jr. "Veeru"
- Priya Vadlamani as Sarayu
- Harsha Vardhan as Doctor Paramahamsa
- Vasu Inturi as CI Putta Swami
- Priyadarshini as Savitri
- Taruna as Aishwarya
- Ravi Teja Mahadasyam as Tharun
- Brahmanandam as Veeranjaneyulu Sr. (Cameo Appearance); Nageswara Rao's father and narrator of this film.

== Music ==
The film's soundtrack album and background score were composed by RH Vikram.

All music is composed by RH Vikram.

Track list
No.	Title	Lyrics	Singer(s)	Length
1.	"AyyAyyo"	Sanapati Bharadwaj Patrudu	Mano	4:01
2.	"Gaali Vaana"	Sanapati Bharadwaj Patrudu	Manoj Krishna	1:23
3.	"O Malupe"	Krishna Kanth	Gowtham Bharadwaj	1:14
4.	"Aakasame"	Kittu Vissapragada	Niranjana Ramanan, Gowtham Bharadwaj	4:45
5.	"Theerana"	Kittu Vissapragada	Niranjana Ramana	2:06
6.	"Oh Premalokam"	Sanapati Bharadwaj Patrudu	Karthik, Pavithra Chari	2:58

== Release ==
Veeranjaneyulu Viharayatra was released on 14 August 2024 ETV Win.

== Reception ==
Sangeetha Devi Dundoo of The Hindu gave a positive review stating "Veeranjaneyulu Viharayatra tries to be more than a simple family drama, akin to Kapoor & Sons", while appreciating the performances of the lead cast. Avad Mohammad of OTTPlay opined that the film has an interesting premise but was affected by predictable narration.
