= Harsha Vardhan =

Indian actor

- Born: Vizianagaram, Andhra Pradesh, India
- Occupations: Actor; comedian; screenwriter
- Years active: 1997–present

Harsha Vardhan is an Indian actor and screenwriter who works in Telugu films and television shows.

He is known for his performance in television shows such as Ruthuragalu and Amrutham and has appeared in more than seventy five films in a variety of roles.

== Filmography ==
=== Telugu films ===
| † | Denotes films that have not yet been released |

Acting roles
| Year | Title | Role | Notes |
|---|---|---|---|
| 2001 | Chirujallu | Harsha | |
| 2003 | Aithe | Chotu | Bilingual film |
| 2004 | Athade Oka Sainyam | Prakash Rao's goon | |
| 2005 | Anukokunda Oka Roju | Harsha | |
| 2005 | Danger | Rajesh | |
| 2005 | Athadu | Harsha | |
| 2006 | Rakhi | Auto driver | |
| 2006 | Veedhi | | |
| 2006 | Pournami | Pournami's uncle | |
| 2006 | Game | Harsha | |
| 2006 | Stalin | Stalin Friend’s | |
| 2007 | Lakshmi Kalyanam | | |
| 2007 | Anasuya | Harsha | |
| 2008 | Three | Psychiatrist | |
| 2008 | Nenu Meeku Telusa? | Doctor | |
| 2009 | Indumathi | Anand | |
| 2009 | Diary | | |
| 2009 | Adugu | | |
| 2009 | Josh | Vidhya's brother | |
| 2010 | Kedi | Arshad | |
| 2010 | Leader | Ali | |
| 2010 | Gaayam 2 | Harsha | |
| 2010 | Yagam | | |
| 2011 | Vykuntapali | KKR alias Kakarlapudi Krishna Ram | |
| 2011 | Gaganam | Srinivas | Bilingual film |
| 2011 | KSD Appalaraju | Pushpanand | |
| 2011 | Vankai Fry | | |
| 2011 | Golconda High School | | |
| 2011 | Bhale Mogudu Bhale Pellam | | |
| 2012 | Kulu Manali | | |
| 2012 | Ayyare | | |
| 2012 | SMS | | |
| 2012 | Lovely | Akash's brother | |
| 2012 | Gabbar Singh | Doctor | |
| 2013 | Chal Chal | | |
| 2013 | Dalam | | |
| 2014 | Hrudayam Ekkadunnadi | Manmadha | |
| 2014 | Govindudu Andarivadele | Chandrasekhar's friend | |
| 2014 | Geethanjali | Venkatesh | |
| 2014 | Aagadu | Chenna Kesavulu | |
| 2014 | Bangaru Kodipetta | Kumar | |
| 2015 | Bruce Lee: The Fighter | Ria's Uncle | |
| 2016 | Manamantha | Viswanath | |
| 2016 | Oopiri | Police Inspector | Uncredited |
| 2017 | Veedevadu | Sub-Inspector Hyder | |
| 2018 | Pantham | Anand Surana's Staff | |
| 2019 | Brochevarevarura | CI Srinu | |
| 2019 | 118 | | |
| 2020 | Ala Vaikunthapurramloo | Kashiram | |
| 2021 | Alludu Adhurs | Psychiatrist | |
| 2021 | Zombie Reddy | Pratap Reddy | |
| 2021 | Check | Astrologer | |
| 2021 | Akshara | Raghava Master | |
| 2021 | Ek Mini Katha | G. Satya Kishore | |
| 2021 | Maestro | Dr. Swamy | |
| 2021 | Varudu Kaavalenu | Bhoomi's client | |
| 2021 | Pushpaka Vimanam | Sundar's neighbour | |
| 2021 | Raja Vikramarka | Muddu Krishna | |
| 2021 | Senapathi | Paramjyothi | |
| 2022 | Ante Sundaraniki | Manager Chandra Mohan | |
| 2022 | Swathi Muthyam | Dr. Daiva Prasad | |
| 2022 | HIT: The Second Case | Ram Prasad Koduri | |
| 2022 | Godfather | Jailer | |
| 2022 | Boyfriend for Hire | Arjun’s uncle | |
| 2023 | Ravanasura | Prosecutor | |
| 2023 | Miss Shetty Mr Polishetty | Doctor | |
| 2023 | Extra Ordinary Man | Mohanthi | |
| 2024 | Naa Saami Ranga | SI Thirupatayya | |
| 2024 | Sundaram Master | MLA | |
| 2024 | Satyabhama | Anand Rao | |
| 2024 | Sarangadhariya | Murthy | |
| 2024 | Veeranjaneyulu Viharayatra | Paramahamsa | |
| 2024 | Maruthi Nagar Subramanyam | Amrutham | |
| 2024 | Saripodhaa Sanivaaram | Sudhakar (Sudha) | |
| 2024 | Mechanic Rocky | Natraj / Vivek | |
| 2025 | Neeli Megha Shyama | Viplav | |
| 2025 | Court | Adv. Damodhar | |
| 2025 | Meghalu Cheppina Prema Katha | Meghana’s boss | |
| 2025 | Paradha | Madhav | |
| 2025 | Santhana Prapthirasthu | Chaitanya’s brother-in-law | |
| 2025 | Andhra King Taluka | College Principal | |
| 2025 | Champion | Patwari Ranga Rao | |
| 2026 | Mana Shankara Vara Prasad Garu | Narayana | |
| 2026 | Mrithyunjay | Jay’s boss | |
| 2026 | Hey Balwanth | PVB | |
| 2026 | Gaayapadda Simham | ACP Ashok Vardhan | |
| 2026 | Vishwambhara † | TBA | |

=== Other language films ===
| Year | Title | Role | Language | Notes |
|---|---|---|---|---|
| 2007 | 50 Lakh | Chotu | Hindi | Bilingual films |
| 2011 | Payanam | Srinivas | Tamil | Bilingual films |
| 2014 | Koottam | | Tamil | Bilingual films |
| 2016 | 24 | Kalai | Tamil | |
| 2017 | Poorna: Courage Has No Limit | N. Kiran Kumar Reddy | Hindi | |
| 2017 | Yaar Ivan | Sub-Inspector Hyder | Tamil | Bilingual film |

=== Other crew positions ===
Other credited roles
| Year | Title | Director | Writer | Notes |
|---|---|---|---|---|
| 2008 | Visakha Express | No | Dialogues | |
| 2008 | 3 | No | Dialogues | |
| 2009 | Drona | No | Dialogues | |
| 2013 | Gunde Jaari Gallanthayyinde | No | Yes | |
| 2014 | Manam | No | Dialogues | Won – Santosham Best Dialogue Award |
| 2014 | Chinnadana Nee Kosam | No | Dialogues | |
| 2016 | Thikka | No | Dialogues | |
| 2017 | Guru | No | Dialogues | |
| 2023 | Mama Mascheendra | Yes | Yes | |
| TBA | Googly † | Yes | Yes | Also composer; filming |

=== Television ===
Television performances
| Year | Title | Role | Network | Notes |
|---|---|---|---|---|
| 1997–2001 | Ruthuragalu | Harish | DD Saptagiri | |
| 2003–2007 | Amrutham | Icchapurapu Amrutha Rao | Gemini TV | Also writer and director |
| | Kasturi | | Star Maa | |
| 2000–2001 | Santhi Nivasam | | ETV | |
| | Aalu Baalu | Banginapalli Bala Murali Krishna | | |
| 2020–2021 | Amrutham Dhvitheeyam | Icchapurapu Amrutha Rao | ZEE5 | |
| 2021 | Lol Salaam | G. P. Ramakrishna | ZEE5 | |
| 2023 | Save the Tigers | Ram Mohan | Disney+ Hotstar | |
| 2024 | Miss Perfect | Gokul | Disney+ Hotstar | |
| 2025 | Touch Me Not | | JioHotstar | |
