= Nandi Award for Best Screenplay Writer =

Indian film award

The Nandi Award for Best Screenplay Writer was commissioned by the Nandi Awards committee in 1977. The winner is awarded a "Copper Nandi", a cash award of ₹10,000 and a commendation certificate.

Srinu Vaitla won the award in this category a record three times, followed by two wins each for A. Karunakaran, Singeetam Srinivasa Rao, and Neelakanta.

== Winners ==
Year	Writer	Film	Ref.
1978	Modukuri Johnson	Karunamayudu	
1979	B. Narsing Rao; Pran Rao	Maa Bhoomi	
1980	Ch. Bhava Narayana	Sri Vasavi Kanyaka Parameswari Mahatyam	
1981	K. Viswanath	Saptapadi	
1982	K. Balachander	Kokilamma	
1983	T. Krishna	Neti Bharatam	
1984	Relangi Narasimha Rao; Adi Vishnu	Sundari Subbarao	
1985	Singeetam Srinivasa Rao	Mayuri	
1986	Kranthi Kumar	Sravana Meghalu	
1987	C. S. Rao	Kanchadevayaani	
1988	U. Visweswar Rao	Pellila Chadarangam	
1989	Satyanand	Adavilo Abhimanyudu	
1990	A. Raghurami reddy	Hrudayanjali	
1991	Ram Gopal Varma	Kshana Kshanam	
1992	Singeetam Srinivasa Rao	Brundavanam	
1993	Gollapudi Maruthi Rao	Prema Pustakam	
1994	Bharath	Tapassu	
1995	Gunasekhar	Sogasu Chuda Taramaa?	
1996	Gangaraju Gunnam	Little Soldiers	
1997	Bhupati Raja	Master	
1998	A. Karunakaran	Tholi Prema	
1999	Sreenu Vaitla	Nee Kosam	
2000	G. Ramprasad	Chiru Navvutho	
2001	Neelakanta	Show	
2002	Muppalaneni Shiva	Nee Premakai	
2003	Neelakanta	Missamma	
2004	Sukumar	Arya	
2005	Chandra Sekhar Yeleti	Anukokunda Oka Roju	
2006	Bhaskar	Bommarillu	
2007	Srinu Vaitla	Dhee	
2008	A. Karunakaran	Ullasamga Utsahamga	
2009	Vikram Sirikonda; Deepak Raj	Konchem Ishtam Konchem Kashtam	
2010	Gautham Vasudev Menon	Ye Maaya Chesave	
2011	Srinu Vaitla	Dookudu	
2012	S. S. Rajamouli	Eega	
2013	Merlapaka Gandhi	Venkatadri Express	
2014	A. S. Ravikumar Chowdary	Pilla Nuvvu Leni Jeevitham	
2015	Kishore Tirumala	Nenu Sailaja	
2016	Adivi Sesh; Ravikanth Perepu	Kshanam	

=== Most won ===
Most won
Artist	Wins
Srinu Vaitla	3
A. Karunakaran	2
Singeetham Srinivasa Rao	2
Neelakanta	2

== See also ==
- Cinema of Andhra Pradesh
- Nandi Awards
