= Amrutham Dhvitheeyam =

Indian sitcom web series

- Genre: Comedy
- Created by: Gunnam Gangaraju
- Inspired by: Amrutham
- Written by: Trisul Mahesh; Vasu Inturi
- Directed by: Gunnam Sandeep
- Starring: Harsha Vardhan; L. B. Sriram; Vasu Inturi; Sivannarayana Naripeddi; Ragini; Satya Krishnan
- Theme music composer: Kalyan Malik
- Opening theme: Orey Anjeneyulu
- Country of origin: India
- Original language: Telugu
- No. of seasons: 1
- No. of episodes: 26

Production
- Producer: Gunnam Urmila
- Production locations: Telangana, India; Andhra Pradesh, India
- Cinematography: Eshwar Bhaskarla; Mitesh Parvataneni
- Editors: G. V. Chandrashekhar; Chalichimala Siva
- Camera setup: Multi-camera
- Running time: 25-35 minutes
- Production company: LightBox

Original release
- Network: ZEE5
- Release: 25 March 2020 – 25 March 2021

Related
- Amrutham

Amrutham Dhvitheeyam (lit. 'Elixir the Second') is an Indian Telugu-language sitcom web television series created by Gunnam Gangaraju and directed by Gunnam Sandeep. It is a standalone sequel to the television sitcom Amrutham (2001–2007). It was released with the tagline "Moorkhatvaniki maranam raadu" (lit. 'Stupidity never dies'). The series featured Harsha Vardhan, L. B. Sriram, Satya Krishnan, Vasu Inturi, Sivannarayana Naripeddi and Ragini in the main roles. It premiered on ZEE5 on 25 March 2020 and ended on 25 March 2021.

== Overall synopsis ==
Amrutham, along with his friend, Anji, runs a restaurant named Amrutha Vilas, which is legally owned by Appaji, who is the owner of their rental house and is someone they despise. The two friends go through ups and downs as they follow Anji's business schemes.

== Cast ==
=== Main ===
- Harsha Vardhan as Icchapurapu Ksheera Sagara Panchamrutha Rao "Amrutham"
- L. B. Sriram as Amudala Anjaneyulu "Anji"
- Sivannarayana as Gongali Appaji
- Vasu Inturi as Sarveswaran "Sarvam"
- Ragini as Shanta, Anji's wife
- Satya Krishnan as Sanjeevani "Sanju", Amrutham's wife
- Kasi Viswanath as Parandhamayya, Amrutham's father-in-law
- Raghava as Rubber Balaji, Amrutham's cousin

=== Recurring ===
- Aanamolu Surya Teja as Jootha Manager
- Sanjay Reddy as Venture Capalist
- Gajula Sandeep as Assistant
- Getup Srinu
- Chandrasekar Azad
- Pappu
- Rajashree as food blogger
- Muralikrishnam Raju
- Koduru Subrahmanyam
- Masthan
- Madhulika
- Prasad
- Sai Kiran Yadav
- Kathri Yogi
- N. Sridhar Reddy
- Naveen
- Jabardasth Sunny
- Auto Ram Prasad
- Abhishek Maharshi
- Kovvuri Srinivas Reddy
- Ansala
- Nekkanti Madhu
- Edidha Sai Kiran
- Surya
- Gunnam Ayathi
- Tanishq
- Riteish
- Bhanu
- Gunnam Vibha
- Thagubothu Ramesh
- Hari Babu
- Satyam Annamareddy
- Sankara Mahanthi
- Priyadarsini as Sanjeevan's mother

== Production ==
=== Development ===
The first season Amrutham was highly rated and was one of the most viewed television sitcoms of Indian television of the time. Due to its immense popularity the series was re-telecasted on ETV Plus from 2016 to 2018. Even during its re-telecast, the series got decent viewership. Gunnam Sandeep, then decided to direct the sequel to the series in 2018 with new stories but with the same concept.

=== Casting ===
Harsha Vardhan, Ragini, Vasu Inturi and Sivannarayana Naripeddi are the only actors who reprised their roles. Due to the death of Gundu Hanumantha Rao, his role was replaced by L. B. Sriram. Satya Krishnan and Kasi Viswanath were chosen for the main roles. Kasi Viswanath replaced senior actor Devadas Kanakala who played the role of Amrutham's father in-law.

=== Principal photography ===
The series was finally announced in late 2019. Essel Group has announced that it is going to produce along with Gunnam Urmila and release it on ZEE5. First three episodes were filmed in the early 2020. Due to COVID-19 pandemic, filming was paused until August. Next two episodes were shot digitally and were marketed as lockdown specials. Filming was resumed in August 2020. Majority of the scenes were shot at Annapurna Studios and Ramanaidu Studios in Hyderabad.

== Music ==
Title track is composed by Kalyan Malik and the background score is by Ajay Arasada.

Telugu (Original Sound Track)
No.	Title	Lyrics	Music	Length
1.	"Title Track (Orey Anjeneyulu)"	Sirivennela Seetharama Sastry	Kalyan Malik	2:49
Total length:				2:49

== Episodes ==
No.	Title	Directed by	Written by	Original release date
1	"The Beginning of Amrutha Vilas"	Sandeep Gunnam	Trisul Mahesh & Vasu Inturi	25 March 2020
2	"When Failure Becomes Friend"	Sandeep Gunnam	Trisul Mahesh & Vasu Inturi	25 March 2020
3	"The Angel in Disguise"	Sandeep Gunnam	Trisul Mahesh & Vasu Inturi	25 April 2020
4	"Lockdown Special Part-I"	Sandeep Gunnam	Trisul Mahesh & Vasu Inturi	25 April 2020
5	"Lockdown Special Part-II"	Sandeep Gunnam	Trisul Mahesh & Vasu Inturi	25 May 2020
6	"Mosquito Bite"	Sandeep Gunnam	Trisul Mahesh & Vasu Inturi	25 May 2020
7	"Kitty Party"	Sandeep Gunnam	Trisul Mahesh & Vasu Inturi	25 June 2020
8	"The Booksellers!"	Sandeep Gunnam	Trisul Mahesh & Vasu Inturi	25 June 2020
9	"Sick Sock-Mind Block"	Sandeep Gunnam	Trisul Mahesh & Vasu Inturi	25 July 2020
10	"Crazy Chef's Tasty Menu"	Sandeep Gunnam	Trisul Mahesh & Vasu Inturi	25 July 2020
11	"Final Destination"	Sandeep Gunnam	Trisul Mahesh & Vasu Inturi	25 August 2020
12	"Krishnastami"	Sandeep Gunnam	Trisul Mahesh & Vasu Inturi	25 August 2020
13	"Door Delivery"	Sandeep Gunnam	Trisul Mahesh & Vasu Inturi	25 September 2020
14	"Varieties of Leaves"	Sandeep Gunnam	Trisul Mahesh & Vasu Inturi	25 September 2020
15	"The Colourful Dream"	Sandeep Gunnam	Trisul Mahesh & Vasu Inturi	25 October 2020
16	"Rummy and Fireworks"	Sandeep Gunnam	Trisul Mahesh & Vasu Inturi	25 October 2020
17	"Monstrous Stew Part-I"	Sandeep Gunnam	Trisul Mahesh & Vasu Inturi	25 November 2020
18	"Monstrous Stew Part-II"	Sandeep Gunnam	Trisul Mahesh & Vasu Inturi	25 November 2020
19	"Happy New Year"	Sandeep Gunnam	Trisul Mahesh & Vasu Inturi	25 December 2020
20	"Festival Rooster"	Sandeep Gunnam	Trisul Mahesh & Vasu Inturi	25 December 2020
21	"A Happy, Flying Birthday Cake"	Sandeep Gunnam	Trisul Mahesh & Vasu Inturi	25 January 2021
22	"Gravity of Fish Curry"	Sandeep Gunnam	Trisul Mahesh & Vasu Inturi	25 January 2021
23	"Two Cooks Spoil the Broth"	Sandeep Gunnam	Trisul Mahesh & Vasu Inturi	25 February 2021
24	"Uma Devi’s Wedding Festivities"	Sandeep Gunnam	Trisul Mahesh & Vasu Inturi	25 February 2021
25	"Amrutha Vilas, a reality show set?"	Sandeep Gunnam	Trisul Mahesh & Vasu Inturi	25 March 2021
26	"Appaji in the house!"	Sandeep Gunnam	Trisul Mahesh & Vasu Inturi	25 March 2021

== Release ==
The official trailer of the series was released on 12 March 2020 announcing that it will be premiered from 25 March 2020 on ZEE5. The trailer was released by noted director S. S. Rajamouli.

== Reception ==
IndiaGlitz wrote that "The new avatar of 'Amrutham' makes for an enjoyable ride. The characters retain their quintessential qualities and the actors showcase their performative skills with ease. The vibe is nostalgic."
