= Sound Party (2023 film) =

Indian film

- Directed by: Sanjay Sheri
- Written by: Sanjay Sheri
- Produced by: Poli Ravi; Mahendra Gajendra; Sri Shyam Gajendra
- Starring: VJ Sunny; Hrithika Srinivas; Sivannarayana
- Cinematography: Srinivas J Reddy
- Edited by: Avinash G
- Music by: Madeen
- Production company: Blue Moon Media
- Release date: 24 November 2023
- Country: India
- Language: Telugu

Sound Party is a 2023 Indian Telugu-language comedy written and directed by Sanjay Sheri and produced by Poli Ravi, Mahendra Gajendra and Sri Shyam Gajendra under the banner Blue Moon Mediia Productions. The film stars VJ Sunny in the lead alongside Hrithika Srinivas and Sivannarayana.

== Synopsis ==
A dimwitted unemployed father-son duo embarks on a quest for wealth, launching an eccentric family-run restaurant. But their dreams unravel when their eatery is shuttered illegally, leading to a series of chaotic comical events, including unwittingly yielding control of their lives to a local criminal MLA. Framed for a crime they didn't commit but unknowingly admit to, the two find themselves serving a death sentence amid the prison's perils. The son's valiant efforts to expose truths and save his family add layers of humour and heart, delving into themes of avarice and the bonds that endure.

== Cast ==
- VJ Sunny as Raghava aka Dollar Kumar
- Hrithika Srinivas as Siri
- Sivannarayana as Kuber Kumar, Raghava's father
- Mamilla Shailaja Priya as Dhanalakshmi, Raghava's mother
- Ali as Albert Pitchcock
- Saptagiri as Jailer Rajasekhar
- Prudhvi Raj as MLA Varaprasad
- Ashok Kumar as Raghava's uncle
- Vasu Inturi as Bitcoin Exchange Officer
- Premsagar Rajulapati as Siri's father
- Manik Reddy as Bhai
- Chalaki Chanti as Hotel Customer
- Pingpong Surya as Albert's assistant
- Gemini Suresh
- Kadambari Kiran
- Vennela Kishore (voiceover)

== Release and reception ==
The film was released in theatres on 24 November 2023 and received mixed reviews from critics who felt that the film was good in bits and pieces.

A critic from Deccan Chronicle wrote that "Despite the entertainment quotient, 'Sound Party' falls short of what could have been a comprehensive entertainment experience due to its lacklustre screenplay in a few places. While humorous dialogues featuring Sunny and Shivannarayana manage to elicit a few laughs, they alone are insufficient to salvage the overall viewing experience". A critic from Times Now wrote that "In the uproarious comedy Sound Party, a father-son duo dives into the restaurant business, seeking quick riches but landing in legal troubles. Directed by Sanjay Sheri, the dynamic cast, led by VJ Sunny and Hrithika Srinivas, creates a hilarious ensemble". A critic from OTTplay wrote that "On the whole, Sound Party is a comedy caper that has impressive performances by VJ Sunny and Shivannarayana. Although the film starts on a dull note and has a very predictable storyline, the fun factor keeps the audience engaged". A critic from The Hans India wrote that "On the whole, Sanjay manages to come up with several entertaining bits, but the shoddy screenplay and the predictable nature of the plot make the film less enjoyable".
