= Lol Salaam =

2021 Indian web series

- Genre: Comedy; Adventure
- Created by: Naani Bandreddi
- Screenplay by: Praneeth Prattipati (dialogues also)
- Story by: Arjun-Carthyk (dialogues also)
- Starring: Ajju Bharadwaj; Kivish Kautilya; Pavan Kumar Alluri
- Composer: Ajay Arasada
- Country of origin: India
- Original language: Telugu
- No. of seasons: 1
- No. of episodes: 6

Production
- Executive producer: Sheshadri Muntha
- Producer: Ram
- Cinematography: Rakesh S. Narayan
- Editor: Venkata Krishna Chikkala
- Running time: 27–30 minutes
- Production company: Dope Telugu Studios

Original release
- Network: ZEE5
- Release: 25 June 2021

Lol Salaam (stylized as LOL Salaam) is an Indian Telugu-language adventure comedy web series created and directed by Naani. The series has an ensemble cast of Ajju Bharadwaj, Vasu Inturi, Harsha Vardhan, Darahas Maturu, Kivish Kautilya, Srinivas Ramireddy and Rohit Krishna Varma. It premiered on 25 June 2021 on ZEE5.

== Synopsis ==
Five friends John, Reddy, Naidu and Khan go on a short trip to a nearby waterfalls in the forest, along with their middle-aged Babai (English: Uncle). Soon, their car breaks down near the forest. Then they decide to go by-walk. As they go through the forest, Reddy ends up stepping on a landmine which was rooted in the land by a Naxalite group. The story follows on how the group of friends rescued and save their trapped buddy Reddy.

== Cast ==
- Ajju Bharadwaj as John
- Vasu Inturi as John's father; a pastor in the church
- Harsha Vardhan as MLA G. P. Ramakrishna
- Darahas Maturu as Naidu
- Kivish Kautilya as Reddy
- Rohit Krishna Varma as Varma
- Pavan Kumar Alluri as Babai
- Aishwarya Bala as Aishwarya
- Padmini Settam as Sahasya
- Srinivas Reddy Ramireddy as Khan
- Gayathri Dolly as Swarna
- Praveena Laxmi as Supraja
- Mahendraa as Krishna
- G. Appalaraju Personal Assistant of MLA
- Ansari
- Bhaskaran
- Gopal Bhati
- K. Ram Mohan
- Suresh Peddapalli
- Maniraj Marka
- Jagadam Naveen
- Sai Chand

== Episodes ==
Episode	Title	Directed by	Written by	Date of Broadcast
1	"The Beginning"	Naani	Praneeth Prattipati; Arjun-Carthyk	June 25, 2021
2	"The Wrong Step"	Naani	Praneeth Prattipati; Arjun-Carthyk	June 25, 2021
3	"The L-Spot"	Naani	Praneeth Prattipati; Arjun-Carthyk	June 25, 2021
4	"A Friend in Need"	Naani	Praneeth Prattipati; Arjun-Carthyk	June 25, 2021
5	"All For One"	Naani	Praneeth Prattipati; Arjun-Carthyk	June 25, 2021
6	"The Last Step"	Naani	Praneeth Prattipati; Arjun-Carthyk	June 25, 2021

== Soundtrack ==
All music is composed by Ajay Arasada.

Telugu (OST)
No.	Title	Lyrics	Singer(s)	Length
1.	"LOL Salaam"	Sri Mani	Sagar	3:13
Total length:				3:13

== Reception ==
The series received generally favorable reviews with the actors' performances being praised and positive response from audiences, mainly Telugu Youth.

A critic from Snooper Scope quoted it as "A thoroughly riotous entertainer exploring a social angle which can be enjoyed except for few loopholes in the latter episodes and spoilers in the form of cuss words. On the whole, Lol Salaam provides wholesome entertainment with refreshing performances that was enjoyable. The creator and director Naani deserve all the bouquets for his brilliant interpretation and presentation of a novel concept admirably on the screen."

Another critic, writing to Binged said that "It is a series made on a wafer-thin storyline. However, the director manages to keep things exciting with the writing and the ‘collective’ timing of the actors." and added that "There is very little in it story-wise. Still, one is engaged in the narrative primarily because of the writing and the timing. The five guys play off each other superbly, and the punches are quick and fast without any drag. The way it’s executed in a trendy (urban realism) way deserves special mention." "

Karthik Keramulu of Film Companion stated "LOL Salaam is a comedy that can be consumed in bits and pieces" and added that LOL Salaam may come across as a slightly better show.

Another critic, writing to LetsOTT said that "LOL Salaam is a starts off as a comedy caper as gang of 6 men land neck-deep in trouble and it switches templates in a rather hurried manner and quoted The comedy generated through the hardships faced by the lead characters is the major highlight."

Sathvik of Xappie stated "LOL Salaam is partly an entertaining series with fine performances from the up-and-coming lead cast. It will make for an okayish one-time-watch."
