= Rendu Rellu Aaru (TV series) =

Indian TV series

- Genre: Drama; Comedy; Romance; Family
- Written by: Giridhar; Vasu Inturi; Dialogues; Kakumani Suresh
- Screenplay by: Vasu Inturi; Srinath chandrasekhar
- Directed by: Vasu Inturi
- Starring: Sadhana; Renuka; Priyanka; Jaya Harika; Madhubabu; Krishna Reddy; Rajashri Nair
- Country of origin: India
- Original language: Telugu
- No. of seasons: 1
- No. of episodes: 491

Production
- Producer: Laxmi Inturi
- Cinematography: Meera
- Editor: Akhilesh Aareti
- Camera setup: Multi camera
- Running time: 20-22 minutes
- Production company: Inturi Innovations

Original release
- Network: Gemini TV
- Release: 12 November 2018 – 13 November 2020

Rendu Rellu Aaru was an Indian Telugu romantic comedy soap opera directed by Vasu Inturi aired on Gemini TV from 12 November 2018 to 13 November 2020 every Monday to Saturday for 491 episodes. The serial starred Sadhana, Renuka Jaya Harika, Priyanka, Madhubabu, Krishna Reddy as main protagonists and Rajashri Nair, Vasu Inturi, Ragini, Ramjagan in pivotal roles.

== Plot ==
Rendu Rellu Aaru is an amusing story about two young married women, Chitra and Krishna who decide to swap bodies for a brief time, in order to resolve their problems.

== Cast ==
=== Main cast ===
- Renuka as Chitra
- Sadhana /Priyanka as Krishnaveni (krishna), Chitra's best friend and journalist and Nandu
- Madhu babu as Arjun
- Krishna Reddy as Radhakrishna
- Jaya Harika as Gopika, Obul Reddy's raised daughter and Agricultural scientist
- Rajashri Nair as Bhanumathi (Arjun and Madhumathi's mother)
- ----- as Murali

=== supporting cast ===
- Vasu Inturi as Obul Reddy (Gopika's foster father and Scientist)
- Ramjagan as Siddharth Varma (Siddhu), Radha's father
- Ragini as Madhu/Radha's mother
- Bhargavi as Jayanthi (Nandu's mother)
- Prudhvi as Yamadharma Raju
- Tagubothu Ramesh
- Gopal Krishna Akella as Chitragupta
- Shashank as Sankarabharanam, cook in siddhu's house
- Krishna Sri as Subhadra/Krishna's mother
- Sumana Sri as Janaki/Chitra's mother
- Sandeepthi as Madhumathi, Arjun's sister
- Surya Teja as Chandra Rao, Indumathi husband
- Prathyusha as Indumathi, Bhanumathi's sister
- Ajay as Muralidhar Rao aka Murali Mohan, Bhanumathi's husband
- Sriragh as Sriragh, Chitra's teacher
- Visweswar Rao as priest

=== Former cast ===
- Bhanusri as Krishna (replaced by Sadhana)
- Anchor Chandu as Radha Krishna (replaced by Krishna Reddy)
- Shyam Kumar as Arjun (replaced by Madhu babu)
- Priyaawasty as Indumathi (replaced by Pratyusha)

== Airing history ==
The serial started airing on Gemini TV on 12 November 2018. It aired on Monday to Friday. The serial ended on 13 November 2020 after airing 491 episodes.
