= Vasu Inturi =

Telugu comedian

- Born: Inturi Srinivasa Rao
- Occupations: Actor; writer
- Years active: 2002–present

Inturi Srinivasa Rao, better known as Vasu Inturi, is an Indian actor and writer who works in Telugu films and television. He is known for the role of Sarvam in the TV sitcom Amrutham, which won him Nandi TV Award for Best Comedian in 2007. Inturi also worked as an assistant director and director on the series and wrote some episodes. Later, he wrote and directed the TV series Gangatho Rambabu. In 2014, he co-wrote Amrutham Chandamamalo with Gangaraju Gunnam.

== Filmography ==
Year	Title	Role	Notes
2005	Anukokunda Oka Roju		
2008	Ashta Chamma	Ranga	
2008	John Appa Rao 40 Plus		
2011	Poison		
2011	Golconda High School		
2011	Pilla Zamindar	PJ's tuition teacher	
2013	Sahasam	Goutham's friend	
2014	Amrutham Chandamamalo	Sarvam	
2014	A Shyam Gopal Varma Film		
2015	Courier Boy Kalyan	Ward boy	
2016	Rojulu Marayi	Vibhoothi	
2018	Krishnarjuna Yudham	NGO Member	
2018	Chalo		
2019	NTR: Kathanayakudu	T. Prakash Rao	
2020	Eureka	College Lecturer Lambu	
2021	Raja Raja Chora	Madhav	
2022	F3	Honey's driver	
2023	Waltair Veerayya	Priest	
2023	Sound Party	Bitcoin Exchange Officer	
2024	Happy Ending	Ramachandar	
2024	Vyuham		
2024	Shapatham		
2024	Alanaati Ramchandrudu	Photographer	
2024	Veeranjaneyulu Viharayatra	Putta Swami	
2024	Swag	Daveedu	
2025	Daaku Maharaaj	Constable	
2025	Ramam Raghavam	Bunk Mohan	
2025	Dilruba		
2025	Sundarakanda		
2025	Mithra Mandali	Abhi’s father	
2026	Son Of	Anand’s uncle	
2026	Raakaasa	SI Narasimha Rao	
2026	Gaayapadda Simham	Dharahas’s father	
2026	Don't Trouble the Trouble	Dr. Dinesh	
2026	Aakasamlo Oka Tara	College Broker	

=== Television ===
Year	Title	Role	Network	Notes
2001–2007	Amrutham	Sarveswaran "Sarvam"	Gemini TV	
2011–2014	Gangatho Rambabu		Zee Telugu	Director
2016–2018	Saradaga Kasepu	Bellam Bhaskar		
2018–2020	Rendu Rellu Aaru	Obul Reddy (Scientist)	Gemini TV	Also producer
2020	Locked	Sivalingam	Aha	
2020–2021	Amrutham Dhvitheeyam	Sarveswaran "Sarvam"	ZEE5	Also writer
2021	Lol Salaam	John's father	ZEE5	
2021	Tharagathi Gadhi Daati	Father of Krishna	Aha	
2021–2022	Muthyamantha Muddu	Narasimha	Zee Telugu	
2023	Seethe Ramudi Katnam		Zee Telugu	
2023	Kumari Srimathi	Advocate Thimmayya	Amazon Prime Video	
2023–2024	Arthamainda Arun Kumar	Kaka	Aha	
2024	Nindu Noorella Savaasam	Yamadharmaraju	Zee Telugu	
2025	Rambo in Love	Venky	JioHotstar	
