= Chandra Sekhar Yeleti =

Indian film director (born 1973)

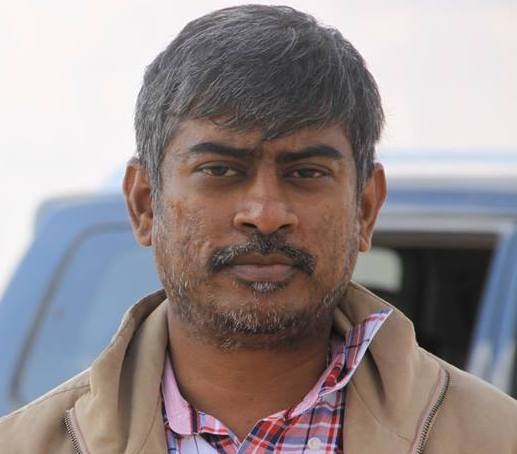
- Yeleti in 2014
- Born: Chandra Sekhar Yeleti; 4 March 1973 (age 53); Tuni, Andhra Pradesh, India
- Occupations: Film director, Screenwriter
- Years active: 2003–present
- Relatives: Gunnam Gangaraju (Cousin)

Chandra Sekhar Yeleti (born 4 March 1973) is an Indian film director known for his works in Telugu cinema. He made his directorial debut with the Neo-noir crime film, Aithe, which received the National Film Award for Best Feature Film in Telugu, and the Nandi Award for Best Story for that year. Another neo-noir film Anukokunda Oka Roju garnered two State Nandi Awards, including Best Screenplay for Yeleti.

== Early life ==
He was born in Tuni on 4 March 1973. He studied in Ganavaram St.Johns until 10th grade.

== Career ==
=== Initial years and critical acclaim ===
He worked as an assistant director under his cousin, Gangaraju Gunnam, for Little Soldiers (1996). He also directed the first 10 episodes of the cult Telugu TV series, Amrutham.

After working as an assistant director, he made his debut as a director with the small-budgeted film, Aithe (2003). Made on a budget of about ₹1.5 crores, it opened to critical acclaim and performed well commercially, with a box-office collection of ₹6 crores. After almost two years, he directed his next film, Anukokunda Oka Roju (2005). Like his debut film, Anukokunda Oka Raju too opened to critical acclaim and performed extremely well commercially. Both the films were produced by Gunnam Gangaraju and Venkat Dega, under Just Yellow Media. Aithe and Anukokunda Oka Roju are considered to be two of the greatest Telugu films ever made.

=== Commercial fluctuations ===
After a gap of two years, he directed his third film with Gopichand as the protagonist, titled Okkadunnadu (2007). However, unlike his first two films, Okkadunnadu released to polarizing reviews upon release. Gopichand's attmept to cater to different sections of the audience was praised, however, the film underperformed at the box-office. In 2009, Yeleti directed his fourth film, Prayanam, with Manchu Manoj as the lead actor. Though the attempt to revitalize the romantic comedy genre in Telugu cinema was praised, it underperformed at the box-office as well.

After four years, he teamed up with Gopichand in the with action adventure thriller, Sahasam (2013). Unlike his previous two films, Sahasam opened to positive reviews from both the critics and audience, alike, and was commercially successful. In October 2015, Yeleti met Mohanlal and narrated a family subject to him. The script was green-lit by Mohanlal, and Yeleti started production for the Telugu drama thriller, titled Manamantha, with an ensemble supporting cast of Gautami, Viswant Duddumpudi, Nassar, Chandra Mohan, Vennela Kishore, Gollapudi Maruti Rao, Paruchuri Venkateswara Rao, Brahmaji, L. B. Sriram, and Ayappa P. Sharma. It received positive reviews from the both critics and audience, alike, upon release.

After a long gap of five years in 2021 owing to the declining commercial viability of theatrical releases during the COVID-19 pandemic, Yeleti released his seventh film, the prison drama Check, starring Nithiin, Rakul Preet Singh, and Priya Prakash Varrier. It opened to mixed reviews from both the critics and audience, alike, upon release and failed at the box-office.

== Personal life ==
He got married on 19 May. Filmmaker Gunnam Gangaraju and costume designer Rama Rajamouli are his cousins.

== Filmography ==
=== Films ===
Year	Film	Notes
2003	Aithe	Shot simultaneously in Hindi as 50 Lakh
2005	Anukokunda Oka Roju	
2007	Okkadunnadu	
2009	Prayanam	
2013	Sahasam	
2016	Manamantha	Partially reshot in Malayalam as Vismayam
2021	Check	

=== Television ===
- Amrutham (2001–2007): Directed 10 episodes

== Awards ==
National Film Awards

- National Film Award for Best Feature Film in Telugu - Aithe

Nandi Awards

- Nandi Award for Best Feature Film (Silver) - Anukokunda Oka Roju
- Nandi Award for Best Screenplay Writer - Anukokunda Oka Roju
- Nandi Award for Best Story Writer - Aithe
- Nandi Special Jury Award - Manamantha
