= Amrutham Chandamamalo =

2014 Indian Telugu-language comedy film directed by Gunnam Gangaraju

- Film poster
- Directed by: Gunnam Gangaraju
- Written by: Gunnam Gangaraju
- Produced by: Urmila Gunnam
- Starring: Srinivas Avasarala; Harish Koyalagundla; Vasu Inturi; Sivannarayana Naripeddi; Dhanya Balakrishna; Suchitra
- Cinematography: Rasool Ellore
- Edited by: Dharmendra Kakarala
- Music by: Sri Kommineni
- Production company: Just Yellow Media
- Release date: 17 May 2014
- Running time: 140 minutes
- Country: India
- Language: Telugu
- Budget: ₹7 crore

Amrutham Chandamamalo (transl. Amrutham on the moon) is a 2014 Indian Telugu-language science fiction comedy film written and directed by Gunnam Gangaraju. The film stars Srinivas Avasarala, Harish Koyalagundla, Vasu Inturi, Sivannarayana Naripeddi, Dhanya Balakrishna and Suchitra. It is based on the Amrutham sitcom with Sivannarayana and Vasu Inturi reprising their roles. Gangaraju, who produced the sitcom, also produced the film. This film is marketed as the first space comedy in Telugu cinema.

== Plot ==
The movie starts with an enthusiast Amrutham (Srinivas Avasarala) going to the Moon.

The scene shifts to Amrutham and Anji (Harish Koyalagundla) who became billionaires after about four years later. Eventually, Appaji (Sivannarayana Naripeddi) gets a huge loss through Amrutha Vilas as no one is ready to buy. He later goes to the duo for commission but he fails.

He later bumps into Chandu (Rao Ramesh) who is Appaji's nephew. He is also a worker in Rocket Travel Company or RTC (fictionalized depiction of APSRTC and TSRTC). They go to the duo who were trying to make a couple Doll Reddy (Pavani Reddy) and Sameer (Ali Reza) to wed but the Doll's father Pol Reddy (Ahuti Prasad), a factionist and his henchmen Hole Reddy, Mole Reddy, etc are not very happy with it. Appaji and Chandu gets the deal done of going to the Moon.

But as fate turns out, RTC gets shut down and all of Amrutham and Anji's money gets wasted. Appaji too gets very angry with Chandu for this incident. Later, Amrutham, Anji, their wives, Sameer and Doll Reddy lived in disguises for not getting hold of Pol. Anji says Appaji that Sameer was the son of the international terrorist Sin Laden (the fictionalized depiction of Bin Laden) who was known for bombing The Pyramids of Giza in Egypt. Later, Appaji tells Sin Laden that his son was going to wed a girl and please take him.

Later in the night, some bombs were thrown by an unknown person which makes Amrutham, Anji, their wives, Sameer and Doll Reddy live in poverty. Sameer goes missing and they have to work. Later, Sarvam (Vasu Inturi) tells that he has ₹60,000 in his bank account and their lawyer says that after RTC gets shut down, it was acquired by Ming and Lee, a Chinese space company which says that you have two options, one is for refunding the money while the other is to go to the Moon. Amrutham chooses refunding the money while Anji wants to go to the Moon.

At last, they go to the Moon which makes Amrutham and Anji's friendship weak. They start farming there. They meet a person on the moon namely Engineer (Krishna Bhagavaan). Later, they start the preparation for the wedding of Sameer and Doll with Sarvam and Appaji's daughter who were in love. But later, it was revealed that Sameer was the son of Sin Laden. Appaji, Chandu, Pol Reddy with his henchmen with Sin Laden go to space. Chaos ensues on the moon but everyone was safe.

But the priest (L. B. Sriram) unknowingly said that if they strip their clothes, they would die after 60 seconds. But after a series of chaos, they were able to go to the Earth with Appaji leaving Pol, his henchmen and Sin Laden. After reporting the capture of Sin Laden to NYPD and Egyptian National Police, Amrutham and Anji lived happily ever after as they were before.

== Cast ==
- Srinivas Avasarala as Amrutha Rao 'Ammu/Amrutham'
- Harish Koyalagundla as Anjaneyulu 'Anji'
- Vasu Inturi as Sarveswaran 'Sarvam'
- Sivannarayana Naripeddi as Appaji
- Dhanya Balakrishna as Sanjeevani 'Sanju'
- Suchitra Bandekar as Santha
- Rao Ramesh as Chandramohan 'Chandu' Appaji's nephew and Rocket Travel Company "RTC" and Ming & Lee Space Company's manager.
- Pavani Reddy as Doll Reddy, Pol Reddy's daughter
- Ali Reza as Sameer 'Sin' Laden's son
- L. B. Sriram as Priest
- Krishna Bhagavaan as Engineer
- Ahuti Prasad as Pol Reddy, a factionist

== Production ==
Director Gunnam Gangaraju, music director Sri Kommineni, and cinematographer Rasool Ellore, who previously collaborated for Little Soldiers (1996), collaborate again for this film. The film began production under the name Chandamamalo Amrutham before the name was changed to Amrutham Chandamamalo. The film contains 60 minutes of graphics made by Hyderabad-based companies Laughing Dots and ECS and was shot using a Red Epic camera.

== Soundtrack ==
The songs were composed by Shree.

No.	Title	Singer(s)	Length
1.	"Laka Laka"	Shyam, M. L. R. Karthikeyan
2.	"Moon Light Girl"	Deepu, M. L. R. Karthikeyan, Sahithi
3.	"Phata Phatasula"	Sai Srikanth
4.	"Bahuparak"	Mano
5.	"Yarukaga"	Mano
6.	"Yeruvaka Sagaro"	Sahiti
7.	"Ghalan Ghalan"	Sai Srikanth

== Reception ==
The Times of India gave the film a rating of three out of five stars and wrote that "The filmmaker has infused the plot with some skillfully constructed episodes in outer space, while still managing to retain the innocence in the humor". The Deccan Chronicle gave the film the same rating and wrote that " However, it is overall a good laugh for the whole family, especially the kids".
