= Sivannarayana Naripeddi =

Indian actor

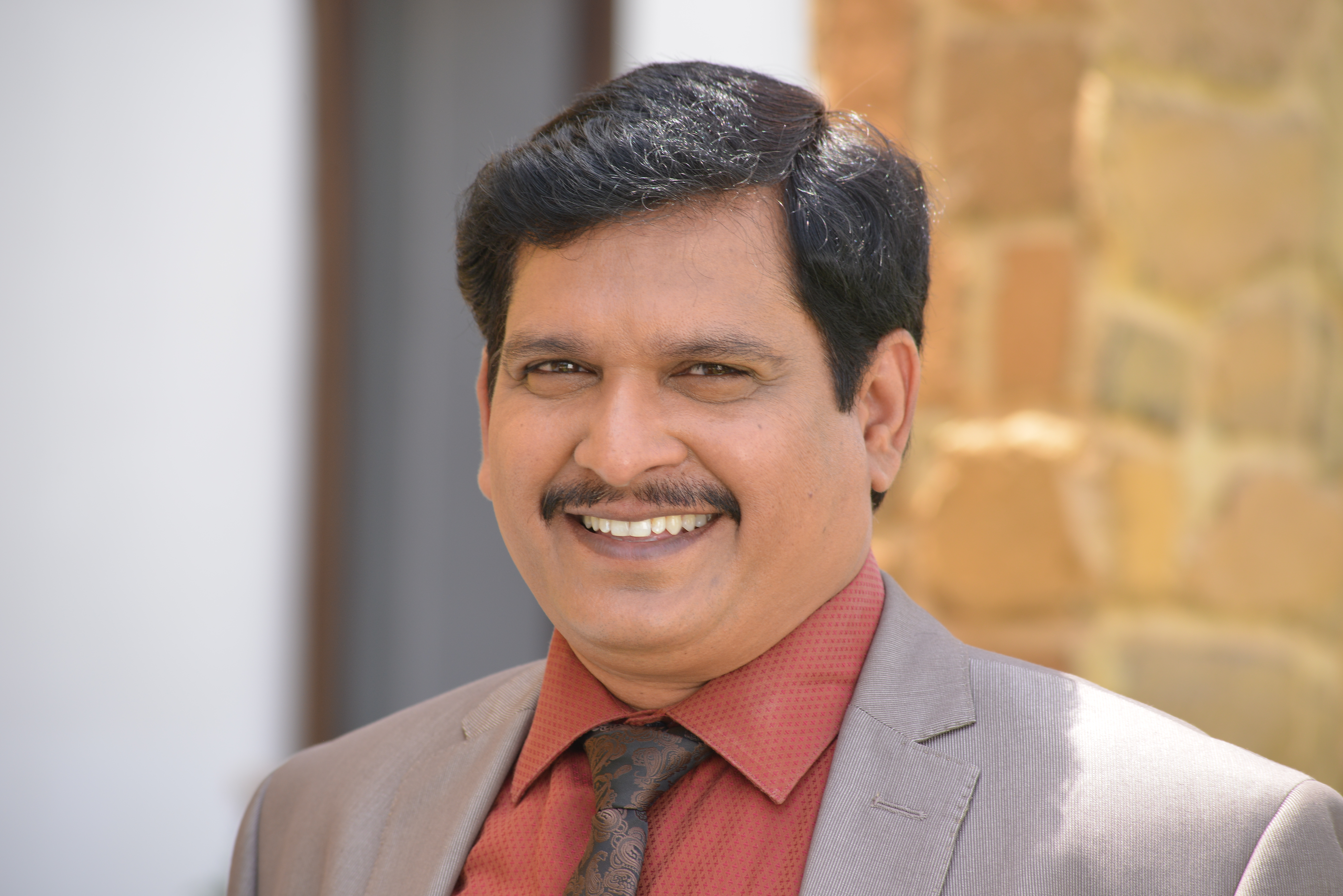
- Sivannarayana in 2013
- Born: Sivaramapuram, Andhra Pradesh, India
- Education: Hyderabad Central University
- Occupation: Actor
- Years active: 1995–present
- Spouse: Anuradha

Sivannarayana Naripeddi is an Indian actor who works in Telugu films and television. He is best known for his role as 'Appaji' in the popular Telugu TV sitcom Amrutham (2001–2007). He won the Nandi Award for Best Comedian for Ammamma.com TV show. He acted in more than 150 films including Grahanam (2004), Darling (2010), Amrutham Chandamamalo (2014).

== Early life ==
Sivannarayana was born in Sivaramapuram, Thalluru Mandal, Prakasam district of Andhra Pradesh. He completed his primary education in Sivaramapuram and Thalluru. He shifted to Hyderabad after 1980 and completed his bachelor's degree in Secunderabad. He also completed his master's degree in theatre at Hyderabad Central University. He has theater experience from his childhood. He is married to Anuradha and has two sons who have settled in London and US.

== Career ==
After completing his education he worked as an officer in BSNL. He lived in Sangareddy, Secunderabad as part of his job. During this time, he got in touch with different theater groups who perform stage dramas. Because of this stage shows, he got a chance in Amrutham TV serial. Regarding his performance in Sound Party (2023), a critic wrote that he "adds humor and wit, generating genuine laughter".

== Awards ==
- Nandi TV Award for Best Comedian for Ammamma.com

== Filmography ==
| Year | Title | Role | Notes and Ref. |
|---|---|---|---|
| 1997 | Jai Bajarangabali | Restaurant manager | |
| 1998 | All Rounder | Hindi-speaking watchman | |
| 2001 | Student No: 1 | | |
| 2002 | Kalusukovalani | Interviewer | |
| 2003 | Simhadri | | |
| 2004 | Grahanam | | |
| 2004 | Sye | Lecturer | |
| 2006 | Vikramarkudu | Wedding guest | |
| 2007 | Okkadunnadu | Doctor | |
| 2008 | Visakha Express | | |
| 2008 | John Apparao 40 Plus | | |
| 2008 | Sangamam | | |
| 2008 | Ashta Chamma | Anand's father | |
| 2008 | Yuvatha | House owner | |
| 2009 | Drona | Indu's father | |
| 2009 | Baanam | Subbalakshmi's father-in-law | |
| 2009 | Eenadu | Interrogation Room Doctor | |
| 2009 | Kurradu | Varun’s friend | |
| 2010 | Darling | Hanumanta Rao's friend | |
| 2011 | Ala Modalaindi | Nitya's uncle | |
| 2011 | Kudirithe Kappu Coffee | | |
| 2011 | Oosaravelli | Temple priest | |
| 2011 | Golconda High School | Varun’s father | |
| 2012 | Julayi | Tea Seller | |
| 2012 | Eega | Temple priest | |
| 2012 | Vennela 1½ | | |
| 2013 | Alias Janaki | Kashi | |
| 2013 | Attarintiki Daredi | Shekar's relative | |
| 2013 | Venkatadri Express | Train conductor | |
| 2014 | Emo Gurram Egaravachu | | |
| 2014 | Amrutham Chandamamalo | Appaji | |
| 2014 | Maine Pyar Kiya | Software company MD | |
| 2014 | Power | Rajesh's father | |
| 2014 | Chakkiligintha | Avi's father | |
| 2015 | Gopala Gopala | Bhanwarlal Seth | |
| 2015 | Pataas | Mahathi's brother-in-law | |
| 2015 | Yevade Subramanyam | Nandi's neighbour | |
| 2015 | Columbus | Ashwin father’s friend | |
| 2015 | Tripura | Tripura's father | |
| 2016 | Krishnashtami | | |
| 2016 | Run | Doctor | |
| 2016 | Supreme | Sridevi's paternal uncle | |
| 2016 | Raja Cheyyi Vesthe | Church father | |
| 2016 | Hyper | Rajappa's brother-in-law | |
| 2016 | A Aa | Doctor | |
| 2016 | Majnu | College principal | |
| 2017 | Jaya Janaki Nayaka | Prudhvi's father-in-law | |
| 2018 | Chalo | Mani | |
| 2018 | Vijetha | Sridhar Rao's friend | |
| 2018 | Srinivasa Kalyanam | Shekhar's father Rao | |
| 2018 | Neevevaro | Hotel Manager Krishna | |
| 2018 | Silly Fellows | Doctor | |
| 2018 | Devadas | Pooja's father | |
| 2019 | F2: Fun and Frustration | Principal Hari Reddy | |
| 2019 | 118 | Receptionist | |
| 2019 | Maharshi | Pooja's uncle | |
| 2019 | RDX Love | Doctor | |
| 2019 | Venky Mama | Apparao | |
| 2020 | Entha Manchivaadavuraa | Siva Prasad's Relative | |
| 2020 | Eureka | Principal Kanaka Raju | |
| 2021 | Red | Lawyer Appaji | |
| 2021 | 30 Rojullo Preminchadam Ela | Arjun's father | |
| 2021 | Alludu Adhurs | Pandu's father | |
| 2021 | Ninnila Ninnila | Maya's Father | |
| 2021 | Vivaha Bhojanambu | Mahesh's father | |
| 2021 | Varudu Kaavalenu | Professor | |
| 2021 | Shyam Singha Roy | Keerthi's father | |
| 2022 | Swathi Muthyam | Daniel | |
| 2022 | Boyfriend for Hire | Arjun’s father | |
| 2022 | Urvasivo Rakshasivo | Divya's father | |
| 2023 | Amigos | Ishika's father | |
| 2023 | Rangabali | College Dean | |
| 2023 | O Saathiya | College principal | |
| 2023 | Sound Party | Kuber Kumar | |
| 2023 | Extra Ordinary Man | Pooja's father | Uncredited role |
| 2024 | Bhoothaddam Bhaskar Narayana | Gangadhara Rao | |
| 2024 | Inti No. 13 | Giribabu | |
| 2024 | Rakshana | Police DCP | |
| 2024 | Alanaati Ramchandrudu | Police SI | |
| 2024 | Maruthi Nagar Subramanyam | Parthasaradhi | |
| 2024 | Dhoom Dhaam | Vittal Rao | |
| 2024 | Lucky Baskhar | Naryanan | |
| 2024 | Eagle | Venkanna | |
| 2025 | Uppu Kappurambu | Shanmukham | |
| 2025 | Junior | Doctor | Simultaneously shot in Kannada |
| 2025 | Telusu Kada | Anjali's father | |
| 2025 | K-Ramp | College HOD | |
| 2025 | Paanch Minar | Khyathi’s father | |
| 2025 | Mithra Mandali | Chaitanya's father | |
| 2026 | Nari Nari Naduma Murari | Mohan Krishna | |
| 2026 | Anaganaga Oka Raju | Raju's wedding alliance's father | |
| 2026 | Om Shanti Shanti Shantihi | Prashanthi's father | |
| 2026 | Sing Geetham | Super | |

=== Television ===
- Lady Detective (1995)
- Santhi Nivasam (2001)
- Amrutham (2001–2007)
- Ammamma.com (2007–2008)
- Nanna
- Manga Taayaru
- Radha Madhu
- Bharyamani
- Amrutham Dhvitheeyam (2020–2021)
- Devika & Danny (2025) – JioHotstar
- Katha Sudha (2025) (Segment: Sundaram Gadi Prema Katha)-ETV Win
- Super Subbu (2026) - Netflix
