= Gunnam Gangaraju =

Indian film director

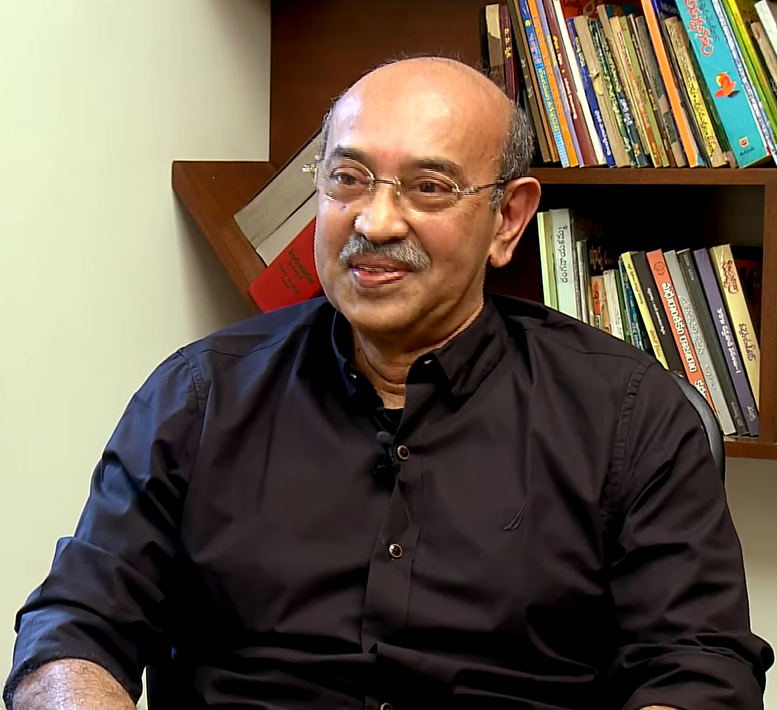
- Gangaraju in 2022
- Born: Kakinada, Andhra Pradesh, India
- Occupations: Producer, screenwriter, director
- Spouse: Urmila

Gunnam Gangaraju is an Indian producer, screenwriter, and director known for his works in Telugu cinema and Telugu television. He is best known as the creator and co-producer of the TV sitcom Amrutham (2001–2007), widely considered to be the greatest Telugu comedy TV series of all time.

He received a National Film Award for the film Aithe (2003) he produced. He also won five state Nandi Awards. His other notable works include Little Soldiers (1996), Anukokunda Oka Roju (2005), and Amma Cheppindi (2006). Along with his friend Venkat Dega, he founded the company Just Yellow, which started off as an IT services firm and later ventured into TV and film production.

== Early life ==
Gunnam Gangaraju is born and brought up in Kakinada. He is the only son to his parents and has three sisters. He was put up in a boarding school at the age of five. He studied up to sixth standard in St. Josephs Convent in Kakinada. He moved to Hyderabad along with his family at the age of ten. He received a Government of India scholarship and got into Hyderabad Public School. He finished his schooling and wanted to do medicine, but never got through. He waited for one year and joined Bachelor of Arts (BA) Literature at Andhra Loyola College in Vijayawada. But he was removed from college in the second year as the entire English medium students went for a strike. Then he completed his BA privately. He joined Master of Arts (MA) in English from Andhra University PG Centre, Kakinada.

== Career ==
=== Initial Career ===
He worked as a door to door sales representative for Navbharath Cigarettes and later passed the Probationary officers exam in State Bank of India. After spending six months at Dibrugarh and five months at Shillong, he got bored of the job, quit and came back to Hyderabad.

He started to work as a copy-writer at his friend's advertising agency. They ran it for about five years and it ended up as a loss-making venture. Then, he decided to set up his own designer studio, a studio that makes the basic designs for ad agencies, called Fountain Head Design studio, named after his favourite book. But it didn't workout. He was interested in filmmaking but could not find the time. So, he wanted to start a business that would not require much thinking and opened a Vadilal ice-cream parlour which also ended up as a failure.

Then, he borrowed ₹1,500 from a friend and started the business of greeting cards named 'Font Cards'. He priced his greeting cards at ₹ 25 per card, higher than the then market leader Hallmark Cards whose cards were priced at ₹9 per card. This business was successful.

=== Debut in film ===
Even before starting his greeting card business, Gangaraju dabbled in films. He was approached by C. L. Narasareddy, the producer of Geethanjali (1989), and Yarlagadda Surendra, the co-producer of Siva (1989), for the Telugu remake of the Malayalam film Malootty (1990), which starred Shamili in one of her first roles. Gangaraju wanted to improve upon the original and added a brother character and cast Tarun for the role. This film started before Anjali (1990) which also starred Shamili and Tarun. After shooting for about seven days, the film was shelved due to financial constraints.

When 'Font Cards' business was at high, he started the film Little Soldiers (1996) with a story he had written back in 1982 or 1984. Initially, it was supposed to be produced by someone else with Gangaraju directing it. When the producer backed out, Gangaraju himself produced the film. He said the hardest part about the film was making the three-year-old girl Kavya, the daughter of Dr. A. V. Guruva Reddy, who played one of the prominent characters in the film, to act. She dubbed in her own voice for all the scenes by learning Telugu in 3 months. As per Gangaraju, he wrote the climax booby traps sequence years before the release of Home Alone (1993). Gangaraju mentioned that he invested ₹1.06 crore on the film and recovered ₹50–60 lakh from it as advances and incurred a loss of around ₹50 lakh. He feels the film would have performed better with a different publicity strategy. He also mentioned the long shooting time as a reason for the film's losses.

=== Amrutham and beyond ===
Their first project under the 'Just Yellow' banner was Amrutham. Amrutham was a sitcom television series created and co-produced by Gunnam Gangaraju. It is widely considered to be the greatest Telugu comedy TV series of all time. The show originally aired on Gemini TV every Sunday on prime time 8 PM slot. It ran for exactly six years from 18 November 2001 to 18 November 2007 for 313 episodes.

== Other work ==
Along with his friend Venkat Dega, a doctor in Canterbury, UK, he founded the company 'Just Yellow' which started off as an IT services firm and later ventured into TV and film production. It has produced Amrutham, Aithe, Nanna, Anukokunda Oka Roju etc.

Reed launched the Telugu translation of Leonard E. Read's 1958 essay I, Pencil, the first translation of Leonard's work in the Asian subcontinent. I, Pencil was translated by Raghavendar Askani of the Swatantrata Center, Youth Parliament Program, for the promotion of liberal thought in India. Lawrence Reed praised the Vihangam Book by Gangaraju Gunnam, a noted Indian film producer and screenwriter. calling it like an Indian Ayn Rand's Atlas Shrugged, Reed has commented on the advancement of liberal thought in India, highlighting the novel Reed described Vihangam as akin to an Indian version of Ayn Rand's Atlas Shrugged, emphasizing its alignment with free-market and individualist principles.

== Personal life ==
Chandra Sekhar Yeleti, who directed Aithe (2003) and Anukokunda Oka Roju (2005), in his production, is his maternal cousin. Costume designer Rama Rajamouli is also his cousin. Rama did various small roles in Amrutham sitcom in its initial episodes. Gangaraju is also a relative of director S. S. Rajamouli. Rajamouli mentioned that he learnt about the practical aspect of filmmaking from Gangaraju.

Gangaraju is an atheist. The Fountainhead (1943) is his favourite book.

== Awards ==
National Film Awards

- Best Feature Film in Telugu - Aithe (2003)

Nandi Awards

- Second Best Feature Film - Silver - Little Soldiers (1996)
- Best Screenplay Writer - Little Soldiers (1996)
- Best Director - Little Soldiers (1996)
- Second Best Feature Film - Silver - Anukokunda Oka Roju (2005)
- Special Jury Award - Amma Cheppindi (2006)
- Nandi TV Award for Second Best Mega Serial - Amrutham (2007)

== Filmography ==
=== As writer ===
- Amrutham - Story, Dialogues (2001-2007)
- Aithe - Dialogues (2003)
- Anukokunda Oka Roju - Dialogues (2005)
- Ammamma.com - Writer, Dialogues (2007-2008)
- Laya TV Serial - Story (2008–2010)
- Katha - Dialogues (2009)
- Edureetha TV Serial - Story (2011)
- Ghazi - Screenplay, Dialogues (2017)
- Amrutham Dhvitheeyam (2020-2021) - Writer, Dialogues
- Aakasamlo Oka Tara (2026) - Screenplay

=== As director ===
- Little Soldiers (1996)
- Amma Cheppindi (2006)
- Amrutham Chandamamalo (2014)

=== As producer ===
- Little Soldiers (1996)
- Aithe (2003)
- Anukokunda Oka Roju (2005)
- Amma Cheppindi (2006)
- In a Day (2006)
- Katha (2009)

=== As art director ===
- Little Soldiers (1996)

=== Television ===
- Amrutham (2001–2007; 313 episodes)
- Nanna (2003–2004; 89 episodes)
- Radha Madhu (2006–2008; 450 episodes)
- Ammamma.com (2007–2008; 200 episodes)
- Laya (2008–2010; 321 episodes)
- Adagaka Ichina Manasu (2011; Stopped after 60 episodes)
- Edureetha (2011)
- Prathibinbam (2014–2015)
