= Swathi (magazine) =

Telugu-language weekly women's magazine

- Editor: Vemuri Balaram
- Founder: Vemuri Balaram
- First issue: 1984; 42 years ago
- Company: Swathi Publications
- Country: India
- Based in: Vijayawada
- Language: Telugu

Swathi is an Indian Telugu-language weekly women's magazine launched in 1984. It was founded by Vemuri Balaram, who also edited it. It is the largest circulated Telugu weekly magazine. It is published by Swathi Publications, which has its headquarters in Vijayawada.
