= Sye (2004 film) =

- Film poster
- Directed by: S. S. Rajamouli
- Screenplay by: S. S. Rajamouli
- Dialogues by: M. Rathnam
- Story by: V. Vijayendra Prasad
- Produced by: A. Bharati
- Starring: Nithiin; Genelia; Shashank; Pradeep Rawat
- Cinematography: K. K. Senthil Kumar
- Edited by: Kotagiri Venkateswara Rao
- Music by: M. M. Keeravani
- Production company: Sri Bharathi Enterprises
- Release date: 23 September 2004
- Running time: 163 minutes
- Country: India
- Language: Telugu
- Budget: ₹102 million
- Box office: ₹110 million distributors' share

Sye (/ˈsaɪ/; transl. 'Challenge') is a 2004 Indian Telugu-language sports action film directed by S. S. Rajamouli, who co-wrote the film with V. Vijayendra Prasad. The film is produced by A. Bharati under Sri Bharathi Enterprises. The film features Nithin, Genelia, Shashank and Pradeep Rawat. The story is set against the backdrop of rugby and follows two rival student groups in a college, one representing the Science stream and the other the Arts stream. Initially clashing for dominance through the sport, the two factions are ultimately forced to unite when a local gangster takes control of their university.

This was Rajamouli's third film post the successes of Student No: 1 and Simhadri. Music composed by M. M. Keeravani with cinematography by K. K. Senthil Kumar and editing by Kotagiri Venkateswara Rao. The film earned ₹110 million (equivalent to ₹390 million or US$4.0 million in 2023) in distributor share’s against a production budget of ₹102 million (equivalent to ₹360 million or US$3.8 million in 2023) and was commercially successful at the box office. (Note: The average exchange rate in 2004 was 45.32 Indian rupees (₹) per 1 US dollar (US$).) The film won four Nandi Awards.

The film gained recognition beyond India when Willie Hateraka, a coach of the Indian Army's rugby team and a member of the Māori community in New Zealand, recommended the film to the International Rugby Board. The Board later shortlisted Sye as one of only three films globally deemed suitable as promotional material for the sport of rugby.

== Plot ==
In a prominent co-educational college in Hyderabad, an intense and volatile rivalry exists between the student factions of the Arts and Science streams. The Arts students are led by Shashank, while the Science students are spearheaded by Pruthvi. Their animosity routinely manifests in campus brawls and turf wars over student union dominance. Indu, a vibrant student, joins the college and finds herself caught between the constant friction of the two groups, eventually developing romantic feelings for Pruthvi. To channel their aggression without administrative interference, the two factions use highly physical, informal rugby matches to settle their campus disputes.

The localized campus rivalry takes a drastic turn when Bhikshu Yadav, a ruthless, politically powerful mafia don, forcibly acquires the legal deeds to the college land. Yadav intends to demolish the institution to construct a massive commercial complex and set up an illicit hub for his criminal syndicate. When the college authorities and the management find themselves legally and physically powerless against Yadav's muscle power, the entire student body faces imminent eviction and the permanent closure of their institution.

Recognizing that their internal animosities are trivial in the face of losing their futures, Pruthvi and Shashank agree to a temporary truce. The two leaders unite the Arts and Science factions into a singular, cohesive student coalition to defend their campus. They confront Yadav, who mockingly challenges them to a high-stakes, official rugby union match. Yadav stipulates that if the college team wins, he will legally return the land deeds and vacate the property; however, if they lose, the students must permanently forfeit the campus and abandon their resistance.

On the day of the match, Yadav fields a team composed of brutal, heavily built mercenaries who play with extreme, illegal violence, severely injuring several student players in the opening halves. Trailing heavily on the scoreboard and physically battered, the students stage a resilient second-half comeback. Through seamless teamwork, tactical shifts, and sheer endurance, Pruthvi scores the decisive, game-winning try in the final seconds of the match. Infuriated by his public defeat, Yadav breaks his contract and orders his armed syndicate to launch a lethal assault on the stadium. A massive, chaotic brawl ensues, culminating in Pruthvi and the united students using their physical conditioning to overpower the mafia. Pruthvi single-handedly neutralizes Bhikshu Yadav, permanently reclaiming the college land and securing the future of the institution.

== Cast ==
- Nithiin as Prudhvi
- Shashank as Shashank
- Rajiv Kanakala as Rugby coach Rafi, Qader's son
- Pradeep Rawat as Bhikshu Yadav
- Nassar as Qadar, college property owner
- Genelia as Indu
- Chatrapathi Sekhar as Bhikshu Yadav's right hand and an advocate
- Ajay as Bhikshu Yadav's henchman
- Tanikella Bharani as Prudhvi's father and college principal
- Venu Madhav as Nalla Balu
- S. S. Kanchi as Indu's father
- Preeti Nigam as Prudhvi's mother
- Swathi Katrapati as Venni, Indu's friend and Shani's girlfriend
- Supreeth as Bhikshu Yadav's henchmen
- Madhunandan as College Student
- Sameer as ACP Aravind
- Surya as Pinganoori Panganamalu "Ping Pong"; Prudhvi's friend and classmate
- Shravan as Chotu, Shashank's friend and classmate
- Natraj Master as Spare; Prudhvi's friend
- Sivannarayana Naripeddi as a lecturer
- Narsing Yadav
- Alapati Lakshmi

Cameo appearance

- S. S. Rajamouli as Nalla Balu's henchman

== Production ==
Nithiin and other actors underwent two months of rugby training.

== Soundtrack ==
The film has six songs composed by M. M. Keeravani. The audio release function was held at the Taj Banjara hotel in Hyderabad. The song " Chantaina bujjaina " adopted from Hindi song "Duniya mein logon ko" from the film Apna desh.

Tracklist
No.	Title	Lyrics	Singer(s)	Length
1.	"Appudappudu"	M. M. Keeravani	Lucky Ali, Sumangali	4:06
2.	"Chantaina Bujjaina"	Chandrabose	Kalyani Malik, Smitha, Vasundara Das	5:27
3.	"Ganga A/C"	Chandrabose	Kalyani Malik, Ganga, Vasundara Das	5:21
4.	"Gutlovundi"	Bhuvana Chandra	Tippu, Malathi	4:31
5.	"Nalla Nallani Kalla"	Siva Shakti Datta	M. M. Keeravani, K. S. Chithra	4:10
6.	"Pantham Pantham"	Chandrabose	Devi Sri Prasad, M. M. Keeravani, Tippu, Chandrabose, Kalyani Malik, & Smitha	3:21
Total length:				26:59

== Reception ==
A critic from Sify opined that "Go ahead and enjoy and rugby game. Sye is a roller coaster ride of pure unadulterated masala". Jeevi of Idlebrain wrote, "Plus points of the film are Raja Mouli's stylish taking and MM Keeravani music. The main negative point in the film is failing in getting the emotions right till the climax of the film".

== Box office ==
The film had a successful 365-day run at one centre. It collected ₹110 million (equivalent to ₹390 million or US$4.0 million in 2023) share at box office. Sye was the most expensive film in Rajamouli's career till 2004 as it was made with over ₹100 million (equivalent to ₹350 million or US$3.7 million in 2023) budget.

== Recognition ==
In the lead up to the 2015 Rugby World Cup, a video of the rugby scenes from Sye went viral.

When Willie Hateraka, belonging to the Maori sect of New Zealand, working as the coach for Indian Army's Rugby team, saw the film Sye, was so impressed with the movie that he recommended Rajamouli's name to the International Rugby Board as the director for their proposed feature film based on rugby, which never entered production. Hateraka, who couldn't even understand English properly nor the language of the film, connected to the film emotionally. The film went on to be one of the only 3 films that the Rugby Board found suitable as promotional material for the game of Rugby.

== Awards ==
Nandi Awards

- Best Editor - Kotagiri Venkateswara Rao
- Best Male Dubbing Artist - P. Ravi Shankar
- Best Supporting Actor - Shashank
- Best Villain - Pradeep Rawat

Filmfare Awards South

- Filmfare Best Villain Award (Telugu) - Pradeep Rawat (2004)

CineMAA Awards

- Best Comedian - Venu Madhav (2004)
