= List of Telugu films of 2006 =

This is a list of films produced by the Telugu film industry based in Hyderabad in the year 2006.

== Box office ==
Highest-grossing films of 2006
Rank	Title	Studio	Distributor Share	Ref.
1	Pokiri	Indira Productions; Vaishno Academy	₹36 crores	
2	Stalin	Anjana Productions	₹28 crores	
3	Bommarillu	Sri Venkateswara Creations	₹25 crores	
4	Vikramarkudu	Sri Keerthi Creations	₹18.9 crores	

== List ==
Opening		Title	Director	Cast	Production house	Ref
J A N	11	Devadasu	YVS Chowdary	Ram, Ileana D'Cruz		
J A N	12	Style	Raghava Lawrence	Raghava Lawrence, Prabhu Deva, Raja, Charmme, Kamalini Mukherjee		
J A N	14	Chukkallo Chandrudu	Sivakumar Ananth	Siddharth Narayan, Charmme, Sada		
J A N	14	Lakshmi	V. V. Vinayak	Venkatesh Daggubati, Nayanthara, Charmy Kaur		
J A N	27	Happy	A. Karunakaran	Allu Arjun, Genelia D'Souza		
F E B	9	Shock	Harish Shankar	Ravi Teja, Jyothika		
F E B	10	Ranam	Amma Rajasekhar	Tottempudi Gopichand, Kamna Jethmalani, Biju Menon		
F E B	16	Asadhyudu	Anil Krishna	Kalyan Ram		
F E B	18	Hope	Satish Kasetty	D. Ramanaidu, Kalyani		
F E B	24	Rajababu	Muppalaneni Shiva	Rajasekhar, Brahmanandam, Kondavalasa Lakshmana Rao		
M A R	7	Pothe Poni	Tammareddy Bharadwaja	Sindhu Tolani, Siva Balaji		
M A R	10	Sambhavami Yuge Yuge	Ravi Varma	Anji, Srijana, Jack		
M A R	24	Party	Ravi Babu	Allari Naresh, Madhu Sharma, Shashank, Bramhanandam, Ravi Babu		
M A R	30	Raam	N. Shankar	Nithiin, Genelia D'Souza		
M A R	30	Sri Ramadasu	K. Raghavendra Rao	Nagarjuna, Sneha, Suman, Veda Sastry		
A P R	7	10th Class	Chandu	Bharat, Saranya, Sunaina		
A P R	14	Premante Inte	BV Ramana	Navdeep, Poonam Bajwa		
A P R	21	Pournami	Prabhu Deva	Prabhas, Trisha Krishnan, Charmme		
A P R	25	Sarada Saradaga	S. V. Krishna Reddy	Srikanth, Rajendra Prasad, Sindhu Tolani		
A P R	28	Pokiri	Puri Jagannadh	Mahesh Babu, Ileana D'Cruz, Prakash Raj		
A P R	29	Veerabhadra	A.S. Ravi Kumar	Nandamuri Balakrishna, Tanushree Dutta, Sada		
M A Y	3	Bangaram	Dharani	Pawan Kalyan, Reema Sen, Meera Chopra, Mukesh Rishi		
M A Y	4	Manodu	Priyadarshini Ram	Priyadarshini Ram, Viswendar Reddy, Radhika Joshi		
M A Y	5	Kithakithalu	E. V. V. Satyanarayana	Allari Naresh		
M A Y	12	Evandoi Srivaru	Satti Babu	Srikanth, Sneha		
M A Y	19	Godavari	Sekhar Kammula	Sumanth, Kamalinee Mukherjee		
M A Y	19	Oka V Chitram	Teja	Krishna Bhagavaan, Tanikella Bharani, Telangana Shakuntala		
M A Y	26	Sri Krishna 2006	V. Vijayendra Prasad	Srikanth, Venu, Brahmanandam		
J U N	2	Beats	A. V. V. Naidu	Vinay, Pranathi		
J U N	13	Kokila	Konda	Rajiv Kanakala, Raja, Saloni Aswani, Siva Balaji		
J U N	23	Vikramarkudu	S. S. Rajamouli	Ravi Teja, Anushka Shetty		
J U N	30	Astram	Suresh Krishna	Vishnu Manchu, Anushka Shetty, Jackie Shroff, Rahul Dev		
J U L	7	Nandanavanam 120 km	Neelakanta	Ajay, Kota Srinivasa Rao		
J U L	13	Ashok	Surender Reddy	Jr. NTR, Sameera Reddy, Prakash Raj, Sonu Sood		
J U L	21	Kittu	B. Satya	Animated Film		
J U L	21	Valliddari Vayasu Padahare	Bhanu Shankar	Tarun Chandra, Devaki		
J U L	28	Amma Cheppindi	Gangaraju Gunnam	Suhasini, Sharwanand, Shriya Reddy		
A U G	4	Game	G. Ram Prasad	Mohan Babu, Vishnu, Shobana, Parvati Melton		
A U G	4	Veedhi	V Dorairaj	Sharwanand, Gopika		
A U G	9	Bommarillu	Bhaskar	Siddharth, Genelia D'Souza, Prakash Raj, Jayasudha		
A U G	11	Roommates	AVS	Allari Naresh, Baladitya, Navneet Kaur		
A U G	11	Naayudamma	A. Madhava Sai	Vijaya Shanti, Prabhu Deva, Rekha Vedavyas		
A U G	18	Andala Ramudu	P. Lakshmi Narayana	Sunil, Aarti Agarwal		
A U G	25	Sardar Pappanna	Pratani Ramakrishna Goud	Krishna, Suman		
A U G	27	Indian Beauty	Shantikumar	Gopichand Lagadapati, Sairao, Collin Mcgee		
S E P	1	Photo	Siva Nageswara Rao	Anand, Anjali, Mukta		
S E P	2	Seetha Ramudu	Shyam Prasad	Sivaji, Ankita, Rahul Dev		
S E P	8	Maa Idhari Madhya	Ramesh Maddineni	Bharat, Vidisha, Brahmanandam		
S E P	9	Aganthakudu	Anil Kishore	Siva Balaji, Nikita Thukral, Madhu Shalini		
S E P	20	Stalin	A. R. Murugadoss	Chiranjeevi, Trisha Krishnan, Khushbu		
S E P	21	Vanaja	Rajnesh Domalpalli	Indira Amperiani, Bhaskara S. Narayanan		
S E P	27	Boss, I Love You	V. N. Aditya	Nagarjuna, Shriya saran, Nayantara, Poonam Bajwa		
O C T	12	Tata Birla Madhyalo Laila	Srinivasa Reddy	Sivaji, Krishna Bhagavaan, Ali		
O C T	19	Maayajaalam	S. V. Krishna Reddy	Srikanth, Venu Madhav, Ali		
O C T	20	Raraju	Udayasankar	Gopichand, Meera Jasmine		
O C T	20	Samanyudu	C. Ravi Kumar	Jagapati Babu		
O C T	20	Thrill	Veeru K	Venkat, Ruthika		
O C T	27	Chinnodu	Kanmani	Sumanth, Charmme		
O C T	27	Neeku Naaku	Selvendran	Sarath Chander, Rambha, Lakshmi Rai		
N O V	3	Nuvve	Gopichand	Dhanush, Samragni		
N O V	16	Bhagyalakshmi Bumper Draw	Nidhi Prasad	Rajendra Prasad		
N O V	16	Gopi – Goda Meeda Pilli	Janardhana Maharshi	Allari Naresh, Jagapathi Babu		
N O V	30	Mayabazar	Mohan Krishna Indraganti	Raja, Bhoomika Chawla, S. P. Balasubrahmanyam		
N O V	30	Sainikudu	Gunasekhar	Mahesh Babu, Irfan Khan, Trisha		
D E C	8	Aadi Lakshmi	Y. Suresh	Srikanth, Vadde Naveen		
D E C	8	Pellaina Kothalo	Madan	Jagapati Babu, Priyamani		
D E C	14	Khatarnak	Amma Rajasekhar	Ravi Teja, Ileana D'Cruz		
D E C	15	Aakhari Pagi	K. Ramana Rao	Aditya Om, Tanu Roy		
D E C	22	Rakhi	Krishna Vamsi	Jr. NTR, Charmy Kaur, Ileana D'Cruz		
D E C	23	Abhaddam	K. Balachander	Uday Kiran, Vimala Raman		
D E C	29	Annavaram	Bhimaneni Srinivasa Rao	Pawan Kalyan, Asin, Sandhya		

== See also ==
- List of Telugu films of 2005
- Lists of Telugu-language films
- List of Telugu films of 2007
