= Nandi Awards of 2001 =

Indian Telugu film and TV awards ceremony

The Nandi Awards are presented annually in Andhra Pradesh, For Telugu cinema by State government. "Nandi" means "bull", the awards being named after the big granite bull at Lepakshi — a cultural and historical symbol of Andhra Pradesh. Nandi Awards are presented in four categories: Gold, Silver, Bronze, and Copper.

== 2001 Nandi Awards Winners List ==
Category	Winner	Film
Best Feature Film	Preminchu	
Second Best Feature Film	Murari	
Third Best Feature Film	Atu America Itu India	
Best Home Viewing Feature Film	Nuvvu Naaku Nachav	
Best Film on National Integration	Padma	
Best Children Film	Little Hearts	
First Best Documentary Film	Janani	
Second Best Documentary Film	Neeru Meeru	
Best Director	Teja	Nuvvu Nenu
Best Children Film Director	Srikanth	Little Hearts
Best Actor	Nandamuri Balakrishna	Narasimha Naidu
Best Actress	Laya	Preminchu
Best Supporting Actor	Murali Mohan	Preminchu
Best Supporting Actress	Suhasini Maniratnam	Nuvvu Naaku Nachav
Best Character Actor	Tanikella Bharani	Nuvvu Nenu
Best Male Comedian	Sunil	Nuvvu Nenu
Best Female Comedian	Sri Lakshmi	Preminchu
Best Villain	Kota Srinivasa Rao	Chinna
Best Child Actor	Master Mahendra	Little Hearts
Best Child Actress	Baby Nitya	Little Hearts
Best First Film of a Director	K. N. T. Sastry	Thilaadanam
Best Screenplay Writer	Neelakanta	Show
Best Story Writer	Puri Jagannadh	Itlu Sravani Subramanyam
Best Dialogue Writer	Trivikram	Nuvvu Naaku Nachav
Best Lyricist	C. Narayana Reddy	Preminchu
Best Cinematographer	Rasool Ellore	Nuvvu Nenu
Best Music Director	R. P. Patnaik	Nuvvu Nenu
Best Male Playback Singer	M. M. Keeravani	Student No.1
Best Female Playback Singer	Usha	Padma
Best Editor	Marthand K. Venkatesh	Daddy
Best Art Director	Ashok	Daddy
Best Choreographer	Suchitra Chandrabose	Nuvvu Naaku Nachav
Best Audiographer	Kolli Rama Krishna	Wife
Best Costume Designer	Ghalib	Jabili
Best Makeup Artist	Shyam Zadcharla	Thilaadanam
Best Fight Master	Vijayan	Bhadrachalam
Best Male Dubbing Artist	Raghu	Sampangi
Best Book on Telugu Cinema	Vasiraju Prakasam	Cine Bharatam
Best Film Critic on Telugu Cinema	Mohan Goteti	Sitara Magazine
Best Female Dubbing Artist	Savitha	Nuvvu Naaku Nachav
Special Jury Award	Manjula Ghattamaneni	Show
Special Jury Award	Mahesh Babu	Murari
Special Jury Award	Surya	Show
