= Indira Productions =

Indian film production company

- Industry: Entertainment
- Founder: Manjula Ghattamaneni
- Headquarters: India
- Key people: Sanjay Swarup, Manjula Ghattamaneni
- Products: Films
- Services: Film production
- Owner: Manjula Ghattamaneni
- Parent: Padmalaya Studios
- Subsidiaries: G. Mahesh Babu Entertainment Pvt. Ltd; Krishna Productions Pvt. Ltd

Indira Productions is an Indian film production company, established by Manjula Ghattamaneni daughter of actor Krishna.

== Film production ==
No	Year	Film	Language	Actors	Director	Notes	Ref
1	2002	Show	Telugu	Manjula Ghattamaneni, Surya	Neelakanta		
2	2004	Naani	Telugu	Mahesh Babu, Amisha Patel	S .J. Suryaah		
3	2006	Pokiri	Telugu	Mahesh Babu, Ileana D'Cruz	Puri Jagannadh	Co production along with Vaishno Academy	
4	2009	Kavya's Diary	Telugu	Manjula Ghattamaneni, Charmy Kaur, Shashank, Indrajith	V.K.Prakash		
5	2010	Ye Maaya Chesave	Telugu	Naga Chaitanya, Samantha Ruth Prabhu	Gautham Vasudev Menon		
6	2018	Manasuku Nachindi	Telugu	Sundeep Kishan, Amyra Dastur	Manjula Ghattamaneni	Co production along with Anandi Art Creations	

== Awards ==
S.no	Ceremony	Year	Category	Nominee	Result
1	National Film Awards	2003	Best Feature Film Telugu	Show	Won
2	Nandi Awards	2006	Nandi Award for Best Popular Feature Film	Pokiri	Won
