= Anandi Art Creations =

Indian film production company

- Industry: Entertainment
- Headquarters: India
- Area served: India
- Products: Films

Anandi Art Creations is an Indian film production company . Producer of this production house is P. Kiran & he also won two Filmfare Awards

== Film production ==
No	Year	Film	Language	Actors	Director	Notes
1	1998	Antahpuram	Telugu	Jagapati Babu, Soundarya, Prakash Raj, Sai Kumar	Krishna Vamsi	Won: Filmfare Award for Best Film - Telugu
2	2001	Nuvvu Nenu	Telugu	Uday Kiran, Anita	Teja	Won: Filmfare Award for Best Film - Telugu
3	2002	Avunu Valliddaru Ista Paddaru!	Telugu	Raviteja, Kaveri	Vamsy	Presenter of this film
4	2003	Ammayilu Abbayilu	Telugu	Vijay, Mohit, Sonu Sood, Devina, Vidya and Swapna Madhuri	Ravi Babu	
5	2003	Okariki Okaru	Telugu	Sriram, Aarthi Chhabria	Rasool Ellore	The film was dubbed in Tamil as Unnai Paartha Naal Mudhal
6	2009	Kurradu	Telugu	Varun Sandesh, Neha Sharma	Sandeep Gunnam	
7	2013	Venkatadri Express	Telugu	Sundeep Kishan, Rakul Preet Singh	Merlapaka Gandhi	
8	2015	Beeruva	Telugu	Sundeep Kishan, Surabhi	Kanmani	Co-Production with Ushakiran Movies
9	2016	Majnu	Telugu	Nani, Anu Emmanuel, Priya Shri	Virinchi Varma	Co-Production with Keva Movies
10	2018	Manasuku Nachindi	Telugu	Sundeep Kishan, Amyra Dastur, Tridha Choudhury, Adith Arun	Manjula Ghattamaneni	Co-Production with Indira Productions
11	2021	Vivaha Bhojanambu	Telugu	Satya, Sundeep Kishan, Aarjavee	Ram Abbaraju	Co-Production with Soldiers Factory and Venkatadri Express
12	2023	Ahimsa	Telugu	Abhiram Daggubati, Geethika Tiwary, Rajat Bedi, Sadha	Teja	
13	2025	Champion	Telugu	Roshan Meka, Anaswara Rajan	Pradeep Advaitham	Co-Production with Zee Studios and Swapna Cinema
14	2026	Srinivasa Mangapuram †	Telugu	Jaya Krishna, Rasha Thadani	Ajay Bhupathi	Co-production with Vyjayanthi Movies
