= Priyadarshini Ram =

Indian actor

- Born: 24 October 1955 (age 71); Tenali, Guntur district, Andhra Pradesh, India
- Occupations: director, screenWriter, Actor, Producer
- Children: 2

Pathi Lakshmi Ram Reddy, also known professionally as Priyadarshini Ram, is an Indian advertising executive, actor, and Telugu filmmaker. He won the Nandi Special Jury Award for Manodu (2006) for his directorial making of the film.

== Early life ==
Although Ram was born in Tenali, he was educated in Bhilai, Delhi and Hyderabad, Andhra Pradesh. He graduated from Nizam College in 1980 and then received admission to Jamnalal Bajaj Institute of Management Studies. Unfortunately, his father died at the age of 13, so he could not pursue the course since he had to stay with his mother.

== Career ==
Ram wrote a lot during his college days. His inclination towards creative writing got him into the field of advertising. He got a major break when he got an assignment to do advertising campaigns nationwide for acclaimed national political leaders in various languages.

His company received an acquisition offer by multinational advertising agency Grey America. They could not accept it because they wanted to move the firm to Mumbai. He could not go because he had to support his mother. Ram lost out on opportunities because he preferred to work in Hyderabad and the advertising capital of India had always been Mumbai.

He emerged as a filmmaker with Manodu and then with Toss in Telugu cinema. He appeared on screen in Toss during a dance sequence with Raja. He appeared in a guest appearance in the film Missamma directed by Neelakanta. He did voice for Upendra in Toss.

== Filmography ==
Year	Title	Role	Notes
2003	Missamma		Special appearance
2006	Manodu	Ravi	Won – Nandi Special Jury Award
2007	Toss		Also director; special appearance
2015	Bengal Tiger		
2015	Jyothi Lakshmi	Police Officer	
2018	Idam Jagath	Rajeev	
2019	Vinaya Vidheya Rama	Encounter Specialist	
2019	Marshal	Abhi’s father	
2021	Shaadi Mubarak		
2023	Ranga Maarthaanda		
2023	Newsense		aha series; as writer
2026	ENE Repeat	Muralidhar	
