= Vivaha Bhojanambu =

Vivaha Bhojanambu (lit. 'vivaha bhojana' or 'wedding feast') may refer to:

- "Vivaha Bhojanambu", a song from the 1957 Telugu film Mayabazar
- Vivaha Bhojanambu (1988 film), a 1988 Indian Telugu-language film
- Vivaha Bhojanambu (2021 film), a 2021 Indian Telugu-language film
- Vivaha Bhojanambu, a restaurant chain in Hyderabad owned by actor Sundeep Kishan
