= Ghattamaneni =

Ghattamaneni is a Telugu surname (variants include Gattamneni or Gattamaneni). Notable people with the surname include:

- Ghattamaneni Krishna is famous Telugu film actor and producer
- Ghattamaneni Mahesh Babu is famous Telugu film actor
- Ghattamaneni Manjula is an Indian film producer and actor
- Ghattamaneni Ramesh Babu is an Indian film producer and actor
- Ghattamaneni Venkat is an Indian entrepreneur and Technologist
