= Srinivasa Mangapuram (film) =

2026 Indian Telugu-language film

- Theatrical release poster
- Directed by: Ajay Bhupathi
- Written by: Ajay Bhupathi
- Produced by: P. Kiran
- Starring: Jaya Krishna Ghattamaneni; Rasha Thadani; Mohan Babu
- Cinematography: Jaya Krishna Gummadi
- Edited by: Madhav Kumar Gullapalli
- Music by: G. V. Prakash Kumar
- Production company: Chandamama Kathalu Pictures LLP
- Release date: 30 July 2026
- Country: India
- Language: Telugu

Srinivasa Mangapuram is a 2026 Indian Telugu-language romantic action film written and directed by Ajay Bhupathi. Produced by P. Kiran, the film marks the acting debuts of Jaya Krishna Ghattamaneni and Rasha Thadani in the lead roles, with Mohan Babu playing the main antagonist.

The film was theatrically released on 30 July 2026 to negative reviews and became a box-office bomb.

== Plot ==
=== Plot ===
Srinu (Jaya Krishna Ghattamaneni) arrives in Tirupati and stays with his friend Balu (Brahmaji). He soon meets Manga (Rasha Thadani), the daughter of powerful faction leader Peddi Reddy (Shaam), and falls in love with her. Manga initially rejects Srinu's advances and tells him that her marriage has already been arranged. Srinu nevertheless continues trying to win her over. Meanwhile, Varalakshmi (Vasuki Anand), a member of Manga's family with connections to Ballari, becomes suspicious of Srinu's identity and warns him to stay away from Manga.

As Srinu's relationship with Manga develops, people from Ballari begin searching for him. Following an attack on Srinu, his true identity is revealed: he is actually Vasu Babu, the grandson of powerful Ballari leader Venkatappaya Naidu (Mohan Babu). The story then shifts to the past, revealing that Vasu and Manga had already fallen in love before the events in Tirupati. Their relationship was opposed because of the rivalry between Venkatappaya Naidu and Peddi Reddy. Despite the opposition, Vasu and Manga secretly marry and decide to remain together.

The conflict between the two families eventually turns violent. During the confrontation, Manga is seriously injured and loses her memories of Vasu and their marriage. She is taken back to her family, while Vasu is left devastated. After realizing that Manga no longer remembers him, Vasu decides not to force her to accept their past relationship. Instead, he returns to her life under the name Srinu and attempts to make her fall in love with him again, without revealing that he is the man she had previously married.

The events shown at the beginning of the film therefore take on a different meaning. Manga believes Srinu is a new person in her life and continues to resist his love because she has no memory of their past. Vasu, however, remains patient and stays close to her. Meanwhile, Venkatappaya Naidu becomes involved after learning about Vasu's situation, while the continuing rivalry with Peddi Reddy creates further complications for the couple. Vasu ultimately chooses to win Manga's heart through their present relationship rather than relying on the memories she has lost.

Manga eventually realizes that she has genuinely fallen in love with Srinu despite not remembering their previous life together. She accepts his love, effectively choosing Vasu for a second time. The truth about their past and Vasu's identity becomes known, and the conflict between the families moves toward resolution. Vasu and Manga are finally reunited, overcoming the rivalry and circumstances that had separated them.

== Cast ==
- Jaya Krishna Ghattamaneni as Vasu Babu / Sreenu
- Rasha Thadani as Manga
- Mohan Babu as Venkatappaya Naidu
- Shaam as Peddi Reddy
- Naresh as Swatantra Babu
- Brahmaji as Balu
- Vadlamani Srinivas as Narayanappa
- Ajay
- Mahendran
- Vasuki Anand as Varalakshmi
- Giridhar as Venkatappayya Naidu's henchman

== Production ==
Production design for the film has been overseen by Sahi Suresh while the action sequences were choreographed by Real Sathish.

== Release ==
=== Theatrical ===
The film was theatrically released on 30 July 2026.

=== Home media ===
The post theatrical digital streaming rights were acquired by Amazon Prime Video.

== Reception ==
Suresh Kavirayani of The New Indian Express rated the film 2/5 and felt that the emotional depth that the story desperately needs is missing. He further stated, "the story has potential, weak writing and a formulaic screenplay dilute its impact". Sreeju Sudhakaran of Rediff.com gave a rating of 1.5 out of 5, called it a "formulaic storytelling" and felt Jaya Krishna Ghattamaneni's performance lacks consistency.
