= Jamadagni (film) =

1988 film by Bharathiraja

- Poster
- Directed by: Bharathiraja
- Written by: Bharathiraja
- Produced by: Chukkapalli Venubabu; G. Neelakanta Reddy
- Starring: Krishna; Radha; Kaikala Satyanarayana
- Cinematography: B. Kannan
- Music by: Ilayaraja
- Production company: Pavan Productions
- Release date: 16 July 1988
- Country: India
- Language: Telugu

Jamadagni is a 1988 Indian Telugu-language action film directed by Bharathiraja starring Krishna in the title role of a journalist who fights against a cunning politician and Radha. The film had musical score by Ilayaraja.

The film was a box office failure. It was dubbed in Tamil as Naarkaali Kanavugal, which never got released.

== Cast ==
- Krishna
- Radha
- Kaikala Satyanarayana
- Sumalatha
- Charu Hassan
- Gollapudi Maruti Rao
- Kakinada Shyamala
- Disco Shanti
- Tyagaraju

== Production ==
The film was produced by Neelakanta, who went on to direct films like Show and Missamma. He produced this film as he was a fan of films directed by Bharathiraja.

== Soundtrack ==
Ilayaraja scored and composed the film's soundtrack album.

S. No.	Title	Singer(s)
1.	Rakshasa Palana	Mano
2.	Rakshasa Palana	Chorus
3.	Kay Raja Kay	S. Janaki
4.	Lagi Jigi	S. Janaki, Ramesh
5.	Edi Swathi Jallu	Mano, Janaki
