= Preminchu =

2001 film by Boyina Subba Rao

- Directed by: Boyina Subba Rao
- Screenplay by: Satyanand
- Story by: Sriraj Ginne
- Produced by: D. Rama Naidu
- Starring: Laya; Sai Kiran; Roopa; Murali Mohan
- Cinematography: Hari Anumolu
- Music by: M. M. Srilekha
- Production company: Suresh Productions
- Release date: 11 April 2001
- Country: India
- Language: Telugu

Preminchu (transl. Fall in love) is a 2001 Indian Telugu-language drama film directed by Boyina Subba Rao and produced by D. Rama Naidu.The film stars Laya and Sai Kiran with newcomer Roopa, Murali Mohan, and Lakshmi in supporting roles. The plot follows Meena (Laya), a blind girl who is abandoned by her mother (Lakshmi) and grows up to be an independent woman.

The film was showcased among the Indian panorama section at the 2001 International Film Festival of India. The film won five Nandi Awards.

== Plot ==
Meena (Laya) is a college student, who was born blind. She is a confident, and independent young woman, who has learned to overcome the limitation her blindness presents. By learning to utilise her four other senses, Meena manages to live a relatively normal life. Through an accident she happens to make acquaintance with Suresh (Sai Kiran), and they both form a friendship. Suresh’s admiration for Meena grows, when he learns of her disability and how she has managed to over-come it.

Meanwhile, Suresh’s cousin Dolly (Roopa) has developed feelings for him, and her father (Kota) encourages her to marry Suresh, who’s considerably wealthy.

After Meena completes her studies, earning state wide the highest marks, she seeks to work as a lawyer. After being made aware of Meena’s friendship with Suresh and the love that is blooming from it, her father, Vasu (Murali Mohan), decides to marry her to Suresh. Upon visiting Suresh’s house to talk to him about the marriage, Vasu comes face to face with Kousalya (Lakshmi), his divorce wife, who is also Suresh’s aunt.

In a flash-back scene it is revealed that the reason for Vasu’s and Kousalya’s divorce was the blindness of their daughter Meena. While Vasu was ready to accept their daughter’s blindness and raise her, Kousalya wanted nothing to do with her, suggesting they giver her up to an orphanage. After their divorce, Vasu took Meena with him and raised her to the confident woman that she is now.

The remainder of the movie shows Meena’s struggle to take on her mother’s misgivings, in her endeavour to reunite her family.

== Cast ==
- Laya as Meena, confident blind girl
- Sai Kiran as Suresh, a rich man with kind heart
- Roopa as Dolly, Suresh's cousin
- Murali Mohan as Vasu, Meena's father
- Lakshmi as Kousalya, Meena's estranged mother
- Kota Srinivasa Rao as Dolly's father
- Rajitha
- Sri Lakshmi

== Production ==
The songs were picturised at Ooty and Amsterdam.

== Soundtrack ==
No.	Song	Singer(s)	Lyrics
1	"24 Carat Golden Babu"	S. P. Balasubrahmanyam, K. S. Chitra	Sirivennela Seetharama Sastry
2	"Hai Amma Hai Hai Amma"	S. P. Balasubrahmanyam, K. S. Chitra	Sirivennela Seetharama Sastry
3	"Kantene Amma Ani Ante Ela"	S. P. Balasubrahmanyam, K. S. Chitra	C. Narayana Reddy
4	"Maa Gundelalo Nindina Devatha"	S. P. Balasubrahmanyam, K. S. Chitra	Sirivennela Seetharama Sastry
5	"Swagatham Yuva Premikulaku Swagatham"	S. P. Balasubrahmanyam, K. S. Chitra	Sirivennela Seetharama Sastry
6	"Tolisari Ninu Choosi Preminchina"	S. P. Balasubrahmanyam, K. S. Chitra	Sirivennela Seetharama Sastry

== Reception ==
A critic from Sify wrote that "D.Ramanaidu should be appreciated for making an offbeat film Preminchu chronicling the progress of a blind girl who gains recognition against odds with determination. Undoubtedly upcoming actress Laaya essays the author-backed role splendidly without resorting to dramatics but director Subba Rao’s shoddy treatment in the second half particularly the sub-plot about her mother runs in total contrast to the progressive first half". Jeevi of Idlebrain.com rated the film 3 3/4 out of 5 and wrote that "Over all, this film is recommended for all the educated humane Telugu people who would like to get an insight into the world of blind". IndiaInfo wrote "Preminchu, is a great effort on part of the producer D.Rama Nadiu, who seems to be keen in making awrad winning movies. But then, this movie may not be as good as to fetch him any award but it is definitely a good movie. The movie would have been much more worth watching, if there were less sentimental and dramatic scenes. But all the same, it is worth a watch".

== Awards and honours ==
Year	Award	Award category	Winner	Ref.
2001	Nandi Awards	Best Feature Film - Gold	D. Rama Naidu	
2001	Nandi Awards	Best Actress	Laya	
2001	Nandi Awards	Best Supporting Actor	Murali Mohan	
2001	Nandi Awards	Best Lyricist	C. Narayana Reddy	
2001	Nandi Awards	Best Female Comedian	Sri Lakshmi	
