= Manasuku Nachindi =

2018 film directed by Manjula Ghattamaneni

- Film poster
- Directed by: Manjula Ghattamaneni
- Written by: Manjula Ghattamaneni
- Produced by: Sanjay Swaroop; P. Kiran
- Starring: Sundeep Kishan; Amyra Dastur; Tridha Choudhury; Adith Arun
- Narrated by: Mahesh Babu
- Cinematography: Ravi Yadav
- Music by: Radhan
- Production companies: Anandi Art Creations; Indira Productions
- Distributed by: Sri Venkateswara Films
- Release date: 16 February 2018
- Country: India
- Language: Telugu

Manasuku Nachindi (transl. The heart likes it) is a 2018 Indian Telugu-language romantic drama film directed by debutante Manjula Ghattamaneni. It is jointly produced by her husband Sanjay Swaroop and P. Kiran under his banner Anandi Art Creations. It features Sundeep Kishan, Amyra Dastur, Tridha Choudhury, and Adith Arun in the lead roles. The film's music was directed by Radhan. Dialogues in the film were written by Sai Madhav Burra. Released on 16 February 2018, the film failed to perform at the box office.

== Plot ==
Best friends Suraj and Nithya run away from their own wedding to find meaning in life. Despite falling for other people, there is an unspoken bond between them that they find hard to ignore.

== Cast ==
- Sundeep Kishan as Suraj
- Amyra Dastur as Nithya
- Tridha Choudhury as Nikki
- Adith Arun as Abhay
- Priyadarshi Pullikonda as Sarath
- Punarnavi Bhupalam as Lalli
- Jaanvi Swarup
- Abhay Bethiganti
- Mahesh Babu (voiceover)

== Soundtrack ==
The soundtrack of Manasuku Nachindi was composed by Radhan. Released through Aditya Music, all the songs were written by Ananta Sriram.

Manasuku Nachindi

Soundtrack album by Radhan
- Released: 2018
- Recorded: 2018
- Genre: Feature film soundtrack
- Length: 21:02
- Language: Telugu
- Label: Aditya Music
- Producer: Radhan

Radhan chronology
Arjun Reddy (2017)	Manasuku Nachindi (2018)	Husharu (2018)

Track	Song	Singer(s)	Duration
01	"Parichayamu leda"	Sameera Bharadwaj	03:04
02	"Rey Idi Nee Jaaga"	Yazin Nizar, Ramya NSK	03:50
03	"Ra Ra Ilara"	Haricharan	04:50
04	"Oh Pilla Nuv Pooladanda"	Naresh Iyer, Sameera Bharadwaj	03:40
05	"Chatu Matu Chupulanni"	Srinivas Raghunathan	02:10
06	"Gadichina Prathi Rojuni"	Shweta Mohan	03:28

== Release and reception ==
The film was initially scheduled to release on 26 January 2018 but was postponed to 16 February 2018.

Hemant Kumar of the Firstpost rated the film 2 out of 5. " the story of Manasuku Nachindhi does have some merit, but it just does not get the cinematic treatment it deserves", Kumar wrote. The Hindu's Srivathsan Nadadhur called the film "old wine in a new bottle." Nadadhur added that "Manasuku Nachindi tries to convey a lot, but all the cushioning that director Manjula does to cover up a stale story comes a cropper in a 150-minute preachy marathon."

Suhas Yellapantula writing for The Times of India rated the film two stars out of five and "Manjula Ghattamaneni makes the film with all the right intentions but falters in its execution." On performances, Yellapantula opined that "Amyra Dastur is the only bright spark in this film, who lights up the screen with a wonderful performance. Sundeep, like the audience, seems confused. Tridha looks good but is overall unconvincing, while Nasser is wasted in a poorly written role."
