= Bodduluri Rama Rao =

Indian politician

- Other names: Bodduluri
- Occupations: Former M.L.A, Film Producer
- Relatives: Gopichand Lagadapati (grandson); Ramakrishna Lagadapati (grandson)

Bodduluri Rama Rao is a former member of legislature of Andhra Pradesh and he is also a Telugu film producer.

== Early life ==
Bodduluri Ramarao belongs to the Ramireddipalle village in the Krishna district. He served as member of Andhra Pradesh Legislature for Jaggayyapet constituency during the period 1978. Bodduluri has a son, Venkateswararao Bodduluri, who is also an active politician in the Telugu Desam Party.

== Career ==
=== Politics ===
Bodduluri was elected for the sixth Andhra Pradesh Legislature constituted on 3 May 1978 from Jaggayyapet constituency and remained inactive for a few years. Later in January 2009 he filed nominations for MLC but withdrew after the strategy meeting conducted in district headquarters. Bodduluri is strong supporter of Telangana movement and also a strong supporter of the Jai Andhra Movement. Bodduluri has actively organized protests seeking separate Andhra in various parts of Andhra Pradesh.

=== Films ===
In 2007, he produced a film Mr. Medhavi under Life Style Art Pictures. The film was directed by G. Neelakanta Reddy and it features Raja Abel, Genelia D'Souza and Sonu Sood.

=== Other works ===
Bodduluri is the President of Andhra Pradesh temple union employees and have fought for the implementation of G.O 65(A) as per date 26 July 2010. He is also a member of Central Board of Film Certification of Andhra Pradesh.
