= Kavya's Diary =

- Movie poster
- Directed by: V. K. Prakash
- Written by: Indira Productions Creative Unit
- Dialogues by: Vakkantham Vamsi
- Produced by: Manjula Ghattamaneni; Sanjay Swaroop
- Starring: Manjula Ghattamaneni; Charmy Kaur; Indrajith
- Cinematography: Shamdat Sainudeen
- Music by: Manu Ramesan
- Production company: Indira Productions
- Release date: 5 June 2009
- Language: Telugu

Kavya's Diary is a 2009 Indian Telugu film directed by V.K.Prakash and starring Manjula Ghattamaneni, Charmy Kaur, and Indrajith. The film was made with a small budget of Rs. 4 Crores. The movie is heavily inspired by the 1992 Hollywood thriller The Hand That Rocks the Cradle.

== Plot ==
Raj (Indrajeet) and Pooja (Manjula Swaroop) are a married couple who move into a new house with their children. Desperate for a nanny to take care of their children, they hire Kavya who is unemployed, after she saves Pooja's life. Kavya grows close to the family and they come to consider her part of the family. However, as the movie progresses, it is revealed that Kavya was the wife of Kiran; a gynecologist who committed suicide after Pooja accused him of sexually assaulting her. Other patients supported this claim and he eventually committed suicide. In an attempt to save him, Kavya accidentally miscarries. She eventually tries to destroy the family and kill Pooja to get revenge for her loss. Kavya dies by drowning when she was about to kill Pooja.The movie is a remake of the English movie, 'The Hand that Rocks the Cradle'.

== Cast ==
- Manjula Ghattamaneni as Pooja
- Charmy Kaur as Kavya
- Indrajith as Raj
- Shashank as Abhi
- Satyam Rajesh as Athi D
- Dr. Bharath Reddy as Kiran, Kavya's husband
- Leena Sidhu

== Soundtrack ==
Kavya's Diary

Soundtrack album by Manu Ramesan
- Released: 2009
- Recorded: 2009
- Genre: Feature film soundtrack
- Length: 20:29
- Label: Aditya Music
- Producer: Manu Ramesan

Manu Ramesan chronology
Pidichirukku (2008)	Kavya's Diary (2009)	Gulumal: The Escape (2009)

Music was composed by Manu Ramesan and released by Aditya Music.

Track-List
No.	Title	Lyrics	Singer(s)	Length
1.	"Enno Enno"	Ananta Sriram	Geetha Madhuri, Pranavi	3:07
2.	"Hayire Hayire"	Ananta Sriram	Hemachandra	4:45
3.	"Thelusuko"	Ananta Sriram	Karthik, Rita	4:08
4.	"O Pranama"	Ananta Sriram	M. M. Srilekha, Pardha Saradhi	4:28
5.	"Po Velli Po"	Ramajogayya Sastry	Tippu	4:01
Total length:				20:29
