= Prasanna Kumar =

Indian cinematographer (born 1987)

Prasanna S. Kumar
- Born: Prasanna S. Kumar; 12 March 1987 (age 39)
- Occupation: Cinematographer
- Years active: 2016-present

Prasanna S. Kumar is an Indian cinematographer who works predominantly in Tamil language films and television.

== Career ==
His cousin is director Sasi and he graduated from a college of arts. During the early stages of his career, he was associated with cinematographer P. G. Muthiah in Poo. After a couple of years working with him, he then moved on to work with R. Rathnavelu in David (2013), Haridas (2013), and 1: Nenokkadine (2014). He also associated with Ravi K Chandran and worked under G. N. R. Kumaravelan. He made his debut with Pichaikkaran, which was directed by Sasi.

== Filmography ==
- All films are in Tamil, unless otherwise noted.

Year	Title	Language	Note
2016	Pichaikkaran	Tamil	
2017	Ivan Thanthiran	Tamil	
2018	Uru	Tamil	
2019	Boomerang	Tamil	
2019	Sivappu Manjal Pachai	Tamil	
2020	Seeru	Tamil	
2023	Kasethan Kadavulada	Tamil	
2023	Criminal	Tamil	
2023	Nooru kodi Vaanavil	Tamil	Yet to release
2024	Kuruvikaaran	Tamil	Yet to release
2025	Madraskaaran	Tamil	
2026	Vadam	Tamil	
2026	Made in Korea	Tamil	

== TV series ==
Year	Title	Platform	Language	Notes
2020	Kannamoochi	Zee5	Tamil	
2022	Fingertip (season 2)	Zee5	Tamil	
2023	Newsense	Aha	Telugu	
2024	Bahishkarana	Zee5	Telugu	
2024	Chutney Sambar	Disney+Hotstar	Tamil	
