= Naani =

- Film poster
- Directed by: S. J. Suryah
- Written by: S. J. Suryah; Sobhan (Dialogues)
- Produced by: Manjula Ghattamaneni Lawrence Ram (Assistant Director)
- Starring: Mahesh Babu; Ameesha Patel; Devayani
- Cinematography: K. V. Guhan
- Edited by: A. Sreekar Prasad
- Music by: A. R. Rahman
- Production company: Indira Productions
- Release date: 14 May 2004
- Running time: 120 minutes
- Country: India
- Language: Telugu
- Budget: est.₹12 crore

Naani is a 2004 Indian Telugu-language science fiction romantic comedy film directed by S. J. Suryah and starring Mahesh Babu in a dual role as father and son, alongside Ameesha Patel and Devayani. The film is a bilingual, simultaneously shot in Tamil as New with a slightly different cast and features music composed by A. R. Rahman. Made on a budget of ₹12 crore, the film released on 14 May 2004. It was a box office failure.It was an unofficial remake of American Film Big (1988).

== Plot ==
Naani is a mischievous eight-year-old boy who is always troubling his mother. His mother scolds him for his behaviour, such as when he eats toothpaste or wets his bed. Naani falls down on the road one day, and a young woman helps him. Naani's elder brother plans to watch a movie with his friends in the absence of their parents, and Naani demands to join him, which his brother does not allow. Angered, Naani cuts off the power, which creates a short circuit at home. Naani's mother scolds him and shouts at her husband for not stopping with one child. This hurts Naani, and he runs away from home to jump into a river. But he is stopped by an old man who takes Naani to his place. The old man introduces himself as a scientist who has his own laboratory. He insists that Naani help him in his research. Naani agrees, and the scientist uses his research to transform him into a young adult man. Naani starts to live as a young man physically, but remains a child mentally. He stays away from his family. The only person other than the scientist who knows the truth is his childhood friend. Naani meets a girl (Priya) at a park who helped him once when he fell down. Naani helps remove dust from her eyes, smiles at her, and leaves. The girl is attracted to him and looks for him.

Naani goes for a job interview at a toy manufacturing company. The owner who interviews him demands that he think like a child to understand children's tastes. Naani gets the job easily. The company falls into the hands of the owner's daughter, who turns out to be Priya. Priya is happy to see Naani in her company. Their friendship makes Raj (another employee) jealous. Naani overcomes Raj's idea for a new type of bed for kids and introduces his own idea. Naani meets his brother as an anonymous man and hears that their mother is depressed over Naani's disappearance. Naani meets his mother, who had fallen ill. Naani asks the scientist to change him back. The scientist complies, and Naani reconciles with his mother. That night, he changes back into the young man, shocking the scientist.

Naani lives as an eight-year-old boy during the day and as a twenty-eight-year-old man (Vijay aka Vichu) at night. Priya expresses her love, but Vichu tells her to love a man suitable for her age. The scientist tells Vichu to accept Priya. Priya asks him to accompany her to a matinee. Young boy Naani cannot appear. He sees Priya angrily waiting for Vichu at the theatre while going home with his mother. Naani's mother befriends Priya, and Priya comes to like Naani. Priya gets angry at Vichu's absence. She finally decides to marry Vichu. Raj kidnaps him on the wedding day, but then Vichu becomes Naani. The kidnappers release him. Naani becomes Vichu and marries Priya that evening. Vichu knows nothing about marital life.

Naani somehow manages his mother by disappearing at night. Priya needs a child, so she intentionally shows her skin to Vichu, who responds, and they have sex. Priya becomes pregnant. Vichu once meets his mother and understands the difficulties of pregnancy for a woman. Naani's child friend demands to play with him, but Naani's schedule is too complicated. Naani slaps his friend to make him angry and reveals the truth to Priya. Priya is shocked to hear that she is bearing the child of a child.

Priya argues with Vichu for marrying her and making her pregnant, but Vichu blames her arrogance for involving him. Naani turns into Vichu in front of her, shocking Priya. Vichu reveals that he loves her. Priya now goes into labour, and Vichu takes her to the hospital. On the way, Vichu is stopped by Raj's men seeking revenge. Vichu overcomes them. Everybody learns the truth about Naani and Priya as she gives birth to their son.

Twenty years pass. Naani reaches twenty-eight. He lives with Priya as her husband. He goes inside his room as Naani and comes out as a forty-eight-year-old Vichu, Jai's father of a twenty-year-old son.

== Cast ==
- Mahesh Babu in a dual role as
  - Naani (Vijay Kumar a.k.a. Vijju)
    - Master Parth Dave as Naani (child)
  - Jai, Naani's son (cameo appearance)
- Ameesha Patel as Priya
- Devayani as Indira Devi
- Aishwarya as Priya's friend
- Nassar as Sekhar, Priya's father
- Raghuvaran as Scientist (Science)
- Brahmanandam as Satyam
- Ali as Simham
- Ravi Babu as Raj, Satyam's son
- Sanjay Swaroop as Naani's father
- Sunil as Vijay Kumar / X
- Kota Srinivasa Rao as Doctor
- Sudhakar as income tax officer
- Dharmavarapu Subramanyam as police officer
- Junior Relangi as a police officer
- Master Ashok Galla as Naani's friend
- Galla Jayadev in a special appearance
- Ramya Krishna in a special appearance in "Markandeya" (deleted from theatrical cut)
- Anjala Zaveri in a special appearance
- Kiran Rathod in a special appearance
- S. J. Surya as Math Professor (cameo appearance)

== Production ==
After the success of Kushi (2000) and its Telugu version Kushi (2001), Suryah began pre-production work on a third story titled New (2004). During the process, he felt that making the story into a bilingual film with a Telugu version would help the film's finances and that Mahesh Babu was a perfect fit for the main role. Hence, production began for the Telugu version, Naani, as well. A few scenes and song picturizations were modified from the Tamil version. The song "If You Wanna," in Tamil, is a female solo choreographed solely on Simran, while it was recorded as a duet "Naaku Nuvvu" in Telugu, featuring both Mahesh and Ameesha. The track involving Kiran Rathod was not present in the Telugu version; instead, the song "Markandeya"/"Kumbakonam" was picturized on Mahesh Babu and Ramya Krishna as a simple duet. The scene involving Shakeela was exclusively shot for the Telugu version, and not present in Tamil. The strong adult theme in the Tamil version was toned down to suit Mahesh Babu's image, hence the Telugu version received a "U" certificate, while the Tamil received an "A" along with additional censor cuts, controversies, and fights.

== Soundtrack ==
Naani

Soundtrack album by A. R. Rahman
- Released: 3 April 2004
- Recorded: Panchathan Record Inn
- Genre: Feature Film Soundtrack
- Producer: A. R. Rahman

A. R. Rahman chronology
New (2004)	Naani (2004)	Aayutha Ezhuthu (2004)

Track listing
No.	Title	Lyrics	Singer(s)	Length
1.	"Naani Vayase"	Veturi Sundararama Murthy, Blaaze (English lyrics)	Karthik, Vijay Prakash, Blaaze, Sunitha Sarathy, Tanvi Shah	4:33
2.	"Chakkera"	Sirivennela Seetharama Sastry	S.P. Balasubrahmanyam, Sujatha Mohan	5:53
3.	"Naaku Nuvvu"	Sirivennela Seetharama Sastry, Blaaze (English lyrics)	Hariharan, Gopika Poornima, Anupama, Aparna	4:11
4.	"Pedave Palikina"	Chandrabose	Unnikrishnan, Sadhana Sargam	4:24
5.	"Vasta Nee Venuka"	Sirivennela Seetharama Sastry	Hariharan, Harini	5:34
6.	"Markandeya"	Veturi Sundararama Murthy	Shankar Mahadevan, Nithyasree Mahadevan	6:12
7.	"Spiderman"	Sirivennela Seetharama Sastry	Kunal Ganjawala, Gopika Poornima	5:59
Total length:				36:56

== Reception ==
Jeevi of Idlebrain.com rated the film two out of five, writing, "the movie suffers from artificialness and [a] bad script." A critic from Sify wrote that "The film has far too many double entendres and crude gags" and added that "One wonders if the film is from the sane S.J.Suryah who made a wholesome entertainer like Kushi". A critic from IANS rated the film two-and-a-half out of five and wrote that "It is interesting fare for viewers who crave for different movies. Unfortunately, the Telugu audience has rarely patronised films with non-heroes or anti-heroes". The Tamil version performed well, while the Telugu version was not as strong commercially.

== See also ==
- 13 Going on 30 (2004)
