= Nandanavanam 120km =

- Theatrical release poster
- Directed by: Neelakanta
- Written by: Neelakanta
- Produced by: Neelakanta
- Starring: Ajay Varma; Manasa; Kota Srinivasa Rao
- Narrated by: T. Karunasree
- Cinematography: P. G. Vinda
- Edited by: V. Nagi Reddy
- Music by: Vijay Kurakula
- Production company: BLue Sky Films
- Release date: 30 June 2006 (India)
- Country: India
- Language: Telugu

Nandhavanam 120 km is a 2006 Indian Telugu language thriller film written directed and produced by Neelakanta and stars newcomers Ajay Varma and Manasa alongside Kota Srinivasa Rao. The film was released on 30 June 2006.

== Plot ==
Amar (Ajay Varma) is a thief who makes a deal with Banerjee (Kota Srinivasa Rao) to scam the owners of the Nandanavanam estate for whom Banerjee works as an auditor. Benerjee promises a ransom of 1 lakh rupees for Amar to act as Sandeep, a lookalike of Amar. Benerjee convinces Amar that Sandeep has been kidnapped and will not return until their work at the estate is done. Amar who acts as Sandeep joins Sandeep's family and convinces everyone. One night when left alone in the estate, Amar realises that he is being trapped by Benarjee. He tries to convince Sandeep's family that he's a fake but in vain because of Benerjee's cautiousness. In the midst of saving Sandeep and his family, Amar realises that he actually is Sandeep who left his estate as a child, adopted by a Christian man who names him Amar. Benerjee is actually a psychiatrist who gives treatment to him and makes Amar remember his past.

== Cast ==
- Ajay Varma as Amar D. Fredericks / Sandeep (dual role)
- Manasa as Divya
- Naresh as Giri
- Kota Srinivasa Rao as Banerjee
- Talluri Rameshwari as Rajeswari (Sandeep's mother)
- Prabhu as Amar's adoptive father
- Giridhar as Vasu
- Surekha Vani as Suneetha (Sandeep's sister)
- Gautam Raju as Mallu

== Production ==
G. Neelakanta Reddy decided his script and story needed "fresh Faces" and so chose to use relative newcomers for this latest project. He also decided that, despite the use of "catchy tunes" in his 2003 film Missamma, with his being a "believer in the dominance of script over everything", this project would be a film without dependence on songs. Due to her wish to perform in a Telugu film, Mumbai actress Talluri Rameshwari had begged Neelakanta for a role in this project.

== Reception ==
Cinegoers.com gave 3.5 out of 5 stating "Not a masterpiece, but truly a good and fearless attempt."
