= Toss (2007 film) =

2007 film by Priyadarshini Ram

- DVD cover
- Directed by: Priyadarshini Ram
- Written by: Priyadarshini Ram; Sampath Nandi (dialogue)
- Produced by: K. K. Radha Mohan; Dev Amar
- Starring: Upendra; Raja; Kamna Jethmalani; Priyamani
- Cinematography: T. Surendra Reddy
- Edited by: Anil Kumar Bonthu
- Music by: Mani Sharma
- Release date: 14 July 2007
- Country: India
- Language: Telugu

Toss is a 2007 Indian Telugu-language action film written and directed by Priyadarshini Ram. The film stars Upendra, Raja, Kamna Jethmalani, and Priyamani in prominent roles. The film was released on 14 July 2007 to negative reviews. This is the first film in India to be shot with the Thompson Viper Filmstream Camera by cinematographer T. Surendra Reddy.

== Plot ==
Parasuram (Raja) is a self-employed youth with a difference. He does justice to the wrongdoers by charging SET (Self Employment Tax). Neelakanta (Upendra) is an anti-social element who is very fond of his blind sister Naina (Priyamani). They share a dark past. Nayak (Suman), the local police chief, appoints Parasuram as undercover cop to recover ₹ 10 crore stolen by Neelakanta. Parasuram gets hold of Naina and makes her fall in love with him. The rest of the story is about the conflict between Parasuram and Neelakanta.

== Cast ==
- Upendra as Neelakanta
- Raja as Parasuram
- Priyamani as Naina
- Ali
- Kamna Jethmalani as Nisha
- Suman as Naik
- Vinod Kumar as Sivaji Rao
- Krishna Bhagavaan as Varanda Babu
- Supreeth
- Ramya
- Sudha
- Abhinayashree
- Raghunatha Reddy as Agastya
- Jeeva
- Venu Madhav

== Soundtrack ==
No.	Title	Singer(s)	Length
1.	"O Madhu Vandana"	Shreya Ghoshal
2.	"Prema Prema"	Rahul, Rita
3.	"Yeh Babuji"	Naveen, Rita
4.	"Toss Toss"	Ranjith, Naveen
5.	"Em Chilako"	Ravi Verma, Vijayalakshmi

== Reception ==
A critic from Idlebrain.com wrote that "We expect a sensible and meaningful film when an adman directs a film, but what we get from Toss is exactly opposite". A critic from Full Hyderabad wrote that "You will do yourself a favor by skipping this one just about anything else will entertain you better". A critic from Sify wrote that "Toss projects Upendra, Kannada cinema?s superstar as a terrific mass hero in the main lead. Priyadharsini Ram (of Manodu fame) who takes credit for story, screenplay, editing and direction has depended more on the packaging rather than on the content".
