= Gopichand Lagadapati =

Indian actor and film director (born 1981)

- Occupations: Actor, director, producer, screenwriter
- Website: www.gopichandlagadapati.com

Gopichand Lagadapati is an Indian actor, writer, director and producer. He made his acting debut in the Telugu film Anand directed by Sekhar Kammula, and debuted as a producer on the film Mr. Medhavi.

== Early life ==
Lagadapati was born in India. His father, Sangaiah Lagadapati, is a Telugu professor. Lagadapati did his graduation in Hotel Management from a college affiliated with Osmania University, Hyderabad. His maternal grandfather Bodduluri Rama Rao is a former Member of the Andhra Pradesh Legislature from Jaggayyapet constituency.

== Career ==
Lagadapati's first film as a lead actor is Rendella Tharuvatha, which received mixed responses and was a commercial failure at the box office. He next appeared in an Indian English film, On the Other Side which was released in US. The film was released with the name Indian Beauty in Telugu.

In 2007, Lagadapati worked on Mr. Medhavi as an executive producer in 2008. The film was critically acclaimed but remained a commercial failure at the box office.

== Filmography ==
=== Films ===
Year	Title	Role	Notes
2004	Anand	Ram	
2005	Rendella Tharuvatha	Vamsi	
2006	Indian Beauty	Vishal	
2008	Mr. Medhavi	—N/a	Executive producer
2014	Bhopal: A Prayer for Rain	Steward	Also assistant director
2022	Virgin Story		Also lyricist and creative producer

=== Television ===
Year	Title	Role	Notes
2001	Priya Nestam	Gopi	Also assistant director
2004	City Beats	—N/a	Writer and director
2008	Blessing in Disguise	Rock	Also writer and assistant director
