= Rendella Tharuvatha =

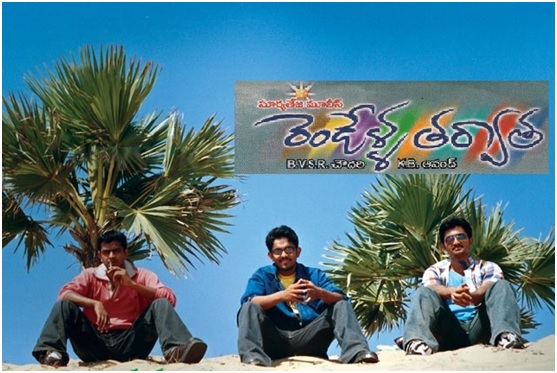
- Directed by: K. B. Anand
- Written by: K. B. Anand
- Produced by: BVSR. Chowdary
- Starring: Sreeram Gokul; Dhanush K. P.; Gopichand Lagadapati
- Cinematography: Ramana Salva
- Edited by: Mohana Ramarao
- Music by: Seshu Kumar P.
- Production company: Surya Teja Films
- Distributed by: Mayuri Film Distributors
- Release date: 25 July 2005
- Running time: 130 minutes
- Country: India
- Language: Telugu

Rendella Tharuvatha (English : After Two Years) is a 2005 Indian Telugu-language thriller film directed by K. B. Anand. The film stars Sreeram Gokul, Danish K. P. and Gopichand Lagadapati in the lead roles along with Sreeji.

== Plot ==
Rendella Tharuvatha is the story of three young men who follow their hearts. They always believe in the ideology that life could be adventurous in creating new paths rather than walking in the good old beaten path. These three choose the creative field as it could fill their creative thirst. In certain situation, they meet Malathi. Malathi falls in love with Kittu in the process. Looking at the creative dimension in these three guys, she introduces them to Gandam, who runs creative agency. Gandam is quite ebullient person and likes the creative approach in these three boys. Gandam already gathered many rivalries in the market because of the tough competition he gives to others. With these three guys joining the company it becomes highly impossible for others to sustain in the market. With company's rapid growth and success they all decide to party in an abandoned place far from city. All of them get fully drunk and slowly move into a nearby cemetery. Vamshi who is also a photographer plans a prank to fool Gandam. They all go into sleep only to find that Gandam is missing. The practical joke played by three guys misfires and they become the prime suspects behind the Gandam's missing case. How these three guys prove their innocence makes the rest of the story.

== Cast ==
- Sreeram Gokul as Kittu
- Danush K. P. as Madhu
- Gopichand Lagadapati as Vamsi
- Sreeji as Malathi
- Sarath Babu as Gandam
- Melkote as Panchabhootam
- Baby Yasasvi

== Soundtrack ==
Rendella Tharuvata

Soundtrack album by Seshu Kumar P.
- Released: 12 June 2005
- Recorded: 2005
- Genre: Feature film soundtrack
- Length: 21:06
- Language: Telugu
- Label: Padmini Music

The music was composed by Seshu Kumar.

No.	Title	Singer(s)	Length
1.	"Rendella Tharuvata"	Valisha Babji	1:26
2.	"Chinni Chinni"	Malavika, Valisha Babji	4:31
3.	"Emcet...Edcet"	Linus	4:59
4.	"Holi"	Gayatri, Mythili, Valisha Babji	4:46
5.	"Rendella Tharuvatha"	Valisha Babji	1:26
6.	"Enta Enta Dhooram"	Nishma, Suresh Krishna	5:18
Total length:			21:06

== Critical reception ==
The film received mostly negative reviews from the critics.

Telugucinema.com wrote, "KB.Anand seems to have inspired by Aitey's success and started a film in that manner but his futile effort to weave a kidnap drama out of nothing is tiresome and illogical".

Idlebrain.com wrote, "First half of the film is OK. Second half of the film is boring. The climax of the film is very badly handled".

Aslesha of Cinegoer wrote, "Director Anand displays good taking skills but fails in giving an interesting narrative line".

== Box office ==
Rendella Tharuvatha, released on 29 July 2005, proved to be a box office disaster in its first week. The film failed to recover its budget.
