= Newsense =

2023 Indian TV series

- Promotional release poster
- Genre: Political drama
- Created by: Sri Prawin Kumar
- Written by: Priyadarshini Ram
- Directed by: Sri Prawin Kumar
- Starring: Navdeep; Bindu Madhavi
- Music by: Suresh Bobblli
- Country of origin: India
- Original language: Telugu
- No. of seasons: 1
- No. of episodes: 6

Production
- Executive producers: Nikhil Reddy Challapalli; Vineet Sai Kota; Sasikiran Narayana
- Producers: Raviteja Dhamaka; T.G. Vishwa Prasad
- Cinematography: Anantnag Kavuri; Vedaraman; Prasanna Kumar
- Editor: Srinu Bainaboina

Original release
- Network: aha
- Release: 12 May 2023

Newsense is a 2023 Indian Telugu-language political drama television series directed by Sri Prawin Kumar, written by Priyadarshini Ram, and starring Navdeep and Bindu Madhavi. The series was released on 12 May 2023 on aha with critics praising the series' intent but criticising its ending.

== Cast ==
- Navdeep as Shiva
- Bindu Madhavi as Neela
- Ramesh Konambhotla
- Manoj Muthyam as Surendra
- Mahima Srinivas
- Shelly Nabu Kumar
- Nanda Gopal as Edwin
- Ramesh Konambhotla
- Charan Kurugonda
- Purna Chandra
- Gnaneshwar Devanapalli
- Katta Anthony
- Kumari
- Chinna Kondayya
- Nalla Sreedhar Reddy as Politician

== Episodes ==
No.	Title	Directed by	Written by	Original release date
1	"Fourth Estate"	Sri Prawin Kumar	Priyadarshini Ram	12 May 2023
2	"White Estate"	Sri Prawin Kumar	Priyadarshini Ram	12 May 2023
3	"Coverage"	Sri Prawin Kumar	Priyadarshini Ram	12 May 2023
4	"Limelight"	Sri Prawin Kumar	Priyadarshini Ram	12 May 2023
5	"The Glare"	Sri Prawin Kumar	Priyadarshini Ram	12 May 2023
6	"Watch Dog"	Sri Prawin Kumar	Priyadarshini Ram	12 May 2023

== Reception ==
A critic from Cinema Express rated the series 3.5/5 stars and wrote, "Newsense, an OTT endeavour, is a refreshing departure on multiple levels. There are no preachy, moralising positions ever taken in the series, but its takeaways and clapbacks, on who is wrong and who is wronged, are crystal clear". Sangeetha Devi Dundoo of The Hindu wrote, "Not all of the drama is riveting. But with the premise and its multitude of characters established, there’s enough scope to weave a more intriguing web of media, police and politics in the next season". A critic from The Times of India rated the series 3/5 stars and wrote, "Newsense, with its nuanced performances, intriguing story and decent production values, makes for a good watch". A critic from Telangana Today wrote, "Newsense is so good at its story and below par in its storytelling. The series can be a one-time watch but not so worth waiting for season 2". A critic from Times Now wrote, "In a nutshell, if we kept aside all the flaws and a 'dialogue' by a cop at the end, the show highlights those issues, which existed back in the 90s and 2000 and even exist today".
