= Raju Gadu =

- Theatrical release poster
- Directed by: Sanjana Reddy
- Screenplay by: Sanjana Reddy
- Story by: Habib Faisal; Maruthi
- Produced by: Sunkara Ramabrahmam
- Starring: Raj Tarun; Amyra Dastur; Rajendra Prasad
- Cinematography: B. Rajasekar
- Edited by: M. R. Varma
- Music by: Gopi Sundar
- Production company: AK Entertainments Pvt Ltd
- Release date: 1 June 2018
- Running time: 130 mins
- Country: India
- Language: Telugu

Raju Gadu is a 2018 Indian Telugu-language comedy film directed by Sanjana Reddy and produced by AK Entertainments. The film stars Raj Tarun, Amyra Dastur, and Rajendra Prasad with music composed by Gopi Sundar. The film was released on 1 June 2018. Sajid Nadiadwala is developing the Hindi remake named Pilfer Singh with Reddy as director and Kartik Aaryan and Amyra Dastur as leads.

== Plot ==
Raju is a kleptomaniac, i.e., he impulsively steals, which his father Narayana discovers in childhood. He takes him to Dr. Saima, who has pledged to cure it by inventing a new medicine, but in vain. Due to the disorder, Raju fails to have a girlfriend. However, his quest ends with the beautiful Tanvi, who covers his problem with various funny reasons. Narayana proceeds with the bridal connections when Tanvi's parents stipulate for her grandfather Suryanarayana's approval, and they all walk on.

Meanwhile, Suryanarayana is top-tier in the village, hates thieves, and punishes them by chopping off their hands. Frightened by it, Raju forges Narayana as a victim of kleptomania. Parallelly, a terrorist gang is in Raju's hunt since he left Raju their bomb, which was to explode for a contract of 100 crores. Upon more, Anji, Suryanarayana's past servant who has been ostracized for stealing temple jewelry, returns after 25 years as a tycoon to seek vengeance. Thus, he ruses & re-conducts theft and incriminates Suryanarayana.

Whereat, Raju takes the blame to shield his honor by admitting his infirmity when he faces the music and receives Tanvi's loathing. Eventually, Anji shakes hands with the terrorists and provides the bomb in Raju's towel. Hereupon, Raju captures the heels, unveiling Anji to be a miscreant, when he steals the triggering device from the terrorists, which activates, and the gang blasts out. At last, Tanvi & her family realize Raju's virtue and pleads pardon. Finally, the movie ends happily with the post-credits; Raju again steals the wedding chain at the time of his marriage.

== Cast ==
- Raj Tarun as Raju
- Amyra Dastur as Tanvi
- Pujita Ponnada as Vennela
- Rajendra Prasad as Narayana, Raju's father
- Sithara as Seeta, Raju's mother
- Shiju as Tanvi's father
- Pramodini Pammi as Tanvi's mother
- Nagineedu as Suryanarayana, Tanvi's grandfather
- Rao Ramesh as Anji
- Subbaraju as Gopi
- Prudhvi Raj as Dr. Saima
- Raja Ravindra as Lingaraju
- Praveen as Raju's friend
- Krishna Bhagavan as Gopi's assistant
- Raghu Karumanchi
- Khayyum
- Fish Venkat
- Shakalaka Shankar

== Soundtrack ==
Raju Gadu

Film score by Gopi Sundar
- Released: 2017
- Genre: Soundtrack
- Length: 16:53
- Label: Aditya Music
- Producer: Gopi Sundar

Music composed by Gopi Sundar. Music released on ADITYA Music Company.

| No. | Title | Lyrics | Singer(s) | Length |
|---|---|---|---|---|
| 1. | "Rabbaru Buggala Ramachilaka" | Ramajogayya Sastry | Hemachandra | 4:19 |
| 2. | "Arere Arere" | Ramajogayya Sastry | Sai Charan | 4:34 |
| 3. | "Rendu Kalla Ninda" | Bhaskarabhatla | Sri Krishna, Ramya Behara | 4:03 |
| 4. | "Devatalara Devatalara" | Ramajogayya Sastry | Sai Charan, Harini Ivaturi | 3:57 |
| 5. | "Sarasaku Ra" | Ramajogayya Sastry | Mohana Bhogaraju, Saketh Komanduri, Arjun Chandy | 5:03 |
| Total length: | | | | 16:53 |

== Reception ==
Srivathsan Nandadur of The Hindu wrote: "Sanjana Reddy’s directorial debut Rajugadu comes with a ‘been there done that’ trope of milking a protagonist's condition to go on a comic spree. " Nandadur felt that the story lacked a major conflict point. A reviewer from Sify stated that the film failed miserably and added, "It is sad to see even young female directors are treading the path of formulaic stories and screenplays that was paved by outdated male film makers."

Vyas in his review for The Hans India rated the film 2.5 of 5 and wrote: "The film lacks strong scenes and excellent characterizations. The climax is a disappointment too. Though the intention of the film is good, it was not translated well." The Times of India critic Neeshita Nyayapati rated the film 1/5 and called it "stiled and boring."
