= Sriraj Ginne =

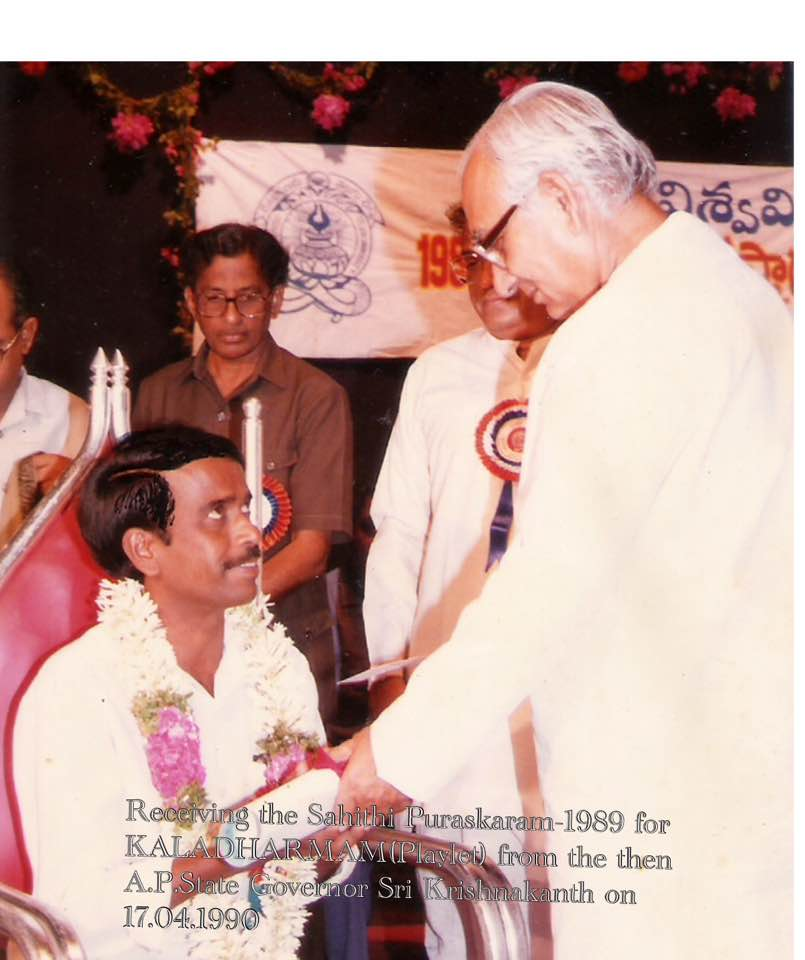
- Sriraj receiving Sahithi Puraskaram 1989
- Born: Ginne; 22 November 1946; Visakhapatnam, Andhra Pradesh, India.
- Occupation: Writer
- Spouse: Ginne Parvathi Devi
- Parent(s): Rajalingam & Seshamma

Sriraj Ginne is a progressive story writer, play-wright and film script writer in Telugu. His stories have been translated into various Indian languages. Sriraj has given expression to various aspects of the realities of middle-class life in his stories. Through his impressive stories, he portrayed the genesis of anomalies of the converted society. The positive consciousness of living is easily visible in his work.

In these stories, Sriraj unfolds his time and many layers of society to the readers. His themes include complexity of life, stress, frustration, and rapid change. Writing from a middle-class perspective, Sriraj wrote on how shifting societal dynamics impact individual and collective mindsets in this demographic. His storytelling features intentional artistic disorder. His storytelling reflects his ideological vision and sympathies, establishing his position in contemporary Telugu literature.

== Background ==
Sriraj the writer, who likes the style of the authors Ravi Sastri and Robert Browning, was born on 22 November, in Visakhapatnam (Malkapuram, Andhra Pradesh, India). Mrs. Seshamma and Sri Rajalingam are the parents of the writer. Wife Mrs. Satya Parvathi Devi is a home maker while three children (one boy and two girls) have settled in America. He studied B.Sc., in A.V.N. College, Diploma in Theater Arts (Play Direction) in Andhra University, Visakhapatnam. He currently resides in Visakhapatnam as a retired employee of BSNL (Central Government).

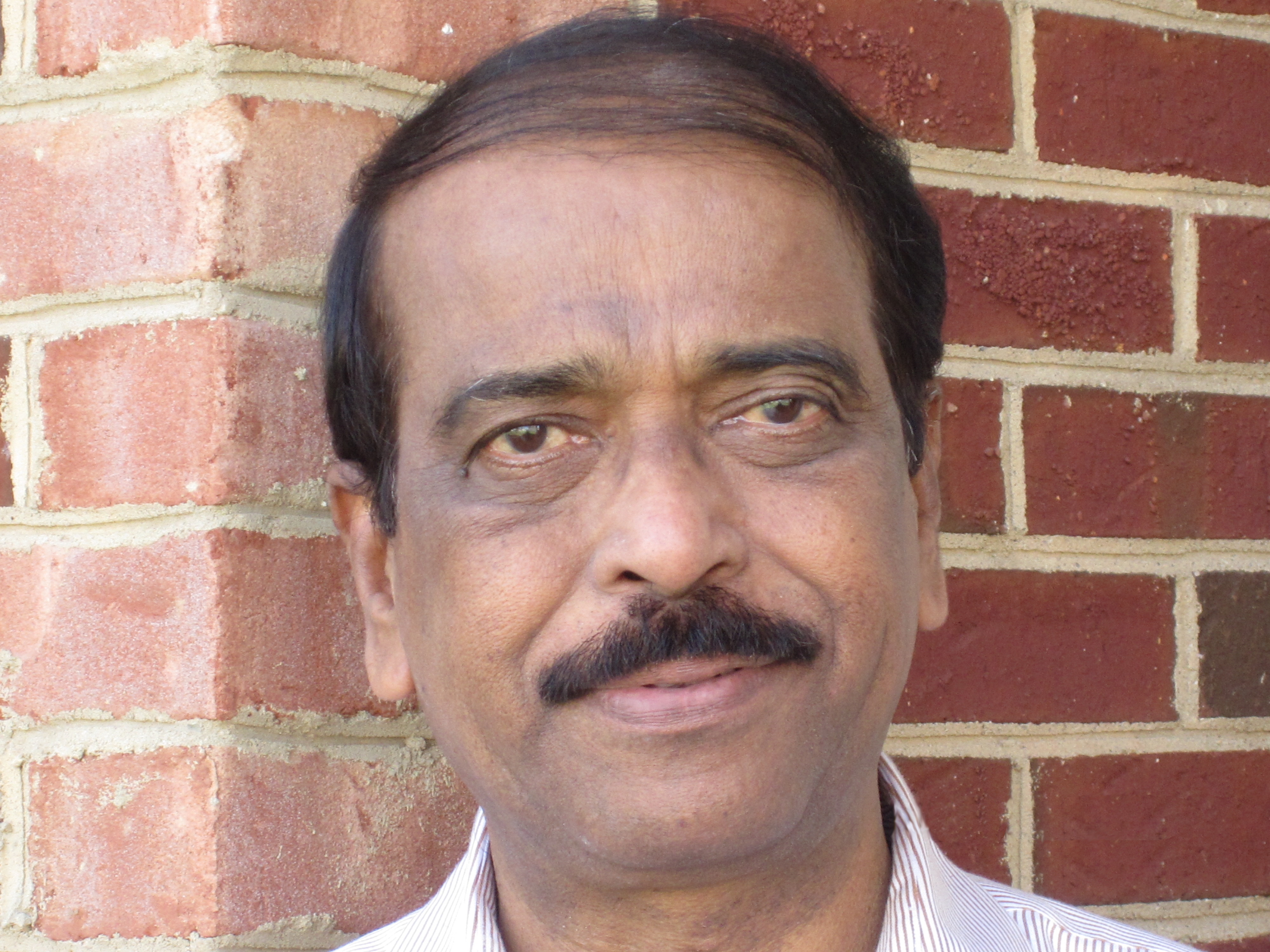
Sriraj photo taken on 14 April 2011

He has written the first story for the magazine in the days of high school. About sixty short stories and some poems have been published in leading weekly and monthly magazines and special editions. Some of these stories have been translated into Hindi, Kannada, Oriya, and English. Story collections have emerged: Okka kshanam (1983), Chukkala Seema (1985), Velugu Vaakitloki (2003), Ujala Ki Orr (Hindi Translation 2018), The Lost Case (Short Story).

For theatrical performance and All India Radio, he has written about 40 plays/playlets some of which are Lancham, Kaladharmam, Karmasakshi, Sandhyaragam, Athaniki Atoo Itoo, etc. The play Kaladharmam, won the best awards in many Parishats at the State / National level has been staged at All India Telugu Conference, Bangalore on 11 March 1990. He has written for Television scripts such as Sneha 13 episodes (ETV Telugu Channel), RagamMarinaPata (Doordarshan), Vaalupoddu (Saptagiri Channel)

As a film writer, he has written for films such as Kalikalam, Surigadu, Preminchu, Mamaa Kodalu, Akka Bagunnava, etc. Received 2002 Golden Nandi Award of Andhra Pradesh Government for Preminchu movie. Suragadu Cinema has been selected for the China Film Festival and Indian Panorama. Surigadu was remade into a Hindi movie "Santaan". Kalikalam movie on the basis of Kaladharmam has been reproduced into Indian languages : Tamil, Kannada, Oriya, Bengali and Marathi.

He has received the prestigious Literary Award ' Telugu Sahithi Puraskaram' for his play 'Kaladharmam' from Telugu University in the year 1990 and many awards such as Madras Kalasagar Awards, Vamsi Berkeley Award, South Indian Film Fans Association Awards.

== Filmography ==
Sriraj is credited with scripts for 15 feature films, 'Kalikaalam', 'Surigadu' (ranked as the best at the Indian panorama 1993 and was selected for China Film Fest in the same year), 'Preminchu' which won AP Bangaru Nandi award in 2001, 'Rajeswari Kalyanam', 'Akka Baagunnava' and the likes. Not only that, the retakes of 'Santhan' in Hindi, 'Kalikaalam' in Tamil, Kannada, Maraathi, Bengali and Oriya and 'Surigadu' in Tamil and Hindi were hits at the box office.

=== Writer ===
- Kalikalam (Telugu) : 1991 - Story
- Surigadu (Telugu) : 1992 - Dialogue, Story
- Attaku Koduku Mamaku Alludu (Telugu) : 1993
- Maama-Kodalu (Telugu) : 1993
- Appalee Manasa (Marathi) : 1993
- Kumkuma Bhagya (Kannada) : 1993
- Santhaan (Hindi) : 1993 - Story
- Vennela (Telugu) : 1994
- Antee Choori Thontee Katte (Oriya) : 1993
- Kalikaal (Bengali) : 1993
- Thapassu (Telugu) : 1995
- Akka Bagunnava (Telugu) : 1997
- Speed Dancer (Telugu) : 1999
- Rajeswari Kalyanam (Telugu) : 1995
- Preminchu (Telugu) : 2001 - Story
- Maaji Aayee (Marathi): 2008

=== Television ===
- Sneha (13 Episode Serial) - ETV 29 August 1995 to 28 November 1995
- Ragam marina Paata (Single Episode)
- Mandakini (Single Episode)

=== Books ===
- Lancham (Playlet)
- Okka Kshanam (Compilation of Short stories)
- Chukkalaseema (Short stories)
- Kaaladharmam (Playlet)
- Velugu Vakitloki (Anthology of Short Stories)
- Happy Father's Day (Short story)
