= Influencer Life =

Indian suspense short film

- Directed by: Tanmai Rastogi
- Written by: Anirudh Singh; Elvin Raja; Pushaan Mukherjee
- Produced by: Mohit Rastogi; Kanika Sehgal; Zulfaquar Haider Torabi
- Starring: Amyra Dastur; Satish Ray
- Cinematography: Krish Makhija
- Edited by: Manish Jaitly
- Music by: Ishaan Chhabra
- Production company: Four K Content
- Distributed by: Amazon Prime Video
- Release date: February 24, 2023
- Running time: 27 mins
- Country: India
- Language: Hindi

Influencer Life is a 2023 Indian Hindi-language suspense short film directed by Tanmai Rastogi. Produced under the banner of Four K Content, it stars Amyra Dastur and Satish Ray. It premiered on 24 February 2023 on Amazon miniTV.

== Cast ==
- Amyra Dastur as Kareena
- Satish Ray as Mr. Roast
- Disha Dande as Sohini
- Bardeep Dhiman as Vikram
- Anand Potdukhe as Sudhir
- Hriday Podwal as Tarun
- Vaibhav Chaturvedi as Shyam

== Production ==
The film was announced by Amazon Prime Video featuring Amyra Dastur and Satish Ray. The trailer of the film was released on 22 February 2023.

== Reception ==
Sunidhi Prajapat of OTTPlay rated the film 2/5 stars. Archika Khurana of Times of india gave the film 2.5/5 stars.
