= Mr. Medhavi =

2008 Indian film directed by G. Neelakanta Reddy

- Directed by: G. Neelakanta Reddy
- Written by: G. Neelakanta Reddy
- Produced by: Bodduluri Rama Rao
- Starring: Raja; Genelia D'Souza; Sonu Sood
- Cinematography: Suneel Reddy
- Edited by: K. V. Nagireddy
- Music by: Chakri
- Production company: Life Style Art Pictures
- Release date: 26 January 2008
- Country: India
- Language: Telugu

Mr. Medhavi (English translation: Mr. Genius) is a 2008 Indian Telugu romantic drama film, directed by G. Neelakanta Reddy. The film stars Raja, Genelia D'Souza and Sonu Sood.

== Plot ==
A young Vishwak (Raja) meets Swetha (Genelia) who comes from Canada on a vacation to her grandmother's place. She goes to school for the time being at the local school, where she meets Vishwak. That's when a one-sided love blossoms for Vishwak and he grows in love with Swetha.

However, given his humble background, life teaches him to be calculated in whatever he does. He soon masters the art of making the best for himself out of any given situation. Destiny brings him to the company that is owned by Swetha's father. Here, the old friends meet once again. But this time around, Swetha is the boss's daughter and dreams of setting up a pharmaceutical company. That's when Swetha and Vishwak get to work and spend time together.

While Vishwak works his way towards making Swetha love him, she springs a surprise on him by announcing that she is head over heels in love with Sidarth (Sonu Sood), a millionaire-turned-HR guru. Seeing his game plan backfire, Vishwak tries his best to take Swetha's mind off Sidarth. But the more he tries, the more she is convinced she has found her ideal man.

Will Vishwak gain or lose his love?

== Cast ==
- Raja as Vishwaksen
- Genelia D'Souza as Swetha
- Sonu Sood as Siddharth
- Bhargavi as Sheela
- Tanikella Bharani as Vishwaksen's Master
- Brahmanandam as Siddharth's uncle
- Suman as Krishna Kumar, Swetha's father
- Dharmavarapu Subramanyam as Chittaranjan
- MS Narayana as Krishnamurthy
- Suman Setty as Zakir, Vishwaksen's friend
- Sudha
- Hema as Vani, Swetha's mother
- Ranadhir Reddy as Rakesh
- Gundu Sudarshan as Cashier at Vishwaksen's office
- Gundu Hanumantha Rao in a cameo appearance as Police Officer
- Ambati Srinivas as Appu, office boy

== Soundtrack ==
The soundtrack was composed by Chakri.

Track listing
No.	Title	Lyrics	Singer(s)	Length
1.	"Kallu Kallatho"	Kandikonda	K. S. Chithra	4:38
2.	"Neeli Kanula Chinadana"	Kandikonda	S. P. B. Charan, Kousalya	5:13
3.	"Kala Kaadhuga"	Kandikonda	Chakri	6:47
4.	"Neeti Chinuku"	Kandikonda	Harish Raghavendra, Sumangali	3:59
5.	"Ningi Nela"	Kandikonda	Chakri	4:20
6.	"O Maguva"	Bhuvana Chandra	Naveen, Suchitra	4:42
Total length:				29:39

== Reception ==
A critic from Idlebrain.com rated the film 3 1/4 out of 5 and wrote that "The film starts with an interesting note. The kids episode is impressive. First half is decent. The second half has some dull moments, but the climax twist makes it up for sagging second half". A critic from Sify rated the film three out of five wrote that "Neelakanta's story is plain, but, the screenplay is arresting. His direction is trendy. The audiences will not feel bored at any point of time in the film. He used the technique of first person narration from start to finish, showing the scenes aptly. The episodes showing the growth of both the hero and heroine from their childhood to youth are simply superb". A critic from Rediff.com gave the film the same rating and wrote that "credit should be given to the director for his characterisation and narrative technique. He etches the characters well with the female lead getting equal footage".
