= Surya (Telugu actor) =

Telugu actor and Telugu comedian

- Born: Surya Kumar Bhagawan Das; 27 July 1957 (age 69); Pune, Maharashtra, India
- Occupations: Actor, dubbing artist
- Years active: 1985-present
- Spouse: Anita Sylvia Bhagawan Das

Surya Kumar Bhagawan Das (born 27 July 1957), known mononymously as Surya, is an Indian actor who appears in Telugu films.

Surya started his film career as an actor in Vikram (1986). He has been awarded four Nandi awards in his acting career spanning thirty-five years, two for TV performances as best villain (Preminchu, Premalo Jeevinchu) and best supporting actor (Janani Janmabhoomi) and two for film performances in films Sindhooram and Show. In Show, he played the male lead opposite Manjula. This performance brought him a special jury Nandi award in 2001. Surya has acted in more than 600 films and television episodes till date.

== Early life ==
Surya's father Lieutenant Colonel R. D. Bhagawan Das and mother Prabhavathi and the family moved to Hyderabad and started a school called 'Trinity Public School'. He was a teacher for 28 years and for several years his teaching and acting jobs ran concurrently. He joined the second batch of Students from Madhu Film Acting School (1984) after completing Bachelor of Arts in English literature and Bachelor of Education and was awarded the gold medal for most outstanding student.

== Awards ==
Nandi Awards

- Best Supporting Actor – Sindhooram (1997)
- Special Jury Award – Show (2001)

== Filmography ==
=== Telugu ===
1. Vikram (1986)
2. Kaliyuga Pandavulu (1986)
3. Brahma Rudrulu (1986)
4. Rao Gari Illu (1988)
5. Niyantha (1991)
6. Lathi (1992)
7. Sindhooram (1997)
8. Gamyam (1998) as Surya
9. Police (1999)
10. Panchadara Chilaka (1999)
11. Anaganaga Oka Ammai (1999)
12. Thammudu (1999)
13. Premaku Velayara (1999)
14. Sambayya (1999)
15. Hands Up (2000)
16. Jayam Manadera (2000)
17. Sivanna (2000)
18. Manasu Paddanu Kaani (2000)
19. Nuvvu Vastavani (2000)
20. Mrugaraju (2001)
21. Raa (2001)
22. Takkari Donga (2002)
23. Premaku Swagatam (2002)
24. Chandravamsam (2002)
25. Neetho Cheppalani (2002)
26. Show (2002)
27. Lagna Patrika (2002)
28. Gemeni (2002)
29. Johnny (2003)
30. Kabaddi Kabaddi (2003)
31. Simhadri (2003)
32. Vasantam (2003)
33. Charminar (2003)
34. Donga Ramudu and Party (2003) as Manmadha Rao
35. Avuna (2003)
36. Nee Manasu Naaku Telusu (2003)
37. Shankar Dada MBBS (2004)
38. Puttintiki Ra Chelli (2004)
39. Leela Mahal Center (2004)
40. Orey Pandu (2005)
41. Youth (2005)
42. Athanokkade (2005)
43. Chhatrapati (2005)
44. Naa Oopiri (2005)
45. Party (2006)
46. Valliddari Vayasu Padahare (2006)
47. Evadaithe Nakenti (2007)
48. Chiruta (2007)
49. Kick (2009)
50. Pistha (2009)
51. Magadheera (2009)
52. Josh (2009)
53. Adbutha Vaidyam Ayurvedam (2009)
54. Ye Maaya Chesave (2010) as Roy Thomas
55. Srimathi Kalyanam (2010)
56. Nenu Naa Rakshasi (2011)
57. Brahmi Gadi Katha (2011)
58. Sudigadu (2012)
59. Cameraman Gangatho Rambabu (2012)
60. Aravind 2 (2013)
61. Sahasam (2013)
62. Om 3D (2013)
63. 1: Nenokkadine (2014)
64. Hrudayam Ekkadunnadi (2014)
65. Power (2014)
66. Oohalu Gusagusalade (2014)
67. Yevadu (2014)
68. Paathshala (2014)
69. Erra Bus (2014)
70. Malli Malli Idi Rani Roju (2015)
71. The Bells (2015) as Ram Narayan
72. Srimanthudu (2015)
73. Jatha Kalise (2015)
74. Run (2016)
75. Patel S. I. R. (2017)
76. LIE (2017)
77. Jawaan (2017)
78. Bhaagamathie (2018) as CBI Officer
79. Hyderabad Love Story (2018)
80. Bharat Ane Nenu (2018)
81. Saakshyam (2018)
82. Saaho (2018)
83. Ramabrahmam (2018)
84. Anthaku Minchi (2018)
85. Subrahmanyapuram (2018)
86. Udyama Simham (2019)
87. Rakshasudu (2019)
88. Sarileru Neekevvaru (2020)
89. Cycle (2021)
90. Play Back (2021)
91. Missing (2021)
92. Mugguru Monagallu (2021)
93. Raja Vikramarka (2021)
94. Sebastian P.C. 524 (2022)
95. Clap (2022)
96. Radhe Shyam (2022)
97. Suraapanam (2022)
98. Waltair Veerayya (2023) as retired officer Murthy
99. Meter (2023)
100. Custody (2023) as Head Constable Mani
101. Asalu (2023) as Chakravarthy
102. IQ (2023)
103. Tiger Nageswara Rao (2023)
104. Eagle (2024)
105. Masthu Shades Unnai Raa (2024) as Machine Das
106. Dear Nanna (2024) as Ravi
107. Nindha (2024) as Chandrasekhar
108. Mercy Killing (2024)
109. Zebra (2024) as Abbu
110. Coffee with a Killer (2025)
111. Show Time (2025)
112. Trimukha (2025)
113. Constable (2025)
114. Son Of (2026)

=== Tamil ===
1. House Full (1999)
2. Mudhalvan (1999)
3. Enakku 20 Unakku 18 (2003)
4. Bhaagamathie (2018) as CBI Officer
5. Custody (2023)

=== Other languages ===
1. Nayak (2001; Hindi)
2. Olave Mandara (2011; Kannada)

=== Dubbing artist ===
Film	Year	Actor
Super	2005	Piyush Mishra
