= Vivaha Bhojanambu (2021 film) =

- Release poster
- Directed by: Ram Abbaraju
- Story by: Bhanu Bogavarapu
- Produced by: P. Kiran; K. S. Sinish; Sundeep Kishan
- Starring: Satya; Sundeep Kishan; Sudarshan
- Cinematography: S. Manikandan
- Edited by: Chota K. Prasad
- Music by: AniVee
- Production companies: Anandi Art Creations; Soldiers Factory; Venkatadri Express
- Distributed by: SonyLIV
- Release date: 27 August 2021
- Country: India
- Language: Telugu

Vivaha Bhojanambu (transl. Wedding feast) is a 2021 Indian Telugu-language comedy film directed by Ram Abbaraju. The film stars Satya, Sundeep Kishan and Aarjavee. It is produced by K. S. Sinish and Sundeep Kishan. It is Sundeep Kishan's third film as a producer. This film was premiered on SonyLiv on 27 August 2021.

The story is about a miser whose rich in-laws are stuck at his home during the initial COVID-19 lockdown in India.

== Plot ==
Anitha hails from a rich family that owns numerous hotels and lives extravagantly. Mahesh, her lover, is an insurance agent who will do anything to save a little money. When her family first meets him, they don't like his appearance and are shocked by his sparse house, with Anitha's father Radhakrishna being particularly antagonistic towards him. However, Anitha's grandfather approves of their marriage as they share the same caste. As the COVID-19 pandemic in India ramps up, the marriage arrangements are scaled down to Mahesh's delight and they have an elegant but simple wedding with only their two families in attendance. Anitha's grandfather gets injured and has to stay for a couple days. When the COVID-19 lockdown in India is announced with only hours notice, the in-laws try to leave, but a tyre puncture forces them to stay at Mahesh's house during the lockdown.

Antics ensue as Mahesh is shocked by the cost of feeding his in-laws and their lifestyle, his in-laws are irritated by his stinginess and poor conditions inside the home, and everyone has to deal with COVID and the lockdown. During Deepavali celebrations, someone asks how Mahesh and Anitha met. Mahesh got into an accident, and his blood group is rare. Anitha donated her blood to him anonymously. Later, he had to take an English night class which she coincidentally taught. After he finds out what she did, he follows her around and she reciprocates his love. In the present, Mahesh tries to smuggle his in-laws back home using a fake ambulance operated by Nellore Prabha; however, his anger issues, rash driving and hallucinations cause them to get in an accident and get detained by police, forcing Mahesh to bail them out at the cost of his gold necklace.

Over time, Radhakrishna suspects that Mahesh is not really his parents' son; after setting up a trap, it is revealed that Mahesh is an orphan who has been living with his friend, who is the biological son of his "parents". The reason why Mahesh is stingy is because he grew up very poor and wants to save up enough money for a house of his own. Radhakrishna threatens to reveal the ruse to Anitha's grandfather, a strong believer in caste, but decides not to due to his heart problems. Later on, the hotel manager calls Anitha's grandfather and reveals that one of the employees stole all of their money, giving him a shock and causing him to suffer a heart attack. As all of their contacts refuse to pay due to pandemic issues, Mahesh pays for the surgery using the funds he had saved for a house, but Radhakrishna still rebuffs him. Anitha calls him out and points out that Mahesh gave his money away without a second thought and thus is the right person for her. Finally, the lockdown ends after some more weeks and the family can go back home. Mahesh comes along, but when their vehicle is hit by Nellore Prabha, now cured of his hallucinations, Radhskrishna finally acknowledges Mahesh as his son-in-law as they fight off a still angry Prabha.

== Cast ==
- Satya as Pathiginjala Mahesh
- Aarjavee Raj as Anitha
- Srikanth Iyengar as Radhakrishna, Anitha's father
- Sudarshan as Mahesh's friend
- Thummala Narasimha Reddy as Jayakrishna, Radhakrishna's younger brother and Anitha's uncle
- Subbaraya Sharma as Rajarao, Radhakrishna's father and Anitha's grandfather
- Harsha Chemudu as Varadaraju alias "Influence" Raja
- Sivannarayana Naripeddi as Mahesh' father
- Kalpa Latha as Mahesh's mother
- Madhumani as Radhakrishna's younger sister, Jayakrishna's elder sister, and Anitha's aunt
- Nitya Sree as Anitha's younger sister
- Kireeti Damaraju
- Dayanand Reddy as sub inspector
- Sundeep Kishan in an extended cameo appearance as Nellore Prabha

== Production ==
Actor Sundeep Kishan announced in August 2020 his third production titled Vivaha Bhojanambu, named after a song from Mayabazar (1957), and a restaurant chain in Hyderabad which he owns. The film is produced in partnership with Sinish under the Anandi Art Creations, Soldiers Factory and Venkatadri Express banners. The film is directed by Ram Abbaraju from a story written by Bhanu Bogavarapu. S. ManiKandan is signed as the cinematographer while Chota K Prasad is the editor.

Principal photography of the film commenced on 1 September 2020.

== Soundtrack ==
Soundtrack of the film is released by Sony Music. Its first single was released on 3 February 2021. The music is composed by AniVee.

All music is composed by AniVee.

No.	Title	Lyrics	Singer (s)	Length
1.	"ABCD"	Kittu Vissapragada	Inno Genga	3:39
2.	"Devi Kalyana Vaibogame"	Kittu Vissapragada	Anthony Daasan, Chinmayi	3:07
3.	"What A Man"	Samrat	Chowrasta Ram	2:56

== Release ==
This film was premiered on SonyLiv on 27 August 2021.
