= Indian Beauty =

- Directed by: Shanti Kumar
- Screenplay by: Shanti Kumar, Kishore Dhara, Katherine Torpey
- Story by: Shanti Kumar
- Produced by: Shanti Kumar, Sanyasi Raju
- Starring: Collin Mcgee; Shaila Rao; Manish Dayal
- Cinematography: Suresh Rohin
- Edited by: Nagi Reddy
- Music by: Joy Kelvin
- Production company: Trinity International Entertainment
- Release dates: 26 August 2006 (India); 27 June 2008 (United States)
- Running time: 125 minutes
- Country: India; United States
- Languages: Telugu; English

Indian Beauty (released in the United States as On the Other Side) is a 2006 India romance film directed by Shanti Kumar. Shot in Telugu and English, the film features Collin Mcgee, Shaila Rao, and Manish Dayal.

== Plot ==
Indian culture interests Dave (Colin McGee). So he decides to work on its culture. Dave has a friend, Jack (Manish Dayal), who was born in America but has roots in India. Jack joins Dave on his project on Indian culture. Mr. Murthy, a friend of Jack's father, offers them a place to stay. Initially, Mr. and Mrs. Murthy are keen on taking Jack as their son-in-law, but noticing his American ways, they prefer a local boy, Vishal (Gopichand Lagadapati).

Mr. Murthy's daughter, Swapna, is also interested in Indian culture and hence decides to help Dave with his project. In the process of working, both Swapna and Dave are attracted to each other before they finally fall in love. Whether Swapna & Dave are finally successful in convincing the parents forms the rest of the story.

== Cast ==
- Collin Mcgee as Dave Pearson
- Saila Rao as Swapna
- Manish Dayal as Jayakrishna alias Jack
- Tanikella Bharani as himself
- Bramhanandam as himself
- Susan Slatin as Dave's grandmother
- Nakuul Mehta as Shekhar
- Gopichand Lagadapati as Vishal
- Jayalalita as herself
- Nagineedu as Vishal's father
- Sukruta Shankar as Radha
- Kadambari Kiran

== Production ==
The producer and director of the film, Shanti Kumar, selected Collin and Sai Rao (the granddaughter of Anjali Devi) for the lead roles, along with Manish Dayal. The film was released in the United States under the title On the Other Side. The film was selected as the best movie of the year 2007 at the Harlem International Film Festival in New York.

== Soundtrack ==
The songs are composed by Joy Kelvin.

Indian Beauty

Soundtrack album by Joy Kelvin
- Released: 2006
- Recorded: 2006
- Genre: Feature film soundtrack
- Length: 28:34
- Language: Telugu
- Label: Madhura

No.	Title	Singer(s)	Length
1.	"Priyathama"	Chitra, Priyasri	5:08
2.	"Summer"	Tippu, Priyasri, Prajesh	5:06
3.	"Holi"	Karthik, Anuradha Sriram	4:37
4.	"Sankranthi"	Anitha Krishna, Balaji	5:08
5.	"Dream Girl"		3:23
6.	"Re-mix"	Tippu, Priyasri, Madhulika	5:12
Total length:			28:34
