= Show (film) =

- Directed by: Neelakanta
- Written by: Neelakanta
- Produced by: Manjula Ghattamaneni
- Starring: Manjula Ghattamaneni; Surya
- Cinematography: Ravi Yadav
- Edited by: Anil Malnad
- Music by: Raaz
- Production company: Indira Productions
- Release date: 13 September 2002
- Language: Telugu
- Budget: ₹ 2.6 million

Show is a 2002 Indian Telugu-language experimental film written and directed by Neelakanta, starring Manjula Ghattamaneni and Surya. The film won National Film Award for Best Feature Film in Telugu and was premiered in the Indian Panorama section at the International Film Festival of India. Neelakanta received National Film Award for Best Screenplay for the film. The film also won three Nandi Awards.

== Plot ==
Ridhima, an executive of a Delhi-based pharmaceutical company, visits a remote village in Andhra Pradesh to make a deal on patents with a professor who invented a new drug. The professor leaves a note that he will return late as he has to attend to some urgent work and she should wait for his arrival. At that time, Madhav Rao, a junior advocate who supervises the event of patent selling, arrives there. Ridhima is a fun-loving, unmarried girl, and she has a boyfriend called Sanjay. Madhav Rao is frustrated about his profession, which he doesn't like, and he was a depressed married guy because of his taunting wife Sudha. In the professor's lonely resort, they become friends. Then, to kill time, Ridhima asks Madhav that she will give her month's salary ₹30,000 to anyone who entertains her at least an hour. Then, Madhav makes a prank on her acting as a psycho which hurts Ridhima but they remain friends and she learns that Madhav once tried acting for five years but failed to achieve success in his career and became a junior advocate. Then, to kill some time, Madhav gives an idea to make a play of a husband and wife, which is going to divorce. But Ridhima doesn't show any interest in the play, but she accepts to kill time until the professor arrives. But the play stops by Madhav, which hurts him because of the disinterest of Ridhima in the play. After that, Ridhima apologises to Madhav, and he eventually accepts that Madhav makes a lavish lunch, which is full of favorites of Ridhima. After lunch, Ridhima says that she can't act, and then Madhav encourages her to develop confidence to make her act, and then they resume the same play.

According to the play, they name themselves as Sandhya and Subba Rao, who are going to discuss their relationship, which makes a patch up or going to an end on that resort. While in the acting Madhav remembers her wife Sudha's words coincidentally spoken by Sandhya, it frustrates him more. Slowly, he came out from the play, and he felt that it was going real and argued with her seriously. Then finally in the heated argument, Sandhya confesses that she is loving Sanjay and he is also waiting for her then Madhav asks about his son Shambu then frustrated Sandya replies to die both of them in a well. It makes Madhav angry and beats Sandhya mercilessly. Then Madhav confesses his love on her and how he compromised with his life for her. Then Ridhima realises it is not a drama and understands that Madhav became crazy and understands that his love on his wife. Then Madhav tries to kill himself, then to stop him Ridhima tries to make him realise that it was a drama by clapping on him for his actions, and the "Show" became an end then Madhav regains his senses and realises what he had done and apologises to her. Later, they both laugh a lot for their act and forgot about their situation. Meanwhile, the film ends with the professor eventually returning.

== Cast ==
- Manjula Ghattamaneni as Ridhima, an executive from a Delhi-based pharmaceutical company who plays Sandhya later becomes Sudha in the play
- Surya as Adv. Madhav Rao, a junior lawyer who plays Subbarao in the play
- Lakshmi Ratan as Professor Dr. Krishna Rao

== Reception ==
Idlebrain.com rated the film 4/5 and called the film "picture perfect." The praised the film's screenplay by adding that: "The screenplay of Show is excellent. Having just 2 main roles in the film and running the show for two hours is not an easy task. It needs excellent command on the script and perfect conviction in the subject."

Sankeetana Varma of the Film Companion writing about the film in February 2020 stated that: "This film [Show] doesn't work only as an eccentric experiment. It has moments of great depth and understanding." Varma also praised the performances of the lead cast by adding that, "..the actors, especially Manjula, feel like they're performing even when they're alone in the frame."

== Awards ==
National Film Awards

- 2003:National Film Award for Best Feature Film in Telugu
- 2003:National Film Award for Best Screenplay - Neelakanta

Nandi Awards

- 2003:Special Jury Award for Best Performance - Surya
- 2003: Special Jury Award for Producer - Manjula
- 2003: Best Screenplay Writer - Neelakanta
