= Manodu =

- Directed by: Priyadarshini Ram
- Written by: Priyadarshini Ram
- Produced by: Siddhartha & Sarada.
- Starring: Bharat; Radhika Joshi; Priyadarshini Ram
- Narrated by: Priyadarshini Ram
- Cinematography: T. Surendra Reddy
- Music by: Prasanth K.
- Release date: 24 February 2006
- Country: India
- Language: Telugu

Manodu (transl. One of us) is a 2006 Indian Telugu action-drama film directed by Priyadarshini Ram in his directorial debut and starring Bharat, Radhika and himself. The film was released on 24 February 2006. Priyadarshini Ram won Nandi Special Jury Award for this film (2006).

== Plot ==
The film narrates the story of a young man Viswam (Bharat) who rises from utter poverty to riches, by unfair means like charging commission from creditors for recovering their loans, though advised against it by his parents and his friends. All that he treats as important is money and thinks that there is nothing he cannot achieve with money. Saying so, he walks out of home. What kind of problems he and his like-minded friends face is the subject of the film. These friends work under the leadership of one Raghu (Priyadarshini Ram). Obviously they are in a 'dandha', a name often used for collecting money by force to enjoy life. 'Mirchi' - a girl with a story of her own behind her, lives with Ram and half a dozen members of the dandha, two of whom are girls. Most of the dialogues in these scenes show their wayward behavior and carefree life. Their solutions to problems too are strange. When a girl is gang raped – as the young man pretending love for her takes her to a room to rape her, ten others in the room too rape her - the leader orders that the one who pretended love for the girl to marry her. This he feels will be a punishment for the young man because it would make him suffer as he would recall every day what he had done to her.

There are many such other strange punishments. But not always do the members of the dandha display this kind of social consciousness and sense of justice. They charge huge sums for settling issues. Even the police department and its high officials are at beck and call of this gang. A rival gang starts functioning. They await a chance to wipe off this gang. They get the chance when Viswam falls in love with a girl (Radhika). He is the son of a schoolteacher, respected by persons from all sections of life – right from the police to the bureaucracy. When the police arrest Viswam, the father to get him released, runs from pillar to post only to learn in the end how bad his son is, and how he extracts money from others. He is a disappointed man and dies of a heart attack. The commissioner of police,(Nayaz) also a student of the teacher, helps his son's release. This begins the destruction of the network he works for and his realization that this kind of negative approach would never be acceptable to society.

== Cast ==
- Bharat as Vishwam
- Radhika Joshi as Naina
- Priyadarshini Ram as Ravi
- K. J. Sharma
- Ratna Kumari
- Viswendar Reddy
- Nayaz Noor
- Krishnudu

== Production ==
The film stars sixty newcomers. The film's tagline "What's the climax?" became popular prior to the film's release.

== Reception ==
A critic from The Hindu wrote that "Manodu inspires us to look honestly at ourselves, our passions, and our actions in society". A critic from Full Hyderabad wrote that "Watching Manodu requires the maturity that makes people appreciate the work of first-timers though it doesn’t make the cut, and or the work of those who you think cannot get better than this".
