= Pokiri =

2006 Indian film by Puri Jagannadh

- Theatrical release poster
- Directed by: Puri Jagannadh
- Written by: Puri Jagannadh
- Produced by: Puri Jagannadh; Manjula Ghattamaneni
- Starring: Mahesh Babu; Ileana D'Cruz; Prakash Raj
- Cinematography: Shyam K. Naidu
- Edited by: Marthand K. Venkatesh
- Music by: Mani Sharma
- Production companies: Indira Productions; Vaishno Academy
- Distributed by: Vaishno Academy
- Release date: 28 April 2006
- Running time: 168 minutes
- Country: India
- Language: Telugu
- Budget: ₹10–12 crore (Note: Sify reported the film's budget as ₹10 crore, whereas The Hindu reported the film's budget as ₹12 crore.)
- Box office: est. ₹70 crore

Pokiri (transl. Rogue) is a 2006 Indian Telugu-language action comedy thriller film written and directed by Puri Jagannadh. The film was produced by Jagannadh and Manjula Ghattamaneni by their respective production companies Vaishno Academy and Indira Productions. The film stars Mahesh Babu, Ileana D'Cruz, Prakash Raj, Nassar, Ashish Vidyarthi and Sayaji Shinde. In the film, a local goon whose killer instincts earns him not only his girlfriend's disapproval and a corrupt cop's enmity, but also the attention of a wanted crime boss.

The film was made on a budget of around ₹12 crore. principal photography commenced in November 2005 and lasted until April 2006. Most of the film was shot in and around Hyderabad and Chennai, except for a song which was shot at the province of Phuket in Thailand and the city of Bangkok. Shyam K. Naidu was the film's cinematographer, and it was edited by Marthand K. Venkatesh. The soundtrack and film score were composed by Mani Sharma.

Pokiri was released on 28 April 2006. The film grossed over ₹70 crore worldwide in its initial theatrical run and was declared an Industry Hit while remaining as the highest-grossing Telugu film for three years until it was surpassed by Magadheera in 2009. It also became the highest-grossing South Indian film in its original run, surpassing Chandramukhi, and became the first South Indian film to gross over ₹60 and ₹70 crore in a single language. The film altered the landscape of Telugu commercial cinema. It solidified Mahesh Babu's status as a star, transitioning his image from a "charming youth icon" to a formidable "mass hero". Similarly, the film's success established Puri Jagannadh as a "star director," known for his sharp, edgy dialogues and unique characterisations that would influence a decade of action films.

The film was also one of the fourteen southern Indian films to be screened at the International Indian Film Academy Awards (IIFA) Film festival in 2006. The film won five Nandi Awards and two Filmfare Awards. It was remade in Tamil as Pokkiri (2007), in Hindi as Wanted (2009), in Kannada as Porki (2010)

== Plot ==
In Hyderabad, two rival mafia gangs headed by Dubai-based gangster Ali Bhai and a local goon named Narayana resort to criminal activities such as extortion, contract killings, and coercion to take control of the city. Newly appointed Deputy Commissioner Sayyad Mohammad Pasha Qadri focuses on making the city safer by working on arresting all of them. Pandu, a thug working for money and living in Hyderabad along with his friends, is hired by Narayana to beat up Ali Bhai's henchman Mallesh. Pandu later joins Ali Bhai's gang after being offered money to join. Pandu falls in love with Shruthi, an aerobics teacher, who rejects his advances. Shruthi lives with her widowed mother and brother and her neighbor Brahmi, a software engineer who pesters her to marry him. A corrupt sub-inspector named Pasupathy, who works for Ali Bhai, lusts after Shruthi. He is determined to make her his mistress, undeterred by Sruthi's and her mother's multiple rejections. After killing Narayana's henchman, Pandu is confronted by Pasupathy and is able to prevent Shruthi from being molested. Shruthi meets him the next day to thank him, and starts to fall in love with Pandu after spending sometime with him. Shruthi tells Pandu about Pasupathy forcing her to be his mistress which angers Pandu.

After being tipped off by Brahmi, Pasupathy confronts Pandu who casually reveals his knowledge of Pasupathy's role in a constable's death during an encounter with a gangster, and warns him to stay away from Shruthi. To escape from Pasupathy's advances, Shruthi meets Pandu and proposes to him, but they're interrupted by an attack by Narayana's henchmen. Pandu brutally dispatches all of them, shocking Shruthi. After revealing his true colors, Pandu urges Shruthi to rethink her feelings. To ensure no decent family ever thinks of marrying her, Pasupathy arranges for some thugs to stage a mock sexual assault of Shruthi. Upon learning of this, an enraged Pandu beats up Pasupathy in a market without revealing himself, then anonymously warns him that if he ever finds out he was responsible, he'll kill him personally. Pandu is eventually tipped off when the same thugs try to molest Shruthi on a train, and brutally kills them. Shruthi eventually admits her love for Pandu despite his violent ways and the risk involved.

Meanwhile, Ali Bhai visits Hyderabad and assassinates Narayana, and meets Pandu to discuss the murder of a minister by blowing up children's balloons. Pandu rejects the plan as it would involve killing innocents. In the middle of their argument, the police raid the club and arrest Ali Bhai. Ali Bhai's gang members retaliate by kidnapping Qadri's daughter, drugging her and creating a lewd video of her which they threaten to release to the media if Ali Bhai is not released, forcing the embattled Qadri to release Ali Bhai, after which they release the video anyway, to Pandu's disgust. However, in her drugged state, Qadri's daughter inadvertently reveals that her father had placed an undercover officer as a mole in Ali Bhai's gang. With the help of Pasupathy, Ali Bhai finds out that the undercover IPS officer, Krishna Manohar, is the son of a retired Inspector Suryanarayana. Confronting Suryanarayana, Ali Bhai kills Pandu's friend and Suryanarayana's son, only for Suryanarayana to reveal that it was actually his adopted son, Ajay. Ali Bhai then kills Suryanarayana to lure the real Krishna Manohar. When Krishna Manohar actually turns up, everyone, especially Shruthi and Pasupathy are shocked to see that he is none other than Pandu. After Suryanarayana and Ajay's funeral, Pandu interrogates Pasupathy and has him call Ali Bhai to find out his location: Binny Mills. After having Pasupathy drive him there, Pandu proceeds to dispatch Ali Bhai's men one by one, and finally confronts Ali Bhai. Forcibly reminded of Qadri's warning about not meeting the right guy, Ali Bhai tries to reason with Pandu and attempts to kill him, only for Pandu to slice his throat, killing him. After calling Qadri to inform him that his daughter's safe, Pandu shocks Pasupathy by informing Qadri of his death. A confused Pasupathy draws his gun on him, but is shot dead by Pandu who reminds him that okka sari nenu commit ayithe naa maata nene vinanu (transl. Once I commit to anything, I won't even listen to myself), referencing the earlier threat he made to Pasupathy.

== Cast ==
- Mahesh Babu as Pandu/Krishna Manohar IPS
- Ileana D'Cruz as Shruthi
- Prakash Raj as Ali Bhai
- Nassar as Suryanarayana
- Ashish Vidyarthi as SI Pasupathy
- Sayaji Shinde as DCP Sayed Mohammad Pasha Qadri
- Brahmanandam as Brahmi
- Ali as Beggars' Association President
- Venu Madhav as Beggars' Association General Secretary
- Satya Prakash as Narayana
- G. V. Sudhakar Naidu as Banda Ganesh
- Subbaraju as "Indira Nagar" Mallesh
- Ajay as Ajay
- Master Bharath as Sruthi's brother
- Sudha as Lakshmi, Sruthi's mother
- Krishnudu as Pandu's friend
- Satyam Rajesh as Pandu's friend
- Prudhviraj as Vishwanath
- Narsing Yadav as Sattanna, a gangster
- Bandla Ganesh as a reporter
- Mumaith Khan cameo appearance in the song "Ippatikinka"
- Chandana Lakshmi Narasimha Rao (Chitti) as doctor

== Production ==
=== Development ===
In 2004, after Andhrawala's commercial failure, its director Puri Jagannadh planned a film titled Sri Krishnudu from Surabhi Company starring Chiranjeevi in the lead role. He later decided that explaining the story to Chiranjeevi, talking him into accepting the role, and filming the movie, would be a long, tiring process. He chose instead to revive the script of Uttam Singh S/O Suryanarayana which he had written during the production of Badri (2000). He approached Pawan Kalyan to play the lead role, but he declined it. Later, he approached Ravi Teja who agreed to play the lead; Nagendra Babu was to produce the film. However, Teja was approached by Cheran, an award-winning director, to remake the 2004 Tamil film Autograph in Telugu. Teja was eager to be involved in the remake as he liked the original very much. As a result, the production Uttam Singh S/O Suryanarayana was temporarily shelved. Jagannadh meanwhile directed and produced 143 (2004). Teja had backed out of participating in it, citing scheduling conflicts with other existing commitments. Jagannadh wanted to experiment by casting Sonu Sood in the lead role, but this too failed to materialise.

On 3 November 2004, Jagannadh met Mahesh Babu at the Taj Hotel in Hyderabad to outline the film's plot. It told the story of Uttam Singh, an undercover police officer, infiltrating a mafia gang as a criminal, with the intention of killing its kingpin. Babu liked the script but suggested Jagannadh tweak the script's backdrop to suit the Telugu-speaking peoples' sensibilities. Jagannadh agreed and also replaced the existing title with Pokiri. Babu wanted the film's production to begin in 2005 allowing him to complete his current commitments. While he waited for Babu, Jagannadh directed Nagarjuna in Super (2005). While reworking the script, Jagannadh took inspiration from Marana Mrudangam (1988) and State Rowdy (1989). Pokiri was produced jointly by Jagannadh and Manjula Ghattamaneni's production companies, Vaishno Academy and Indira Productions respectively, on a budget of ₹10–12 crore.

=== Cast and crew ===
For Pokiri, Babu sported a longer hair style than in his previous films and shed five kilograms of weight. He used a new wardrobe and the same pair of shoes throughout the film. Jagannadh wanted to cast Ayesha Takia as the female lead. Due to a last minute change, the makers opted to replace Takia and considered several actresses including Deepika Padukone. Jagannadh approached Parvati Melton to play the female lead. She declined the offer because, at that time, her parents were against her decision to become an actress. He also approached Kangana Ranaut who could not accept the role because of scheduling conflicts with the filming of her scenes in Gangster (2006). After seeing stills of Ileana in her Telugu debut Devadasu (2006), Jagannadh signed her as the female lead since he needed a girl who looked like a teenager to play the role of the aerobics teacher.

Prakash Raj and Ashish Vidyarthi were cast as the film's primary antagonists. Raj played a mafia kingpin and Vidyarthi played a corrupt police officer, a villain's role he finds more fun to play than that of a hero. Sayaji Shinde and Nassar played the two other principal characters in the film. Jyothi Rana played the role of the mafia kingpin's moll, marking her debut in Telugu cinema. Isai and Subbaraju portrayed negative roles as well, with the former also making his debut in Telugu cinema. Ali played the role of a beggar and shared screen-space with Brahmanandam and Venu Madhav. Jagannadh added this trio to the film to provide situational humour. Master Bharath played the role of Ileana's brother. Mumaith Khan performed an item number in the film.

Jagannadh wrote the film's story, screenplay and dialogue with Meher Ramesh assisting him as script associate. Though having worked with Chakri many times in the past, at Babu's suggestion, Jagannadh instead chose Mani Sharma to compose the film's music. Shyam K. Naidu was the film's cinematographer and Marthand K. Venkatesh its editor. Chinna and Krishna were the film's art director and executive producer respectively.

=== Filming ===
Pokiri was shot predominantly in and around Hyderabad, especially in the Annapurna Studios, the aluminium factory near Gachibowli, Gayathri Hills and the Golconda Fort in 100 working days, from November 2005 to April 2006. Most of the scenes were shot in a single take though it took time for Babu to adjust to Jagannadh's style of filmmaking. Chennai-based stylist Chaitanya Rao designed the costume styling for Babu and Ileana. By late February 2006, eighty percent of the film shoot had been completed with the film's climax and two songs remaining. This made it Babu's fastest shot Telugu film with him in the lead role.

The song "Gala Gala" was shot in the province of Phuket in Thailand, and the city of Bangkok. Prior to the filming of the song "Jagadame", Shyam K. Naidu was busy on the set of Munna (2007) and was unable to shoot it so cinematographer K. V. Guhan, who had worked on Babu's Athadu (2005), was recruited instead. The film's climax sequences were shot in March 2006 at the defunct Binny Mills located in Chennai under the supervision of FEFSI Vijayan. He suggested that Jagannadh include a scene where Prakash Raj fails to hear anything for a while after he is hit by Babu during the climax sequence.

Babu stated in an interview that he had to shoot the film's climax and two songs continuously for thirty-eight days, adding that he had to visit a hospital to be treated for shoulder pain. During the shooting of an underwater sequence, a few electrical lights were used. The electricians changed the lines, creating a short circuit which resulted in the death of one of the unit members. Babu had gotten out of the pool two seconds before the accident happened, which he termed a "miracle".

Ileana D'Cruz's T-shirt which was printed with "I May Not Be Perfect But Parts of Me Are Pretty Awesome" had earlier been used in Puri Jagannadh's Hello Premistara (2007).

== Music ==
Pokiri

Soundtrack album by Mani Sharma
- Released: 26 March 2006
- Recorded: 2005–2006
- Genre: Feature film soundtrack
- Length: 28:01
- Label: Aditya Music
- Producer: Mani Sharma

Mani Sharma chronology
Veerabhadra (2006)	Pokiri (2006)	Ashok (2006)

The official soundtrack of Pokiri was composed by Mani Sharma, with lyrics written by Bhaskarabhatla, Kandikonda, and Viswa. Jagannadh wanted Sharma to compose six songs, with two duets between the lead pair, three solo numbers by the male lead, and an item number. During the shoot of Sivamani (2003), Jagannadh listened to the song "Listen to the Falling Rain," which sounded like the song "Gala Gala Parutunna Godarila" from the Telugu film Gowri (1974). He later came to learn that the latter song was inspired by the former, and he decided to reuse the same tune with modernised instruments and different lyrics. Sharma was accused of copying the tune of the song "Jaleo" composed by Ricky Martin and "Rapture" by iiO for the songs "Devuda" sung by Naveen and "Dole Dole" sung by Ranjith and Suchitra, respectively.

The film's soundtrack, marketed by Aditya Music, was released on 26 March 2006, at Hotel Viceroy in Hyderabad with Babu's father Krishna attending the event as the guest of honour. Sify called the soundtrack a peppy one and chose "Gala Gala" as the pick of the album.

Track list
No.	Title	Lyrics	Singer(s)	Length
1.	"Devuda"	Bhaskarabhatla	Naveen	04:32
2.	"Dole Dole"	Viswa	Suchitra, Ranjith	04:43
3.	"Gala Gala"	Kandikonda	Nihal	04:35
4.	"Ippatikinka"	Bhaskarabhatla	Suchitra, Khushi Murali	04:38
5.	"Jagadame"	Kandikonda	Kunal Ganjawala	04:31
6.	"Choododdantunna"	Bhaskarabhatla	Karthik, Mahalakshmi Iyer	05:02
Total length:				28:01

== Release ==
=== Theatrical ===
Pokiri was scheduled for a worldwide release on 21 April 2006. Due to delays in post-production activities, the film's release was postponed to 27 April 2006, clashing with the release of Bangaram and Veerabhadra. The film received an 'A' (Adults Only) certificate from the CBFC for containing obscene sequences and excessive violence. Dil Raju's Sri Venkateswara Creations, Mallikharjuna films and Great India films acquired the theatrical distribution rights of Nizam, (Note: For film trade purposes, the Nizam region includes the three districts of Kalaburagi, Bidar, and Raichur in Karnataka and seven districts in the Marathwada region including Aurangabad, Latur, Nanded, Parbhani, Beed, Jalna and Osmanabad apart from the state of Telangana.) Ceded and overseas regions respectively. Pokiri was one of the fourteen southern Indian films that were screened at the IIFA film festival 2006 held at the Dubai International Convention Centre in Dubai, United Arab Emirates.

== Re-release ==
Pokiri was re-released in theaters worldwide on 9 August 2022, coinciding with Babu's birthday, with remastered picture and sound, and grossing ₹1.7 crore during its re-run.

== Reception ==
Pokiri received positive reviews from critics with praise for its direction, screenwriting, dialogues, soundtrack, musical score, plot twist, action sequences and Mahesh Babu's performance.

=== Critical response ===
The Hindu wrote: "An out and out action flick, one can see the director's thirst to cash in on the audience craze for such films. Nevertheless it's Mahesh Babu's show all the way. Mahesh's understated performance in Pokiri allows him to effortlessly reclaim the title of a star, overshadowing more questionable recent career choices." Sify wrote "Pokiri was designed as a mass masala extravaganza which satisfies the undemanding viewers. Mahesh Babu has strong screen presence that works to the advantage of the film."

Rediff wrote "Sporting a new, rugged look, 'Prince' Mahesh Babu has stolen the show. He carries the film on his shoulders, consolidating his winning streak after last year's Athadu. Another highlight of the film is its well-choreographed action sequences (if you can digest the violence), which give it a slick look."

=== Box office ===
According to Sify, Pokiri took an "extraordinary" opening across the globe and was able to cash in on the four-day weekend holiday. Pokiri was released in a single screen, the Jayaprada theatre in Chennai, where 98.5% of seats were sold putting it in second place in the city's box office chart, which Sify called an "awesome" feat. The film completed a fifty-day run on 17 June 2006, in nearly 300 centres and had earned US$350,000 to become the highest grossing Telugu film in the United States. By July 2006, the film had earned approximately ₹35–40 crore and become the highest grossing Telugu film of all time. The film earned ₹11.70 crore in the Nizam region alone, breaking the previous record set in the region by Indra (2002) and earned approximately ₹2.5 crore at the United States box office.

The film completed a 100-day run in 200 centres and a 175-day run in 63 centres. The film completed a 200-day run in 15 centres, and a 365-day run at a theatre in Kurnool, becoming the first Telugu film to do so in the last two and a half decades. The film was screened in Bhagiratha theatre, Kurnool for 500 days at the rate of four shows per day and collected a share of ₹60 lakh. In its lifetime, Pokiri collected a distributor share of ₹42 crore at the global box office. The film was reported to have grossed over ₹70 crore, however some estimates, based on the distributor share of the film at the time, indicate that the global gross figure may have been up to ₹76 crore. It held that position until 2009 when Magadheera pushed it to second place after its nine-day run.

Pokiri grossed over ₹1.7 crore in its 2022 re-release.

=== Accolades ===
Ceremony	Category	Nominee	Result	Ref(s)
Nandi Awards	Best Popular Feature Film	Puri Jagannadh & Manjula Ghattamaneni	Won	
Nandi Awards	Best Editor	Marthand K. Venkatesh	Won	
Nandi Awards	Best Fight Master	FEFSI Vijayan	Won	
Nandi Awards	Best Male Dubbing Artist	P. Ravi Shankar	Won	
Nandi Awards	Best Audiographer	Radha Krishna	Won	
54th Filmfare Awards South	Best Director – Telugu	Puri Jagannadh	Won	
54th Filmfare Awards South	Best Actor – Telugu	Mahesh Babu	Won	
Santosham Film Awards	Santosham Film Award Best Actor - Male	Mahesh Babu	Won	
Vamsee Film Awards 2007	Best Actor – Male	Mahesh Babu	Won	

== Remakes ==
Pokiri has been remade in various languages across India. It was first remade into Tamil as Pokkiri in 2007 by Prabhu Deva, and marked his debut as a director in Tamil cinema. Deva remade the film into Hindi as Wanted in 2009. Wanted became the second highest-grossing Hindi film of all time. Pokiri was remade into Kannada as Porki in 2010 by M. D. Sridhar.

== Legacy ==
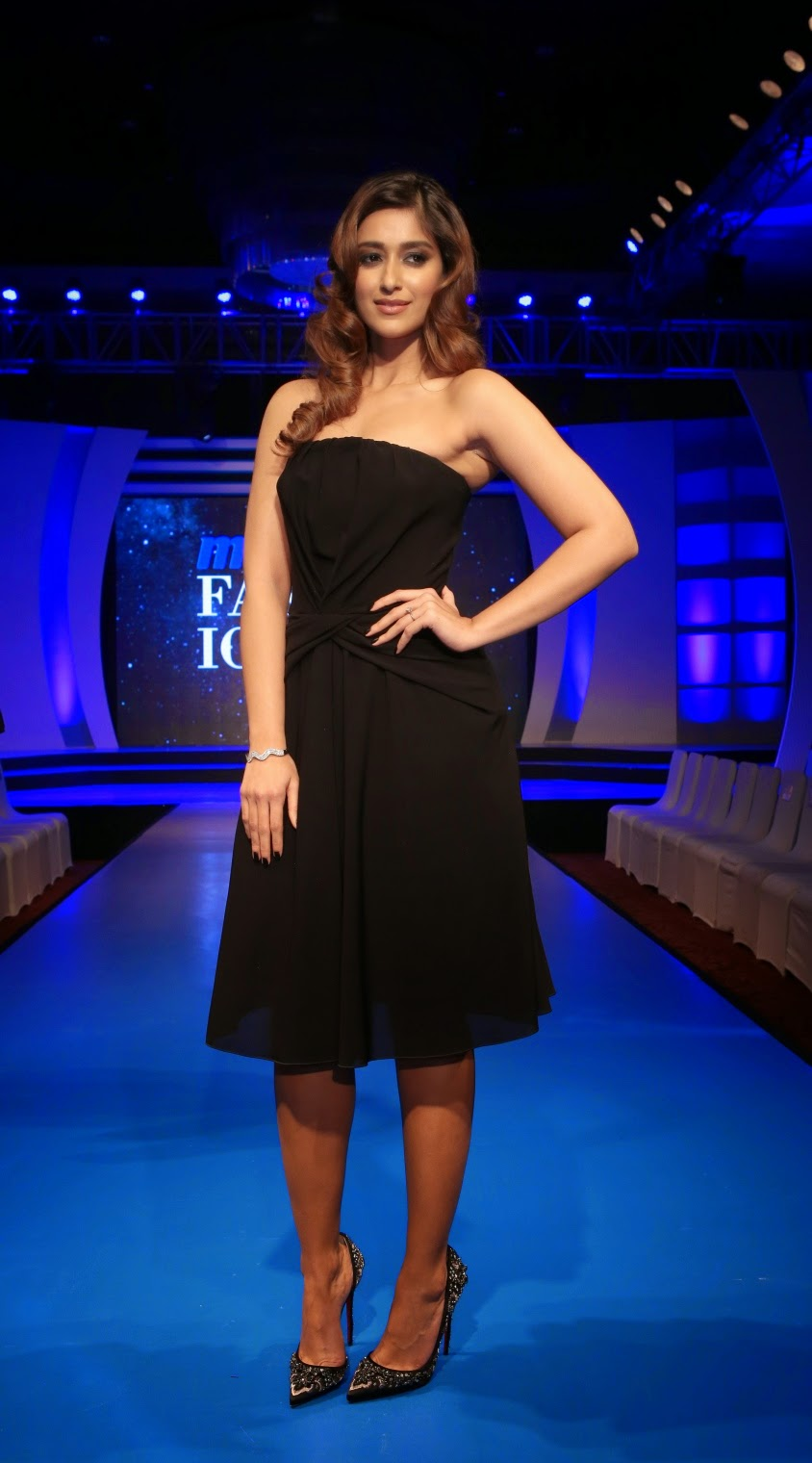
Ileana (pictured) received her breakthrough with this film's success which catapulted her to superstardom.

Pokiri's success elevated Babu to super-stardom and brought recognition to Jagannadh as a writer and director. The sequences featuring Brahmanandam as a software engineer, the comedy track of Ali and Brahmanandam, Babu asking Ileana to give him upma at the railway station were acclaimed. The fashion trend of wearing doctor sleeves increased in Andhra Pradesh after Babu sported them, and they continue to influence fashion even today. After the film's release, many films were released subsequently that had titles bordering on cuss words including Jagannadh's next film Desamuduru (2007). Babu revealed that he became confused after the film's success:

It was such a huge hit, that if someone came to me with a script, I would approach the result of the film before approaching the character. I only wanted to act in movies that were like Pokiri, I think that was a mistake. It all got to me, and I felt that I needed a break from films itself. Initially, I wanted just a seven-month break. I signed Khaleja after nine months, but it just kept getting delayed, and the break ended up becoming a two-year-long holiday. But I didn't freak out... I relaxed for the first time in life.

Two dialogues spoken by Babu in Pokiri became popular: "Evvadu kodute dimma tirigi mind block ayipotundo, vaade Pandugaadu" (transl. If someone hits you so hard your head spins and your brain stops working, that’s Pandu) and "Okkasari commit ayite naa mata neene vinanu" (transl. Once I commit, I don't even listen to myself). The film was Ileana's breakthrough in Telugu. In June 2006, Trade analyst Sridhar Pillai said that the Andhra Pradesh trade felt that her glamour, screen presence, and on-screen chemistry with Babu worked to the film's advantage. Pillai called her the "new pin-up girl of Telugu cinema". Talking about being typecast after her success in Ye Maaya Chesave (2010) as its female lead, Samantha Ruth Prabhu cited the example of Ileana being typecast in similar roles after the success of Pokiri saying that it had become mandatory for her to wear a bikini in every film since.

Pokiri was parodied by several films. In Desamuduru, the character Gudumba Shankar, a saint played by Ali, is seen imitating Babu's mannerism from the song "Dole Dole". Brahmanandam's introduction scene in the film Jalsa (2008) is a spoof of Babu's introduction as a police officer in Pokiri. The same sequence was spoofed in the films Sudigadu (2012) where the protagonist is named Siva Manohar I. P. S., and also in Race Gurram (2014). In Dookudu (2011), Babu is briefly seen as a film director who makes Prudhvi Raj and M. S. Narayana recite the dialogue "Evvadu Kodutge Dimma Tirigi Mind Blockaipothundo, Vaade Pandugaadu" from Pokiri. The protagonist in Eega (2012), a fly, imitates Babu's mannerisms from the song "Jagadame" after injuring the antagonist played by Sudeep. Sayaji Shinde's dialogue in the film, "Tinnama Padukunnama Tellarinda", inspired a film of the same name. In Thank You (2022), Naga Chaitanya is briefly seen as a fan of Babu organizing and enjoying the film in Vishakapatnam.
