= Missamma (2003 film) =

- Film poster
- Directed by: Neelakanta
- Written by: Neelakanta
- Produced by: Satyanarayana B
- Starring: Bhumika; Sivaji; Laya
- Cinematography: Jawahar Reddy
- Edited by: Nagireddy
- Music by: Vandemataram Srinivas
- Production company: Satyam Entertainment
- Release date: 28 November 2003
- Country: India
- Language: Telugu

Missamma (transl. Miss madam) is a 2003 Indian Telugu-language film written and directed by Neelakanta. The film stars Bhumika, Sivaji, and Laya. The film won four Nandi Awards including the Best Feature Film. It was remade in Kannada as Namaste Madam (2014).

A Tamil remake was planned with Cheran and Asin. It was remade in Kannada as Namaste Madam in 2014.

== Plot ==
Nanda Gopal, an efficient professional, works for a business corporation; to gain a promotion, he tries to impress his boss, Meghana, but ends up losing his job; Meghana promises Nanda Gopal that she will retain him if he passes few tests.

== Cast ==
- Bhumika as Meghana (Voice dubbed by Savitha Reddy)
- Sivaji as Nanda Gopal
- Laya as Ratnamala
- Sarath Babu as Meghana's uncle
- Tanikella Bharani as Nanda Gopal's neighbor
- L. B. Sriram as Ratnamala's father
- M. S. Narayana as Office manager
- Raghu Babu as Police Inspector
- Bangalore Padma as Nanda Gopal's neighbor
- Rikki
- Anshu as Deepika (in a guest appearance)

== Music ==
The music director for the film is Vandemataram Srinivas. The audio launch was held at Ramanaidu Studios, Hyderabad on 6th November 2003 with L. V. Prasad's son, Ramesh Prasad, as the chief guest.

Track list
No.	Title	Singer(s)	Length
1.	"Nuvvala Jilibili Guvvala"	Udit Narayan, Usha	3:43
2.	"Ney Padithey Lokamey Padadha"	Vasundhara Das	4:23
3.	"Aakasaniki Aasala Nichena"	Ramdas	3:06
4.	"Entha Sukhamidho"	Shankar Mahadevan, Shreya Ghoshal	4:33
5.	"Andala Gummaro Aa Bapu Bommaro"	Karthik, Nishma	3:53
6.	"Missamma Tune"	S P Balasubramaniam	4:13
7.	"Missamma 2"		4:08
8.	"Theme Music"		1:57
Total length:			28.36

== Reception ==
Jeevi of Idlebrain.com rated the film 3.5/5 and wrote, "The entire film is entertaining. Story, screenplay, direction and dialogues are very good. The casting (Bhumika, Sivaji and Laya) of the film is perfect".

== Awards ==
Nandi Awards

- Best Feature Film - Gold – B Satyanarayana
- Best Actress – Bhumika
- Best Screenplay Writer – Neelakanta
- Best Female Dubbing Artist – Savitha Reddy (for Bhumika)
