= Amyra Dastur =

Indian actress (born 1993)

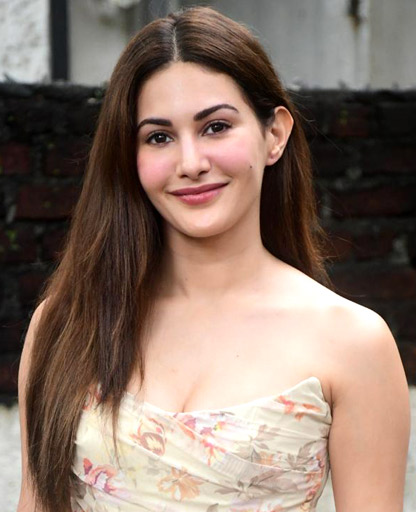
- Dastur in 2025
- Born: 7 May 1993 (age 33); Mumbai, Maharashtra, India
- Education: HR College, Mumbai
- Occupations: Actress; model
- Years active: 2013–present

Amyra Dastur (/əˈmaɪrə dəsˈtʊər/; born 7 May 1993) is an Indian actress who primarily works in Hindi films. Dastur made her debut with the Hindi film Issaq (2013) and had her breakthrough with the Tamil film Anegan (2015). Following this, she appeared in films such as Mr. X (2015), Kaalakaandi (2018), Prassthanam (2019), Jogi (2022) and Bagheera (2023). Dastur also received praises for the streaming series Bambai Meri Jaan (2023) and Chumbak (2026).

== Early life ==
Dastur was born on 7 May 1993, in Mumbai, Maharashtra, to a Zoroastrian Parsi family. Her mother tongue is Gujarati and she also speaks Hindi and English. She described herself as shy and introverted. She holds a bachelor's degree in commerce from Mumbai's HR College.

== Career ==
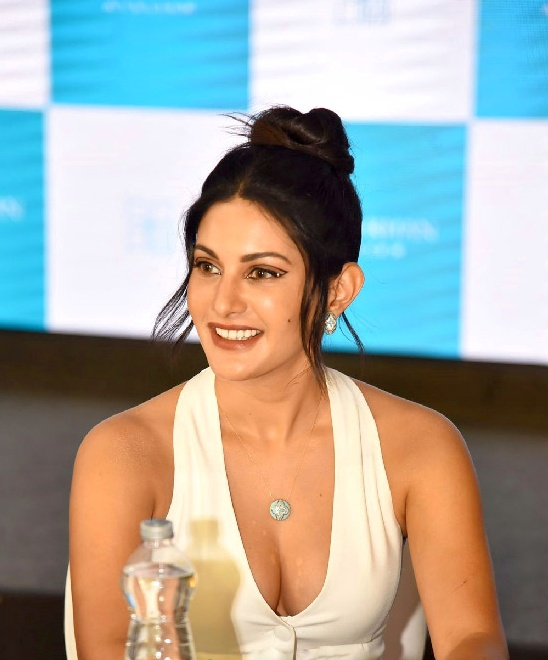
Dastur at an event in 2022

Dastur made her acting debut in 2013 with Issaq opposite Prateik Babbar. The film earned her Zee Cine Award for Best Female Debut nomination, though it failed commercially.

Dastur's achieved recognition with her Tamil debut Anegan, released in 2015. Set in four different time periods, the film is based on the theme of reincarnation, it saw her play four characters opposite Dhanush. M. Suganth of The Times of India noted, "Amyra, in her Tamil film debut, gets a meaty role, and while, as Samudra and Kalyani, she's just another pretty girl falling for charming men below her social stature, as the perplexed Madhu, she is quite convincing." Her performance earned her nomination for SIIMA Award for Best Female Debut – Tamil.

In 2017, Dastur appeared in her first international project, Kung Fu Yoga, acting alongside Jackie Chan. It released in India on 3 February 2017. The film became Jackie Chan's highest-grossing film in China. In 2018, she appeared in three films: Dastur first appeared in Kaalakaandi alongside Saif Ali Khan. She furth made her Telugu debut with Mahesh Babu's sister's first directorial venture, Manasuku Nachindi, and then appeared in Raju Gadu opposite Raj Tarun.

Expanding to streaming series, Dastur played a character based on Sujata Kaur opposite Avinash Tiwary in the 2023 series Bambai Meri Jaan. In 2026, Dastur played a Parsi woman opposite Anant Joshi in the series Chumbak. The series received positive response from critics and audience alike.

== Incident ==
In February 2016, while filming the Hindi movie Ticket to Bollywood, Dastur was involved in an on-set accident that resulted in serious injury to co-actor Diganth. The scene required Dastur to throw items during a scripted argument, originally involving clothes. However, she reportedly threw a stiletto instead, which hit Diganth in the eye. The impact caused significant damage, requiring him to undergo eye surgery in London and a subsequent operation in Scotland to repair his retina and lens. He was advised several months of rest following the procedures. Following the incident, the film was shelved and did not see a commercial release.

== Filmography ==
Key
†	Denotes films that have not yet been released

=== Films ===
Year	Title	Role	Language	Notes	Ref.
2013	Issaq	Bachchi Kashyap	Hindi		
2015	Anegan	Madhumitha, Samudhra, Shenbagavalli and Kalyani (Note: Dastur played quadruple roles in the film.)	Tamil	Quadruple roles	
2015	Mr. X	Siya Verma	Hindi		
2017	Kung Fu Yoga	Kyra	Mandarin	Trilingual film	
2017	Kung Fu Yoga	Kyra	Hindi	Trilingual film	
2017	Kung Fu Yoga	Kyra	English	Trilingual film	
2018	Manasuku Nachindi	Nithya "Nitu"	Telugu		
2018	Kaalakaandi	Neha	Hindi		
2018	Raju Gadu	Tanvi	Telugu		
2018	Rajma Chawal	Tara "Seher" Chaudhary	Hindi		
2019	Judgementall Hai Kya	Reema Agnihotri Kumar	Hindi		
2019	Prassthanam	Shivi	Hindi		
2019	Made in China	Rupali "Rupa" Bansal	Hindi		
2021	Koi Jaane Na	Suhana	Hindi		
2022	Jogi	Kammo	Hindi		
2023	Influencer Life	Kareena	Hindi	Short film	
2023	Bagheera	Ramya "Rabbit"	Tamil		
2023	Any How Mitti Pao	Nimmi	Punjabi		
2023	Chidiyan Da Chamba	Candy Dhillon	Punjabi		
2024	Furteela	Noor	Punjabi		
TBA	Operation Tral †	TBA	Malayalam	Post-production	

=== Television ===
- All series are in Hindi unless otherwise noted.

Year	Title	Role	Notes	Ref.
2018	The Trip	Ira	Season 2	
2021	Tandav	Ada Mir		
2023	Bambai Meri Jaan	Pari Patel		
2026	Chumbak	Hutoxi Taraporewala		

=== Music videos ===
Year	Title	Singer(s)	Ref.
2015	Aa Bhi Ja Tu Kahin Se	Sonu Nigam	
2022	Kaali Car	Asees Kaur, Raftaar	
2023	Kya Loge Tum	B Praak	

== Awards and nominations ==
Year	Award	Category	Work	Result	Ref.
2014	Zee Cine Awards	Best Female Debut	Issaq	Nominated	
2016	South Indian International Movie Awards	Best Female Debut – Tamil	Anegan	Nominated	
