= Manjula Ghattamaneni =

Indian actress

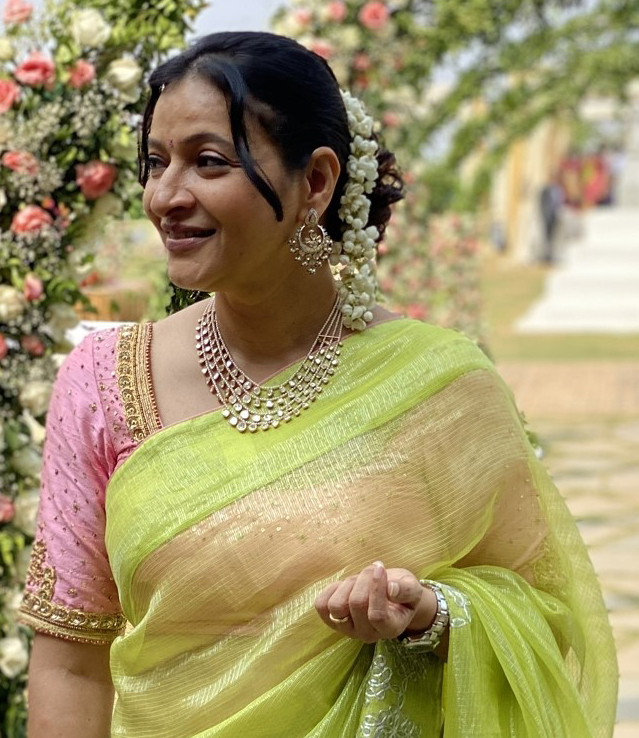
- Manjula Ghattamaneni in 2021
- Born: 8 November 1970 (age 55); Madras, Tamil Nadu, India
- Other names: Manjula, Manjula Swarup
- Occupations: Actor, producer, director
- Years active: 1998–present
- Spouse: Sanjay Swaroop
- Children: 1
- Father: Krishna
- Relatives: Ramesh Babu (brother); Mahesh Babu (brother); Naresh (step-brother); Sudheer Babu (brother-in-law)
- Website: manjulaghattamaneni.com

Manjula Swarup (née Ghattamaneni; born 8 November 1970) is an Indian film producer, director and actress known for her work in Telugu Cinema. Born to prominent Telugu actor Krishna, she began her acting career by doing a cameo role in the 1999 film Rajasthan and went on to act as a supporting actor in the Malayalam film Summer in Bethlehem. She found fame by starring in and producing the 2002 film Show. The film won the National Film Award for Best Feature Film in Telugu and National Film Award for Best Screenplay for that year. She owns a film production company called Indira Productions, named after her mother.

== Personal life ==
She is the second daughter and third child of veteran actor Krishna and his first wife Indira Devi. She has two brothers and two sisters. Her elder brother Ramesh Babu was also a film producer and her younger brother Mahesh Babu is a popular Telugu actor.

Manjula is married to producer and actor Sanjay Swarup. They have a daughter named Jaanvi. She is known to be good friends with her sister-in-law Namrata Shirodkar, who is a former film actress and beauty queen.

Manjula has been pursuing meditation for 20 years.

== Career ==
When Manjula wanted to enter the acting profession, she faced an unfavorable response from her father's fans as they did not want her "... romancing and running around trees with other heroes". Manjula was initially set to make her acting debut in a film co-starring actor M. N. Nambiar's grandson Deepak, but the film did not progress. She began her career by doing a cameo as a terrorist in R. K. Selvamani's Rajasthan. She acted as one of the female leads in the 1998 Malayalam film Summer in Bethlehem, starring Suresh Gopi and Jayaram.

In 2002, she produced and starred in the film Show. Directed by Neelakanta, the film won the National Film Award for Best Feature Film in Telugu.

Her second production venture was Naani (2004), directed by S. J. Suryah. The movie starred her brother, actor Mahesh Babu. The movie failed to do well at the box office. In 2006, she co-produced her third movie Pokiri, an action blockbuster with Puri Jagannadh. The movie was a blockbuster hit and was the highest-grossing movie in the Telugu film industry of the time.

In 2009, she returned to acting with her next production venture Kavya's Diary. In 2010, she along with her husband produced Ye Maaya Chesave, a romantic love story with Naga Chaitanya under Gautham Vasudev Menon's direction. The movie got critical acclaim and was declared a hit at the box office. The same year, she also appeared in the movie Orange, alongside her husband Sanjay Swaroop.

In 2018, she directed her first film Manasuku Nachindi. In 2020, she launched her personal website (manjulaghattamaneni.com) and YouTube channel.

== Awards ==
National Film Awards

- 2003 - National Film Award for Best Feature Film in Telugu (Producer) - Show

Nandi Awards

- 2006 - Nandi Award for Best Popular Feature Film - (co-producer) - Pokiri
- 2001 - Nandi Special Jury Award - (Producer) - Show

== Filmography ==
- Note: all films are in Telugu, unless otherwise noted.

=== As director ===
Year	Film
2018	Manasuku Nachindi

=== As producer ===
Year	Film	Notes
1990	Balachandrudu	
1990	Anna Thammudu	
2002	Show	National Film Award for Best Feature Film in Telugu
2004	Naani	
2006	Pokiri	Nandi Award for Best Popular Feature Film
2009	Kavya's Diary	
2010	Ye Maaya Chesave	

=== As actor ===
Year	Film	Role	Notes
1998	Summer in Bethlehem	Aparna	Malayalam film
1999	Rajasthan	Terrorist Shabana	Tamil film Partially reshot in Telugu
2002	Show	Ridhima	
2009	Kavya's Diary	Pooja	
2010	Orange	Ram's sister	
2013	Sevakudu	Manjula	
2022	Malli Modalaindi	Therapist	
2022	Hunt	Dr. Alekhya	
2023	Month of Madhu	Sarmishta Devi	

=== Television ===
Key
†	Denotes films that have not yet been released

Year	Series	Role	Role	Notes
TBA	Nasha †	TBA	Producer	Filming
