= Neelakanta (director) =

Indian film director and screenwriter

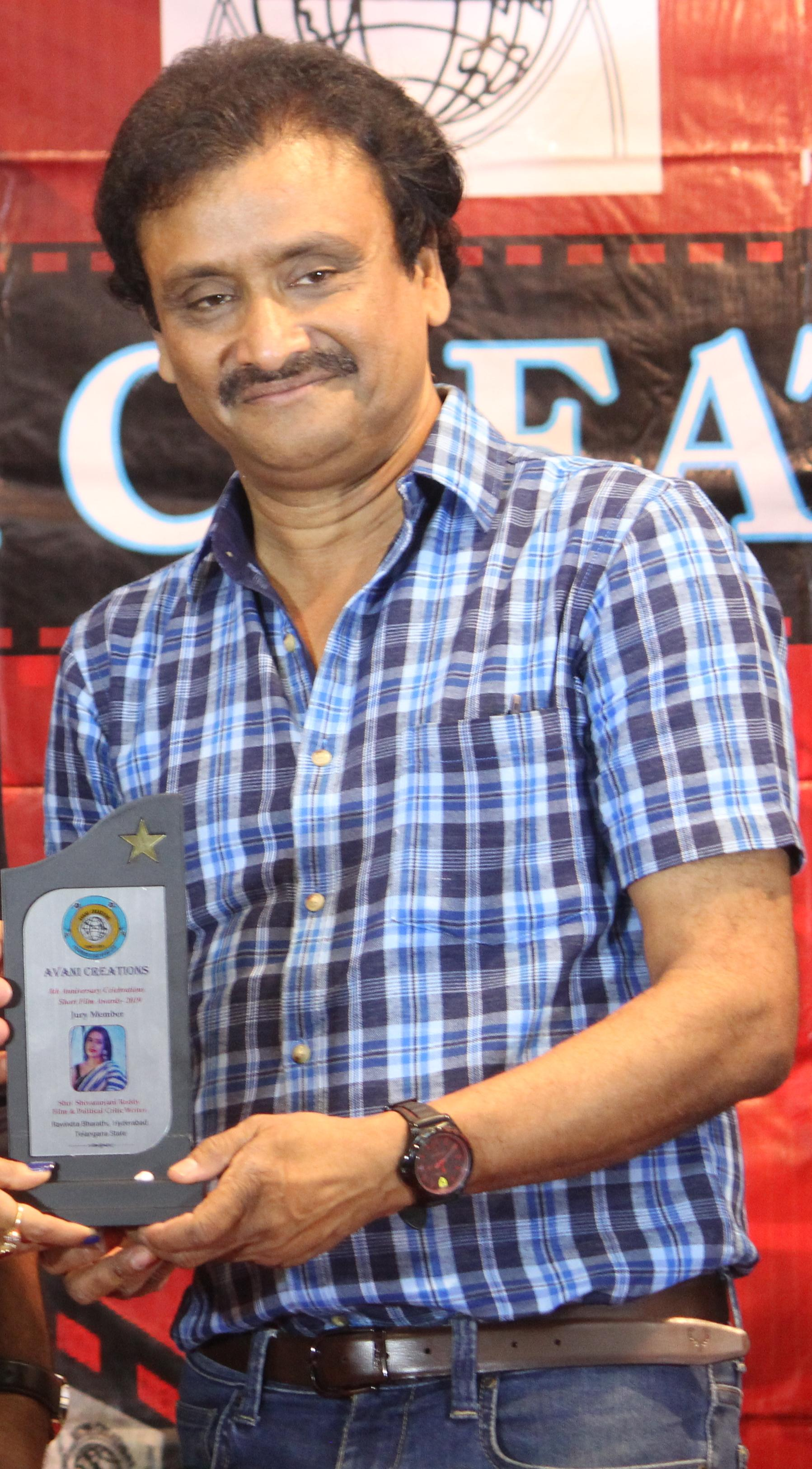
- Neelakanta in 2018
- Born: G. Neelakanta Reddy; Kadapa, Andhra Pradesh, India
- Education: Loyola College, Vijayawada
- Occupations: Director, screenwriter, producer
- Years active: 1988–present

Neelakanta is an Indian film director and screenwriter who works predominantly in Telugu films director. He has received the National Award in the screenwriting for the feature Show. He won two National Film Awards and three Nandi Awards.

== Personal life ==
Neelakanta is a native of Kadapa, Andhra Pradesh. He studied at Loyola Public School and Loyola College in Vijayawada. Since his school days, Neelakanta has had a deep love for film direction and film making which is what drove him to Chennai after his graduation.

== Career ==
Neelakanta worked as an assistant to Vallabhaneni Janardhan for Thodu Needa (1983) and Amayaka Chakravarthy (1983), both of which were remakes and flops. He made his debut as a producer for Jamadagni (1988) since he was a fan of Bharathiraja. He then worked on Priyanka (1994), the Tamil remake of Damini (1993). He then took a hiatus as all of the offers that he was receiving were for remakes and he wanted to make something original. He always wanted to make films which eloquently depicted the psychological study of characters for the off-beat his passion materialised with Show followed by Missamma. He received two national awards, one for Best Screenplay and the other for the Best Feature Film in Telugu for Show while state Nandi Award in the screenplay department for the latter.

He then made Sada Mee Sevalo, with Shriya Saran and Venu Thottempudi in lead roles, and later made a psychological thriller, Nandanavanam 120km. Both these films did not do well at the box office. Despite its commercial failure, Nanadanavanam got him huge critical acclaim. These were followed by Mr.Medhavi. with Genelia and Raja in the lead roles. This film, produced by RamaRao Bodduluri, proved to be an above-average grosser. He also wrote dialogues for a Telugu remake of the Hindi hit A Wednesday!, entitled Eeenadu. In 2011, Neelakanta directed Virodhi, featuring Meka Srikanth and Kamalinee Mukherjee. Neelakanta secured the best dialogue writer award in the year 2011 for this film. In 2013 he directed Chammak Challo, which gathered bad reviews for both the director and the film.

In 2018, he directed the Malayalam film Zam Zam starring Manjima Mohan. The film is an official remake of the Hindi film Queen.

== Filmography ==
- Note: All films are in Telugu, unless otherwise noted.

Year	Film	Director	Writer	Producer	Notes
1988	Jamadagni	No	No	Yes	
1994	Priyanka	Yes	Screenplay	Yes	Tamil film
2002	Show	Yes	Yes	No	Winner - two National Film Awards
2003	Missamma	Yes	Yes	No	Winner - Nandi Award for Best Screenplay Writer
2005	Sadaa Mee Sevalo	Yes	Yes	No	
2006	Nandanavanam 120km	Yes	Yes	Yes	
2008	Mr. Medhavi	Yes	Yes	No	
2009	Eenadu	No	Dialogues	No	
2011	Virodhi	Yes	Yes	No	Screened at International Film Festival of India – 2011; Winner - Two Nandi Awards 2011; Screened at Melbourne International Film Festival-2011
2013	Chammak Challo	Yes	Yes	No	
2014	Maaya	Yes	Yes	No	
2023	Circle	Yes	Yes	No	
TBA	Zam Zam	Yes	Yes	No	Malayalam film

== Awards ==
National Film Awards

- National Film Award for Best Feature Film in Telugu – 2002 – Show
- National Film Award for Best Screenplay – 2002 – Show

Nandi Awards

- Nandi Award for Best Screenplay Writer – Show (2001)
- Nandi Award for Best Screenplay Writer – Missamma (2003)
- Nandi Award for Best Dialogue Writer – Virodhi (2011)
