= 70th National Film Awards =

Award ceremony for Indian films of 2022

- Awarded for: Best of Indian cinema in 2022
- Awarded by: Ministry of Information and Broadcasting
- Presented by: President of India
- Announced on: 16 August 2024
- Presented on: 8 October 2024
- Site: New Delhi
- Official website: nfaindia.org/en

Highlights
- Best Feature Film: Aattam
- Best Non-Feature Film: Ayena
- Best Book: Kishore Kumar: The Ultimate Biography
- Best Film Critic: Deepak Dua
- Dadasaheb Phalke Award: Mithun Chakraborty
- Most awards: Ponniyin Selvan: I (4)

The 70th National Film Awards were announced on 16 August 2024 to honour the best films of 2022 in Indian cinema, presented by the National Film Development Corporation of India. The awards ceremony was originally slated to be held on 3 May 2023 but was postponed to October 2024 due to delays after the COVID-19 pandemic. The winners were announced on 16 August 2024, by the Ministry of Information and Broadcasting in a press conference. The winners along with the Dadasaheb Phalke Award recipient were felicitated by the President, Droupadi Murmu on 8 October 2024 at the Vigyan Bhawan, New Delhi.

== Selection process ==
The National Film Development Corporation of India invited online entries with the acceptable last date for entries until 30 January 2024. Feature and Non-Feature Films certified by Central Board of Film Certification between 1 January 2022, and 31 December 2022, were eligible for the film award categories. Books, critical studies, reviews or articles on cinema published in Indian newspapers, magazines, and journals between 1 January 2022, and 31 December 2022, were eligible for the best writing on cinema section. Entries of dubbed, revised or copied versions of a film or translation, abridgements, edited or annotated works and reprints were ineligible for the awards.

For the feature and non-feature Films sections, films in any Indian language, shot on 16 mm, 35 mm, a wider film gauge or a digital format, and released in cinemas, on video or digital formats for home viewing were eligible. Films were required to be certified as a feature film, documentary, short film, or animation film etc by the Central Board of Film Certification.

== Feature Film ==
=== Jury ===
• Rahul Rawail (chairman)
• Subhrajit Mitra	•
•	•
•	•

=== Golden Lotus Awards ===
Official Name: Swarna Kamal

All the awardees are awarded with 'Golden Lotus Award (Swarna Kamal)', a certificate and cash prize.

Award	Film	Language	Awardee(s)	Cash prize
Best Feature Film	Aattam	Malayalam	Producer: Joy Movie Productions; Director: Anand Ekarshi	₹3,00,000 each
Best Debut Film of a Director	Fouja	Haryanvi	Director: Pramod Kumar	₹3,00,000
Best Popular Film Providing Wholesome Entertainment	Kantara	Kannada	Producer: Hombale Films; Director: Rishab Shetty	₹3,00,000 each
Best Film in AVGC (Note: Animator and Producer & Director comes under Golden Lotus (Swarna Kamal) section for animation, and the VFX Supervisor comes under the Silver Lotus (Rajat Kamal) section for visual effects) • Producer & Director	Brahmāstra: Part One – Shiva	Hindi	Producer: Dharma Productions, Prime Focus and Starlight Pictures; Director: Ayan Mukerji	₹3,00,000 each
Best Direction	Uunchai	Hindi	Sooraj R. Barjatya	₹3,00,000

=== Silver Lotus Award ===
Official Name: Rajat Kamal

All the awardees are awarded with 'Silver Lotus Award (Rajat Kamal)', a certificate and cash prize.

Award	Film	Language	Awardee(s)	Cash prize
Best Film in AVGC • VFX Supervisor	Brahmāstra: Part One – Shiva	Hindi	Jaykar Arudra, Viral Thakkar and Neelesh Gore	₹2,00,000 shared
Best Feature Film Promoting National, Social and Environmental Values	Kutch Express	Gujarati	Producer: Soul Sutra LLP; Director: Viral Shah	₹2,00,000 each
Best Actor in a Leading Role	Kantara	Kannada	Rishab Shetty	₹2,00,000
Best Actress in a Leading Role	Thiruchitrambalam	Tamil	Nithya Menen	₹2,00,000 shared
Best Actress in a Leading Role	Kutch Express	Gujarati	Manasi Parekh	₹2,00,000 shared
Best Actor in a Supporting Role	Fouja	Haryanvi	Pavan Malhotra	₹2,00,000
Best Actress in a Supporting Role	Uunchai	Hindi	Neena Gupta	₹2,00,000
Best Child Artist	Malikappuram	Malayalam	Sreepath	₹2,00,000
Best Male Playback Singer	Brahmāstra: Part One – Shiva (Song: "Kesariya")	Hindi	Arijit Singh	₹2,00,000
Best Female Playback Singer	Saudi Vellakka (Song: "Chaayum Veyil")	Malayalam	Bombay Jayashri	₹2,00,000
Best Cinematography	Ponniyin Selvan: I	Tamil	Ravi Varman	₹2,00,000
Best Screenplay • Screenplay Writer (Original)	Aattam	Malayalam	Anand Ekarshi	₹2,00,000
Best Screenplay • Dialogues	Gulmohar	Hindi	Arpita Mukherjee and Rahul V. Chittella	₹2,00,000 shared
Best Sound Design	Ponniyin Selvan: I	Tamil	Anand Krishnamoorthi	₹2,00,000
Best Editing	Aattam	Malayalam	Mahesh Bhuvanend	₹2,00,000
Best Production Design	Aparajito	Bengali	Ananda Addhya	₹2,00,000
Best Costume Design	Kutch Express	Gujarati	Niki Joshi	₹2,00,000
Best Make-up	Aparajito	Bengali	Somnath Kundu	₹2,00,000
Best Music Direction • Songs	Brahmāstra: Part One – Shiva	Hindi	Pritam	₹2,00,000
Best Music Direction • Background Music	Ponniyin Selvan: I	Tamil	A. R. Rahman	₹2,00,000
Best Lyrics	Fouja (Song: "Salaami")	Haryanvi	Naushad Sadar Khan	₹2,00,000
Best Choreography	Thiruchitrambalam (Song: "Megham Karukkatha")	Tamil	Jani Master (Note: The award committee has suspended the National Award and has withdrawn the invitation to attend the award ceremony, due to the allegations of crime against him under the POCSO act.) and Sathish Krishnan	₹2,00,000 shared
Best Action Direction	KGF: Chapter 2	Kannada	Anbariv	₹2,00,000

=== Regional awards ===
All the awardees are awarded with Silver Lotus Award (Rajat Kamal), a certificate and cash prize.

Best Feature Film in Each of the Language Specified in the Schedule VIII of the Constitution
Award	Film	Awardee(s)		Cash prize
Award	Film	Producer	Director	Cash prize
Best Assamese Feature Film	Emuthi Puthi	Metanormal Motion Pictures	Kulanandini Mahanta	₹2,00,000 each
Best Bengali Feature Film	Kaberi Antardhan	Surinder Films	Kaushik Ganguly	₹2,00,000 each
Best Hindi Feature Film	Gulmohar	Star India	Rahul V. Chittella	₹2,00,000 each
Best Kannada Feature Film	KGF: Chapter 2	Hombale Films	Prashanth Neel	₹2,00,000 each
Best Malayalam Feature Film	Saudi Vellakka	Urvasi Theatres	Tharun Moorthy	₹2,00,000 each
Best Marathi Feature Film	Vaalvi	Mayasabha Karamanuk Mandali and Zee	Paresh Mokashi	₹2,00,000 each
Best Odia Feature Film	Daman	JP Motion Pictures	Vishal Mourya and Debi Prasad Lenka	₹2,00,000 each
Best Punjabi Feature Film	Baghi Di Dhee	G-Next Media	Mukesh Gautam	₹2,00,000 each
Best Tamil Feature Film	Ponniyin Selvan: I	Madras Talkies	Mani Ratnam	₹2,00,000 each
Best Telugu Feature Film	Karthikeya 2	Abhishek Agarwal Arts and People Media Factory	Chandoo Mondeti	₹2,00,000 each

Best Feature Film in Each of the Language Other Than Those Specified In the Schedule VIII of the Constitution
Award	Film	Awardee(s)		Cash prize
Award	Film	Producer	Director	Cash prize
Best Tiwa Feature Film	Sikaisal	Imaging Media	Bobby Sarma Baruah	₹2,00,000 each

=== Special Mention ===
All the awardees are awarded with a certificate.

Award	Film	Language	Awardee(s)	Cash prize
Special Mention	Gulmohar	Hindi	Actor: Manoj Bajpayee	Certificate only
Special Mention	Kadhikan	Malayalam	Music Director: Sanjoy Chowdhury	Certificate only

== Non-Feature Film ==
Non-feature length films made in any Indian language and certified by the Central Board of Film Certification as a documentary, short film, animation film etc are eligible for non-feature film section.

=== Jury ===
• Nila Madhab Panda (chairman)
•	•
•	•
•	•

=== Golden Lotus Award ===
Official Name: Swarna Kamal

All the awardees are awarded with 'Golden Lotus Award (Swarna Kamal)', a certificate and cash prize.

Award	Film	Language	Awardee(s)	Cash prize
Best Non-Feature Film	Ayena	Hindi; Urdu	Producer: Teh Films; Director: Siddhant Sarin	₹3,00,000 each
Best Direction	From the Shadows	English; Bengali; Hindi	Miriam Chandy Menacherry	₹3,00,000
Best Debut Film of a Director	Madhyantara	Kannada	Basti Dinesh Shenoy	₹3,00,000

=== Silver Lotus Award ===
Official Name: Rajat Kamal

All the awardees are awarded with Silver Lotus Award (Rajat Kamal) and cash prize.

Award	Film	Language	Awardee(s)	Cash prize
Best Biographical / Historical Reconstruction / Compilation Film	Aankhi Ek Mohenjo Daro	Marathi	Producer: de Goan Studio; Ashok Rane Productions; Director: Ashok Rane	₹2,00,000 each
Best Arts / Cultural Film	Ranga Vibhoga	Kannada	Producer and Director: Suneel Narasimhachar Puranik	₹2,00,000 shared
Best Arts / Cultural Film	Varsa	Marathi	Producer and Director: Sachin Balasaheb Suryawanshi	₹2,00,000 shared
Best Documentary	Murmurs of the Jungle	Marathi	Producer and Director: Sohil Vaidya	₹2,00,000
Best Non Feature Film Promoting Social And Environmental Values	On the Brink – Season 2 – Gharial	English	Producer: The Gaia People; Director: Akanksha Sood Singh	₹2,00,000 each
Best Animation Film	A Coconut Tree	English	Producer: JB Productions; Director and Animator: Joshy Benedict	₹2,00,000 each
Best Short Film	Xunyota	Assamese	Producer: HM Production; Director: Nabapan Deka	₹2,00,000 each
Best Cinematography	Mono No Aware	Hindi; English	Siddharth Diwan	₹2,00,000
Best Sound Design	Yaan	Hindi; Malwi	Manas Choudhury	₹2,00,000
Best Editing	Madhyantara	Kannada	Suresh Urs	₹2,00,000
Best Music Direction	Fursat	Hindi	Vishal Bhardwaj	₹2,00,000
Best Narration / Voice Over	Murmurs of the Jungle	Marathi	Sumant Shinde	₹2,00,000
Best Script	Mono No Aware	Hindi; English	Koushik Sarkar	₹2,00,000

=== Special Mention ===
All the awardees are awarded with a certificate.

Award	Film	Language	Awardee(s)	Cash prize
Special Mention	Birubala: Witch to Padmashri	Assamese	Producer: Aimee Baruah Production Society; Director: Aimee Baruah	Certificate only
Special Mention	Hargila – The Greater Adjutant Stork	Assamese	Producer: PI Entertainment; Director: Partha Sarathi Mahanta	Certificate only

== Best Writing on Cinema ==
The awards aim at encouraging study and appreciation of cinema as an art form and dissemination of information and critical appreciation of this art-form through publication of books, articles, reviews etc.

=== Jury ===
• Gangadhar Mudaliar (Chairman)
•	•

=== Golden Lotus Award ===
Official Name: Swarna Kamal

All the awardees are awarded with the Golden Lotus Award (Swarna Kamal) accompanied with a cash prize.

Award	Book	Language	Awardee(s)	Cash prize
Best Book on Cinema	Kishore Kumar: The Ultimate Biography	English	Publisher: HarperCollins Publishers India; Author: Anirudha Bhattacharjee; Parthiv Dhar	₹1,00,000 each
Best Film Critic	—N/a	Hindi	Deepak Dua	₹1,00,000
