= Nandish Sandhu =

Indian actor, model and producer

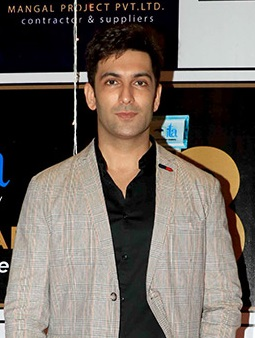
- Nandish at the ITA Awards in 2018
- Born: Nandish Singh Sandhu; 25 December 1981 (age 44); Dholpur, Rajasthan, India
- Occupation: Actor
- Years active: 2007–present
- Known for: Uttaran; Super 30
- Spouses: Rashami Desai (m. 2012; div. 2016) Kavita Banerjee (m. 2026)

Nandish Singh Sandhu (born 25 December 1981) is an Indian actor, working in Hindi cinema and television. He is best known for starring in the notable soap opera Uttaran (2009–2012) as the lead, Veer Singh Bundela. Sandhu's other TV works include Phir Subah Hogi (2012), Beintehaa (2013), Grahan (2021) and Jubilee (2023). He made his Hindi film debut with a supporting role in Super 30 (2019).

== Personal life ==
He married her co-star from Uttaran, Rashami Desai, on 12 February 2011 in Ghaziabad. In 2014, they separated, and in 2015, the couple filed for divorce after almost four years of marriage. It was finalised in March 2016.

In October 2025, he engaged his girlfriend, Kavita Banerjee. and the couple married on 14 November 2026 with traditional Bengali.

== Career ==
Sandhu started his career with modelling. In 2007, he made his acting debut in the television show with Star Plus's Kasturi, where he played Raunak. and afterwards he appeared in several TV shows, where he played supporting role and cameo role.

In 2009, His first major breakthrough and official debut occurred in TV with the role of Veer Singh Bundela opposite Tina Dutta in Colors TV's Uttaran. It was his portrayal of Veer which garnered him household name and fame, earned widespread recognition and popularity, including several awards and nominations. Uttaran opened up newer international markets for Indian Television, The ratings of the show increased after his entry and his chemistry with Tina Datta was also highly applauded. He quit the show in 2012, when the show took 18 years leap.

In 2012, Sandhu featured in Zee TV's Phir Subah Hogi. In 2014, Sandhu played Lawyer Rehaan in Colors TV's Beintehaa. In 2015, he participated in Colors TV's stunt-action show Fear Factor: Khatron Ke Khiladi 6 which was hosted by director Rohit Shetty and reached the semifinals. In the same year, he participated (along with his then-wife Rashami Desai) in the Star Plus's dance reality show Nach Baliye 7 emerging as runner-up.

Sandhu married his Uttaran co-star Rashami Desai on 12 February 2012 in Dholpur. In 2014, they announced their separation and they got divorced in 2015.

He turn producer a short film in 2016 named Girl in Red, he also acted in it. It was directed by Saurabh Verma. Girl in Red is now also available on MX Player, the film holds an average rating of 6.3 out of 10 based on 15 reviews. Girl in red received mixed reviews by critics; Rahul of Film Companion says Saurabh Varma's short about a chain-smoking author battling a writer's block isn't a bad film. But often, this averageness is more disappointing because of what could have been. Then again in 2017, he co-produced another short film named The Gift starring Gul Panag, Kushal Punjabi and Mandira Bedi in lead, it's available on the streaming app Sony LIV since it is released.

In 2019, Sandhu was cast alongside Hrithik Roshan in Bollywood biopic movie Super 30 he played the role of Pranav Kumar, a brother of Anand Kumar. The film was released to commercial success, but received mixed reviews. He also starred in the 2019 movie Family of Thakurganj which was directed by Manoj Jha and written by Dilip Shukla. The film also starred Jimmy Shergill, Mahie Gill and Saurabh Shukla in key roles.

In 2021, Nandish played a supporting role in the Hotstar original series titled Grahan in the role of Kartik. The series starred Pawan Malhotra, Zoya Hussain, Wamiqa Gabbi and Anshumaan Pushkar in lead roles.

== Filmography ==
Key
†	Denotes films that have not yet been released

=== Films ===
Year	Title	Role	Notes
2012	Dabangg 2	Groom	Special appearance in song "Dagabaaz Re"
2016	Girl in Red	Aditya Verma	Short film; also producer
2017	The Gift	—N/a	Short film; producer only
2019	Super 30	Pranav Kumar	
2019	Family of Thakurganj	Munnu	

=== Television ===
Year	Title	Role	Notes
2007	Kasturi	Raunak Singhaniya	
2007	Khwaish	Yasir	
2007	Kayamath	Saket	
2007	Comedy Circus	Contestant	
2007	Ssshhhh...Phir Koi Hai	Rahul	Episode 23
2008	Ssshhhh...Phir Koi Hai	Shiv	Episodes 118 & 119
2008	Hum Ladkiyan	Rahul	
2009–2012	Uttaran	Veer Singh Bundela	
2009	Laughter Ke Phatke	Contestant	
2009	Raaz Pichhle Janam Ka	Contestant	
2010	Entertainment Ke Liye Kuch Bhi Karega	Contestant	
2010	Kitchen Champion 4	Contestant	
2011	Jhalak Dikhhla Jaa 4	Guest Contestant	
2011	Bigg Boss 5	Guest	
2012	Phir Subah Hogi	Thakur Aditya Singh	
2013	Beintehaa	Rehan Habeeb Khan	
2014	Encounter	Inspector Sartaj Quereshi	
2014	Welcome – Baazi Mehmaan Nawazi Ki 2	Contestant	
2014	Box Cricket League 1	Contestant	
2015	Fear Factor: Khatron Ke Khiladi 6	Contestant	
2015	Nach Baliye 7	Contestant	
2015	Darr Sabko Lagta Hai	Rajinder/Raj	Episodic role
2016	Box Cricket League 2	Contestant	
2016	BCL Gujarat	Contestant	
2016	Jhalak Dikhhla Jaa 9	Contestant	Wild card entrant; not selected
2021	Grahan	Kartik	Hotstar series
2022	Undekhi	Samarth	Sony Liv series
2023	Jubilee	Jamshed Khan	Amazon Prime Video series
2026	Taskaree	Ravinder Gujjar	Netflix series

=== Music videos ===
Year	Title	Artist
2015	"Teri Ek Hansee"	Jubin Nautiyal
2020	"Chale Aao"	Rhiti
