= Grahan (2021 TV series) =

2021 Indian streaming Web TV series

- Promotional poster
- Genre: Crime; Drama
- Created by: Shailendra Kumar Jha
- Based on: Chaurasi by Satya Vyas
- Written by: Anu Singh Choudhary; Vibha Singh; Prateek Payodhi; Navjot Gulati; Ranjan Chandel; Shailendra Kumar Jha
- Directed by: Ranjan Chandel
- Starring: Zoya Hussain; Pawan Malhotra; Anshumaan Pushkar; Wamiqa Gabbi
- Composers: Amit Trivedi (songs); Daniel B. George (background score)
- Country of origin: India
- Original language: Hindi
- No. of seasons: 1
- No. of episodes: 8

Production
- Producer: Ajay G. Rai
- Production location: India
- Cinematography: Kamaljeet Negi
- Editor: Shan Mohammed
- Running time: 45-55 min
- Production company: Jar Pictures

Original release
- Network: Hotstar
- Release: 24 June 2021

Grahan is an Indian Hindi crime drama television series created by Shailendra Kumar Jha and directed by Ranjan Chandel for Hotstar based on the book Chaurasi by Satya Vyas. The series stars Pawan Malhotra, Zoya Hussain, Anshumaan Pushkar and Wamiqa Gabbi. The series premiered on Hotstar on June 24, 2021.

== Overview ==
Amrita Singh, a young IPS officer, resigns fed up with political interference at work, opting to marry her longstanding beau in Canada. That's when she learns that her father Gursevak Singh, a Sikh himself, is a prime accused of 1984 anti-Sikh riots in Bokaro, Jharkhand.

Amrita decides to stay on in the police force to unravel the truth. Through Amrita's investigation emerges a tender love story of trust, betrayal and supreme sacrifice, where we see a beautiful old-world romance of Rishi and Manu, a Hindu boy and a Sikh girl in 1984. As the story progresses, secrets from the past about identities and relationships come tumbling out one after another, while at the social-political canvas the situations in 1984 and 2016 present some chilling and uncanny similarities too.

== Cast ==
- Pawan Malhotra as Gurusevak / Rishi Ranjan (older)
  - Anshumaan Pushkar as Rishi Ranjan (younger)
- Zoya Hussain as SP Amrita Singh
- Wamiqa Gabbi as Manjeet Kaur Chhabra / Manu (younger)
  - Donny Kapoor as Manjeet Kaur Chhabra / Manu (older)
- Teekam Joshi as Sanjay Kumar Singh / Chunnu Babu
- Sahidur Rahman as DSP Vikas Mandal
- Abhinav Pateriya as Jaydev Agarwal / Jhandu
- Namrata Varshney as Pragya (younger)
- Shreedhar Dubey as Santosh and Suresh Jaiswal (double role)
- Nandish Sandhu as Kartik
- Sudhanva Deshpande as DIG Ramavtaar Keshari
- Satyakam Anand as CM Kedar Bhagat
- Abhash Makharia as Suraj
- Abhishek Tripathi as SHO Batuk Singh
- Sukhvinder Chahal as Mr. Chhabra, Manu's father
- Aarya Sharma as Mrs. Chhabra, Manu's mother
- Raj Sharma as Saini
- Anil Rastogi as Ramakant Thakur
- Saharsh Kumar Shukla as Guru
- Neelu Dogra as Pushpa Sanjay Singh
- Vijay Shukla as Agarwal
- Anshuman Rawat as Adhikari
- Bulloo Kumar as Kushal
- Sachin Mishra as a danga informant
- Purva Parag as older pragya
- Akhilesh Yadav as rishi rioter
- Rubina as defense lawyer assistant
- Bilaal Ahmed as danga terrace informant

== Production ==
The series marked the debut of Ranjan Chandel as the director, known for working on Mukkabaaz (2018) as co-writer and also made his directorial debut with Bamfaad (2020). It is based on the novel Chaurasi by Satya Vyas, which portrays the romantic relationship between two couples in the backdrop of 1984 anti-Sikh riots. Chandel stated that "I spend most of my time reading literature and poetry from all over the world and as a filmmaker, I want to tell stories of the characters who are rooted in Indian soil, and I connect with the stories where I find high emotional value." The pre-production for the series began in February 2020 but was put on hold due to COVID-19 pandemic lockdown in India in March 2020, which was resumed after the lockdown. The principal photography of the series started in September 2020 at Lucknow, Uttar Pradesh and filming completed on 4 December 2020.

== Soundtrack ==
Grahan

Soundtrack album by Amit Trivedi and Daniel B. George
- Released: 30 June 2021
- Genre: Feature film soundtrack
- Length: 13:04
- Language: Hindi
- Label: Sony Music India

The soundtrack for Grahan features four songs composed by Amit Trivedi and Daniel B. George, with lyrics written by Varun Grover and Swanand Kirkire.

Track listing
No.	Title	Lyrics	Music	Singer(s)	Length
1.	"Chori Chori"	Varun Grover	Amit Trivedi	Abhijeet Srivatsava, Rupali Moghe	03:35
2.	"O Jogiya"	Varun Grover	Amit Trivedi	Asees Kaur, Shahid Mallya	03:32
3.	"Main Hoon Teri Parichayi"	Swanand Kirkire	Daniel B. George	Swanand Kirkire, Madhubanti Bagchi	02:26
4.	"O Jogiya" (Reprise)	Varun Grover	Amit Trivedi	Asees Kaur, Javed Ali	03:30
Total length:					13:04

== Release ==
Grahan was premiered on Disney+ Hotstar globally on June 24, 2021. The first trailer was released on June 10, 2021.

== Reception ==
Archika Khurana writing for The Times of India said, "Overall, 'Grahan' is an emotional tale that will leave you with a bag full of mixed emotions — love, hate, anguish, and betrayal. At times, it overwhelms too" and has rated 3.5 stars out of 5.

Shweta Keshri writing for India Today expressed, "the series might also interest the millennial kids in trying to find out about a forgotten chapter and one of the dark chapters of Indian history, which is not often talked about."

Sana Farzeen writing for The Indian Express said, "An impactful series that finds resonance in today’s India." Saibal Chatterjee writing for NDTV expressed, "Grahan, an essential cautionary tale, isn't eclipsed by its own unerringly earnest devices. Recommended for its humanist core."

=== Accolades ===
Year	Award	Category	Nominee	Result	Ref.
2021	Filmfare OTT Awards	Best Series (Drama)	Grahan	Nominated	
2021	Filmfare OTT Awards	Best Director	Ranjan Chandel	Nominated	
2021	Filmfare OTT Awards	Best Actor (Male)	Anshumaan Pushkar	Nominated	
2021	Filmfare OTT Awards	Best Actor (Female)	Zoya Hussain	Nominated	
2021	Filmfare OTT Awards	Best Adapted Screenplay	Shailendra Kumar Jha	Nominated	
2021	Filmfare OTT Awards	Best Background Score	Daniel B. George	Nominated	
2021	Filmfare OTT Awards	Best Cinematography	Kamaljeet Negi	Nominated	
2021	Filmfare OTT Awards	Best Editor	Shan Mohammed	Nominated	
2021	Filmfare OTT Awards	Best Coustume Design	Maxima Basu, Ajay KMR	Nominated	
2021	Filmfare OTT Awards	Best Production Design	Wasiq Khan	Nominated	
