= Flight (2021 film) =

2021 Indian film directed by Suraj Joshi

- Theatrical release poster
- Directed by: Mohit Chadda (Created By); Suraj Joshi
- Written by: Mohit Chadda
- Produced by: K. Chadda; Rohit Chadda; Ishita Sharma; Babita Ashiwal
- Starring: Mohit Chadda; Pavan Malhotra; Zakir Hussain; Shibani Bedi
- Cinematography: Deepak Pandey
- Edited by: Rahul Mathur
- Music by: Smriti Minocha
- Production company: Crazy Boyz Entertainment Production
- Distributed by: Reliance Entertainment; UFO Moviez; Amazon Prime Video
- Release date: 2 April 2021
- Running time: 116 minutes
- Country: India
- Language: Hindi

Flight is a 2021 Indian Hindi-language aviation thriller film Created by Mohit Chadda directed by Suraj Joshi and produced by Crazy Boyz Entertainment Production. The film stars Mohit Chadda, Pavan Malhotra, Zakir Hussain, Shibani Bedi Ishita Sharma in a guest appearance and others.

It released on 2 April 2021, in theatres in India. and later re-released with a re-edited and re-mastered version in 2025.

== Synopsis ==
The film follows the journey of Ranveer Malhotra who against all odds has to face deadly obstacles on a plane to survive. After a plane manufactured by Ranveer's company crashes leading to the death of many passengers, he decides to investigate the case. Against the wishes of the other shareholders of the company, he tries to uncover the truth but his plane gets hijacked.

== Cast ==
- Mohit Chadda as Ranveer Malhotra
- Pavan Malhotra as Balraj Sahni
- Zakir Hussain as Raman Khanna
- Shibani Bedi as Rukhsana
- Ishita Sharma as Ishita
- Pritam Singh as Capt. Sanjay Sanyal

== Release and reception ==
The film was earlier slated for release on 19 March 2021, but the makers postponed the release to 2 April after Akshay Kumar-starrer Sooryavanshi cancelled its release due to resurgence in cases of COVID-19 in India.

The movie received mixed reviews.
