= Aithe =

Aithe...
- Poster of the Telugu version
- Directed by: Chandra Sekhar Yeleti
- Written by: Chandra Sekhar Yeleti
- Dialogues by: Gangaraju Gunnam
- Produced by: Gangaraju Gunnam; Venkat Dega
- Starring: Pavan Malhotra; Mohit Chadda; Shashank; Abhishek; Janardhan; Sindhu Tolani
- Cinematography: K. K. Senthil Kumar
- Edited by: Sudhakar
- Music by: Kalyani Malik
- Production company: Just Yellow Media
- Release dates: 11 April 2003 (Telugu); 5 October 2007 (Hindi)
- Country: India
- Languages: Telugu; Hindi

Aithe... (transl. If so...) is a 2003 Indian Telugu-language thriller film written and directed by Chandra Sekhar Yeleti in his directorial debut, and produced by Gangaraju Gunnam under his studio Just Yellow. The film's lead cast mostly consists of debutants, including Mohit Chadda, Shashank, Abhishek, Janardhan, and Sindhu Tolani, while Pavan Malhotra plays a pivotal role. The film deals with underworld criminal nexus and hijacking. The film was shot simultaneously in Hindi as 50 Lakh (2007).

Aithe was released on 11 April 2003. The film ran for a hundred days and was commercially successful. The film won the National Film Award for Best Feature Film in Telugu that year, while Malhotra received the Nandi Special Jury Award and the Filmfare Best Villain Award (Telugu) for his performance. The film was remade in Tamil as Naam (2003) and in Malayalam as Wanted (2004).

== Plot ==
Irfan Khan is a key mafia affiliate in Mumbai. He is on the wanted list of criminals in Hyderabad with a bounty of ₹50 lakh. Aiming to migrate to Dubai so that he can remotely control the operations in Mumbai, Khan devises a plan of getting four of his own men to hijack a domestic flight from Hyderabad to Kathmandu (destined for Mumbai) in which he is a passenger. The Home Minister of Maharashtra is also on the flight, and the four men are to release all the passengers and concentrate on the Home Minister. From Kathmandu, he plans to go to Dubai.

For the hijack, he organizes a group of four intelligent men who are in dire need of money and who do not have a criminal record. The audience is made to believe in the beginning that the four central characters are these four men, but in fact, they kidnap Khan before the flight takes off, aiming to get the prize money.

They hide Khan in a forest and call the Assistant Commissioner of Police, who is a double agent for the mafia. When the ACP does not yield (as he wants them to release Khan), one of the four men, Kumar, makes a deal with the mafia and obtains a bag with ₹2 crore. However, the bag in which the money is kept contains a bomb. When Kumar tells the others that he has done this, they back out, and he joins with them, just in time.

Meanwhile, Khan's assistant, Musharraf, comes and takes Khan from the forest but is stopped by IB agent Zaheer Khan, who has been following the four men and Musharraf throughout.

Finally, the four friends come back to their house. They find a bag, which they had lost previously. With that, they find a note from Zaheer explaining everything. The bag also has, to their joy, their prize money.

== Cast ==
- Mohit Chadda as Ramu
- Shashank as Kumar
- Janardhan as Shankar
- Abhishek as Vivek
- Sindhu Tolani as Aditi
- Pavan Malhotra as Irfan Khan
- Veerendra Chowhan as Musharraf
- Likhita as Kavitha
- Narsing Yadav as the Maharashtra home minister
- Sivaji Raja as Zaheer Khan
- C. V. L. Narasimha Rao as Vivek's father
- Ashok Kumar as Madan Seth
- Harsha Vardhan as Chotu
- Sanjay Raichura as an ACP
- Lalith Sharma as the IB chief

== Production ==
The film marked the debut of Chandrasekhar Yeleti, Ravinder and K. K. Senthilkumar as director, art director and cinematographer respectively. The simultaneously shot Hindi version 50 Lakh was co-produced by Percept Picture Company, featured additional dialogues by P. K. Mishra, music by Hanif, and was additionally edited by Amitabh Shukla.

== Soundtrack ==
This album marked the debut of Kalyani Malik as a composer. Despite having only one song, the audio launch was held at 21 May 2003 at Walden in Whisper Valley.

Aithe...

Soundtrack album by Kalyani Malik
- Released: 2003
- Recorded: 2003
- Genre: Soundtrack
- Length: 5:23
- Label: Surya Music
- Producer: Kalyani Malik

Kalyani Malik chronology
Aithe... (2003)	Naam (2003)

Track-List
No.	Title	Lyrics	Singer(s)	Length
1.	"Chitapata Chinukulu"	Sirivennela Seetharama Sastry	M. M. Keeravani	5:23
Total length:				5:23

== Reception ==
Idlebrain.com reviewer Jeevi rated the film 4/5 and appreciated Yeleti's screenplay and direction."This story is a very authentic story without any surrealism or traces of inspiration in it. Screenplay of 'Aithe' is terrific. The debutant director Chandra Sekhar Eleti proves himself as the new generation director with a good technical knowledge," he stated.

Praveen Lance Fernandez of The Times of India reviewed the Hindi version 50 Lakh and gave it 2 stars. He wrote: "50 Lakh has nothing to offer mainly because of its shoe-string budget and bad performances. But from the plot and screenplay point of view, this one definitely scores over a lot of other recent films." Fernandez opined that had some of the performances been better, the film would have received better acclaim. "The south actors are clearly uncomfortable acting in a Hindi film," he added.

== Awards ==
- National Film Award for Best Feature Film in Telugu - 2004
- Nandi Award for Best Story Writer - Chandra Sekhar Yeleti
- Nandi Award for Best Audiographer - Madhusudhan Reddy
- Nandi Special Jury Award - Pavan Malhotra
- Filmfare Best Villain Award (Telugu) - Pavan Malhotra

== Legacy ==
Mohit Chadda and Pavan Malhotra starred in the thriller film The Deal, which was later renamed Aithe Enti after the success of this film. A reboot titled Aithe 2.0 released in 2018.
