= Kathmandu Connection =

Indian 2021 web-series

- Genre: Crime Thriller
- Written by: Siddharth Mishra
- Directed by: Sachin Pathak
- Starring: Amit Sial; Aksha Pardasany; Anshumaan Pushkar; Gopal Datt; Umar Sharif
- Composer: Sneha Khanwalkar
- Country of origin: India
- Original language: Hindi
- No. of seasons: 2
- No. of episodes: 12

Production
- Producer: Ajay G Rai
- Editor: Nikhil Parihar
- Production company: Jar Pictures

Original release
- Network: SonyLIV
- Release: 23 April 2021 – 23 December 2022

Kathmandu Connection is an Indian Hindi-language web series directed by Sachin Pathak, starring Amit Sial, Aksha Pardasany, and Anshumaan Pushkar in the lead roles. While the first season of this show that was released was inspired by events from the 1993 Bombay blasts, the second edition depicts the events of the infamous IC 814 hijacking case from December 1999. Kathmandu Connection season 1 premiered on 23 April 2021, exclusively on SonyLIV. The teaser for season 2 was released on 13 December 2022, and the show is premiered on 23 December 2022.

== Plot ==
=== Season 1 ===
Kathmandu Connection's story commences with the investigation of the 1993 Bombay Blasts. The investigation progresses to unravel new clues with the mysterious murder of the investigating officer; the kidnapping of a hotelier and the stalking of a journalist. The mystery lies in the connection these three different cases share with Kathmandu, the capital of Nepal. production Designer Ajay Sharma.

=== Season 2 ===
The story begins with the infamous hijacking of IS-814 as it takes off from Kathmandu. As the investigation opens, a risk of a bigger international conspiracy is discovered. Investigating agencies are deployed to curb the possibility of the threat. On the other hand, a dreaded criminal is on the run and he joins hands with the mastermind of the conspiracy. All possibilities of a dreadful connection are traced back to Kathmandu. How will the chase conclude?

==== Episodic Synopsis ====
Episode 1

IC 814 is hijacked, and the state is brought down to compromise with the terrorists. Shivani Bhatnagar tracks this major conspiracy. Sunny is serving his jail term while ex-police officer Samarth lives his life in obscurity. Major revelations are made, disclosing Wajid as the key player.

Episode 2

Shivani gets closer to unraveling the grand scheme of things as she encounters Ashraf Baig, the slain Mirza's son. Sunny survives a major attack in jail. India and Pakistan agreed to hold bilateral talks. Wajid meets with the terrorist Masood and his associates to plan a larger attack.

Episode 3

Shivani is in trouble and is in Wajid's clutches. Sunny escapes prison and reaches Nepal for her rescue. Meanwhile, DSP Shravan ties up Samarth to nab the fleeing Sunny.

Episode 4

In Nepal, Sunny is frantically looking for Shivani, while Shravan and Samarth are tailing Sunny. Sunny finds her, but a big scuffle takes place, followed by a major mishap.

Episode 5

India and Pakistan prepare for the bilateral talks, and all the intelligence agencies are on their toes to avoid any mishaps. Wajid seizes the opportunity and uses a dejected Sunny to carry out his risky scheme. A team of R&AW agents led by Tasneem who are investigating the case joins forces with Samarth and his team.

Episode 6

The peace talks finally take place in Delhi under tight security. With great difficulty, Samarth and his team, with the help of R&AW agents, prevented the major conspiracy, resulting in a positive end to the summit. The state restores Samarth to his position with full honours. Samarth's alliance with Sunny is finally revealed. Wajid's more sinister plan, however, will be revealed soon.

== Cast ==
- Amit Sial as DCP Samarth Kaushik
- Aksha Pardasany as Shivani Bhatnagar
- Anshumaan Pushkar as Sunny
- Anurag Arora as Shravan Mishra
- Gopal Datt as Hitesh, CBI officer
- Vikram Singh Sodha as Trilok Kumar
- Sanjiv Chopra as DGP Madan Sharma
- Archna Sharma as Sushmita Kaushik.
- Zakir Hussain as Mirza Baig
- Prashant Kumar Narayanan as Wajid
- Harleen Sethi as Tasneem
- Umar Sharif as Ashraf Baig
- Gurpreet Bedi as Maya
- Ashok Pathak as Fazlu
- Rajeev Ranjan as ACP Ranjan Kumar

== Release ==
Kathmandu Connection Season 1 was released on 23 April 2021. The Season 2 released on 23 December 2022.

== Critical reception ==
=== Season 1 ===
Kathmandu Connection received mixed reviews from the critics. Arcchika Khurana from The Times of India stated the writing of the series does go out of track and takes the generic route. However, she further added that keeping the loopholes aside certain aspects of the series will keep the viewers hooked on it. Arushi Jain from The Indian Express appreciated the overall plot and the directors attention to details in the series, she further applauded the talented cast. Poulomi Das from Firstpost stated in her critical review that the series has all the ingredients for a crime thriller but unfortunately it builds up to nothing.Scroll.in wrote that the principal cast gave solid performances and an unfussy direction kept the series in the right track. Subhash K Jha gave a rating of 3/5 and wrote "Kathmandu Connection keeps you glued till the end". The Pioneer stated "the show seamlessly blends plot so as to keep you hooked". Malishka praised actors and stated "super performances, a gripping plot and a nuanced story".

=== Season 2 ===
Archika Khurana for The Times of India wrote "The way Harleen Sethi is dressed like a 90s heroine makes her look even more stunning. She was, however, unable to provide depth to her character Tasneem, an intelligence officer." Yatamanyu Narain for News18 wrote "So Kathmandu Connection 2 might not be as imaginative as it's [sic] first season but it takes you to a more sinister zone. It boasts of a gripping story which is set in place with choppy but mostly consistent style of story-telling. It's a decent watch owing to the enthralling performances by the actors, eargasmic background score, unpredictable twists and bends and how it assimilates real-life events into a fictional setup." Moumita Bhattacharjee for Latestly wrote "There is nothing novel left in this subplot even if you inject great performances and story structure. Whether you intend it or not, it ends up as 'been there seen that'. Kathmandu Connection suffers from that Deja Vu effect a lot."
