= Dulha Mil Gaya =

2010 Indian film by Mudassar Aziz

- Theatrical release poster
- Directed by: Mudassar Aziz
- Screenplay by: Mudassar Aziz
- Story by: Vivek Vaswani; Mudassar Aziz
- Produced by: Vivek Vaswani
- Starring: Fardeen Khan; Sushmita Sen; Ishita Sharma
- Cinematography: Sunil Patel
- Edited by: Sanjay Ingle
- Music by: Songs: Lalit Pandit; Guest Composition: Pritam Chakraborty; Background Score: Lalit Pandit
- Distributed by: Insight Productions; Morpheus Media Ventures
- Release date: 8 January 2010
- Running time: 152 minutes
- Country: India
- Language: Hindi
- Budget: ₹25 crore

Dulha Mil Gaya (transl. Found the groom) is a 2010 Indian Hindi-language romantic comedy film directed by Mudassar Aziz. The film stars Fardeen Khan, Sushmita Sen and Ishita Sharma, with Shah Rukh Khan making a special appearance. It was released on 8 January 2010.

== Plot ==
The story focuses on Donsai, the heir to the Dhanraj Empire. Donsai is extremely against marriage and believes one should never ruin his life by getting married. After the passing of his father, Suraj Rattan Dhanraj, the only way to inherit his father's five-billion dollar company is to marry his friend's Punjabi daughter, Samarpreet. Donsai gets married in Punjab, and tells Samarpreet that he will return to Punjab after three months of business, though Donsai plans not to come back.

After three months, Samarpreet comes to Donsai's home in Trinidad and Tobago to look for him, where she finds him with another woman. She runs out crying, until she is hit by a car. The car owner, Shimmer, picks her up and takes Samarpreet to her home. When they get to Shimmer's home, it turns out Shimmer is one of Donsai's best friends. After Samarpreet gains consciousness, she tells Shimmer everything Donsai did to her. Shimmer decides to help Samarpreet and gives her a complete makeover—she even changes her name to "Samara".

After Donsai sees Samara (not knowing that she is his wife), he falls in love with her, and asks her out. Shimmer tells Samara to reject him; she accepts. Donsai then meets her on a yacht, where the two begin a conversation, and slowly Donsai decides to marry her. At the same time, Shimmer's plan is ruined, due to her boyfriend Pawan Raj Gandhi arriving unexpectedly for Karwa Chauth. Pawan realizes Samarpreet's problem, and offers to help out with the plan as well. Shimmer realises her feelings for PRG and she goes to meet him at the airport. At last Donsai accepts Samarpreet as his wife.

== Cast ==
- Ishita Sharma as Samarpreet Kapoor Dhanraj / Samara Capore
- Fardeen Khan as Tej "Donsai" Dhanraj
- Sushmita Sen as Shimmer Canhai
- Shah Rukh Khan as Pawan Raj Gandhi "PRG" (Special appearance)
- Mohit Chadda as Jigar Shah
- Tara Sharma as Tanvi
- Suchitra Pillai as Jasmine Kelson
- Howard Rosemeyer as Lotus
- Parikshat Sahni as Mr. Vishalpreet Singh Kapoor
- Beena Kak as Gurnaam Kaur Kapoor
- Vivek Vaswani as Mr. Vakil
- Johnny Lever as Hussain Bhai
- Anushka Manchanda as Shyla
- Nataliya Kozhenova as Jenny
- Mohammad S. Hyderabadwala as Benson
- Farid Currim as Sam
- Randhir Kapoor as Suraj Rattan Dhanraj (Special appearance)

== Production ==
=== Casting ===
Sushmita plays the role of a successful supermodel called Shimmer. Shahrukh Khan was set to make a 60-minute appearance in the film. He filmed about 17 scenes and three songs. Among the three, one is his entry sequence. Khan enters the film only in the second half, and though he was a part of the publicity, it was only within the parameters of his role. Dulha Mil Gaya was not marketed as a Shahrukh Khan film.

=== Filming ===
About half of the film was shot in Amritsar and Mumbai. The other half was filmed in Trinidad and Tobago over a month and a half period in 2007, making it the first Bollywood film to be shot in the islands. Production was delayed a year and a half while Shahrukh Khan found time to shoot his scenes. Production was further delayed when Khan injured his shoulder during an action scene.

== Reception ==
=== Critical response ===
Taran Adarsh of Bollywood Hungama gave the film 1.5 out of 5, writing, "Merely assembling A-listers and filming the movie at panoramic locations isn't enough. The film ought to have meat and that's missing here." Shubhra Gupta of The Indian Express gave the film 2 out of 5, calling it a "light-hearted fun, for the most part."

=== Box office ===
Dulha Mil Gaya made ₹ 3 crore in India. Rediff.com declared it a "Flop."

In Trinidad and Tobago, the film was a success and ran for several weeks in packed cinema houses.

== Soundtrack ==
Dulha Mil Gaya 2.0

Soundtrack album by Lalit Pandit and Pritam Chakraborty
- Released: 14 December 2009
- Genre: Film soundtrack
- Length: 55:23
- Label: Eros Entertainment, T-Series EROS INDUSTRIES MP3CD
- Producer: Lalit Pandit, Pritam Chakraborty, Mudassar Aziz, Richard Mithra, Kashinath Kashyap, Abani Tanti

The soundtrack was composed by Lalit Pandit and released on 14 December 2009. The lyrics are written by Mudassar Aziz; songs are arranged by Richard Mithra and Kashinath Kashyap, and all songs are mixed and engineered by Abani Tanti. The song "Shirin Farhad" had music composed by Pritam Chakraborty and lyrics by Kumaar. According to Pandit, he had to listen to hip hop music to compose the album as he had never heard songs of the genre and had no experience writing hip-hop tracks.

=== Track listing ===
No.	Title	Performer(s)	Length
1.	"Dulha Mil Gaya"	Daler Mehndi	5:02
2.	"Akela Dil"	Adnan Sami and Anushka Manchanda	4:41
3.	"Aaja Aaja Mere Ranjhna"	Swananda and Anushka Manchanda	5:37
4.	"Magar Meri Jaan"	Anushka Manchanda, Mahua and Lalit Pandit	4:38
5.	"Tu Jo Jaan Le"	Sonu Nigam	5:13
6.	"Rang Diya Dil"	Shreya Ghoshal	5:25
7.	"Dilrubaon Ke Jalwe"	Amit Kumar and Monali Thakur	6:03
8.	"Rang Diya Dil" (Sad version)	Shreya Ghoshal	0:50
9.	"Shirin Farhad" (Bonus Track, composed by Pritam Chakraborty)	Neeraj Shridhar and Tulsi Kumar	4:46
10.	"Akela Dil" (Remix)	Adnan Sami and Anushka Manchanda, remixed by DJ A-Myth	4:03
11.	"Dulha Mil Gaya" (Remix)	Daler Mehndi, remixed by DJ A-Myth	4:34
12.	"Dilrubaon Ke Jalwe" (Remix)	Amit Kumar and Monali Thakur, remixed by DJ A-Myth	4:31
