= Maalik (2025 film) =

2025 Indian film by Pulkit

- Theatrical release poster
- Directed by: Pulkit
- Written by: Jyotsana Nath; Pulkit
- Produced by: Kumar Taurani; Jay Shewakramani
- Starring: Rajkummar Rao; Prosenjit Chatterjee; Manushi Chhillar; Saurabh Shukla
- Cinematography: Anuj Rakesh Dhawan
- Edited by: Zubin Sheikh
- Music by: Songs: Sachin-Jigar; Score: Ketan Sodha
- Production companies: Tips Industries; Northern Lights Films
- Distributed by: Pen Marudhar
- Release date: 11 July 2025
- Running time: 152 minutes
- Country: India
- Language: Hindi
- Box office: est. ₹26.30 crore

Maalik (transl. Master) is a 2025 Indian Hindi-language action thriller film directed by Pulkit and produced by Kumar Taurani and Jay Shewakramani. The film stars Rajkummar Rao in the titular role, alongside Prosenjit Chatterjee and Manushi Chhillar.

Maalik was released on 11 July 2025, and received mixed reviews from critics.

== Plot ==
The film is set in the late 1980s in Allahabad, Uttar Pradesh. The narrative introduces Deepak (Rajkummar Rao), a young man from a farming family whose life takes a violent turn. Deepak, an aspiring student studying in Allahabad University, listens to respected Minister Shankar Singh (Saurabh Shukla) a.k.a. Dadda's speech and feels inspired and invigorated. His father (Rajendra Gupta), an ordinary farmer, Bindeshwar, is severely injured by Langda, a man assigned by Dadda to encroach the farmer's field. Langda orders his men to drive a tractor on the elderly man, while he was attempting to protect his employer's fields from encroachment. Driven by a desire for vengeance, Deepak first confronts Dadda, and when the latter allows the former to do so, tracks down and brutally kills Langda with the help of a Pandit. This act initiates Deepak's descent into the criminal underworld.

Following this initial act of violence, Deepak adopts the moniker "Maalik" (Master/Owner) and begins his ruthless ascent. He systematically builds a criminal empire amidst the volatile socio-political landscape of Allahabad, navigating intricate relationships with political figures, rival gangs, and figures such as the powerful MLA, Balhar Singh (Swanand Kirkire), his mentor Dadda, and business rival Chandrashekhar (Saurabh Sachdeva).

Chandrashekhar persuades Balhar Singh to deal with the increasing influence of Maalik. Balhar assigns a suspended police officer from Bengal, Prabhu Das (Prosenjit Chatterjee), who claims to have had 98 encounters, to apprehend Maalik. Prabhu barges into and investigates Maalik's house, where Maalik was not present for the time being. He threatens Maalik's parents, and abuses Maalik's wife Shalini (Manushi Chhillar), making her shed tears. As an act of revenge, Maalik sends his men to kidnap Prabhu's grandson, Debu. He, however, releases Debu, warns Prabhu against doing such an act in future, and openly challenges him into combat, before leaving.

Chandrashekhar murders Ramsevan Ghosh, who was responsible for the transport functions in Maalik's business, making Maalik suffer significant losses. Maalik warns Dadda and Balhar against meddling with his business affairs. Since the murder of Ramsevan Ghosh did not affect Maalik's business too heavily, Chandrashekhar decides to seize Maalik's factory. Maalik and his men shoots and murders all of Chandrashekar's men allotted there. Defeated, a desperate Chandrashekhar seeks Balhar's help, and the two successfully manage to rage-bait Prabhu Das into directly attacking Maalik, though without success. Maalik manages to defeat Prabhu's officers with the help of his loyal associate, Badauna (Anshumaan Pushkar). Maalik stands for the elections, a decision which is heavily opposed by both Dadda and Balhar. Dadda, though acting pleasurably and supportive in front of Maalik, decides to guide Balhar, Chandrashekhar and Prabhu secretively. Prabhu guards the Allahabad borders, Chandrashekhar's men annex Maalik's hiding spots and Balhar aggressively opposes Maalik's chances of winning elections. Enraged, Maalik uncovers new weapons, like the AK-47 and the AK-56. He successfully attacks Dadda's house with his new weapons and manages to murder Dadda with his bare hands.

Despite his increasingly violent and authoritative public persona, Maalik maintains a strong connection with his parents and his wife. Shalini frequently attempts to persuade him to abandon his criminal life, especially after she becomes pregnant. Maalik almost surrenders on Shalini's request, but vacillates when Badauna informs him that Shalini was shot dead by Chandrashekhar's henchmen. Maalik hangs the four responsible henchmen single-handedly, and then moves on to murder Chandrashekhar in front of his son.

Balhar calls Maalik to apparently negotiate, but Maalik's gang soon realizes that they had been ambushed by police. Balhar is shot by Badauna and the gang escapes. However, one by one, all of Maalik's gang is shot dead. Police forces also suffer heavy loss, but under Prabhu's instructions, manage to surround Maalik and Badauna. There, Badauna performs a strange act by murdering Pandit. He lets Maalik know that it was him who got Maalik's wife killed in cahoots with Prabhu and Balhar. Badauna never intended to surrender and wanted to take over Maalik's empire and prestige. This was the sole reason for which he murders Balhar directly, informs Maalik about Dadda's influence (which made Maalik murder his mentor), blames Chandrashekhar for Shalini's death (which led to Maalik shooting Chandrashekhar), and hired henchmen to murder Shalini. That was why Badauna also murdered Maalik's workers and Pandit. It was Badauna who informed the police about Maalik's arrival at Balhar's home, not Balhar himself.

Maalik is seriously injured by Badauna before Badauna walks away, and police sets the place on fire. A few months later Badauna is elected an MLA and as Prabhu retires, he gets awarded for bringing Maalik down. However, as Prabhu enjoys the Durga Puja festival in Kolkata, Maalik emerges from the crowd and the movie ends in a cliffhanger.

== Cast ==
- Rajkummar Rao as Deepak alias "Maalik"
- Prosenjit Chatterjee as Prabhu Das
- Manushi Chhillar as Shalini
- Huma Qureshi as Mallika
- Saurabh Sachdeva as Chandrashekhar
- Saurabh Shukla as Minister Shankar Singh alias "Dadda"
- Anshumaan Pushkar as Badauna
- Swanand Kirkire as Balhar Singh
- Rajendra Gupta as Bindeshwar, Deepak / Maalik's father
- Baljinder Kaur as Parvati, Deepak / Maalik's mother
- Yogi Raj as Langda

== Production ==
=== Development ===
On 4 July 2024, it was reported that filming would commence in September 2024, with locations set in Lucknow and Varanasi. To prepare for the physically demanding role, Rajkummar Rao worked on building a more muscular physique. The muhurat shot took place on 25 August 2024 in Pathakpur village. Vikram Dahiya was roped in to design the action sequences. Rao officially announced the film with a poster on 31 August 2024, coinciding with his 40th birthday.

=== Casting ===
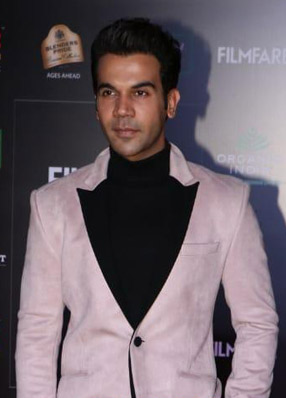
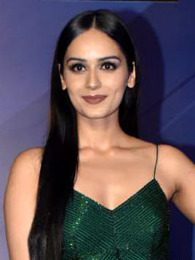
Rajkummar Rao (left) portrays the lead character, alongside Manushi Chhillar as female lead

Rajkummar Rao was cast in the title role, marking his second collaboration with director Pulkit after the historical drama Bose: Dead/Alive. Manushi Chhillar was cast the female lead, replacing Medha Shankr who was initially cast opposite Rao. Prosenjit Chatterjee was cast to play a police officer, marking his return to Hindi cinema nine years after Traffic (2016). The supporting cast consists of Anshumaan Pushkar and Swanand Kirkire. Additionally, Huma Qureshi was reported to make a cameo appearance.

=== Filming ===
Principal photography began in August 2024. The film had a continuous three-month shooting schedule, covering Lucknow, Varanasi, and Unnao. The first schedule begun in late August on the outskirts of Lucknow, along the Lucknow-Kanpur highway, featuring Rao and Chhillar. Filming also took place at Lucknow University's Subhash Hostel on 25 September 2024. The two-month Lucknow schedule concluded in mid-November 2024. Some scenes were shot at the District Hospital in Unnao.

The final schedule took place in Kanpur, concluding with the protagonist's wedding sequence on 14 November 2024. Rao also performed high-intensity action sequences, including weapon-based combat and Hand-to-hand combat.

== Music ==
Maalik

Soundtrack album by Sachin–Jigar
- Released: 11 July 2025
- Recorded: 2024–2025
- Genre: Feature film soundtrack
- Length: 18:50
- Language: Hindi
- Label: Tips Music

Sachin–Jigar chronology
Nadaaniyan (2025)	Maalik (2025)	Param Sundari (2025)
External audio
- Maalik - Full Album on YouTube

The film's soundtrack is composed by Sachin–Jigar with the lyrics written by Amitabh Bhattacharya. The background score is composed by Ketan Sodha.

The first single titled "Naamumkin" was released on 10 June 2025. The second single titled "Dil Thaam Ke" was released on 20 June 2025. The third single titled "Raaj Karega Maalik" was released on 4 July 2025.

Track listing
No.	Title	Singer(S)	Length
1.	"Naamumkin"	Varun Jain, Shreya Ghoshal	3:44
2.	"Dil Thaam Ke"	Rashmeet Kaur, Rana Mazumder	3:06
3.	"Raaj Karega Maalik"	Akasa Singh, MC SQUARE	3:36
4.	"Affair"	Khesari Lal Yadav, Shradha Mishra, Sachin-Jigar	3:16
5.	"Naamumkin" (Sad Version)	Varun Jain	2:03
6.	"Raaj Karega Maalik" (Rap Version)	MC SQUARE, Akasa Singh	3:05
Total length:			18:50

== Marketing ==
A pre-release event was held on 7 July 2025 at Raj Mandir Cinema in Jaipur.

== Release ==
=== Theatrical ===
Maalik was released on 11 July 2025.

=== Home media ===
The film began streaming on Amazon Prime Video from 5 September 2025.

== Reception ==
=== Box office ===
The film earned ₹4.02 crores on the opening day, much lower than Rao's previous release of the year, Bhool Chuk Maaf, which had earned ₹7 crores on its opening day. It managed to collect ₹20 crores by the end of 4 days.

=== Critical reception ===
The film received mixed reviews from critics. On the review aggregator website Rotten Tomatoes, 23% of 13 critics' reviews are positive, with an average rating of 4.7/10.

Subhash K Jha of News 24 gave 4 out of 5 stars and said that "Pulkit doesn’t put too much stress on the theme of social inequality. He just wants to tell a punitive story that keeps us on the edge of the seat. In that, Maalik scores brainy and brawny points."Firstpost gave the film 3.5 stars out of 5, and while feeling the narrative was tried-and-tested, praised the performances. India TV gave the film 3 out of 5 stars, praising the action sequences, direction, storyline and Rao's performance while finding the film overlong and Chatterjee's part poorly written. Devesh Sharma of Filmfare rated 3/5 stars and said that "Maalik is Rajkummar Rao’s Satya and Vaastav. He's at his visceral best in this gangster drama." Rishabh Suri of Hindustan Times rated 3/5 stars and writes that "Despite its flaws, Maalik stands tall, much like its hero, punching above its weight thanks to Rajkummar Rao’s fiery energy."

Bollywood Hungama gave the film 2 out of 5 stars, praising the direction and performances while finding the story clichéd and evoking a sense of déjà vu due to its similarities with other gangster films Vaastav and the Shootout series as well as the television series Khakee: The Bihar Chapter. Shubhra Gupta of The Indian Express gave 1.5 stars out of 5 and said that "A new gangster drama with old beats is not the break-out that Rao must have been hoping for." Anuj Kumar of The Hindu commented that "A typical gangster story born out of class struggle in the Hindi heartland, the film is less than the sum of its parts." Dhaval Roy of Hindustan Times gave the film 2/5 stars and argued that it was a clichéd and uninspired gangster drama with a weak, tedious plot despite solid performances and good technical work, offering little originality and that Maalik "can be skipped." Deepa Gahlot of Rediff.com awarded 2 stars out of 5 and said that "Maalik is just unpleasant, not even slightly engaging." Shreyas Pande of Cinema Express rated 1.5/5 stars and commented that "the film is content with just presenting Rajkummar in a templated gangster story." Sana Farzeen of India Today gave 2 out of 5 stars and observed that "Despite strong performances, the film struggles with clichéd storytelling and emotional disconnect." Rahul Desai of The Hollywood Reporter India said that "‘Maalik’ lacks both single-screen soul and multiplex gloss."
