= Family of Thakurganj =

2019 Indian Hindi-language action drama film

Family Of Thakurganj
- Theatrical release poster
- Directed by: Manoj K. Jha
- Written by: Dilip Shukla
- Produced by: Ajay Kumar Singh
- Starring: Jimmy Sheirgill; Mahie Gill; Saurabh Shukla; Sudhir Pandey; Supriya Pilgaonkar; Pavan Malhotra; Nandish Sandhu; Yashpal Sharma; Pranati Rai Prakash; Manoj Pahwa; Mukesh Tiwari; Mayank Narayan
- Cinematography: Yogesh Jani
- Edited by: Chandrashekhar Prajapati
- Music by: Sajid–Wajid
- Production company: Lovely World Entertainment
- Distributed by: Pen Marudhar Entertainment
- Release date: 19 July 2019
- Running time: 127 minutes
- Country: India
- Language: Hindi
- Box office: est. ₹ 15 Crore

Family Of Thakurganj is a 2019 Indian Hindi-language action drama film directed by Manoj K. Jha, and produced by Ajay Kumar Singh. The film stars Jimmy Sheirgill and Mahie Gill, and follows the influence of modern society on traditional values in a typical family. Principal photography of the film began in October 2018 in Lucknow,

== Cast ==
- Jimmy Sheirgill as Nannu
- Rama Mishra as Rima
- Mahie Gill as Sharbati
- Saurabh Shukla as Baba Bhandari
- Sudhir Pandey as Jagat Chacha
- Supriya Pilgaonkar as Sumitra Devi
- Pavan Malhotra as SP Rathore
- Mukesh Tiwari as Badri Pathak
- Nandish Singh as Munnu
- Yashpal Sharma as Sajjan Singh
- Pranati Rai Prakash as Suman
- Raj Zutshi as Ballu Thapa
- Salil Acharya as Murali
- Kalpesh Rajgor as Bambam
- Shivika Sodiyan as Lali
- Priya Mishra as Lata
- Manoj Pahwa as Gagan Guru
- Harshit Gupta as Shankar
- Vishal Singh as young Nannu
- Eshu as young Munnu
- Sujal as young Riaz
- Ramesh Chandra Pathak as Lala
- Ajay Singh as Dashrath
- Mayank Narayan as Head Police Officer
- Rakesh Dubey as constable Vaibhav Yadav

== Soundtrack ==
Family of Thakurganj

Soundtrack album by Sajid–Wajid
- Released: 27 June 2019
- Recorded: 2019
- Genre: Feature film soundtrack
- Language: Hindi
- Label: Zee Music Company

Sajid–Wajid chronology
3 Dev (2019)	Family of Thakurganj (2019)	Dabangg 3 (2019)

The music of the film is composed by Sajid–Wajid and lyrics by Danish Sabri. The rap for song "Fancy Thumke" was by Parry G. The songs are rendered by Mika Singh, Sonu Nigam, Shreya Ghoshal, Dev Negi and Jyotica Tangri.

Track listing
No.	Title	Lyrics	Music	Singer(s)	Length
1.	"Fancy Thumke" (Rap by Parry G)	Danish Sabri	Sajid–Wajid	Mika Singh, Dev Negi, Jyotica Tangri	5:07
2.	"Hum Teri Ore Chale"	Danish Sabri	Sajid–Wajid	Sonu Nigam, Shreya Ghoshal	5:36
