= Mohit Chadda =

Indian actor

- Born: Mumbai, Maharashtra, India
- Other name: Mohit Chadha
- Occupation: Actor
- Years active: 2003–2010; 2021–present
- Spouse: Ishita Sharma (m. 2011)
- Website: Official Website

Mohit Chadda is an Indian actor producer, director, and entrepreneur known for his work across Hindi, Telugu and Tamil films. His first Telugu film as an Actor, Aithe won the National Film Award for the Best Telugu Feature Film. The next year, he starred in the thriller film Aithe Enti (2004). He was seen in the 2010 films Dulha Mil Gaya and Do Dooni Chaar although his role in the latter was shortened. He was also adjudged first runner-up on the Zee TV reality show India's Best Cinestars Ki Khoj in 2004. In 2021, he played a lead role in Flight (2021). Over the years, Mohit transitioned from acting into directing and content production, expanding his work into documentaries, streaming content, branded entertainment, and advertising. As a director, his notable projects include Flight (2021), India’s Biggest Foodie, Infinite India: The Bharatiya Way, Main Aisa Kyun Hoon?, and The Filmy Hustle. Through his production company, Crazy Boyz Entertainment Pvt. Ltd., he has been involved in the development of feature films, digital media, and branded content, establishing himself as a multifaceted figure in the Indian entertainment industry.

== Early life and career ==
Mohit Chadda was born in Mumbai, Maharashtra, India. He began his acting career in the early 2000s and made his feature film debut with the Telugu thriller Aithe (2003), directed by Chandra Sekhar Yeleti. The film received critical acclaim and won the National Film Award for Best Feature Film in Telugu.

In 2004, Chadda participated in the reality talent show India's Best Cinestars Ki Khoj on Zee TV, where he finished as the first runner-up

== Acting Career ==
Following the success of Aithe, Chadda appeared in films across multiple Indian film industries. His acting credits include Ammayilu Abbayilu (2003), Aithe Enti (2004), Adhu (2004), 50 Lakh (2007), Dulha Mil Gaya (2010), and Do Dooni Chaar (2010).

After a period away from mainstream cinema, he returned in 2021 as the lead actor in the aviation action thriller Flight , portraying Ranveer Malhotra. The film marked his return to a leading role and was released theatrically and on digital platforms.

== Transition to Direction and Entrepreneurship ==
Following his acting career, Mohit Chadda diversified into production, direction, and entrepreneurship. He founded Crazy Boyz Entertainment Pvt. Ltd., a media and entertainment company involved in film production, digital content, branded entertainment, advertising, and visual effects.

Alongside his work as an actor and producer, Mohit established himself as a director in the fields of advertising, branded entertainment, documentary programming, podcast content, and digital media. His work includes commercial campaigns, documentary series, streaming content, and talk-show formats.

== Directing Career ==
Mohit Chadda's directing work spans advertising films, documentary programming, streaming content, and branded entertainment.

Among his notable directing projects is India's Biggest Foodie, on JioHotstar, a game show where 100 foodies from across India indulge in competitions of eating various crazy things. The series is hosted by Harsh Gujral. Mohit is credited as the creator of the series.

He also directed Infinite India: The Bharatiya Way, a documentary series hosted by Amish Tripathi that explores India's civilisational heritage, history, philosophy, and cultural traditions.

In the non-fiction space, Chadda directed Main Aisa Kyun Hoon?, a JioHotstar series hosted by digital creator Arun Pandit. The series was produced by Crazy Boyz Entertainment Pvt. Ltd.

Chadda also directed The Filmy Hustle, a podcast and entertainment-industry interview series featuring film exhibitor and entrepreneur Akshaye Rathi.

Also not only did act and write Flight but is also credited as the creator of the film. From idea to release was done by him single handedly using all his relationships in the film industry.

In addition to long-form content, Mohit has directed advertising campaigns and branded content projects for several brands, including campaigns for OnePlus featuring Indian cricketer Sanju Samson. His directing work extends across technology, consumer products, hospitality, entertainment, and digital media sectors.

== Production and Media Ventures ==
Through his involvement in production and media ventures, Mohit has worked across feature films, streaming platforms, advertising campaigns, documentaries, branded entertainment, podcast content, and digital-first programming. His work encompasses content development, creative direction, production management, and post-production services.

== Personal life ==
Mohit Chadda is married to actress Ishita Sharma.

== Filmography ==
Year	Film	Role	Language	Notes
2003	Aithe	Ramu	Telugu	
2003	Ammayilu Abbayilu	Sanjay "Sanju"	Telugu	
2004	Aithe Enti	Sanjay	Telugu	
2004	Adhu	Arvind	Tamil	credited as Aravind
2007	50 Lakh	Ramkrishna 'Ramu' Varma	Hindi	
2010	Dulha Mil Gaya	Jigar	Hindi	
2010	Do Dooni Chaar	Rahul	Hindi	
2021	Flight	Ranveer Malhotra	Hindi	

=== As Director ===
Year	Title	Format
2021	Flight - Credited as Created by	Feature Film
2025	India's Biggest Foodie	Streaming Series
2026	Infinite India: The Bharatiya Way	Documentary Series
2025	Main Aisa Kyun Hoon?	Streaming Series
2025	The Filmy Hustle	Podcast / Interview Series
Various	OnePlus Nord CE Lite featuring Sanju Samson Maruti Suzuki eVitara x WOF, Maruti Suzuki Dzire x Indian Idol, Maruti Suzuki Swift x IBF, Mahindra Tractors, SLING TV Champions Trophy, Foodpanda, Future Generali, Mahindra Solution Selling, Pay Lala, Kotak,	TVC and Digital Films
