= Sakkarakatti =

- Theatrical release poster
- Directed by: Kala Prabhu
- Written by: Kala Prabhu
- Produced by: Kalaipuli S. Thanu
- Starring: Shanthanu; Ishita Sharma; Vedhika
- Cinematography: I. Andrew; Rasamathi
- Edited by: Prabhakaran (Film Editor); Ravishankar (Avid Editor)
- Music by: A. R. Rahman
- Production company: V Creations
- Distributed by: Kalaippuli Films International
- Release date: 26 September 2008
- Running time: 118 minutes
- Country: India
- Language: Tamil

Sakkarakatti (transl. Sugarcube) is a 2008 Indian Tamil-language romantic comedy film written and directed by Kala Prabhu (in his directorial debut) and produced by his father Kalaipuli S. Thanu. The film stars Shanthanu, the son of the late actor-director K. Bhagyaraj, in his first lead role. Ishita Sharma and Vedhika play the lead actresses. It featured a soundtrack composed by A. R. Rahman. Sakkarakatti was released on 26 September 2008 and did not perform well at the box office.

== Plot ==
Chennai-bred Yuvraj has had four close friends from childhood. He meets and falls in love with Deepali. Yuvraj's friend, Reema, is obsessed with him and wants to marry him, however, he only has eyes for Deepali. After Deepali sees Yuvraj with Reema, she becomes jealous and ignores Yuvraj when he follows her. Then, Yuvraj and Deepali get back together. Later, when she sees Yuvraj and Reema together again, Deepali starts ignoring him again. Yuvraj wants to prove that he was not with Reema, so his friends decide to throw a birthday party to mend the trio's fractured relationship. Deepali and Yuvraj finally unite.

== Cast ==
- Shanthanu as Yuvaraj
- Ishita Sharma as Deepali
- Vedhika as Reema (Voice dubbed by Chinmayi)
- Nizhalgal Ravi as Yuvaraj's father
- Lokesh Baskaran as Yuvaraj's friend
- Amit as Vikram
- Yugesh Kumar as Gokul
- Chitti Babu as Shop owner
- Crazy Mohan as Librarian
- Shobi (special appearance in the song "Taxi Taxi")
- Blaaze (special appearance in the song "Taxi Taxi")

== Production ==
The producer Kalaipuli S. Thanu launched Sakkarakatti at AVM Studios on 29 April 2006. His son Kala Prabhu made his directorial debut and Shanthanu Bhagyaraj, son of actor/filmmaker K. Bhagyaraj, made his debut as the lead actor. The film was set to feature Ishita Sharma and Sivi as the lead actresses, although Sivi was later replaced by Vedhika. Ocher Studios provided the visual effects for a song sequence. The song "Taxi Taxi" was reshot following the enormous response from the audience after the audio release.

== Soundtrack ==
The score and soundtrack were composed by A. R. Rahman. He was initially reluctant to compose the music for Sakkarakatti, saying he was busy with other projects, but agreed after the director suggested Rahman recycle songs from his Hindi films. Ultimately, Rahman recycled only two Hindi songs: "Chinnamma Chilakkamma" and "Yeh Rishta" from Meenaxi: Tale of Three Cities (2004) as "Chinnamma Chilakamma" and "Naan Eppodhu" respectively. The other four songs in Sakkarakatti were original. Chinmayi Sripada sang "I Miss You Da" under the pseudonym "Indai Haza", given to her by Rahman.

The audio launch of Sakkarakatti was held on 11 July 2008. "Taxi Taxi" won the "Kalakkal Paatu" award at the Moodukketha Mix Radio Awards, hosted by 92.7 Big FM.

Track listing
No.	Title	Lyrics	Singer(s)	Length
1.	"Taxi Taxi"	Na. Muthukumar, Viviane Chaix, Blaaze	Javed Ali, Viviane Chaix, Blaaze, Benny Dayal	5:46
2.	"Marudaani"	Vaalee	A. R. Rahman, Madhushree, Hentry Kuruvilla	6:27
3.	"I Miss You Da"	Pa. Vijay	Chinmayi Sripada (as Indai Haza)	6:05
4.	"Chinnamma Chilakamma"	Pa. Vijay	Benny Dayal, Chinmayi Sripada	5:36
5.	"Elay"	Na. Muthukumar	Naresh Iyer, Krish	5:55
6.	"Naan Epoudhu"	Pa. Vijay	Reena Bhardwaj	4:42
Total length:				34:31

== Release ==
Sakkarakatti was released alongside Sun Pictures' Kadhalil Vizhunthen on 26 September 2008, with the media hyping that it was a battle of two films with debutants and successful soundtracks. However, Sakkarakatti was not a box office success.

== Critical reception ==
Sify said, "Shantanoo has that star quality to him which is so rare to find these days. But he is wasted in a role in which he just romance his heroines and dances". Pavitra Srinivasan of Rediff.com wrote, "Sakkarakatti doesn't melt in your mouth, like its tagline says (Cho Chweet!) -- in fact, it's a tasteless lump of nothing".
