= Ayena =

2022 Indian documentary film

- Directed by: Siddhant Sarin
- Screenplay by: Siddhant Sarin
- Cinematography: Siddhant Sarin
- Edited by: Nilanjan Bhattacharya
- Music by: Gintaras Sodeika
- Production company: Teh Films
- Release date: 2022
- Running time: 70 minutes
- Countries: India, South Korea, Lithuania
- Language: Hindi

Ayena (Mirror) is a 2022 Indian documentary film directed by Siddhant Sarin and produced by Teh Films. The film follows the lives of two acid attack survivors, Ritu and Faraha, as they rebuild their lives while confronting social and personal challenges.

Anandraj, Shilpa (23 January 2024). "Siddhant Sarin's documentary, 'Ayena' to be screened in Bengaluru". The Hindu. ISSN 0971-751X.

== Plot summary ==
The documentary delves into the aftermath of acid attacks on Ritu and Faraha, highlighting their journey of healing and empowerment. It portrays their struggles with societal perceptions, personal trauma, and the pursuit of justice, while emphasizing the strength found in their friendship and shared experiences.

== Cast ==
- Ritu: A survivor sharing her story of recovery.
- Faraha: Another survivor highlighting similar struggles.

== Awards ==
Ayena was recognized at the 70th National Film Awards, where it won the Best Non-Feature Film award. The producer and director received the Swarna Kamal (Golden Lotus) along with a cash prize of Rs 3,00,000. The documentary has been screened at more than 12 international film festivals and has earned awards such as Best Feature at the DokuBoku International Film Festival, Best Film at the Oslo Film Festival 2023, and an award at the Bangkok Documentary Film Festival.

== International film festivals ==
The documentary was screened at over 12 international film festivals, including:

- Krakow Film Festival
- MAMI Mumbai Film Festival
- DOK.fest München
- Puerto Rico Film Festival
- Kino Pavasaris
- Oslo Film Festival
- Bangkok Documentary Film Festival
