= Saali Mohabbat =

2024 Indian thriller drama film directed by Tisca Chopra

- Official release poster
- Directed by: Tisca Chopra
- Written by: Tisca Chopra; Sanjay Chopra
- Screenplay by: Namrata Shenoy
- Produced by: Jyoti Deshpande; Dinesh Malhotra; Manish Malhotra
- Starring: Radhika Apte; Divyendu Sharma; Anurag Kashyap; Anshumaan Pushkar; Sauraseni Maitra; Sharat Saxena; Kusha Kapila; Srishti Srivastava; Aalekh Kapoor; Sarthak Dewan
- Cinematography: Vidushi Tiwari
- Edited by: Sanyukta Kaza
- Music by: Songs: Manan Bhardwaj; Gaurav Dagaonkar; Kumar Atul; Vishal Shah; Sangeet Patil; Anand Bhaskar; Score: Karan Kulkarni
- Production companies: Jio Studios; Stage5 Production
- Distributed by: ZEE5
- Release dates: 24 November 2024 (IFFI); 12 December 2025
- Running time: 108 minutes
- Country: India
- Language: Hindi

Saali Mohabbat is a 2024 Indian Hindi-language mystery thriller film written and directed by Tisca Chopra in her directorial debut. The film stars Radhika Apte, Divyendu Sharma, and Anurag Kashyap. It is produced by Jyoti Deshpande, Dinesh Malhotra and Manish Malhotra under Jio Studios and Stage5 Production. The film was world premiered at the 55th International Film Festival of India in Goa in 2024. It had a direct-to-digital release on ZEE5 on 12 December 2025.

== Summary ==
Present

The narrative begins as a story within a story. A woman named Kavita (Radhika Apte) is at a high-society party in Delhi, feeling out of place. She catches her husband cheating and, instead of confronting him, gathers the guests to narrate a fable-like story about a housewife named Smita. It is soon revealed that Kavita is actually Smita, having transformed her life and escaped her past.

Past

Smita lived in the fictional town of Fursatgarh with her husband, Pankaj (Anshumaan Pushkar), who was an alcoholic heavily in debt to a local casino boss. Pankaj aggressively pressures Smita to sell her ancestral property to pay off his debts. The tension escalates when Smita’s seductive cousin, Shalini (Sauraseni Maitra), comes to stay with them. Shalini soon begins an affair with Pankaj right under Smita's roof. To complicate matters further, Shalini also two-times Pankaj by getting involved with a corrupt local policeman named Ratan (Divyenndu). Driven by desperation, betrayal, and domestic abuse, Smita is pushed to the edge. One rainy night, both Pankaj and Shalini are murdered in Smita's house. Because she was present during the crime and directly impacted by the infidelity, Smita becomes the prime suspect. Cop Ratan leads the investigation into the killings, with suspicion swirling around Smita as motives are uncovered.

== Cast ==
- Radhika Apte as Smita / Kavita
- Divyenndu as Ratan Pandit
- Anurag Kashyap as Gajendra Bhaiya
- Anshumaan Pushkar as Pankaj Tiwari
- Sauraseni Maitra as Shalini Saxena
- Sharat Saxena as Maali
- Kusha Kapila as Diya
- Srishti Srivastava as Beauty Baby
- Lekha Prajapati as Malini
- Aalekh Kapoor as Vicky
- Sarthak Dewan as Sunil Mehra
- Pooja Sharma as Appu
- Vivek Dutta as Vivek
- Nikki Narula as Nikki
- Saransh Taneja as Saransh
- Chahat Arora as Chahat
- Anuj Khurana as Anuj

== Production ==
=== Development ===
The project marks Tisca Chopra's first full-length directorial work. Before taking on the film, she had directed short pieces and was already known for her acting career, including her role in Taare Zameen Par (2007).

The film was announced as a joint production between Jio Studios and Stage5 Production, making it the latter's first major feature after the company moved into long-form content.

Reports noted that Chopra shaped the script around the Geeta Colony double murder case, using the incident as a starting point rather than a direct retelling. The adaptation places the fictional narrative in a smaller town and focuses on the experiences of a housewife at the centre of the story.

=== Casting ===
Radhika Apte was cast in the lead role of Smita, an everyday character whose decisions gradually place her in difficult circumstances. Divyenndu Sharma, Anurag Kashyap, Anshumaan Pushkar and Sauraseni Maitra were announced as part of the ensemble cast.

== Marketing and release ==
=== Festival screenings ===
Saali Mohabbat had its world premiere at the 55th International Film Festival of India in Goa in 2024, where it was screened as part of the official selection. It was later shown at the Chicago South Asian Film Festival ahead of its release plans.

=== Digital release ===
In 2025, ZEE5 announced that the film would debut directly on its platform. The streaming release is scheduled for 12 December 2025 as a ZEE5 Original. The official trailer was released on 26 November 2025.

== Reception ==
Rahul Desai of The Hollywood Reporter India writes that "Tisca Chopra’s feature-length directorial debut is too familiar to be twisted." Anuj Kumar of The Hindu observed that "Tisca Chopra shows promise in her directorial turn, but the film’s predictable twists and familiar beats undermine its intrigue, making it less engaging than expected." Rishabh Suri of Hindustan Times gave 3 stars out of 5 and said that "Radhika Apte delivers a strong performance in Saali Mohabbat, but the film falters towards its climax."

Sreeparna Sengupta of The Times of India gave 3.5 stars out of 5 and said that "With 'Saali Mohabbat' debutant director Tisca Chopra weaves in a captivating suspense and delivers a sumptuous mystery that one can sink their teeth into." Shubhra Gupta of The Indian Express rated it 2/5 stars and said that "This is the kind of film that should leave you chilled, but the beats are familiar, you can see the climactic twist coming a mile off." Nandini Ramnath of Scroll.in stated that "The 104-minute film is low on suspense, and could have benefitted from sharper characterisation. Since the narrative is tilted towards a sequel, Tisca Chopra leaves matters hanging, rather than delivering a story that is complete in itself."

Deepa Gahlot of Rediff.com rated it 2.5/5 stars and discovered that "Saali Mohabbat escalates the hell-hath-no-fury-like-a-woman-scorned theme, and fashions a dark domestic thriller." Vinamra Mathur of Firstpost also rated it 2.5/5 stars and said that "Saali Mohabbat could have been so much more fun. After a point, there are no surprise elements left. No shocking revelations. It’s only Apte playing her cards and telling the audiences through the writing of the thriller." Prachi Arya of India Today gave 3.5 stars out of 5 and said that "Saali Mohabbat stands out not because it reinvents the crime-thriller genre, but because the film deals with it with sensitivity, letting dread simmer instead of exploding. While not every performance hits the mark and certain stretches may test your patience, it tries to reward viewers with a layered narrative, unexpected twists, and a final reveal that lingers long after the credits roll."
