= Disco (2012 film) =

- Directed by: Hari K. Chanduri
- Written by: Hari K. Chanduri
- Story by: Hari K. Chanduri
- Produced by: Abhinav Reddy
- Starring: Nikhil Siddharth; Sara Sharmaa
- Cinematography: V. Malhar Bhatt Joshi
- Edited by: Prawin Pudi
- Music by: Mantra Anand
- Production company: Style Entertainment
- Release date: 20 April 2012
- Running time: 140 minutes
- Country: India
- Language: Telugu

Disco is a 2012 Indian Telugu language comedy film directed by debutant Hari K. Chanduri and produced by Abhinav Reddy, under Style Entertainment. It stars Nikhil Siddharth and Sara Sharma. It was released on 20 April 2012.

== Cast ==
- Nikhil Siddharth as Disco
- Sara Sharmaa as Shiny
- Ashish Vidyarthi as Don
- M S Narayana as Surya Bhai
- Ali
- Raghu Babu
- Vijay Sai
- Prudhviraj
- Vijay Sai
- Subhashini
- Vamsi Paidithalli

== Production ==
This is the First film from Style Entertainment.

=== Filming ===
The film started its regular shooting on 24 June 2011 in Hyderabad. A schedule was started in the Pattaya, Thailand. The film unit shot a song on lead pair Nikhil and Sarah Sharma in Kerala schedule. Shooting completed in February 2012.

== Soundtrack ==
Nikhil‘s Disco soundtrack was launched on 6 March at Hyderabad. The first CD was released by V. V. Vinayak and was presented to producer Bellamkonda Suresh. Music for the film scored by Anand of Manthra fame.

Disco

Soundtrack album by Mantra Anand
- Released: 6 March 2012
- Recorded: 2011
- Genre: Feature film soundtrack
- Length: 28:50
- Language: Telugu
- Producer: Mantra Anand

Tracklist
No.	Title	Lyrics	Singer(s)	Length
1.	"Disco"	Bhaskarabhatla	Ranjith, Sravana Bhargavi, Noel Sean	4:07
2.	"Om Shanthi"	Ramajogayya Sastry	Achu, Ramya, Noel Sean	3:57
3.	"Anandam"	Ramajogayya Sastry	Rahul Nambiar	4:29
4.	"Latak Matak"	Bhaskarabhatla	Hemachandra	4:09
5.	"Prema"	Satya Devulapalli	Revanth	3:17
6.	"Disco" (Raggeeton Mix)	Bhaskarabhatla	DJ Shawn	3:59
7.	"Om Shanthi" (Big Room House Mix)	Ramajogayya Sastry	DJ Shawn	4:52
Total length:				28:50

== Release ==
The movie was given 'A' certificate. It was released on 20 April 2012.

=== Reception ===
The Times of India gave rating 2/5 and stated "Nikhil is his energetic self but he really cannot pull a whole movie by himself, at least not this one. The characterization, screenplay, music all borders on the mindless".
