= Filmfare Award for Best Villain – Telugu =

Former Indian annual film award

The Filmfare Best Villain Award – Telugu was given by the Filmfare magazine as part of its annual Filmfare Awards South for Telugu films from 2002 to 2005.

The award was introduced and first given at the 50th South Filmfare Awards in 2003, with Shafi being the first recipient. This category was discontinued after the 2005 edition of the awards. Here is a list of the award winners and the films for which they won.

Year	Actor	Role	Film
2005	Ashish Vidyarthi	Anna	Athanokkade
2004	Pradeep Rawat	Bhikshu Yadav	Sye
2003	Pavan Malhotra	Irfan Khan	Aithe
2002	Shafi	Azar	Khadgam

== See also ==
- Filmfare Awards (Telugu)
- Cinema of Andhra Pradesh
