= Babita Singh Reporting =

2026 Indian film

- Directed by: Ambiecka Pandit
- Written by: Amita Vyas
- Produced by: Saurabh Malhotra; Manoj Mittra; Tina Tharwani
- Starring: Nimisha Sajayan; Rajesh Kumar; Barun Sobti; Anshumaan Pushkar; Sunita Rajwar; Rajat Dahiya; Kuldeep Sareen
- Cinematography: Sunil Borkar
- Edited by: Tanya Chhabria
- Music by: Ajay Jayanthi
- Production companies: Film Squad Productions; Act Three
- Distributed by: Amazon Prime Video
- Release date: 28 August 2026
- Running time: 131 minutes
- Country: India
- Language: Hindi

Babita Singh Reporting is a Hindi-language crime drama film written by Amita Vyas and directed by Ambiecka Pandit under the banner of Film Squad Productions in association with Act Three for Amazon Prime Video. It stars Nimisha Sajayan, Rajesh Kumar, Anshumaan Pushkar and Barun Sobti in pivotal roles.

The film was released on 28 August on Amazon Prime Video.

== Plot ==
Baby finds herself compelled to uncover the truth in the murder investigation of her childhood friend Bansi Seni. She initiates a manhunt to find the murderer.

== Cast ==
- Nimisha Sajayan as ASI Babita Singh
- Rajesh Kumar as SI Sethi
- Geetika Vidya Ohlyan as Karamjeet
- Nawal Shukla as SHO Nawal Kishore Shukla
- Anshumaan Pushkar as Sharad Vashesht
- Barun Sobti as Bansi Seni
- Priyanka Setia as Rupa, Bansi's wife
- Sunita Rajwar as Babita's Mother-in-Law
- Kuldeep Sareen as Dussehra Contractor
- Priya Yadav as Guddi
- Alina Azeem as Bela, Bansi's daughter
- Rajat Dahiya as Bharadwaj

== Production ==
The film was announced by Amazon Prime Video on 19 March 2026. The film is Ambiecka Pandit's debut as a director. Sudip Sharma serves as Executive producer. The series was extensively shot at various locations in Madhya Pradesh like Bhopal and Vidisha

=== Casting ===
Nimisha Sajayan plays the titular character Babita Singh.

== Release ==
The film was released on 28 August 2026 on Amazon Prime Video.

== Critical reception ==
Archika Khurana for The Times of India rated the film 3.5/5 stars and opined "The pacing may test patience in places, but the strong performances, atmospheric storytelling and sensitive treatment of its protagonist make the film worthwhile." Rahul Desai of The Hollywood Reporter India described it as "A job well done". Shubhra Gupta of The Indian Express gave 2.5 stars out of 5 and said that "A small town woman, and the small town cop, sometimes one playing the other, are in the danger of becoming tropes, if they haven’t already." Sukanya Verma of Rediff.com gave 3.5 stars out of 5 and writes that "Babita Singh Reporting goes past the messy homes and humming markets to reflect the daredevilry of a protagonist coming into her own." Anuj Kumar of The Hindu writes that the director "mounts a small-town murder mystery which functions far more effectively as a breakdown of hypocrisy than as an unconventional procedural."

Sana Farzeen of India Today rated it 3/5 stars and said that "The film tackles patriarchy and self-worth but misses its full potential." Rishabh Suri of Hindustan Times gave 3 stars out of 5 and writes that "Nimisha Sajayan and Barun Sobti's solid performances keeps the viewer hooked, even when the film loses steam." Devesh Sharma of Filmfare rated it 3./5 stars and said that "Babita Singh Reporting is a murder mystery on one hand and a domestic drama which strikes a blow against patriarchy on the other." Kartik Bhardwaj of The New Indian Express stated "Sobti's brief but impactful performance left an imprint in my mind. Like Babita, you can feel his sad, amiable, looming presence in the film. A sense of innocence being lost." Agnivo Niyogi for The Telegraph wrote "Some red herrings do not quite hold up."
