= Anshumaan Pushkar =

Indian actor

- Born: 17 August 1993 (age 33); Mokama, Bihar, India
- Education: Rajiv Gandhi Institute of Technology, Mumbai
- Occupation: Actor
- Years active: 2018–present

Anshumaan Pushkar is an Indian actor known for his work in Hindi films. He is best known for playing the role of Rishi Ranjan in the Hotstar original series Grahan (2021) and Jamtara as Rocky on Netflix.

== Early life ==
Pushkar was born on 17 August 1993 in Mokama, a small town in the Patna district of Bihar.

== Filmography ==
Key
| † | Denotes films that have not yet been released |

=== Films ===
| Year | Title | Role | Notes |
|---|---|---|---|
| 2023 | 12th Fail | Gauri Bhaiya | |
| 2025 | Maalik | Badhauna | |
| 2025 | Saali Mohabbat | Pankaj Tiwari | ZEE5 film |
| 2026 | Babita Singh Reporting | Sharad Vashesht | Prime Video film |
| 2027 | Dragon † | Sujoy Sarkar | Telugu film |

=== TV Series ===
| Year | Title | Role | Notes | Ref(s) |
|---|---|---|---|---|
| 2018 | Chandrashekhar | | | |
| 2018 | Gandii Baat | Nagnath | Episodic role | |
| 2019 | Kapow | Shomu | | |
| 2020–2022 | Jamtara | Rocky | Netflix | |
| 2021 | Kathmandu Connection | Sunny | SonyLiv | |
| 2021 | Bhasad | Shomu | | |
| 2021 | Grahan | Rishi Ranjan | Hotstar | |
| 2022 | Country Mafia | Ajay | ZEE5 | |
| 2023 | Hajamat | | JioCinema | |
| 2024 | Moonwalk | Tariq Chand Pandey | JioHotstar | |
| 2025 | Delhi Crime Season 3 | Rahul/Amjad | Netflix | |
| 2026 | Satrangi: Badle Ka Khel | Bablu Mahto | ZEE5 | |
| 2026 | Akka | TBA | Netflix | |

=== Nominations ===
| Year | Award | Category | Work | Result | Ref(s) |
|---|---|---|---|---|---|
| 2021 | Filmfare OTT Awards | Best Actor (Drama, Series) | Grahan | Nominated | |
