= Pavan Malhotra =

Indian actor (born 1958)

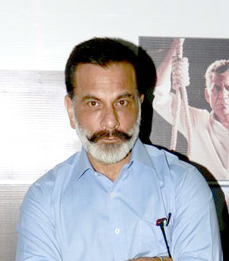
- Malhotra in 2017
- Born: 2 July 1958 (age 68); Delhi, India
- Occupation: Actor
- Years active: 1984–present

Pavan Malhotra (born 2 July 1958) is an Indian actor who works in Hindi films and television alongside Punjabi and a few Telugu films. He has received several awards, including a Filmfare OTT Award and a Filmfare Award South.

He has played lead roles in Buddhadeb Dasgupta's National Film Award-winning Bagh Bahadur and Saeed Akhtar Mirza's Salim Langde Pe Mat Ro, both released in 1989. He is known for his role as Irfan Khan in the Telugu film Aithe (2003) and in his acclaimed role of Tiger Memon in Black Friday (2004). In 2005, he acted in the Telugu movie Anukokunda Oka Roju as a Tantrik. He gained further acclaimed in SonyLIV's web series Tabbar (2021). He won National Film Award for Best Supporting Actor at 70th National Film Awards for the Haryanvi language-film Fouja (2023).

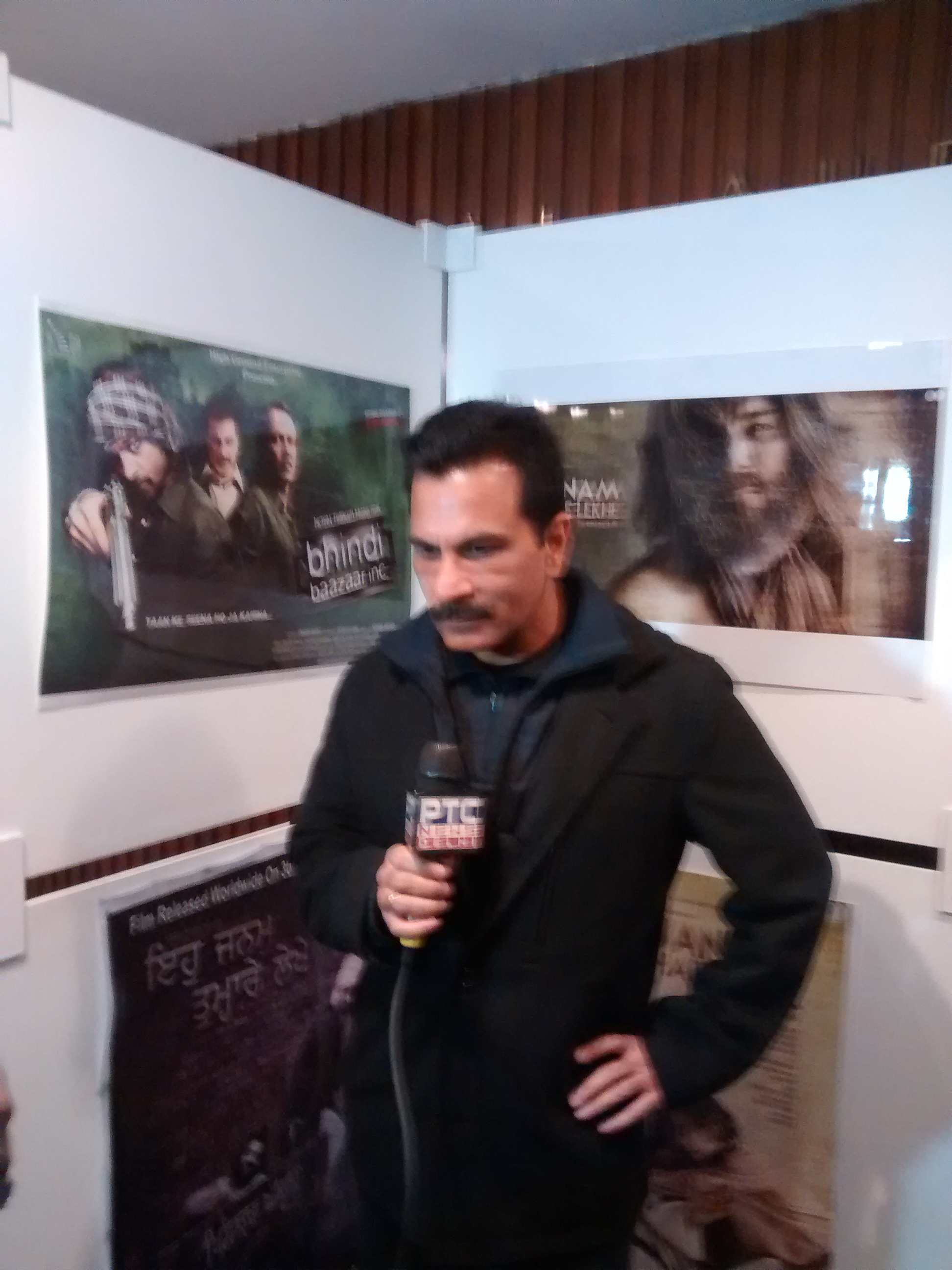
Pavan Malhotra speaking to a TV channel

== Early life and career ==
Malhotra was born in Delhi on 2 July 1958. His Punjabi family moved from Pakistan following the 1947 partition; his father ran a business of machine tools and he grew up with five siblings in Delhi's Rajendra Nagar neighborhood. He graduated in arts from Hansraj College, Delhi University. His first hand experience in movies was as an assistant in costume department of Gandhi. Thereafter he was production assistant in Jaane Bhi Do Yaaro, Khamosh and Mohan Joshi Hazir Ho!. Pavan ventured into the Delhi theatre circuit, thereafter he moved to Mumbai, where he started with the television industry as an assistant on the sets of the TV series, Yeh Jo Hai Zindagi (1984), before he got a role in Saeed Akhtar Mirza's TV series on Doordarshan, Nukkad (1986), which got him noticed. Meanwhile, he had entered the film industry and made his debut with Pankaj Parashar's Ab Ayega Mazaa (1984).

Over the years, he had worked with directors like Buddhadeb Dasgupta, Saeed Akhtar Mirza, Shyam Benegal, Deepa Mehta and Roland Joffé.

In 2006, he was seen in Manish Goswami's Aisa Des Hai Mera on Sony television. He is seen on the TV series Alag Alag and Partho Mitra's Patang on DD Metro. He recently starred in the major hit movies Jab We Met and Bhaag Milkha Bhaag. He is currently acting in Lagi Tujhse Lagan as Malmal More on Colors TV. He has also worked in hit movies such as Punjab 1984 and Children of War.

In 2016, a retrospective to mark his 25 years in cinema was held at India International Centre (IIC), Delhi.

In the latest Hindi web series Grahan on Disney+ Hotstar, he played the character of Rishi Ranjan/Gursewak Singh, father of Amrita Singh (Zoya Hussain), which was released on 24 June 2021. It was based on the Satya Vyas novel Chaurasi.

== Filmography ==
=== Hindi films ===
List of Hindi performances in films
Year	Film	Role	Notes	Ref.
1984	Ab Ayega Mazaa			
1986	Khamosh		also production manager	
1989	Bagh Bahadur	Ghunuram		
1989	Salim Langde Pe Mat Ro	Salim		
1991	Sau Crore			
1991	Antarnaad			
1992	City of Joy	Ashish		
1994	Tarpan	Dhannu		
1995	Brothers in Trouble	Amir		
1997	Pardes	Sharafat Ali		
1998	Earth	The Butcher		
1998	Fakir			
2003	The Perfect Husband			
2004	Black Friday	Tiger Memon		
2005	Eashwar Mime Co.			
2006	Don - The Chase Begins again	Narang		
2007	Blood Brothers	Coach		
2007	Jab We Met	Geet's Uncle		
2007	50 Lakh	Irfan Khan		
2008	My Name Is Anthony Gonsalves	Sikandar		
2008	De Taali			
2008	Maan Gaye Mughal-e-Azam	Qayyum Cable - Maut Ka Lable		
2009	Delhi-6	Jaigopal		
2009	Ek Tho Chance			
2009	Road to Sangam			
2010	Badmaash Company	Jazz		
2011	Ek Nayi Chhoti Si Zindagi	Shyam		
2011	Bhindi Bazaar	Mamu		
2011	Yeh Faasley	Digvijay Singh (Diggy)		
2011	Shaitan	Police Commissioner		
2013	Ek Thi Daayan	Mr. Mathur (Bobo's Dad)		
2013	Bhaag Milkha Bhaag	Coach Gurudev Singh		
2014	Bang Bang	Zorawar		
2014	Children of War	Malik		
2016	Rustom	Inspector Vincent Lobo		
2016	Missing on a Weekend	Inspector Ali Ansari		
2017	Mubarakan	Baldev Singh Bajwa		
2017	Judwaa 2	Officer Dhillon		
2019	Setters			
2019	Family of Thakurganj†			
2019	Abhi Toh Party Shuru Hui Hai†			
2021	Flight			
2023	72 Hoorain	Militant Hakim Ali		
2023	OMG 2	Judge Purushottam Nagar		
2023	Mission Raniganj	T.P. Bindal		
2024	Tera Kya Hoga Lovely	Hawa Singh		
2025	Ajey: The Untold Story of a Yogi			

Key
†	Denotes films that have not yet been released

Other language films

List of other language performances in films
Year	Film	Role	Language	Ref.
2003	Aithe	Irfan Khan	Telugu	
2004	Aithe Enti		Telugu	
2005	Anukokunda Oka Roju	Surya Swamy	Telugu	
2005	Andhrudu	Ranaveer Sinha	Telugu	
2006	Amma Cheppindi	Bose's Father	Telugu	
2014	Punjab 1984	Deep Singh Rana	Punjabi	
2015	Eh Janam Tumhare Lekhe	Bhagat Puran Singh	Punjabi	
2016	Zorawar	Tejpal Singh	Punjabi	
2017	Super Singh	Saint Rehmat	Punjabi	
2020	Ek Sandhu Hunda Si		Punjabi	
2023	Fouja		Punjabi	Haryanvi

=== Television ===
- Nukkad (1986) – Hari
- Ret Par Likhe Naam (TV Series 1984–1985)
- Zameen Aasmaan (1995)
- Aahat (1997-1999)
- XZone (1998)
- CID (1999-2007)
- Circus (1989)
- 9 Malabar Hill (1997)
- 2000 Alag Alag as Manoharlal
- Khamoshiyaan... Kab Tak (2001)
- Karishma – The Miracles of Destiny (2003 - 2004)
- Mrityudand
- Kahan Se Kahan Tak
- Laagi Tujhse Lagan (2009)
- Khidki (2016)
- Grahan (2021)
- Tabbar (2021)
- Pill (2024)
- Court Kacheri (2025)

== Awards ==
- National Award – Fakir (Hindi) – 1998
- Nandi Special Jury Award – Aithe (Telugu) – 2003
- Filmfare Best Villain Award (Telugu) - Aithe – 2003
- 2022 Filmfare OTT Awards - Tabbar 2022 (Best Actor in Drama Series)
- National Film Awards - Fouja 2023 Best Supporting Actor
