= Sikaisal =

Indian drama film

Sikaisal (Tiwa: If Only Trees Could Talk) is a 2022 Indian drama film directed by Bobby Sarma Baruah. The film is made in the Tiwa language and is based on the life of Maheswar Patar, a schoolteacher in the village of Ulukunchi in Assam. Sikaisal was awarded Best Tiwa Feature Film at the 70th National Film Awards and received a Special Jury Mention at the 28th Kolkata International Film Festival in 2023.

== Development and background ==
Director Bobby Sarma Baruah began work on Sikaisal in 2014, following a visit to the village of Ulukunchi in Assam. Over a period of seven years, she carried out research and developed the screenplay, based on events observed in the community and its educational challenges. The film presents a fictional narrative inspired by real-life experiences encountered during her visits. The storyline focuses on Maheswar Patar, a schoolteacher from Ulukunchi, who portrays himself in the film. He teaches at a bamboo-structured primary school that does not have formal recognition from the government. The film traces his continuous efforts to secure provincialisation for the school, including his engagements with various government departments. After the school receives official recognition and Patar retires, he learns that no new teacher has been appointed, leaving the children without instruction. He then begins teaching informally from his residence, while attempting to raise awareness within the community about the importance of formal education.

== Cast ==
- Maheswar Patar as Maheswar Patar
- Sadhani Amsi as Sadhani
- Kelmon Madar as Rajib
- Talbor Amsong as Talbor

== Plot ==
Sikaisal tells the story of Maheswar Patar, a schoolteacher in the village of Ulukunchi in Assam. The film portrays his efforts to promote education in a remote area and the various challenges he encounters in the process. It also highlights aspects of local culture and the community’s relationship with learning and development.

== Awards ==
- National Film Awards for Best Tiwa Feature Film
- Special Jury Mention Award at 28th Kolkata International Film Festival (2023)
