= Vijay Sai =

Indian comedian

- Born: K. Vijay Sai c. 1979
- Died: 11 December 2017 (age 37/38)
- Occupation: Actor
- Years active: 2000–2017

Vijay Sai, also known as Potti Vijay, was an Indian comedian who worked in Telugu-language films.

== Career ==
Vijay Sai made his lead film debut with Ammayilu Abbayilu (2003) before starring in Backpocket that same year. He played the lead role in both films. He has since starred in sixty films including Bommarillu (2006) and Current (2009).

== Personal life ==
In 2006, he married television actress N. Vanitha Reddy. He had been living separately from her since 2015. On 11 December 2017, Vijay Sai hanged himself on a ceiling fan. He was aged 38 at his death. He had recorded a video before his death claiming his wife and two other people demanded 3 crore Indian rupees from him.

== Filmography ==
Year	Film	Role	Notes
2000	Nuvve Kavali	Tarun's friend	
2003	Ammayilu Abbayilu	Prasad	Lead role
2003	Back Pocket		Lead role
2003	Okariki Okaru	Puchu	
2004	Preminchukunnam Pelliki Randi	Vijay	
2005	Youth	Babu's friend	
2005	Bhageeratha		
2005	Soggadu	Cable Madhu	
2006	Bommarillu	Vamsi	
2006	Party	Lab Incharge	
2007	Aa Roje		
2007	Paisalo Paramatma		
2007	Mantra		
2007	Konte Kurrallu		
2008	Ekaloveyudu		
2008	Nesthama		
2008	100 Katlu		
2008	Gita		
2009	Current	Giri	
2009	Naa Girlfriend Baga Rich		
2009	Indumathi		
2010	Dammunodu		
2010	Taj Mahal	Swami	
2010	Andari Bandhuvaya	Nandu's friend	
2010	Don Seenu	Seenu's friend	
2011	Vara Prasad Potti Prasad	Potti Prasad "PP"	
2011	Mangala		
2012	All The Best		
2012	Disco		
2013	Chukkalanti Ammayi Chakkanaina Abbayi		
2013	Dasa Thirigindi		
2013	Mr Manmadha		
2013	Om 3D		
2014	Chusinadiki Chusinantha		
2015	Dhanalakshmi Talupu Tadite		
2016	Kavvintha		
2017	Prathi Kshanam		
2017	Vajralu Kavala Nayana		
2019	Kothaga Maa Prayanam		Released posthumously
2020	302		Released posthumously
