= Ammayilu Abbayilu =

2003 film by Ravi Babu

- Directed by: Ravi Babu
- Written by: Nivas (dialogues)
- Screenplay by: Ravi Babu
- Produced by: P. Kiran
- Starring: Mohit; Vijay Sai; Sonu Sood; Debina Bonnerjee; Vidya; Swapna Madhuri
- Cinematography: M. B. Joshi
- Edited by: Marthand K. Venkatesh
- Music by: Chakri
- Production company: Anandi Art Creations
- Distributed by: Gemini Television
- Release date: 30 January 2003
- Country: India
- Language: Telugu

Ammayilu Abbayilu (transl. Girls and boys) is a 2003 Indian Telugu-language romantic film directed by Ravi Babu starring Mohit, Vijay Sai, Sonu Sood, Debina, and Vidya. The film was remade in Kannada as Neenandre Ishta Kano (2013).

== Cast ==
- Mohit as Sanjay "Sanju"
- Vijay Sai as Varaprasad "VP"
- Sonu Sood as Rakesh, Anju's Cousin (voice dubbed by Ravi Babu)
- Debina Bonnerjee as Anju, Rakesh's cousin
- Swapna Madhuri as Ranjani
- Vidya Rao as Manju
- Jaya Prakash Reddy as Rakesh's father
- Apoorva as Varaprasad's mother
- Krishna Mohan as Pandurang Prasad, Varaprasad's father
- Krishna Bhagavaan as Manmadha Rao, Manju's father
- Subhashini as Manju's mother
- Chalapati Rao as Anju's father
- Surya as Sanjay's father
- Chitram Srinu as Bulli
- Dharmavarapu Subramanyam in multiple roles as College Principal, Swimming Pool Instructor, Police Officer, Colony Secretary, Current Lineman
- Lakshmipati as Simpiri
- MS Narayana as Film Writer
- Ravi Babu as Film Director
- Ramya Sri as Film Director's Personal Assistant
- Tirupathi Prakash as Film Dancer
- Devi Charan as Charan
- Duvvasi Mohan as Constable
- Kalpana Rai as Neighbour
- Bandla Ganesh as Man in manhole

== Soundtrack ==
The music of this film was composed by Chakri and the lyrics were written by Bhaskarabhatla Ravikumar.

No.	Song	Singers	Length (m:ss)
1	"Nijam Cheppamante"	Chakri, Kousalya	04:20
2	"Neeloni Andhalu"	Srinivas, Kousalya	04:37
3	"Subbaroa Subbarao"	Ravi Verma, Kousalya	04:05
4	"Prema o Prema"	Ravi Verma, Kousalya	05:50
5	"Nuvveppudocchavo"	Sandeep, Kousalya	04:08
6	"Ishtapadi Istapadi"	Srinivas, Kousalya	05:33

== Reception ==
Jeevi of Idlebrain.com wrote that "The film is a let down for movie lovers who expected another good film from Ravi Babu. The assets of the film are artwork by Bhupesh and music by Chakri. The main drawback of the film is insipid screenplay, lack of nativity and artificial characterization. The scenes that depict sex are bland in the film". A critic from The Hindu wrote that "It is not a film to be taken seriously nor to get entertained. . The cast is full of new faces and is difficult to find who plays which role. Histrionically speaking they are all a set of amateurs". A critic from Full Hyderabad wrote that "It will take us another 10 good films for viewers to recover from horrendous fare like this one. Hmmm, that means you have to wait a lifetime to get over Ammayilu Abbayilu". Telugu Cinema wrote "Definitely Ravibabu is a talented Director, but his style of making is not appreciable and it wouldn’t attract the family crowds, it is difficult to see such a Film with family at least an hour. Direction is great and he showed his talent in his debut movie Allari and he used the talent in this too. First half of the film is full of comedy but the Director has lost the grip in second half. One gets confused about the Sentiment scenes in the second half, if the scene is sentiment or comedy. Screenplay in second half is not much attractive".
