= Satrangi: Badle Ka Khel =

Upcoming Indian Hindi-language crime drama television series

- सतरंगी: बदले का खेल
- Genre: Crime drama; Revenge thriller
- Created by: Dilip Bachchan Jha
- Screenplay by: Dilip Jha; Vikram Khurana
- Directed by: Jai Basantu Singh
- Starring: Anshumaan Pushkar; Kumud Mishra; RJ Mahvash
- Music by: Satendra Tiwari
- Country of origin: India
- Original language: Hindi
- No. of seasons: 1

Production
- Producers: Dilip Bachchan Jha; Ritesh Modi
- Cinematography: Navagat Prakash Sharma
- Editor: Jayant Verma
- Production company: RND Film LLP

Original release
- Network: ZEE5
- Release: May 22, 2026 – present

Satrangi: Badle Ka Khel (Hindi: Rainbow: The Game of Revenge) is an Indian Hindi-language crime drama streaming television series directed by Jai Basantu Singh. Produced under the banner of RND Films, the series stars Anshumaan Pushkar, Kumud Mishra, and RJ Mahvash.

== Synopsis ==
The series focuses on Bablu Mahto, the son of a Launda Naach practitioner, a traditional North Indian folk art where male actors perform in female attire. Following the murder of his father, Bablu is reluctantly drawn into the same profession while covertly orchestrating a plan of retribution against a locally dominant and powerful upper-caste family.

== Cast ==
- Anshumaan Pushkar as Bablu Mahto
- Mahvash as Aarti Singh
- Kumud Mishra as Sona Singh
- B. Shantunu as Bhagwan Pandey
- Jaihind Kumar as Hari Mahto
- Padma Damodaran
- Amir Khan as Akhilesh Pandey
- Atul Kusum Sanjay as Diamond Pandey
- Upen Chauhan as Pratap Singh
- Saddam Sophia Hussain as Radhe Singh
- Satish Badal as DSP Pankaj Kumar
- Kashsish Duggal as Priya Singh
- Bhawana Aneja as Rani Singh
- Rahul Sinha as Rajesh Singh
- Pramod Kumar as Ramesh Singh
- Raman Natta as Saajan
- Rdura Singh as Munna
- Rakesh Kumar as Kundan
- Priyal Singh as Rupa
- Roheet Raj Gajbhiye as Kjaru
- Satyam Arakh as Manoj
- Prateek Kashyap as Pramod
- Anmol Soni as Bicky
- Anuj as Saurav

== Production ==
The series was written by Dilip Jha, Vikram Khanna, and Sharad Tripathi, with action sequences choreographed by Mukesh Rathod.

== Release ==
The official trailer for the show was released by ZEE5 in early May 2026. The series premiered on 22 May 2026.

== Reception ==
Satrangi received generally mixed reviews, with critics praising its focus on Launda Naach artists and social commentary, but criticizing the predictable plot, uneven pacing, and excessive profanity. While Amar Ujala found the narrative stale and clichéd, The Times of India and Times Now both awarded 2.5/5 stars, noting that strong performances by Anshumaan Pushkar and RJ Mahvash were hindered by tedious storytelling and inconsistent momentum. Punjab Kesari acknowledged the show's success in highlighting marginalized cultural traditions but noted the overall execution was uneven.
