= Aithe Enti =

Aithe.. Enti.!
- DVD Cover
- Directed by: Soma Vijay Prakash; Habib Nasir (uncredited)
- Written by: Soma Vijay Prakash; Vamsi Mohan (dialogues)
- Produced by: Soma Vijay Prakash
- Starring: Namitha; Steven Kapoor; Mohit Chadda
- Cinematography: Amar Muttahar
- Edited by: Nandamuri Hari
- Music by: Ghantadi Krishna
- Production company: Vijay Suresh Productions
- Release date: 29 May 2004
- Country: India
- Language: Telugu

Aithe Enti (transl. So what?) is a 2004 Indian Telugu-language thriller film directed by Soma Vijay Prakash and starring Namitha, newcomer Steven Kapoor, and Mohit Chadda. The film was criticised for adding vulgar scenes to the forty-five minute screenplay.

== Plot ==
The film follows Sanjay, a man who dreams about a girl he never met named Anjali. When Sanjay finds out that Anjali is married to Veerendra Sharma, he gives a photograph to a professional killer (Malhotra) to kill Sharma. However, Sanjay accidentally gave a photograph of himself to the killer.

== Cast ==
- Namitha as Anjali
- Steven Kapoor as Veerendra "Veeru" Sharma
- Mohit Chadda as Sanjay
- Radhika Chaudhari
- Pavan Malhotra as a professional killer
- Brahmanandam
- M. S. Narayana
- Sudhakar
- Ali
- Raghu Babu
- Kallu Chidambaram
- Siva Reddy as the boss's son
- Duvvasi Mohan
- Ranganath as the boss
- Vizag Prasad
- Soma Vijay Prakash
- Telangana Shakuntala
- Karate Kalyani
- Madhulika
- Srinija

== Production ==
The film began production under the name The Deal and was initialled planned as a bilingual in Telugu and Hindi. Mumbai-based model Mohit was cast as one of the leads along with Namitha, whose real-life boyfriend, Steven Kapoor, played her husband in the film. Bollywood actress Shefali Jariwala was initially considered to do an item song in the film. The film was directed by Habib Nasir, who left the project midway along with Namitha and Kapoor due to script changes made by Soma Vijay Prakash (the film's producer) to suit the film's low budget. Soma Vijay Prakash took over direction and added a comedy track that involved himself as an actor.

== Soundtrack ==
Ghantadi Krishna composed the music. Lyrics by Jayasurya, R.D.S. Prakash and Sahiti. Audio released by Supreme Music.

- "Edo Kotta Lokam" – Ghantadi Krishna, Nitya Santhoshini
- "Muthyamaina"
- "Ninnu Choodani"- Smitha
- "Ninnu Choodani" (second version) – Parthasarathi, Nishma
- "Nuvve Naaku Lokamani" – Unnikrishnan
- "Rangeela" – Vijayalakshmi

== Release ==
The film received negative reviews for its vulgar scenes. Gudipoodi Srihari of The Hindu appreciated "The concept and presentation of the main theme is quite interesting", but criticised how "The criminal part of the main drama, towards the end, is the only saving grace of the film". Jeevi of Idlebrain.com noted that "This film takes the audience for a ride. You can safely avoid watching this flick". Mithun Verma of Full Hyderabad criticised the film and said that "Aithe Enti is a bad movie".
