= Ishita Sharma =

Indian actress

- Born: Mumbai, India
- Education: M.Sc (Human Development), Bachelor of Psychology & English Literature
- Occupations: Actor; Kathak dancer; Activist
- Years active: 2002–2015
- Spouse: Mohit Chadda (m. 2011)

Ishita Sharma is an Indian actress, kathak dancer, entrepreneur and social activist. She began her acting career with theatre and television while still in school, with children's shows like Shaka Laka Boom Boom, and later went on to make her big screen debut in the 2007 English film Loins of Punjab Presents. Alongside working in films like Dil Dosti Etc and Dulha Mil Gaya, Ishita continued her kathak performances as well as further studies in psychology and literature and acquired a Master's degree in human development.

She later moved to television as Anjalika Solanki (Anji) in the series Kuch Toh Log Kahenge and co-anchored Dance India Dance (season 4) with Jay Bhanushali.

Ishita used her creative experiences to establish Aamad, her school for performing arts in 2014, and in 2016 launched the MukkaMaar initiative to empower the lesser-privileged girls with free self-defence. MukkaMaar was then formally registered as a non-profit in 2018 and continues to work with thousands of girls in India.

== Filmography ==
Year	Film	Role	Language
2007	Loins of Punjab Presents	Preeti Patel	English
2007	Dil Dosti Etc	Kintu	Hindi
2008	Sakkarakatti	Deepali	Tamil
2010	Dulha Mil Gaya	Samarpreet Kapoor	Hindi
2010	Bird Idol		Hindi
2011	Cycle Kick	Suman	Hindi

=== Television ===
Year	Show	Role	Language	Ref
2002	Shri 420	Babli	Hindi	
2002	Kya Hadsaa Kya Haqeeqat	Deepthi	Hindi	
2004	Shaka Laka Boom Boom	Simple Didi	Hindi	
2005	Hello Dollie	Gauri Dholakia	Hindi	
2005	Happy Go Lucky	Manisha	Hindi	
2006	Ssshhhh...Phir Koi Hai	Unknown [Episode 8 - Pahadi Daayan]	Hindi	
2011–2013	Kuch Toh Log Kahenge	Anjali Solanki/Anji	Hindi	
2013	Dance India Dance (season 4)	Co-Host	Hindi	
2015	Darr Sabko Lagta Hai	Sakshi Verma in episode fifteen, paired with Arya Babbar	Hindi	
2026	Space Gen: Chandrayaan	Meenal	Hindi	
