= Emuthi Puthi =

Assamese film

Emuthi Puthi - A Fishy Trip
- Theatrical release poster
- Directed by: Kulanandini Mahanta
- Written by: Bhaskar Hazarika; Sunayana Dutta
- Produced by: Bhaskar Hazarika; Shyam Bora; Sunil Agarwal
- Starring: Kenny Basumatary; Pratibha Chaudhary; Srishti Sharma
- Release date: 17 June 2022
- Country: India
- Language: Assamese

Emuthi Puthi (Assamese: এমুঠি পুঠি) is an Assamese-language film directed by Kulanandini Mahanta which premiered on 17 June 2022. The film stars Neetali Das, Srishti Sharma and Pratibha Choudhury in leading roles. It received the Best Feature Film Award for Assamese language at the National Film Awards.

== Plot ==
The film centers on a teenage girl who sneaks out of her house at midnight to join her grandmother on a journey in search of a mysterious fish. Complicating matters, a police officer is pursuing them. This officer is the girl's mother and the grandmother's daughter. The story explores themes of family dynamics and personal discovery.

== Production ==
Emuthi Puthi is noted for being the first full-length Assamese film shot entirely on an iPhone. The screenplay was jointly written by Bhaskar Hazarika and Sunayana Dutta. It was produced by Bhaskar Hazarika, Shyam Bora, and Sunil Agarwal.

== Awards ==
Emuthi Puthi won the Best Feature Film Award for Assamese language at the National Film Awards.
