= Fouja =

Indian action drama film

- Directed by: Pramod Kumar Punhana
- Written by: Pravesh Rajput; Akash Singh
- Produced by: Ajit Dalmia
- Starring: Karthik Dammu; Pavan Malhotra; Aishwarya Sanjay Singh
- Release date: 1 June 2023
- Country: India
- Language: Hindi

Fouja is a 2023 Indian three national award winning film Hindi-language action drama film directed by Pramod Kumar Punhana and produced by Ajit Dalmia. The film stars Karthik Dammu, Pavan Malhotra, and Aishwarya Sanjay Singh in prominent roles. The movie tells a story set against the backdrop of the Indian Army and centers around themes of familial sacrifice, duty, and personal redemption. The screenplay was written by Pravesh Rajput and Akash Singh.

== Plot ==
Fouja revolves around the life of Karthik Dammu's character, a young man struggling to meet the expectations of his father, played by Pavan Malhotra, who hails from a family with a long history of military service. For seven generations, every male in the family has served and sacrificed for the country. However, due to a physical disability, the father himself could not join the army. This unfulfilled dream becomes a lifelong regret, and he places his hopes on his son.

The film contrasts the son's lack of discipline with the father's unwavering desire to see him join the army. As the son spends his time idly, the father eventually decides to join the army himself, only to be disappointed again. Meanwhile, the son realizes the importance of fulfilling his father's dream and begins to prepare for army recruitment. The story also touches on village politics, as a corrupt contractor targets the family's land.

== Cast ==
- Pavan Malhotra as Karthik's father
- Karthik Dammu
- Aishwarya Singh
- Jogi Mallang
- Hari Om Kaushik
- Naveen
- Janhvi Singh Sangwan
- Neeva Malik
- Sandeep Sharma
- Jogi Malang

== Reception ==
Fouja was praised for its story and performances, especially that of Pavan Malhotra. Subhash K Jha from Times Now remarked that Fouja is "commendable for its pitch for army recruitment more than its cinematic qualities," noting that Pavan Malhotra's performance overshadowed the rest of the cast, including Karthik Dammu. Amar Ujala also lauded Malhotra's performance, stating, "Actor Pawan Malhotra has carried the film 'Fauja' on his strong shoulders from start to finish."

== Awards ==
The film received critical acclaim and won three National Awards, including the Best Supporting Actor Award for Pavan Malhotra for his portrayal of the father, Best Debutant director Pramod Kumar Punhana, and Best Lyricist Naushad Sadar khan.
