= Satya Vyas =

Indian writer

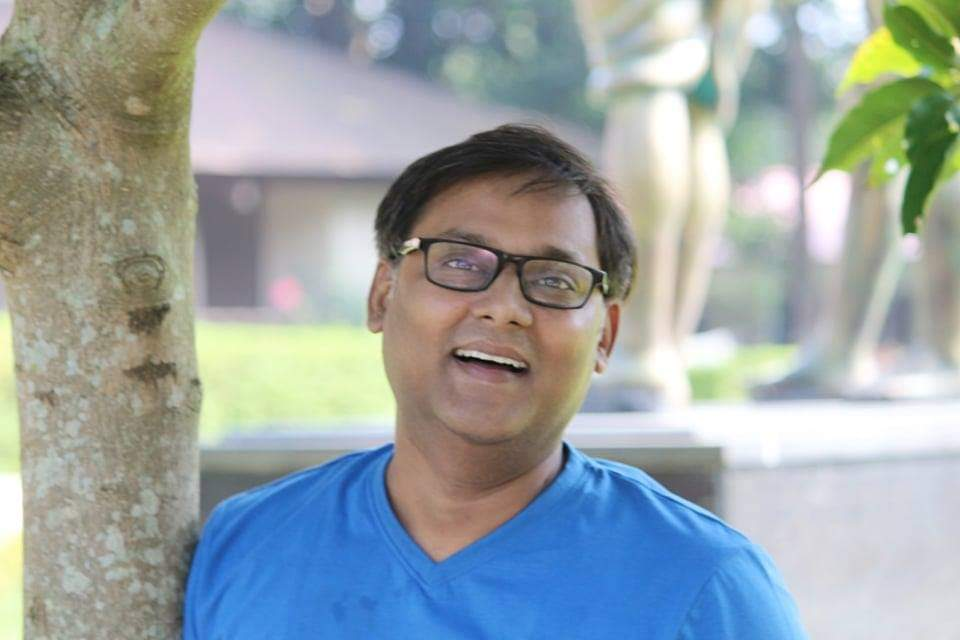
- Born: 1 January 1980 (age 46); Bokaro, Jharkhand, India
- Education: Law graduate from Banaras Hindu University
- Occupation: Public Servant
- Known for: Author of Banaras Talkies and Chaurasi
- Website: satyavyas.com

Satya Vyas (born 1 January 1980, Bokaro, Jharkhand) is an Indian writer of modern Hindi. He is a graduate in law from Banaras Hindu University. He is born and brought up in Bokaro Steel City and has authored 10 bestselling Hindi Novels.

== Writing career ==
Vyas' first book Banaras Talkies, was published in 2015, and an English language translation by Himadri Agarwal was published in 2022.

His other books are Dilli Darbar, Chaurasi / 84, Baghi Ballia, and Uff Kolkata.

Satya Vyas writes in a wide genre and with different backgrounds.

Satya Vyas has many followers among the youth.

His books have been translated in many languages.

Banaras Talkies has been translated in Assamese, Manipuri, and English.

Dilli Durbar has been translated in English by Westland publishers.

Chaurasi has also been translated in Urdu and Punjabi and has been adapted to a tele series on OTT called Grahan. Grahan's original network is Hotstar.

== Notable work ==
1. Banaras Talkies – 2015
2. Dilli Darbar – 2016
3. Chaurasi – 2018
4. Baaghi Ballia – 2019
5. Uff Kolkata – 2020
6. Shishir ki Girlfriend (Audio story)
7. Grahan (Webseries)
8. Kala Paisa (Audio Series)
9. Qaatil Kaun (Audio Series)
10. 1931 (Book)
