= Bigg Boss Non-Stop season 1 =

Indian reality digital show

Bigg Boss Non-Stop
- Season 1
- Bigg Boss Non-Stop Season 1 logo
- Presented by: Nagarjuna
- No. of days: 84
- No. of housemates: 18
- Winner: Bindu Madhavi
- Runner-up: Akhil Sarthak
- No. of episodes: 85

Release
- Original network: Disney+ Hotstar
- Original release: 26 February – 21 May 2022

Bigg Boss Non-Stop, is the first season of the Indian Telugu-language reality digital series of Bigg Boss Non-Stop and the first series to be released exclusively on Star India's streaming platform Disney+ Hotstar. The season premiered on 26 February 2022 with Nagarjuna as a host.

The season's finale took place on 21 May 2022 with Bindu Madhavi winning the title along with ₹40 lakh prize money while Akhil Sarthak emerged as the first runner-up.

== Production ==
=== Announcement ===
On 24 December 2021, In an official press interaction with media, the makers have announced Bigg Boss Telugu OTT will be set to be streamed soon and also said the digital version of the show is going to be different from its television counterpart. On 9 February 2022, Disney+ Hotstar revealed the show's title along with a new logo. The title and logo of 'Bigg Boss Non-Stop' were unveiled.

=== Teaser ===
The logo has a striking blend of blue and red with the Bigg Boss eye and the title in grey grabbing all the attention. The debut OTT version comes with the tagline 'Non-Stop entertainment'. On 15 February 2022, Host Nagarjuna has confirmed the same with a teaser featuring Vennela Kishore and Murali Sharma alongside him.

== Format ==
As like the televised series, the group of contestants referred to as Housemates are enclosed in the Bigg Boss House under constant surveillance of cameras and microphones.

== Theme ==
=== Warriors vs Challengers ===
The TV series has invited new contestants from film, TV, Radio, and social media fraternities every season. Bigg Boss Non-Stop will have a line up of both former Bigg Boss Telugu contestants dubbed as Warriors and celebrities who will make their Bigg Boss debut and are dubbed as Challengers.

The concept of Challengers Vs Warriors was ended on day 14 by Raj Tarun who came for Stand Up Rahul Movie Promotion

== Housemate status ==
Sr	Housemate	Previous season status	Day entered	Day exited	Status
1	Bindu	—	Day 1	Day 84	Winner
2	Akhil	1st runner-up	Day 1	Day 84	1st runner-up
3	Shiva	—	Day 1	Day 84	2nd runner-up
4	Ariyana	3rd runner-up	Day 1	Day 84	Walked, 3rd runner-up
5	Mithraaw	—	Day 1	Day 84	4th runner-up
6	Bhaskar	2nd runner-up	Day 49	Day 84	5th runner-up
7	Anil	—	Day 1	Day 84	6th runner-up
8	Nataraj	16th position	Day 1	Day 77	Evicted
9	Ashu	13th position	Day 1	Day 70	Evicted
10	Hamida	15th position	Day 1	Day 63	Evicted
11	Ajay	—	Day 1	Day 56	Evicted
12	Mahesh	8th position	Day 1	Day 49	Evicted
13	Sravanthi	—	Day 1	Day 42	Evicted
14	Mumaith	8th position	Day 1	Day 7	Evicted
14	Mumaith	8th position	Day 31	Day 42	Evicted
15	Tejaswi	15th position	Day 1	Day 35	Evicted
16	Sarayu	19th position	Day 1	Day 28	Evicted
17	Chaitu	—	Day 1	Day 21	Evicted
18	Shree	—	Day 1	Day 14	Evicted

== Housemates ==
=== Original entrants ===
==== Warriors ====
- Ashu reddy – Indian movie actress and dubsmasher, she is well known for her work in the Telugu film industry. She made her acting debut with the Telugu movie Chal Mohan Ranga. She was evicted on Day 35 in Bigg Boss (Telugu season 3).
- Mahesh Vitta – Indian actor, who has acted in Telugu films. He is best known for his performance in the internet comedy series Fun Bucket. He was evicted on Day 84 in Bigg Boss (Telugu season 3).
- Mumaith Khan – Indian actress and model. She has appeared in numerous item numbers in Telugu, Hindi, Tamil, Kannada, Bengali, and Odia language films. She was evicted on Day 49 in Bigg Boss (Telugu season 1).
- Ariyana Glory – TV presenter. She worked in well-known channels like Studio Network and Gemini TV. She became as third runner-up in Bigg Boss (Telugu season 4).
- Nataraj – Dance choreographer and television judge. He was part of the reality dance show Aata. He was evicted on Day 28 in Bigg Boss (Telugu season 5).
- Tejaswi Madivada – Indian actress and model. A dance tutor turned actress, she made her acting debut with Seethamma Vaakitlo Sirimalle Chettu and became noted after starring in Ice Cream. She was evicted on Day 42 in Bigg Boss (Telugu season 2).
- Hamida Khatoon – Film actress. She is known for the film Sahasam Cheyara Dimbaka. She was evicted on Day 35 in Bigg Boss (Telugu season 5).
- Sarayu Roy – YouTuber. She is a part of the 7 Arts YouTube channel. She was evicted on Day 7 in Bigg Boss (Telugu season 5).
- Akhil Sarthak – Television actor. He is best known for his role in the Kalyani serial. He is the "Hyderabad Times Most Desirable Man 2020-21" on Television. He became runner-up in Bigg Boss (Telugu season 4).

==== Challengers ====
- Ajay Kumar – Film actor and he well known for his films Mehbooba, and Vishwak.
- Sravanthi Chokarapu – Indian Film Actress, Anchor, and Model. She started her career in modeling. She then turned Anchor and worked for in Yoyo TV channel and also worked in the Filmy Focus and Jabardasth show.
- RJ Chaitu – Most popular Radio Jockeys of Hyderabad. He also hosted special events and shows.
- Shree Rapaka – Film Actress, model and costume designer. She made her acting debut with the film Nagnam in the year 2020. She was also a part of the popular dance reality TV show 'Rangasthalam'. She has hosted a few celebrity interviews and events as well.
- Anil Rathod is a Popular Fashion Model and actor. He appeared in many brands and international shows. He also won many awards like Mr. Telangana 2015, Best Model of the Year by TAA, and Best Model – Rubaru Mr. India 2021.
- Shiva – He was an anchor who mainly works in the Telugu Entertainment industry. He has worked in NTV News Channel and also worked in more than 7 Channels like Telugu Full Screen, Telugu Vikas, Daily Culture, News Qube Channel. He started his own YouTube Channel Mana Media.
- Mitraaw Sharma – Producer, Model, and actress, in the Telugu industry. She made her acting debut with Telugu Movie Boys (2021).
- Bindu Madhavi – Indian model and actress, working in Telugu and Tamil industry. She is known for the films Aavakai Biryani, Pilla Jamindar, Rama Rama Krishna Krishna, Kazhugu (2012 film), Kedi Billa Killadi Ranga. She also participated in Bigg Boss (Tamil season 1) and she emerged as the 4th runner up.

=== Wildcard entrant ===
Warrior

- Baba Bhaskar – Dance choreographer, director who works mainly in Tamil and Telugu language films. He also appears in Ishmart Jodi 2, Cook with Comali 2 as a contestant and television Judge in dance reality shows. He became second runner-up in Bigg Boss (Telugu season 3).

== Weekly summary ==
Week 1	Entrances	Ashu, Mahesh Vitta, Mumaith khan, Ajay Khaturvar, Sravanathi Chokkarapu, Rj Chaitu, Ariyana Glory, Natraj Master, Shree Rapaka, Anil Rathod, Mithraaw Sharma, Tejaswi Madivada, Sarayu Roy, Anchor Siva, Bindu Madhavi, Hamida Khatoon, and Akhil Sarthak entered the Bigg Boss house as Original Entrants.
Week 1	Nominations	Ariyana, Chaitu, Hamida, Mithraaw, Mumaith, Nataraj, and Sarayu were nominated for Week 1 eviction process.
Week 1	House Captain	None
Week 1	Saved contestants	Ariyana, Chaitu, Hamida, Mithraaw, Nataraj, and Sarayu were declared safe from Week 1 Eviction.
Week 1	Exits	Mumaith khan was evicted from the Bigg Boss House after facing the public vote.
Week 2	Nominations	Akhil, Anil, Ariyana, Ashu, Hamida, Mitraww, Shree, Mahesh, Mitraww, Natraj, Shiva, and Sarayu are nominated for Week 2 Nominations.
Week 2	House Captain	Tejaswi Madivadais was the House Captain of Week 2. Nataraj Master was the Ration Manager of Week 2.
Week 2	Saved Contestants	Akhil, Anil, Ariyana, Ashu, Hamida, Mahesh, Mithraaw, Nataraj, Sarayu, and Shiva were declared safe from Week 2 Eviction.
Week 2	Exits	Shree Rapaka was evicted from the Bigg Boss House after facing the public vote.
Week 3	Nominations	Ajay, Akhil, Ariyana, Bindu, Chaitu, Hamida, Mahesh, Mithraaw, Nataraj, Shiva, Sravanthi, and tejaswi are nominated for Week 3 Nominations.
Week 3	House Captain	Anil Rathod was the House Captain of Week 3. Ariyana Glory was the Ration Manager of Week 3.
Week 3	Saved Contestants	Ajay, Akhil, Ariyana, Bindu, Hamida, Mahesh, Mithraaw, Nataraj, Shiva, Sravanthi, and tejaswi were declared safe from Week 3 Eviction.
Week 3	Exits	Rj Chaitu was evicted from the Bigg Boss House after facing the public vote.
Week 4	Nominations	Ajay, Anil, Ariyana, Bindu, Mithraaw, Sarayu, and Shiva are nominated for Week 4 Nominations.
Week 4	House Captain	Anil Rathod was the House Captain of Week 4. Hamida Khatoon was the Ration Manager of Week 4.
Week 4	Saved contestants	Ajay, Anil, Ariyana, Bindu, Mithraaw, and Shiva were declared safe from Week 4 Eviction.
Week 4	Exits	Sarayu Roy was evicted from the Bigg Boss House after facing the public vote.
Week 5
Week 5	Nominations	Anil, Ariyana, Ashu, Bindu, Mithraaw, Shiva, Sravanthi, and Tejaswi are nominated for Week 5 Nominations.
Week 5	House Captain	Nataraj Master was the House Captain of Week 5. Bindu Madhavi was the Ration Manager of Week 5.
Week 5	Saved contestants	Anil, Ariyana, Ashu, Bindu, Mithraaw, Shiva, and Sravanthi were declared safe from Week 5 Eviction.
Week 5	Exits	Tejaswi Madivadais was evicted from the Bigg Boss House after facing the public vote.
Week 6	Nominations	Ajay, Ashu, Bindu, Hamida, Mahesh, Mithraaw, Mumaith, Nataraj, Shiva, and Sravanthi are nominated for Week 5 Nominations.
Week 6	House Captain	Akhil Sarthak was the House Captain of Week 6. Hamida Khatoon was the Ration Manager of Week 6.
Week 6	Saved contestants	Ajay, Ashu, Bindu, Hamida, Mahesh, Mithraaw, Nataraj, and Shiva were declared safe from Week 6 Eviction.
Week 6	Exits	Mumaith khan was evicted from the Bigg Boss House after facing the public vote. Sravanathi Chokkarapu was evicted from the Bigg Boss House after facing the public vote.
Week 7	Nominations	Akhil, Anil, Ariyana, Bindu, Mahesh, Mithraaw, Nataraj, and Shiva are nominated for Week 7 Nominations.
Week 7	House Captain	Ashu was the House Captain of Week 7. Ariyana Glory was the Ration Manager of Week 7.
Week 7	Saved contestants	Akhil, Anil, Ariyana, Bindu, Mithraaw, Nataraj, and Shiva were declared safe from Week 7 Eviction.
Week 7	Exits	Mahesh Vitta was evicted from the Bigg Boss House after facing the public vote.
Week 8	Entrances	Baba Bhaskar entered the Secret room as Wildcard.
Week 8	Nominations	Akhil, Ajay, Anil, Ashu, and Hamida are nominated for Week 8 Nominations.
Week 8	House Captain	Anchor Shiva was the House Captain of Week 8. Hamida Khatoon was the Ration Manager of Week 8.
Week 8	Saved contestants	Akhil, Anil, Ashu, and Hamida were declared safe from Week 8 Eviction.
Week 8	Exits	Ajay Kumar was evicted from the Bigg Boss House after facing the public vote.
Week 9	Entrances	Ashu Mother, Anchor Shiva Sister, Nataraj Master Wife and Daughter; Ariyana Glory Friend, Akhil Sarthak Mother, Mithraaw Sharma Friend; Hamida Khatoon Brother, Anil Rathod Sister, and Bindu Madhavi Father entered house as guest.
Week 9	Nominations	Anil, Ariyana, Bhaskar, Hamida, Mithraaw, Nataraj, and Shiva are nominated for Week 9 Nominations.
Week 9	House Captain	Akhil Sarthak was the House Captain of Week 9. Baba Bhaskar was the Ration Manager of Week 9.
Week 9	Saved contestants	Anil, Ariyana, Bhaskar, Mithraaw, Nataraj, and Shiva were declared safe from Week 9 Eviction.
Week 9	Exits	Hamida Khatoon was evicted from the Bigg Boss House after facing the public vote.
Week 10	Entrances	Siri Hanmanth, Maanas Nagulapalli, Ravi Kiran, Shanmukh Jaswanth, and VJ Sunny entered the Bigg Boss as guests to conduct the Eviction Free Pass contender Task.
Week 10	Nominations	Akhil, Anil, Ariyana, Ashu, Bindu, Mithraaw, and Shiva are nominated for Week 10 Nominations.
Week 10	House Captain	Baba Bhaskar was the House Captain of Week 10. Baba Bhaskar was the Ration Manager of Week 10.
Week 10	Saved contestants	Akhil, Anil, Ariyana, Bindu, Mithraaw, and Shiva were declared safe from Week 10 Eviction.
Week 10	Exits	Ashu was evicted from the Bigg Boss House after facing the public vote.
Week 11	Nominations	Anil, Akhil, Ariyana, Bindu, Bhaskar, Mithraaw, Natraj, Shiva are nominated for Week 11 Nominations
Week 11	House Captain	None
Week 11	Saved contestants	Anil, Akhil, Ariyana, Bindu, Bhaskar, Mithraaw, Shiva were declared safe from Week 11 Eviction.
Week 11	Exits	Natraj Master was evicted from the Bigg Boss House after facing the public vote.
Week 12	Nominations	Anil, Akhil, Ariyana, Bindu, Bhaskar, Mithraaw, Shiva are nominated for Week 12 Nominations
Week 12	House Captain	None
Week 12	Finalist	Anil, Akhil, Ariyana, Bindu, Bhaskar, Mithraaw, Shiva are the finalist of Bigg Boss Non-Stop season 1.
Week 12	Exits	None
Week 12	6th runner-up	On Day 84, Anil Rathod was declared as 6th Runner up after facing public vote for Bigg Boss Non-stop Season 1
Week 12	5th runner-up	On Day 84, Baba Bhaskar was declared as 5th Runner up after facing public vote for Bigg Boss Non-stop Season 1
Week 12	4th runner-up	On Day 84, Mithraaw Sharma was declared as 4th Runner up after facing public vote for Bigg Boss Non-stop Season 1
Week 12	3rd runner-up	On Day 84, Ariyana Glory accepts 10 lakhs rupees and walked out of the house and declared as 3rd Runner up for Bigg Boss Non-stop Season 1
Week 12	2nd runner-up	On Day 84, Shiva was declared as 2nd Runner up after facing public vote for Bigg Boss Non- stop Season 1
Week 12	1st runner-up	On Day 84, Akhil Sarthak declared as 1st Runner after facing public vote for Bigg Boss Non-stop Season 1
Week 12	Winner	On Day 84, Bindu Madhavi declared as winner after facing public vote for Bigg Boss Non -stop Season 1

== Nomination table ==
	Week 1	Week 2	Week 3	Week 4	Week 5		Week 6	Week 7	Week 8	Week 9	Week 10	Week 11	Week 12			
	Week 1	Week 2	Week 3	Week 4	Day 29	Day 30	Week 6	Week 7	Week 8	Week 9	Week 10	Week 11	Week 12			
Nominees For Captaincy	No; Captain	Akhil; Ariyana; Mahesh; Nataraj; Sarayu; Tejaswi	Anil; Ariyana; Chaitu; Hamida; Shiva; Shree	Ajay; Anil; Ariyana; Ashu; Chaitu; Hamida; Shiva	Ajay; Anil; Ashu; Mahesh; Nataraj; Sarayu; Shiva; Tejaswi		Akhil; Ajay; Ashu; Bindu; Mumaith; Shiva; Sravanthi	Ashu; Hamida; Mumaith; Shiva	Mahesh; Shiva; Mithraaw; Anil; Nataraj	Akhil; Anil; Bhaskar; Mithraaw; Shiva	Ashu; Bhaskar; Bindu; Mithraaw; Nataraj	No; Captain				
House Captain	No; Captain	Tejaswi	Anil	Chaitu	Nataraj		Akhil	Ashu	Shiva	Akhil	Bhaskar	No; Captain				
House Captain	No; Captain	Tejaswi	Anil	Anil	Nataraj		Akhil	Ashu	Shiva	Akhil	Bhaskar	No; Captain				
Captain's Nomination	No; Captain	Anil	Mahesh; Mithraaw	Not eligible	Tejaswi; Sravanthi	Not eligible	Bindu; Mithraaw	Mahesh	Ashu; Akhil	Shiva; Hamida	Shiva; Ashu	No; Captain				
Ration Manager	No; Manager	Nataraj	Ariyana	Hamida	Bindu		Hamida	Ariyana	Hamida	Bhaskar		No; Manager				
Vote to:	Evict			Task/Evict	Evict	Task	Evict	Task/Evict	Evict				WIN			
Bindu	Akhil; Mumaith	Nataraj; Sarayu	Tejaswi; Akhil	Nominated	Ariyana; Ashu	Swapped with Tejaswi (1st) & Mahesh (2nd)	Nataraj; Ashu	Akhil; Bindu	Akhil; Ajay	Shiva; Mithraaw	Mithraaw; Shiva	Mithraaw; Akhil; Nataraj	Nominated	Winner (Day 84)		
Akhil	Not eligible	Shiva	Shiva; Chaitu	Saved	Mahesh; Mithraaw	Saved	House; Captain	Akhil; Bindu	Ariyana; Bindu	House; Captain	Shiva; Ariyana	Bindu; Anil; Shiva	Nominated	1st runner-up (Day 84)		
Shiva	Sarayu; Mumaith	Sarayu; Akhil	Nataraj; Akhil	Nominated	Mithraaw; Ajay	Nominated	Mithraaw; Mahesh	Nataraj; Shiva	House; Captain	Nataraj; Mithraaw	Ashu; Akhil	Nataraj; Mithraaw; Akhil	Nominated	2nd runner-up (Day 84)		
Ariyana	Not eligible	Shree	Tejaswi; Mithraaw	Sarayu; Hamida	Mahesh; Anil	Nominated	Mithraaw; Bindu	Ariyana	Ashu; Akhil	Nataraj; Hamida	Shiva; Mithraaw	Mithraaw; Anil; Nataraj	Nominated	Walked, 3rd runner-up (Day 84)		
Mithraaw	Ariyana; Nataraj	Ashu; Hamida	Shiva; Chaitu	Nominated	Mahesh; Shiva	Nominated	Mahesh; Shiva	Mithraaw	Ashu; Bindu	Shiva; Bindu	Ariyana; Bindu	Shiva; Ariyana; Bhaskar	Nominated	4th runner-up (Day 84)		
Bhaskar	Not In House								Bindu (To save)	Anil; Mithraaw	House; Captain	Anil; Nataraj; Mithraaw	Nominated	5th runner-up (Day 84)		
Anil	Nataraj; Sarayu	Sarayu; Hamida	House; Captain		Mithraaw; Ariyana	Nominated	Nataraj; Mithraaw	Anil	Nataraj; Ajay	Nataraj; Bhaskar	Ariyana; Ashu	Akhil; Bhaskar; Ariyana	Nominated	6th runner-up (Day 84)		
Nataraj	Not eligible	Shiva	Shiva; Bindu	Shiva; Bindu; Mithraaw; Anil	House; Captain		Sravanthi; Bindu	Nataraj; Shiva	Anil; Hamida	Anil; Ariyana	Shiva; Anil	Bindu; Ariyana; Bhaskar	Evicted (Day 77)			
Ashu	Not eligible	Mithraaw	Mahesh; Mithraaw	Saved	Mahesh; Bindu	Swapped with Sravanthi	Mithraaw; Hamida	House; Captain	Mithraaw; Hamida	Shiva; Bhaskar	Shiva; Ariyana	Evicted (Day 70)				
Hamida	Not eligible	Mithraaw	Ajay; Sravanthi	Saved	Ashu; Ariyana	Saved	Ashu; Ajay	Anil	Ajay; Ashu	Ariyana; Nataraj	Evicted (Day 63)					
Ajay	Sarayu; Nataraj	Sarayu; Mahesh	Hamida; Mahesh	Nominated	Ariyana; Shiva	Saved	Mahesh; Hamida	Ariyana	Anil; Hamida	Evicted (Day 56)						
Mahesh	Not eligible	Anil	Ajay; Nataraj	Ashu; Ariyana; Akhil; Ajay; Shiva; Tejaswi	Mithraaw; Ashu	Swapped with Bindu	Mumaith; Mithraaw	Mithraaw	Evicted (Day 49)							
Sravanthi	Nataraj; Hamida	Sarayu; Nataraj	Hamida; Mithraaw	Saved	Anil; Mahesh	Swapped with Ashu	Mithraaw; Nataraj	Evicted (Day 42)								
Mumaith	Not eligible	Evicted (Day 7)			Exempt		Mahesh; Mithraaw	Evicted (Day 42)								
Tejaswi	Not eligible	House; Captain	Ariyana; Chaitu	Saved	Ariyana; Bindu	Swapped with Bindu	Evicted (Day 35)									
Sarayu	Not eligible	Shiva	Sravanthi; Ajay	Nominated	Evicted (Day 28)											
Chaitu	Hamida; Nataraj	Akhil; Ariyana	Tejaswi; Mithraaw	Evicted (Day 21)												
Shree	Ariyana; Nataraj	Ariyana; Sarayu	Evicted (Day 14)													
Notes	1, 2	3	None	4, 5	6		None		7	8	None	9	10, 11, 12, 13			
Against Public Vote	Ariyana; Chaitu; Hamida; Mithraaw; Mumaith; Nataraj; Sarayu	Akhil; Anil; Ariyana; Ashu; Hamida; Mahesh; Mithraaw; Nataraj; Sarayu; Shiva; Shree	Ajay; Akhil; Ariyana; Bindu; Chaitu; Hamida; Mahesh; Mithraaw; Nataraj; Shiva; Sravanthi; Tejaswi	Ajay; Anil; Ariyana; Bindu; Mithraaw; Sarayu; Shiva	Anil; Ariyana; ~~Ashu~~; Bindu; ~~Mahesh~~; Mithraaw; Shiva; Sravanthi; Tejaswi		Ajay; Ashu; Bindu; Hamida; Mahesh; Mithraaw; Mumaith; Nataraj; Shiva; Sravanthi	Akhil; Anil; Ariyana; Bindu; Mahesh; Mithraaw; Nataraj; Shiva	Ajay; Akhil; Anil; Ashu; ~~Bindu~~; Hamida	Anil; Ariyana; Bhaskar; Hamida; Mithraaw; Nataraj; Shiva	Akhil; Anil; Ariyana; Ashu; Bindu; Mithraaw; Shiva	Akhil; Anil; Ariyana; Bhaskar; Bindu; Mithraaw; Nataraj; Shiva	Akhil; Anil; Ariyana; Bhaskar; Bindu; Mithraaw; Shiva			
Best Performer	Mahesh	Nataraj	Mithraaw	None	Hamida		Ariyana	Mithraaw	Hamida	None						
Worst Performer	Nataraj	Mahesh	Shiva	None	Mithraaw		Bindu	Ashu	Mithraaw	None						
Secret Room	None				None		None		Bhaskar	None						
Re-Entered	None				Mumaith		None		None	None						
Evicted	Mumaith	Shree	Chaitu	Sarayu	Tejaswi		Mumaith	Mahesh	Ajay	Hamida	Ashu	Nataraj	Anil	Mithraaw	Shiva	Bindu
Evicted	Mumaith	Shree	Chaitu	Sarayu	Tejaswi		Sravanthi	Mahesh	Ajay	Hamida	Ashu	Nataraj	Bhaskar	Ariyana	Akhil	Bindu

=== Notes ===
indicates the contestant is Warrior
indicates the contestant is Challenger
indicates the Nominees for house captaincy.
indicates the House Captain.
indicates the former House Captain. (House Captain would have been stripped off the captaincy i.e., evicted/ejected/walked out after being nominated as the Captain)
indicates that the Housemate was directly nominated for eviction prior to the regular nominations process.
indicates that the Housemate was granted immunity from nominations.
indicates the winner.
indicates the first runner up.
indicates the second runner up.
indicates the third runner up.
indicates the fourth runner up.
indicates the fifth runner up.
indicates the sixth runner up.
indicates the contestant as Best Performer of the week.
indicates the contestant as Worst Performer of the week.
indicates that the housemate went to secret room.
indicates the contestant has re-entered the house.
indicates the contestant has walked out of the show.
indicates the contestant has been evicted.

- ^Note 1 : All the Challengers had to nominate two Warriors by representing them with a hashtag.
- ^Note 2 : All the Warriors had to select any two of the challengers to get directly nominated with a majority of decision. As a result, Chaitu and Mitraaw were nominated.
- ^Note 3 : All the Warriors had to nominate only one Challenger and all Challengers had to nominate two Warriors.
- ^Note 4 : Chaitu was stripped off the captaincy after he was evicted on Day 21. He choose Anil to take up Captain duties but didn't receive immunity.
- ^Note 5 : Week 5's nominations were part of a task.
- ^Note 6 : On day 30, Bigg Boss gave an Immunity Task. In each round Ashu, Bindu and Mahesh won the task saved themselves from nominations and they were replaced by save housemates' decision. They chose Sravanthi, Tejaswi and Bindu respectively.
- ^Note 7 : In Week 7's nominations part, Bigg Boss paired-up the housemates and asked them to mutually decide to nominate one and save one.
- ^Note 8 : While the other housemates nominated Bindu, Bhaskar saved her after the nominations.
- ^Note 9 : For this week, housemates had to choose three housemates not deserving to be in Top 5. But all housemates were nominated by Bigg Boss.
- ^Note 10 : On Day 77, Akhil, Anil, Ariyana, Bhaskar, Bindu, Mithraaw and Shiva announced as Top 7 finalists.
- ^Note 11 : On Day 84, Anil become as 6th runner-up, Bhaskar became as 5th runner-up and Mithraaw become as 4th runner-up.
- ^Note 12 : On Day 84, Ariyana accepted 10 lakh rupees from prize money then she walked out of the house and become as 3rd runner-up while Shiva became as 2nd runner-up.
- ^Note 13 : On Day 84, Bindu won the title and Akhil become as 1st runner-up.

== Guest appearance ==
Week(s)	Day(s)	Guest(s)	Purpose of Visits
Week 2	Day 13	Raj Tarun and Varsha Bollamma	To promote their film Stand Up Rahul
Week 3	Day 20	Ohmkar	To interact with housemates
Week 4	Day 27	Siddhu Jonnalagadda and Neha Shetty	To celebrate success of their film DJ Tillu
Week 5	Day 34	Suma Kanakala	To promote her film Jayamma Panchayathi
Week 9	Day 60	Yamuna (Shiva's Sister)	Entered the house as a part of "BB Campus" Luxury Budget Task guest.
Week 9	Day 60	Yashoda (Ashu's Mother)	Entered the house as a part of "BB Campus" Luxury Budget Task guest.
Week 9	Day 60	Neetu and Lakshya (Nataraj's Wife and Daughter)	Entered the house as a part of "BB Campus" Luxury Budget Task guest.
Week 9	Day 61	Ravi Teja (Ariyana's Friend)	Entered the house as a part of "BB Campus" Luxury Budget Task guest.
Week 9	Day 61	Durga (Akhil's Mother)	Entered the house as a part of "BB Campus" Luxury Budget Task guest.
Week 9	Day 61	Bala Chandra (Mithraaw's Friend)	Entered the house as a part of "BB Campus" Luxury Budget Task guest.
Week 9	Day 62	Meharaj (Hamida's Brother)	Entered the house as a part of "BB Campus" Luxury Budget Task guest.
Week 9	Day 62	Swathi (Anil's Sister)	Entered the house as a part of "BB Campus" Luxury Budget Task guest.
Week 9	Day 62	Bhasker (Bindu's Father)	Entered the house as a part of "BB Campus" Luxury Budget Task guest.
Week 9	Day 63	Gangadhar (Mithraaw's Brother) and Siri Hanmanth from Bigg Boss 5 (Mithraaw's Friend)	To support the top 10 housemates and to predict the top 5 Finalists of the season.
Week 9	Day 63	Ramulu and Abhimanika (Anil's Father and Friend)	To support the top 10 housemates and to predict the top 5 Finalists of the season.
Week 9	Day 63	Abhi and Syed Sohel from Bigg Boss 4 (Akhil's Friends)	To support the top 10 housemates and to predict the top 5 Finalists of the season.
Week 9	Day 63	Muggu and Devi Nagavalli from Bigg Boss 4 (Ariyana's Friends)	To support the top 10 housemates and to predict the top 5 Finalists of the season.
Week 9	Day 63	Hamida's Mother and Anee from Bigg Boss 5 (Hamida's Friend)	To support the top 10 housemates and to predict the top 5 Finalists of the season.
Week 9	Day 63	Danush and Shanmukh Jaswanth from Bigg Boss 5 (Shiva's Friends)	To support the top 10 housemates and to predict the top 5 Finalists of the season.
Week 9	Day 63	Bhanu and Rahul Sipligunj from Bigg Boss 3 (Ashu's Friends)	To support the top 10 housemates and to predict the top 5 Finalists of the season.
Week 9	Day 63	Revathi (Baba Bhaskar's Wife)	To support the top 10 housemates and to predict the top 5 Finalists of the season.
Week 9	Day 63	Varalaxmi (Nataraj's Mother) and Priyanka Singh from Bigg Boss 5 (Nataraj's Friend)	To support the top 10 housemates and to predict the top 5 Finalists of the season.
Week 9	Day 63	Nirmala (Bindu's Mother) and Varalaxmi Sarathkumar (Bindu's Friend)	To support the top 10 housemates and to predict the top 5 Finalists of the season.
Week 9	Day 63	Meraj (Hamida's Brother)	To take Hamida from the House as she was Evicted.
Week 10	Day 65	Siri Hanmanth from Bigg Boss 5	To conduct Eviction Free Pass contender Task.
Week 10	Day 66	Maanas Nagulapalli from Bigg Boss 5	To conduct Eviction Free Pass contender Task.
Week 10	Day 67	Ravi Kiran from Bigg Boss 5	To conduct Eviction Free Pass contender Task.
Week 10	Day 68	Shanmukh Jaswanth from Bigg Boss 5	To conduct Eviction Free Pass contender Task.
Week 10	Day 69	Sunny from Bigg Boss 5 - Winner	To conduct Final Round of Eviction Free Pass Task.
Week 11	Day 73	Vishwak Sen, Ritika Naik and Rukshar Dhillon	To promote their film Ashoka Vanamlo Arjuna Kalyanam
Week 11	Day 74	Rajasekhar, Jeevitha and Anup Rubens	To promote their film Sekhar
Week 11	Day 75	Anasuya Bharadwaj	To promote her show Super Singer Juniors
Week 11	Day 76	Taraka Ratna, Madhu Shalini and Ravi Varma	To promote their web series 9 Hours
Week 12	Grand Finale	Satyadev	To promote his movie Godse and to escort Baba Bhaskar (5th runner up)
Week 12	Grand Finale	Daksha Nagarkar and Apsara Rani	Special Appearance
Week 12	Grand Finale	Adivi Sesh, Saiee Manjrekar and Sobhita Dhulipala	To promote their film Major
Week 12	Grand Finale	Anil Ravipudi, Sunil and Mehreen Pirzada	To promote their film F3 and offered silver briefcase filled with cash.
Week 12	Grand Finale	Nagarjuna	To offer golden briefcase filled with cash.
