= ATM (TV series) =

Indian Telugu-language web-series

- ATM Poster
- Genre: Crime; Heist; Thriller
- Written by: Harish Shankar
- Directed by: C. Chandra Mohan
- Presented by: Shirish
- Starring: Subbaraju; VJ Sunny; Krishna Burugula
- Music by: Prashanth R Vihari
- Country of origin: India
- Original language: Telugu

Production
- Producers: Harshith Reddy; Hanshitha Reddy
- Cinematography: Monic Kumar G
- Production company: Dil Raju Productions

Original release
- Network: ZEE5
- Release: 20 January 2023

ATM is an Indian Telugu-language heist thriller streaming television series set in Hyderabad, starring Subbaraju, VJ Sunny, Krishna Burugula, Ravi Raj, Roiel Shree, Divi Vadthya, Divya Vani, and Prudhvi Raj. It was directed by debutant C. Chandra Mohan, from a story penned by Harish Shankar, and produced by Harshith and Hanshitha Reddy, under Dil Raju Productions, a subsidiary wing of Sri Venkateswara Creations.

The music was scored by Prashanth R Vihari, cinematography by Monic Kumar G, and dialogues written by Vijay Muthyam and CP Emmanuel. The series follows four youngsters from the slums of Hyderabad, who rob for their livelihood. They get trapped in a high-profile case and are named the most-wanted accused. It was streamed on ZEE5 from 20 January 2023.

== Plot ==
Jagan, Karthik, Abhay and Harsha are four streetsmart youngsters who live in the slums of Hyderabad and are often involved in petty thefts to earn their bread and live a happy life. One day fate forces the four of them to attempt that one big robbery that changes their life and fate forever and in this attempt their paths cross with a strict and ruthless cop called Hegde and a political leader named Gajendra, both of them eyeing their loot. How do the four guys save themselves and how do they escape from the hunt of Hegde forms the story of ATM.

== Cast ==
- Subbaraju as Hegde
- VJ Sunny as Jagan
- Krishna Burugula as Karthik
- Divi Vadthya as Ramya Nayak
- Prudhvi Raj as Gajendra
- Ravi Raj as Abhay
- Roiel Shree as Harsha
- Divya Vani as CI Uma Devi
- Shafi as Mentor
- Dayanand Reddy as Jagan's father

== Release ==
In early 2022, ZEE5 announced a slate of Telugu series and films, with ATM being one of them, scheduled for a release on 20 January 2023.

The teaser of the series was released on 8 January 2023.

The makers unveiled the first look teaser through social media platforms on 16 August 2022 and an official trailer on 11 January 2023 which shows that "Jagan leads a dangerous lifestyle. He makes a living stealing money from other people, alongside his three underdog travelling companions. Whatever the reason, their propensity for shortcuts eventually puts them in danger."
