= Ammamma.com =

Telugu television series (2007–2008)

- Genre: Drama
- Created by: Gunnam Gangaraju
- Screenplay by: Palagummi Seeta
- Story by: Palagummi Seeta
- Directed by: Narendra Varma Mantena
- Starring: Jayalalitha; Arun Kumar; Ravi Kiran; Sridhar; Sivannarayana Naripeddi; Ragini
- Theme music composer: S. K. Balachandran
- Opening theme: "Ye Daaramo" sung by M. M. Keeravani
- Country of origin: India
- Original language: Telugu
- No. of episodes: 200+

Production
- Producer: Sandeep Gunnam
- Cinematography: Sakhamuri Ramu
- Editor: Sandeep K.
- Running time: 22 minutes
- Production company: Scorpio Productions

Original release
- Network: Maa TV
- Release: 2007 – 2008

Ammamma.com is an Indian Telugu-language drama television series that aired on Maa TV from 2007 to 2008. The series was written by Palagummi Seeta and produced by Sandeep Gunnam. It follows the story of a traditional middle-aged housewife who, with the help of her daughter-in-law, learns to use a computer and creates a website to share her experiences and advice. The series explores themes of women’s empowerment, technological adoption, and the generational gap in adapting to modern technology.

The cast includes Jayalalita in the title role, supported by Arun Kumar, Ravi Kiran, Sridhar, Sivannarayana Naripeddi, Ragini, and Bhargavi. The series received critical acclaim for its premise, its portrayal of family dynamics, and its exploration of social and technological issues. The title song, sung by M. M. Keeravani, was appreciated. The serial won five Nandi Awards in 2007, including the award for Second Best Daily TV Serial.

== Plot ==
The serial follows the story of a middle-aged housewife, who is traditional, composed, and devoted to her family. She respects her husband, Venkat Rao, and deeply cares for her children. By necessity, she learns to use a computer and gradually becomes adept at navigating the internet. Initially, she uses her knowledge to offer advice to her pregnant daughter living in the United States. Over time, her common sense and life experience enable her to assist her friends with their problems.

Encouraged by her growing reputation, her daughter-in-law creates a website named "Ammamma.com" in her honour. The website becomes a platform for Telugu-speaking individuals worldwide to seek her advice on various personal and social issues. Her thoughtful suggestions and practical solutions earn her widespread recognition, turning her into a celebrated figure within the community.

However, Venkat Rao struggles to accept his wife's newfound fame, and his ego is hurt when he discovers the existence of the website. Unable to cope with her celebrity status, tensions arise in their relationship. Meanwhile, she is invited by a prominent Telugu association in the United States to attend a felicitation ceremony in her honour. Her departure leads Venkat Rao to introspect and reassess his feelings. How the couple resolves their differences and reconciles forms the rest of the story.

== Cast ==
- Jayalalita
- Arun Kumar
- Ravi Kiran
- Sridhar
- Ragini as Lucky
- Sivannarayana Naripeddi as Lucky's husband
- Meka Ramakrishna
- Aasa Latha
- Bhargavi as Nandu
- Sirisha
- Avinash
- Naga Ravi Shankar

== Production ==
The story and screenplay of Ammamma.com were written by Palagummi Seetha, the daughter of noted writer Palagummi Padmaraju. The series was directed by Varma and produced by Sandeep Gunnam under Scorpio Productions. The dialogues for the series were written by Srinivas Chowdary Kilari and Pranamithra.

Sandeep Gunnam, along with his father Gangaraju Gunnam, was also involved in other Telugu serials, including the popular series Amrutham, which was produced under the Just Yellow banner.

== Themes ==
Ammamma.com centers on the life of a middle-aged housewife who, with the help of her daughter-in-law, learns to use a computer and creates a website to share her experiences and life tips. The series explores the impact of technology on daily life and addresses the generational gap in adapting to technological advancements.

Set in 2007, when the internet was becoming increasingly integrated into everyday life, the show depicts a middle-class family. The housewife’s journey into technology contrasts with her husband's resistance to change. Representing a traditional middle-class mindset, the husband believes that technology makes people lazy, while the wife adapts to this shift. This dynamic reflects the broader societal divide between those who embrace technological progress and those who remain sceptical.

The series also touches on sensitive issues, including the emotional and social challenges faced by a person unknowingly infected with AIDS and the complexities of second marriages. These topics are handled with sensitivity, showcasing the housewife’s ability to address them within her family.

A lighter, more humorous element is introduced through the character of Ragini, a housewife who dreams of moving to the US. The show also became notable for one of the first uses of the term "Bro" in a Telugu serial, which later gained popularity.

== Music ==
The title song of Ammamma.com was composed by S. K. Balachandran, with lyrics written by Sirivennela Seetarama Sastry and sung by M. M. Keeravani. Balachandran's composition earned him the Nandi Award for Best Music Director.

The song reflects the theme of the show, emphasizing the value of wisdom and experiences passed down through generations, particularly from grandmothers. The title song also became popular and contributed to the show's success.

Ammamma.com (Original Soundtrack)
No.	Title	Lyrics	Music	Singer(s)	Length
1.	"Ye Daaramo"	Sirivennela Seetarama Sastry	S. K. Balachandran	M. M. Keeravani	3:37

== Release ==
Ammamma.com originally aired on Maa TV, starting on 25 June 2007, and ran for over 200 episodes.

== Reception ==
Ammamma.com was praised for its premise, which depicted a woman using technology to drive social change, and for its realistic portrayal of family dynamics, empowerment, and progress. The series is remembered for its innovative concept and inspired other shows focused on women's empowerment and technology.

Bhargavi, who played a key role in the series, gained recognition and later appeared in the film Ashta Chamma (2008). Naga Ravi Shankar also gained fame through the serial and became an established actor in Telugu television.

== Awards ==
Awards and nominations received by Amrutham
Award	Year	Category	Recipient	Result	Ref.
Nandi TV Awards	2007	Second Best TV Daily Serial	Sandeep Gunnam Narendra Varma Mantena	Won	
Nandi TV Awards	2007	Best Comedian Actor	Sivannarayana Naripeddi	Won	
Nandi TV Awards	2007	Best Comedian Actress	Ragini	Won	
Nandi TV Awards	2007	Best Music Director	K. Balachandran	Won	
Nandi TV Awards	2007	Best Male Dubbing Artiste	K. S. Kumar	Won	
