= Bigg Boss Non-Stop =

Indian Telugu-language digital reality series

- Show's first season logo with host Nagarjuna
- Presented by: Nagarjuna
- Country of origin: India
- Original language: Telugu
- No. of seasons: 1

Production
- Production location: Hyderabad
- Camera setup: Multi-camera
- Running time: 24 hours (Live); 1hr episode
- Production company: Banijay

Original release
- Network: Disney+ Hotstar
- Release: 26 February 2022

Related
- Bigg Boss (Telugu TV series)

Bigg Boss: Non-Stop is a spin-off Indian Telugu-language reality digital series of the show Bigg Boss, that airs exclusively on Disney Star's streaming service platform Disney+ Hotstar with host Nagarjuna. The first season of the show premiered on 26 February 2022.

On 24 December 2021, in an official press interaction with media, the makers announced Bigg Boss Telugu OTT will be set to be streamed soon and also said the digital version of the show is going to be different from its television counterpart. On 9 February 2022, Disney+ Hotstar revealed the show's title along with a new logo.

== Concept ==
As in the televised series, the group of contestants—referred to as Housemates—are enclosed in the Bigg Boss Non-Stop House under constant surveillance of cameras and microphones. Unlike the main edition, this spin-off will be airing 24/7 live streaming and a one-hour main coverage episode will be daily telecast on Disney+ Hotstar.

== Development ==
The spin-off edition was officially announced by the host Nagarjuna in the grand finale of Bigg Boss Telugu 5 that the next season will start in a couple of months. Further details about its launch, format, and contestants are expected to be revealed soon.

=== Broadcasts ===
There was no television coverage for this edition; instead, it would be completely streamed online at Disney+ Hotstar for 24*7 coverage.

=== House ===
The location for the house is still set to remain at Annapurna Studios like how it did for the original series. However minor changes and renovation is done to the house for this edition.

== Housemate pattern ==
Clique	Season 1
Film and TV actor/actress	Ajay Kumar
Film and TV actor/actress	Akhil Sarthak
Film and TV actor/actress	Bindu Madhavi
Film and TV actor/actress	Hamida Khatoon
Film and TV actor/actress	Mahesh Vitta
Film and TV actor/actress	Mumaith Khan
Film and TV actor/actress	Tejaswi Madivada
Film and TV actor/actress	Shree Rapaka
TV host	Ariyana Glory
TV host	Shiva
TV host	Sravanthi Chokarapu
Radio jockey	RJ Chaitu
Model	Anil Rathod
Producer	Mithraaw Sharma
Choreographer	Baba Bhaskar
Choreographer	Nataraj Master
Social media personalities	Ashu Reddy
Social media personalities	Sarayu Roy
Total num of contestants	18
Winner Runner-up Finalist

== Bigg Boss Non-Stop Buzzz ==
Bigg Boss Non-Stop Buzzz is an Indian Telugu-Indian language Reality Talk show with evicted housemates of reality television series Bigg Boss Non-Stop show. The show features the evicted housemates interviews with a previous season's contestant as a host and it will be aired on Disney+ Hotstar.

Season	Show	Host	Notes
1	Bigg Boss Non-Stop Buzzz	Ravi Kiran	Contestant of Bigg Boss 5
