= VJ Sunny =

Indian actor (born 1989)

- Born: 17 August 1989 (age 37); Khammam, Andhra Pradesh, India (now in Telangana, India)
- Other name: Arun Reddy
- Education: Osmania University, Hyderabad
- Occupation: Actor

VJ Sunny is an Indian actor and television personality who works in Telugu television shows and films. He gained popularity with the TV serial Kalyana Vaibhogam and Bigg Boss 5.

== Early and personal life ==
VJ Sunny was born to Venkateshwarulu and Kalavathi. He has two brothers . Sunny did his schooling from Nirmal Hrudai High School in Khammam and obtained his B.Com degree from Osmania University, Hyderabad. From a young age, Vijay Sunny harbored a passion for acting, gaining early recognition for his role in the play ‘Aladdin.’ His journey into the world of entertainment continued as he hosted a TV show called ‘Just for Men’ on a channel. Later, he took on the role of a journalist in a news channel for a period. His knack for connecting with the audience strengthened when he starred in the serial ‘Kalyana Vaibhogam,’ playing the character Jayasurya.

== Career ==
He started his career as a video jockey with the TV show Just For Men on Maa Music and later, he worked as a lifestyle journalist and interviewed many renowned celebrities.

In 2017, he debuted as a TV actor as the male lead for the serial Kalyana Vaibhogam in the role of a businessman opposite Meghana Lokesh. In 2021, VJ Sunny emerged as the winner of Star Maa's reality TV show Bigg Boss 5. Sunny won the title along with ₹50 lakh in prize money, a bike, and a plot worth ₹25 lakh.

== Filmography ==
Year	Title	Role	Ref.
2022	Sakalagunabhi Rama	Abhiram	
2023	Unstoppable	Kohinoor Kalyan	
2023	Sound Party	Raghava aka Dollar Kumar	

=== Television ===
Year	Title	Role	Network	Notes	Ref.
	Just For Men	Video Jockey	Star Maa		
2017	Kalyana Vaibhogam	Jaya Surya	Zee Telugu		
2021	Bigg Boss 5	Contestant	Star Maa	Winner	
2023	ATM	Jagan	ZEE5		
