= Shock (2006 film) =

- Theatrical release poster
- Directed by: Harish Shankar
- Written by: Screenplay: Harish Shankar; Story & Dialogues: Kona Venkat
- Produced by: Ram Gopal Varma
- Starring: Ravi Teja; Jyothika
- Cinematography: Sarvesh Murari
- Edited by: Bhanodaya
- Music by: Songs: Ajay–Atul; Score: Amar Mohile
- Production company: RGV Film Factory
- Release date: 9 February 2006
- Running time: 147 minutes
- Country: India
- Language: Telugu

Shock is a 2006 Indian Telugu-language action film directed by Harish Shankar in his directorial debut and produced by Ram Gopal Varma. The film stars Ravi Teja and Jyothika, while Tabu, Subbaraju, and Ravi Kale play supporting roles. The music was composed by Ajay–Atul with editing by Bhanodaya. It released on 9 February 2006. In 2013, the film was dubbed in Hindi as Mera Insaaf. The film was remade in Kannada as Prince (2011) starring Darshan.

== Plot ==
Sekhar and Madhu are a happily married couple who work for an advertising company. When Madhu gets pregnant, Sekhar is overjoyed and decides to shift to a new house. Nagesh and Divakar are notorious encounter specialists having a knack for not doing anything as per their senior's orders. On one such occasion, they shoot Sekhar, mistaking him to be a Maoist, at his new house. After realising their mistake, they frame him as a Maoist by planting evidence, and the police arrest him. Madhu hires Dharma Reddy, a lawyer to prove Sekhar's innocence. However, Dharma (who has been bribed by Nagesh and Diwakar) cheats both Sekhar and Madhu and manages to get an 8-year imprisonment for the former.

Madhu meets Geeta, an investigative journalist and they unite to get clues about Sekhar's innocence. Nagesh and Diwakar, having learned about their discreet investigation, barge into Madhu's house and threaten her to sign a suicide letter and kill her, later making it look like a suicide. Sekhar learns about Madhu's suicide and is devastated. Geeta later meets him and discloses about her investigation with Madhu, and reveals about Dharma Reddy, Nagesh and Diwakar's deception. An altercation with a fellow prisoner helps Sekhar escape from prison. Meeting Dharma Reddy, he kills him by getting him into a DUI accident. The CM orders the CBI to investigate the prison escape by dispatching Surendra Kumar. Kumar learns about Sekhar and his meet with Geeta the day before his escaped from prison, and has Geeta under surveillance and investigates more about Sekhar. Diwakar dispatches his men to search Sekhar parallelly after learning about Sekhar's escape and Dharma's death.

Sekhar lures Nagesh to an under-construction building by using the duo's police informer and kidnaps him to a secluded place, where he tortures Nagesh before making him sign a suicide letter of his love failure and kills him, making it look like a suicide. To apprehend Sekhar, Kumar fakes Diwakar's suspension and keeps him under police protection, arresting suspicious people nearby them. Despite this, Sekhar kidnaps Diwakar from his house and tries to kill him, only to be incapacitated by Kumar's men. Diwakar later uses Kumar's men to torture Sekhar, but Sekhar breaks free and beats Kumar's men and Diwakar black and blue; Sekhar breaks Diwakar's neck before being subdued by Kumar. While taking Sekhar to prison, Kumar releases him at the road, as he earned Kumar's respect, and Sekhar walks away.

== Cast ==
- Ravi Teja as Chandrasekhar a.k.a. Sekhar
- Jyothika as Madhurima a.k.a. Madhu, Sekhar's wife
- Tabu as Geeta, an investigative journalist
- Subbaraju as Nagesh, an encounter specialist
- Ravi Kale as Divakar, an encounter specialist
- Kota Srinivasa Rao as Lawyer Dharma Reddy
- Brahmanandam as Sekhar and Madhu's boss
- Nagendra Babu as CBI Officer Surendra Kumar
- Deepthi Nallamothu as Sekhar and Madhu's friend
- Ravi Prakash as Sekhar's friend
- Krishnudu as Sekhar's friend
- Krishna Bhagavaan as Gopi, a house broker
- Vizag Prasad as Madhu's father
- Hema as Sekhar and Madhu's neighbor
- Jeeva as Police Commissioner G. Gopal Rao
- Raghu Babu as Jailer
- Raja Ravindra as Labbipet Tilak
- Vajja Venkata Giridhar as Sekhar's office peon
- Ramjagan as Bapanna, Kumar's assistant

== Production ==
Ram Gopal Varma was to produce a film starring Ravi Teja directed by Prawaal Raman of Darna Mana Hai fame in Telugu. Ravi Teja wanted a Telugu person as the director, and Harish Shankar was brought on board.

== Soundtrack ==
Shock

Soundtrack album by Ajay–Atul
- Released: 2006
- Recorded: 2006
- Genre: Feature film soundtrack
- Length: 26:38
- Language: Telugu
- Label: Aditya Music
- Producer: Ajay–Atul

Ajay–Atul chronology
Restaurant (2006)	Shock (2006)	Zabardast (2007)

The songs were composed by Ajay–Atul and released on Aditya Music.

Track-List
No.	Title	Lyrics	Singer(s)	Length
1.	"Ni Vente Nene"	Chandrabose	S. P. B. Charan, Kousalya	4:40
2.	"Cycle Ekkki"	Kandikonda	Chakri, Shweta Pandit	4:54
3.	"Premante"	Kona Venkat	Shweta Pandit	4:26
4.	"Kummese Dammunte"	Pothula Ravikiran	Ajay, Kousalya	5:26
5.	"Madhuram Madhuram"	Veturi	S. P. Balasubrahmanyam, K. S. Chithra	4:42
6.	"Shock" (Instrumental)			2:30
Total length:				26:38
