= Jigris =

2025 Indian Telugu film by Harish Reddy Uppula

- Theatrical release poster
- Directed by: Harish Reddy Uppula
- Written by: Harish Reddy Uppula
- Produced by: Krishna Vodapalli, Chittem Vinai Kumar
- Starring: Krishna Burugula; Ram Nitin; Mani Vaka; Dheeraj Athreya
- Cinematography: Esvaradithyaa Yedida
- Edited by: Chanakya Reddy Toorupu
- Music by: Syed Kamran
- Production company: Mount Meru Pictures
- Distributed by: Vaasudeva Movie Creations
- Release date: 14 November 2025
- Country: India
- Language: Telugu

Jigris is a 2025 Indian Telugu-language buddy comedy film written and directed by Harish Reddy Uppula. The film stars Krishna Burugula, Ram Nitin, Mani Vaka and Dheeraj Athreya in lead roles.

For his performance in the film, Krishna Burugula received the Best Comedian award at the 2026 Telangana Gaddar Film Awards (TGFA)

The film was released on 14 November 2025.

== Cast ==
- Krishna Burugula as Karthik
- Ram Nitin as Praveen
- Mani Vaka as Prashanth
- Dheeraj Athreya as Vinay
- Mast Ali as Bilal, mechanic
- Muralidhar Goud as Karthik's father

== Music ==
The background score and songs were composed by Syed Kamran.

All lyrics are written by Harish Reddy Uppula.

Track listing
No.	Title	Singer(s)	Length
1.	"Thirige Bhoomi"	Eknath Kiran, Junaid Kumar, J. V. Sudhanshu	4:16
2.	"Meereley"	Eknath Kiran	3:24
3.	"Kannulundaga"	Hymath Mohammed	2:29

== Release and reception ==
Jigris was released on 14 November 2025.

Suhas Sistu of The Hans India rated the film 3 out of 5 and wrote that "Jigris doesn’t promise a complex storyline, nor does it attempt to. It focuses squarely on humor, friendship, and relatable moments". Chithra Jyothi rated the film 2.5 out of 5 and appreciated the lead cast performances.

== Awards ==
Year	Award	Category	Recipient	Result	Ref.
2026	Telangana Gaddar Film Awards	Best Comedian	Krishna Burugula	Won	
