= Harish Shankar =

Indian film director

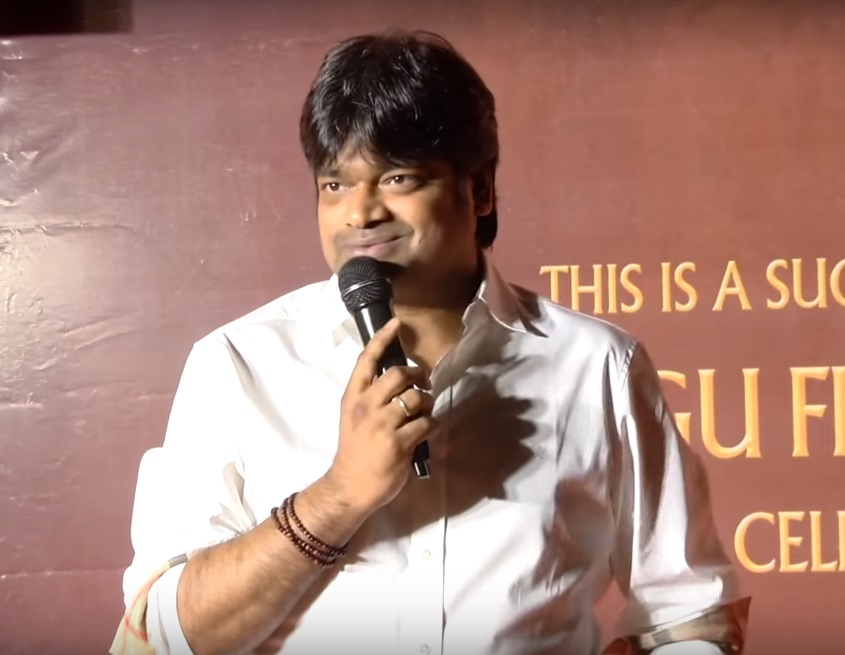
- Shankar at the success meet of Mahanati in May 2018
- Born: 31 March 1979 (age 47); Dharmapuri, Jagityal,Telangana, India
- Education: Osmania University
- Occupations: Film director; screenwriter

Sanganabhatla Harish Shankar (born 31 March 1979) is an Indian film director and screenwriter known for his works exclusively in Telugu cinema, and Telugu theater. He made his directorial debut with Shock (2006), produced by Ram Gopal Varma.

He directed Mirapakay (2011) and Gabbar Singh (2012), for which he received the SIIMA Award for Best Director and CineMAA Award for Best Director. Gabbar Singh grossed ₹150 crore (US$16 million) worldwide, becoming one of the highest grossing Telugu films at the time. Ramayya Vasthavayya (2013) grossed a worldwide share of ₹309 million (US$3.2 million) and DJ: Duvvada Jagannadham (2017) grossed ₹150 crore, both of which were directed by him.

== Early life ==
Harish Shankar was born in Dharmapuri, Telangana into a Telugu Brahmin family and was brought up in BHEL Township, Hyderabad. He has a younger brother, Vishnu Prasad, and a younger sister. He studied at Osmania University.

== Film craft ==
Shankar started stage acting with Seeta Nilayam and Lalitha kala Mandiram, based in Telangana. He then began writing and screenwriting. He is influenced by Yandamuri Veerendranath's works and is interested in dialects, regional and linguistic influences. He was associated with Kona Venkat, Puri Jagannadh, Ram Gopal Varma, and has worked as an associate director for films such as Ninne Istapaddanu and Veede.

== Filmography ==
Key
†	Denotes films that have not yet been released

- All films are in Telugu, unless mentioned.

=== Director ===
Year	Title
2006	Shock
2011	Mirapakay
2012	Gabbar Singh
2013	Ramayya Vasthavayya
2015	Subramanyam For Sale
2017	Duvvada Jagannadham
2019	Gaddalakonda Ganesh
2024	Mr. Bachchan
2026	Ustaad Bhagat Singh

=== Screenwriter ===
Year	Title	Notes
2003	Ninne Istapaddanu	Co-writer and actor
2004	Naa Autograph	Co-director
2005	A Film by Aravind	Actor
2008	Bujjigadu	Co-writer
2008	Chintakayala Ravi	Co-writer
2009	Konchem Ishtam Konchem Kashtam	Co-writer
2012	Nippu	Cameo appearance
2023	ATM	Writer; ZEE5 series

=== Actor ===
Year	Title	Role	Notes
2003	Ninne Istapaddanu	College student	Also co-writer
2005	Andarivaadu	Shankar	
2005	A Film by Aravind	Shankar	
2005	Modati Cinema	Harish	also worked as Associate Director
2008	Neninthe	screenplay writer	Cameo role
2012	Nippu		Cameo role
2018	Sammohanam	Himself	Cameo role
2025	Oh Bhama Ayyo Rama	Himself	Extended Cameo Role
2026	Funky	Himself	Cameo Role
