= Bhargavi (actress) =

Indian actress (1983–2008)

Bhargavi భార్గవ
- Born: 1983; Gorantla, Andhra Pradesh, India
- Died: 16 December 2008 (aged 24–25); Hyderabad, Telangana, India
- Cause of death: Murder
- Occupation: Actress
- Partner: Praveen "Bujji" Kumar

Bhargavi (Telugu: భార్గవి; 1983–2008) was an Indian actress best known for her appearances in Ashta Chamma and Ammamma.com.

== Career ==
Bhargavi was born in Gorantla, Guntur in 1983 to Rajendra Prasad Kola and his wife Bhanumathi. Prior to working in television, Bhargavi performed as a dancer alongside Sai Baba Orchestra in Nellore before moving to Hyderabad to pursue acting. Her first film role was as an unnamed college student in YVS Chowdary's Devadasu. She worked as an TV anchor on shows such as Aata and Maa Voori Vanta before appearing as Varalakshmi in Ashta Chamma (2008), a film inspired by Oscar Wilde's The Importance of Being Earnest. She played Nandu on the TV show Ammamma.com. At the time of her death, she was working on the film Holidays and had a number of films already booked.

== Death ==
On 16 December 2008, Bhargavi was found murdered on the bed of her Banjara Hills home with seven stab wounds. Praveen "Bujji" Kumar, who headed the Sai Baba Orchestra, was found with his head in her lap, having died from cyanide poisoning. A suicide note left in the bedroom near the bodies, purportedly written by Bujji, claimed that he and Bhargavi had married on 12 February 2006 at a hotel in Nellore, but had separated in the past few months due in part to Bhargavi's recent success following the release of Ashta Chamma. Bujji wrote that Bhargavi had been neglecting their relationship and that her mother was keeping them apart. Daijiworld reported that a CD containing their wedding photos was found in the room, though both of Bhargavi's parents denied the marriage had ever occurred.

Bhargavi is thought to have lived in the flat with her mother and the two had traveled to visit relatives in Guntur several days earlier. Bhargavi returned to Hyderabad early for work, either the day before or morning of her death. She died in the early morning hours of 16 December, likely after 6:30am, while getting ready for her film shoot. She spoke to her mother by phone around 4:00am and the Holidays producer at 6:00am. It is unclear who found the bodies: Bhargavi's driver Ramesh, the film's producer or two other members of the crew. navatarangam.com reported she had actually come down to meet the driver at around 6:30am before going back upstairs to retrieve jewelry she had forgotten.

Police speculated that it may have been a double suicide gone wrong, and that Bujji stabbed Bhargavi to death when she resisted, though her father dismissed the idea that his daughter would have even considered suicide. Bujji is thought to have killed himself using cyanide in a soft drink after attacking Bhargavi. Police declared it a murder-suicide.

== Filmography ==
=== Films ===
Year	Title	Role	Refs
2006	Devadasu	SRR College Student	
2006	Annavaram	Seetha	
2008	Mr. Medhavi	Sheela	
2008	Ashta Chamma	Varalakshmi	
2008	Raksha	Lakshmi	
2008	Pandurangadu		
2009	Holidays	Hasini	
2009	Anjani Puthrudu	Kanyaka Siromani Tulasi	

=== Television ===
Year	Title	Role	Refs
?	Aata	Herself	
?	Maa Voori Vanta	Herself	
2007	Ammamma.com	Nandu	
2007	Amrutham	Uma Devi	
