= Crrush =

- Release poster
- Directed by: Ravi Babu
- Written by: Ravi Babu
- Produced by: Ravi Babu
- Starring: Krishna Burugula; Abhay Simha; Charan Sai; Ankita Manoj; Parree Pande; Sri Sudha Reddy
- Cinematography: N. Sudhakar Reddy
- Edited by: Marthand K Venkatesh
- Music by: Vaidhhy
- Production company: Flying Frogs
- Distributed by: ZEE5
- Release date: 9 July 2021
- Running time: 129 minutes
- Country: India
- Language: Telugu

Crrush is a 2021 Indian Telugu-language adult comedy film written, directed and produced by Ravi Babu under the Flying Frogs. The cast includes, Krishna Burugula, Abhay Simha, Charan Sai, Ankita Manoj, Parree Pande and Sri Sudha Reddy. The film premiered on 9 July 2021 on ZEE5.

== Plot ==
Ravi and his friends want to study in America. Ravi's cousin who is studying in America visits Ravi's house. Arun explains that in America Arun was ridiculed due to lack of experience in sex and so Arun advises Ravi and his friends to have better experience in sex before coming to America. Ravi and his friends plan to lose their virginity before going to America. Ravi's friend, Vamsi, matches with Dolly on a dating app. Ravi's other friend, Teju gets attracted towards his divorced neighbor, Neelima. Teju visits Neelima to learn cooking. Saran and Lakshmi temporarily reside near Ravi's house and greet Ravi's parents, Murali and Manju. Ravi gets attracted towards Saran's daughter. On Vamsi's birthday, Dolly agrees to meet Vamsi and Dolly wants Vamsi to answer the door naked but Vamsi's parents arrive before Dolly resulting in an awkward situation. Teju gets close to Neelima. Dolly kisses Vamsi but Vamsi chases Dolly away after realizing Dolly is a transgender. Ravi sees Saran's daughter naked. Vamsi gets attracted towards his cousin, Nisha. Neelima gets upset after feeling Teju's erection. Ravi gets close to Saran's daughter. Ravi visits Saran's house and Ravi and Saran's daughter, Rupa kiss each other. Saran arrives and sees Ravi and Rupa together which creates chaos. Saran's family vacates the house. Neelima falls off a ladder and Teju puts an ice cube inside Neelima's Saree while trying to give a massage resulting in more drift. Teju matches with Madhu, Ramya and Chaya in a dating app. Vamsi tries to get close to Nisha. Ravi finds Rupa's new address and Ravi's parents don't want Rupa to meet Ravi. Rupa faces more problems at home. Teju buys condoms in a medical shop and visits Madhu and her daughters, Ramya and Chaya. Teju quickly leaves after seeing the medical shop owner in Madhu's house. Nisha's maid teases Vamsi. Ravi visits Rupa but Saran sees Ravi and Rupa together which creates chaos. Teju gets an awkward proposal from the medical shop owner. Nisha's maid, Bhavani massages Vamsi and Nisha sees Vamsi naked. Police warns Ravi not to meet Rupa again. Vamsi and Nisha grow close and see Bhavani and his husband getting intimate. Madhu's family visits Teju but leaves after Neelima arrives and kisses Teju. Ravi visits Rupa's house and gets intimate with Rupa. Teju and Neelima get intimate. Vamsi and Nisha get intimate. Ravi, Teju and Vamsi leave for America.

== Cast ==
- Krishna Burugula as Vamsi
- Abhay Simha as Ravi
- Charan Sai as Teju
- Ankita Manoj as Rupa
- Parree Pande as Nisha
- Sri Sudha Reddy as Neelima

== Production ==
The principal photography of the film commenced in January 2020. The filming was halted in March 2020 due to the COVID-19 pandemic. The filming was resumed in June 2020, Ramanaidu Studios, Hyderabad.

== Music ==
Crrush

Soundtrack album by Vaidhhy
- Released: 1 January 2021
- Genre: Feature film soundtrack
- Length: 18:12
- Language: Telugu
- Label: Saregama

Track listing
No.	Title	Singer(s)	Length
1.	"Ammayilu Ammayilu"	Hymath, Sai Madhav, Ritesh, Sahithi Chaganti	02:49
2.	"Evare Nuvvu"	Hymath	03:37
3.	"Kalipothundey"	Dhanunjayaditi Bhavaraju	03:40
4.	"Oolalaa"	Anurag Kulkarni	03:34
5.	"Premanta Premanta"	Dinker Kalvala	04:32
Total length:			18:12

== Release ==
In July 2021, it was announced that the film was heading for a streaming release on an OTT platform. It premiered on ZEE5 on 9 July 2021.

== Reception ==
Siby Jeyya of India Herald reviewed the film. Srivathsan Nadadhur of OTTplay rated the film 0.5 out of 5 stars.
