= Ragini (Telugu actress) =

Indian comedian

- Born: Chennai, Tamil Nadu
- Family: Krishnaveni (Sister)

Ragini is a Telugu comedic actress. She made her debut in TV serials aired on Doordarshan. She has acted in 550 serials and 190 Telugu films as a supporting character. She is the sister of Telugu actress Krishnaveni. She won the Nandi Award for Best Comedian Actress for her role in Ammamma.com.

== Filmography ==
- Chantabbai (1986)
- Daada (1987)
- Tiragabadda Telugubidda (1988)
- Jeevana Vedam (1993)
- Gaayam (1993)
- Therpu (1994)
- Kishkinda Khanda (1994)
- Thapassu (1995)
- Pavitra Bandham (1996)
- Jabilamma Pelli (1996)
- Akkum Bakkum (1996)
- Illalu (1997)
- Allari Pellikoduku (1997)
- Nayanamma (1997)
- Pellichesukundam (1997)
- Dongaata (1997)
- Ganesh (1998)
- Manasichanu (2000)
- Jabili (2001)
- Raa (2001)
- Vijayam (2003)
- Bhadradri Ramudu (2004)
- Allare Allari (2007)
- Ashta Chamma (2008)
- Parugu (2008)
- Baanam (2009)
- Maa Nanna Chiranjeevi (2010)
- Ee Rojullo (2012)
- Julayi (2012)
- Bhale Bhale Magadivoy (2015)
- Babu Bangaram (2016)
- Mahanubhavudu (2017)
- Shailaja Reddy Alludu (2018)

== Television ==
Year	TV Serial	Role	Channel
1996–1997	Lady Detective	Various	ETV
1997–1999	Anveshitha		ETV
2001–2007	Amrutham	Shantha	Gemini TV- 2007 Nandi Award TV – Best Comedy Actress
2003–2004	Nanna	Suguna	Gemini TV- 2004 Nandi Award TV – Best Supporting Actress
2003–2004	Seetharam Chitapatalu		Gemini TV- 2005 Nandi Award TV – Best Comedy Actress
2006–2008	Radha Madhu	Padma Sri	Star Maa
2007–2008	Ammamma.com		Maa TV
2007–2008	Gangatho Rambabu	Senior Ganga/Gangubhai	Zee Telugu
2012–2013	My Name Is Mangathayaru	Ganga	Zee Telugu
2012–2013	My Name Is Mangamma	Ganga	Zee Tamil
2013–2016	Sasirekha Parinayam		Star Maa
2015	Iddaru Ammayilu		Zee Telugu
2017–2020	AgniSakshi	Durga	Star Maa
2018–2020	Rendu Rellu Aaru	Madhu	Gemini TV
2020–2021	Amrutham Dhvitheeyam	Shantha	ZEE5
2021–present	Chelleli Kapuram	Neelaveni	Star Maa
2021–present	Aa Okkati Adakku		Gemini TV
2023–present	Brahmamudi	Meenakshi	Star Maa

== Awards ==
- Nandi TV Award for Best Comedian Actress for Ammamma.com
