= Krishna Burugula =

Indian actor and writer

- Born: Krishna Teja Reddy Burugula; Hyderabad, Telangana, India
- Occupations: Actor, writer
- Years active: 2008—present
- Known for: Jigris

Krishna Teja Reddy Burugula, professionally known as Krishna Burugula, is an Indian actor and writer who works in Telugu-language films and web series. He made his lead acting debut with the film Crrush and is known for his performance in Jigris, which is considered his breakthrough role and won Best Comedian award at Telangana Gaddar Film Awards 2025.

== Career ==
Krishna Burugula started his career with minor and supporting roles. He appeared as a child artist in Ashta Chamma and later worked as a background artist in Padi Padi Leche Manasu.

He made his debut as a lead actor with the Telugu film Crrush directed by Ravi Babu. He subsequently appeared in the films Maa Nanna Naxalite and played a lead role in the ZEE5 web series ATM produced by Dil Raju Productions. In 2024, he featured in the film Krishnamma, presented by director Koratala Siva.

His performance in the film Jigris marked a turning point in his career, gaining him wider visibility in Telugu cinema.

== Filmography ==
Year	Title	Role	Notes
2008	Ashta Chamma	Young Anand	Child artist
2018	Padi Padi Leche Manasu		Uncredited
2021	Crrush	Vamsi	
2022	Maa Nanna Naxalite		
2023	ATM	Karthik	Zee5 Web series
2024	Krishnamma	Shiva	
2025	Jigris	Karthik	

== Awards ==
"In 2026, Krishna Burugula received critical acclaim for his performance in the film Jigris(2025). His portrayal earned him the Best Comedian award at the Telangana Gaddar Film Awards (TGFA), where he was presented the honor by veteran actor Akkineni Nagarjuna and producer Dil Raju.

Year	Award	Category	Film	Result
2025	Telangana Gaddar Film Awards	Best Comedian	Jigris	Won
