= Ashta Chamma =

- Promotional poster
- Directed by: Mohana Krishna Indraganti
- Written by: Mohana Krishna Indraganti
- Based on: The Importance of Being Earnest by Oscar Wilde
- Produced by: Ram Mohan P D. Suresh Babu (presenter)
- Starring: Nani; Swathi Reddy; Srinivas Avasarala; Bhargavi; Krishna Burugula
- Cinematography: P. G. Vinda
- Edited by: Marthand K. Venkatesh
- Music by: Kalyani Malik
- Production company: Art Beat Capital Pvt. Ltd
- Distributed by: Suresh Productions
- Release date: 5 September 2008
- Running time: 126 minutes
- Country: India
- Language: Telugu
- Box office: ₹6 crore distributors' share

Ashta Chamma (transl. A four-player board game) is a 2008 Indian Telugu-language romantic comedy film written and directed by Mohana Krishna Indraganti. The film stars Nani, Swathi Reddy, Srinivas Avasarala, and Bhargavi, with Tanikella Bharani in a supporting role. An adaptation of Oscar Wilde's play The Importance of Being Earnest, the film deals with four quirky characters interwoven in a romantic narration. Upon release, the film received positive reviews and box office success. Swathi won the Filmfare Award and Nandi Award for Best Actress.

== Plot ==
The movie starts with an introduction of the ardent female fans of actor Mahesh Babu, who turn into an enraged frenzy when he gets married. Lavanya is the craziest of them all. She's caught up on marrying Mahesh, despite her aunt, Mandira Devi, repeatedly telling her that it's impossible. Lavanya pays no heed and stays depressed for days. She eventually reaches a compromise with her aunt by demanding that her husband's name must be Mahesh.

Mandira Devi relents and starts the hunt for a groom, though in vain. Their neighbour, Anand, promises to help Lavanya by finding a seemingly perfect "Mahesh". As all hope seems gone, Anand meets someone named Mahesh in a bar. After befriending him and "testing" him, Anand introduces Mahesh to Lavanya, and the couple seem destined to be together forever. One day, Lavanya reveals her obsession for the name of "Mahesh" and shows him a tattoo she got of the name.

Mahesh is in utter shock and disbelief that Lavanya loves him because of his name. That night, a drunk Mahesh shares this with Anand. The next morning, Anand finds a picture of a young woman in Mahesh's wallet, with a note on the back reading "Rambabu." Anand confronts Mahesh, and Mahesh reveals that his name is actually Rambabu.

Rambabu narrates his story to Anand, which starts at a village called Lakkavaram. Rambabu is the idolised village head where the people of the village treat him as a god. His only family after his father's death, is Varalakshmi (the woman in Mahesh's wallet), who he adores. Varalakshmi has a caretaker called Ammaji. Rambabu is tired of the godly image that he maintains and the burdening responsibilities. Whenever he craves for a break, on the ruse of meeting a friend called "Mahesh" for business, he goes to Hyderabad and enjoys to his heart's content as Mahesh himself.

Upon hearing this, Anand sympathises with Rambabu and stays loyal to him. Lavanya arranges for Rambabu to meet her aunt, to discuss marriage. Mandira Devi insults and misinterprets Rambabu for a roadside Romeo pretending to be rich to cheat Lavanya. She drives him out. Anand advises Rambabu to not make further moves until he devises a plan.

Anand suddenly goes to Lakkavaram to meet Varalakshmi. Anand introduces himself as Mahesh, Rambabu's friend from Hyderabad. Varalakshmi who has been fantasising about him through her brother's stories of him, falls for Anand.

Varalakshmi calls Rambabu to tell that Mahesh has come. Rambabu, initially confused, catches on, and warns Anand to leave his sister alone, and strictly instructs Ammaji to keep an eye on the both of them till he comes home. Meanwhile, Anand learns about Varalakshmi's secret obsession for the name "Mahesh". Anand, for Varalakshmi, wants to change his name to Mahesh and meets Sarva Sarma, an old bachelor priest who loves Ammaji. He agrees to pay 2 lakh rupees to conduct the rituals.

A furious Rambabu rushes to Lakkavaram and warns Anand off his sister. Anand asks Lavanya to elope to Lakkavaram. Upon meeting Varalakshmi, chaos ensues due a misunderstanding of cheating as they both love "Mahesh". Rambabu and Anand enter the room, and the women eventually understand that there is no "Mahesh". Disheartened and angry, Lavanya leaves. As there are no buses back to Hyderabad until the next day, she stays back for the day.

To stop Lavanya from leaving, Anand calls Mandira who just returned from a trip and is oblivious to Lavanya's eloping. A stressed Mandira is consoled by her best friend Amrutha. Mandira decides to visit Lakkavaram. Meanwhile, Rambabu also makes an offer to Sarva Sarma to change his name to Mahesh traditionally. Sarva Sharma reveals that Anand asked for the same. An angry Rambabu fights Anand and warns him to leave the name and Varalakshmi for good. As Anand is leaving Lakkavaram, Varalakshmi understands her feelings for Anand and they reconcile.

Mandira reaches Lakkavaram. She sees Rambabu's home, observes the site and property, understands that Rambabu is actually wealthy, and accepts Rambabu. Lavanya's feelings, however, have not changed. She does not want to forgive him. As Mandira and Lavanya argue, Ammaji comes back from a pilgrimage (after Rambabu came back, she went on a pilgrimage for peace).

Mandira recognises Ammaji, threatens to hit her with a coconut, and enquires about the baby which she had apparently stolen. Ammaji reveals that her real name is Anasuya. She used to take her baby boy to a railway station to show trains. One day, at the railway station, she sees Superstar Krishna. Starstruck, she leaves the baby on a bench to get an autograph. When she returns, the baby is gone. Afraid of consequences, Anasuya leaves town and eventually settles down in Lakkavaram as Ammaji. She reminisces of the beautiful baby boy and a warm, soft pink towel she last saw him in.

Rambabu freaks out when he hears this and asks about the blanket again. Rambabu rushes to open an old trunk and pulls out a towel. Anasuya confirms that it is the same towel. Rambabu reveals what his father told him on his deathbed. Rambabu was adopted. A suspicious man sat with a baby Rambabu on a train, and his father shoed him away, eventually adopting the baby. Rambabu is elated that he found his birth mother Anasuya. Mandira clarifies that Anasuya (Ammaji) was only Rambabu's caretaker. His real birth mother is Amrutha, Mandira's best friend.

Mandira immediately phones Amrutha to tell her that they found her lost baby. Amrutha and her husband immediately come to Lakkavaram. The estranged family meet at last, and everybody is happy except Lavanya, who is still upset about Rambabu's name.

Amrutha hands Lavanya a photo of baby Rambabu, and asks her to look at the back of it. It reads "Mahesh Babu". Amrutha named him Mahesh Babu before he was kidnapped. Lavanya is ecstatic and accepts Rambabu (Mahesh). Anand and Varalakshmi decide to get married with no objections. Then, at Rambabu's (Mahesh) order, Anasuya accepts Sarva Sarma marriage proposal. The movie ends with an interesting turn as Mandira is obsessed with the actor and name Pawan Kalyan.

== Cast ==
- Nani as Rambabu / Mahesh
- Swathi Reddy as Lavanya
- Srinivas Avasarala as Anand, Lavanya's neighbour and friend
  - Krishna Burugula as a Young-Anand, Lavanya's neighbour and friend
- Bhargavi as Varalakshmi, Rambabu's adoptive sister
- Tanikella Bharani as Sarva Sarma
- Hema as Ammaji / Anasuya
- Jhansi as Mandira Devi, Lavanya's maternal aunt
- Vasu Inturi as Ranga, Anand's domestic help
- Sivannarayana as Anand's father
- Ragini as Anand's mother
- Madhumani as Amrutha, Mandira's best friend and Mahesh's biological mother
- Goparaju Ramana as Rambabu's adopted father

== Production ==
Indraganti debuted with the National Film Award-winning Grahanam (2005) and followed it up with Mayabazaar (2006). While working on the characters, the story became more female-centric and thereby departed from Wilde's narration. After working on the story's draft of 225 pages for about two months, he began fine-tuning it for another few months. The film was produced by Ram Mohan, his first production venture. Mohan, a management graduate from Indian Institute of Management Ahmedabad, previously worked for UTV Software Communications. While Kalyani Malik was hired to compose the music and the background score, Marthand K. Venkatesh was chosen as the film's editor.

The film is named after Ashta Chamma, a game from the South Indian state of Andhra Pradesh. The game, which is otherwise known as Ludo, was released as part of the film's promotion.

While Indraganti wanted Bhumika Chawla to be cast in the leading role, he chose Colours Swathi in the supporting role. However, when he was unsuccessful in hiring Chawla for the film, he promoted Swathi to the lead role. Swati held a good opinion about Indraganti, whom she thought to be quite an educated director. After confirming Swathi for the role, Indraganti was scouting for three more actors to form the primary cast. During this period, Swathi completed the Tamil film, Subramaniapuram.

== Soundtrack ==
No.	Title	Singer(s)	Length
1.	"Nammalo Ledo"	Sreerama Chandra Mynampati, Manasa Veena	4:46
2.	"Hello Antoo"	Sushma, Sri Krishna	4:07
3.	"Aadinchi Ashta Chamma"	Sri Krishna	3:41
4.	"Thidathara Kodathara"	Sreerama Chandra Mynampati	4:22
5.	"Ashta Chamma Theme"	Sushma	3:16

== Awards ==
Filmfare Awards South

- Best Actress – Telugu – Swathi

Nandi Awards

- Best Home-viewing Feature Film – Ram Mohan
- Best Actress – Swathi
