= Bigg Boss (Telugu TV series) season 5 =

Indian reality television game show

Bigg Boss
- Season 5
- Season 5 eye logo
- Presented by: Nagarjuna
- No. of days: 105
- No. of housemates: 19
- Winner: VJ Sunny
- Runner-up: Shanmukh
- No. of episodes: 106

Release
- Original network: Star Maa
- Original release: 5 September – 19 December 2021

Season chronology
- ← Previous; Season 4 Next → Season 6

Bigg Boss 5 is the season of the Telugu version of the Indian reality television series Bigg Boss based on the Dutch series Big Brother. The show premiered on 5 September 2021 on Star Maa and Disney+ Hotstar with Akkineni Nagarjuna returning as a host for third time.

The season's finale took place on 19 December 2021 with Sunny winning the title along with ₹50 lakh in prize money, a bike, and a plot worth ₹25 lakh while Shanmukh Jaswanth emerged as the first runner-up.

== Production ==
This season was scheduled to launch in June 2021, but was delayed due to the second wave of the COVID-19 pandemic in India. The show organizers officially released a teaser using the show's logo on 1 August 2021. The promo shoots of the show were directed by Prasanth Varma. On 26 August 2021, it was confirmed that the show would premiere on 5 September 2021 on Star Maa.

== Housemates status ==
Sr	Housemate	Day entered	Day exited	Status
1	Sunny	Day 1	Day 105	Winner
2	Shanmukh	Day 1	Day 105	1st Runner-up
3	Sreeram	Day 1	Day 105	2nd Runner-up
4	Manas	Day 1	Day 105	3rd Runner-up
5	Siri	Day 1	Day 105	4th Runner-up
6	Kajal	Day 1	Day 98	Evicted
7	Priyanka	Day 1	Day 91	Evicted
8	Ravi	Day 1	Day 84	Evicted
9	Anee	Day 1	Day 77	Evicted
10	Jaswanth	Day 1	Day 70	Walked
11	Lobo	Day 1	Day 63	Evicted
12	Vishwa	Day 1	Day 56	Evicted
13	Priya	Day 1	Day 49	Evicted
14	Swetha	Day 1	Day 42	Evicted
15	Hamida	Day 1	Day 35	Evicted
16	Nataraj	Day 1	Day 28	Evicted
17	Lahari	Day 1	Day 21	Evicted
18	Uma	Day 1	Day 14	Evicted
19	Sarayu	Day 1	Day 7	Evicted

== Housemates ==
The participants in the order of appearance:

- Siri Hanmanth – Television actress and YouTuber. She has appeared in TV serials like Evare Nuvvu Mohini, Agnisakshi and Savitramma Gari Abbayi.
- Sunny – Video jockey and television actor. He is best known for his role in Kalyana Vaibhogam.
- Lahari Shari – Film actress known for the movies Arjun Reddy and Zombie Reddy.
- Sreerama Chandra – Playback singer, musician, and film actor. He was the winner of Indian Idol Season 5.
- Anee (Anita Lama) – Dance choreographer and television judge. She is known for her work on Mahanati and has been a judge of various reality dance shows, including Dhee and Dancee Plus.
- Lobo (Mohammad Khayyum) – Former video jockey on Maa Music and film actor.
- Shailaja Priya – Film and television actress. She is part of the soap operas Kotha Bangaaram, No.1 Kodalu, Sasirekha Parinayam and Priya Sakhi.
- Jaswanth "Jessie" Padala – Model and television actor. He appeared in the soap opera Saptha Mathrika and the film Entha Manchivaadavuraa.
- Priyanka Singh– Television personality. She is part of the television comedy show Jabardasth and is the second transgender contestant in the show.
- Shanmukh Jaswanth – YouTuber. He is best known for his role of Shannu in the short video The Viva and the web-series The Software DevLOVEper and appeared in the 2019 film Nannu Dochukunduvate
- Hamida Khatoon – Film actress. She is known for the film Sahasam Cheyara Dimbaka.
- Nataraj – Dance choreographer and television judge. He was part of the reality dance show Aata.
- Sarayu Roy – YouTuber. She is a part of 7 Arts YouTube channel.
- Vishwa – Film and television actor. He appeared in the TV series Yuva, Ganga Tho Rambabu and Ganga and Manga.
- Umadevi Maria – Film and television actress. She is best known for her role Bhagyalakshmi in the television series Karthika Deepam.
- Maanas Nagulapalli – Film and television actor. He is part of the television series Kokilamma and Manasichi Choodu.
- Kajal – Voice actor and radio personality from Radio Mirchi.
- Swetha Varma – Film actress, known for films such as Pachchis, Mithai and Raani.
- Ravi Kiran – Television presenter, radio personality and film actor.

=== Bigg Boss 5 Buzzz ===
Bigg Boss 5 Buzzz is an Indian Telugu-language television talk show about the reality television series Bigg Boss Telugu. Hosted by Ariyana Glory, the show features failed contestants from Bigg Boss 5 as guests. The show premiered on 13 September 2021 on Star Maa Music. Unaired portions of the show were also added to Disney+ Hotstar and Star Maa Music releases.

== Reception ==
The launch of the fifth season has received about 15.7 TVR in general and 18 TVR with HD viewership. The grand finale episode had secured 18.4 TVR + millions of views on Disney Hotstar.
