= The Software Devloveper =

Indian YouTube series

- Genre: Romance; Drama
- Written by: K. Subbu
- Directed by: K. Subbu
- Starring: Shanmukh Jaswanth; Vaishnavi Chaitanya; Pruthvi Mukka; Jhakaas Pruthvi; Iduri Sri Priya
- Theme music composer: Suman Vankara
- Country of origin: India
- Original language: Telugu
- No. of seasons: 1
- No. of episodes: 10

Production
- Executive producer: Sathwik G. Roy ( sathwik Gangisetty)
- Producer: Vandana Bandaru
- Production locations: Hyderabad, India
- Cinematography: Vamshi Srinivas
- Editor: Krishna Karthik Vunnava
- Running time: 17–41 minutes
- Production company: Infinitum Media

Original release
- Network: YouTube
- Release: 31 July – 27 October 2020

The Software Devloveper, stylized as The Software DevLOVEper, is an Indian Telugu-language romantic comedy drama web series written and directed by K. Subbu. Created by Infinitum Media, the series has an ensemble cast of Shanmukh Jaswanth Kandregula, Vaishnavi Chaitanya, Pruthvi Mukka, Jhakaas Pruthvi and Iduri Sri Priya. The ten-episode series premiered on YouTube on 31 July 2020.

== Synopsis ==
A group of four people including Shannu work in a social software company when a new girl, Vaishnavi, joins their team. Shannu falls in love with Vaishnavi and tries to spend time with her, but she treats him like a friend. Later, she thought that Mr. Shannu loves her, but when she cross checked if Shannu loves her or not, he lies that he is treating her as a friend. When he realized that she cross checked and she loves him too. He messages her that he loves her. But she hadn't seen the message, her father saw this message and took away her phone. Later Vaishnavi marries another guy. At the end, she realises that he always loved her. At the end of Season 1, it is shown that Shannu goes abroad for onsite.

== Cast ==
- Shanmukh Jaswanth Kandregula as Shanmukh "Shannu" Jaswanth
- Vaishnavi Chaitanya as Vaishnavi
- Pruthvi Mukka as DC Don
- Nagarapu Pruthvi as Marvel Manohar
- Iduri Sri Priya as Harika
- Palaparthi Sri Vidya as HR Manager Shruti
- Jaya Chandra as Manager Aravind
- Subbu K as Advisor
- Pravallika Damerla as Priya

== Production ==
In an interview to Sakshi, director Subbu said that he didn't have a plan of making the first season. He rather wrote a story that needs a basic plot. He then confirmed that the story he initially wrote will be made as the second season.

== Episodes ==
=== Season 1 (2020) ===
No. overall	No. in season	Directed by	Written by	Original release date
1	1	K. Subbu	K. Subbu	July 31, 2020
2	2	K. Subbu	K. Subbu	August 11, 2020
3	3	K. Subbu	K. Subbu	August 21, 2020
4	4	K. Subbu	K. Subbu	August 28, 2020
5	5	K. Subbu	K. Subbu	September 8, 2020
6	6	K. Subbu	K. Subbu	September 18, 2020
7	7	K. Subbu	K. Subbu	September 25, 2020
8	8	K. Subbu	K. Subbu	October 6, 2020
9	9	K. Subbu	K. Subbu	October 16, 2020
10	10	K. Subbu	K. Subbu	October 27, 2020

== Reception ==
Upon release, the first season obtained more than 158 million (15.8 crore) views combined. Karthik Keramulu of Film Companion quoted it as the "Baahubali of Telugu YouTube" but criticized the performance of Shanmukh and stated "Plus, the main problem with Shanmukh, as an actor, is that he’s not convincing enough. To put it mildly, he needs acting classes.".
